= Space Systems Command =

U.S. Space Force space development, acquisition, launch, and logistics field command

- Space Systems Command emblem
- Active: 20 Mar 1961 – Present (65 years, 7 months) Detailed: 13 August 2021 – Present (as Space Systems Command) 1 July 1992 – 13 August 2021 (as Space and Missile Systems Center) 15 March 1989 – 1 July 1992 (as Space Systems Division) 1 October 1979 – 15 March 1989 (as Space Division) 1 July 1967 – 1 October 1979 (as Space and Missile Systems Organization) 20 March 1961 – 1 July 1967 (as Space Systems Division)
- Country: United States
- Branch: United States Space Force
- Type: Field command
- Role: "Our Mission is to develop and field dominant space capabilities by advancing an expert workforce."
- Size: 10,000 personnel
- Headquarters: Los Angeles Air Force Base, California, U.S.
- Colors: Gold
- Decorations: Air Force Organization Excellence Award
- Website: ssc.spaceforce.mil

Commanders
- Commander: Lt Gen Philip A. Garrant
- Deputy Commander: Col Andrew S. Menschner
- Senior Enlisted Leader: CMSgt Kevin W. Ryan Jr.

Insignia
- Flag

Space Systems Command (SSC) is the United States Space Force's space development, acquisition, launch, and logistics field command. It is headquartered at Los Angeles Air Force Base, California, and manages the United States' space launch ranges.

Air Research and Development Command was redesignated as Air Force Systems Command in 1961. As part of that reorganization, the Space Systems Division (SSD) was established on 20 Mar 1961 and organized (activated) on 1 Apr 1961. In 1967, the Space Systems Division was reorganized as the Space and Missile Systems Organization (SAMSO), absorbing the Ballistic Systems Division's mission. In 1979, the Space and Missile Systems Organization was renamed the Space Division and divested itself of ballistic missile development. In 1989, the Space Division returned to its historic name of the Space Systems Division and regained its ballistic missile development role in 1990.

With the merger of Air Force Systems Command and Air Force Logistics Command in 1992, the Space Systems Division was redesignated the Space and Missile Systems Center (SMC). In 2001 the SMC was reassigned to Air Force Space Command, remaining attached through its redesignation as Space Operations Command in October 2020. On 22 April 2021, it changed status from a U.S. Air Force unit to a U.S. Space Force unit and was reassigned from Space Operations Command to Headquarters United States Space Force. On 13 August 2021, the Space and Missile Systems Center was upgraded into a Space Force field command, named Space Systems Command.

== History ==
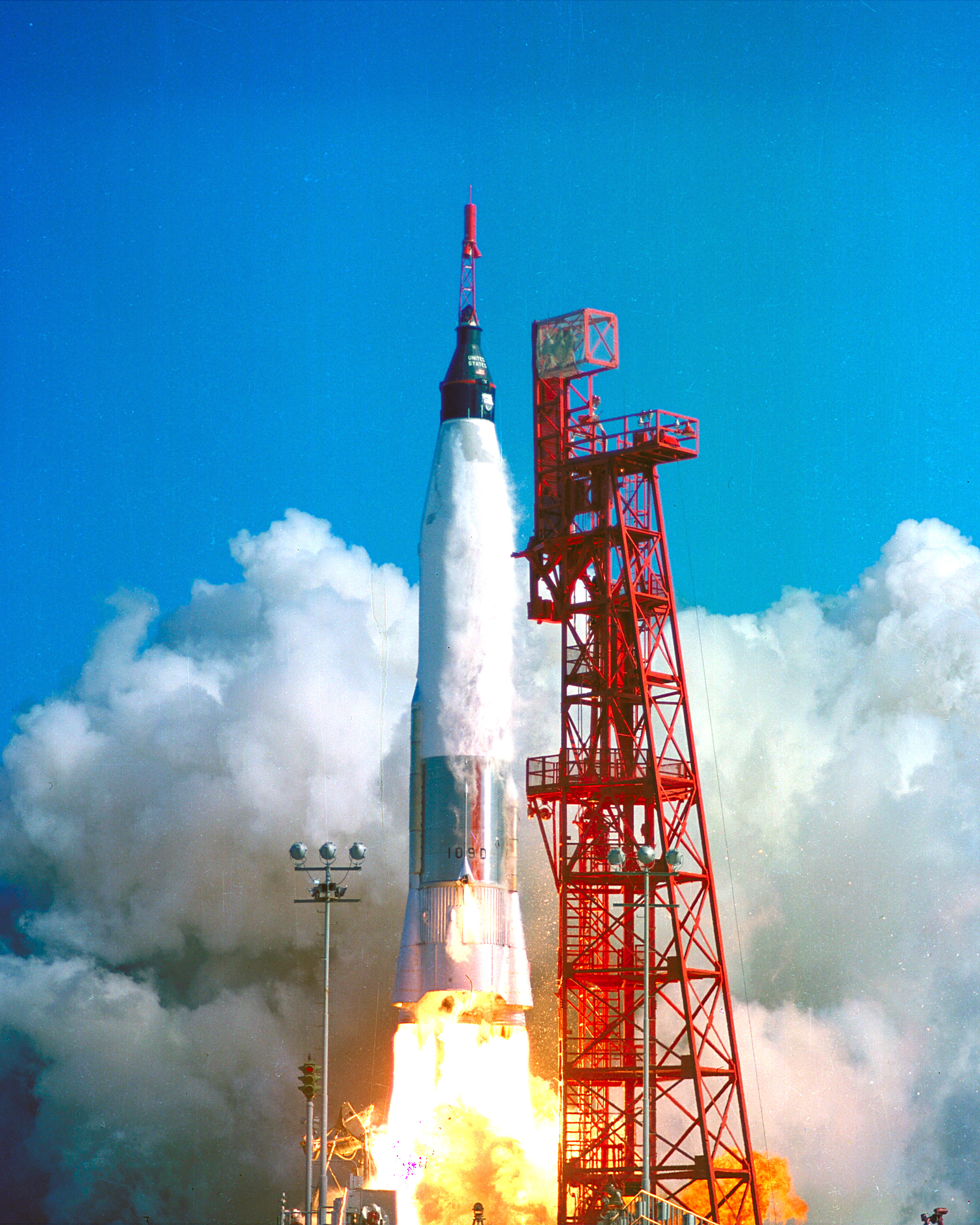
NASA astronaut John Glenn was launched on the first U.S. orbital flight, Mercury-Atlas 6, by an Air Force Ballistic Missile Division Atlas rocket on 20 February 1962.

Following the launch of Sputnik 1 by the Soviet Union in October 1957, the Eisenhower administration attempted to centralize all military and civil space programs in the Advanced Research Projects Agency. Responsibility for those programs was returned to the individual services in September 1959. The U.S. Army was designated lead service for communication satellites, the U.S. Navy for navigation satellites, and the U.S. Air Force for reconnaissance and surveillance satellites and space launch vehicles. This split arrangement lasted until March 1961, when Secretary of Defense Robert McNamara assigned the Air Force a near‑monopoly on military space development, with the exception of reconnaissance programs, which were passed to the National Reconnaissance Office in 1961.

=== Space and missile development 1961-1990 ===
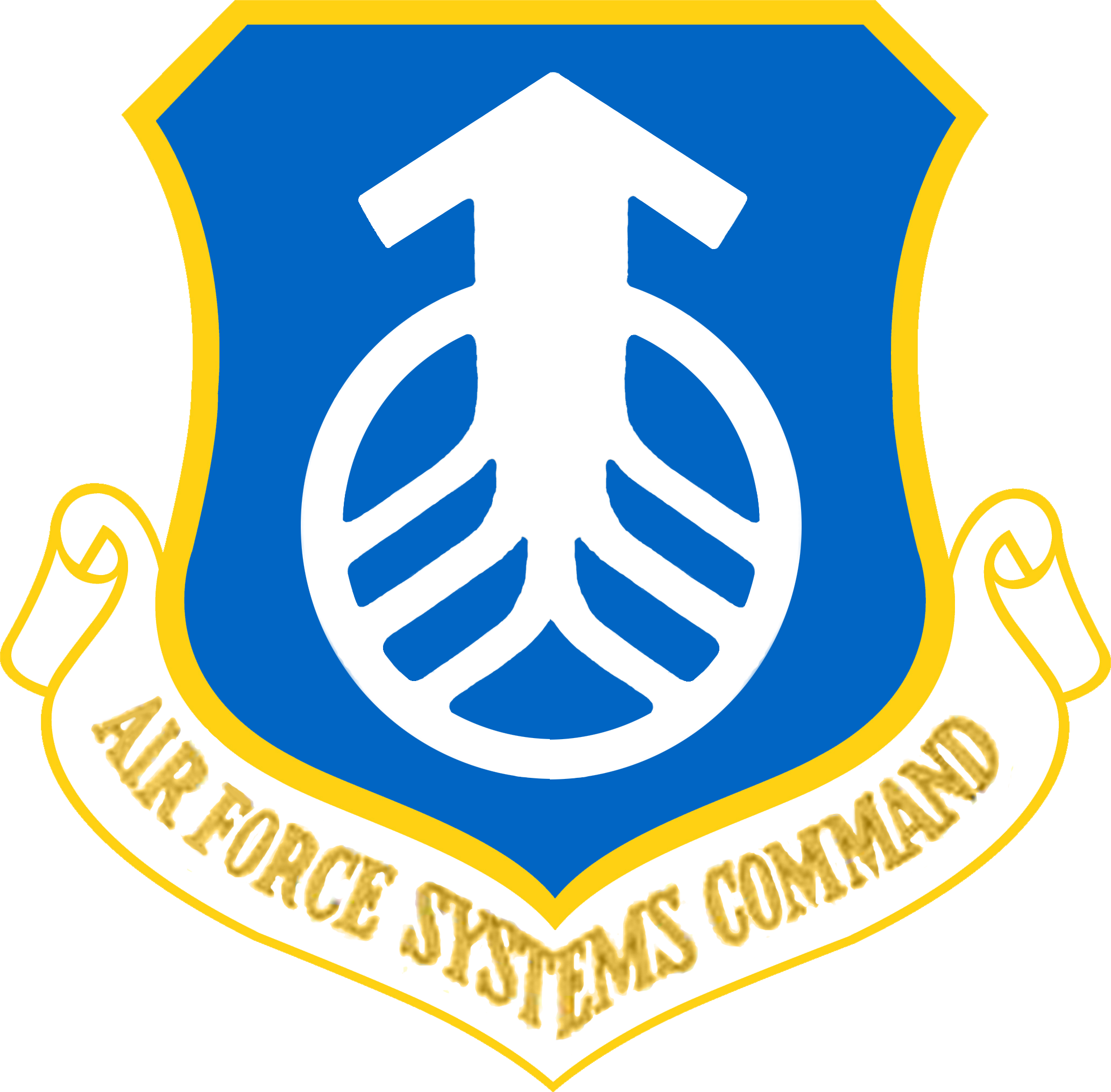
From 1961 to its inactivation in 1992, military space development was the responsibility of Air Force Systems Command.

On 1 April 1961, Air Research and Development Command was reorganized as Air Force Systems Command. Space and missile programs had grown to the point where the Air Force Ballistic Missile Division was split on 1 April 1961, with space systems under the Space Systems Division and missile programs under the Ballistic Systems Division.

The Space Systems Division, still located at Los Angeles Air Force Station, carried on the Ballistic Missile Division's development of the Titan III space launch vehicle, which was initiated in 1961 and first flow on 1 September 1964. The Titan IIIA consisted of a modified Titan II ballistic missile with a Transtage upper stage. The Titan IIIC was first launched from Cape Canaveral Space Force Station on 18 June 1965 and used two large solid rocket booster. The Space Systems Division also developed the Titan IIIB and provided NASA with Titan II GLVs for Project Gemini and developed the Agena target vehicle.

In 1963, the Space Systems Division began the Defense Support Program, which was intended to succeed where MIDAS failed and create an orbital constellation of infrared missile warning sensors. It also continued developing the Vela nuclear detonation detection satellites. The Vela satellite network came out of an Air Force Ballistic Missile Division–Atomic Energy Commission–NASA agreement in 1960 to develop a high-altitude nuclear detection system to ensure compliance with the Partial Nuclear Test Ban Treaty. The Atomic Energy Commission flew test detectors on Space Systems Division Discoverer satellites and the first Vela satellites were launched on an Atlas-Agena on 16 October 1963.

The Space Systems Division also began development on the Defense Meteorological Support Program (DMSP). The DMSP Block 1 satellites were launched on a Scout X-2 rocket in 1962, however the other four launch attempts failed. Further DMSP Block I launches were conducted on the Thor-Agena and Thor-Burner boosters. The Thor-Burner also launched the DMSP Block II and DMSP Block III satellites, which provided weather reconnaissance during the Vietnam War. The Block 4 satellites first launched in 1966. The Army Signal Corps' project SCORE, launched by the Air Force Ballistic Missile Division in 1958, was the world's first communications satellite but intended as a proof of concept. The Army Signal Corps followed by launching Courier 1B on an Air Force Ballistic Missile Division Thor-Ablestar in 1960, but it failed after 17 days in orbit. The Space Systems Division began development on the Initial Defense Communications Satellite Program (IDCSP) in 1962, launching constellations from 1966 to 1968. the IDCSP, also known as the Defense Satellite Communications Program Phase I (DSCS I) once operational, transmitted both voice and images to support the United States during the Vietnam War.

Although almost all crewed spacecraft programs went to NASA after its creation in 1958, the Air Force retained the Boeing X-20 Dyna-Soar program under the Wright Air Development Center, with the Titan IIIC initially intended as its booster. The program, however, was canceled in 1963 when it was determined that the Blue Gemini program would better satisfy its objectives. However, Defense Secretary Robert McNamara announced the Manned Orbiting Laboratory program, which was assigned to the Space Systems Division by General Bernard Schriever. Douglas Aircraft Company was responsible for the spacecraft, and the Space Systems Division was developing the Titan IIIM booster. However, the program only had a single test flight, OPS 0855, before being canceled in 1969.

The Space Systems Division also was responsible for anti-satellite weapons development. The first United States ASAT system was the Army's Nike Zeus missiles located at Kwajalein Missile Range and declared operational in 1963, but shut down in 1964 by the Defense Department, which favored the Air Force's ASAT efforts. The Space Systems Division's Program 437 used Thor boosters and nuclear warheads to destroy a satellite or space-based weapon from Johnston Atoll. The system was declared operational in 1964 and turned over to Aerospace Defense Command, however it was put on standby in 1970 and shut down in 1975. Program 437 also include the Program 437AP configuration, which give it the capability to inspect satellites. The Space Systems Division also managed the Space Test Program, known as the Space Experiments Support Program until 1971, for the Defense Department since it began in 1965.

In 1965, Space Systems Division replaced the 6594th Aerospace Test Wing with the Air Force Satellite Control Facility. Space launches were also conducted by the Space Systems Division, with the 6595th Aerospace Test Wing responsible for Vandenberg Air Force Base launches and the 6555th Aerospace Test Wing responsible for launches from Cape Canaveral Air Force Station.

==== Space and Missile Systems Organization ====
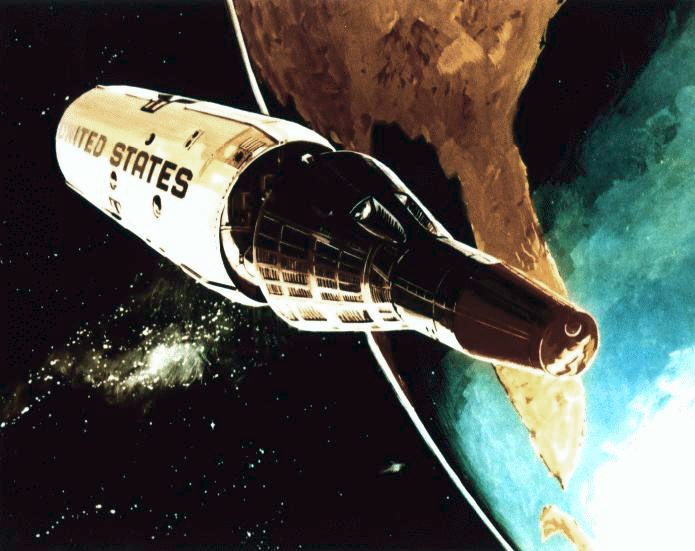
Illustration of the Manned Orbiting Laboratory in space.

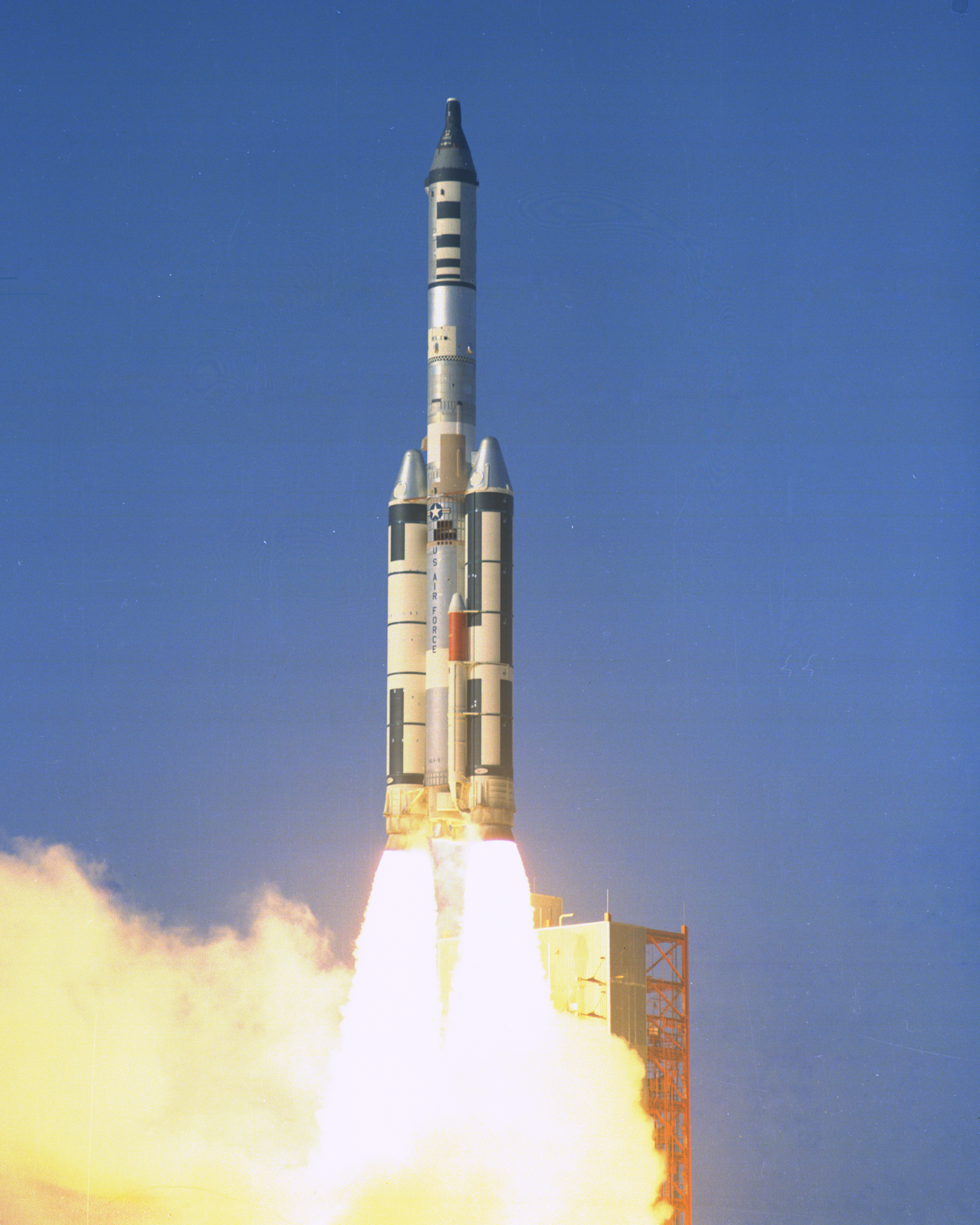
The first, and only, test flight of the Manned Orbiting Laboratory occurred on 3 December 1966.

Space and Missile Systems Organization centers and wings
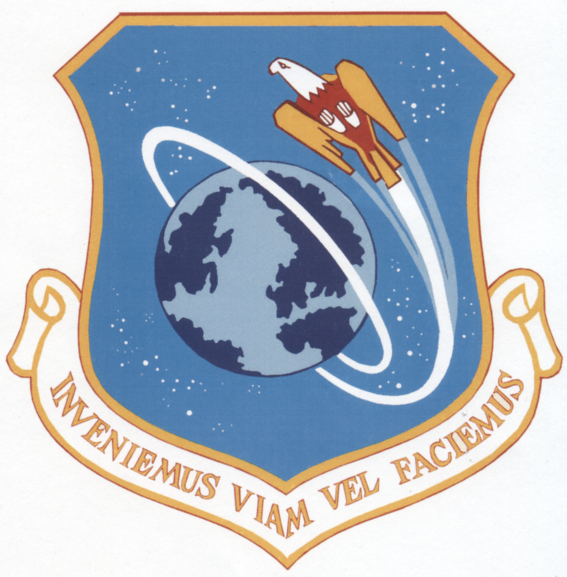
Air Force Satellite Control Facility

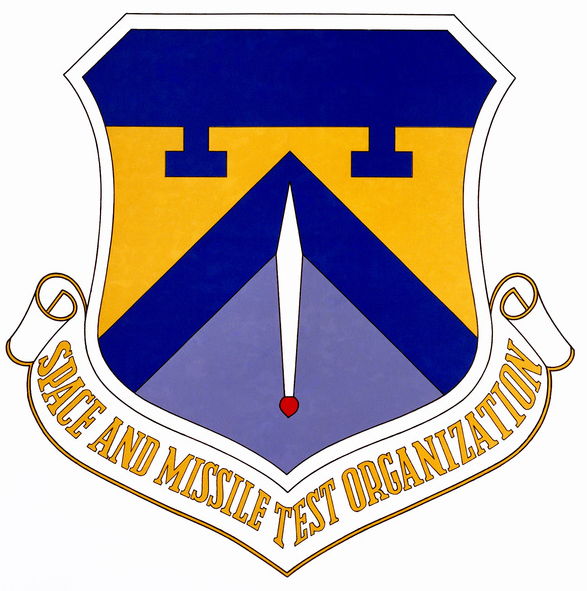
Space and Missile Test Center

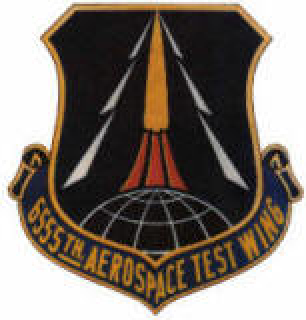
6555th Aerospace Test Wing

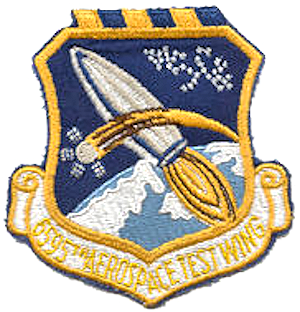
6595th Aerospace Test Wing

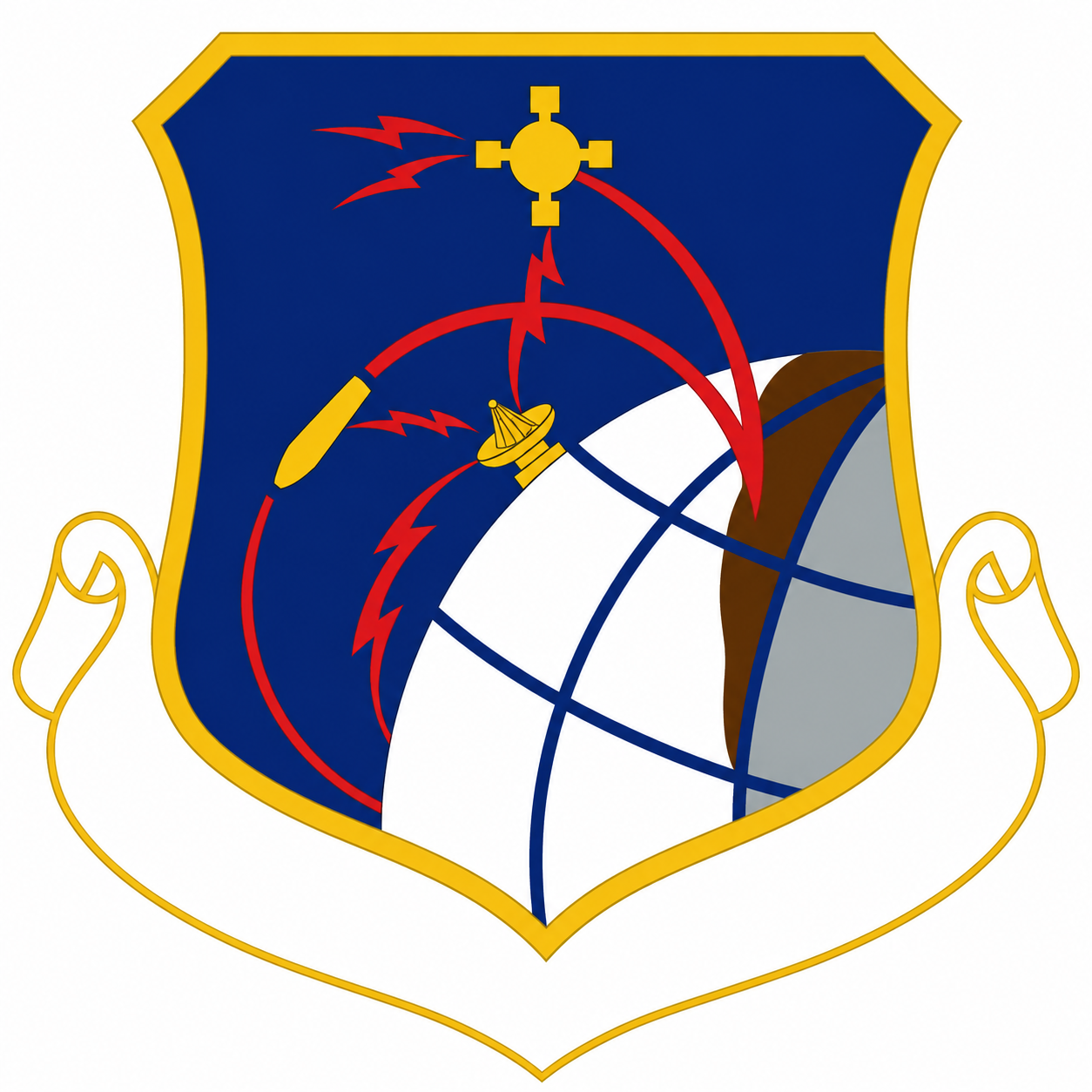
Western Test Range

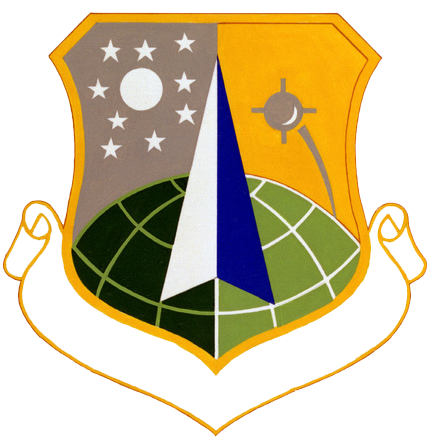
Eastern Test Range

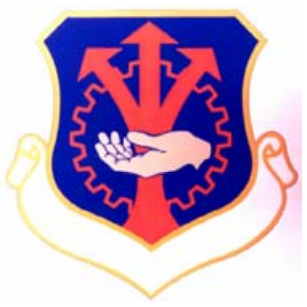
6592d Support Group

On 1 July 1967, the Space Systems Division and Ballistic Systems Division were remerged, forming the Space and Missile Systems Office (SAMSO). This remerger was prompted by economic reasons and SAMSO was located as Los Angeles Air Force Station. SAMSO did not start any new ballistic missile programs, but did oversee the replacement of the Minuteman I with the Minuteman II, which had improved range and guidance, and the Minuteman III, which more penetration aids to counter anti-ballistic missile defense systems and could be equipped with three multiple independently targetable reentry vehicles.

The Titan III space launch vehicle family was also expanded to include the Titan IIID and Titan IIIE, which were used to support NASA's launch of the Viking program in 1976. The Space and Missile Systems Organization was also the Department of Defense lead for the Space Transportation System, which would be developed into the Space Shuttle. As part of its contribution, it built a Space Shuttle launch and recovery site at Vandenberg Air Force Base for polar launches and also developed the Inertial Upper Stage.

The Space and Missile Systems Organization also oversaw the first launch of the Defense Support Program in 1970 on a Titan IIIC and the development and launch of the Advanced Vela satellites on Titan IIICs in 1967, 1969, and 1970. Three Defense Meteorological Support Program Block 5A, Block 5B, Block 5C, and Block 5D-1 satellites were also launched in the 1970s.

Although not an Air Force program, the Navy's Transit satellite system was the world's first satellite navigation constellation and started development in 1958. It was first launched on an Air Force Ballistic Missile Division booster in 1960 and achieved initial operational capability in 1964 and full operational capability in 1968. Transit used three operational satellites to enable users on ships and submarines to calculate their location in two dimensions and continued to operate until 1996. The Navy and Air Force both began follow on programs, with the Space and Missile Systems Organization developing Project 621B, envisioning a constellation of 20 satellites in synchronous inclined orbits. The Navy's Timation program instead envisioned a constellation of 21 to 27 satellites in medium altitude orbits. In 1973, Deputy Secretary of Defense William P. Clements directed the two programs merge into the Space and Missile Systems Organization's Global Positioning System, which used Program 621B's signal structure and frequencies and the medium Earth orbits of Timation.

The Space and Missile Systems Organization also led the development of the Defense Satellite Communications System Phase II (DSCS II). DSCS II had increased communications capacity, greater transmission strength, and longer lifetimes. As well, they also had steerable antennas. The first developmental contract was issued in 1969 and the first launch to geosynchronous orbit occurred in 1971, with the full constellation being formed in 1979. SAMSO also operationalized the Lincoln Experimental Satellites and Tactical Communications Satellite, building the Fleet Satellite Communications System (FLTSATCOM). Although the FLTSATCOM program was owned by the Navy, SAMSO managed the satellite acquisition, which started in 1971. It also managed the Air Force Satellite Communications system which became operational in 1978 and relied on transponders on FLTSATCOM and enabled the Air Force control over its strategic forces. SAMSO also managed the acquisition and launch of Skynet 1, which was launched on behalf of the Royal Air Force in 1969 and 1970. SAMSO also assisted the United Kingdom with the development of Skynet 2, which launched in 1974 and was turned over to the Royal Air Force in 1975. SAMSO also acquired and launched the NATO II and NATO III satellites. DSCS II, Skynet, and the NATO satellites were designed to be compatible with each other.

During the 1970s, the Space and Missile Systems Organization began a follow-on ASAT program to Program 437 that did not use nuclear warheads. The first, Project Spike, used a two-staged missile launched from a Convair F-106 Delta Dart. Project Spike did not enter development, however it served as a proof of concept for the Air-launched ASAT, which entered development in 1976.

In 1970, SAMSO's 6555th Aerospace Test Wing at Cape Canaveral Air Force Station became the 6555th Aerospace Test Group and realigned under its 6595th Aerospace Test Wing at Vandenberg Air Force Base. The 6595th Aerospace Test Wing was then realigned under SAMSO's new Space and Missile Test Center (SAMTEC), which oversaw launches at both Vandenberg Air Force Base and Cape Canaveral Space Force Station and operated the Western Test Range. In 1977, it gained the Eastern Test Range. On 1 August 1971, the 6592nd Support Group for Los Angeles Air Force Station was redesignated the 6592nd Air Base Group.

==== Space Division ====
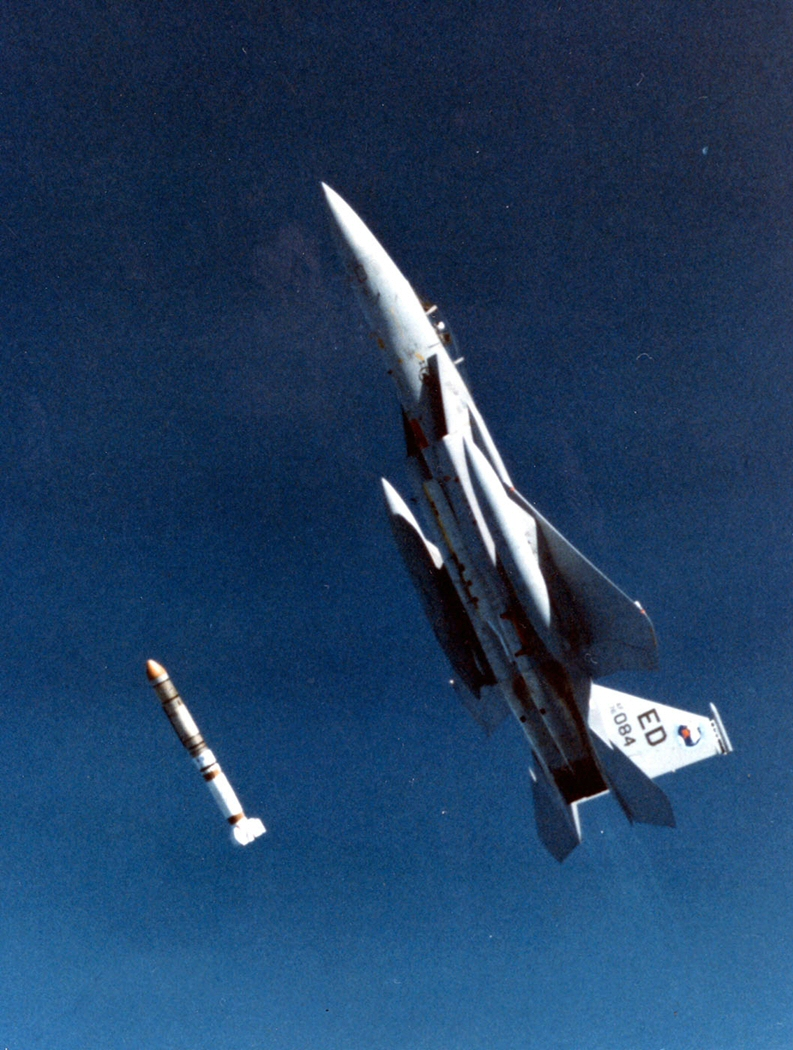
Launch of the ASM-135 ASAT missile.

Space Division centers and laboratories
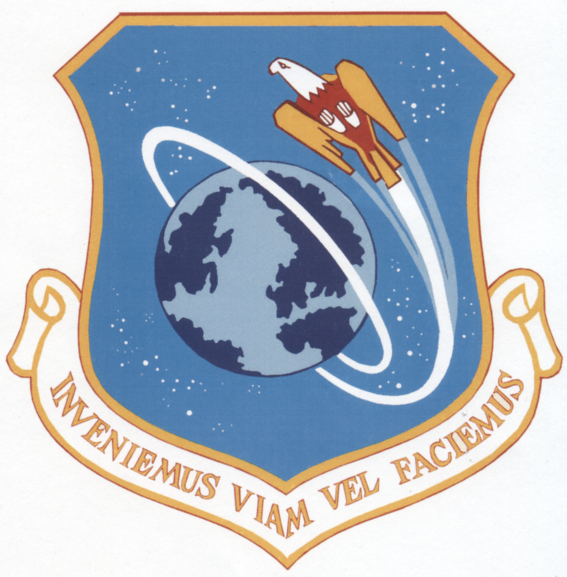
Air Force Satellite Control Facility

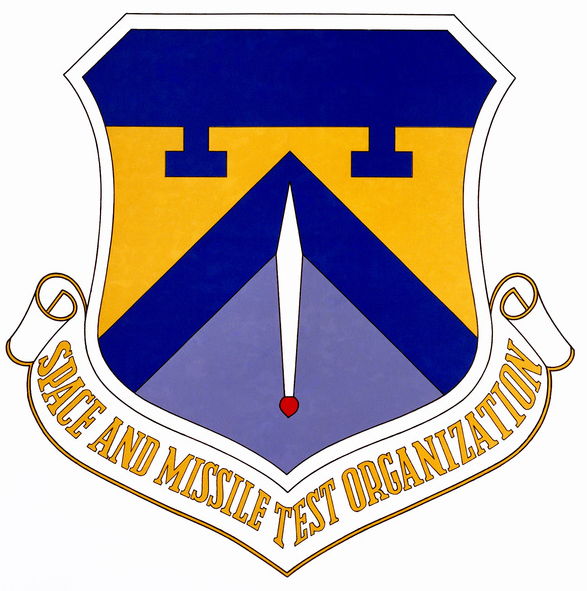
Space and Missile Test Organization

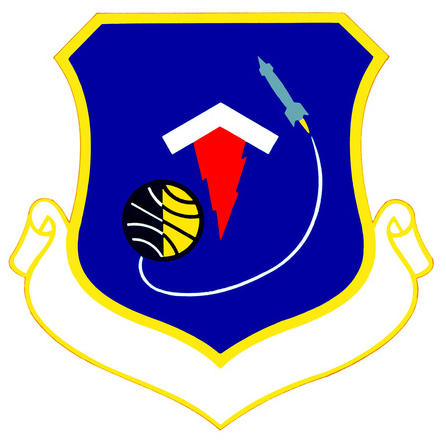
Air Force Space Technology Center

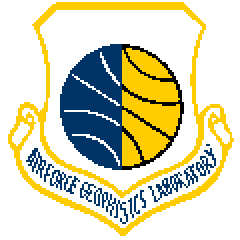
Air Force Geophysics Laboratory

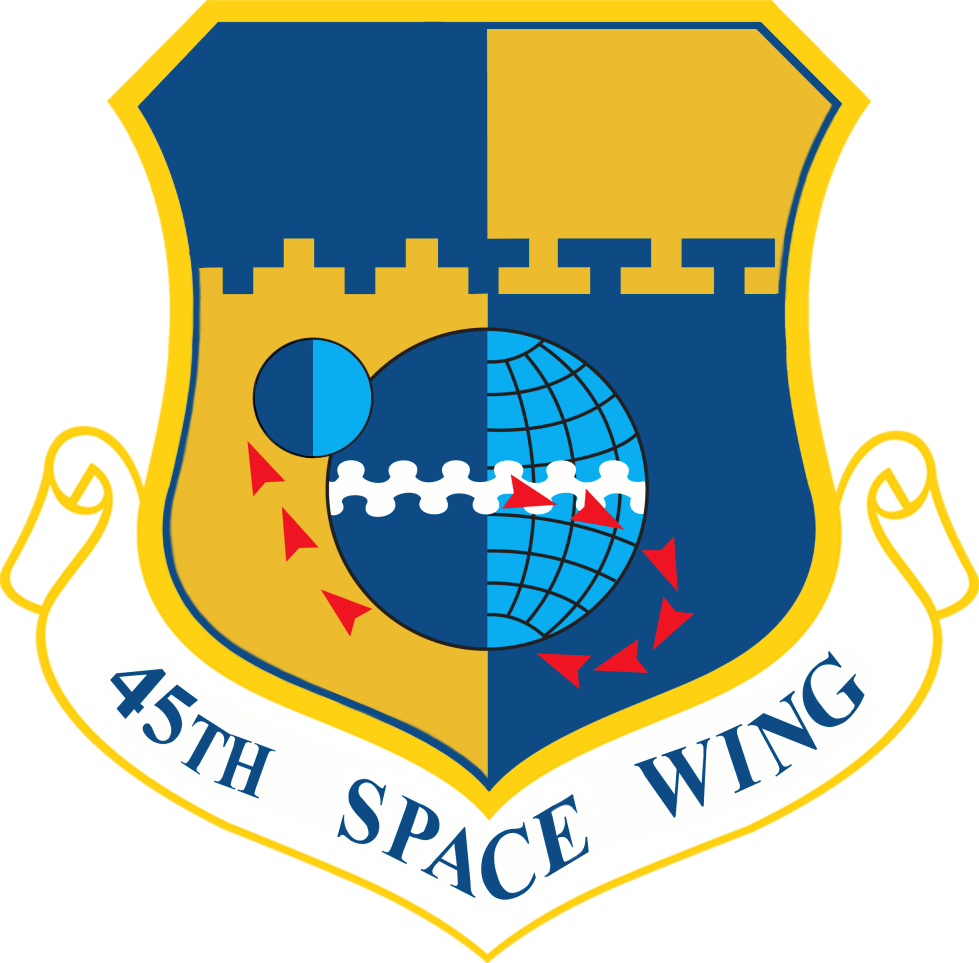
Eastern Space and Missile Center

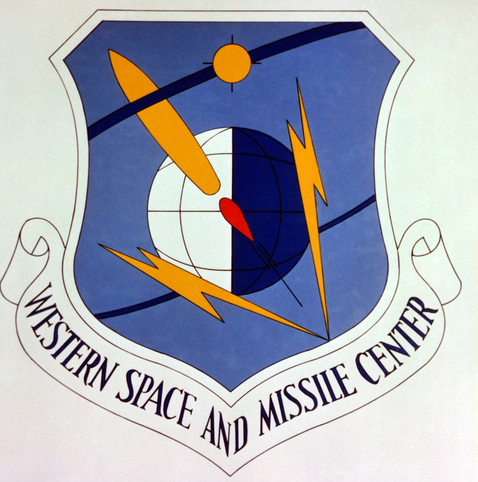
Western Space and Missile Center

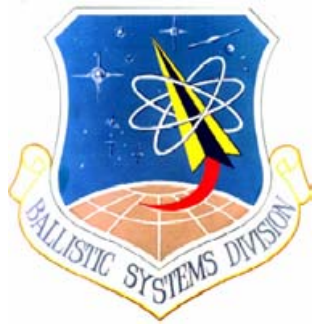
Ballistic Systems Organization

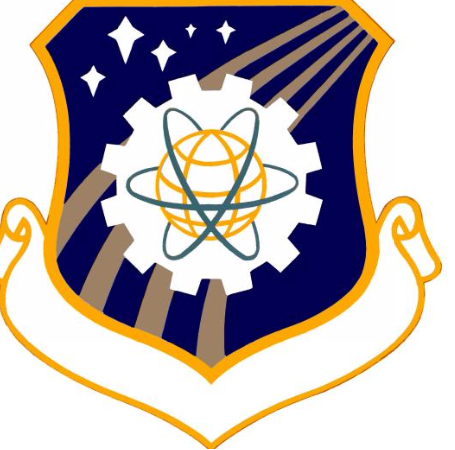
6592nd Air Base Group

On 1 October 1979, the Space and Missile Systems Organization was redesignated as the Space Division and split off its ballistic missile functions into the Ballistic Missile Office due to growth in both mission areas.

Starting in 1982, the Ballistic Missile Office assisted Strategic Air Command in deactivating the remaining Titan II missiles and placing them into storage for possible conversion into space launch vehicles. Under the Strategic Arms Limitation Talks, both the United States and Soviet Union were limited in the number of missiles they could deploy. This shifted the focus to quality. In 1973, the Space and Missile Systems Organization started the MX program, which looked at traditionally silo-based, ground-mobile, and air-launched ballistic missile options. In 1982, it was named the LGM-118 Peacekeeper ICBM by President Ronald Reagan and was capable of launching ten reentry vehicles at different targets more than 6,000 miles away. In 1983, the Peacekeeper had its first test launch from Vandenberg Air Force Base to a target in the Kwajalein Missile Range and the first went on alert with Strategic Air Command in 1986, being fully deployed in 1988. The permanent basing construct including making the Peacekeeper rail-mobile on trains, but with the end of the Cold War those plans were canceled by President George H. W. Bush in 1991. The Ballistic Missile Office also started development on the MGM-134 Midgetman ICBM in 1986, also known as the Small ICBM, which would be held in road-mobile launchers. Its first test flight occurred in 1991 from Vandenberg Air Force Base to a target in the Kwajalein Missile Range, but was canceled in 1992 due to the end of the Cold War.

The Space Division continued the Space and Missile Systems Organization's military development of the Space Shuttle alongside NASA, however in 1986 the Space Shuttle Challenger exploded during launch, forcing NASA to suspend all launches until 1988. Not only did it suspend the development of Shuttle launch and recovery facilities at Vandenberg Air Force Base, but also delayed all military payloads that were scheduled to be launched on the shuttle. The Space Division had been developing the Titan 34D as a backup in the event that there were any issues with the Shuttle program and after two launch failures in 1985 and 1986 suspended Titan 34 Launches, they resumed in 1987, restoring the only launch alternative to the Space Shuttle for large payloads. The Titan IV had already started development in 1985, but the Challenger disaster reinforced the need to have a diverse fleet of space launch vehicles. The Titan IV had its first launch in 1989 and could use either the Inertial Upper Stage or an upgraded Centaur stage. It also began the development of two new medium launch vehicles, with the Delta II intended to launch the Global Positioning System and the Atlas II intended to launch the Defense Satellite Communications System.

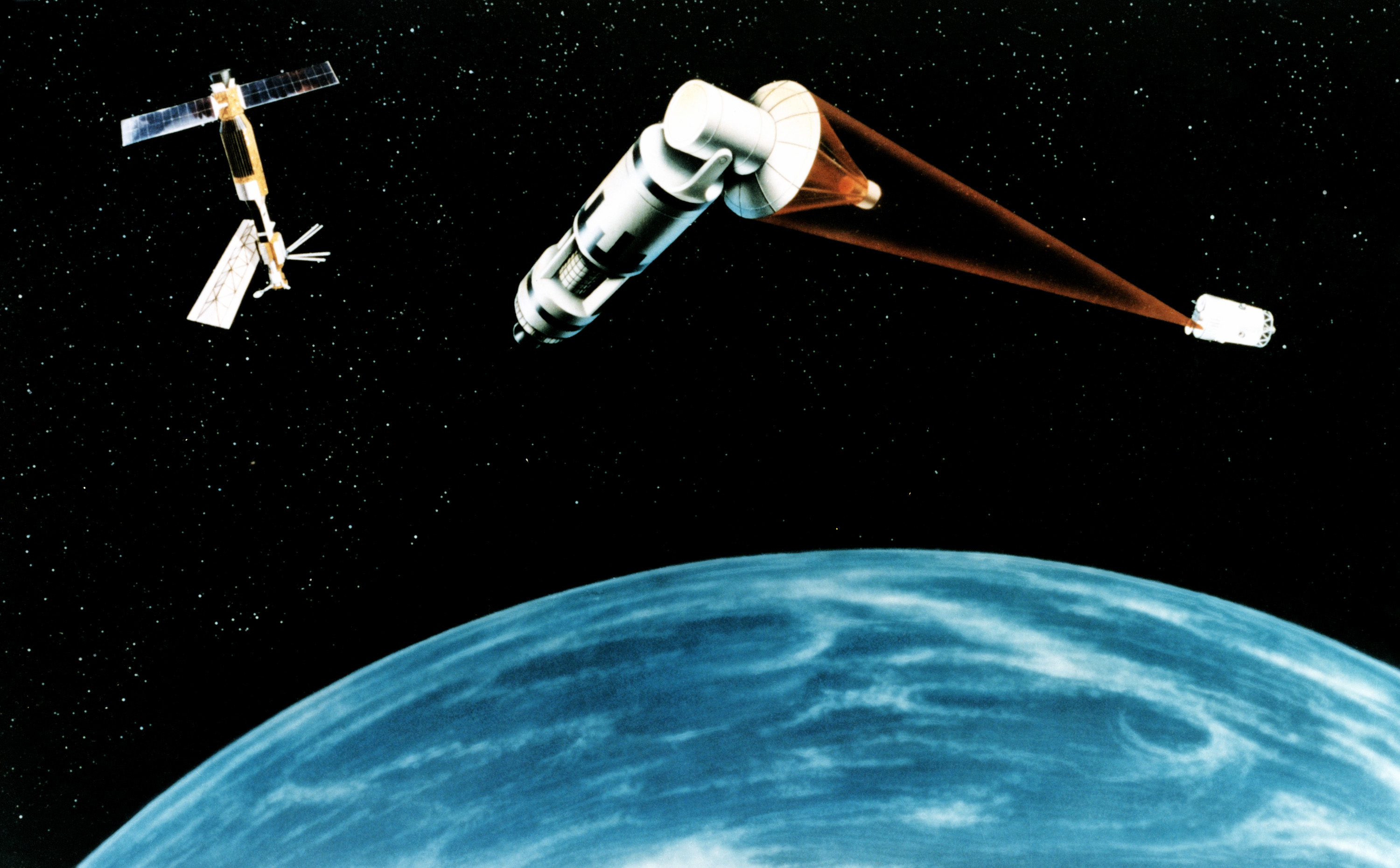
The Space Division was responsible for the development of the space component of the Strategic Defense Initiative.

The Space Division launched the first Defense Meteorological Support Program Block 5D-2s and started the procurement process for DMSP Block 5D-3s, as well as starting the deployment of the Global Positioning System constellation. It also continued the Defense Satellite Communications System Phase III deployment, launching the first in 1982 and the full constellation was completed in 1993. The Military Strategic and Tactical Relay, or Milstar, strategic satellite communication program was started in 1982.

The Space Division initiated the largest change to the Air Force Satellite Control Network since its inception, with Secretary of Defense Harold Brown authorizing the construction of a Consolidated Space Operations Center at Falcon Air Force Base in 1979. It was intended to comprise two parts, a Satellite Operations Complex to replace Onizuka Air Force Base and a Shuttle Operations and Planning Center to replace Johnson Space Center for military missions. The Shuttle Operation and Planning Center was canceled in 1987, while the Consolidated Space Operations Center gradually came online in 1989 and was fully transferred to Air Force Space Command in 1993.

The Space Division also continued the air-launched ASAT program that SAMSO started in 1976, culminating in the development of the ASM-135 ASAT. Its first test was on 21 January 1984 and on 13 September 1985, it was launched from a McDonnell Douglas F-15A Eagle to destroy the Solwind research satellite. The program was terminated in 1988 due to budgetary and congressional restrictions. Starting in 1983, the Department of Defense announced the Strategic Defense Initiative to provide missile defense, with the Space Division responsible for its space-based and Air Force components. In 1987, the Strategic Defense Initiative Organization selected the Space Division's Boost Surveillance and Tracking System, Space Surveillance and Tracking System, and Space-Based Interceptor for demonstration.

Immediately following the establishment of the Space Division on 1 October 1979, the Space and Missile Test Center was redesignated as the Space and Missile Test Organization, comprising the Eastern Space and Missile Center at Cape Canaveral Air Force Station and the Western Space and Missile Center at Vandenberg Air Force Base. On 1 September 1982, Air Force Space Command was activated as the Air Force's first major command for space and on 1 October 1987 the Air Force Satellite Control Facility was inactivated, with its functions being replaced by Air Force Space Command's wings. The Space and Missile Test Organization was inactivated on 1 October 1989, and on 1 October 1990 the Eastern Space and Missile Center and Western Space and Missile Center were transferred to Air Force Space Command's 9th Space Division, making it responsible for space launch.

However, the Space Division did gain responsibility for some research and development functions, gaining the Air Force Space Technology Center at Kirtland Air Force Base in October 1982. The Air Force Space Technology Center consisted of the Air Force Weapons Laboratory, Air Force Geophysics Laboratory, and Air Force Rocket Propulsion Laboratory. In 1990, the Air Force Space Technology Center was renamed the Phillips Laboratory and its three sub-laboratories were directly incorporated into it.

On 15 March 1989, the Space Division reassumed its historical name of the Space Systems Division and the Ballistic Missile Office also was renamed the Ballistic Systems Division. Due to cutbacks in the ballistic missile program due to the end of the Cold War, the Ballistic Systems Division was renamed the Ballistic Missile Organization and realigned under the Space Systems Division on 5 May 1990.

=== Realignment under Air Force Space Command ===
Air Force Materiel Command briefly succeeded Air Force Systems Command as the major command for space development from 1992 to 2001.

Space and Missile Systems Centers laboratories, wings, groups, and squadrons
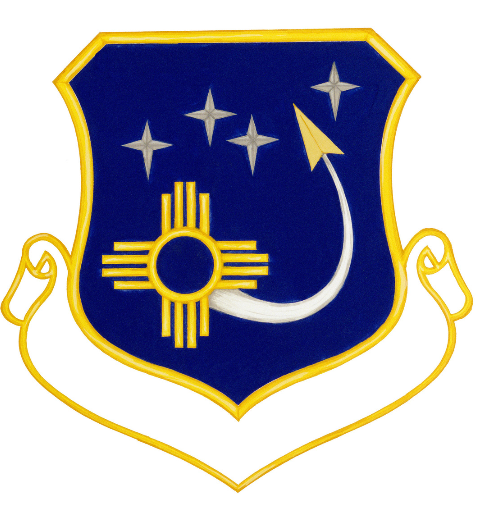
Phillips Laboratory

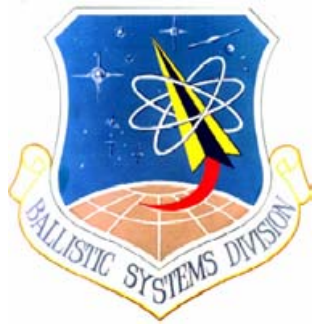
Ballistic Systems Organization

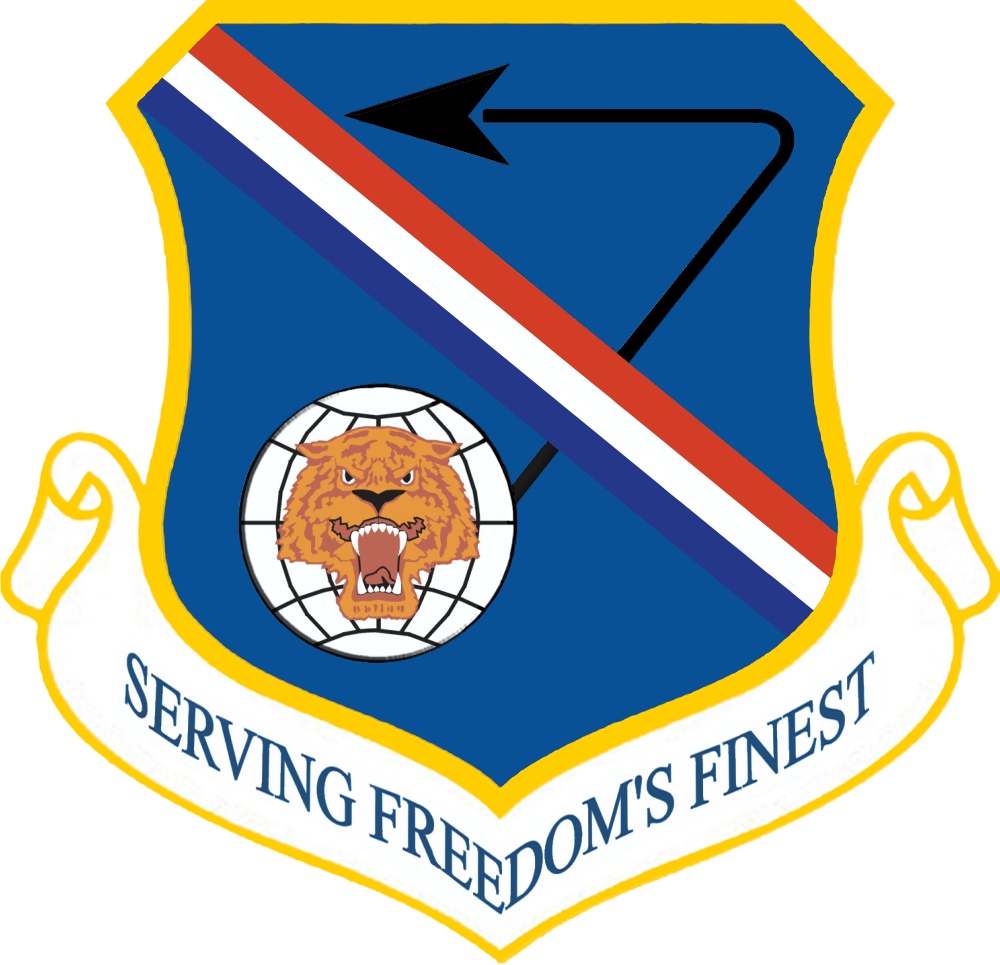
377th Air Base Wing

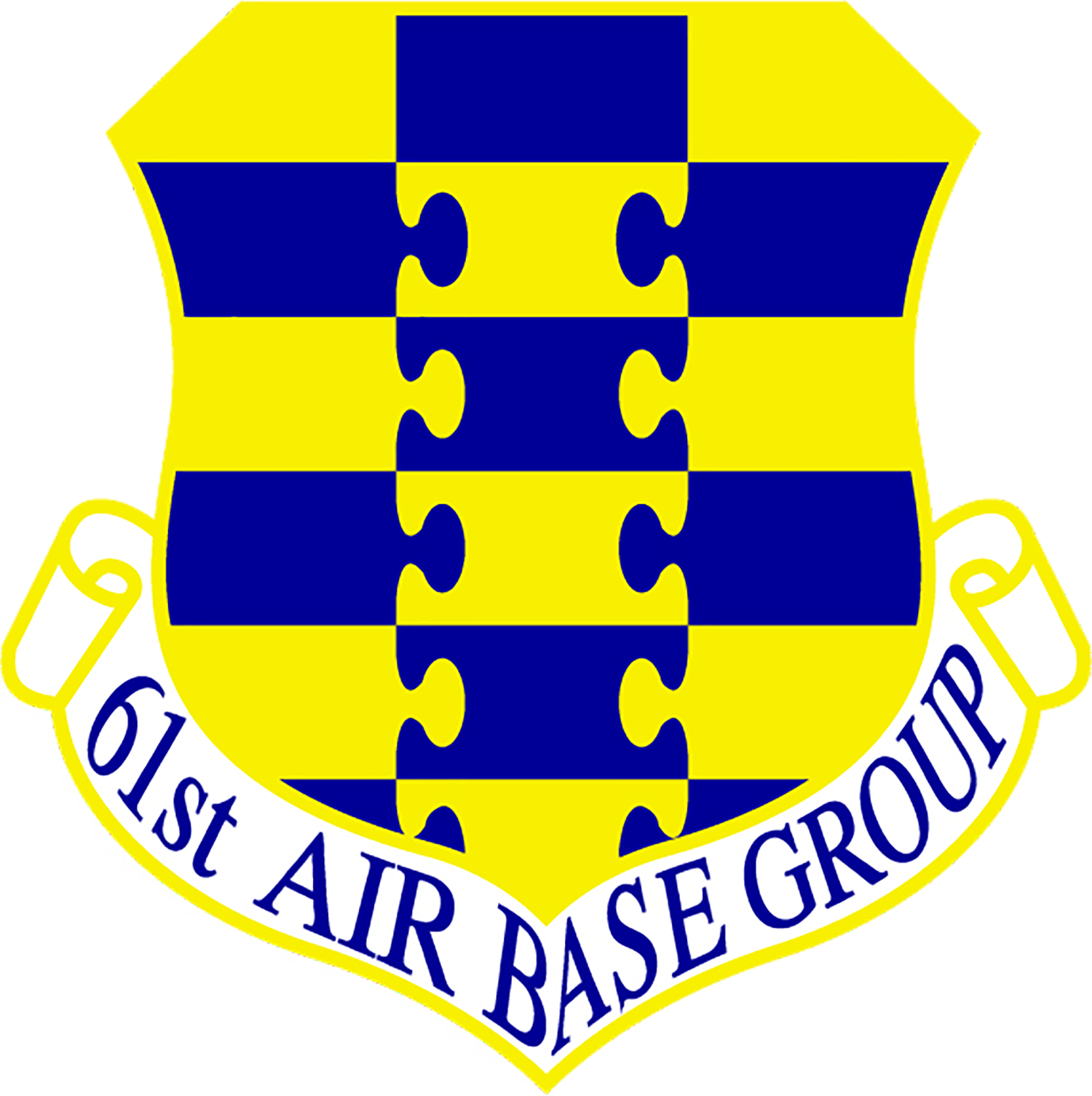
61st Air Base Group

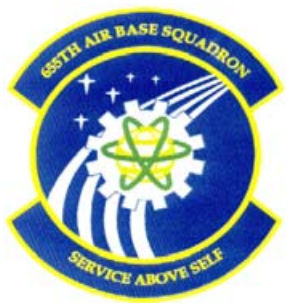
655th Air Base Squadron

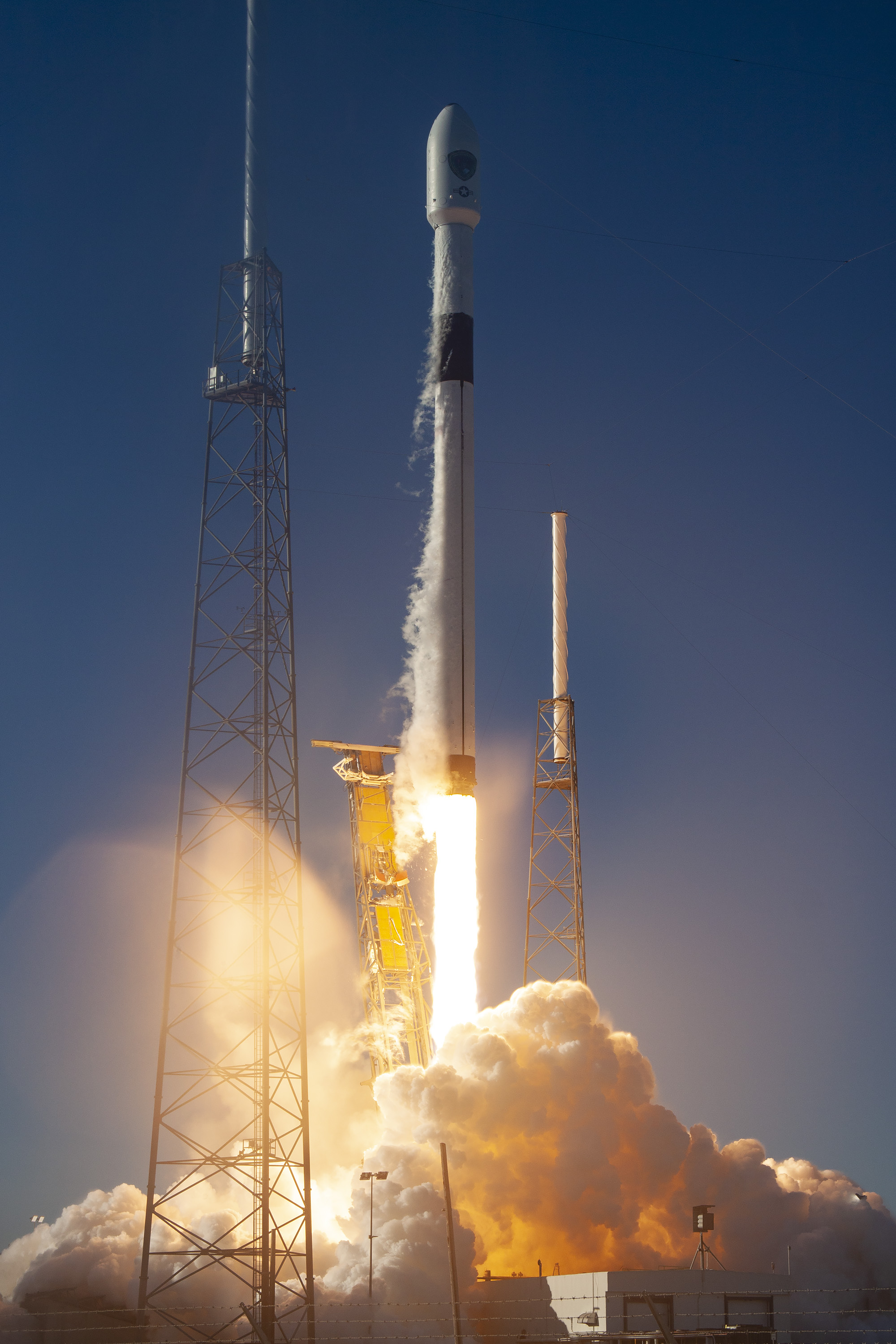
Starting in 2016, the Space and Missile Systems Center began flying missions using the Falcon 9 rocket.

As part of the Air Force's restructuring in the early 1990s, Air Force Systems Command merged with Air Force Logistics Command to form Air Force Materiel Command on 1 July 1992. As part of this merger, the Space Systems Division was redesignated as the Space and Missile Systems Center on the same date. On 1 October 1993, the 6592nd Air Base Group was redesignated the 655th Air Base Squadron as part of an Air Force-wide restructuring of support groups. In January 1993, Kirtland Air Force Base and the 377th Air Base Wing were directly assigned to the Space and Missile Systems Center and the 61st Air Base Group at Los Angeles Air Force Base was activated on 1 October 1994, replacing the 655th Air Base Squadron. On 8 April 1997, the Philips Laboratory was merged with other Air Force laboratories to form the Air Force Research Laboratory and Kirtland Air Force Base and its 377th Air Base Wing was transferred to the Air Armament Center on 1 October 1998. The remaining space functions at Kirtland AFB, including test and evaluation, launch of experimental payloads, and Space Shuttle Operations were consolidated into Detachment 12 which activated on 29 June 2001.

The START I treaty of 1991 and START II treaty of 1993 between the United States and the Soviet Union and its successor, the Russian Federation, dramatically reduced the amount of nuclear warheads in each superpower's arsenal. This resulted in the U.S. Air Force reducing the amount of Minuteman missiles, reconfiguring its missiles to have only one warhead, and scrapping the Pershing missiles. Due to the dramatic reduction in ballistic missiles, the Space and Missile Systems Center's Ballistic Missile Organization was officially inactivated in September 1993.

The Space and Missile Systems Center followed up on the Space Division's development of the Delta II and Atlas II space launch vehicles, procuring launches using the upgraded Atlas III, which used the Russian RD-180 engine. Following six launch failures from April 1998 to May 1999 the Department of Defense started the Launch Broad Area Review, releasing its report in November 1999 and recommending that the Space and Missile Systems Center have broadened responsibility for all Department of Defense launches, from acquisition to deliver of spacecraft on-orbit.

In August 1994, President Bill Clinton signed a National Transportation Space Policy, assigning responsibility for expendable launch vehicles to the Defense Department and directed it to develop improved variants of current vehicles. In response, the Space and Missile Systems Center built the Evolved Expendable Launch Vehicle program and awarded the first contracts in 1995. One went to McDonnell Douglas for the Delta IV and Delta IV Heavy, while the other went to Lockheed Martin for the Atlas V. In 2006, the two launch providers merged to form United Launch Alliance. In 2016, SpaceX was awarded its first military launch under the Evolved Expendable Launch Vehicle program, using its Falcon 9 and Falcon Heavy boosters. In 2019, in part due to SpaceX's success with reusable rockets, the program's name was changed to National Security Space Launch.

In 1994, the Space and Missile Systems Center had started the Space-Based Infrared System (SBIRS) program to replace the Defense Support Program. SBIRS was built upon technology tested for the Strategic Defense Initiative, launching its first satellite in 2011. Since the 1970s, proposals were made to merge the military and National Oceanic and Atmospheric Administration's (NOAA) weather satellites. In 1994, President Clinton directed that the programs eventually be merged. In 1995, the Air Force, NASA, and NOAA started the National Polar-orbiting Operational Environmental Satellite System which was intended to replace the Defense Metrological Support Program and be operated by NOAA, but the program collapsed due to cost overruns in 2010 and a full merging of the programs has not occurred. A second Defense Department-only effort, the Defense Weather Satellite System, was canceled by Congress in 2012.

The Global Positioning System constellation became fully completed in 1994 and achieved initial operational capability in 1995. Milstar had its first launch in 1995 and the Space and Missile Systems Center started development on the Wideband Global SATCOM system to replace the Defense Satellite Communications System and the Advanced Extremely High Frequency to replace Milstar. The Brilliant Pebbles space-based anti-missile interceptor was transferred to the Space and Missile Systems Center in 1993 from the Ballistic Missile Defense Organization, but was terminated in 1994.

In 2001, the Space Commission came out with its report on national security space. A major recommendation was realigning the Space and Missile Systems Center from Air Force Materiel Command to Air Force Space Command to consolidate management of space programs to one major command. This occurred on 1 October 2001.

In 2001, military space development was consolidated under Air Force Space Command.

Space and Missile Systems Centers wings and groups (2006–2010)
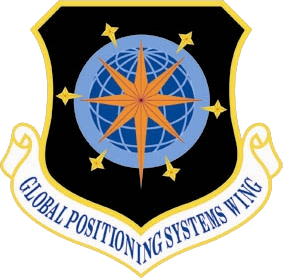
Global Positioning Systems Wing

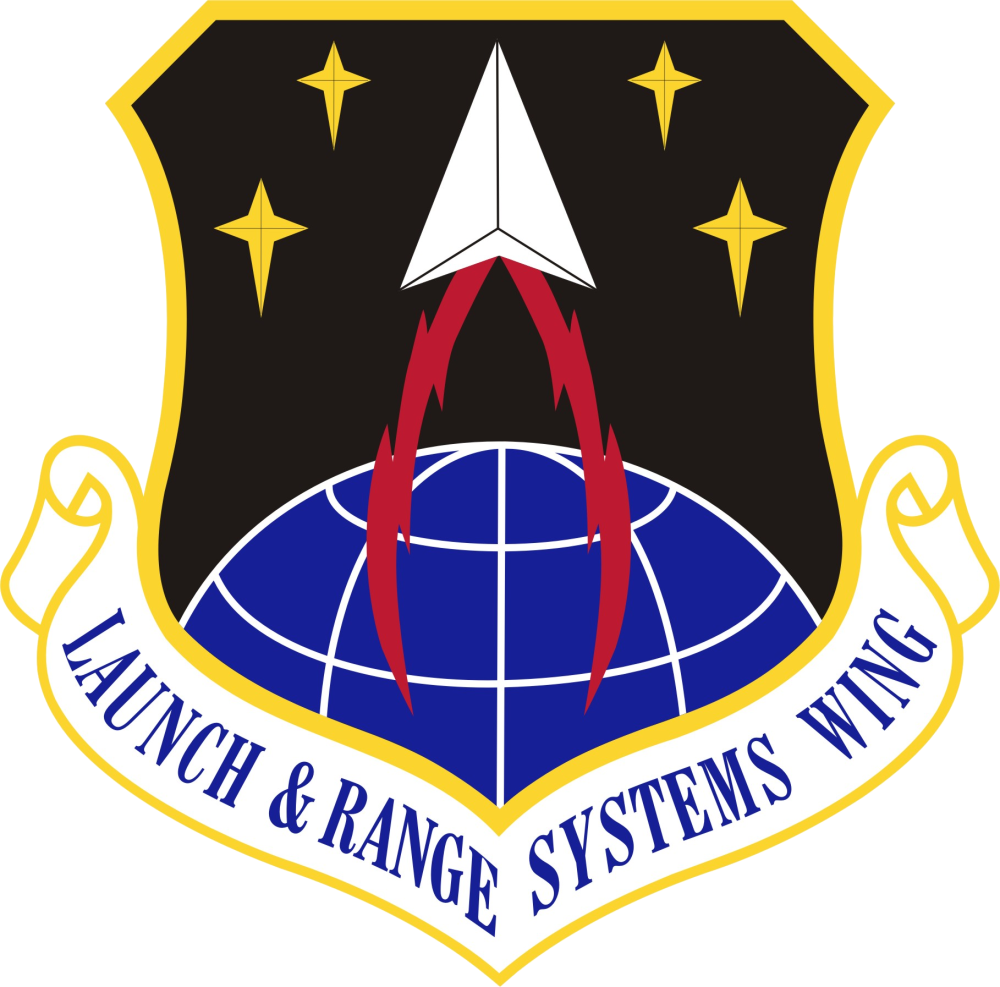
Launch and Range Systems Wing

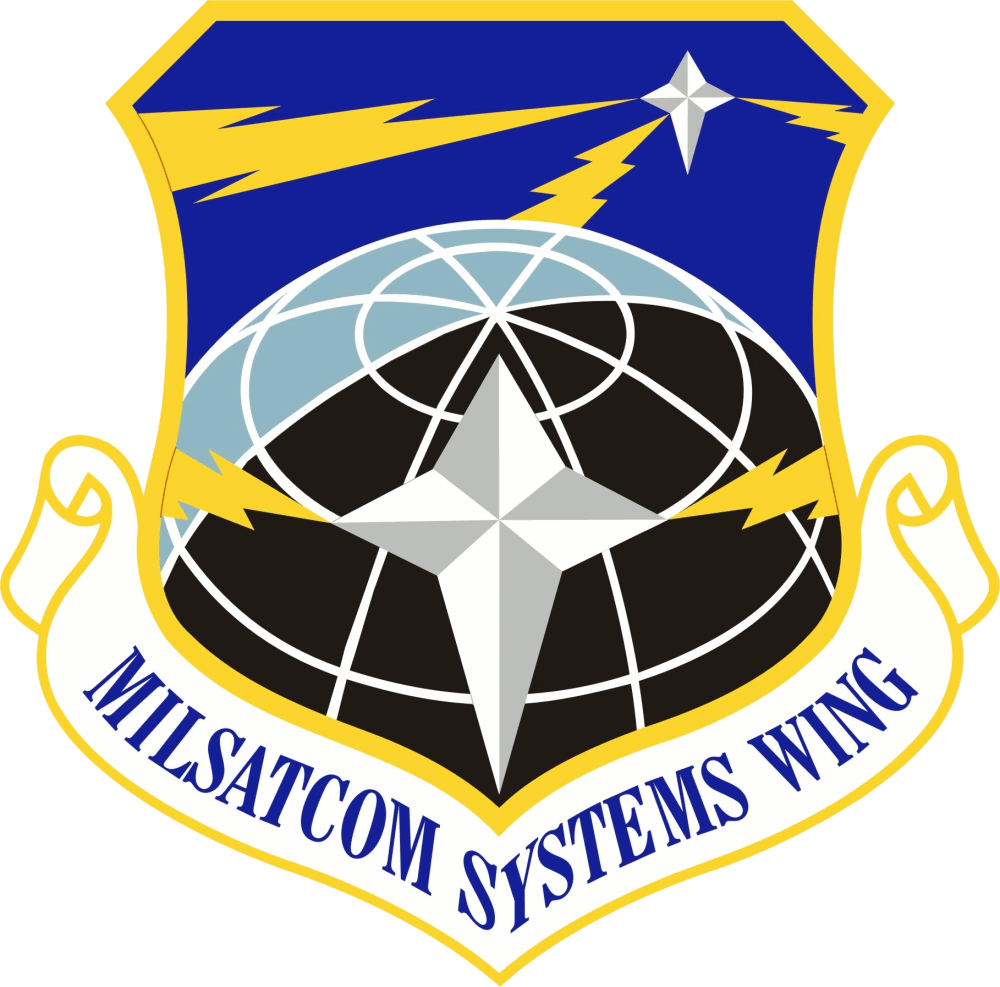
Military Satellite Communications Systems Wing

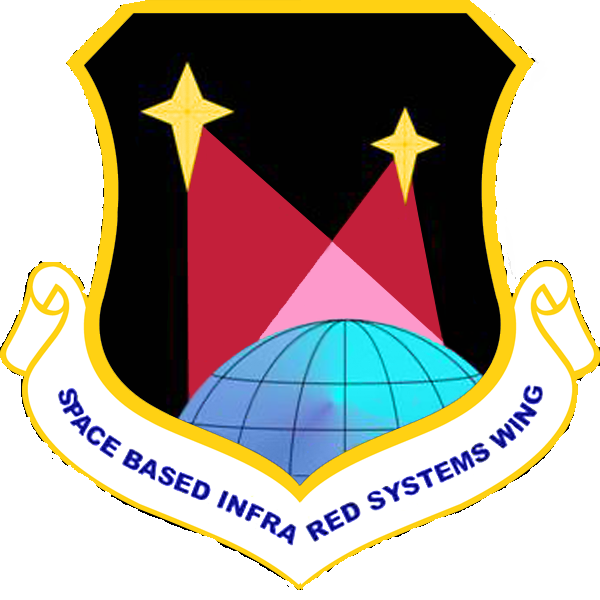
Space-Based Infrared Systems Wing

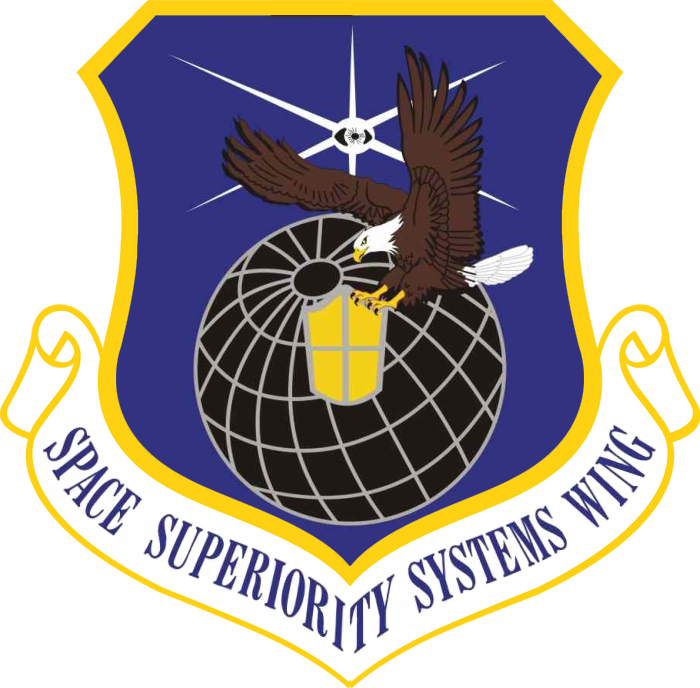
Space Superiority Systems Wing

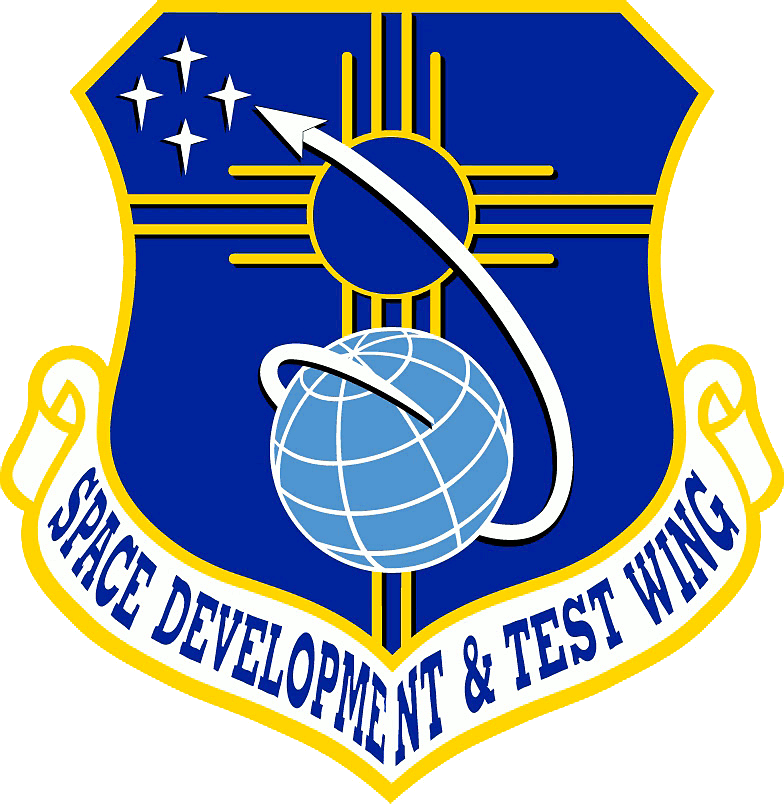
Space Development and Test Wing

61st Air Base Wing

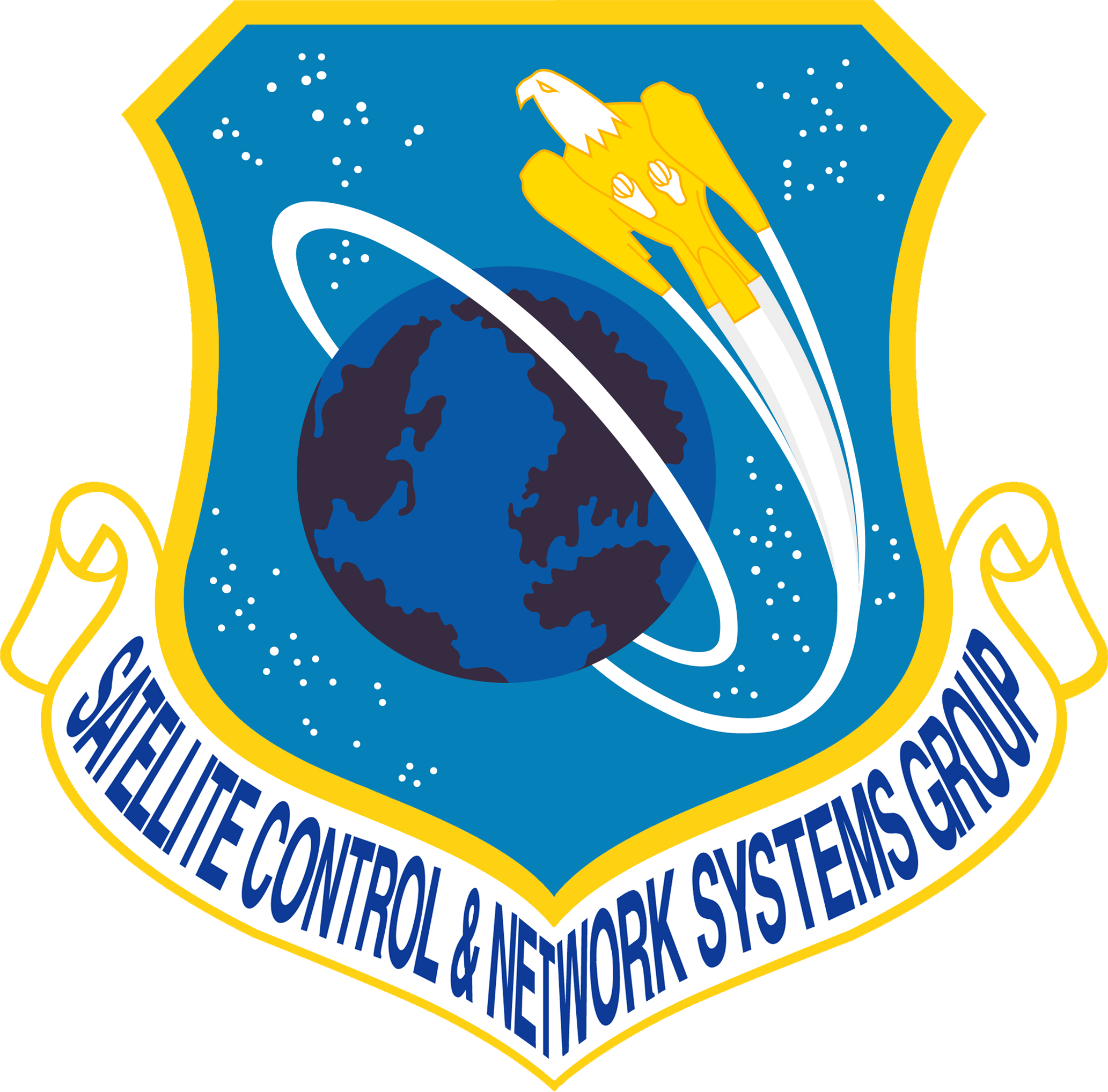
Satellite Control Network Systems Group

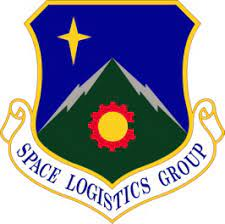
Space Logistics Group

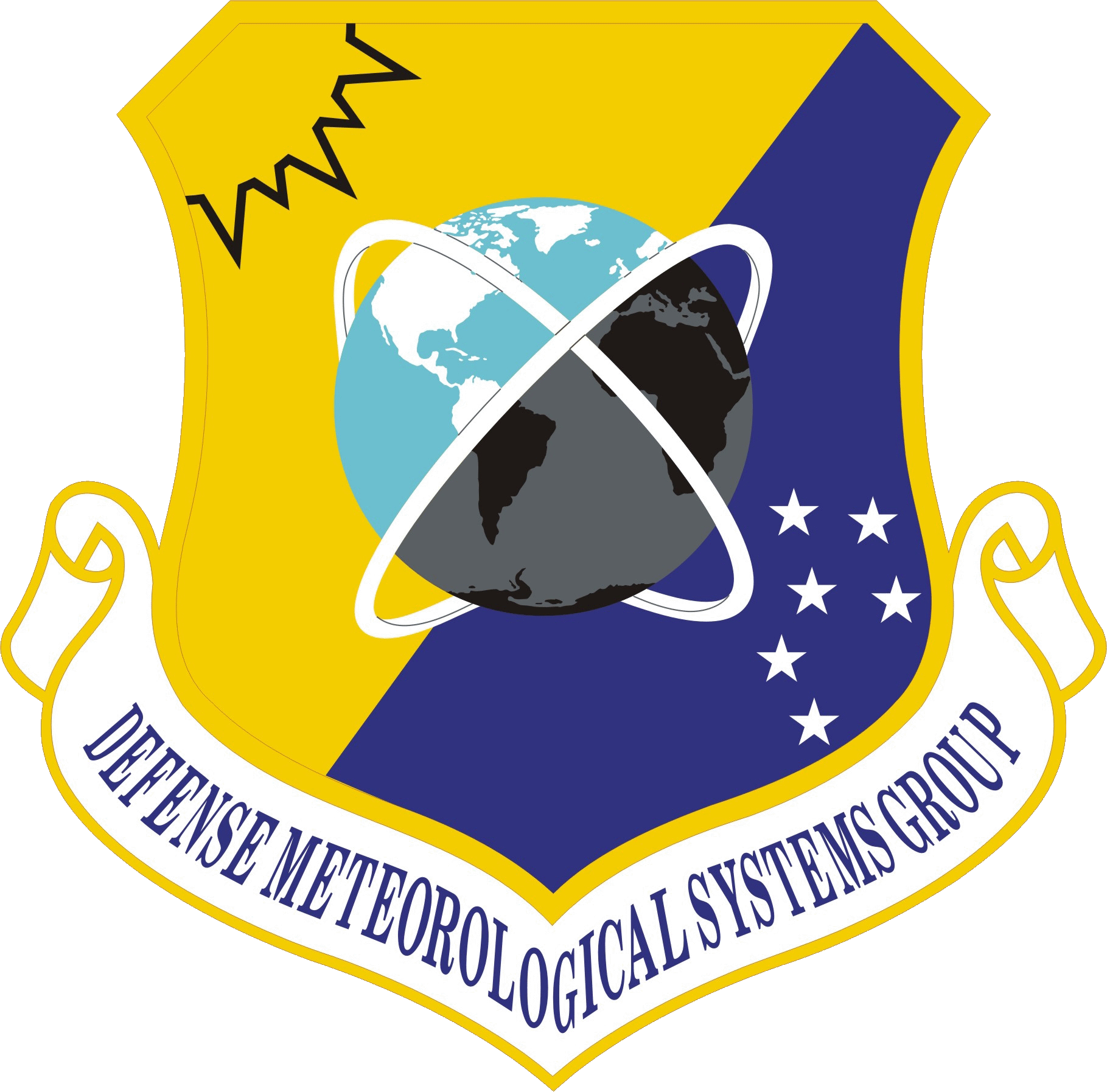
Defense Meteorological Satellite Program Systems Group

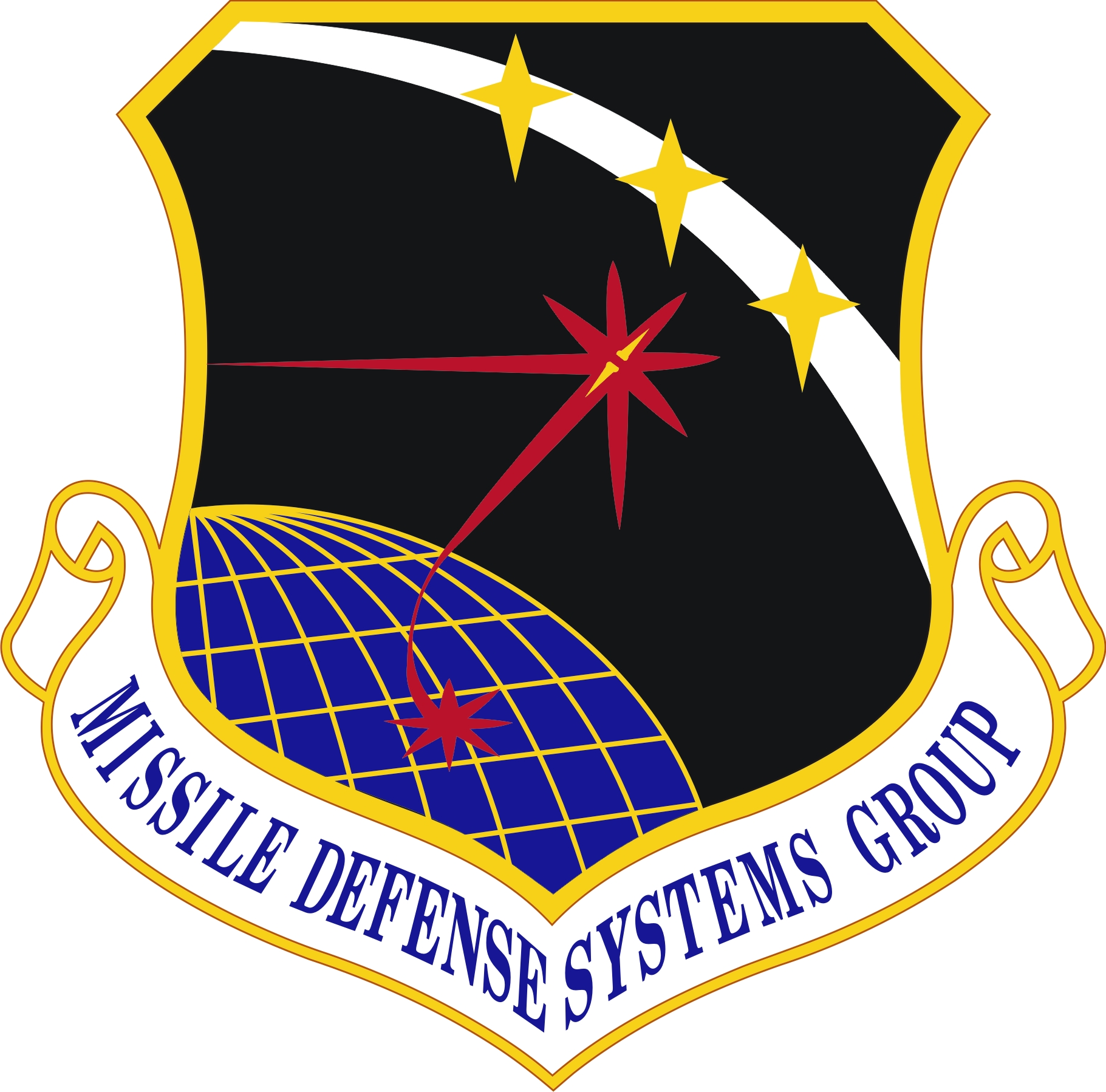
Missile Defense Systems Group

On 1 August 2006, the Space and Missile Systems Center reorganized itself along a traditional Air Force wing and group construct. These included the Military Satellite Communications Systems Wing which replaced the MILSATCOM Joint System Program Office (JPO), the Launch and Range Systems Wing, which replaced the Launch and Ranges JPO, the Global Positioning Systems Wing, which replaced the Navstar GPS JPO, the Space-Based Infrared Systems Wing, which replaced the SBIRS System Program Office (SPO), the Space Superiority Systems Wing, the Space Development and Test Wing at Kirtland Air Force Base, which included the former SMC Detachment 12, the 61st Air Base Wing, which replaced the 61st Air Base Group, the Satellite Control and Network Systems Group, which replaced the Air Force Satellite Control Network SPO, the Space Logistics Group, which replaced the SMC Logistics Support Squadron, and the Defense Meteorological Satellite Program Systems Group, which replaced the DMSP SPO. On 31 March 2008, the Missile Defense Systems Group was activated.

Space and Missile Systems Center directorates and divisions (2010–2019)
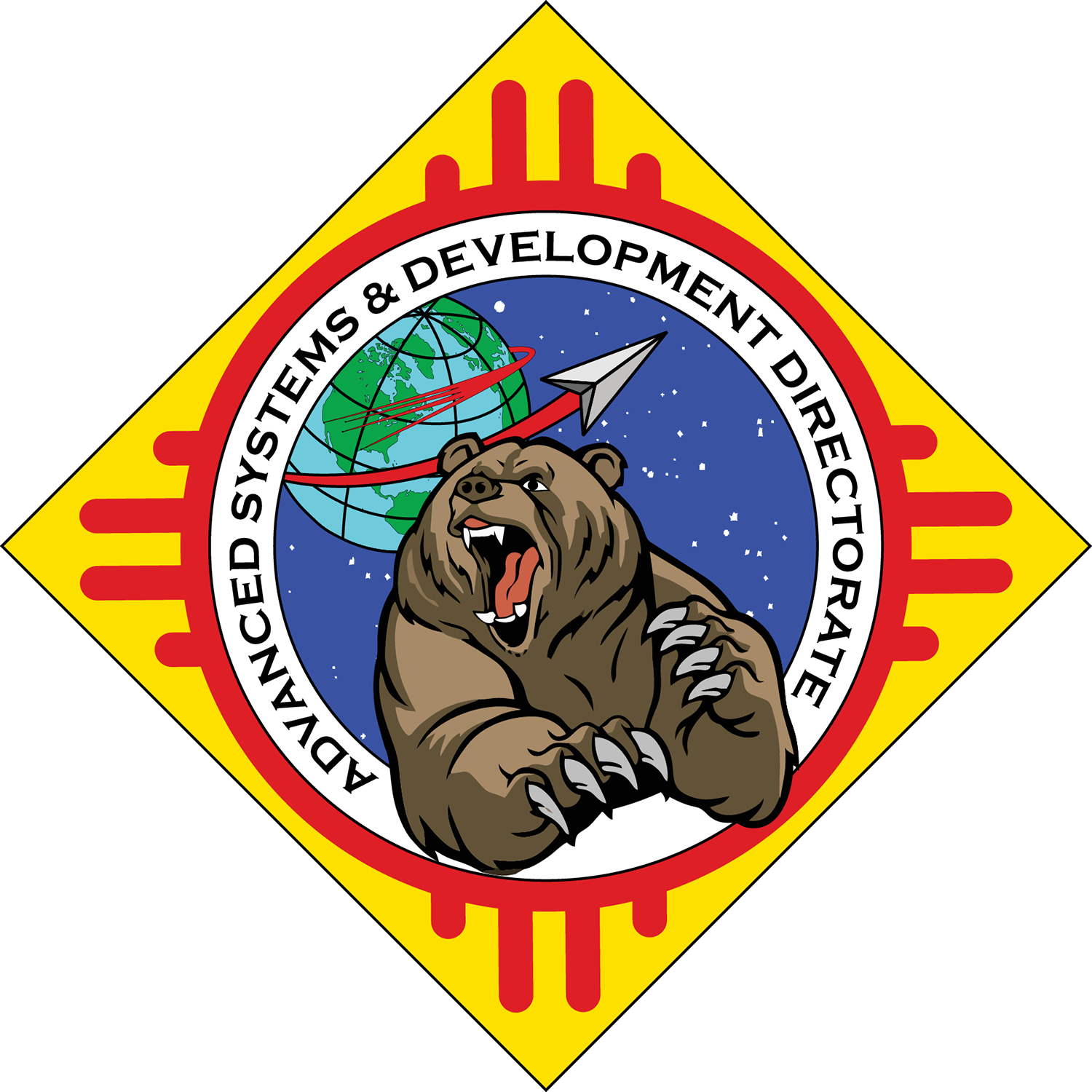
Advanced Systems and Development Directorate

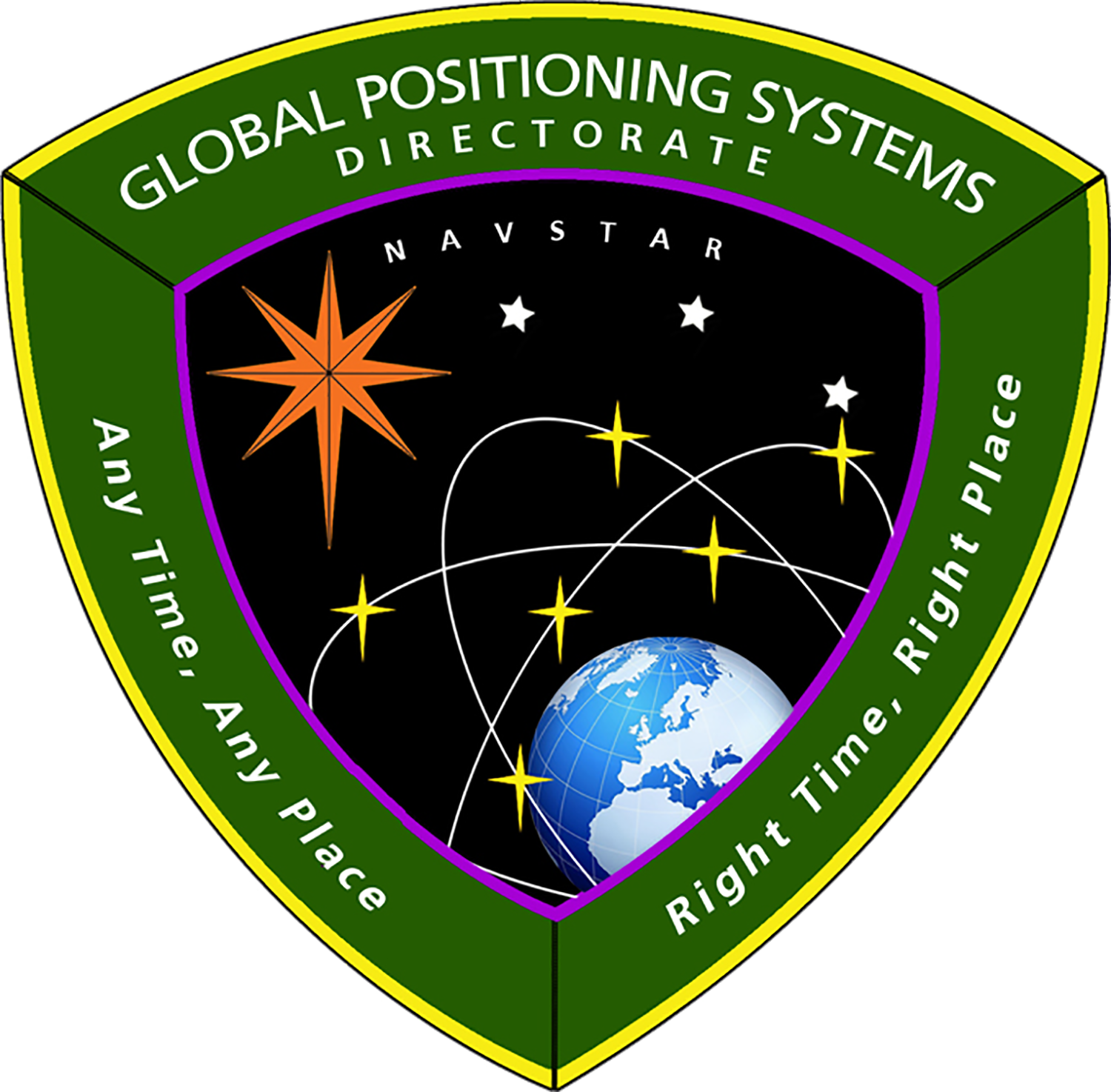
Global Positioning Systems Directorate

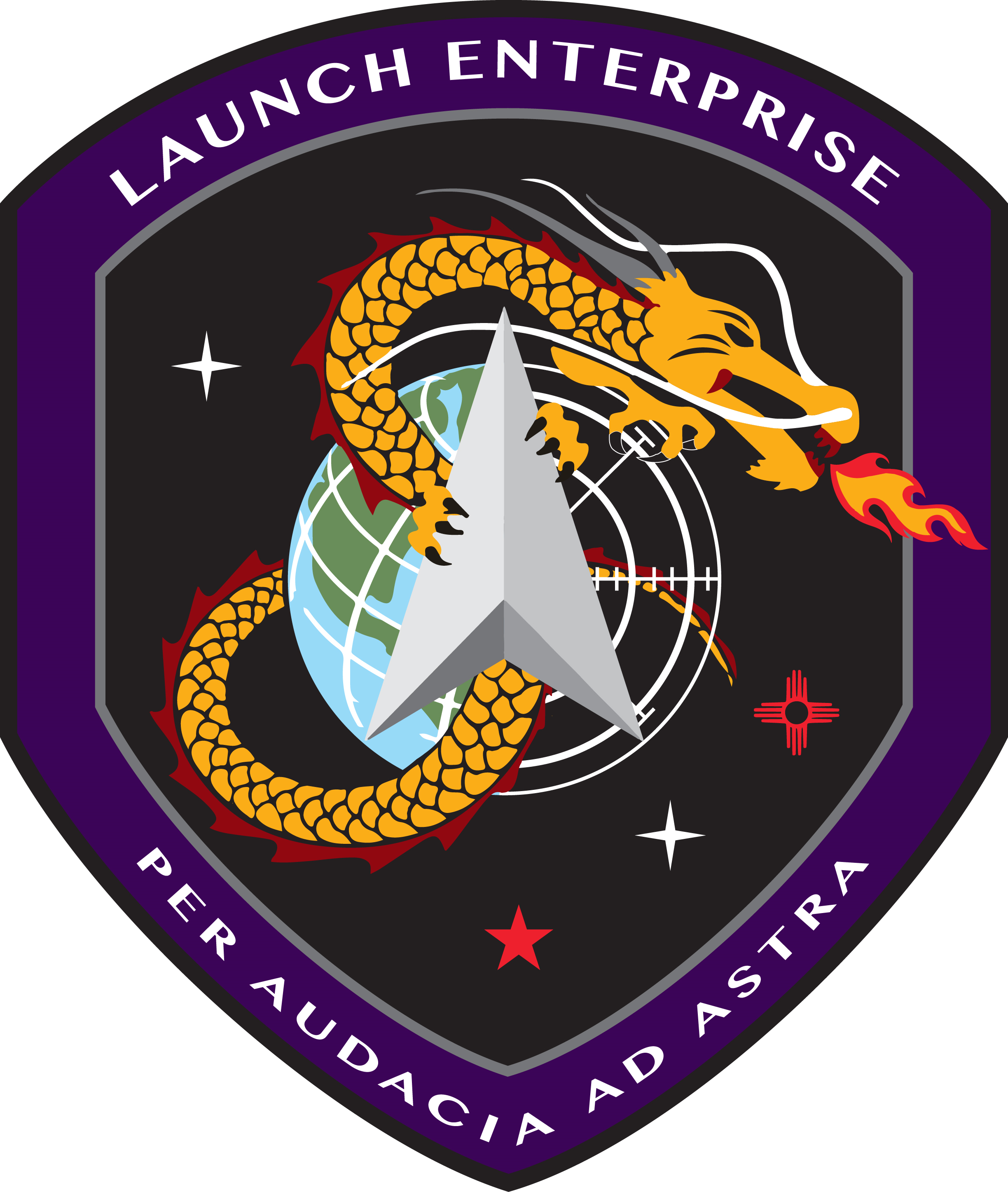
Launch Enterprise Directorate

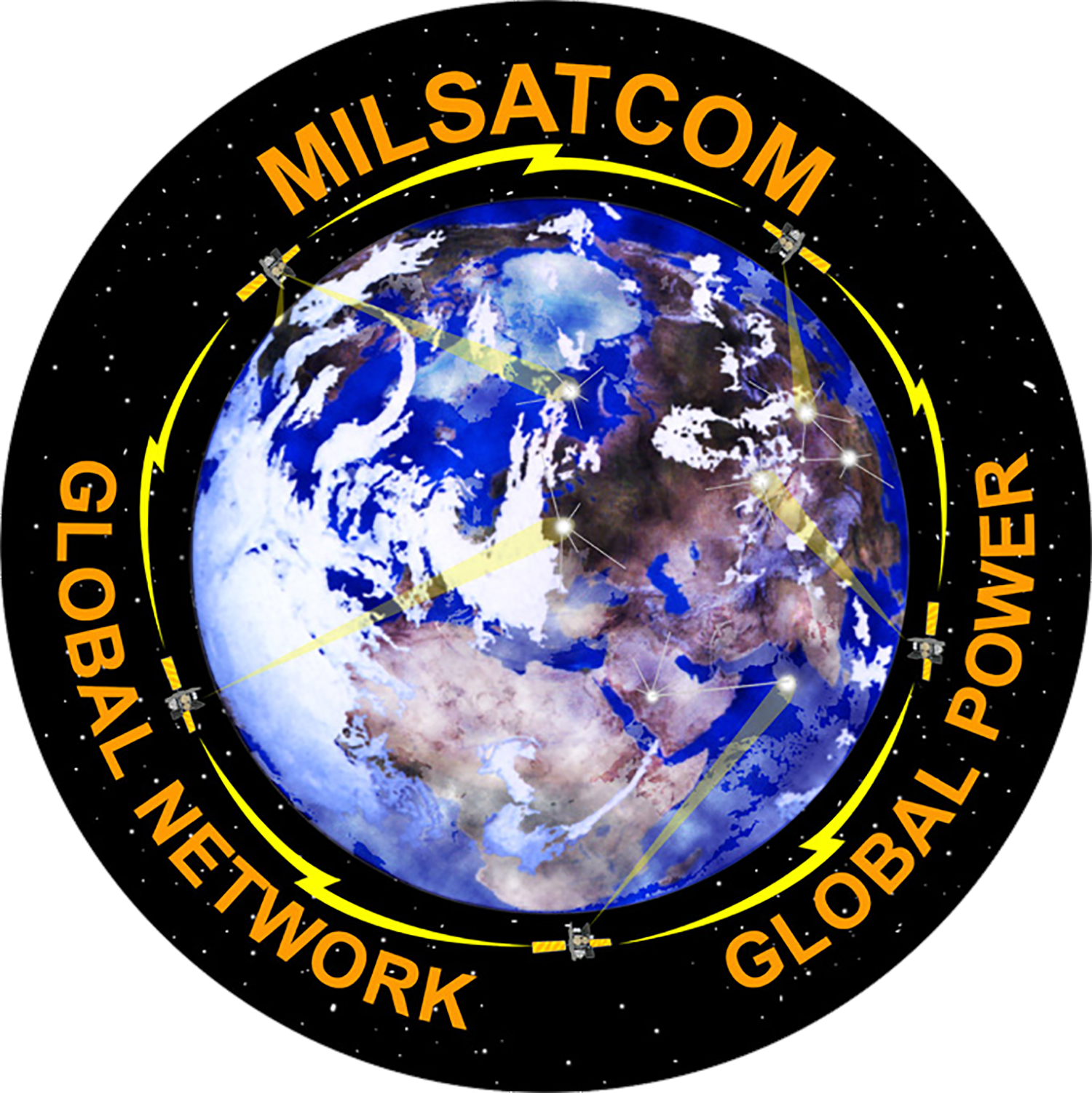
Military Satellite Communications Directorate

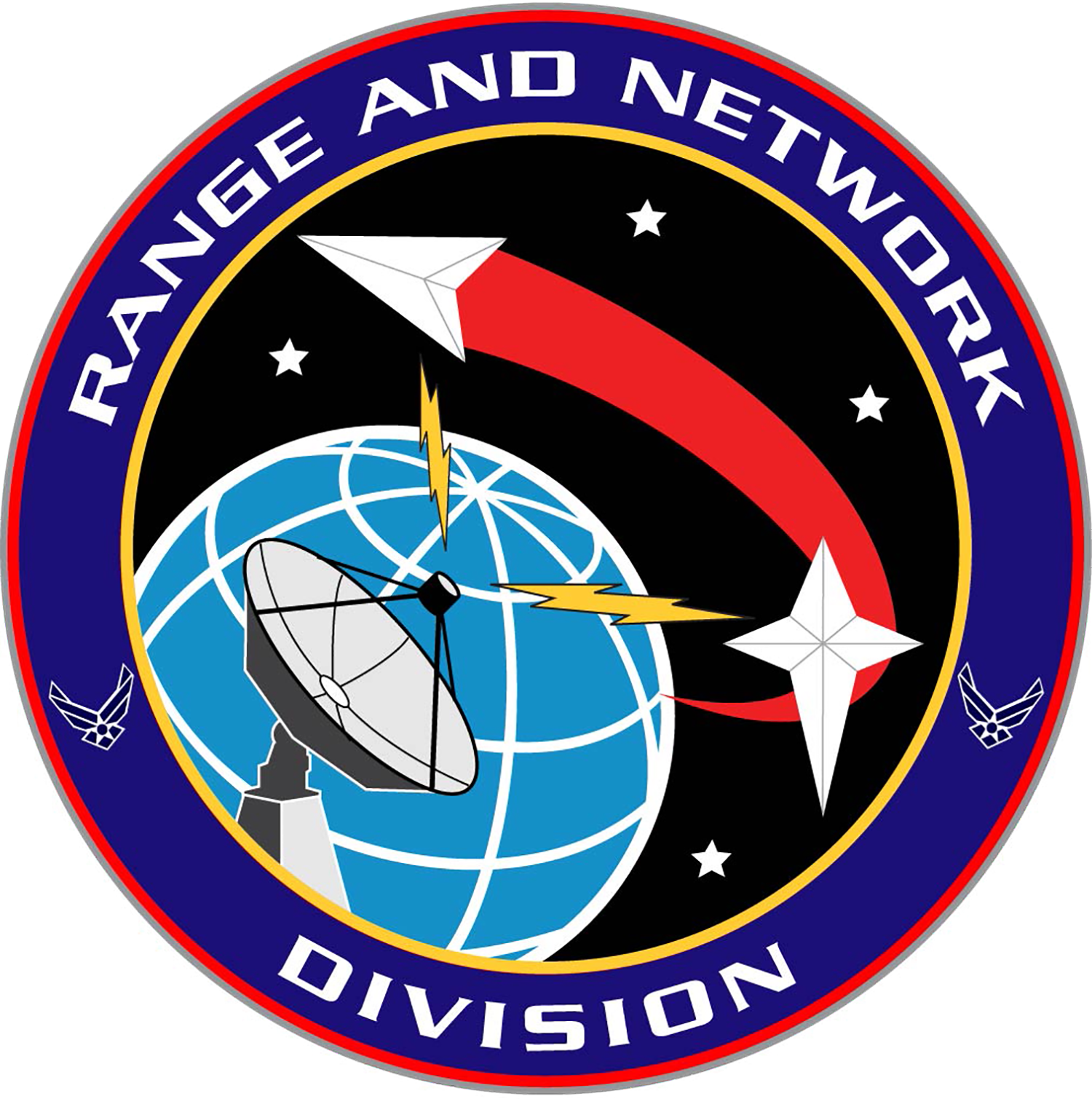
Range and Network Systems Division

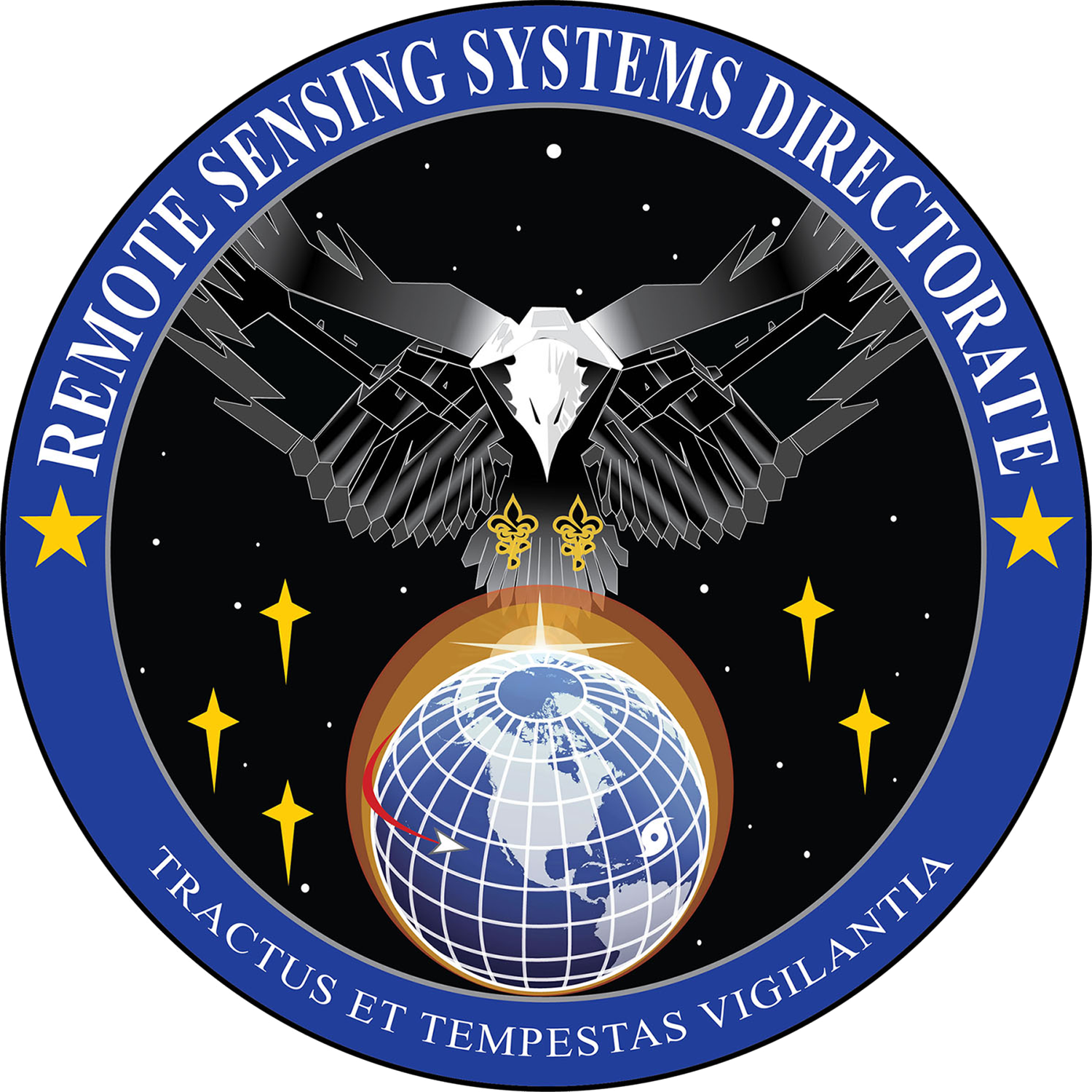
Remote Sensing Systems Directorate

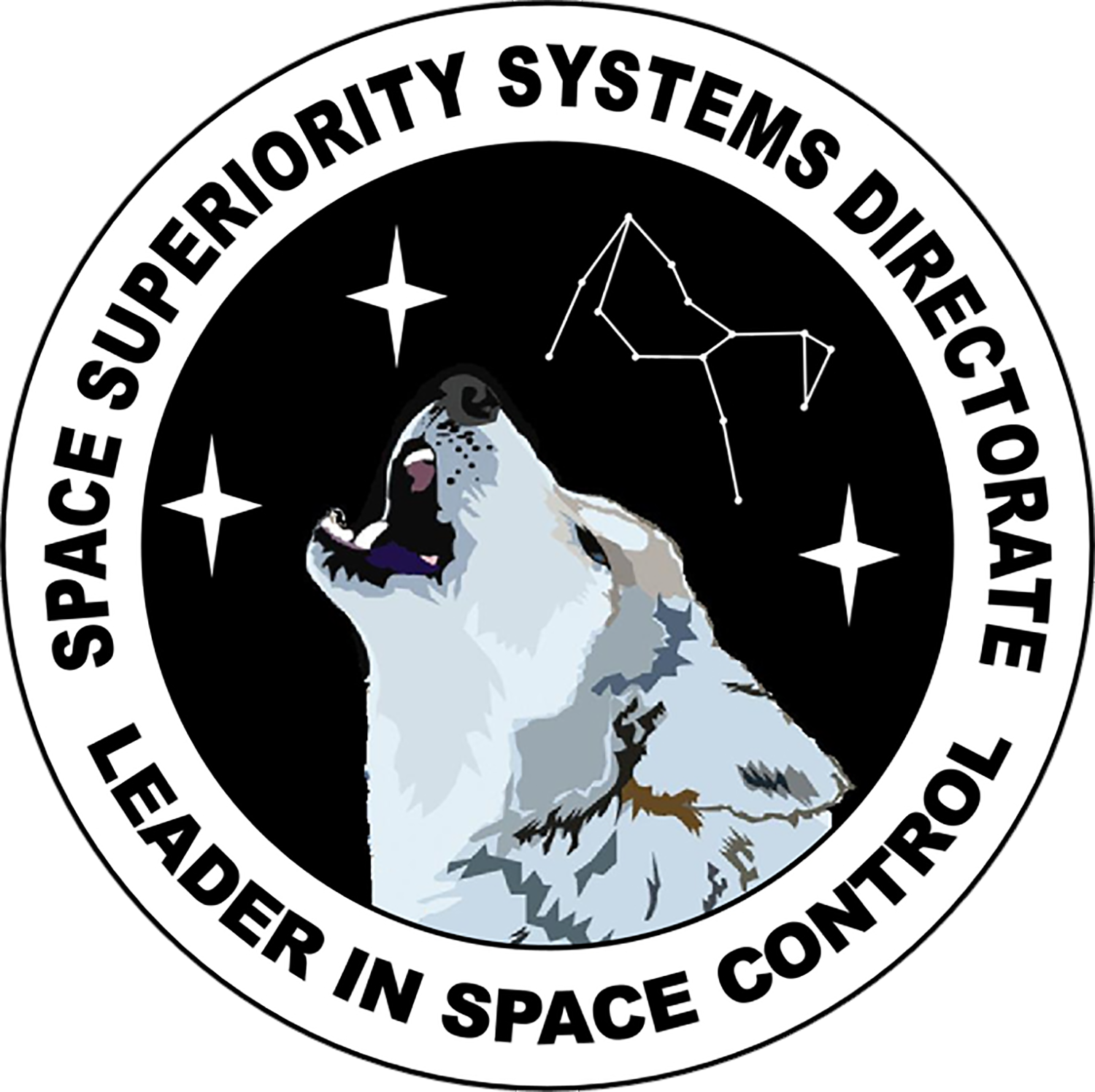
Space Superiority Systems Directorate

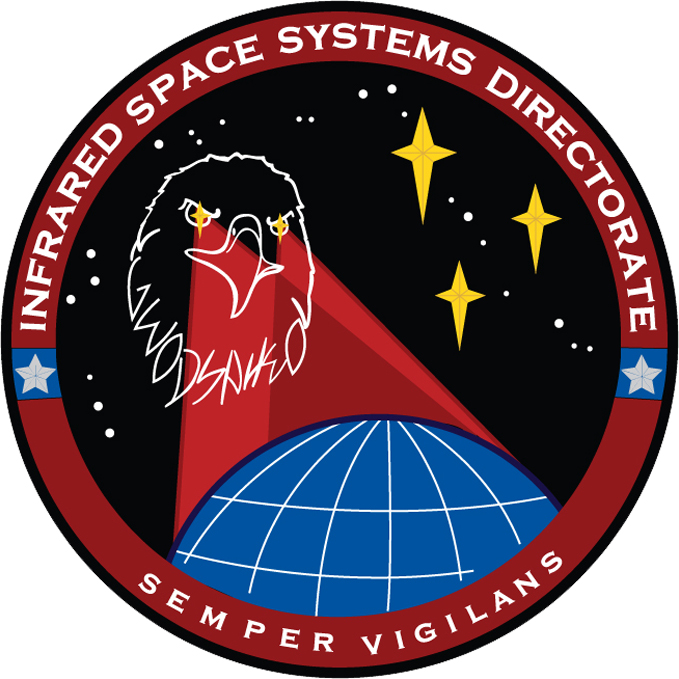
Infrared Space Systems Directorate

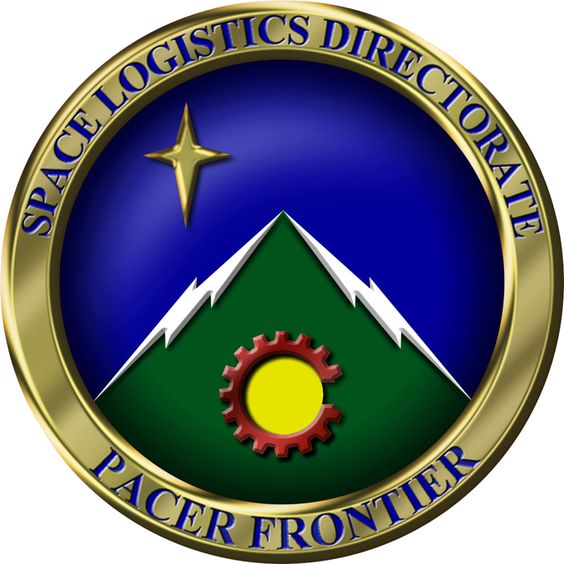
Space Logistics Directorate

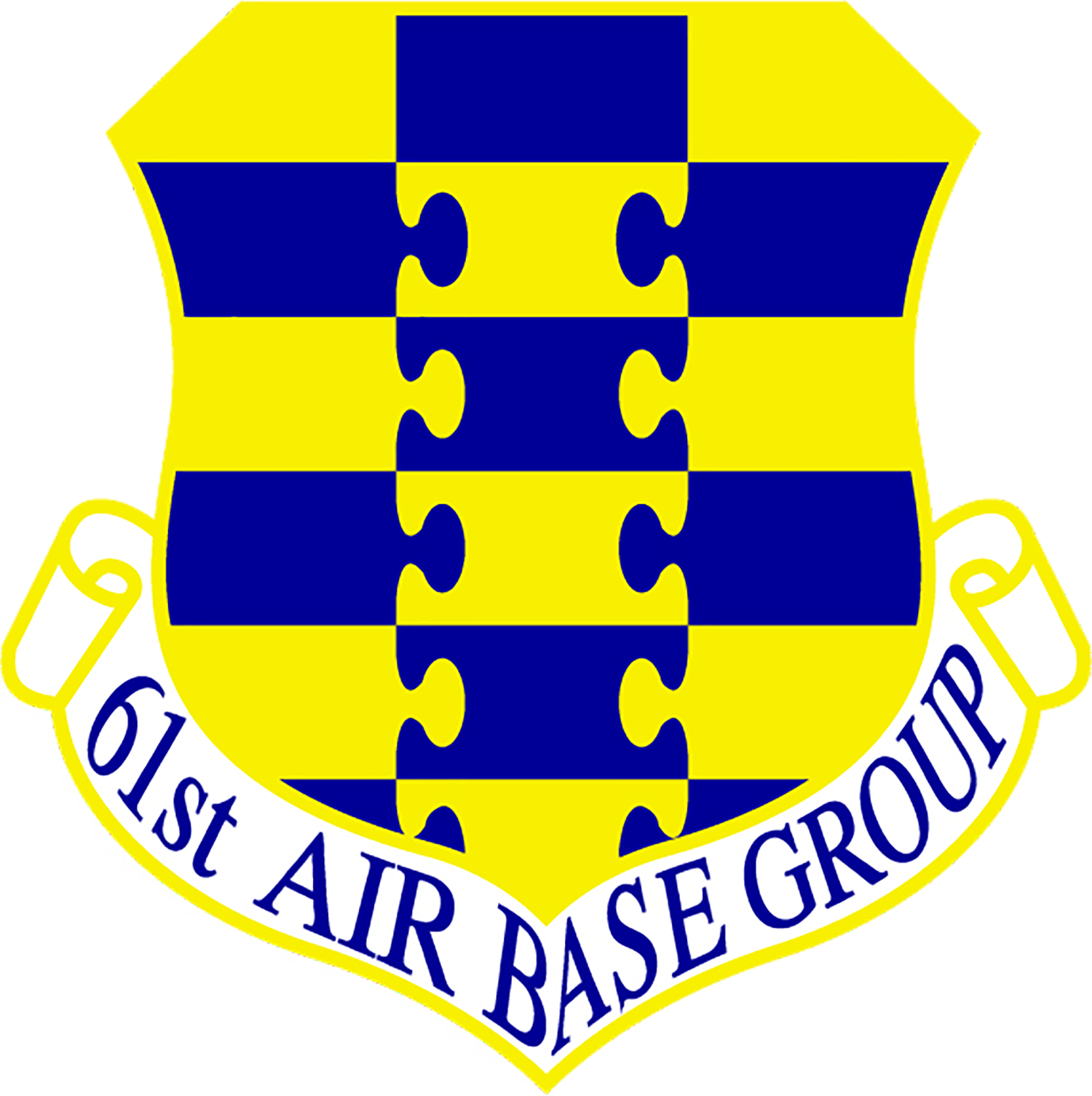
61st Air Base Group

However, in response to the lead of Air Force Materiel Command, on 10 November 2010 the wings and groups redesignated as directorates and divisions as part of an Air Force acquisitions wide effort. This resulted in the 61st Air Base Wing being inactivated and replaced with the 61st Air Base Group, the GPS Wing becoming the Global Positioning Systems Directorate, the Launch and Range Systems Wing becoming the Launch Enterprise Directorate, the MILSATCOM Wing becoming the Military Satellite Communications Directorate, the Space Superiority Systems Wing becoming the Space Superiority Systems Directorate, the SIBRS Wing becoming the Infrared Space Systems Directorate, the Space Development and Test Wing becoming the Space Development and Test Directorate, the Space Logistics Group becoming the Space Logistics Directorate, the DMSP Group becoming the Defense Weather Systems Directorate, the Missile Defense Systems Group becoming the Missile Defense Systems Division, and the Satellite Control and Network Systems Group becoming the Satellite Control and Network Systems Division

In 2014, the Space and Missile Systems Center combined its Developmental Planning Directorate and the Space Development and Test Directorate to form the Advanced Systems and Development Directorate. The Range and Network Systems Division was eventually stood up to replace the functions of the Satellite Control and Network Systems Division and in 2015 the Defense Weather Systems Directorate and Infrared Space Systems Directorate were combined into the Remote Sensing Systems Directorate. In 2019, these directorates were all replaced as part of the SMC 2.0 reorganization, which instead established the Development Corps, which was responsible for innovation and prototyping, a Production Corps, an Enterprise Corps, which conducted support for products and launch, and an Atlas Corps which provided personnel management.

=== Redesignation as Space Systems Command and transfer to the Space Force ===
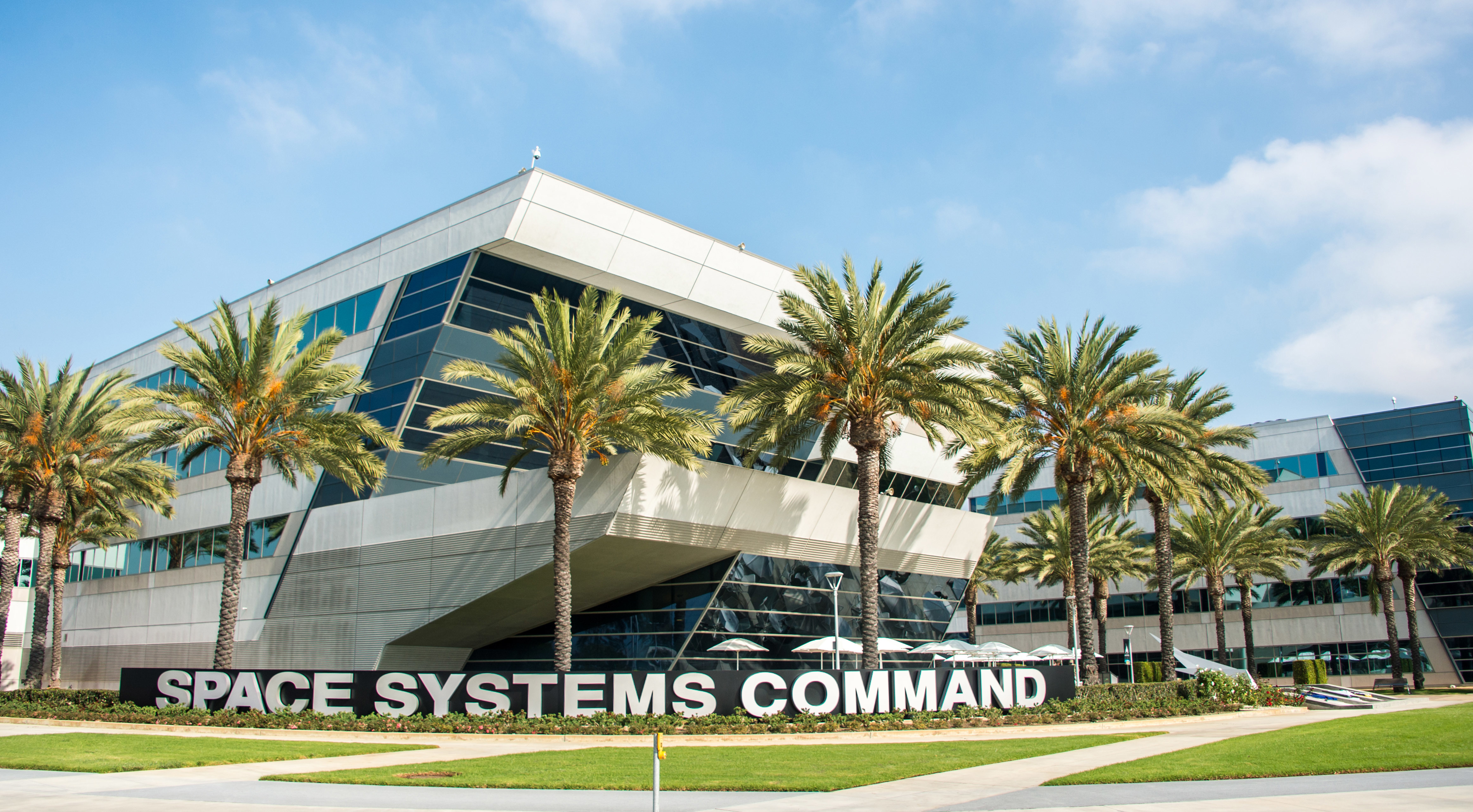
Headquarters of Space Systems Command

When the United States Space Force was established as an independent service on 20 December 2019, Air Force Space Command was redesignated as United States Space Force, but functionally remained a major command within the Air Force. The Space and Missile Systems Center remained a part of United States Space Force as it was redesignated as Space Operations Command, until it was reassigned to Headquarters Space Force on 22 April 2021 and officially transferred from the U.S. Air Force center to a U.S. Space Force field command, although it continued to use the Space and Missile Systems Center name.

In July 2021, President Biden nominated Deputy Director of the National Reconnaissance Office Maj Gen Michael Guetlein to lead Space Systems Command. He was confirmed with a promotion to lieutenant general on 29 July 2021 which became effective on 13 August 2021.

On 13 August 2021, the Space and Missile Systems Center was redesignated as Space Systems Command on 13 August 2021. The commander is a Space Force lieutenant general, while the deputy command is a Space Force major general and is also responsible for space launch. In addition to Space and Missile Systems Center units realigning, the 61st Air Base Group was redesignated the Los Angeles Garrison. Space Systems Command also gained Space Launch Delta 30 and Space Launch Delta 45, which they had given up to Air Force Space Command in 1990. The commander of Space Launch Delta 45, a brigadier general, is the Space Systems Command operations director and range acquisitions lead. Air Force Research Laboratory space units, such as the Space Vehicles Directorate, Space Electro-Optical Division, Rocket Propulsion Division, and Space Systems Technology Division, administratively report to Space Systems Command, while remaining under the aligned under Air Force Research Labs. The Air Force Life Cycle Management Center's Strategic Warning and Surveillance Systems Division, responsible for ground-based radars, missile warning, space domain awareness, missile defense systems, and shared early warning capabilities, transferred to Space Systems Command. Space Systems Command also provides support to the Space Rapid Capabilities Office and Space Development Agency (to be transferred in 2022), which are direct reporting units to the Chief of Space Operations.

=== Further developments ===
One 8 December 2023, SSC stood up the first two provisional System Deltas (SYDs) in an activation and assumption of command ceremony at the Los Angeles Air Force Base.

The two SYDs will prototype a new concept to maximize the recently announced provisional Integrated Mission Deltas (IMDs), which are organized around mission areas (e.g. position, navigation, and timing; electromagnetic warfare) instead of functional ones (e.g. intelligence, operations, cyber effects). The new Deltas were announced by the Chief of Space Operations Gen. Chance Saltzman in a CSO Notice To Guardians published 13 October 2023.

SYDs will consolidate program offices in SSC that design, develop, and deliver mission systems under a mission-focused command structure for acquisitions. IMDs will consolidate all aspects of mission-area readiness into a single organization, combining units in Space Operations Command (SpOC) that perform mission generation, intelligence support, and cyber defense with program offices at SSC that handle sustainment.

Pairing IMDs in SpOC with complementary SYDs in SSC will streamline unity of effort for capability development.

== Symbolism ==
Emblems of Space Systems Command and its predecessors
Space Systems Command (2021–present)

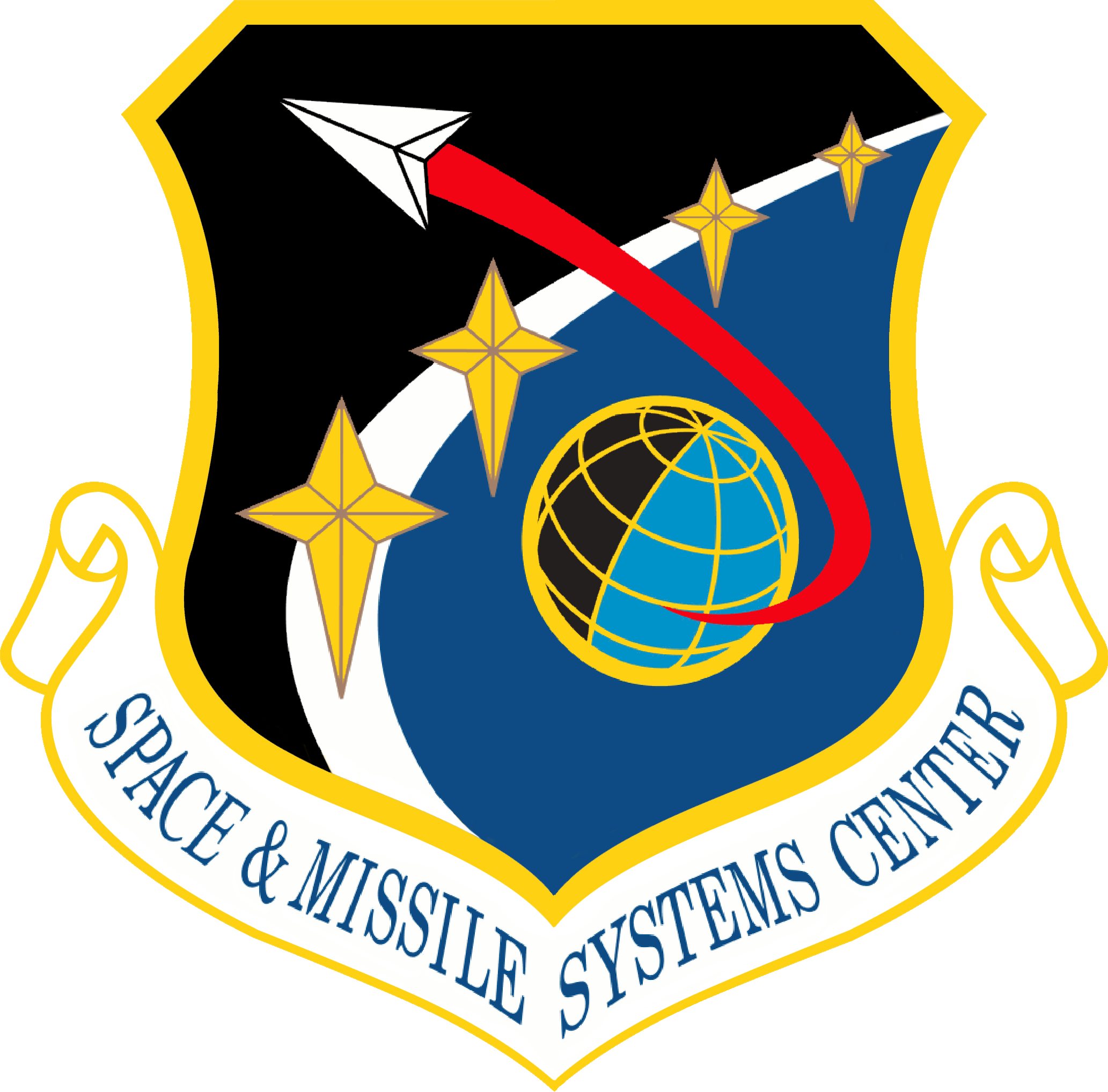
Space and Missile Systems Center (2002–2021)

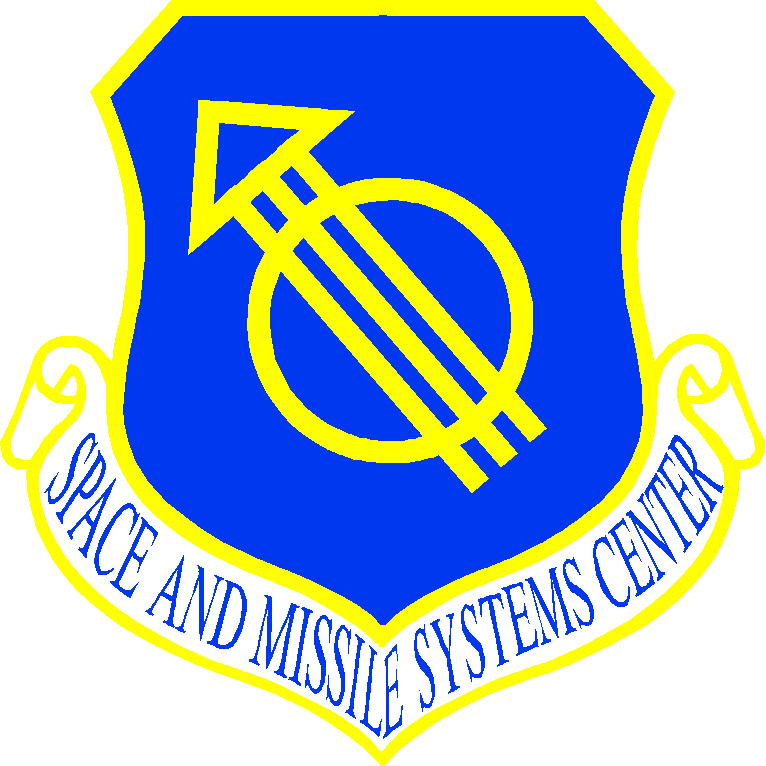
Space and Missile Systems Center, Space Systems Division, Space Division, and Space and Missile Systems Organization (1968–2002)

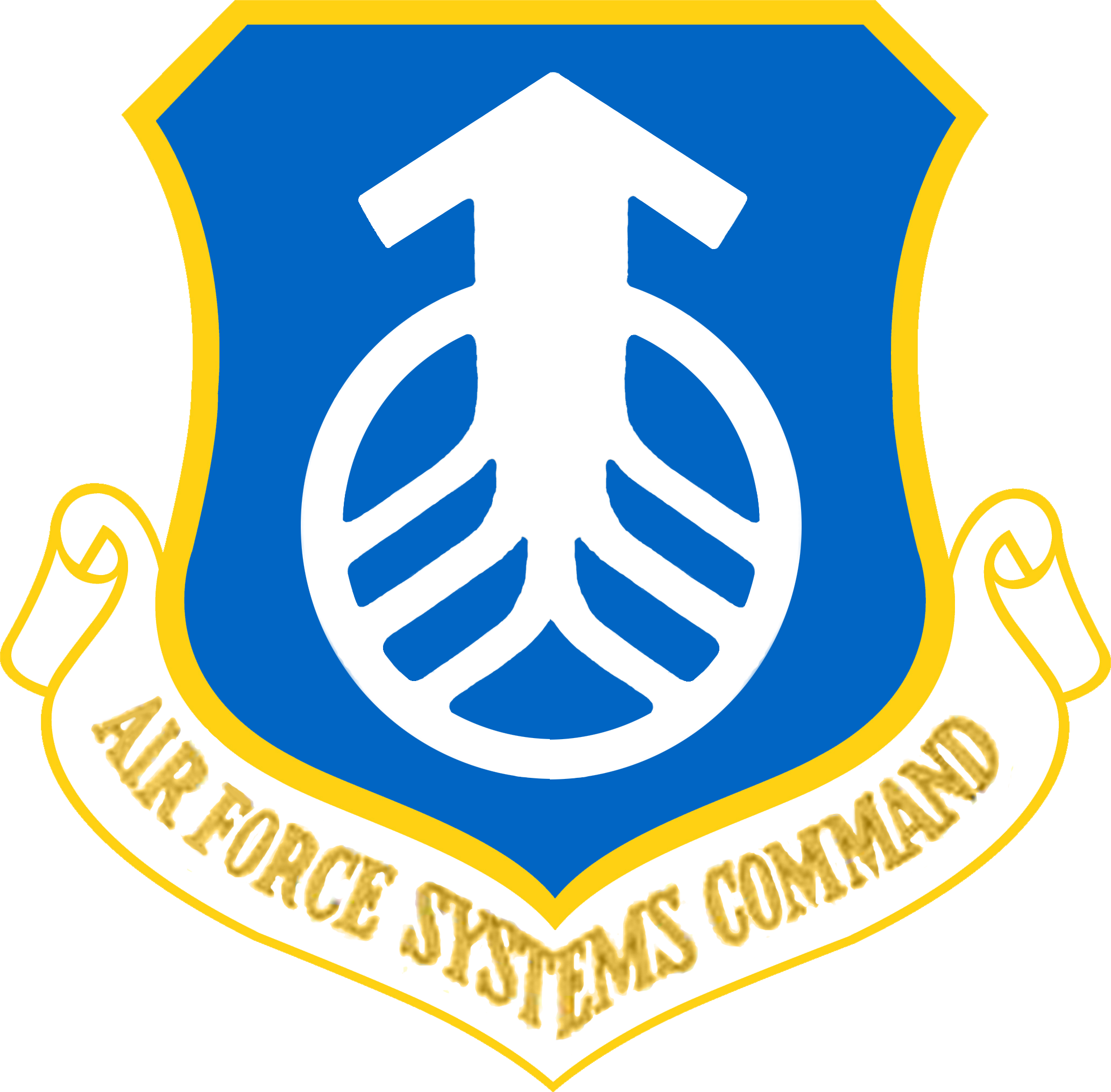
Space and Missile Systems Organization (1967–1968)

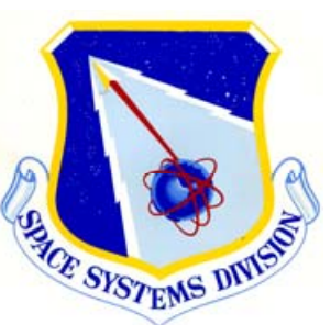
Space Systems Division (1962–1967)

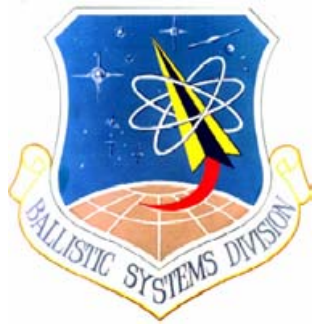
Ballistic Systems Division (1962–1967)

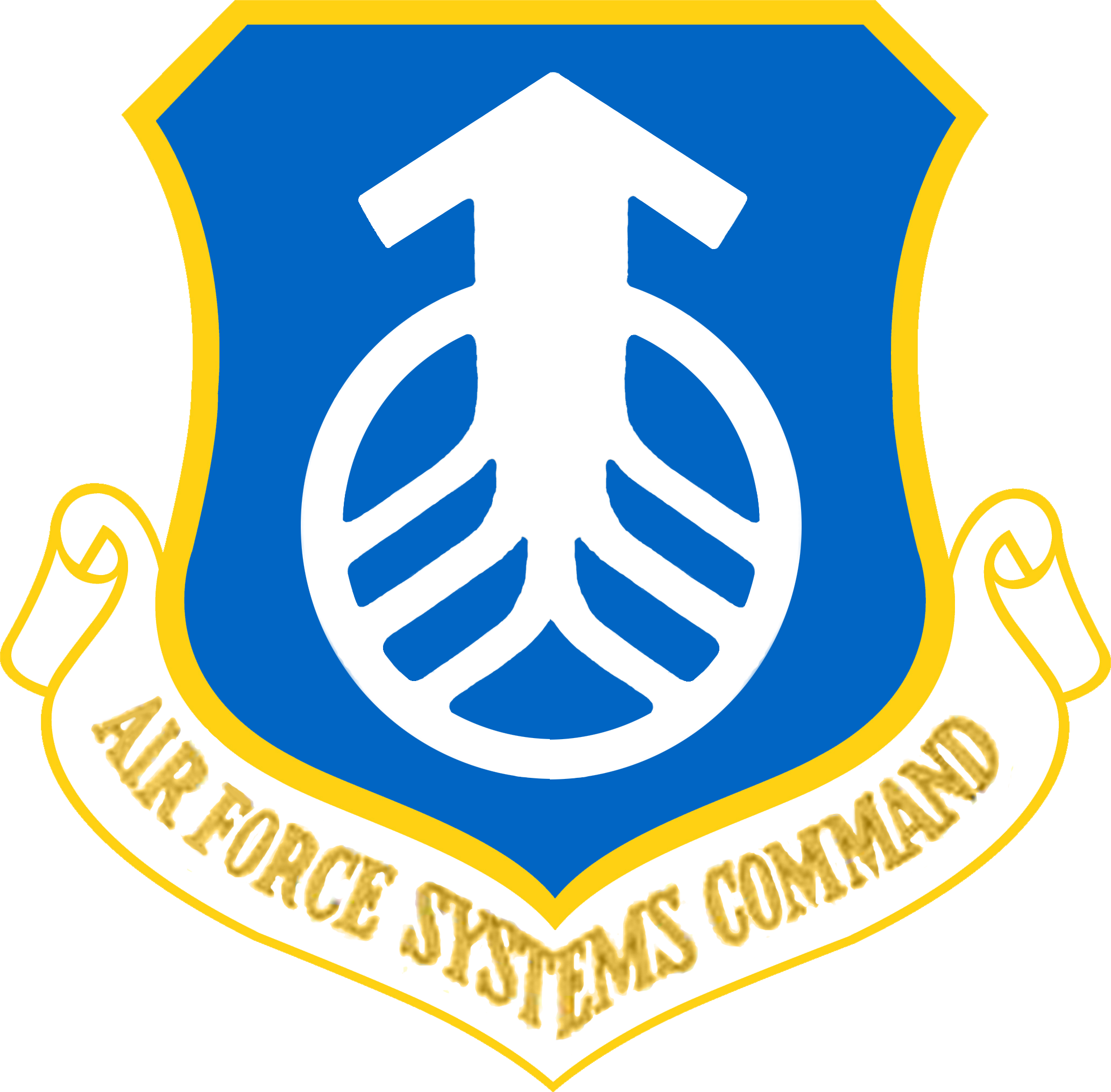
Space Systems Division and Ballistic Systems Division (1961–1962)

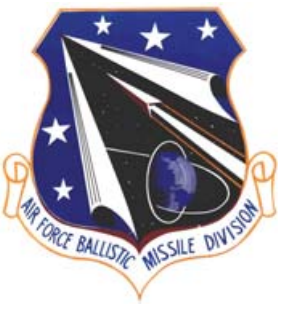
Air Force Ballistic Missile Division (1960–1961)

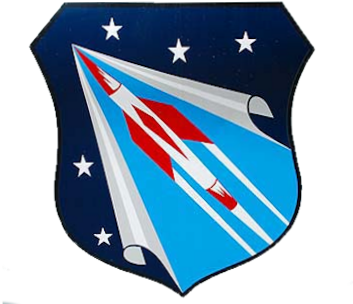
Western Development Division and Air Force Ballistic Missile Division (1954–1960)

=== Space Systems Command emblem and color ===
At the top of the design, rising into space, is a delta riding on an ignition plume. The delta and plume represent the launch vehicles need to place Space Force assets into orbit and signifies launch operations from West and East coast ranges. The constellation Aquila symbolizes the space environment, reflecting Space Systems Command's developing and fielding of space warfighting capabilities. The primary star represents the Space Force's on-orbit capabilities. The sweeping orbit and thunderbolt represent the Space Force's space assets safeguarding the Earth.

Gold is Space Systems Command's distinguishing color and signifying the excellence and intelligence required to identify, prototype, and field innovative space capabilities.

The Space Systems Command emblem and flag were unveiled on 13 April 2021, replacing the Space and Missile Systems Center emblem.

=== Post–2002 Space and Missile Systems Center emblem ===
After space and missiles functions were reunited under the Space and Missile Systems Center, it continued to use the old Space and Missile Systems Organization emblem for 10 years. However, when the Space and Missile Systems Center transferred from Air Force Materiel Command to Air Force Space Command it adopted a new emblem on 2 August 2002 to better express its mission and allegiance to Air Force Space Command.

Blue and yellow are the Air Force colors. Blue alludes to the sky, the primary theater of Air Force operations. Yellow refers to the sun and the excellence required of Air Force personnel. The globe represents the night and day missions that the satellite and missile systems must perform. The four pole stars symbolize the communication, navigation, surveillance and weather satellites utilized by the Center. The flight symbol stands for deployed missile systems.

=== Pre–2002 Space and Missile Systems Center, Space Division, and Space and Missile Systems Organization emblem ===
When the Space and Missile Systems Organization was activated in 1967, it determined it needed a new emblem to represent its space and missile missions. The SAMSO emblem was first approved on 22 May 1968. When the Space Division was established in 1979, it continued to use the SAMSO emblem but reinterpreted it. When the Space and Missile Systems Center was established in 1992, the dual space and missile symbiology was restored. The emblem was replaced in 2002 when the Space and Missile Systems Center transferred to Air Force Space Command.

The Space and Missile Systems Center Organizational emblem represents the cooperation of science, industry, and the military in advancing the defense technology of the United States, and the role of SMC in unifying and directing this effort. It also symbolizes the two major elements of the Organization's mission-- missile and space booster power and satellites in orbit.

In the first symbolism, the diagonal lines represent the role of science, industry, and the military, respectively, in advancing defense technology; and the triangle depicts the function of SMC in directing and managing the work of these elements in the pursuit of desired military objectives. The circle surrounding the diagonal lines represents the total integrating role of SMC in planning, developing and testing military systems and in acquiring them for the national defense.

In the second symbolism, the triangle joined by the three lines symbolizes rocket booster power for payloads as the basis for both ballistic missile and space systems, while the circle represents both satellites and their orbital traces.

=== Air Force Ballistic Missile Division, Space Systems Division, and Ballistic Systems Division ===
When the Western Development Division was first established in 1954, it used the emblem of its major command, Air Research and Development Command. This was carried over by the Air Force Ballistic Missile Division until it created its own emblem on 2 November 1960, which was based on Air Research and Development Command's. However, with the activation of Air Force Systems Command in 1961, the Air Force Ballistic Missile Division was split.

The Space Systems Division was established in 1961 and modified the Air Force Ballistic Missile Division's emblem to form its own, was used from 5 July 1962 until the Space and Missile Systems Organization was formed in 1967. The Ballistic Systems Division also modified elements of the Air Force Ballistic Missile Division, having its emblem approved on 14 February 1962. The Ballistic Systems Division's emblem was retired following the Space and Missile Systems Organization's establishment in 1967, but the Ballistic Missile Office received authorization to use it starting on 1 December 1980, and it was continuously used by the Ballistic Systems Division and Ballistic Missile Organization until it was inactivated on 2 September 1993.

== Structure ==
Delta	Headquarters	Current commander
Space Systems Command
Space Base Delta 3 (SBD 3)	Los Angeles Air Force Base, California	Col Mia L. Walsh
Space Acquisition Management Delta	Peterson Space Force Base, Colorado	
Assured Access To Space Directorate (AATS or SSC/AA)
Acquisition Delta – Mission Solutions (AAM)	Los Angeles Air Force Base, California	Col Chad W. Melone
Acquisition Delta – Launch Execution (AAL)	Los Angeles Air Force Base, California	Col James T. Horne
Space Launch Delta 30 (SLD 30)	Vandenberg Space Force Base, California	Col Mark A. Shoemaker
Space Launch Delta 45 (SLD 45)	Patrick Space Force Base, Florida	Brig Gen Kristin Panzenhagen
Battle Management Command, Control, and Communications Directorate (BMC3 or SSC/BC)
Acquisition Delta – Operational Command and Control	Los Angeles Air Force Base, California	Col Cecilia Montes de Oca
Acquisition Delta – Tactical Command and Control	Los Angeles Air Force Base, California	Col Peter C. Mastro
Product Support Delta – Data Transport	Peterson Space Force Base, Colorado	Shawn Sawyer
Military Communications & Positioning, Navigation, and Timing Directorate (MCPNT or SSC/CG)
Acquisition Delta – Tactical SATCOM (CGT)	Los Angeles Air Force Base, California	Charlotte M. Gerhart
Acquisition Delta – Strategic SATCOM (CGS)	Los Angeles Air Force Base, California	Col A. J. Ashby
Acquisition Delta – Narrowband SATCOM (CGN)	Naval Base Point Loma, California	Capt Peter J. Sheehy
Positioning, Navigation, and Timing System Delta (PNT SYD)	Los Angeles Air Force Base, California	Matthew L. Spencer
Space Sensing Directorate (SSC/SN)
Acquisition Delta – Commercial Space	Washington, D.C.	Col Richard Kniseley
Acquisition Delta – Resilient Missile Warning, Tracking, Defense (SNR)	Los Angeles Air Force Base, California	Col Heather B. Bogstie
Acquisition Delta – Environmental and Tactical Surveillance (SNS)	Los Angeles Air Force Base, California	Col Daniel J. Visosky
Acquisition Delta – Strategic Missile Warning	Los Angeles Air Force Base, California	Col Daniel T. Walter
Product Support Delta – Space Sensing (SNP)	Peterson Space Force Base, Colorado	Anita J. McCorvey
Space Domain Awareness and Combat Power Directorate (SDACP or SSC/SZ)
Acquisition Delta – Innovation and Prototyping (SZI)	Kirtland Air Force Base, New Mexico	Col Joseph J. Roth
Acquisition Delta – Warfighter Enterprise	Los Angeles Air Force Base, California	Col Corey J. Klopstein
Acquisition Delta – Space Warfighting (SZA)	Los Angeles Air Force Base, California	Col Erik S. Stockham
Acquisition Delta – Advanced MILSATCOM	Los Angeles Air Force Base, California	John Kirkemo
Acquisition Delta – Space Domain Awareness (SZG)	Peterson Space Force Base, Colorado	F. Schnell
Acquisition Delta – Strategic Warning and Surveillance Systems (SZQ)	Peterson Space Force Base, Colorado	Col Jason E. West
Electromagnetic Warfare System Delta	Los Angeles Air Force Base, California	Jordan Riedel

Denotes planned unit but not yet activated.

== List of commanders ==
No.	Commander		Term		
No.	Portrait	Name	Took office	Left office	Duration
1	Michael Guetlein	Lieutenant General; Michael Guetlein	13 August 2021	21 December 2023	2 years, 130 days
-	Joy M. White	Joy M. White; Acting	21 December 2023	1 February 2024	42 days
2	Philip Garrant	Lieutenant General; Philip Garrant	1 February 2024	Incumbent	2 years, 267 days

== Lineage ==
Space Systems Division

- Established as Space Systems Division, and activated, on 20 March 1961

Organized on 1 April 1961
Discontinued, and inactivated, on 1 July 1967

- Consolidated with the Space and Missile Systems Organization on 7 August 1989

Space Systems Command

- Established as the Space and Missile Systems Organization, and activated, on 25 May 1967 (not organized)

Organized on 1 Jul 1967
Redesignated Space Division on 1 October 1979
Redesignated Space Systems Division on 15 March 1989

- Consolidated with the first Space Systems Division on 7 August 1989

Redesignated Space and Missile Systems Center on 1 July 1992

- Status changed from unit of the United States Air Force to field command of the United States Space Force on 22 April 2021

Redesignated Space Systems Command on 13 August 2021#

=== Assignments ===
- Air Force Systems Command, 20 March 1961
- Air Force Materiel Command, 1 July 1992
- Air Force Space Command (later, United States Space Force; Space Operations Command), 1 October 2001;
- United States Space Force, 22 April 2021-.

== See also ==
U.S. Armed Forces systems commands

- Army Materiel Command
- Marine Corps Systems Command
- United States Navy systems commands
  - Naval Sea Systems Command
  - Naval Air Systems Command
  - Naval Information Warfare Systems Command
  - Naval Facilities Engineering Systems Command
  - Naval Supply Systems Command
