= Assistant Secretary of the Air Force for Space Acquisition and Integration =

American political post

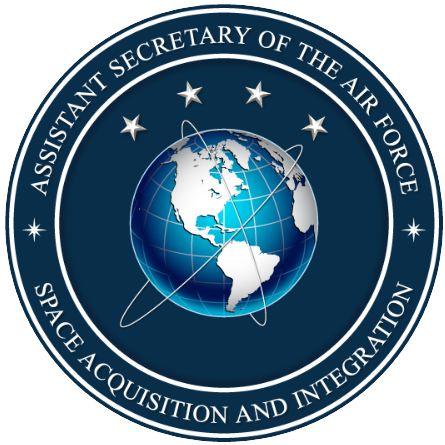
- SAF/SQ seal

- Flag of an assistant secretary of the Air Force

- Incumbent; Erich Hernandez-Baquero since August 24, 2026
- Department of the Air Force
- Style: Mr. Secretary; The Honorable (formal address in writing)
- Reports to: Secretary of the Air Force; Under Secretary of the Air Force
- Seat: The Pentagon, Arlington County, Virginia, United States
- Nominator: The president with Senate advice and consent
- Term length: No fixed term
- Constituting instrument: 10 U.S.C. § 9016
- Formation: 2019
- Succession: 18th in SecDef succession by seniority of appointment
- Deputy: Deputy Assistant Secretary of the Air Force for Space Acquisition and Integration
- Salary: Executive Schedule, Level IV
- Website: Official website

The assistant secretary of the air force for space acquisition and integration (SAF/SQ) is a civilian position in the United States Department of the Air Force that is appointed by the president of the United States and confirmed by the United States Senate. This position is established under Title 10 US Code Section 9016. The assistant secretary reports to the secretary of the Air Force.

== Responsibilities ==
The assistant secretary of the Air Force for space acquisition and integration serves as the space service acquisition executive (SAE) and the senior procurement executive for space programs in the Department of the Air Force.

== History ==
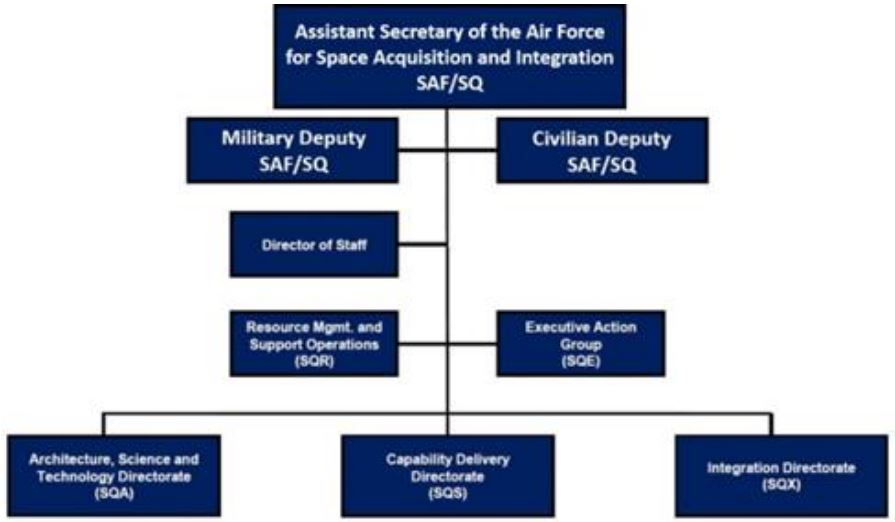
SAF/SQ Organizational chart

The position of the assistant secretary of the air force for space acquisition and integration was created in the National Defense Authorization Act for Fiscal Year 2020, signed on 20 December 2019, to oversee and direct the Space and Missile Systems Center, Space Rapid Capabilities Office, and Space Development Agency.

The position was directed to stand up as the Space Service Acquisition Executive (SAE) in 2022. Prior to this date, the position was responsible for advising the existing SAE for space programs, the ASAF for Acquisition, Technology, and Logistics (ASAF (AT&L), encoded as SAF/AQ). The Office of the Assistant Secretary of the Air Force for Space Acquisition and Integration (SAF/SQ) was created by merging the Office of the Principal Assistant to the Secretary of the Air Force for Space (SAF/SP) with the Office of the Assistant Secretary of the Air Force for Acquisition, Technology, and Logistics (SAF/AQS).

== List of assistant secretaries ==
No.	Assistant Secretary		Term			Ref
No.	Portrait	Name	Took office	Left office	Duration	Ref
Assistant Secretary for Space
1	Martin C. Faga	Martin C. Faga (1941–2023)	September 28, 1989	March 5, 1993	3 years, 158 days	
–	Jimmie D. Hill	Jimmie D. Hill; Acting	March 6, 1993	May 19, 1994	1 year, 75 days	
2	Jeffery K. Harris	Jeffery K. Harris	May 19, 1994	February 26, 1996	1 year, 283 days	
–	Keith R. Hall	Keith R. Hall (born 1947); Acting	February 27, 1996	March 28, 1997	1 year, 30 days	
3	Keith R. Hall	Keith R. Hall (born 1947)	March 28, 1997	December 13, 2001	4 years, 260 days	
Deputy Under Secretary of the Air Force for Space
4	Peter B. Teets	Peter B. Teets (1942–2020)	December 13, 2001	March 2005	~3 years, 92 days	
5	Gary Payton	Gary Payton (born 1948)	~March 2005	~August 2010	~5 years, 153 days	
6	Richard W. McKinney	Richard W. McKinney	August 2010	November 2013	~3 years, 92 days	
7	Troy E. Meink	Troy E. Meink	November 2013	June 2014	~212 days	
8	Winston A. Beauchamp	Winston A. Beauchamp	2015	~August 2017	~2 years, 61 days	
9	John P. Stopher	John P. Stopher	August 2017	April 2018	~243 days	
Principal Assistant to the Secretary of the Air Force for Space
9	John P. Stopher	John P. Stopher	April 2018	January 2019	~275 days	
-	Shawn J. Barnes	Shawn J. Barnes; Acting	January 2019	December 20, 2019	~339 days	
Assistant Secretary of the Air Force for Space Acquisition and Integration
-	Shawn J. Barnes	Shawn J. Barnes; Acting	December 20, 2019	August 24, 2021	1 year, 247 days	
-	Steven P. Whitney	Brigadier General; Steven P. Whitney (born 1970); Acting	August 24, 2021	May 5, 2022	254 days	
10	Frank Calvelli	Frank Calvelli	May 5, 2022	January 20, 2025	2 years, 260 days	
-	Stephen G. Purdy	Major General; Stephen G. Purdy (born 1971); Acting	January 20, 2025	January 22, 2026	1 year, 2 days	
-	Tom Ainsworth	Tom Ainsworth; Acting	January 22, 2026	August 24, 2026	214 days	
11	Erich Hernandez-Baquero	Erich Hernandez-Baquero	August 24, 2026	Incumbent	68 days	-

== List of military deputies to the assistant secretary ==
The military deputy to the assistant secretary of the air force for space acquisition and integration was formerly the director of space programs at the Office of the Assistant Secretary of the Air Force for Acquisition, Technology, and Logistics (SAF/AQ). The officeholder is responsible for helping the assistant secretary oversee research and development, test, production, product support and modernization of Space Force programs.

The post was renamed to the current title in August 2020 after Secretary of the Air Force Frank Kendall ordered the acceleration of separating space acquisition authority from SAF/AQ.

No.	Military Deputy		Term			Ref
No.	Portrait	Name	Took office	Left office	Duration	Ref
Director of Space Acquisition
-	Joseph B. Sovey	Major General; Joseph B. Sovey	April 2002	February 2004	~1 year, 306 days	
-	Craig R. Cooning	Major General; Craig R. Cooning	July 2004	~June 2007	~2 years, 335 days	
-	Neil McCasland	Major General; Neil McCasland	June 2007	June 2007	~2 years, 0 days	
-	Susan K. Mashiko	Major General; Susan K. Mashiko	July 2009	January 2010	~184 days	
-	John E. Hyten	Brigadier General; John E. Hyten	September 2009	February 2010	~153 days	
Director of Space Programs
-	John E. Hyten	Major General; John E. Hyten	September 2010	May 2012	~1 year, 243 days	
-	Robert McMurry	Major General; Robert McMurry	April 2012	May 2014	~2 years, 30 days	
-	Roger Teague	Major General; Roger Teague	May 2014	June 2017	~3 years, 31 days	
-	Mark Baird	Brigadier General; Mark Baird	June 2017	June 2018	~1 year, 0 days	
-	Nina Armagno	Major General; Nina Armagno (born 1966)	July 2018	August 2020	~2 years, 31 days	
-	Steven P. Whitney	Brigadier General; Steven P. Whitney (born 1970)	August 2020	August 24, 2021	~1 year, 9 days	
Military Deputy to the Assistant Secretary of the Air Force for Space Acquisition and Integration
1	Steven P. Whitney	Major General; Steven P. Whitney (born 1970)	August 24, 2021	July 2, 2023	1 year, 312 days	
2	Stephen G. Purdy	Major General; Stephen G. Purdy (born c. 1971)	July 2, 2023	February 20, 2026	2 years, 233 days	
3	Kristin Panzenhagen	Major General; Kristin Panzenhagen (born 1978)	February 20, 2026	Incumbent	253 days	
