= John E. Hyten =

11th vice chairman of the Joint Chiefs of Staff (born 1959)

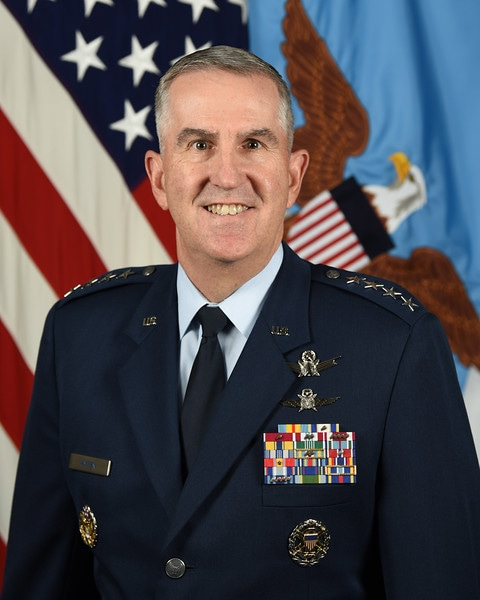
- Official portrait, 2021
- Born: July 18, 1959 (age 67); Torrance, California, U.S.
- Education: Harvard University (BS); Auburn University at Montgomery (MBA)
- Spouse: Laura Hyten
- Military career
- Allegiance: United States
- Branch: United States Air Force
- Service years: 1981–2021
- Rank: General
- Commands: Vice Chairman of the Joint Chiefs of Staff; United States Strategic Command; Air Force Space Command; 50th Space Wing; 595th Space Group; 6th Space Operations Squadron
- Conflicts: War in Afghanistan; Iraq War
- Awards: Defense Distinguished Service Medal (2); Air Force Distinguished Service Medal (2); Legion of Merit (2)

John Earl Hyten (born July 18, 1959) is a retired United States Air Force general who served as the 11th vice chairman of the Joint Chiefs of Staff from 2019 to 2021. A career space operations and acquisitions officer, he commanded the United States Strategic Command from 2016 to 2019 and the Air Force Space Command from 2014 to 2016.

Hyten was born in Torrance, California. After graduating from Harvard University, he received his commission into the U.S. Air Force in 1981. He started his military career in engineering jobs, then went into space and missile operations. He commanded the 6th Space Operations Squadron, 595th Space Group, and 50th Space Wing.

After retiring, Hyten joined Blue Origin as a strategic advisor.

== Early life and education ==
John Earl Hyten was born on July 18, 1959, in Torrance, California as the eldest of Sherwyn and Barbara Hyten's three children. In 1965, his family moved to Huntsville, Alabama, where his father worked on the Saturn V rocket. He grew up in Huntsville at the height of the Space Race, attending Chaffee Elementary School and Grissom High School, two of the three schools named after the Apollo 1 astronauts who died during a launch rehearsal test. In 1977, he graduated from Grissom High School. He wanted to become an astronaut, but because of his poor eyesight, decided to pursue engineering "to get in the space business."

Hyten got accepted into Harvard University, but unable to pay for it, he accepted an Air Force Reserve Officer Training Corps scholarship that required him to serve in the United States Air Force for four years. He graduated from Harvard in 1981 with a bachelor's degree in engineering and applied sciences. After graduating, he commissioned into the Air Force as a second lieutenant, intending to serve only for four years and get out in 1985 to work in the space industry.

In 1985, Hyten received a Master of Business Administration from Auburn University at Montgomery. He completed Squadron Officer School in 1985 as a distinguished graduate. From 1993 to 1994, he studied at the Air Command and Staff College in Maxwell Air Force Base, Alabama. In 1999, he became a national defense fellow of the University of Illinois. In 2011, he returned to Harvard, taking their Senior Managers in Government Course.

== Military career ==
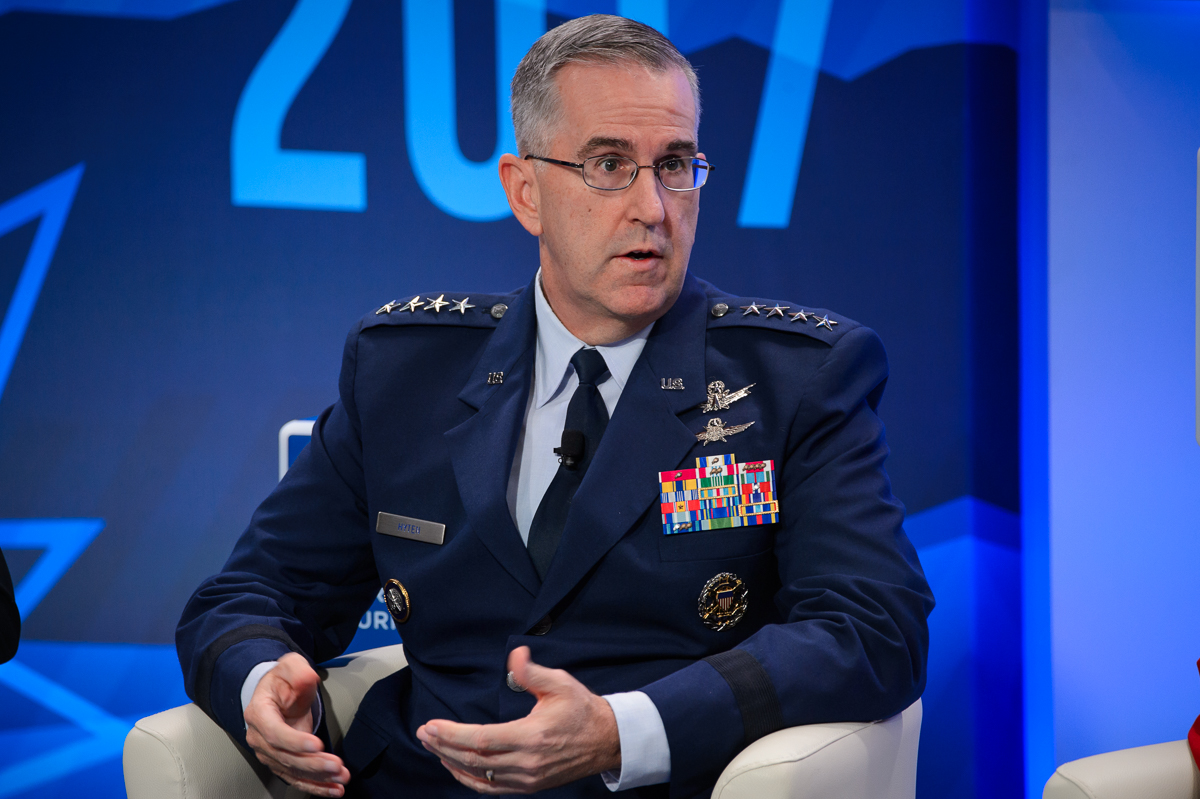
Hyten at the Halifax International Security Forum 2017

Hyten was commissioned into the United States Air Force on August 23, 1981, as a second lieutenant. From 1981 to 1985, he was assigned as a configuration management officer, later becoming chief of the Configuration Management Division, for the Automated Systems Program Office at Gunter Air Force Base, Alabama. He then was reassigned to Los Angeles Air Force Base, California, from 1985 to 1989 as chief of the Software Development Branch and, thereafter, as chief of the Engineering and Acquisition Division of the Space Defense Programs Office.

Hyten then returned to Alabama for a year to serve as a special adviser to the U.S. Army's Kinetic Energy Anti-Satellite Program Office. In 1990, he went back to Los Angeles as deputy for engineering at the Strategic Defense Initiatives Program Office. From 1991 to 1993, he was assigned to the Pentagon first as an executive speechwriter and systems analyst and then as program element monitor for Advanced Technology Programs for the Assistant Secretary of the Air Force (Acquisition).

In 1994, after attending the Air Command and Staff College, Hyten was assigned to the United States Space Command at Cheyenne Mountain Air Force Station, Colorado, as mission director, space operations officer, and chief of command center training. From 1996 to 1998, he commanded the 6th Space Operations Squadron at Offutt Air Force Base, Nebraska. After that command tour, he was selected as a national defense fellow at the University of Illinois.

Hyten was sent back to the Pentagon in 1999 to serve multiple roles at the Joint Staff. From 2001 to 2003, he served as chief of the Space Control Division, Directorate for Space Operations and Integration, Deputy Chief of Staff for Air and Space Operations. After that, he served as director of the commander's action group for the commander of Air Force Space Command, General Lance W. Lord.

In July 2004, Hyten took command of the 595th Space Group. In April 2005, he took command of the 50th Space Wing. While serving as wing commander, he was deployed to Southwest Asia as director of space forces of the U.S. Central Command Air Forces from May to October 2006. He relinquished command of the wing in May 2007, after which he was assigned as director of requirements of AFSPC.

While serving at AFSPC, Hyten was promoted to brigadier general on October 1, 2007. From 2009 to 2012, he was assigned at the Pentagon. He first served as director of cyber and space operations, Deputy Chief of Staff for Operations, Plans and Requirements from 2009 to 2010. In 2010, he was assigned as director of space acquisition at the Office of the Under Secretary of the Air Force, during which time the position was transferred as director of space programs at the Office of the Assistant Secretary of the Air Force for Acquisition.

In May 2012, Hyten was assigned as vice commander of AFSPC. After this, he commanded AFSPC from August 2014 to October 2016.

His career includes assignments in a variety of space acquisition and operations positions. He served in senior engineering positions on both Air Force and Army anti-satellite weapon system programs. He initially wanted to serve for four years but decided to stay after getting the opportunity to work in the space and missile defense program.

Hyten's staff assignments include tours with the Air Force Secretariat, the Air Staff, the Joint Staff and the Commander's Action Group at Headquarters Air Force Space Command as Director. He served as mission director in Cheyenne Mountain and was the last active-duty commander of the 6th Space Operations Squadron at Offutt Air Force Base, Nebraska. In 2006, he deployed to Southwest Asia as Director of Space Forces for operations Enduring Freedom and Iraqi Freedom. Hyten commanded the 595th Space Group and the 50th Space Wing at Schriever Air Force Base, Colo. Prior to assuming command of Air Force Space Command, he served as the Vice Commander, Air Force Space Command.

On March 15, 2013, it was announced that Hyten had been nominated to be Commander, Fourteenth Air Force and Joint Functional Component Command for Space, U.S. Strategic Command. This would have had him exchanging jobs with the incumbent Lieutenant General Susan J. Helms. However, Helms' nomination was put on hold by Missouri Senator Claire McCaskill resulting in the withdrawal of the nomination and leading to the retirement of Helms. On April 9, 2014, Hyten was confirmed by the Senate for promotion to the rank of General and appointment as Commander, Air Force Space Command. Before assuming command of the United States Strategic Command on November 3, 2016, Hyten commanded Air Force Space Command.

=== United States Strategic Command ===
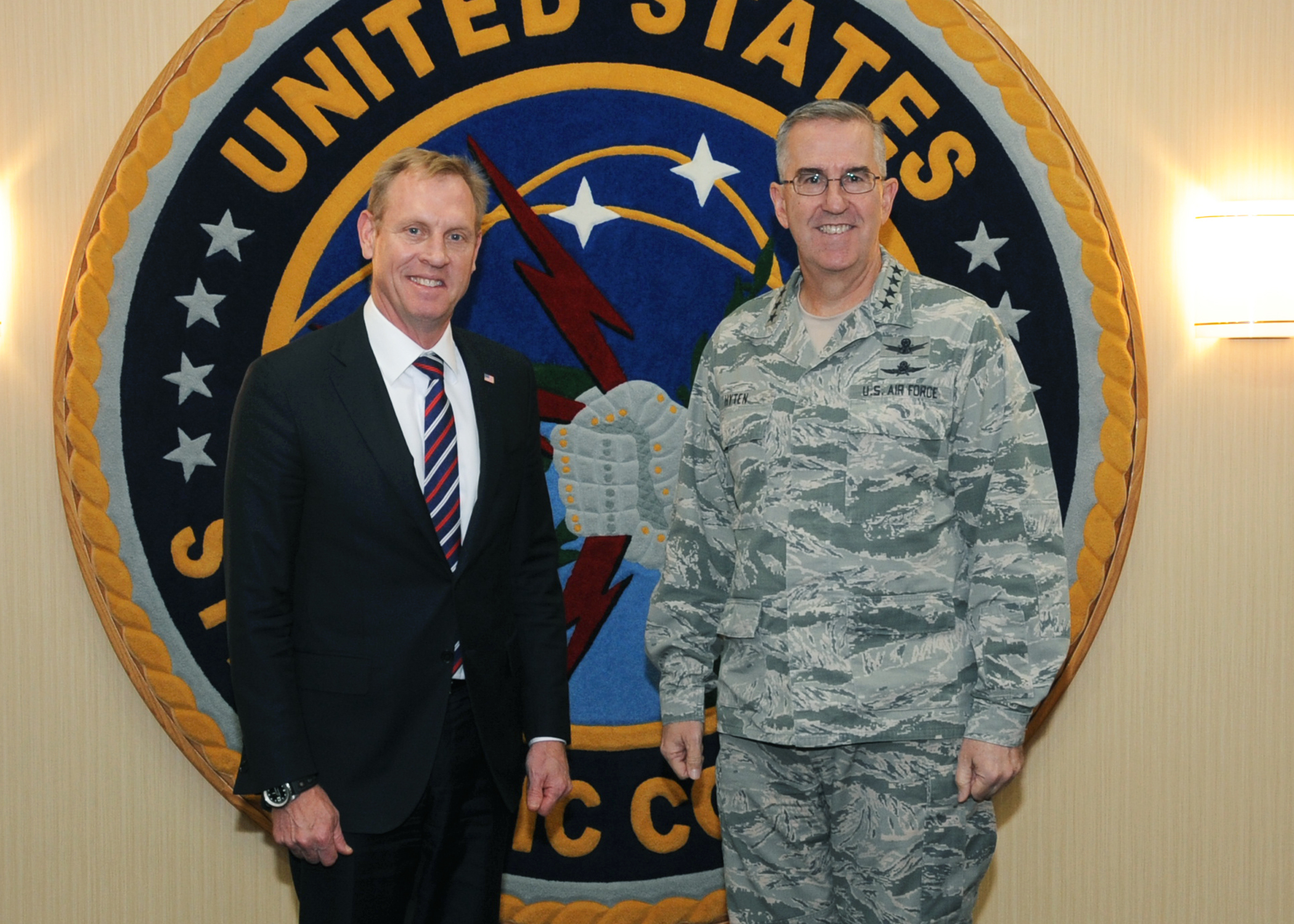
Hyten, commander of the United States Strategic Command, poses for a photo with Deputy Secretary of Defense Patrick M. Shanahan on April 19, 2018.

Hyten was nominated for reassignment to head the United States Strategic Command on September 8, 2016. This nomination was confirmed by the U.S. Senate on September 28, 2016 after a confirmation hearing before the Senate Committee on Armed Services on September 20. The change of command ceremony occurred on November 3.

In November 2017, Hyten stated that if he determines Donald Trump's order for a nuclear strike to be illegal, then "I'm going to say: 'Mr President, that's illegal.' And guess what he's going to do? He's going to say, 'What would be legal?' And we'll come up with options, of a mix of capabilities to respond to whatever the situation is, and that's the way it works."

Hyten has been a strong proponent for developing advanced hypersonic weapons, saying they would enable "responsive, long-range, strike options against distant, defended, and/or time-critical threats [such as road-mobile missiles] when other forces are unavailable, denied access, or not preferred.”

=== Vice Chairman of the Joint Chiefs of Staff ===
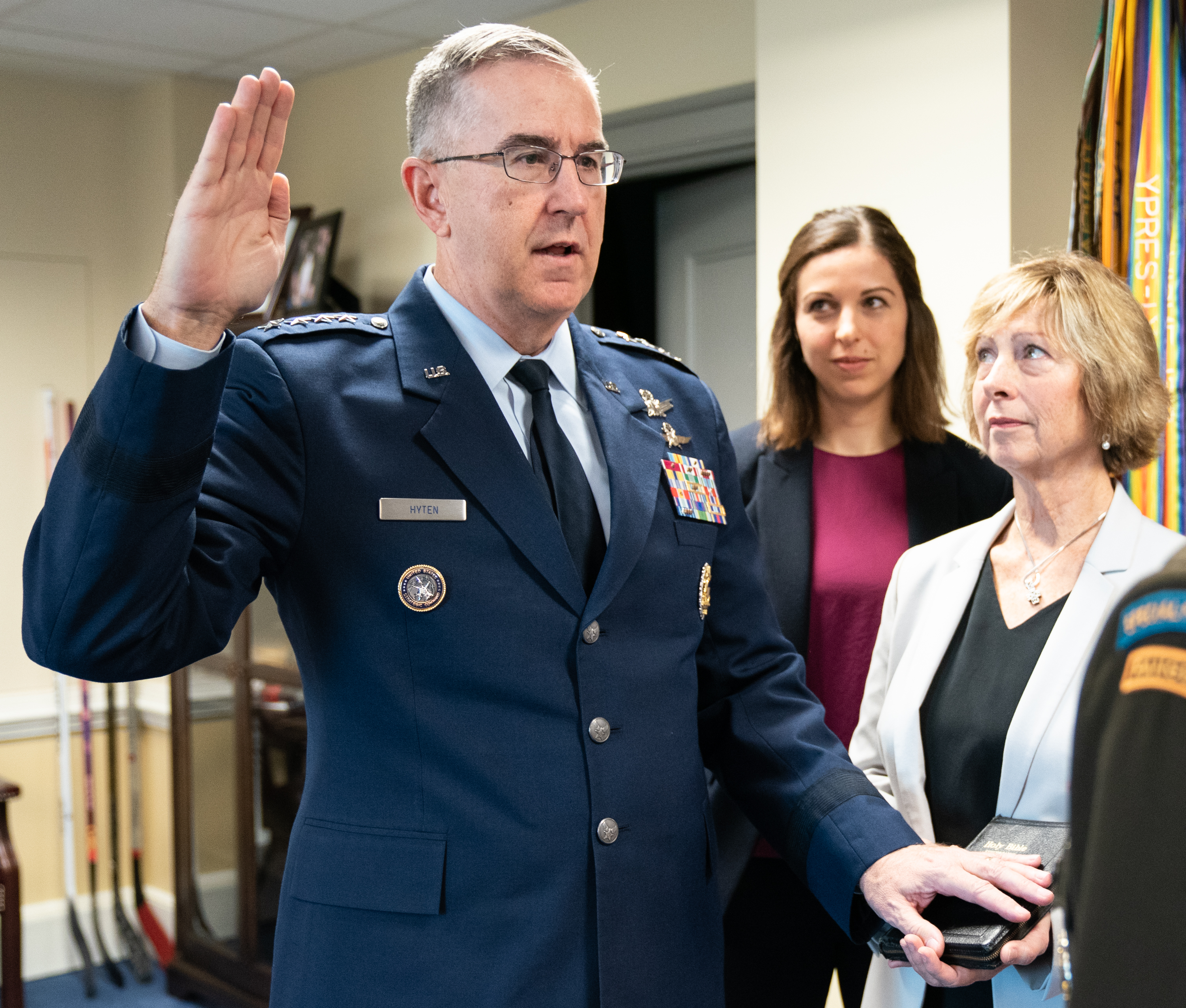
Hyten is sworn in as Vice Chairman of the Joint Chiefs of Staff on November 18, 2019.

In April 2019, Hyten was nominated to be Vice Chairman of the Joint Chiefs of Staff. The U.S. Senate confirmed him on September 26, 2019, by a vote of 75–22. He assumed duties as the Vice Chairman on November 21, 2019, making him the second highest-ranking military officer in the U.S. Armed Forces. From February 2, 2019, Hyten also served as the senior designated official of the Electromagnetic Spectrum Operations Cross Functional Team.

Hyten has stated that he hopes to reduce overclassification in the Department of Defense.

It was announced that by the year of 2021 Hyten is expected to retire and would not seek a second-term as vice chairman of the Joint Chiefs of Staff. With the absence of a selected nominee to succeed Hyten, Department of Defense officials stated in October 2021 that Hyten would delegate his duties to senior officials on the Joint Staff if a nominee was not confirmed by his retirement date in November. U.S. Navy Adm. Christopher Grady succeeded Hyten as vice chairman of the Joint Chiefs of Staff upon the confirmation of his nomination to the post by the U.S. Senate on December 16, 2021.

Hyten retired from active duty on November 19, 2021.

=== Sexual misconduct allegation ===
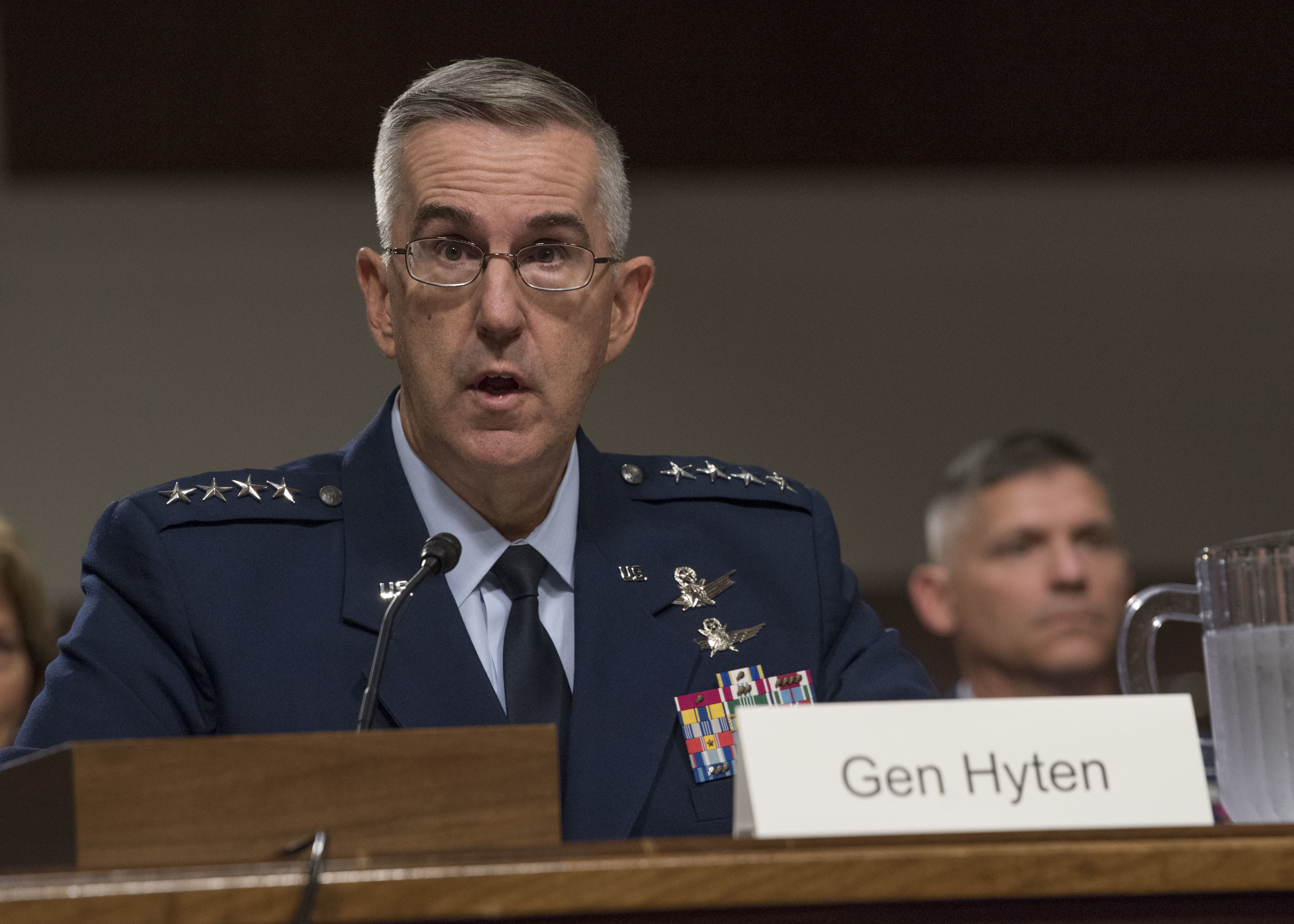
General Hyten testifies at his Senate nomination hearing to be vice chairman of the Joint Chiefs of Staff, July 30, 2019.

In July 2019, an unnamed senior military officer spoke to the Associated Press accusing Hyten of sexual misconduct in 2017 while she was one of his aides. The officer claimed that Hyten subjected her to unwanted kissing and touching during the 2017 Reagan National Defense Forum in California and several times during the year she was while working as his aide. The officer said, "My life was ruined by this".

The Air Force Office of Special Investigations opened an investigation, which included interviews with 53 witnesses and a review of tens of thousands of emails. The investigation found no evidence or information to substantiate the allegations. The court martial convening authority, General Mike Holmes, declined to take any action given the lack of supporting evidence concerning the allegations. The Secretary of the Air Force who initiated the investigation also concluded that General Hyten had been falsely accused.

The accuser identified herself as Colonel Kathryn A. Spletstoser, former director, Commander's Action Group, United States Strategic Command, on July 26, 2019.

On July 30, Hyten appeared before the Senate Armed Services Committee for his confirmation hearing for Vice Chairman of the Joint Chiefs, following five closed-door sessions. No members of the committee supported the accusations in the public hearing, with Senator Martha McSally stating that "sexual assault happens in the military. It just didn't happen in this case" and that "the full truth was revealed in this process... General Hyten is innocent of these charges." In July 2023, Spletstoser reached a settlement with the federal government in U.S. District Court in California for $975,000.

==== Settlement and legal significance ====
In July 2023, the United States government agreed to pay $975,000 to settle a civil lawsuit brought by retired Army Colonel Kathryn Spletstoser against General Hyten, who was accused of sexual assault and battery.

The case, Spletstoser v. Hyten, included state-law claims of sexual battery, assault, intentional infliction of emotional distress, and gender-based violence. Ariel E. Solomon of Solomon Law Firm represented Spletstoser in the litigation.

Legal analysts noted that the Ninth Circuit’s earlier decision allowing the lawsuit to proceed represented a rare instance in which a service-member’s sexual-assault claim was not barred by precedent in Feres v. United States. Commentary in The 19th News likewise described the case as part of a growing effort by military-sexual-assault survivors to obtain justice through civilian courts rather than the military system.

== Civilian career ==
On June 15, 2022, Blue Origin announced that Hyten will join the company as strategic advisor and executive director for Club for Future and . In March 2023, he was appointed as special advisor to Thomas Siebel, the chief executive officer of C3.ai, after joining the company's advisory board in June 2022.

== Personal life ==
Hyten is married to Laura Hyten.

== Awards and decorations ==
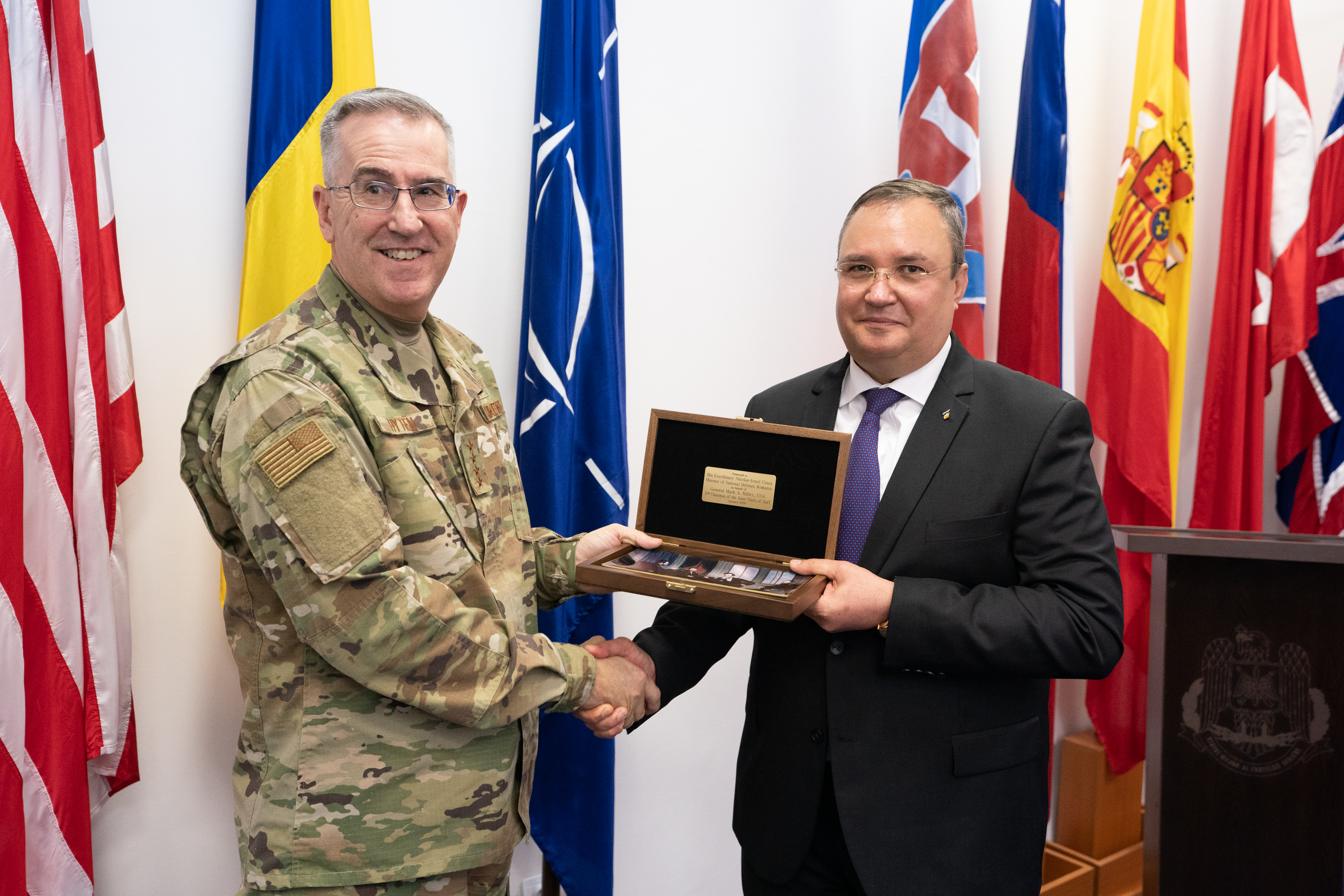
General Hyten presents a gift to Romanian Minister of National Defense Nicolae Ciucă during a visit to Mihail Kognalniceanu Air Base, January 7, 2020.

Hyten is the recipient of the following awards:

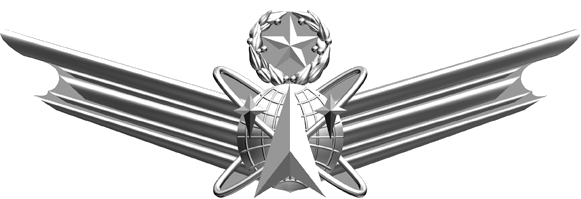
Command Space Operations Badge
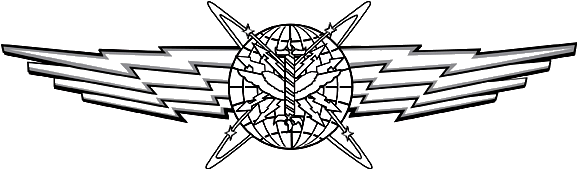
Basic Cyberspace Operator Badge

Office of the Joint Chiefs of Staff Identification Badge

Air Staff Badge

Defense Distinguished Service Medal with one bronze oak leaf cluster
Air Force Distinguished Service Medal with one bronze oak leaf cluster
Legion of Merit with one bronze oak leaf cluster
Defense Meritorious Service Medal with two bronze oak leaf clusters
Meritorious Service Medal with four bronze oak leaf clusters
Army Commendation Medal
Air Force Commendation Medal
Joint Service Achievement Medal
Air Force Achievement Medal
Joint Meritorious Unit Award with two bronze oak leaf clusters
Air Force Organizational Excellence Award with one silver oak leaf cluster
National Defense Service Medal with one bronze service star
Global War on Terrorism Expeditionary Medal
Global War on Terrorism Service Medal
Air and Space Campaign Medal
Nuclear Deterrence Operations Service Medal
Air Force Expeditionary Service Ribbon with gold frame
Air Force Longevity Service Award with one silver and three bronze oak leaf clusters
Small Arms Expert Marksmanship Ribbon
Air Force Training Ribbon

=== Other achievements ===
- 1991 Recipient of the William Jump Award for Excellence within the Federal Government
- 1998 Recipient of a Laurels Award, Aviation Week & Space Technology Magazine
- 2009 Gen. Jerome F. O'Malley Distinguished Space Leadership Award
- 2014 Dr. Wernher Von Braun Space Flight Trophy
- 2014 General Thomas D. White Space Award
- 2018 Dr. Robert H. Goddard Memorial Trophy

== Promotions ==
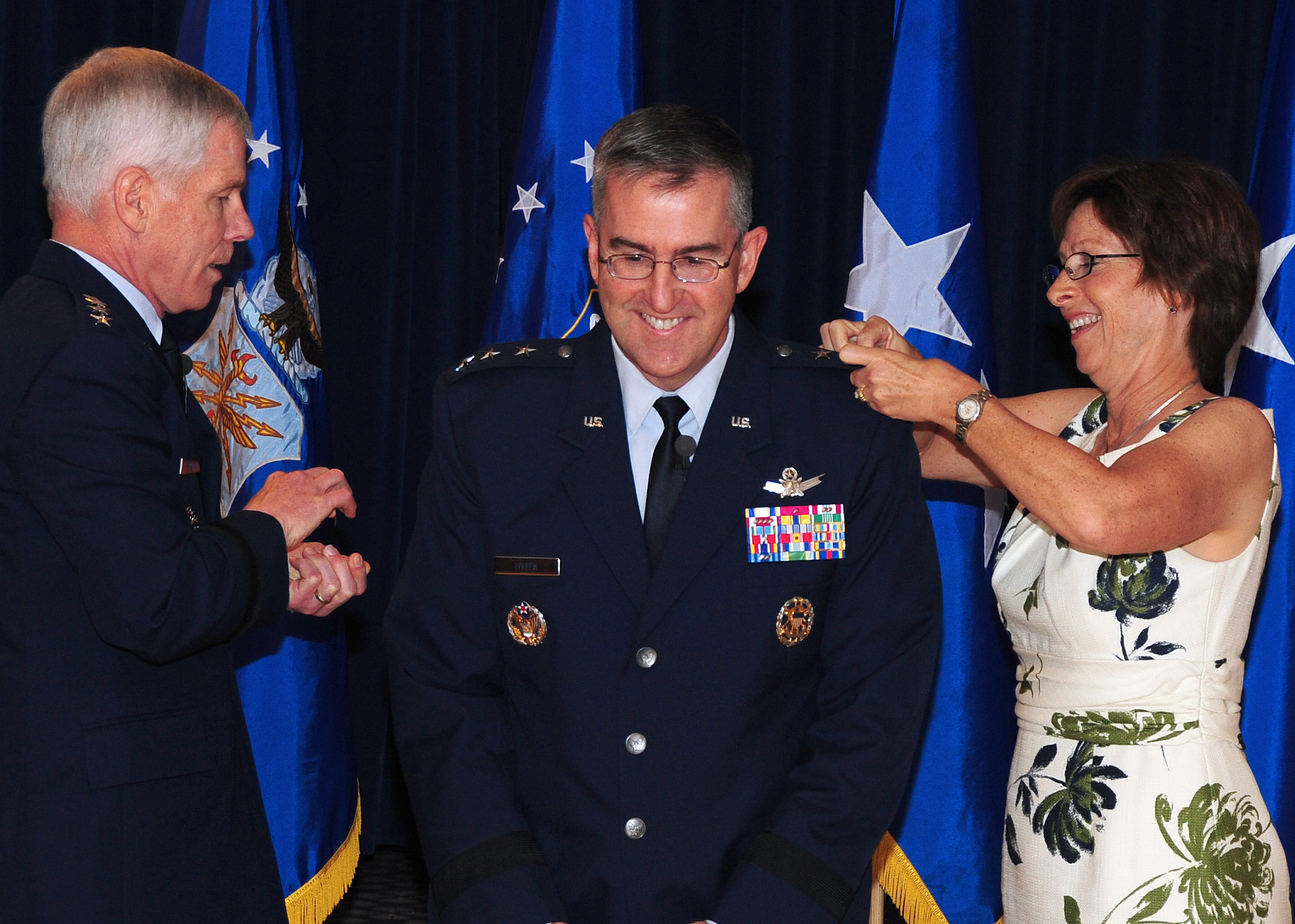
Hyten is pinned with the rank of lieutenant general by his wife Laura and General William L. Shelton, the outgoing AFSPC commander on May 18, 2012.

Promotions
Insignia	Rank	Date
	General	August 15, 2014
	Lieutenant General	May 18, 2012
	Major General	November 10, 2010
	Brigadier General	October 1, 2007
	Colonel	June 1, 2002
	Lieutenant Colonel	January 1, 1997
	Major	May 1, 1993
	Captain	August 23, 1985
	First Lieutenant	August 23, 1983
	Second Lieutenant	August 23, 1981

== Writings ==
- "Space Mission Force:Developing Space Warfighters of Tomorrow" (PDF). Air Force Space Command. June 29, 2016. Archived (PDF) from the original on January 5, 2022.
- With Dr. Robert Uy (Summer 2004). "Moral and Ethical Decisions Regarding Space Warfare" (PDF). Air and Space Power Journal. XVIII (2): 51–60.
- "A Sea of Peace or a Theater of War: Dealing with the Inevitable Conflict in Space" (PDF). Air and Space Power Journal. XVI (3): 78–92. Fall 2002.

Military offices
Preceded by Susan K. Mashiko	Director for Space Programs of the Office of the Assistant Secretary for Acquisition; 2010–2012	Succeeded by Robert McMurry
Preceded by Michael J. Basla	Vice Commander of the Air Force Space Command; 2012‒2014	Succeeded by David J. Buck
Preceded by William L. Shelton	Commander of the Air Force Space Command; 2014–2016	Succeeded by John W. Raymond
Preceded by Cecil D. Haney	Commander of the United States Strategic Command; 2016–2019	Succeeded by Charles A. Richard
Preceded by Paul J. Selva	Vice Chairman of the Joint Chiefs of Staff; 2019–2021	Succeeded by Christopher W. Grady
