= Steven P. Whitney =

U.S. Space Force general

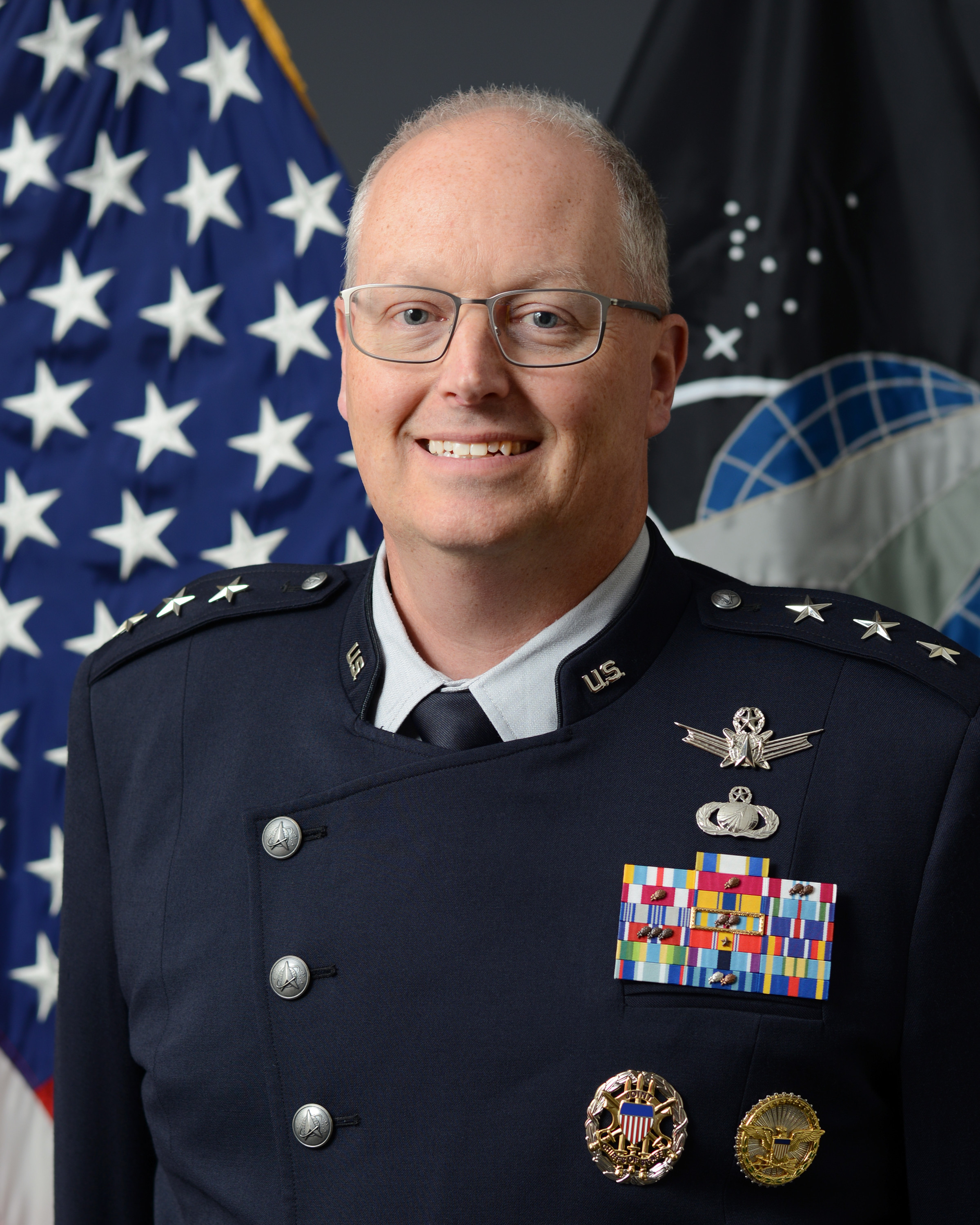
- Official portrait, 2025
- Born: 1970 (age 55–56); Edina, Minnesota, U.S.
- Alma mater: University of Minnesota (BS): George Washington University (MA)
- Relatives: Divorce
- Military career
- Allegiance: United States
- Branch: United States Air Force: United States Space Force
- Service years: 1993–2021 (Air Force): 2021–present (Space Force)
- Rank: Lieutenant General
- Commands: Production Corps, SSC: Global Positioning Systems Directorate; Global Positioning System User Equipment Division; Enterprise Operations Squadron, NRO
- Awards: Air Force Distinguished Service Medal: Defense Superior Service Medal; Legion of Merit (2)

Steven Patrick Whitney (born 1970) is a United States Space Force lieutenant general who serves as the director of force structure, resources, and assessment of the Joint Staff. He previously served as the director of staff of the United States Space Force.

Whitney graduated in 1992 from the University of Minnesota with a B.S. degree in electrical engineering. He entered the United States Air Force as a distinguished graduate of the university's Air Force Reserve Officer Training Corps program. He is a career space acquisitions officer who commanded the National Reconnaissance Office's Enterprise Operations Squadron. He has experience working on Global Positioning System (GPS) acquisition, serving as director of the Global Positioning Systems Directorate and senior materiel leader for the GPS User Equipment Division. He has also served as program executive officer for space production at the Space and Missile Systems Center.

In May 2021, he transferred into the Space Force and he was promoted to major general a year later. As director of staff, he is responsible for synchronizing policy, plans, positions, procedures, and cross-functional issues for the Space Force's headquarters staff. He is the first two-star director general of the Space Force after the position was downgraded from a three-star billet.

== Education ==
- 1992 Bachelors of Electrical Engineering, University of Minnesota, Minneapolis
- 1997 Squadron Officer School, Distinguished Graduate, Maxwell Air Force Base, Ala.
- 2000 Master of Arts, Administrative Sciences, The George Washington University, Washington, D.C.
- 2004 Air Command and Staff College, Maxwell AFB, Ala., by correspondence
- 2005 Master of Science, Systems Engineering, Distinguished Graduate, Air Force Institute of Technology, Wright-Patterson AFB, Ohio
- 2007 Air War College, Maxwell AFB, Ala., by correspondence
- 2011 Master of Science, National Security Strategy, Fort Lesley J. McNair, Washington, D.C.
- 2013 Program Managers Course, Defense Acquisition University, Fort Belvoir, Va.
- 2014 Executive Program Managers Course, Defense Acquisition University, Fort Belvoir, Va.

== Military career ==
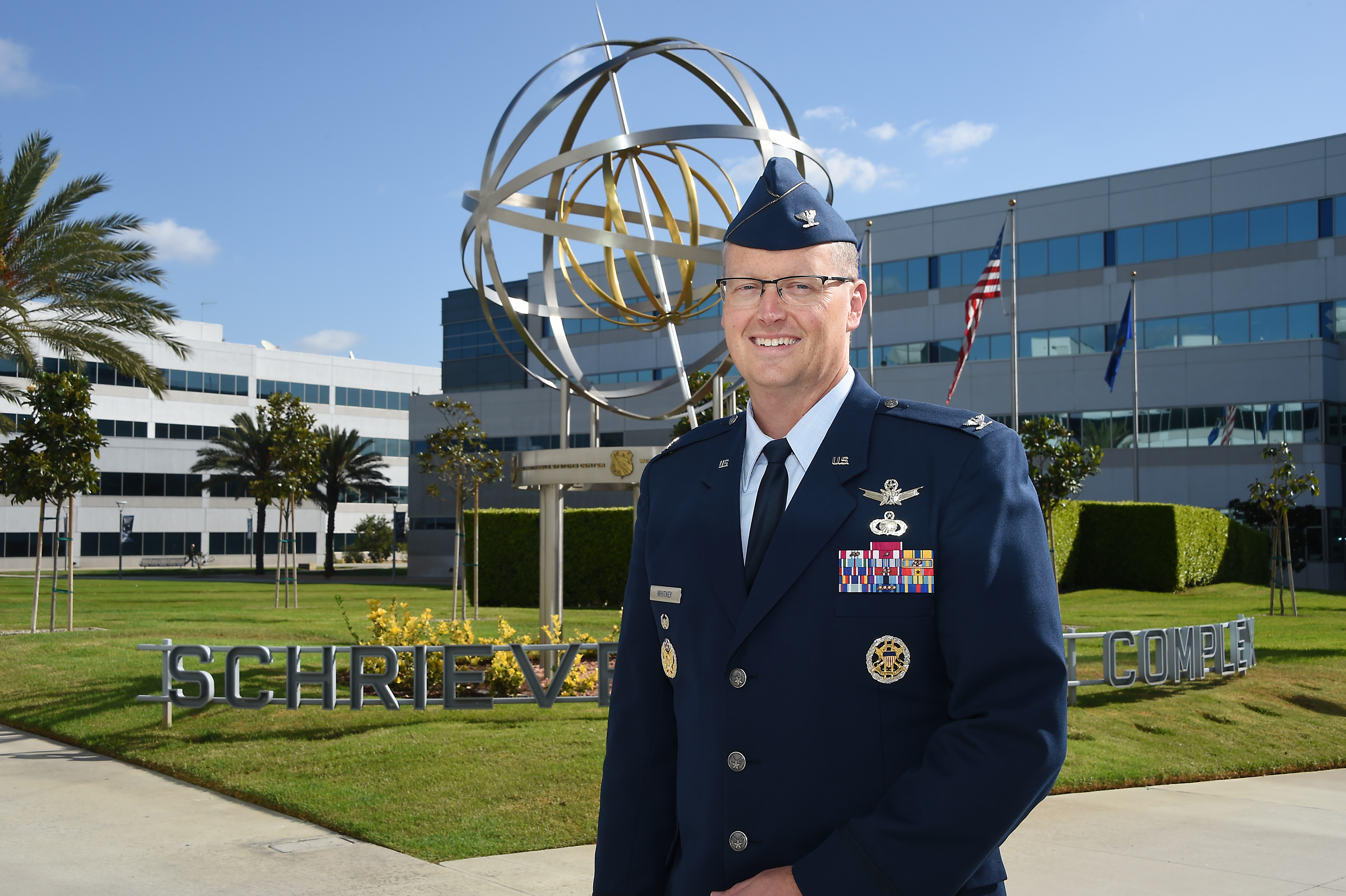
Whitney in 2017

In September 2022, Whitney was nominated for promotion to major general.

== Assignments ==
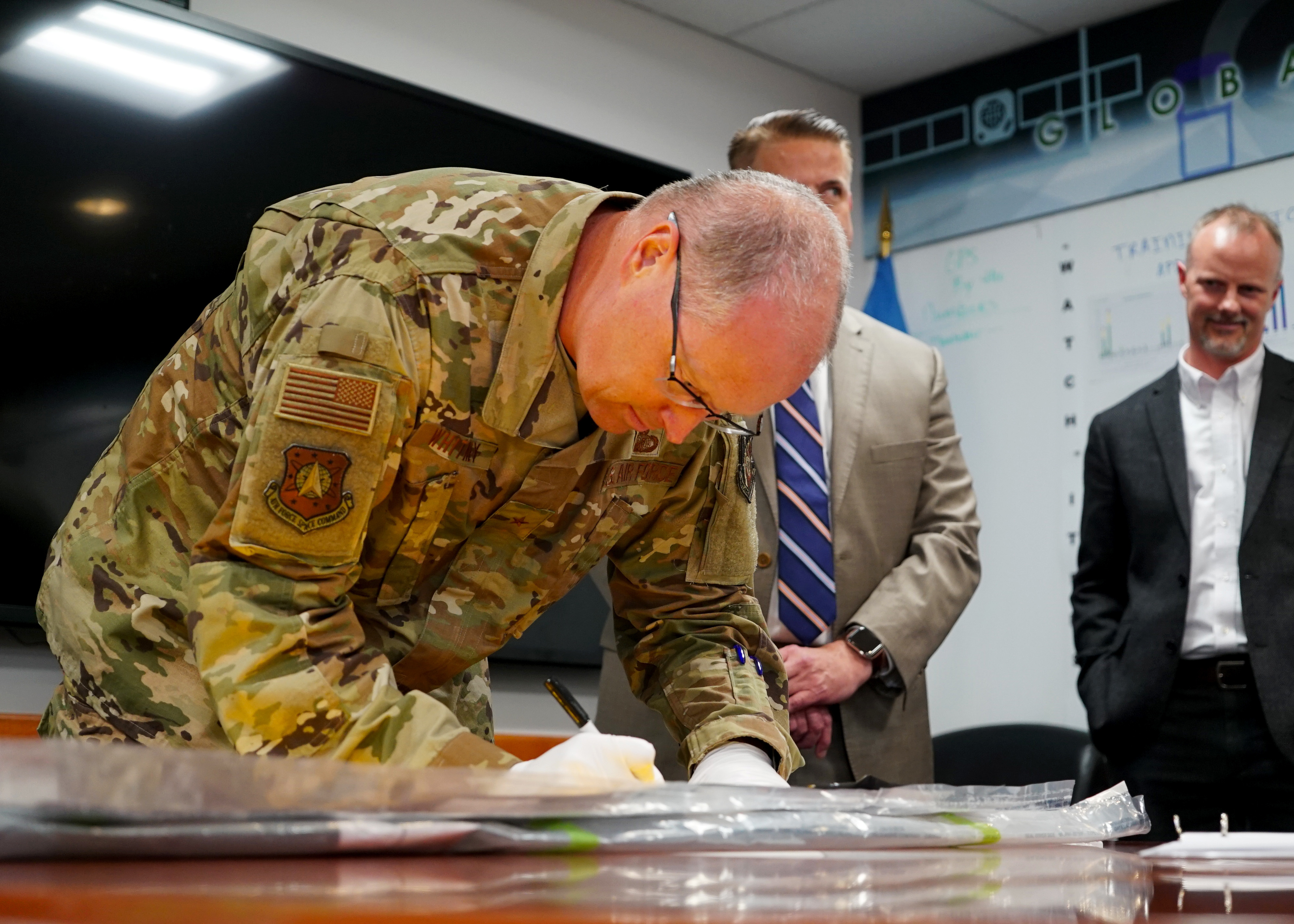
Whitney writes a message on the “thermal space blanket” for the Advanced Extremely High Frequency–5 (AEHF-5) satellite, 2019

1. April 1993–July 1996, Defense Support Program & Defense Meteorological Satellite Program Crew Commander and Chief, DSP Spacecraft Engineering; 1st Space Operations Squadron, Schriever Air Force Base, Colo.
2. July 1996–June 1998, Chief, Commanders Action Group and FDS Operations Manager; Space-Based Infrared System Program Office, Los Angeles AFB, Calif.
3. June 1998–June 2000, Air Force Intern, Directorate of Space and Nuclear Deterrence, Office of the Secretary of the Air Force and Force Management Policy, Office of the Secretary of Defense, the Pentagon, Arlington, Va.
4. June 2000–May 2004, Senior Flight Commander; Chief, Production Division and director of Engineering, Air Force Communications Support Facility, White Sands Missile Range, Las Cruces, N.M.
5. May 2004–June 2005, Student, Air Force Institute of Technology; Wright-Patterson AFB, Ohio
6. June 2005–May 2008, MILSATCOM Program Element Monitor and Chief, Congressional & Media Affairs, Space Acquisition Directorate, Office of the Under Secretary of the Air Force, the Pentagon, Arlington, Va.
7. June 2008–July 2010, Commander, Enterprise Operations Squadron, Mission Operations Directorate, National Reconnaissance Office, Chantilly, Va.
8. August 2010–June 2011, Student, National War College, Fort Lesley J. McNair, Washington, D.C.
9. June 2011–July 2013, Chief, Space/C4 Branch and Space Lead, Joint Chiefs of Staff (J8), the Pentagon, Arlington, Va.
10. July 2013–July 2015, Senior Materiel Leader, Global Positioning System User Equipment Division, Global Positioning Systems Directorate, Space and Missile Systems Center, Los Angeles AFB, Calif.
11. July 2015–June 2019, Director, Global Positioning Systems Directorate, Space and Missile Systems Center, Los Angeles AFB, Calif.
12. October 2018–June 2019, Program Executive Officer for Space Production, Space and Missile Systems Center, Los Angeles AFB, Calif.
13. July 2019–July 2020, Deputy to the Assistant Secretary of Defense for Sustainment, Office of the Under Secretary of Defense for Acquisition and Sustainment, the Pentagon, Arlington, Va.
14. August 2020–August 2021, Director, Space Programs, Office of the Assistant Secretary of the Air Force for Acquisition, Headquarters U.S. Air Force, the Pentagon, Arlington, Va.
15. August 2021–June 2023, Military Deputy, Office of the Assistant Secretary of the Air Force for Space Acquisition and Integration, Headquarters U.S. Air Force, the Pentagon, Arlington, Va.
16. July 2023 – Oct 2025, Director of Staff, Headquarters, U.S. Space Force, Washington, DC
17. Oct 2025 – present, Director, Force Structure, Resources and Assessment, Joint Staff J8, Pentagon, Washington DC

== Awards and decorations ==
Whitney is the recipient of the following awards:

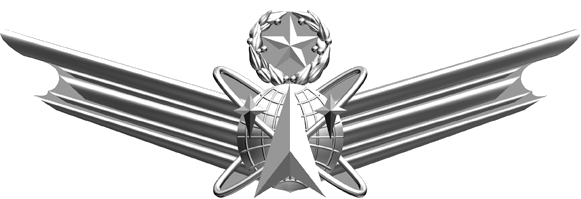
Command Space Operations Badge

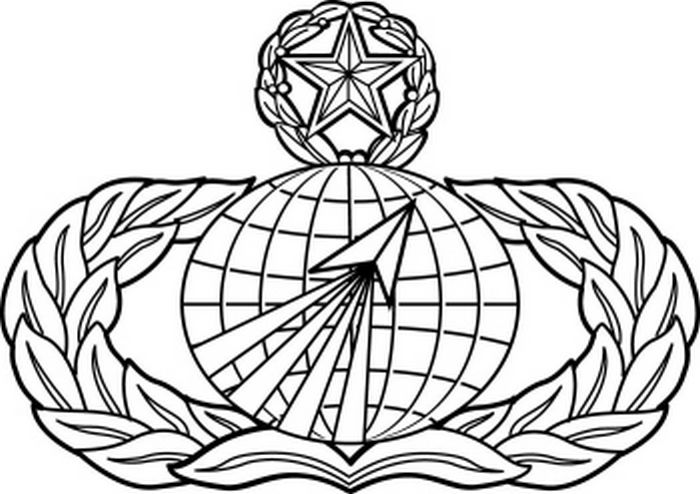

Air Force Master Acquisition and Financial Management Badge

Office of the Secretary of Defense Badge

Office of the Joint Chiefs of Staff Identification Badge

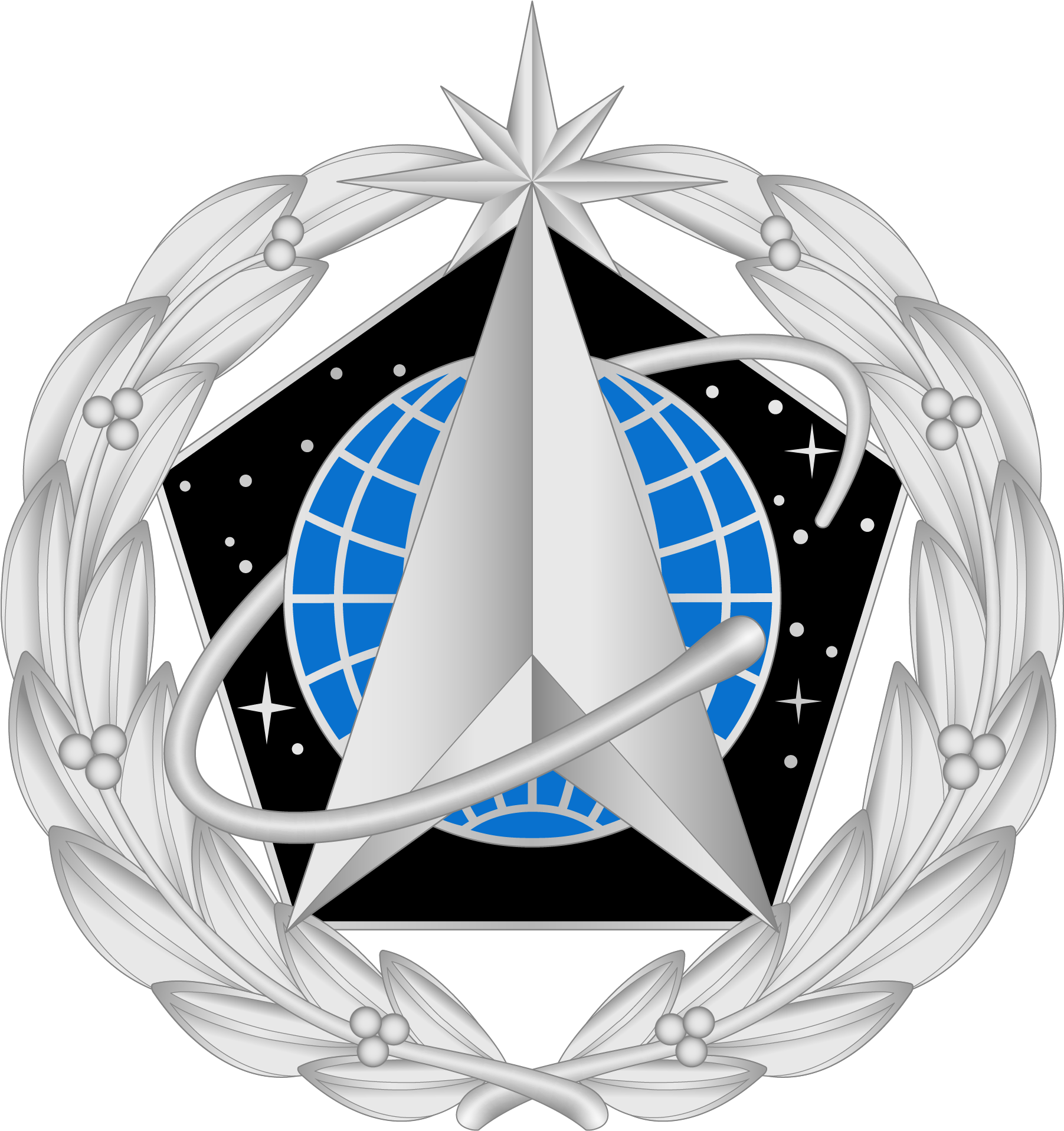

Space Staff Badge

| Air Force Distinguished Service Medal |
| Defense Superior Service Medal |
| Legion of Merit with one bronze oak leaf cluster |
| Defense Meritorious Service Medal with two bronze oak leaf clusters |
| Meritorious Service Medal with one bronze oak leaf cluster |
| Air Force Commendation Medal |
| Joint Service Achievement Medal |
| Air Force Achievement Medal |
| Joint Meritorious Unit Award with two bronze oak leaf clusters |
| Air Force Outstanding Unit Award |
| Air Force Organizational Excellence Award with three bronze oak leaf clusters |
| National Defense Service Medal with one bronze service star |
| Global War on Terrorism Service Medal |
| Armed Forces Service Medal |
| Humanitarian Service Medal |
| Outstanding Volunteer Service Medal |
| Air and Space Campaign Medal |
| Air Force Longevity Service Award with one silver and one bronze oak leaf cluster |
| Air Force Training Ribbon |

== Dates of promotions ==
| Rank | Branch | Date |
|---|---|---|
| Second Lieutenant | Air Force | February 17, 1993 |
| First Lieutenant | Air Force | February 17, 1995 |
| Captain | Air Force | February 17, 1997 |
| Major | Air Force | June 1, 2003 |
| Lieutenant Colonel | Air Force | September 1, 2007 |
| Colonel | Air Force | June 1, 2012 |
| Brigadier General | Air Force | April 2, 2019 |
| Brigadier General | Space Force | May 4, 2021 |
| Major General | Space Force | September 29, 2022 |
| Lieutenant General | Space Force | October 30, 2025 |

== Writings ==
- With Theresa A. Jamison, Brice T. Niska, and Phillip A. Layman (June 2005). Evaluation of Enterprise Architecture Interoperability (PDF) (M.S.). Air Force Institute of Technology. Archived (PDF) from the original on November 1, 2021.

Military offices
| Preceded by William T. Cooley | Director of the Global Positioning Systems Directorate; 2015–2019 | Directorate inactivated |
| New office | Program Executive Officer for Space Production of the Space and Missile Systems Center; 2018–2019 | Succeeded by Cordell A. Delapena Jr. |
| New office | Deputy to the Assistant Secretary of Defense for Sustainment; 2019–2020 | Succeeded by Matthew N. Ott III |
| Preceded by Nina Armagno | Director of Space Programs of the Office of the Assistant Secretary of the Air Force for Acquisition; 2020–2021 | Succeeded by Eric Nelson |
| Preceded by Shawn J. Barnes; Acting | Assistant Secretary of the Air Force for Space Acquisition and Integration; Acting; 2021–2022 | Succeeded by Frank Calvelli |
| New office | Military Deputy to the Assistant Secretary of the Air Force for Space Acquisition and Integration; 2021–2023 | Succeeded by Stephen G. Purdy |
| Preceded by Nina Armagno | Director of Staff of the United States Space Force; 2023–2025 | Vacant |
| Preceded by Sara A. Joyner | Director of Force Structure, Resources, and Assessment of the Joint Staff; 2025–present | Incumbent |
