= Clinton Crosier =

United States Air Force general

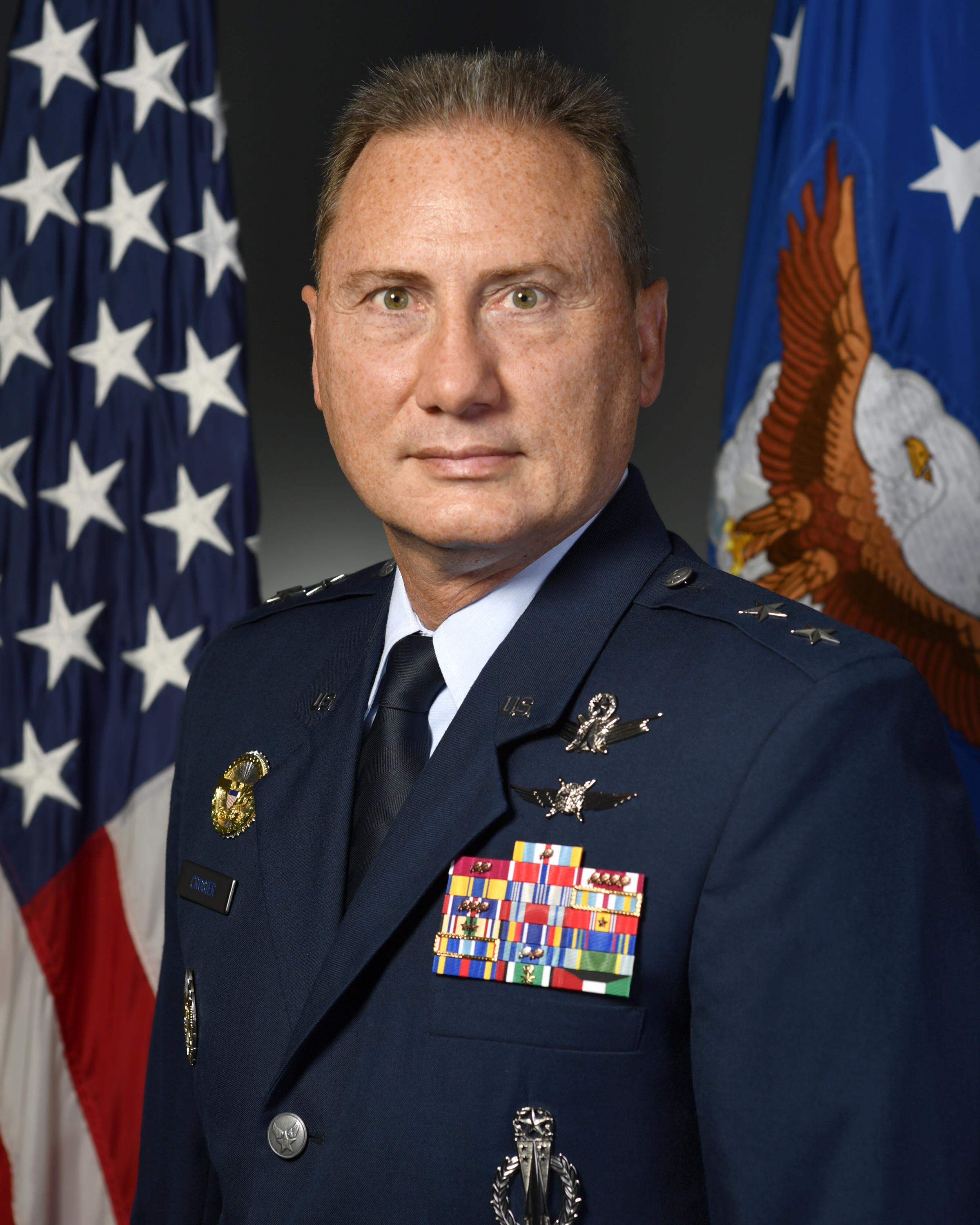
- Official portrait, 2015
- Born: Clinton E. Crosier
- Military career
- Allegiance: United States
- Branch: United States Air Force
- Service years: 1987–2020 (33 years)
- Rank: Major general
- Commands: 460th Space Wing; 50th Operations Group; 2nd Space Launch Squadron
- Awards: Defense Superior Service Medal (2); Legion of Merit (3)

Clinton E. Crosier is a retired United States Air Force major general who last served as director of space force planning in the Office of the Chief of Space Operations. After retiring, he was hired to lead Amazon Web Services' new Aerospace and Satellite Solutions.

Crosier attended Iowa State University on an Air Force ROTC scholarship. He was commissioned and entered the Air Force in 1988 after receiving a degree in aerospace engineering.

In 2020 Crosier led the Air Force team responsible for detailed planning for the creation of the United States Space Force.

== Assignments ==
- January 1988–September 1991, operations management officer and squadron section commander, 7th Airborne Command and Control Squadron, Keesler Air Force Base, Mississippi
- September 1991–February 1992, student, Undergraduate Space Training, Lowry AFB, Colorado
- February 1992–February 1995, chief of operations plans and requirements, deputy chief of standardization and evaluations, flight commander, instructor, 3rd Space Operations Squadron, Falcon AFB, Colorado
- February 1995–July 1995, student, Intercontinental Ballistic Missile Initial Qualification Training, Vandenberg AFB, California
- July 1995–September 1997, operations support flight commander, instructor, crew commander, 320th Missile Squadron, F.E. Warren AFB, Wyoming
- September 1997–July 1998, chief of current operations and training, 90th Operations Support Squadron, F.E. Warren AFB, Wyoming
- July 1998–January 1999, Congressional liaison officer, Headquarters Air Force, Office of Legislative Liaison, the Pentagon, Arlington, Virginia
- January 1999–January 2000, legislative fellow, U.S. Senate, Washington, D.C.
- January 2000–July 2001, space and missile advisor, Secretary of the Air Force Action Group, Office of the Secretary of the Air Force, the Pentagon, Arlington, Virginia
- July 2001–July 2003, commander, 2d Space Launch Squadron, Vandenberg AFB, California
- July 2003–June 2004, student, Naval War College, Newport, Rhode Island
- June 2004–May 2006, director of preparation and planning, Under Secretary of Defense for Intelligence, Office of the Secretary of Defense, the Pentagon, Arlington, Virginia
- June 2006–July 2008, commander, 50th Operations Group, Schriever AFB, Colorado
- July 2008–June 2009, deputy director of plans and programs, Headquarters, Air Force Space Command, Peterson AFB, Colorado
- June 2009–May 2011, commander, 460th Space Wing, Buckley AFB, Colorado
- May 2011–July 2012, director of Space Forces, U.S. Air Forces Central, Al Udeid AB, Qatar
- July 2012–January 2014, director of strategic plans, programs, requirements, and assessments, Headquarters Air Force Global Strike Command, Barksdale AFB, Louisiana
- January 2014–June 2015, deputy director, Global Operations Directorate (J3), U.S. Strategic Command, Offutt AFB, Nebraska
- June 2015–July 2017, director of plans and policy (J5), U.S. Strategic Command, Offutt AFB, Nebraska
- July 2017–December 2017, director of operational capability requirements, Deputy Chief of Staff for Strategic Plans and Requirements, Headquarters U.S. Air Force, the Pentagon, Arlington, Virginia
- December 2017–December 2018, director of Air Force warfighting integration capability, Deputy Chief of Staff for Strategic Plans and Requirements, Headquarters U.S. Air Force, the Pentagon, Arlington, Virginia
- December 2018–February 2019, deputy, deputy chief of staff for strategy, integration and requirements, Headquarters U.S. Air Force, the Pentagon, Arlington, Virginia
- February 2019–October 2020, director of Space Force planning, Office of the Chief of Space Operations, U.S. Space Force, the Pentagon, Arlington, Virginia

== Awards and decorations ==
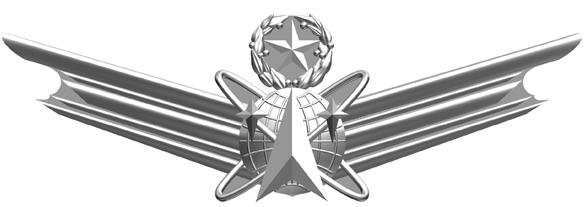
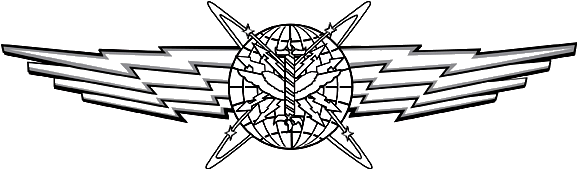
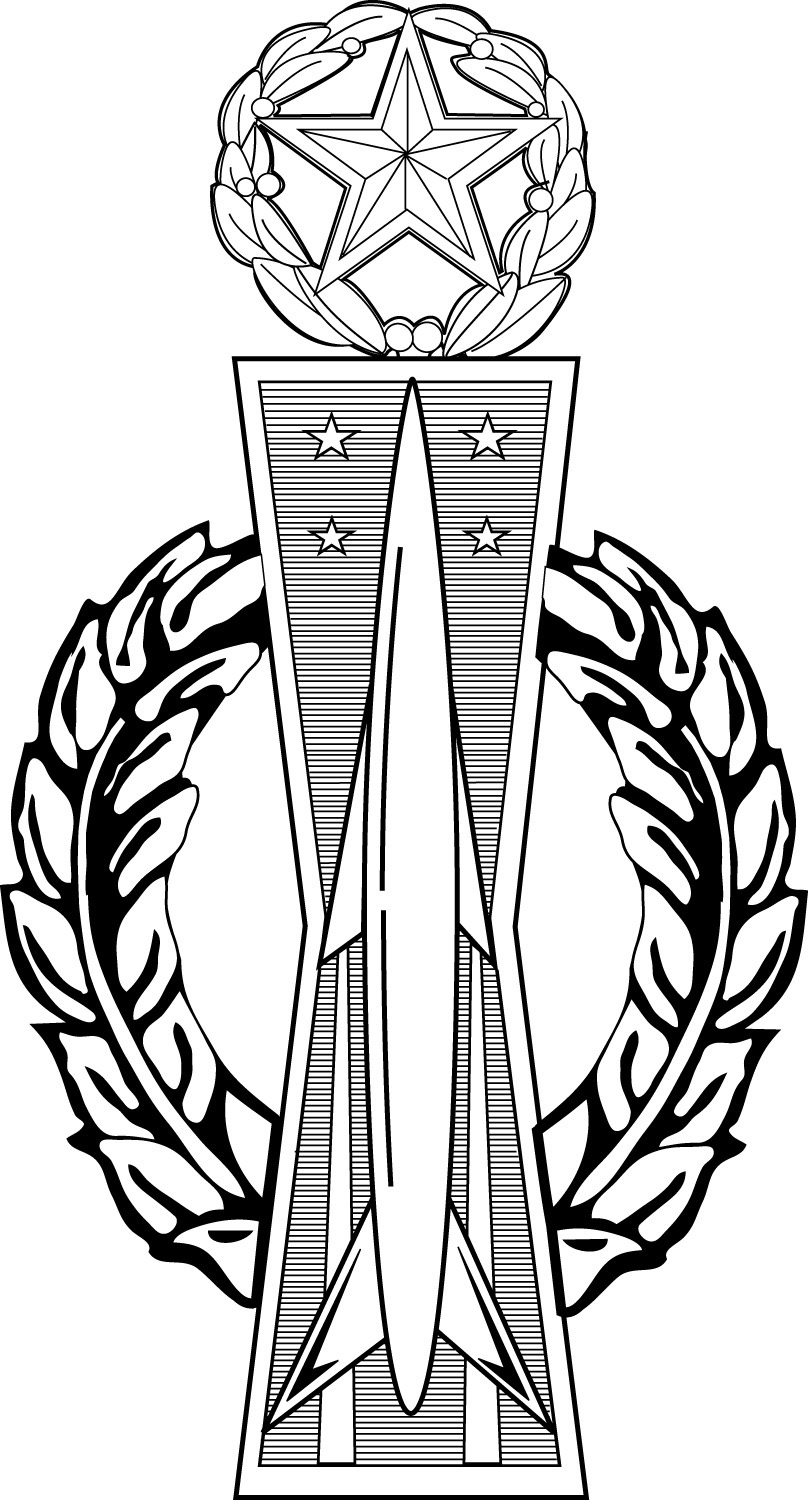
Command Space Operations Badge
Basic Cyberspace Operator Badge
Command Missile Operations Badge
Headquarters Air Force Badge
Office of the Secretary of Defense Identification Badge

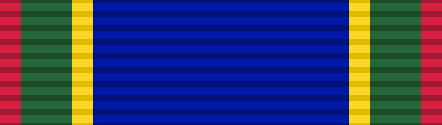
Defense Superior Service Medal with one bronze oak leaf cluster
Legion of Merit with two oak leaf clusters
Bronze Star Medal
Meritorious Service Medal with four oak leaf clusters
Air Force Commendation Medal
Air Force Achievement Medal
Joint Meritorious Unit Award
Air Force Outstanding Unit Award with three oak leaf clusters
National Reconnaissance Office Distinguished Service Medal (gold medal)
Combat Readiness Medal
National Defense Service Medal with one bronze service star
Southwest Asia Service Medal with two service stars
Global War on Terrorism Service Medal
Nuclear Deterrence Operations Service Medal
Air Force Expeditionary Service Ribbon with gold frame
Air Force Longevity Service Award with one silver and two bronze oak leaf clusters
Small Arms Expert Marksmanship Ribbon
Air Force Training Ribbon
Kuwait Liberation Medal (Saudi Arabia)
Kuwait Liberation Medal (Kuwait)

== Effective dates of promotion ==
Rank	Date
Second lieutenant	Sept. 12, 1987
First lieutenant	Sept. 12, 1989
Captain	Sept. 12, 1991
Major	Sept. 1, 1997
Lieutenant colonel	May 1, 2001
Colonel	Aug. 1, 2005
Brigadier general	June 2, 2012
Major general	Aug. 2, 2015

Military offices
Preceded by David J. Buck	Director of Space Forces of the United States Air Forces Central Command; 2011–2012	Succeeded by Keith W. Balts
Preceded by ???	Director of Strategic Plans, Programs, Requirements, and Assessments of the Air Force Global Strike Command; 2012–2014	Succeeded by Ferdinand Stoss
Preceded by David D. Thompson	Deputy Director for Global Operations of the United States Strategic Command; 2014–2015	Succeeded by John E. Shaw
Preceded by David D. Thompson	Director of Plans and Policy of the United States Strategic Command; 2015–2017	Succeeded by Nina M. Armagno
New office	Director of the Air Force Warfighting Integration Capability; 2017–2018	Succeeded by Michael A. Fantini
New office	Director of the Space Force Planning Task Force; 2019	Task force inactivated
New office	Director of Staff of the United States Space Force; Acting; 2020	Succeeded by B. Chance Saltzman; Acting
