= Director of Staff of the United States Space Force =

US Space Force senior officer

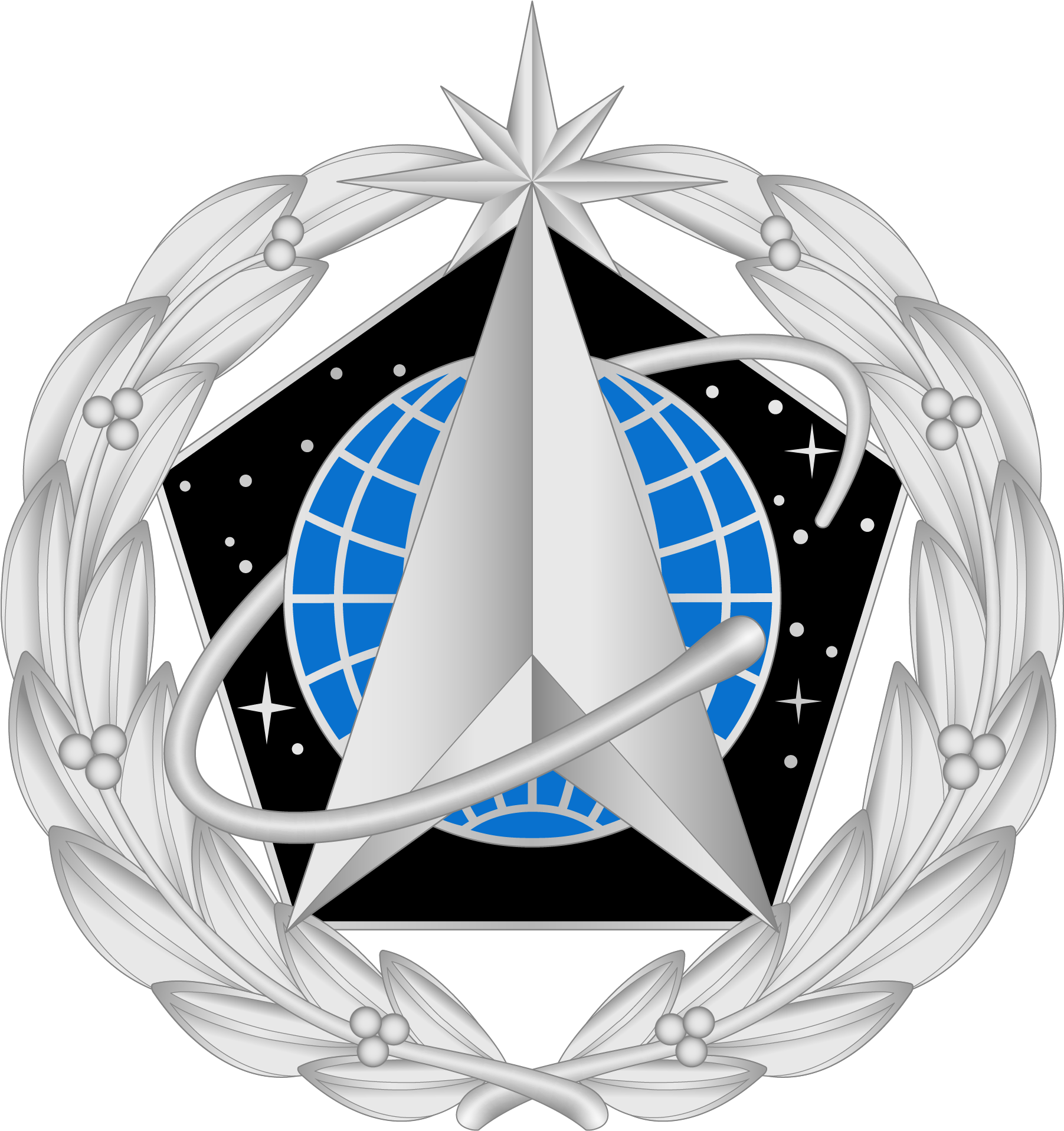
- Space Staff identification badge

- Flag of a Space Force major general

- Incumbent; Major General Matthew Cantore since ~29 June 2026
- United States Space Force
- Member of: Office of the Chief of Space Operations
- Reports to: Chief of Space Operations
- Appointer: The president; with Senate advice and consent
- Constituting instrument: 10 U.S.C. § 9083
- First holder: Nina Armagno
- Deputy: Deputy Director of Staff

The director of staff of the United States Space Force (SF/DS) is a senior leadership position in the United States Space Force held by a major general. The director of staff reports to the chief of space operations (CSO) and has overall responsibility for providing executive staff to the CSO, vice chief of space operations, and chief master sergeant of the Space Force.

The director of staff is responsible for the supervision of key enterprise matters related to integrating and synchronizing policies, plans, positions, procedures, and cross-functional issues for the Office of the Chief of Space Operations (informally referred to as the "Space Staff"), interacting with Office of the Secretary of Defense, Joint Staff, Department of State, United States Congress, and other U.S. government and state agencies on correspondence and tasking issues. The director of staff is responsible for the planning, coordinating, executing, and supervising of key forums, and ensuring the efficient execution of the Space Staff responsibilities. Additionally, the director of staff is responsible for administrative functions, and budget and execution of the Space Staff Program Element.

== History ==
The organizational structure of the Space Force headquarters was first proposed in February 2020 with a director of staff held by a lieutenant general. By July 2020, Major General B. Chance Saltzman was performing the duties in an acting capacity. On July 29, 2020, then-Major General Nina Armagno was nominated for the director of staff position. She was promoted on August 17, 2020, then becoming the inaugural director of staff of the U.S. Space Force.

On July 7, 2023, Armagno retired from the Space Force turning the position over to Major General Steven P. Whitney, making the three-star position a two-star position. The three-star billet for the director of staff was transferred to the commander of U.S Space Forces Space, following the planned elevation of Space Operations Command West as a component field command.

== Organization ==
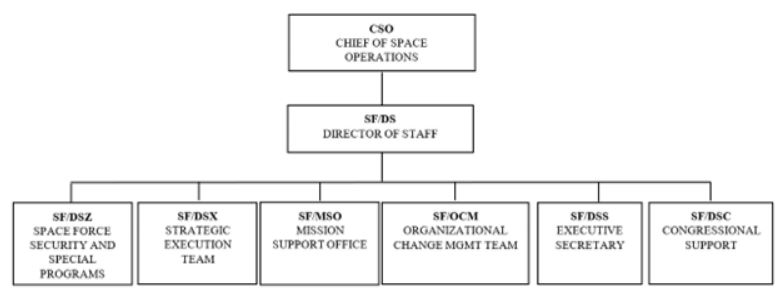
SF/DS organizational chart

- Director of Staff (SF/DS): Maj Gen Matthew Cantore
  - Deputy Director of Staff: Justin W. Phillips
    - Security and Special Programs (SF/DSZ)
    - Strategic Execution Team (SF/DSX)
    - Mission Support Office (SF/MSO)
    - Organizational Change Management Team (SF/OCM)
    - Executive Secretary (SF/DSS)
    - Congressional Affairs Office (SF/DSC)

== List of directors of staff ==
No.	Director of Staff		Term			Chief of Space Operations	Ref.
No.	Portrait	Name	Took office	Left office	Term length	Chief of Space Operations	Ref.
–	Clinton Crosier	Major General; Clinton Crosier (born c. 1965); Acting	~20 December 2019	June 2020	~178 days	John W. Raymond	
–	B. Chance Saltzman	Major General; B. Chance Saltzman (born 1969); Acting	June 2020	7 August 2020	~53 days	John W. Raymond	
1	Nina Armagno	Lieutenant General; Nina Armagno (born 1966)	7 August 2020	7 July 2023	2 years, 334 days	John W. Raymond; B. Chance Saltzman	
2	Steven P. Whitney	Major General; Steven P. Whitney (born 1970)	7 July 2023	30 October 2025	2 years, 115 days	B. Chance Saltzman	
–	Shariful M. Khan	Brigadier General; Shariful M. Khan (born c. 1975); Acting	December 2025	~29 June 2026	~196 days	B. Chance Saltzman	
3	Matthew Cantore	Major General; Matthew Cantore (born 1976)	~29 June 2026	Incumbent	138 days	B. Chance Saltzman	

== See also ==
- Director of Staff of the United States Air Force
- Space Staff
- United States Space Force
