= Troy Meink =

American government official

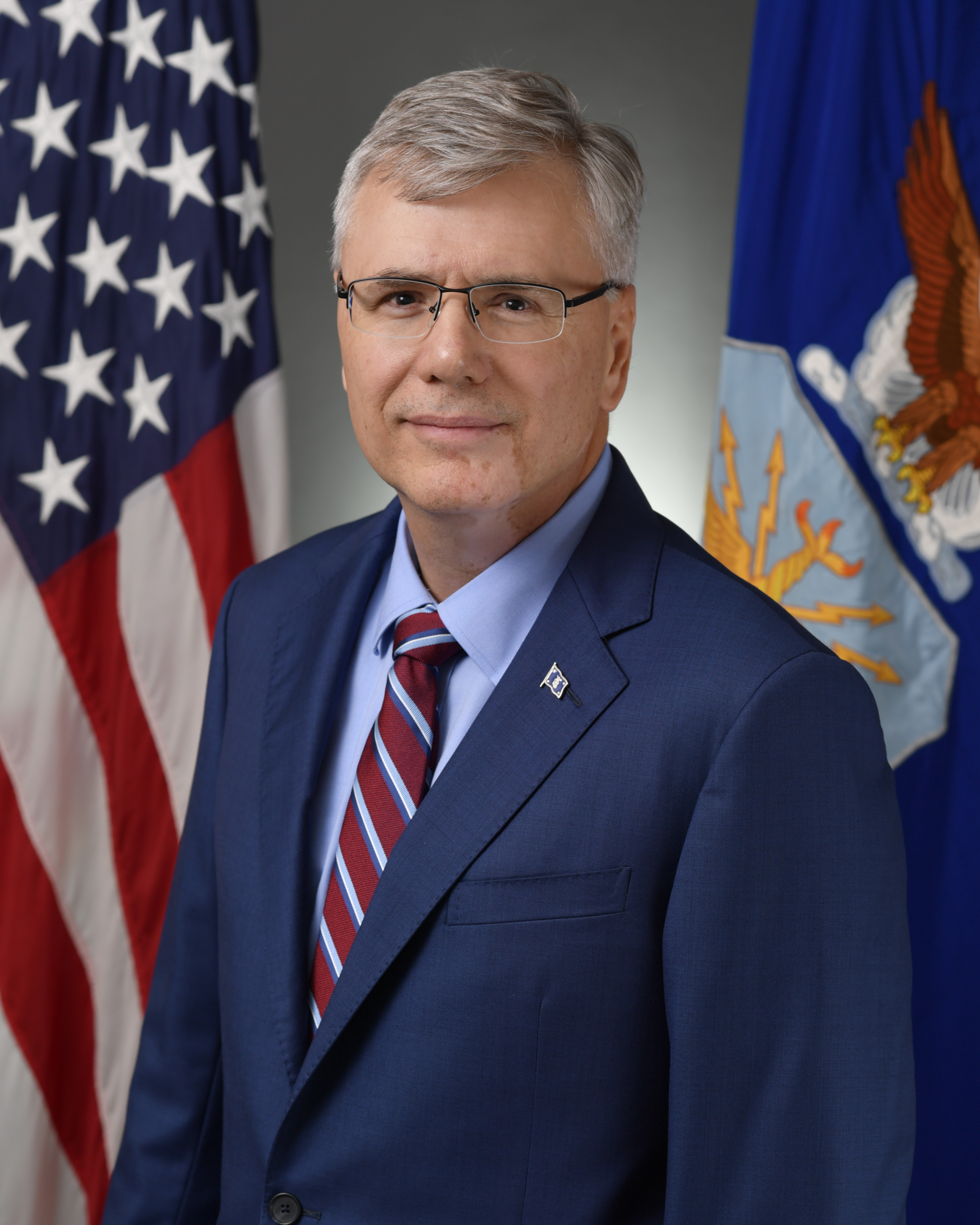
- Official portrait, 2025

27th United States Secretary of the Air Force
- Incumbent
- Assumed office May 16, 2025
- President: Donald Trump
- Deputy: Edwin Oshiba (acting); Matthew Lohmeier
- Preceded by: Frank Kendall III

Principal Deputy Director of the National Reconnaissance Office
- In office October 5, 2020 – May 16, 2025
- President: Donald Trump; Joe Biden; Donald Trump
- Preceded by: Frank Calvelli
- Succeeded by: William B. Adkins

Deputy Under Secretary of the Air Force for Space
- In office November 2013 – June 2014
- President: Barack Obama
- Preceded by: Richard McKinney
- Succeeded by: Winston Beauchamp

Personal details
- Education: South Dakota State University (BS); Ohio State University (MS, PhD)

Military service
- Allegiance: United States
- Branch/service: United States Air Force; Air Force Reserve
- Years of service: 1988–1993 (active); 1994–1998 (reserve)
- Unit: National Air and Space Intelligence Center
- Battles/wars: Gulf War

Troy Edward Meink (/mink/ MEENK) is an American government official who has served as the 27th secretary of the Air Force since 2025. He previously served as the principal deputy director of the National Reconnaissance Office (NRO).

== Early life ==
Meink is from Lemmon, South Dakota. He attended South Dakota State University, where he received a degree in mechanical engineering in 1988. He later attended Ohio State University, earning a master's degree in aeronautical and astronautical engineering in 1995 and a doctorate in the field in 1999.

== Career ==
Meink entered the United States Air Force in 1988 through the Reserve Officers' Training Corps (ROTC) program at South Dakota State University. He started his career as a KC-135 tanker navigator and instructor and then a lead test engineer for the design and evaluation of ballistic missile test vehicles for the Missile Defense Agency. While a KC-135 tanker navigator, he was stationed at Grissom Air Force Base and served during the Gulf War in Iraq.

Meink subsequently led development for the Military Satellite Communications Joint Program Office and served as program director for the Transformational Satellite Communications System. He was a director in the office of the assistant secretary of defense and a director for signal intelligence systems acquisition for the National Reconnaissance Office (NRO) from 2006 to 2013.

Meink then served as the Deputy Under Secretary of the Air Force for Space from November 2013 to June 2014. Afterwards, he was assistant director of national intelligence for systems and resource analyses from 2014 to 2017, before becoming the director of Geospatial Intelligence Systems Acquisition at the NRO. In October 2020, he was appointed the principal deputy director of the NRO by President Donald Trump. In this position, he oversaw a budget of over $15 billion to develop satellite capabilities.

On January 16, 2025, President-elect Trump announced Meink as the nominee to serve as United States Secretary of the Air Force. Meink's appointment had been quietly encouraged by Elon Musk. His nomination was confirmed by the Senate in a 74–25 vote on May 13, and he was sworn in on May 16, 2025.

Meink disclosed at an Air & Space Forces Association conference on September 14, 2026 that the United States had already deployed via the U.S. Space Force active "on-orbit space control weapons capable of defending the joint force against hostile adversary action".

Political offices
Preceded by Gary A. Ashworth; Acting	United States Secretary of the Air Force; 2025–present	Incumbent
