= Frank Calvelli =

American intelligence official

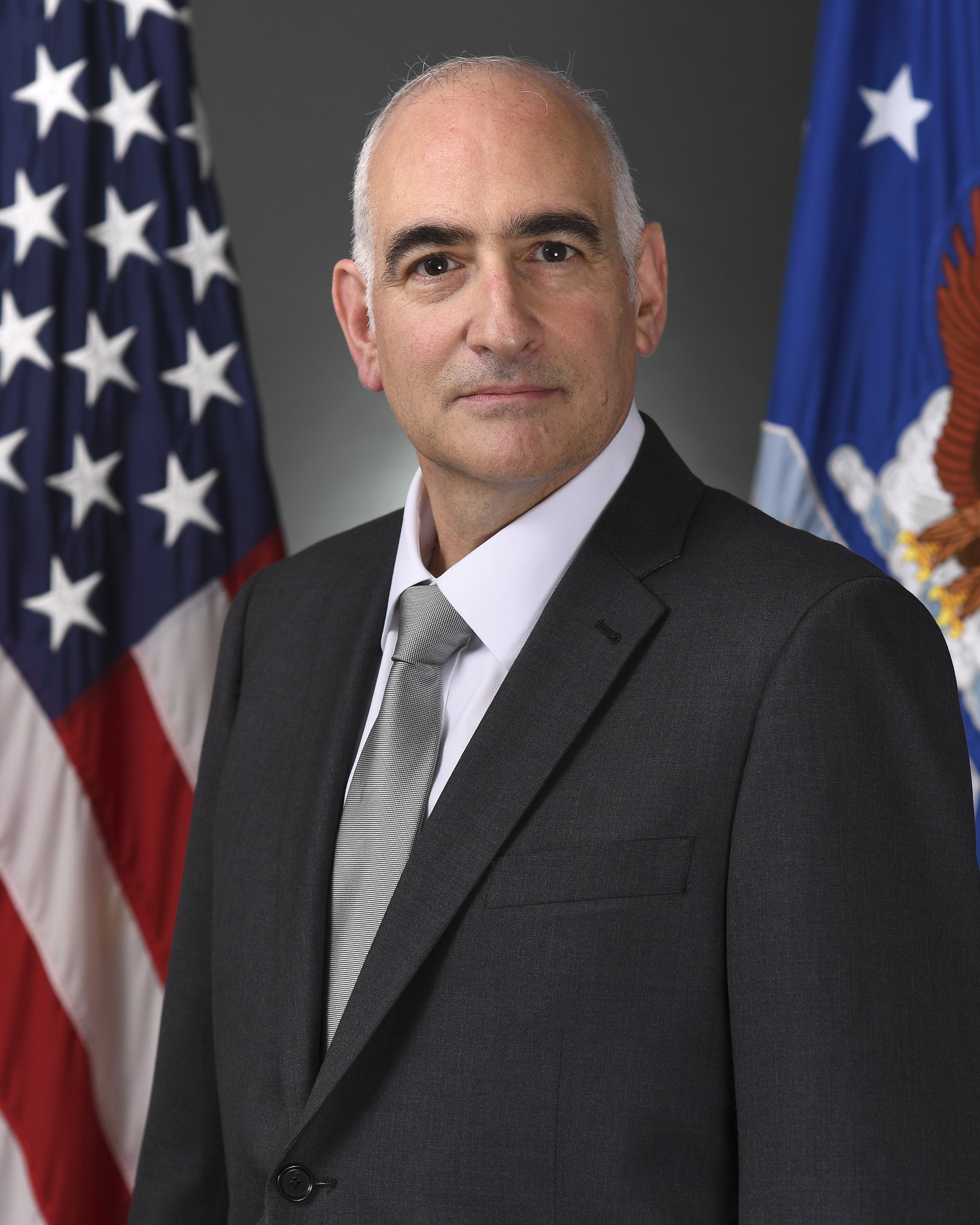

Assistant Secretary of the Air Force for Space Acquisition and Integration
- In office May 5, 2022 – January 20, 2025
- President: Joe Biden
- Preceded by: Steven P. Whitney (acting)
- Succeeded by: Erich Hernandez-Baquero

Principal Deputy Director of the National Reconnaissance Office
- In office July 6, 2012 – October 5, 2020
- President: Barack Obama; Donald Trump
- Preceded by: Betty J. Sapp
- Succeeded by: Troy Meink

Personal details
- Education: State University of New York at Potsdam (BS); Loyola University Maryland (MBA)

Frank Calvelli is an American intelligence official who had served the assistant secretary of the Air Force for space acquisition and integration (SAF/SQ). He previously served as the principal deputy director of the National Reconnaissance Office from 2012 to 2020. In 2021, he joined Booz Allen Hamilton as senior vice president.

== Education ==
Calvelli earned a Bachelor of Science degree from the State University of New York at Potsdam and a Master of Business Administration from Loyola University Maryland.

== Career ==
Calvelli served for over 30 years in the Central Intelligence Agency, where he was assigned to the National Reconnaissance Office. From July 6, 2012 to October 5, 2020, he served as deputy director of the NRO. He joined Booz Allen Hamilton's national security program as senior vice president in 2021.

In December 2021, Joe Biden nominated Calvelli to serve as the first assistant secretary of the Air Force for space acquisition and integration.
