= 6th Space Operations Squadron =

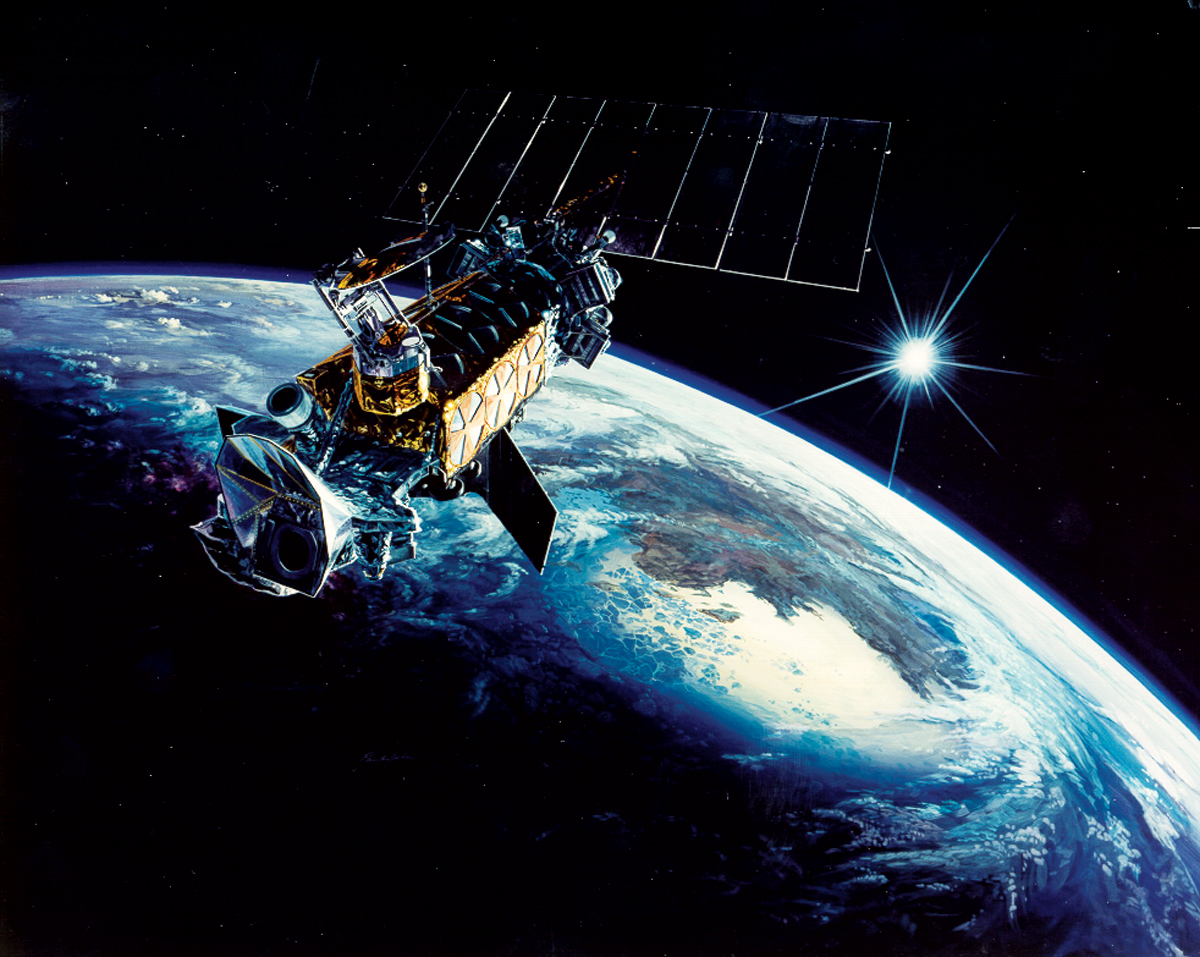
- Defense Meteorological Satellite Program Block 5 satellite
- Active: 1983–1998; 1998–present
- Country: United States
- Branch: United States Air Force
- Type: Satellite Operations
- Role: Defense Meteorological Satellite Program Control
- Garrison/HQ: Schriever AFB, Colorado
- Mottos: Supra et Ultra Latin Above and Beyond
- Decorations: Air Force Outstanding Unit Award

Commanders
- Notable commanders: Gen John E. Hyten

Insignia
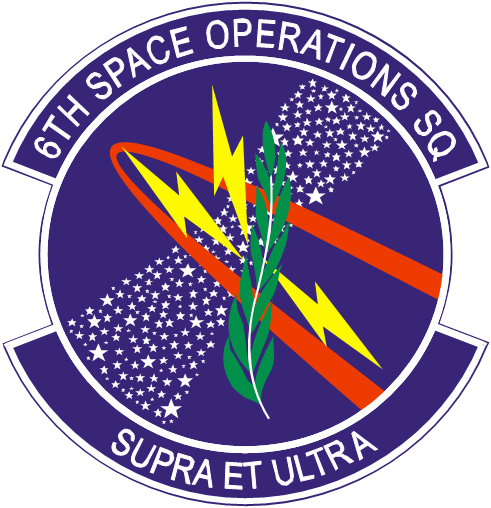
- 6th Space Operations Squadron emblem (approved 14 January 2008)

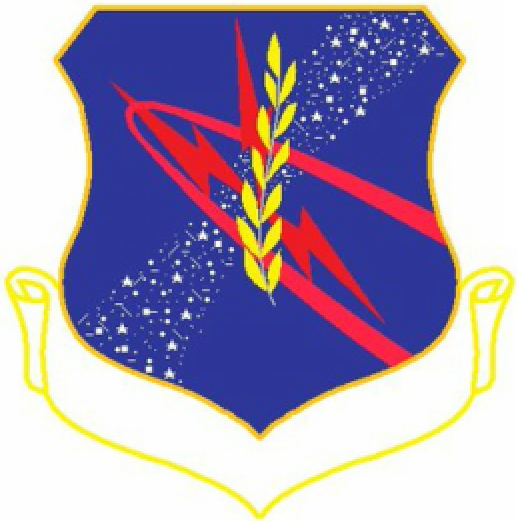
- 4000th Support Gp emblem (approved 10 November 1964)

The 6th Space Operations Squadron is an Air Force Reserve satellite command and control squadron located at Schriever Space Force Base, Colorado. The squadron is a backup to NOAA for Defense Meteorological Satellite Program operations.

== Mission ==
The 6th Space Operations Squadron provides a backup command and control center for the Defense Meteorological Satellite Program (DMSP). DMSP is the longest running production satellite program ever. The DMSP satellite constellation provides strategic and tactical weather prediction to aid military operations planning at sea, on land, and in the air. The satellites can image visible and infrared cloud cover, measure precipitation, surface temperature, and soil moisture. In addition, it collects specialized global meteorological oceanographic and solar-geophysical information in all weather conditions. It also has sensors for space weather data that is used to assist in high-frequency communications, over-the-horizon radar and spacecraft drag and reentry tasks. The information provided by the DMSP satellites is used to compile various worldwide weather products for numerous users, such as the Air Force Weather Agency and Fleet Numerical Meteorology and Oceanography Center as well as civilian authorities through the Department of Commerce. The 6th is located at Schriever Air Force Base, Colorado.

== History ==
The 4000th Support Group was organized on 1 February 1963 as a component of Strategic Air Command. It was reassigned to the 1st Strategic Aerospace Division on 1 January 1966. On 1 January 1973, the organization was redesignated 4000th Aerospace Application Group without change in assignment or location. It was redesignated 4000th Satellite Operations Group on 3 April 1981. .

On 1 May 1983, the 4000th Satellite Operations Group at Offutt Air Force Base was transferred to the newly formed Air Force Space Command under the 1st Space Wing and was given a new designation, the 1000th Satellite Operations Group ('One Grand'). The group was reassigned to the 2d Space Wing on 1 April 1986. In May 1989, Detachment 1 at Fairchild Air Force Base, Washington, was upgraded to squadron status, becoming the 5th Satellite Control Squadron. On 30 January 1992, the group was reassigned to the 50th Space Wing. On 31 July 1992, the 1000th Satellite Operations Group re-designated as the 6th Space Operations Squadron and was reassigned to the 50th Operations Group. The unit was still a Regular Air Force unit and was still stationed at Offutt.

In 1994, President Bill Clinton signed a bill that merged federal weather programs. Prior to the merge, federal programs were deemed to be redundant. This merger would save the government money and allow one entity to control national weather products. The merger also moved weather operations to the National Oceanographic and Atmospheric Administration in Suitland, Maryland.

On 30 September 1998, the 6th Space Operations Squadron was inactivated. It activated in the Air Force reserve with assignment to the 310th Space Group at Schriever Air Force Base, Colorado on 1 October 1998.

The squadron's operations have been command and control of the Defense Meteorological Satellite Program (DMSP) satellites since 1 February 1963.

== Lineage ==
- Designated as the 4000th Support Group and organized on 1 February 1963

Redesignated 4000th Aerospace Application Group on 1 January 1973
Redesignate 4000th Satellite Operations Group on 3 April 1981
Redesignated 1000th Satellite Operations Group on 1 May 1983
Redesignated 6th Space Operations Squadron on 31 July 1992
Inactivated on 30 September 1998

- Activated in the reserve on 1 October 1998

=== Assignments ===
- Strategic Air Command, 1 February 1963
- 1st Strategic Aerospace Division, I January 1966
- 1st Space Wing, 1 May 1983
- 2d Space Wing, 1 April 1986
- 50th Space Wing, 30 January 1992
- 50th Operations Group, 31 July 1992 – 30 September 1998
- 310th Space Group, 1 October 1998
- 310th Operations Group, 7 March 2008

=== Stations ===
- Offutt Air Force Base, Nebraska, 1 February 1963 – 30 September 1998
- Schriever Air Force Base, Colorado, 1 October 1998 – present

=== Spacecraft controlled ===
- Defense Meteorological Satellite Program (1963–1998; 1998 – present)
