= Global Positioning Systems Directorate =

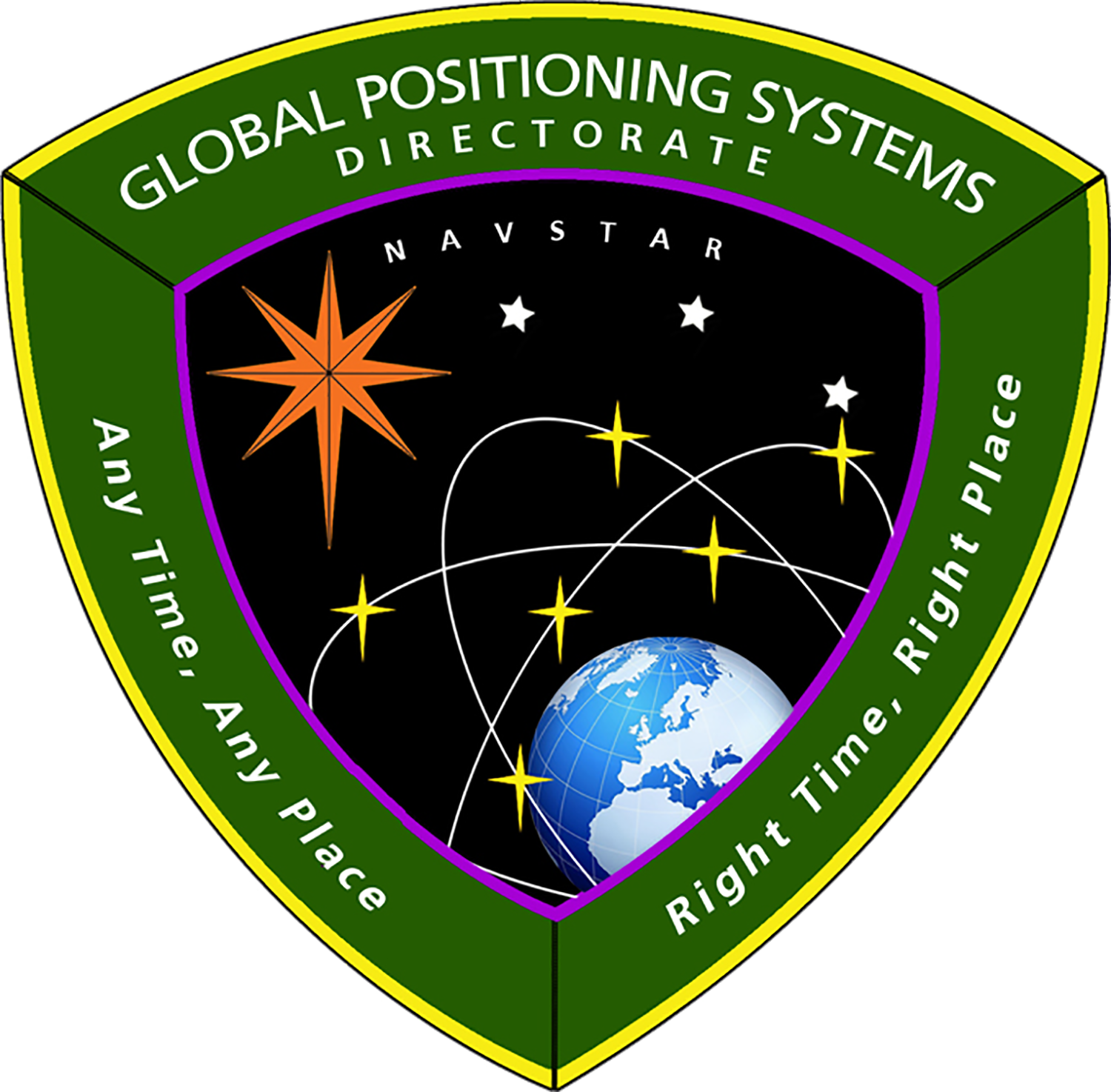
- Active: 1973-present
- Country: United States
- Branch: United States Space Force
- Role: GPS service
- Size: ~700 military & civilian
- Part of: Space and Missile Systems Center
- Garrison/HQ: Los Angeles AFB, California

Commanders
- Current commander: Colonel John C. Claxton

The United States Space Force's Global Positioning Systems Directorate is a unit of Space Systems Command located at Los Angeles AFB, California.

== Mission ==
To develop, produce and maintain the fleet of Global Positioning System satellites, their associated ground control equipment, and end-user technologies. The day-to-day operations of the GPS network are handled by the 50th Space Wing.

== Previous designations ==
- GPS Joint Program Office (JPO) 1973–2006
- Global Positioning Systems Wing(GPSW) 2006-

== Bases stationed ==
- Los Angeles AFB, California

== List of directors ==
- Col Wesley Ballenger Jr., ~2003–18 June 2007
- Col David Madden, 18 June 2007–July 2010
- Col Bernard Gruber, July 2010–13 June 2013
- Col William Cooley, 13 June 2013 – 8 July 2015
- Col Steven P. Whitney, 8 July 2015–June 2019
- Col John C. Claxton
