= Wayne Monteith =

U.S. Air Force general

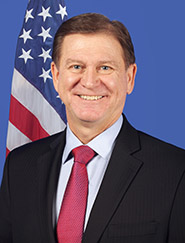
- Official portrait, 2019
- Military career
- Allegiance: United States
- Branch: United States Air Force
- Service years: 1989–2018
- Rank: Brigadier General
- Commands: 45th Space Wing; 50th Space Wing; 392nd Training Squadron
- Awards: Air Force Distinguished Service Medal; Defense Superior Service Medal; Legion of Merit (3)

Wayne R. Monteith is a retired United States Air Force brigadier general who was the Associate Administrator for Commercial Space Transportation of the Federal Aviation Administration. In the U.S. Air Force, he last served as the Commander of the 45th Space Wing.

Military offices
Preceded by Cary C. Chun	Commander of 50th Space Wing; 2009–2011	Succeeded by James P. Ross
Preceded by ???	Senior Military Assistant to the Under Secretary of the Air Force; 2013–2014	Succeeded by Andrew Gebara
Preceded by Stephen W. Oliver	Senior Military Assistant to the Secretary of the Air Force; 2014–2015	Succeeded by Brook J. Leonard
Preceded by Nina Armagno	Commander of the 45th Space Wing; 2015–2018	Succeeded by Douglas Schiess
