= Nina Armagno =

U.S. Space Force general

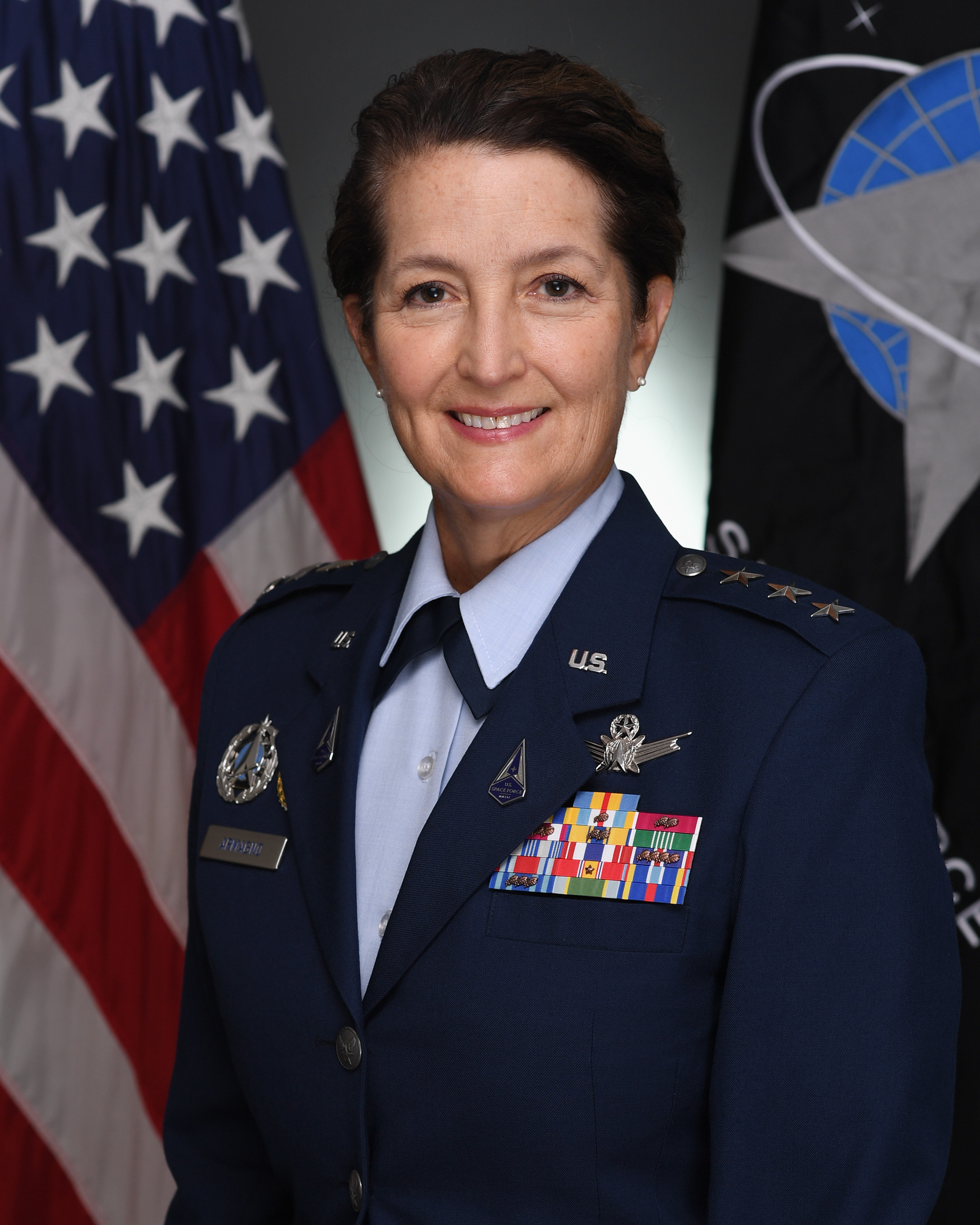
- Official portrait, 2021
- Born: March 20, 1966 (age 60); Dundee, Illinois, U.S.
- Education: United States Air Force Academy (BS): Chapman University (MA); National War College (MS)
- Spouse: Eddie Papczun
- Military career
- Allegiance: United States
- Branch: United States Air Force: United States Space Force
- Service years: 1988–2020 (Air Force): 2020–2023 (Space Force)
- Rank: Lieutenant General
- Commands: 45th Space Wing: 30th Space Wing; 21st Operations Group; 6th Space Warning Squadron
- Awards: Defense Distinguished Service Medal: Air Force Distinguished Service Medal (2); Defense Superior Service Medal (2); Legion of Merit (3)

Nina Marion Armagno (born March 20, 1966) is a retired United States Space Force lieutenant general who served as the first director of staff of the United States Space Force from 2020 to 2023. She is the service's first female general officer and the only officer to have commanded both the 30th Space Wing and the 45th Space Wing. Before transferring to the Space Force, she was a major general in the United States Air Force, where she served for over 32 years.

After retiring from active duty, Armagno joined Rocket Lab's board of directors.

== Early life and education ==
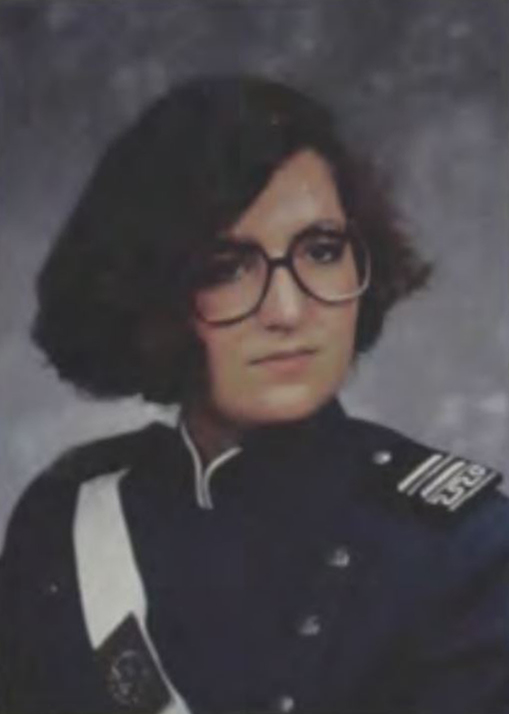
Armagno as a cadet at USAFA

Armagno was born in 1966 to Anthony and Naida Armagno. A native of Dundee, Illinois, she graduated from Dundee-Crown High School in 1984 where she was the class valedictorian and class president. She grew up in suburban Chicago.

Wanting to become an astronaut, Armagno received a Bachelor of Science degree from the United States Air Force Academy in Colorado Springs, Colorado in 1988. She graduated Squadron Officer School in 1992, at Maxwell Air Force Base in Alabama. She received a Master of Arts degree in 1999, in Education Administration and Management, from Chapman University in California. She graduated from the Air Command and Staff College in 2000, by correspondence. In 2002, she participated in an Air Force Legislative Fellowship in Washington, D.C. In 2003, she received a certificate in Legislative Studies from Georgetown University in Washington, D.C. She graduated from the Air War College in 2003, by correspondence. In 2007, she received a Master of Science degree, in National Security Studies, from the National War College in Washington, D.C. In 2010, she attended the United States Air Force Enterprise Leadership Seminar at the University of Virginia, Darden School of Business, in Virginia. Also in 2010, she attended the Leadership Development Program at the Center for Creative Leadership in Colorado Springs, Colorado.

== Military service ==
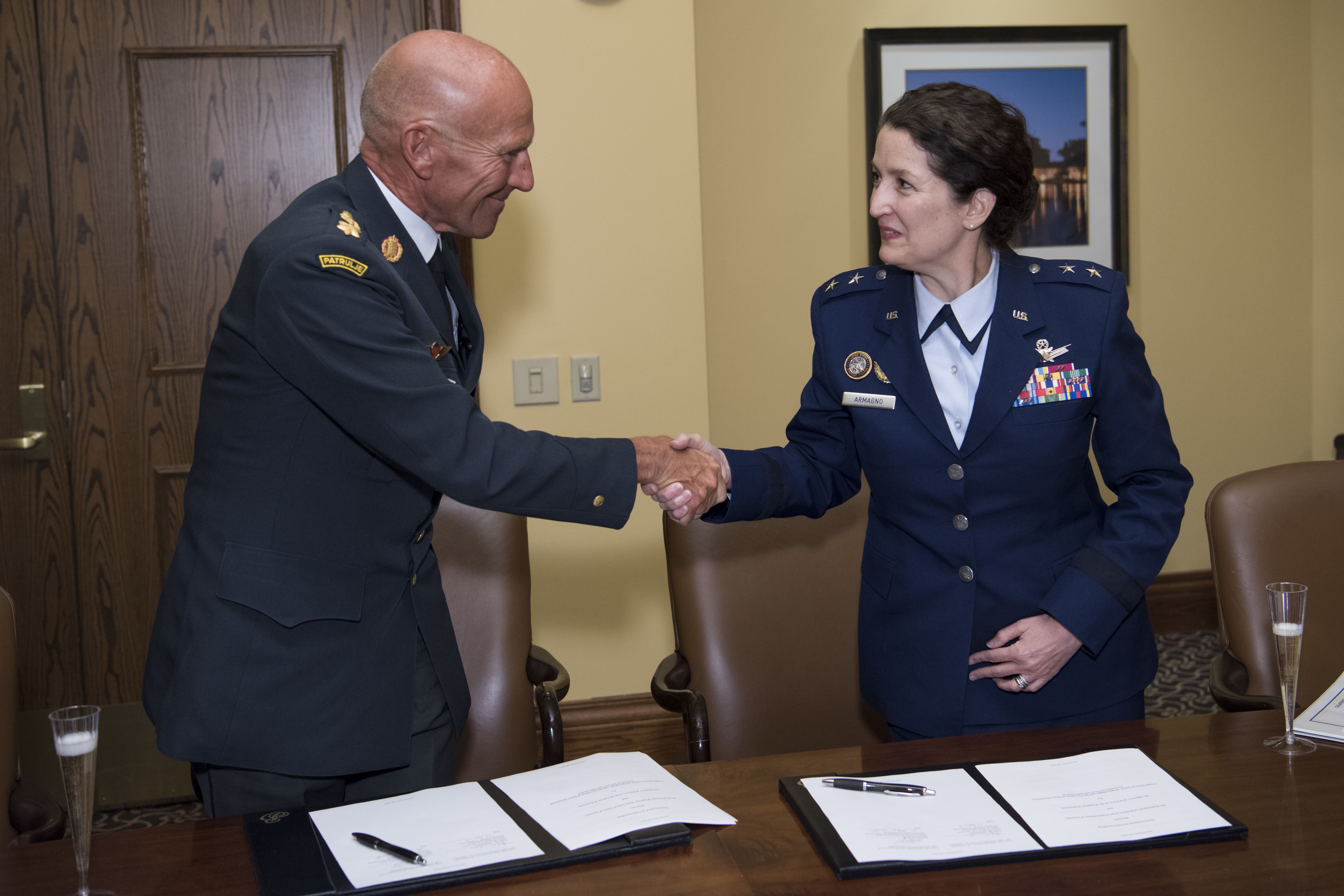
Maj. Gen. Armagno shakes hands with Maj. Gen. Agner Rokos of Denmark before signing a memorandum of understanding at the 34th Annual Space Symposium on April 17, 2018.

Armagno entered the Air Force after graduating from the United States Air Force Academy, Colorado, in June 1988. Her experience in space systems operations includes combat mission ready operator, instructor, evaluator and flight commander in strategic missile warning, space surveillance, space control, space launch and theater missile warning mission areas. She was the operations officer at the 1st Space Launch Squadron, Cape Canaveral Air Force Station, Florida.

Armagno served as second Commander, 30th Space Wing, Vandenberg Air Force Base, California, responsible for space lift and range operations, and support of operational and developmental missile system testing for the Department of Defense from the West Coast of the United States. She has served as the installation commander of the 6th Space Warning Squadron at Cape Cod Air Force Station, Massachusetts, the commander and deputy commander, 21st Operations Group, Peterson Air Force Base, Colorado, as the Department of Defense senior military assistant and chief of staff to the director, Operational Test and Evaluation, Office of the Secretary of Defense. In addition, she has held staff assignments at Headquarters U.S. Air Force, Headquarters Air Force Space Command, Headquarters 14th Air Force and the 381st Training Group and served as an Air Force Legislative Fellow in the office of Congresswoman Ellen Tauscher.

On June 12, 2013, Armagno was promoted to brigadier general and took command of the 45th Space Wing and director of the Eastern Range at Patrick Air Force Base, Florida. She also became the first officer to command both the 30th Space Wing and the 45th Space Wing. There, she was responsible for the processing and launching of U.S. government and commercial satellites from Cape Canaveral Air Force Station, Florida. She was also the final approval authority for all launches on the Eastern Range, a 15-million-square-mile area which supports an average of 15 launches per year aboard Delta, Atlas, Falcon, Navy, and emerging launch vehicles. In addition, she managed wing launch and range infrastructure supporting NASA, commercial, and missile test missions.

Armagno relinquished command of the 45th Space Wing to Wayne Monteith on August 4, 2015, and was assigned as the director of strategic plans, programs, requirements, and analysis of the Air Force Space Command, where she was responsible for developing strategy, doctrine, and policy for the command's space and cyberspace operations, defining the future of space and cyberspace systems through requirements definition, mission area architectures, analysis, science and technology development in support of the joint warfighter, Department of Defense, civil, and national users.

In June 2017, Armagno was reassigned as director of plans and policy at the United States Strategic Command. She stayed there for a year before getting reassigned to the Pentagon to serve as the director for space programs at the Office of the Assistant Secretary for Acquisition.

When the Space Force was established in 2019, Armagno was tapped by then-Lieutenant General David D. Thompson to help stand-up the new service, working as the S2/3/4/6/8/9/10 while still officially assigned as the director of space programs. She was nominated on July 28, 2020, for transfer to the United States Space Force and promotion to lieutenant general. She was also assigned to serve as its first director of staff. She transferred and was promoted on August 17, 2020, becoming the first female general officer in the Space Force.

Armagno retired from active duty on July 7, 2023.

After retiring from active duty, Armagno joined Rocket Lab's board of directors.

== Personal life ==
Armagno's husband is Eddie Papczun, a retired Air Force officer whom she met when they were both captains.

== Awards and decorations ==
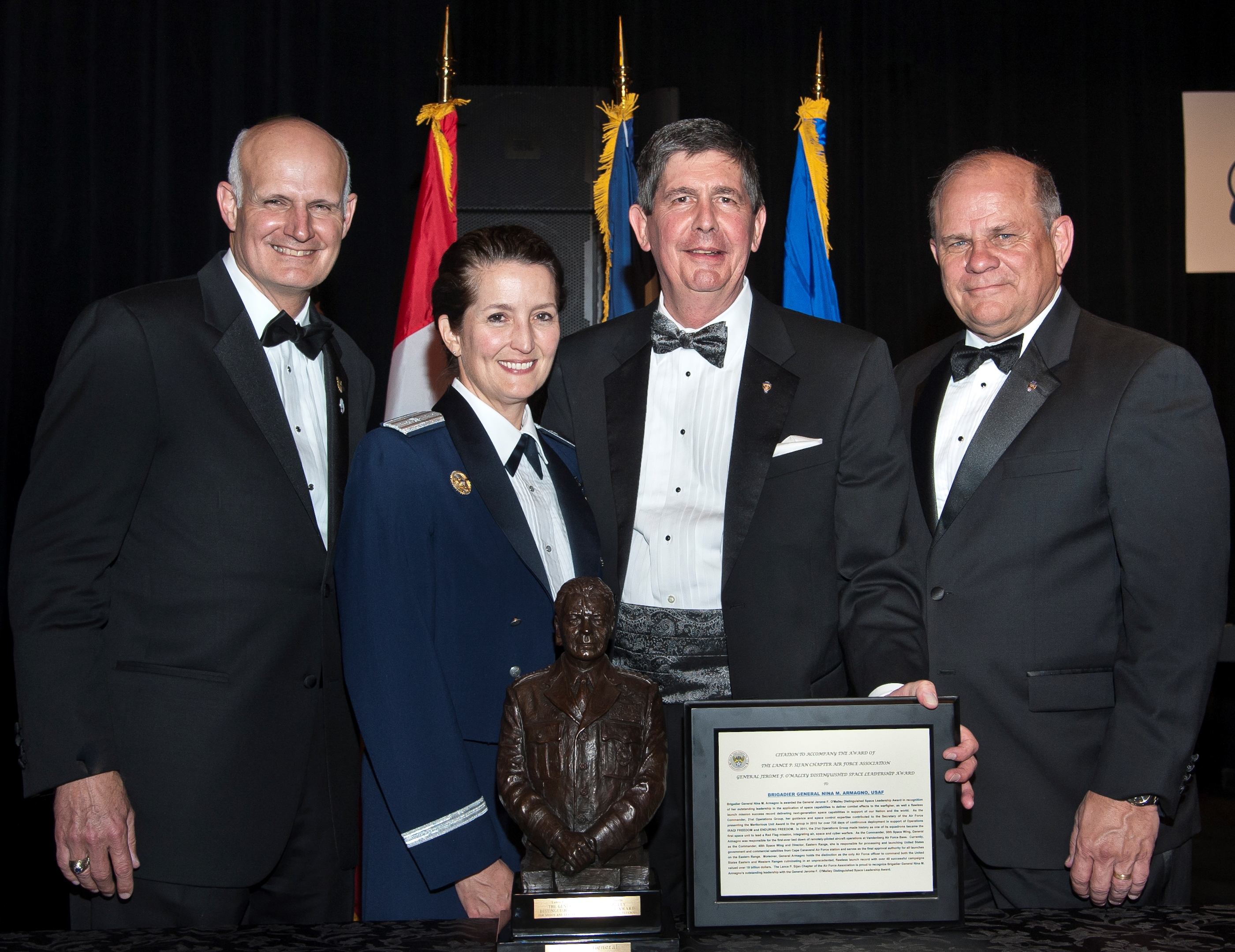
Armagno receives the Air Force Association's 2015 Jerome F. O'Malley Distinguished Space Leadership Award

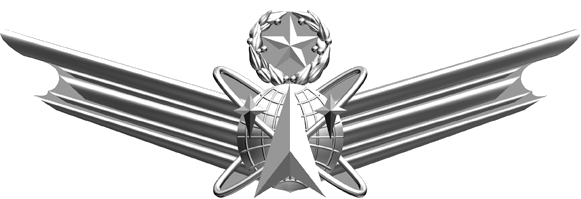
Command Space Operations Badge

Office of the Secretary of Defense Badge

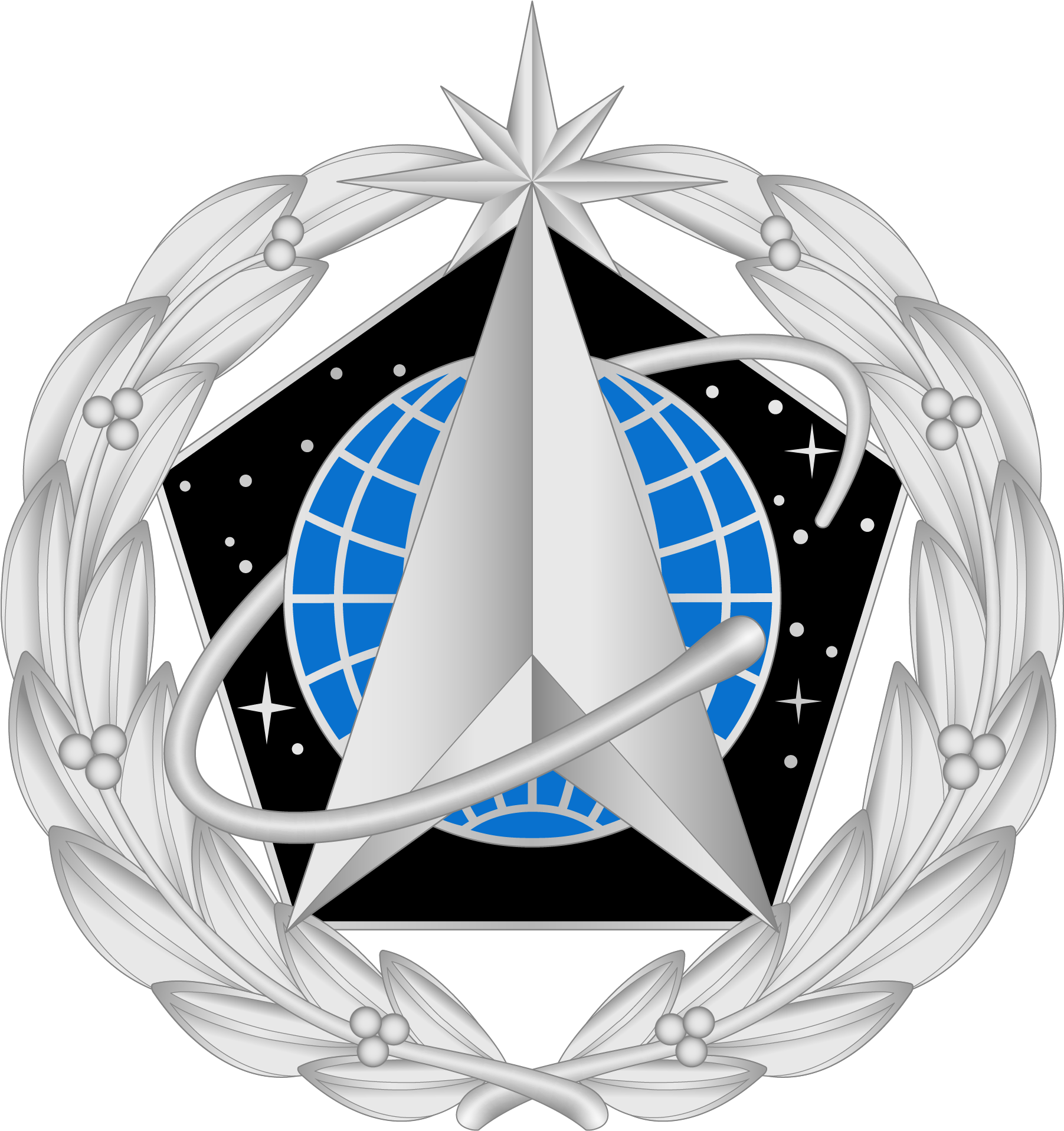

Space Staff Badge

Defense Distinguished Service Medal
Air Force Distinguished Service Medal
Defense Superior Service Medal with one bronze oak leaf cluster
Legion of Merit with two bronze oak leaf clusters
Meritorious Service Medal with three bronze oak leaf clusters
Air Force Commendation Medal with two bronze oak leaf clusters
Army Commendation Medal
Air Force Achievement Medal
Air Force Meritorious Unit Award
Air Force Outstanding Unit Award with four bronze oak leaf clusters
Combat Readiness Medal
National Defense Service Medal with one bronze service star
Global War on Terrorism Service Medal
Air Force Longevity Service Award with one silver and two bronze oak leaf clusters
Small Arms Expert Marksmanship Ribbon
Air Force Training Ribbon

- Women of Influence Award (2010)
- Gen Jerome F. O'Malley Distinguished Space Leadership Award (2014)
- Member, Council on Foreign Relations (2021)
- Daughters of the American Revolution Patriot Award (2023)

== Dates of promotion ==
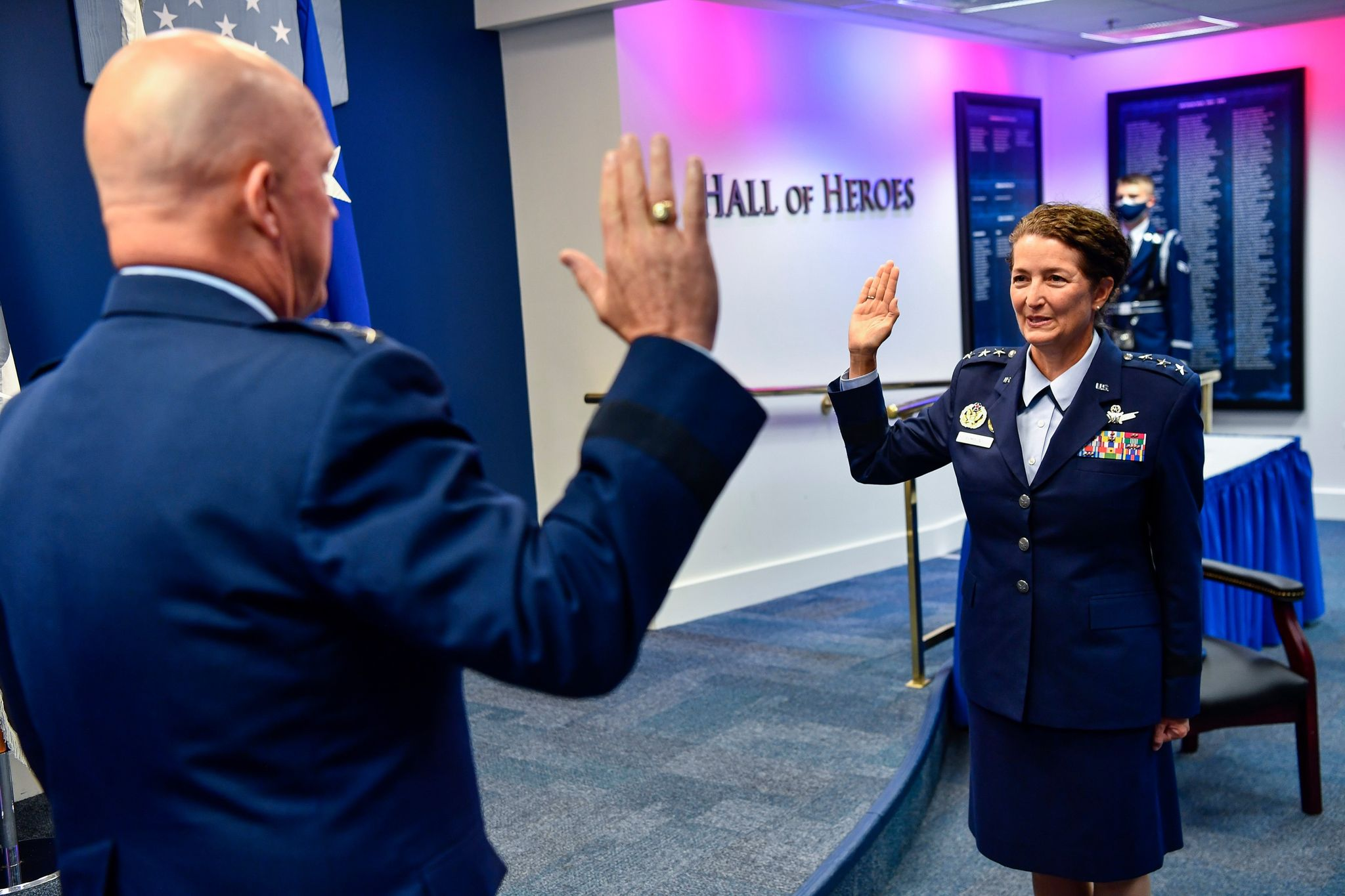
Chief of Space Operations Raymond swearing in Armagno as a U.S. Space Force lieutenant general, August 17, 2020.

Rank	Branch	Date
Second Lieutenant	Air Force	June 1, 1988
First Lieutenant	Air Force	June 1, 1990
Captain	Air Force	June 1, 1992
Major	Air Force	October 1, 1999
Lieutenant Colonel	Air Force	March 1, 2003
Colonel	Air Force	September 1, 2007
Brigadier General	Air Force	June 12, 2013
Major General	Air Force	June 15, 2016
Lieutenant General	Space Force	August 7, 2020

== Writings ==
- Fortifying Stability in Space: Establishing the US Space Force

Military offices
Preceded by Chris D. Crawford	Commander of the 21st Operations Group; 2009–2011	Succeeded by Jennifer L. Moore
Preceded by Richard W. Boltz	Commander of the 30th Space Wing; 2012–2013	Succeeded by Keith Balts
Preceded by Anthony J. Cotton	Commander of the 45th Space Wing; 2013–2015	Succeeded by Wayne Monteith
Preceded by Terrence Feehan	Director of Strategic Plans, Programs, Requirements and Analysis of the Air Force Space Command; 2015–2017	Succeeded by John E. Shaw
Preceded by Clinton Crosier	Director of Plans and Policy of the United States Strategic Command; 2017–2018	Succeeded by Richard A. Correll
Preceded by Mark Baird	Director for Space Programs of the Office of the Assistant Secretary for Acquisition; 2018–2020	Succeeded by Steven P. Whitney
New office	Director of Staff of the United States Space Force; 2020–2023	Succeeded by Steven P. Whitney
