= Michael Guetlein =

U.S. Space Force general

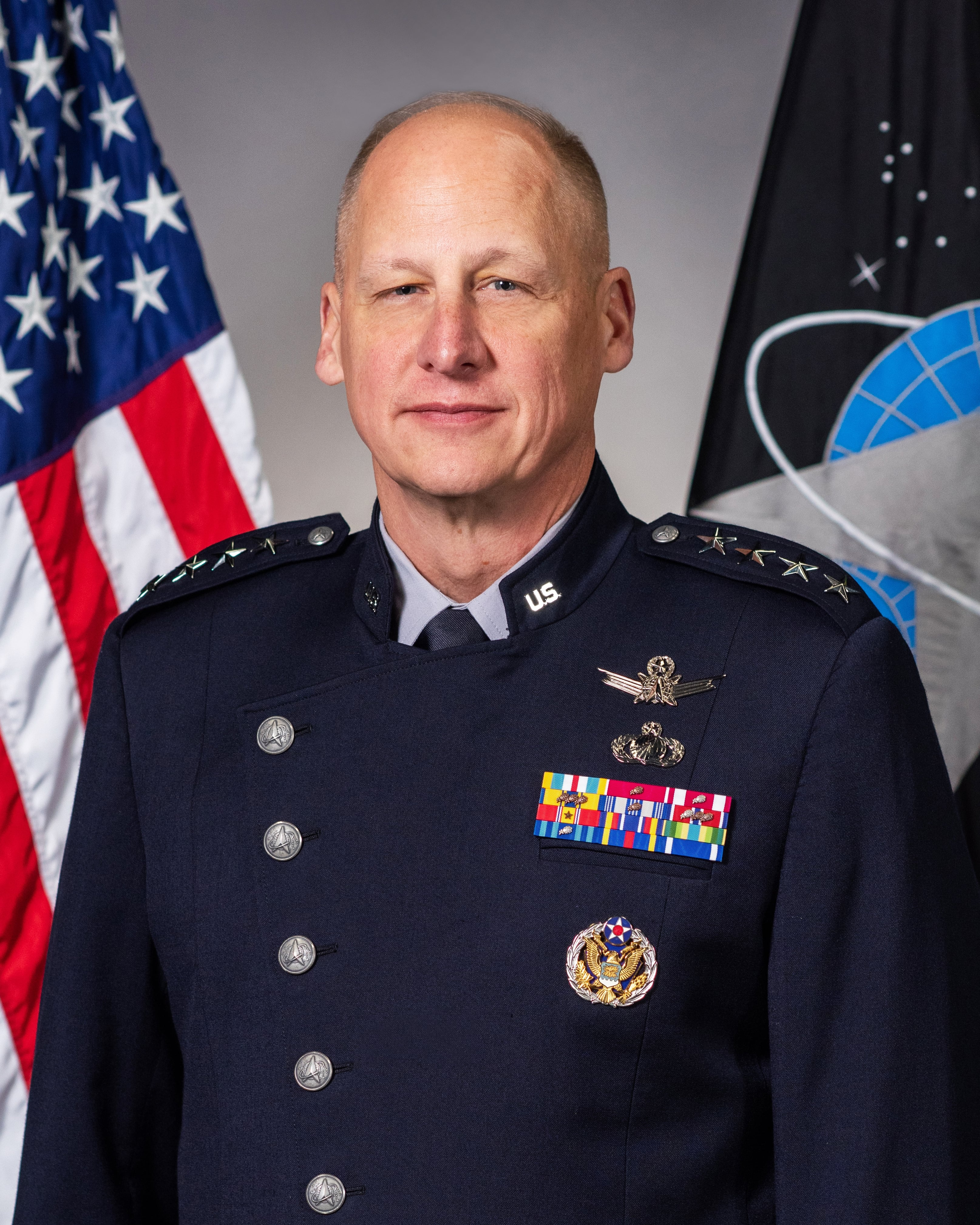
- Official portrait, 2024
- Born: November 22, 1967 (age 58); Owasso, Oklahoma, U.S.
- Education: Oklahoma State University (BS): Wright State University (MBA); George Washington University
- Spouse: Rachel Guetlein
- Children: 4
- Military career
- Allegiance: United States
- Branch: United States Air Force: United States Space Force
- Service years: 1991–2021 (Air Force): 2021–present (Space Force)
- Rank: General
- Commands: Office of Golden Dome for America: Vice Chief of Space Operations; Space Systems Command; Space Force Element to the National Reconnaissance Office; Remote Sensing Systems Directorate; Space-Based Infrared System Production Division; Rapid Reaction Squadron
- Awards: Defense Distinguished Service Medal: Air Force Distinguished Service Medal; Defense Superior Service Medal; Legion of Merit (2)

Michael Anthony Guetlein (born November 22, 1967) is a United States Space Force general who serves as the direct reporting program manager of the Office of Golden Dome for America. He recently served as the second vice chief of space operations from 2023 to 2025. He previously served as the deputy director of the National Reconnaissance Office from 2019 to 2021 and as the first commander of Space Systems Command from 2021 to 2023.

Guetlein was born and raised in Oklahoma. He joined the United States Air Force in 1991 after graduating from the Oklahoma State University. He is a career acquisitions officer who has worked in special operations, global power projection, missile warning and detection, and counterspace programs. He has commanded the Rapid Reaction Squadron at Peterson Air Force Base, Colorado, and the Space Force Element to the National Reconnaissance Office. He has also led Space and Missile Systems Center's Space-Based Infrared System Production Division and Remote Sensing Systems Directorate.

Guetlein transferred to the Space Force in 2021 while serving as NRO deputy director. In the same year, he became the inaugural commander of Space Systems Command. In 2023, he was nominated and confirmed for promotion to general and appointment as vice chief of space operations.

== Early life and education ==
Guetlein was born on November 22, 1967. He comes from a military family from Oklahoma. His father and grandfather both served in the United States Army, the latter serving during World War II.

Guetlein graduated with a B.S. degree in mechanical aerospace engineering in 1991 from Oklahoma State University. In 1995, he received an MBA from the Wright State University. He also received a Master's degree in organizational management from the George Washington University in 1999 and a Master's in national security and policy making from the Naval War College. He also went to the Air War College. In 2011, he was part of the Secretary of Defense Corporate Fellowship Program at SpaceX.

== Military career ==
=== Air Force ===
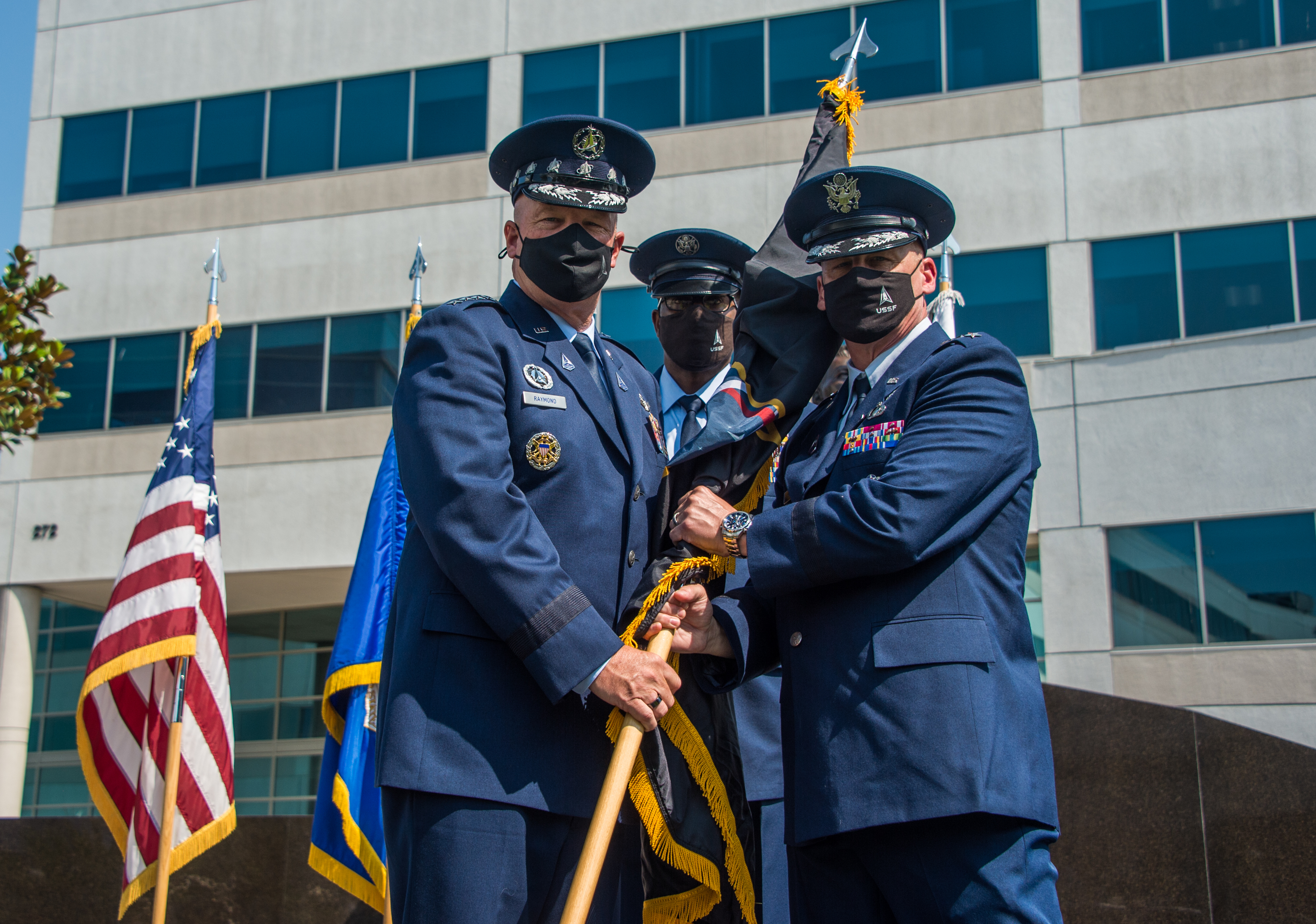
Guetlein (right) accepts the Space Systems Command flag from Gen John W. Raymond (left) during the SSC activation ceremony, 2021

As early as he was three years old, Guetlein wanted to be in the United States Air Force.

Guetlein entered the Air Force on May 11, 1991, after earning his commission as a second lieutenant from the Oklahoma State University's Air Force Reserve Officer Training Corps program. From 1991 to 1993, he served at Wright-Patterson Air Force Base, Ohio, starting as an AC-130U gunship support manager at the Special Operations Program Office for two years. He then went on to serve as chief of B-2 bomber propulsion at the B-2 Program Office until 1994. After that, he served as executive officer at the Engineering Directorate from 1994 to 1996.

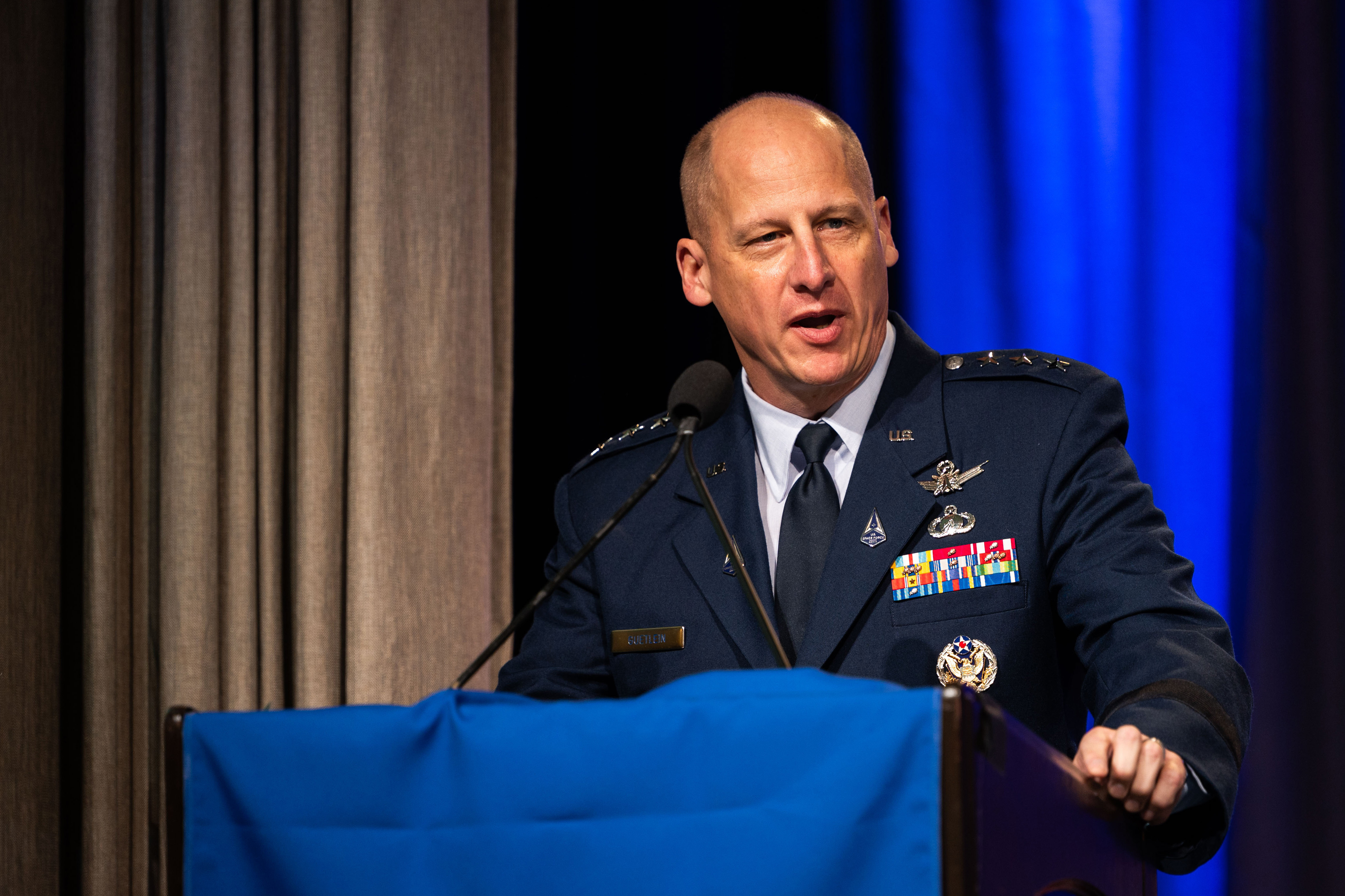
Guetlein speaking at the inaugural Space Force Ball, 2021

From 1996 to 1997, Guetlein was stationed at Hurlburt Field, Florida, first serving as an AC-130U gunship sortie generation flight commander for the 4th Aircraft Maintenance Unit for six months. He then served AC-130H gunship flight commander for the 16th Aircraft Maintenance Unit. He was then assigned at the Pentagon as an intern at the Air Force headquarters, while he was studying at the George Washington University.

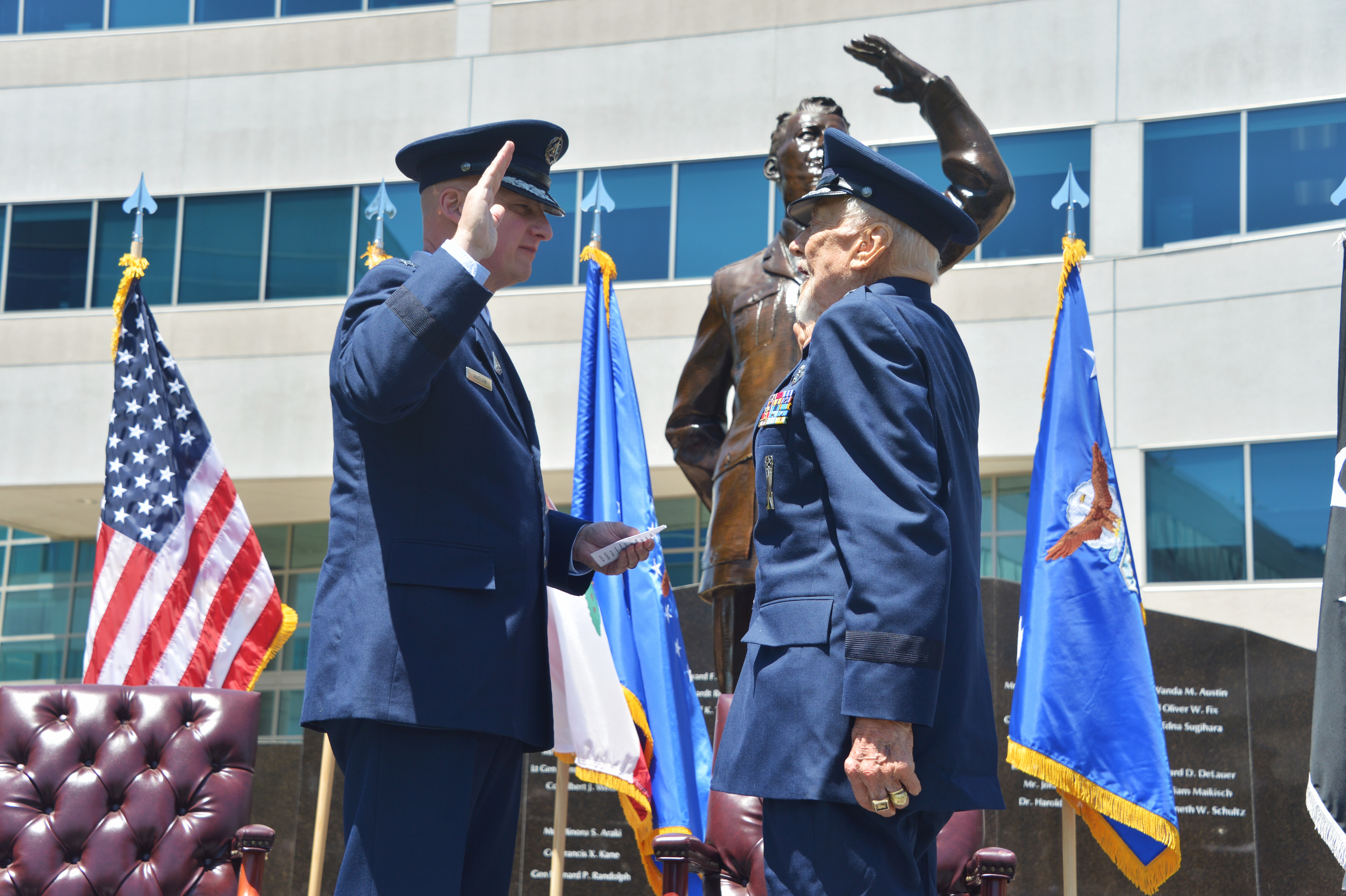
Guetlein (left) promotes Buzz Aldrin to brigadier general, 2023

In 1999, Guetlein moved to Los Angeles Air Force Base, California, where he was assigned until 2004. From 1999 to 2002, he served as deputy program manager of the Space-Based Infrared System Ground Segment. He then served as director for Missile Warning Systems for a year. Afterwards, he served as executive officer.

From 2005 to 2008, Guetlein was assigned at the Pentagon. First, he served as the counterspace program element monitor for over a year. He then served as a military assistant to the assistant secretary of the Air Force for Acquisition from 2006 to 2008. After his stint at the Pentagon, he served as commander of the Rapid Reaction Squadron at Peterson Air Force Base, Colorado, from 2008 to 2010.

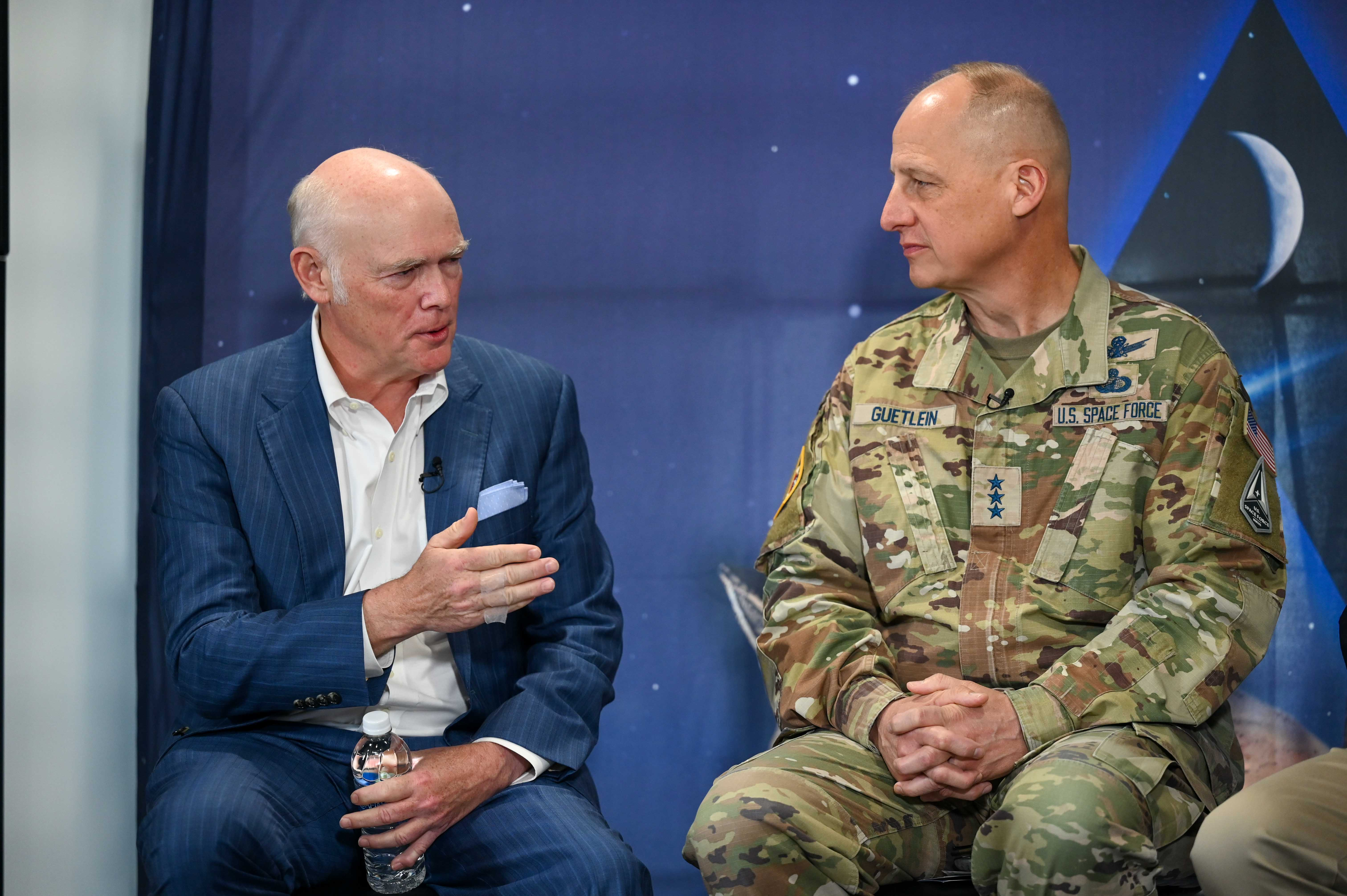
Guetlein (right) with United Launch Alliance CEO, Tory Bruno (left), 2023

After that, Guetlein went back to Los Angeles, serving as Secretary of Defense Corporate Fellow at SpaceX for a year. From 2011 to 2014, he served as senior materiel leader of the Space-Based Infrared System Production Division at the Space and Missile Systems Center (SMC). He then served as director of the Remote Sensing Systems Directorate from 2014 to 2017, during which time he was promoted to brigadier general.

From 2017 to 2019, Guetlein served as program executive officer for programs and integration at the Missile Defense Agency in Redstone Arsenal, Alabama. On July 9, 2019, Guetlein became deputy director of the National Reconnaissance Office (NRO). As deputy director, he also served as commander of the Air Force element to the NRO.

=== Space Force ===
In 2021, Guetlein transferred into the Space Force. He was nominated for promotion to lieutenant general and appointment as commander of Space Systems Command. In July 2023, Guetlein was nominated for promotion to general and appointment as vice chief of space operations. He was confirmed on December 19, 2023. On December 21, 2023, he was promoted to general and assumed the position of VCSO, becoming only the second person to do so. On May 20, 2025 President Trump nominated General Guetlein for appointment as the Program Manager for the newly initiated Golden Dome missile defense initiative. His nomination was sent to the Senate on June 16, 2025.

== Personal life ==
Guetlein is an outdoor enthusiast. He likes hiking, camping, the beach, and wine tasting.

== Awards and decorations ==
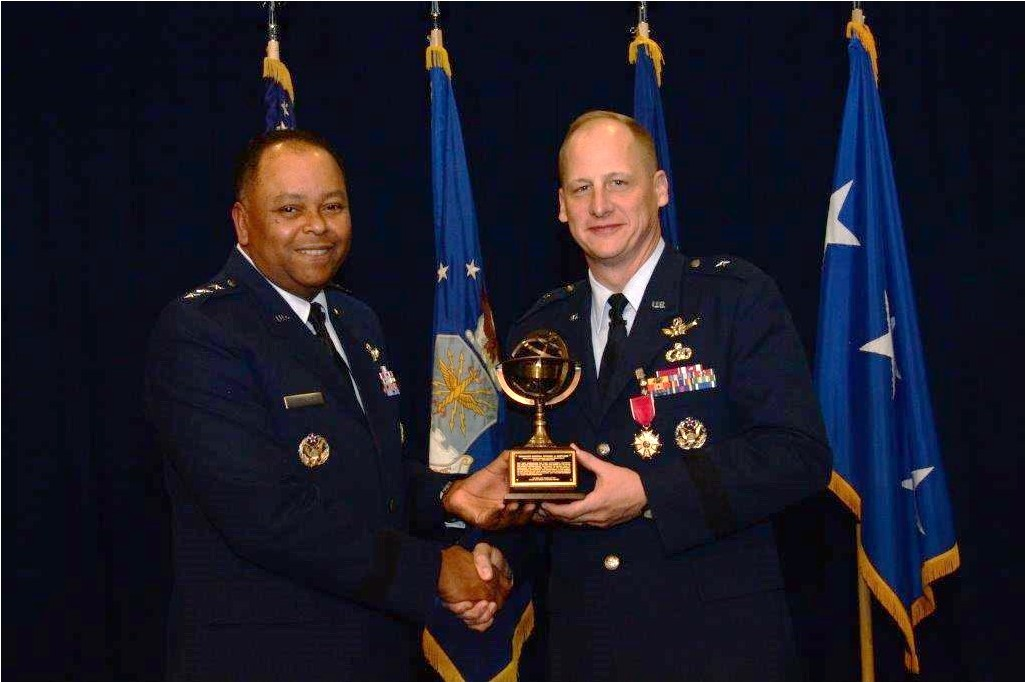
Lt Gen Greaves presents an award to Guetlein, 2016

Guetlein is the recipient of the following awards:

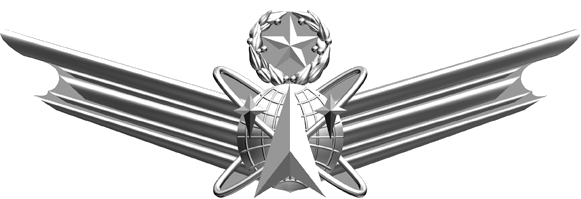
Command Space Operations Badge

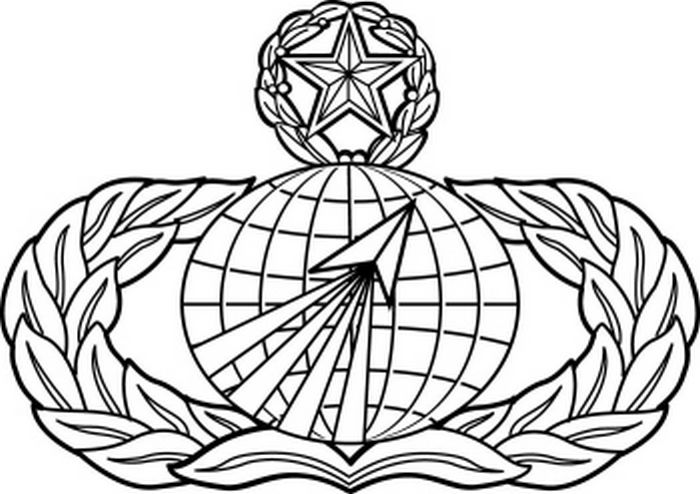

Air Force Master Acquisition and Financial Management Badge

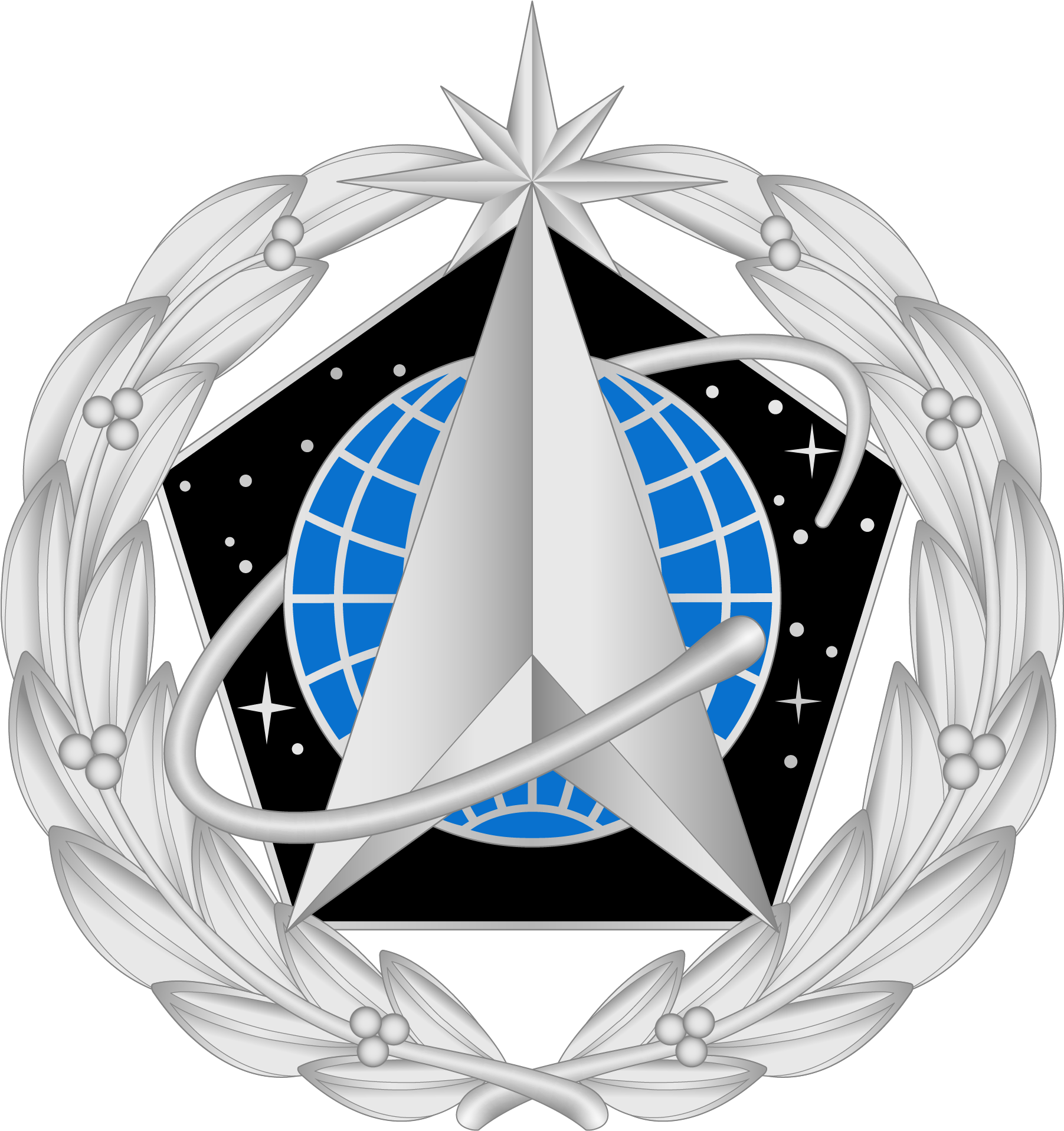

Space Staff Badge

Air Staff Badge

Defense Distinguished Service Medal
Air Force Distinguished Service Medal
Defense Superior Service Medal
Legion of Merit with one bronze oak leaf cluster
Meritorious Service Medal with one bronze oak leaf cluster
Air Force Commendation Medal with three bronze oak leaf clusters
Air Force Achievement Medal with one bronze oak leaf cluster
Air Force Organizational Excellence Award with one silver and two bronze oak leaf clusters
National Defense Service Medal with one bronze service star
Global War on Terrorism Service Medal
Armed Forces Service Medal
Air Force Longevity Service Award with one silver oak leaf cluster
Air Force Training Ribbon
NATO Medal (Yugoslavia)

== Dates of promotion ==
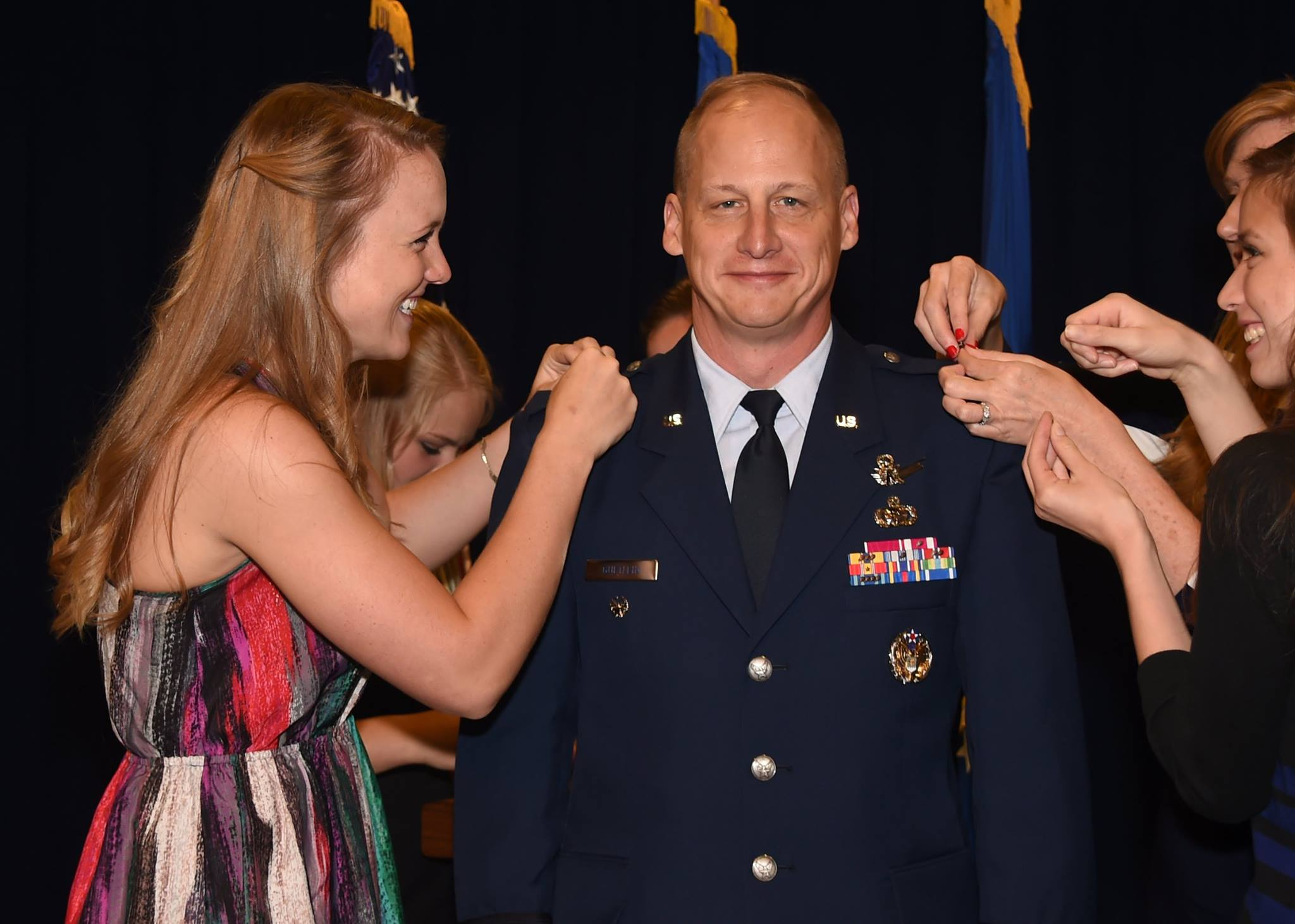
Guetlein's family pins on his first star during his promotion ceremony to brigadier general, 2016

Rank	Branch	Date
Second Lieutenant	Air Force	May 11, 1991
First Lieutenant	Air Force	July 20, 1993
Captain	Air Force	July 20, 1995
Major	Air Force	June 1, 2002
Lieutenant Colonel	Air Force	March 1, 2006
Colonel	Air Force	October 1, 2010
Brigadier General	Air Force	July 22, 2016
Major General	Air Force	September 24, 2019
Major General	Space Force	~April 29, 2021
Lieutenant General	Space Force	August 13, 2021
General	Space Force	December 21, 2023

== Writings ==
- Lethal Autonomous Weapons — Ethical and Doctrinal Implications (PDF) (M.S.). Naval War College. February 14, 2005. Archived (PDF) from the original on November 2, 2021.

Military offices
New office	Director of the Remote Sensing Systems Directorate; 2014–2017	Succeeded by Dennis Bythewood
Preceded by William T. Cooley	Program Executive for Programs and Integration of the Missile Defense Agency; 2017–2019	Succeeded by Philip Garrant
Preceded by Mark Baird	Deputy Director of the National Reconnaissance Office; 2019–2021	Succeeded by Donna D. Shipton
New command	Commander of Space Systems Command; 2021–2023	Succeeded by Philip Garrant
Preceded by David D. Thompson	Vice Chief of Space Operations; 2023–2025	Succeeded by Shawn Bratton
New office	Direct Reporting Program Manager of the Office of Golden Dome for America; 2025–present	Incumbent
