= Philip Garrant =

U.S. Space Force general

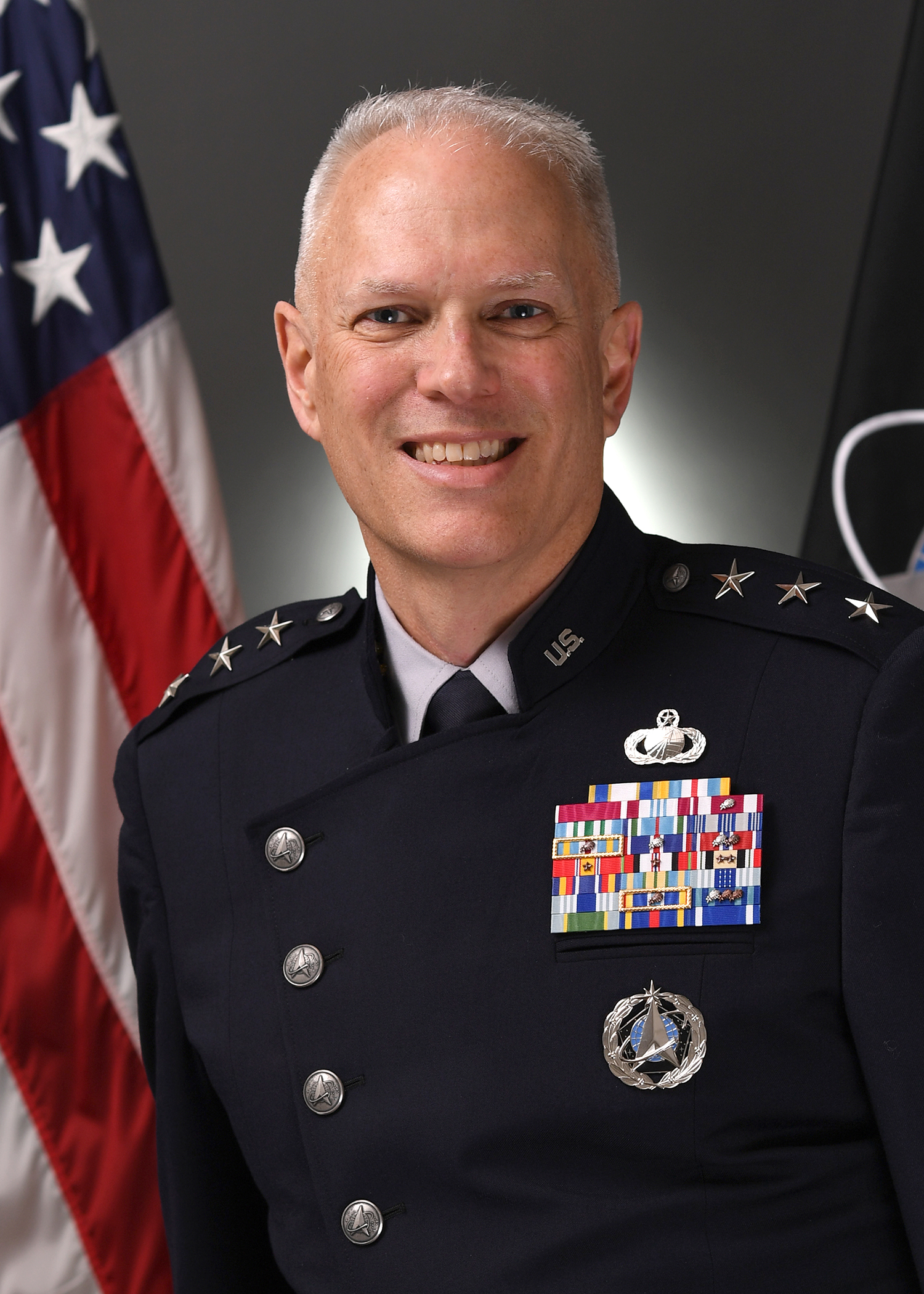
- Official portrait, 2024
- Born: c. 1969 (age 56–57); Hanover, Maryland, U.S.
- Alma mater: Johns Hopkins University (BS): Capitol College (MS)
- Spouse: Heather Garrant
- Military career
- Allegiance: United States
- Branch: United States Air Force: United States Space Force
- Service years: 1991–2021 (Air Force): 2021–present (Space Force)
- Rank: Lieutenant General
- Commands: Space Systems Command: Space Superiority Systems Directorate; Evolved Expendable Launch Vehicle Systems Division; 689th Armament Systems Squadron
- Conflicts: War in Afghanistan; Iraq War
- Awards: Air Force Distinguished Service Medal: Defense Superior Service Medal; Legion of Merit

Signature
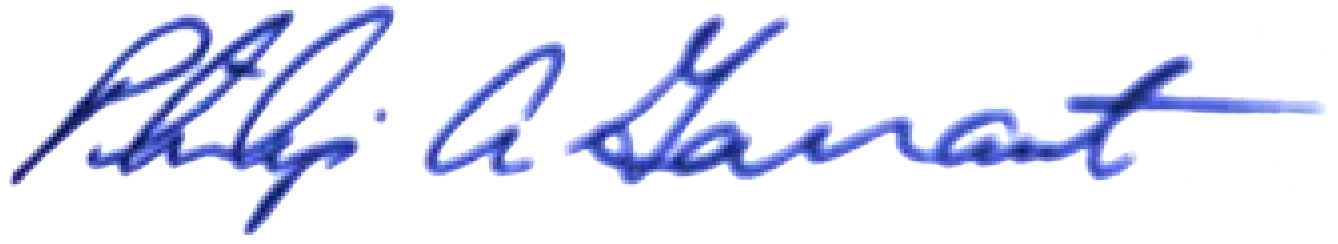

Philip Alan Garrant (born c. 1969) is a United States Space Force lieutenant general who serves as the second commander of Space Systems Command. He previously served as the deputy chief of space operations for strategy, plans, programs, and requirements.

Garrant received his commission from the Air Force Reserve Officer Training Corps program at the Johns Hopkins University in 1991. He is a career acquisitions officer who has led the 689th Armament Systems Squadron, Evolved Expendable Launch Vehicle Systems Division, and Space Superiority Systems Directorate. He was deployed in support of the Iraq War and the war in Afghanistan.

In 2021, Garrant transferred to the Space Force. He was promoted to lieutenant general and appointed as the second chief strategy and resourcing officer. In 2024, he took command of Space Systems Command.

== Early life and education ==
Philip Alan Garrant is the son of Richard and Martha Garrant of Hanover, Maryland. His father is a United States Army officer and his mother is a school teacher. He has a brother who is a reservist in the United States Navy while working for the United States Department of Defense. He finished high school in 1987 at Meade Senior High School.

Garrant received a B.S. in electrical engineering in 1991 from the Johns Hopkins University. He later earned M.S. degrees in systems management and systems engineering from Capitol College and Air Force Institute of Technology, respectively. He also attended the Air War College, Army War College, University of North Carolina, and Center for Creative Leadership.

== Military career ==
=== Air Force ===
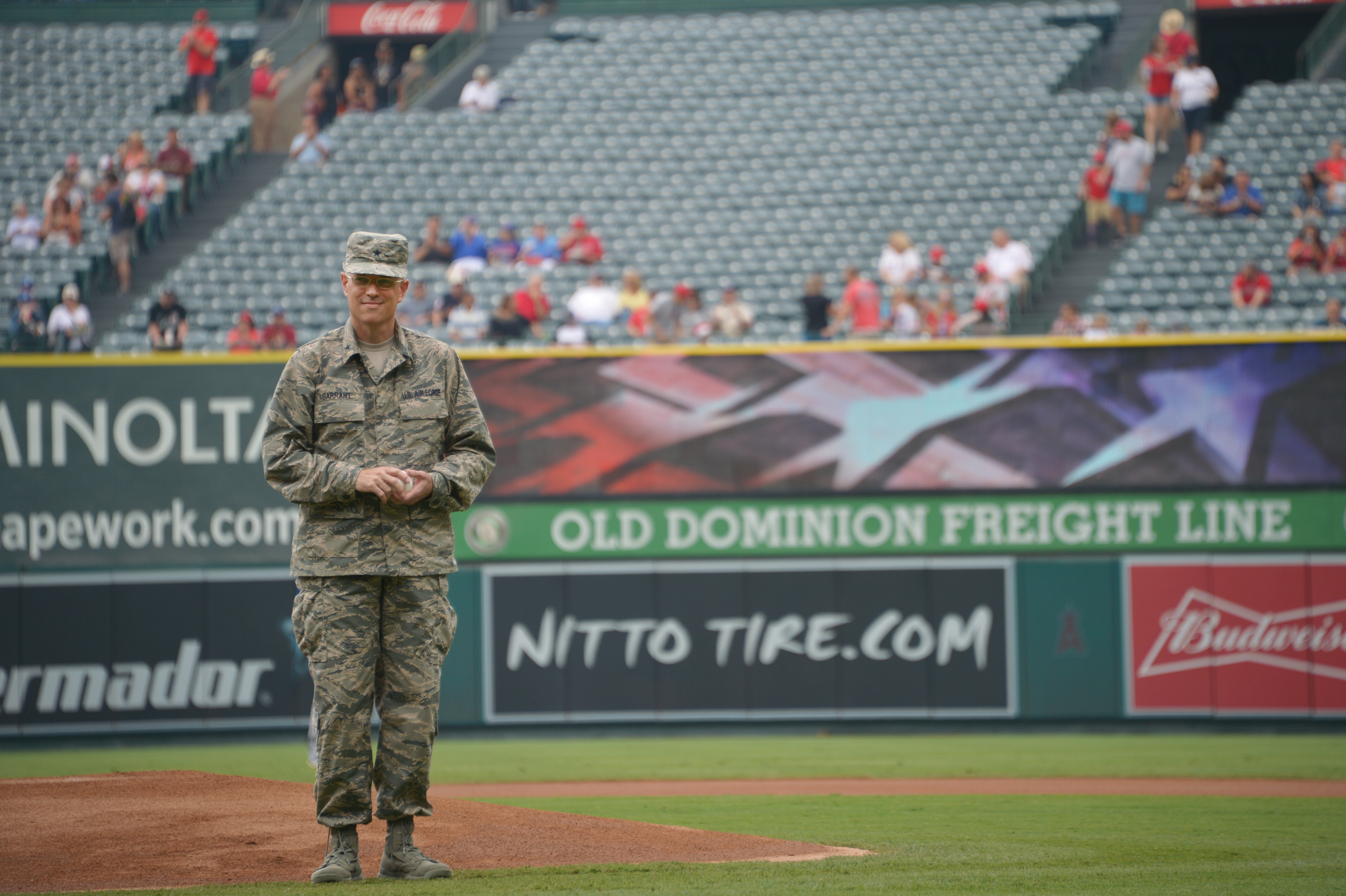
Garrant served the ceremonial first pitch during a Los Angeles Angels baseball game, 2017

Garrant commissioned into the United States Air Force on 23 May 1991, through an Air Force Reserve Officer Training Corps program at the University of Maryland. His first assignment was as systems engineer and program manager at the National Security Agency's Document and Data Networks Division for three years in Fort Meade, Maryland. From 1995 to 1995, he served as a systems engineer then program manager at a classified location.

In 1999, Garrant deployed to Ramstein Air Base, Germany, as an air combat training manager at United States Air Forces in Europe (USAFE). He served two years in that position until he was assigned as executive officer to the director of air and space operations of USAFE. After that, he served as program manager of the F-16 Structures Branch at the Ogden Air Logistics Center in Hill Air Force Base, Utah, for a year.

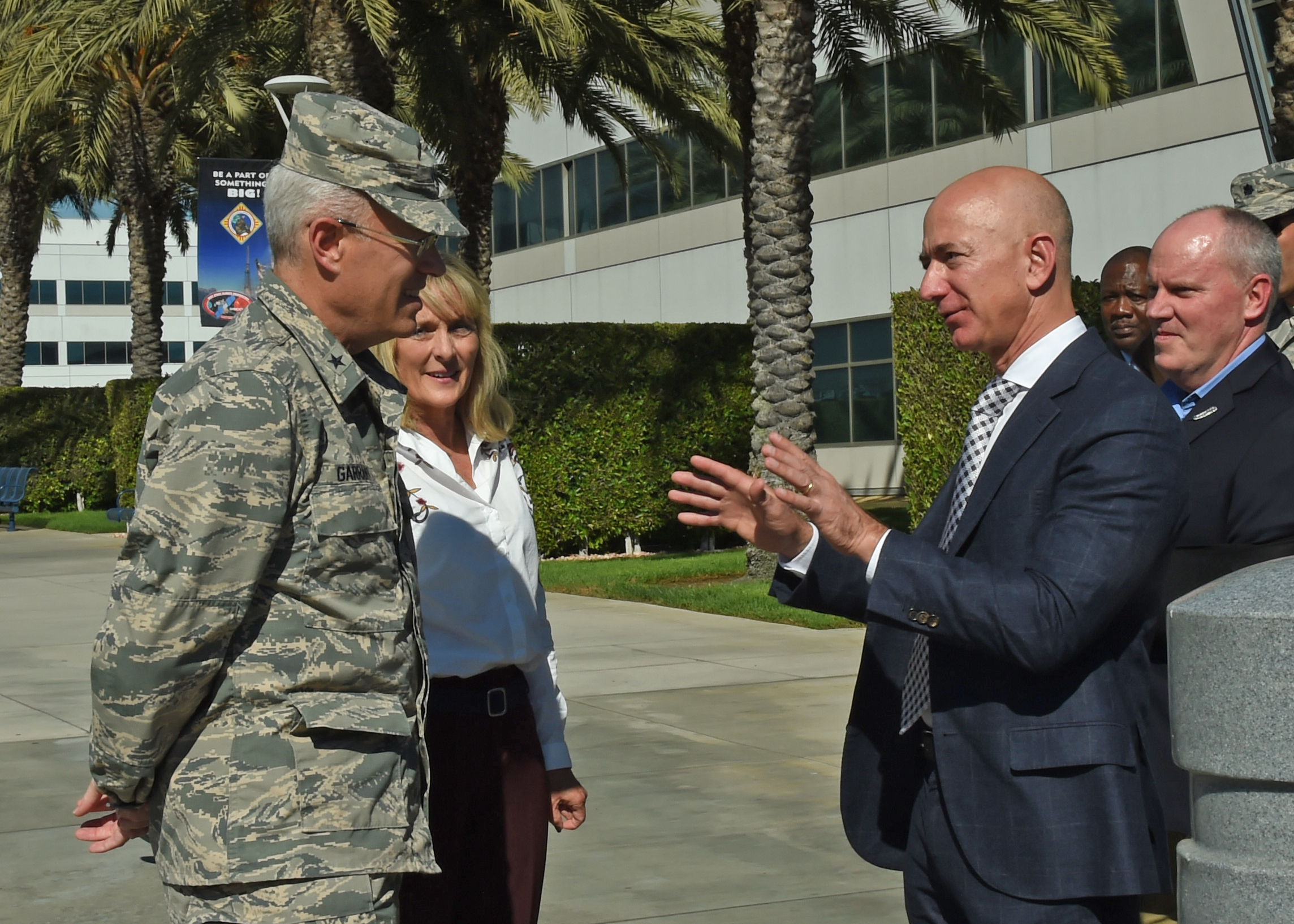
Garrant welcomes Jeff Bezos to the Space and Missile Systems Center, 2017

After studying at the Air Force Institute of Technology, Garrant served as chief of the Advanced Sensors Branch at the Office of the Assistant Secretary of the Air Force for Acquisition at Rosslyn, Virginia, from 2004 to 2006. After that, he transferred as the chief of the Predator, Reaper, and Big Safari Programs Branch for a year.

In June 2007, Garrant took command of the 689th Armament Systems Squadron of the Air Armament Center at Eglin Air Force Base, Florida. He was in command of the squadron for two years until he deployed to Camp Victory, Iraq, as a C-8 acquisition liaison officer for the Multi-National Corps – Iraq from July 2008 to January 2009. After that, he went back to Eglin as deputy director of the 808th Armament Systems Group until 2010.

From 2011 to 2014, Garrant served as senior materiel leader of the Evolved Expendable Launch Vehicle Systems Division of the Space and Missile Systems Center (SMC) at Los Angeles Air Force Base, California. After that he deployed to Kabul, Afghanistan, and Al Udeid Air Base, Qatar, from October 2013 to April 2014 as deputy director for regional teams for operational contract support and chief of audit readiness in support of the Afghanistan war.

After his deployment, Garrant went back to SMC, serving as the director of the Space Superiority Systems Directorate from 2014 to 2017. After that, he served as the deputy commander of SMC and the deputy Air Force program executive officer for space. During this time, he was also promoted to brigadier general. In 2019, he was assigned to the Missile Defense Agency (MDA) at Redstone Arsenal, Alabama, as the program executive for ground-based weapon systems. He promoted to major general in 2020.

=== Space Force ===
In April 2021, while assigned at the MDA, Garrant was nominated for transfer into the United States Space Force. He was among the first cadre of Air Force general officers who were nominated to transfer into the Space Force. He transferred to the new service in June 2021.

In June 2022, Garrant was nominated for promotion to lieutenant general and appointment as the deputy chief of space operations for strategy, plans, programs, and requirements. On August 2, 2022, he was promoted to lieutenant general and replaced Lieutenant General William Liquori as the Space Force's second chief strategy and resourcing officer. As the service's chief strategy and resourcing officer, he has overall responsibility for the strategies, requirements, and budget of the Space Force. He led the Space Force's first space engagement talks (SET) with the Japan Air Self-Defense Force in 2023.

In July 2023, Garrant was nominated for appointment as commander of the Space Systems Command (SSC), the successor organization of SMC. He would replace Lieutenant General Michael Guetlein who was selected to serve as vice chief of space operations. His nomination were among the hundreds of military promotions held by Senator Tommy Tuberville in opposition of the Department of Defense's abortion policy. He was confirmed in December 2023. On 1 February 2024, he became the second commander of Space Systems Command.

== Personal life ==
His wife, Heather, is a local school nurse. He has four children, three sons and a daughter, two of whom work for the Air Force as civilians.

== Awards and decorations ==
Garrant is the recipient of the following awards:

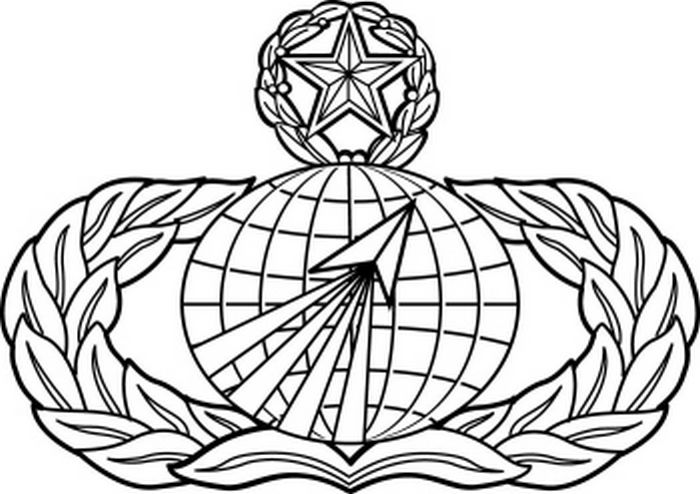

Air Force Master Acquisition and Financial Management Badge

Air Force Operations Support Badge

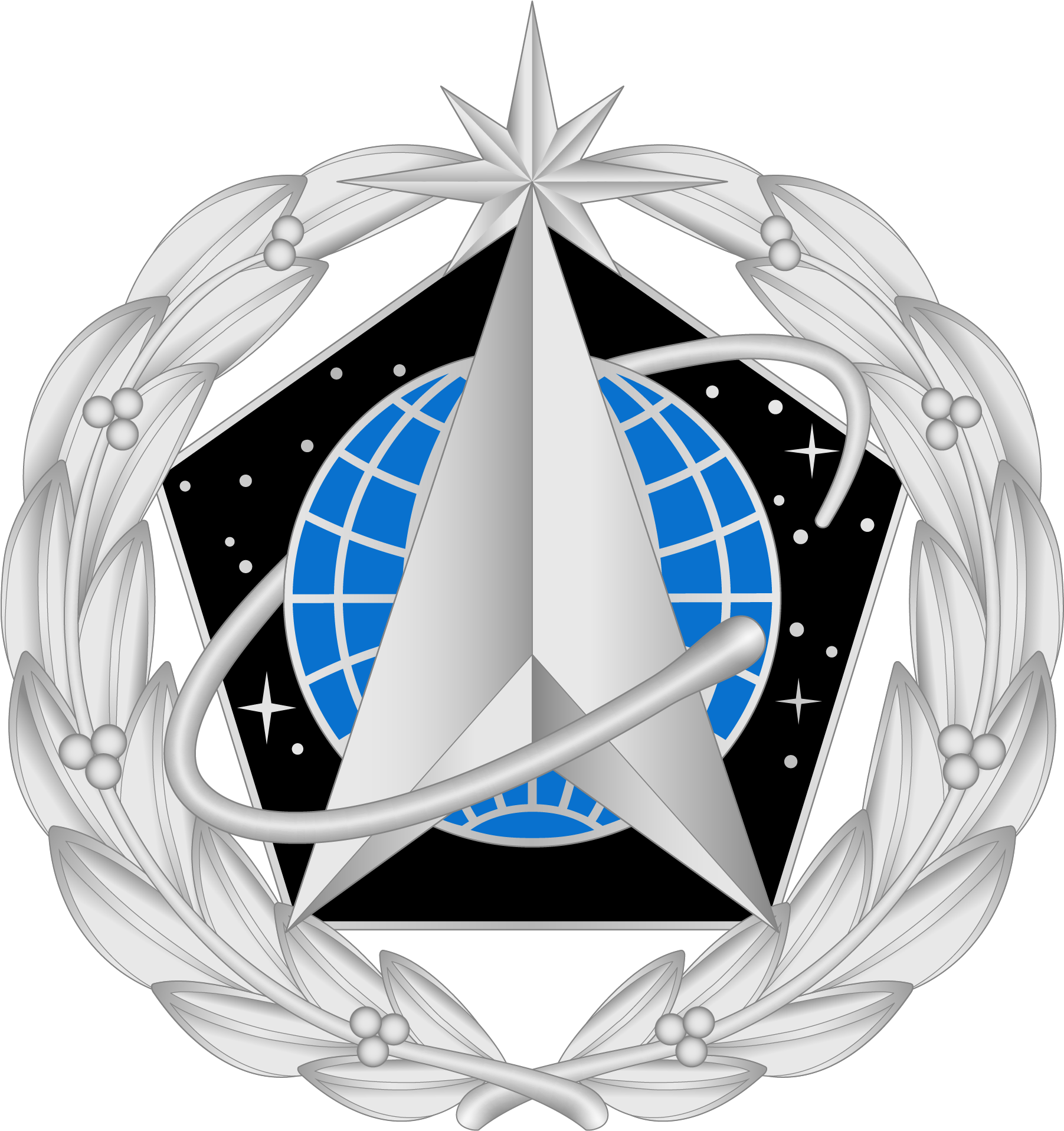

Space Staff Badge

Air Force Distinguished Service Medal
Defense Superior Service Medal
Legion of Merit
Meritorious Service Medal
Meritorious Service Medal with one silver oak leaf cluster
Joint Service Commendation Medal
Joint Service Achievement Medal
Air Force Achievement Medal
Joint Meritorious Unit Award with one bronze oak leaf cluster
Air Force Outstanding Unit Award with one silver oak leaf cluster
Air Force Organizational Excellence Award with one silver and one bronze oak leaf clusters
National Defense Service Medal with one bronze service stars
Afghanistan Campaign Medal with one bronze service star
Iraq Campaign Medal with two bronze service stars
Global War on Terrorism Service Medal
Outstanding Volunteer Service Medal
Air Force Overseas Short Tour Service Ribbon
Air Force Overseas Long Tour Service Ribbon
Air Force Expeditionary Service Ribbon with gold frame and one bronze oak leaf cluster
Air Force Longevity Service Award with one silver and two bronze oak leaf clusters
Air Force Small Arms Expert Marksmanship Ribbon
Air Force Training Ribbon
NATO Medal (Yugoslavia)

== Dates of promotion ==
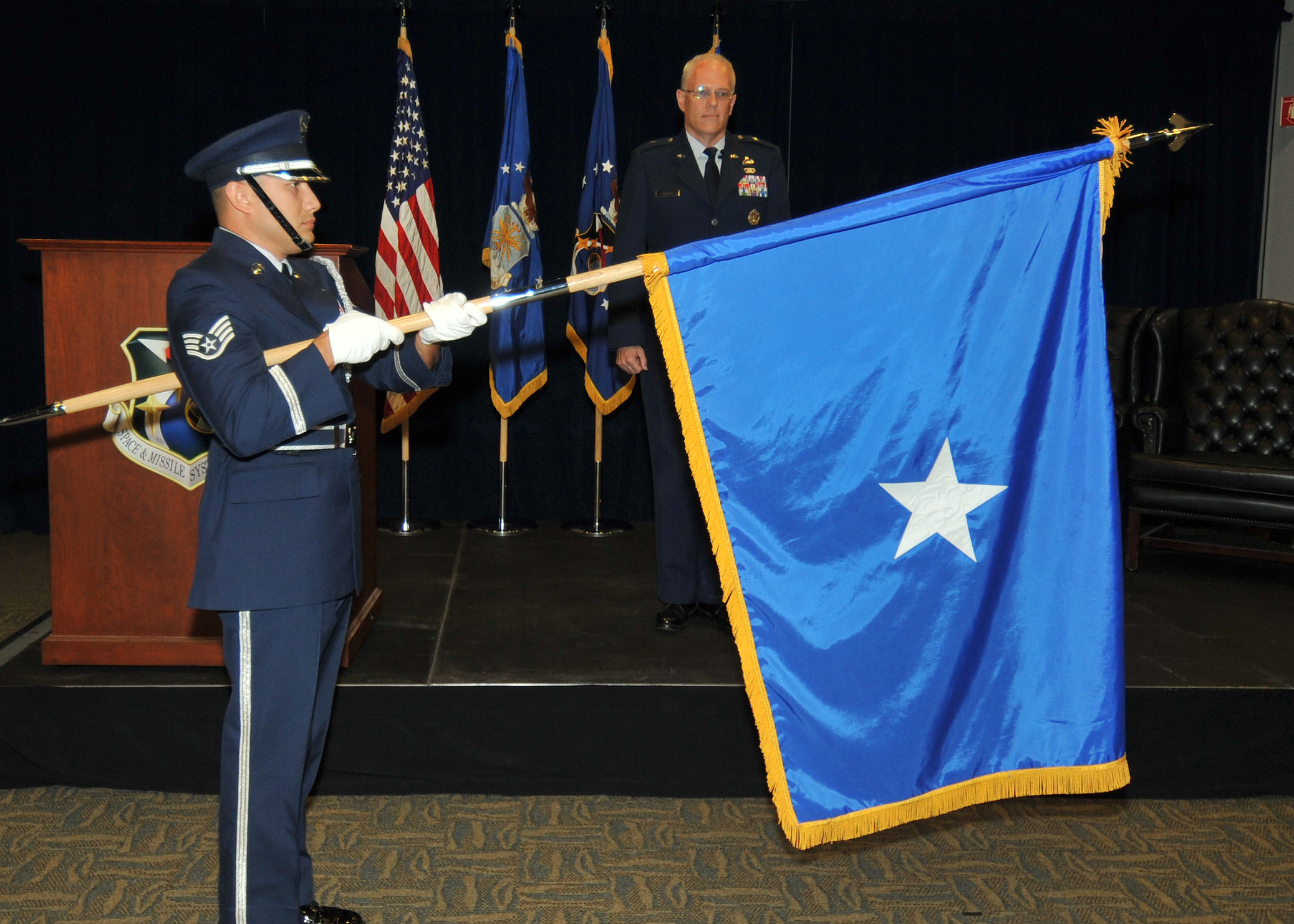
Garrant during a promotion ceremony to brigadier general in 2017

Rank	Branch	Date
Second Lieutenant	Air Force	23 May 1991
First Lieutenant	Air Force	19 October 1993
Captain	Air Force	19 October 1995
Major	Air Force	1 August 2002
Lieutenant Colonel	Air Force	1 December 2006
Colonel	Air Force	1 September 2011
Brigadier General	Air Force	2 August 2017
Major General	Air Force	22 May 2020
Major General	Space Force	~29 April 2021
Lieutenant General	Space Force	2 August 2022

== Writings ==
- What are the Lessons from using Airpower in Counterinsurgencies? (PDF) (Thesis). United States Army War College. March 18, 2011.

Military offices
Preceded by Mark Baird	Director of the Space Superiority Systems Directorate; 2014–2017	Succeeded by Stephen G. Purdy
Preceded by Mark Baird	Vice Commander of the Space and Missile Systems Center; 2017–2019	Succeeded by Donna D. Shipton
Preceded by Michael Guetlein	Program Executive for Ground-based Weapon Systems of the Missile Defense Agency; 2019–2022	Succeeded by Heath A. Collins
Preceded by William Liquori	Deputy Chief of Space Operations for Strategy, Plans, Programs, and Requirements; 2022–2023	Succeeded by Shawn Bratton
Preceded by Michael Guetlein	Commander of Space Systems Command; 2024–present	Incumbent
