= Stephen G. Purdy =

U.S. Space Force general

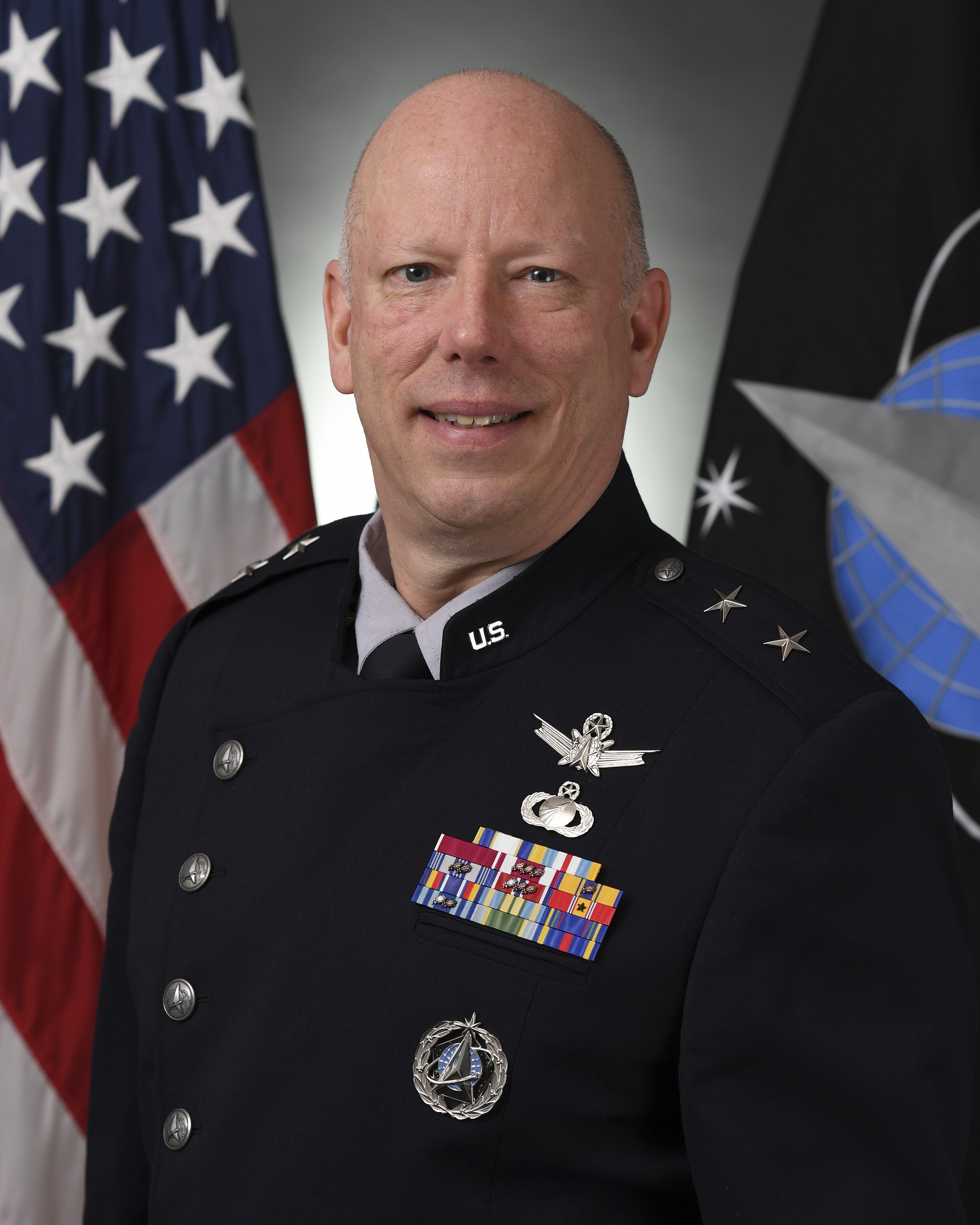
- Official portrait, 2026
- Born: c. 1971 (age 54–55)
- Alma mater: Baylor University (BS, MS): George Washington University (MA)
- Spouse: Wendy
- Relatives: Stephen Purdy Sr. (father)
- Military career
- Allegiance: United States
- Branch: United States Air Force: United States Space Force
- Service years: 1993–2021 (Air Force): 2021–present (Space Force)
- Rank: Major General
- Commands: Assured Access to Space Directorate: Space Launch Delta 45; Eastern Range; Space Superiority Systems Directorate
- Awards: Defense Superior Service Medal: Legion of Merit

Stephen G. Purdy Jr. (born c. 1971) is a United States Space Force major general who serves as the military deputy to the assistant secretary of the Air Force for space acquisition and integration. He previously served as commander of Space Launch Delta 45, program executive officer for assured access to space, director of the Eastern Range, and director of launch and range operations of Space Systems Command.

== Education ==
- 1993 Bachelor of Science, Engineering (Computer Emphasis), Baylor University, Texas
- 1995 Master of Science, Computer Science, Baylor University, Texas
- 1999 Distinguished Graduate, Squadron Officer School, Maxwell Air Force Base, Ala.
- 2001 Master of Arts, Organizational Management, The George Washington University, Washington, D.C.
- 2006 Congressional Fellow, Air Force Legislative Fellows Program, U.S. Senate, Washington, D.C.
- 2010 Certificate in Legislative Studies, Georgetown University, Government Affairs Institute, Washington, D.C.
- 2010 Program Managers Course (PMT 401), Defense Acquisition University, Fort Belvoir, Va.
- 2014 Master of Science, National Security Strategy, National War College, National Defense University, Washington, D.C.
- 2014 Executive Program Managers Course (PMT 402), Defense Acquisition University, Fort Belvoir, Va.
- 2017 Leadership Development Program, Center for Creative Leadership, Greensboro, N.C.
- 2019 Executive Leadership Seminar, University of North Carolina, Chapel Hill

== Military career ==
In September 2022, Purdy was nominated for promotion to major general.

=== Assignments ===
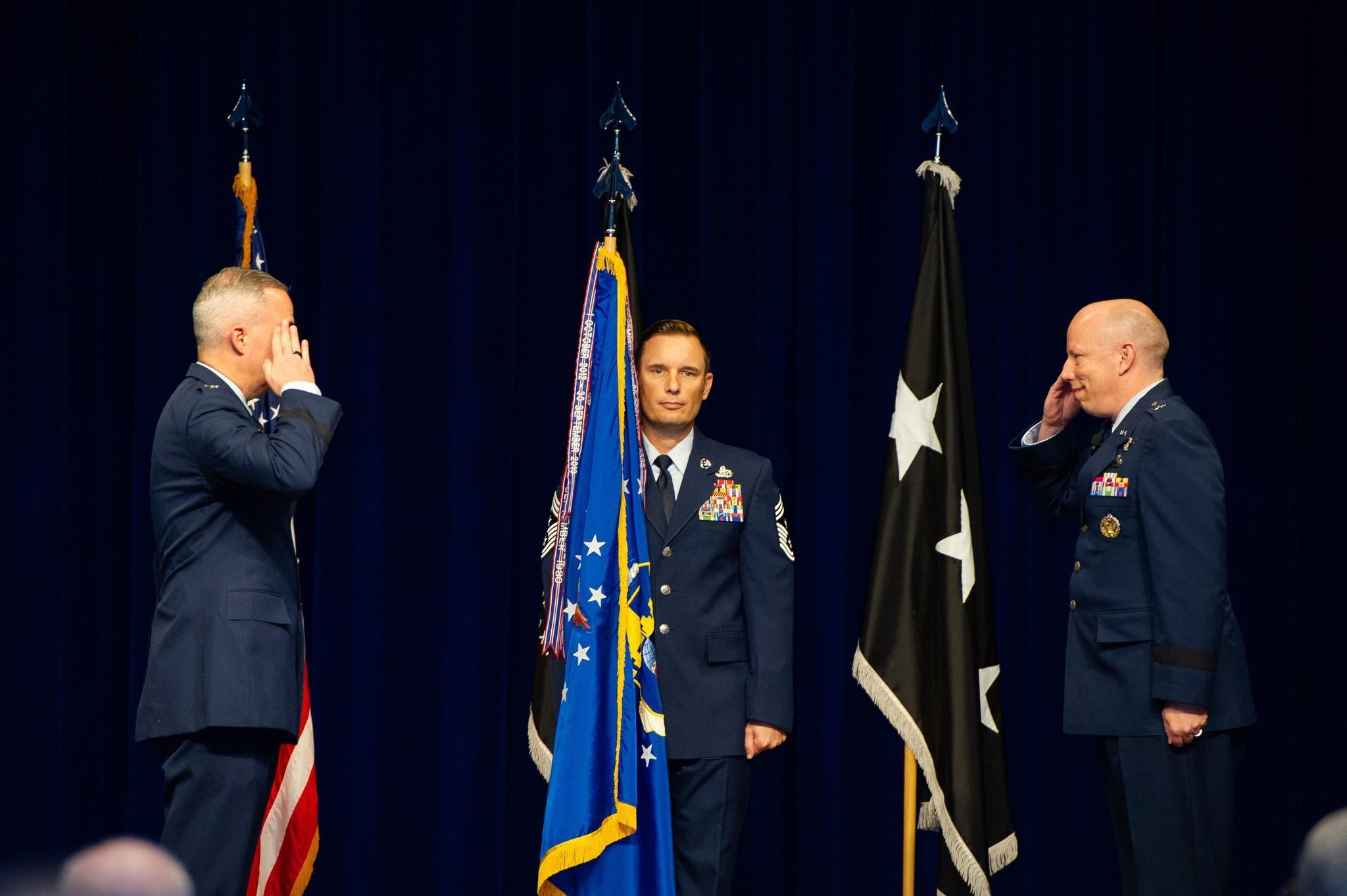
Purdy assumed command of the 45th Space Wing in 2021

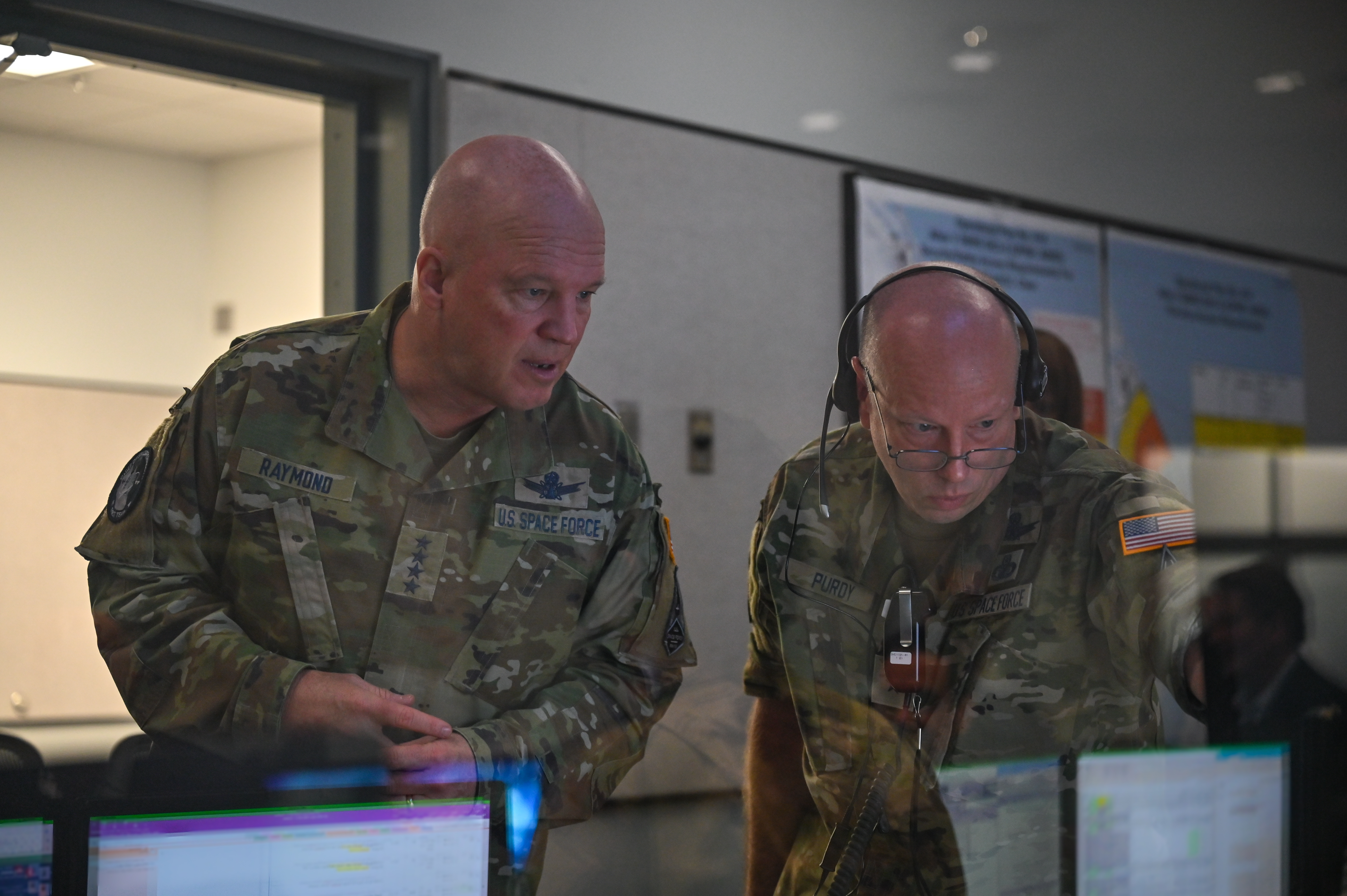
Purdy talks with Gen Raymond, 2021

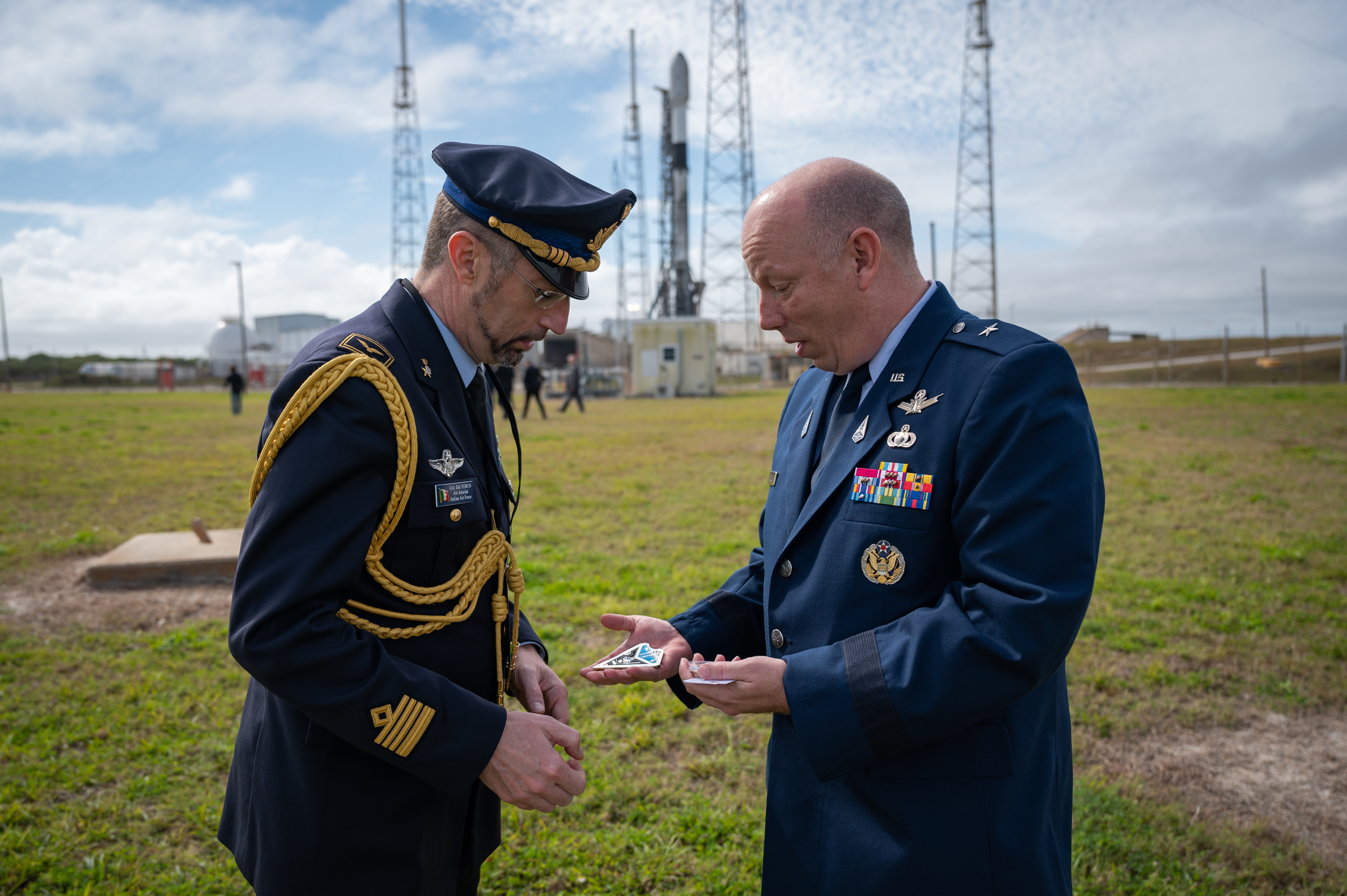
Purdy tours an Italian Air Force Attaché at Cape Canaveral Space Launch Complex 40, 2022

1. September 1995 – December 1997, Simulation Systems Engineer, Wright Laboratory, Wright-Patterson Air Force Base, Ohio
2. January 1998 – July 1999, Executive Officer, Air Vehicles Directorate, Air Force Research Laboratory, Wright-Patterson AFB, Ohio
3. August 1999 – May 2001, Air Force Intern, the Pentagon, Arlington, Va. (January 2000 – June 2000, Intern, Nuclear Matters, Deputy Assistant to the Secretary of Defense, Office of the Secretary of Defense, Washington D.C.; June 2000 – December 2000, Intern, Space Programs, Assistant Secretary of the Air Force for Acquisition, Headquarters U.S. Air Force, the Pentagon, Arlington, Va.)
4. June 2001 – December 2001, Chief, Atlas V Booster, Evolved Expendable Launch Vehicle Program, Los Angeles AFB, Calif.
5. January 2002 – May 2003, Chief, Atlas V Avionics, Evolved Expendable Launch Vehicle Program, Los Angeles AFB, Calif.
6. June 2003 – March 2004, Chief Engineer, Atlas V, Evolved Expendable Launch Vehicle Program, Los Angeles AFB, Calif.
7. March 2004 – July 2005, Joint Counterair Manager, Global Power Programs, Assistant Secretary of the Air Force for Acquisition, Headquarters U.S. Air Force, the Pentagon, Arlington, Va.
8. August 2005 – December 2006, Fellow, Air Force Congressional Legislative Fellows Program, Headquarters U.S. Air Force, the Pentagon, Arlington, Va. (Defense Fellow for United States Senator Pete V. Domenici, State of New Mexico).
9. January 2007 – December 2007, Deputy, Congressional Appropriations Strategy and Engagement Division, Congressional Budget and Appropriations Office, Deputy Assistant Secretary of the Air Force (Budget), Headquarters U.S. Air Force, the Pentagon, Arlington, Va.
10. January 2008 – August 2008, Chief, Congressional Appropriations Strategy and Engagement Division, Congressional Budget and Appropriations Office, Deputy Assistant Secretary of the Air Force (Budget), Headquarters U.S. Air Force, the Pentagon, Arlington, Va.
11. August 2008 – June 2009, Space and Nuclear Congressional Liaison, Congressional Budget and Appropriations Office, Deputy Assistant Secretary of the Air Force (Budget), Headquarters U.S. Air Force, the Pentagon, Arlington, Va.
12. June 2009 – May 2010, Space, Nuclear and Cyber Congressional Liaison, Congressional Budget and Appropriations Office, Deputy Assistant Secretary of the Air Force (Budget), Headquarters U.S. Air Force, the Pentagon, Arlington, Va.
13. June 2010 – June 2011, Senior Military Assistant/Executive Officer, Deputy Under Secretary of the Air Force (Space Programs), Headquarters U.S. Air Force, the Pentagon, Arlington, Va.
14. July 2011 – April 2012, Materiel Leader (Squadron Commander equivalent)/Chief, Evolved Expendable Launch Vehicle Strategic Planning Branch, Launch and Range Systems Directorate, Space and Missile Systems Center, Los Angeles AFB, Calif.
15. April 2012 – January 2013, Materiel Leader (Squadron Commander equivalent)/Chief, EELV Program Management Branch, Launch and Range Systems Directorate, Space and Missile Systems Center, Los Angeles AFB, Calif.
16. February 2013 – June 2013, Materiel Leader (Squadron Commander equivalent)/Chief, EELV Program Management Branch, and Acting Branch Chief, EELV New Entrant Acquisitions, Launch and Range Systems Directorate, Space and Missile Systems Center, Los Angeles AFB, Calif.
17. July 2013 – June 2014, Student, National War College, National Defense University, Fort Lesley J. McNair, Washington, D.C.
18. June 2014 – June 2017, Senior Materiel Leader (Group Commander equivalent) and Division Chief, Protected Satellite Communications (Advanced Extremely High Frequency (AEHF) Satellite Program), Military Satellite Communications Systems Directorate, Space and Missile Systems Center, Los Angeles AFB, Calif.
19. June 2017 – March 2020, Senior Materiel Leader (Wing Commander equivalent) and Director, Space Superiority Directorate, Space and Missile Systems Center, Los Angeles AFB, Calif.
20. March 2020 – June 2020, Acting Director, Plans, Programs, Financial Management, Headquarters United States Space Force, Peterson AFB, Colo.
21. June 2020–August 2020, Director, Plans, Programs, Financial Management, Headquarters United States Space Force, Peterson AFB, Colo.
22. August 2020–October 2020, Dual Hatted, Director, Strategic Requirements, Architectures and Analysis and Director, Plans, Programs and Financial Management, Headquarters United States Space Force, Peterson AFB, Colo.
23. October 2020–January 2021, Dual Hatted, Director, Strategic Requirements, Architectures and Analysis and Director, Plans, Programs and Financial Management, Headquarters Space Operations Command, Peterson AFB, Colo.
24. January 2021–May 2021, Commander, 45th Space Wing; and Director, Eastern Range, Patrick Space Force Base, Fla.
25. May 2021–August 2021, Commander, Space Launch Delta 45; and Director, Eastern Range, Patrick SFB, Fla.
26. Aug 2021–February 2022, Commander, Space Launch Delta 45; and Director, Eastern Range; and Director of Launch and Range Operations for Space Systems Command, Patrick SFB, Fla.
27. February 2022–June 2023, Commander, Space Launch Delta 45; and Program Executive Officer for Assured Access to Space; and Director, Eastern Range; and Director of Launch and Range Operations for Space Systems Command, Patrick SFB, Fla.
28. June 2023 – Present, Military Deputy, Office of the Assistant Secretary of the Air Force for Space Acquisition and Integration, HAF, the Pentagon, Arlington, Va.

== Personal life ==
Purdy is the son of Laura L. and Stephen G. Purdy Sr., a retired Air Force colonel. He is married to Wendy.

== Awards and decorations ==
Purdy is the recipient of the following awards:

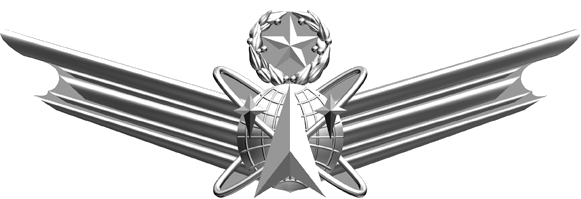
Command Space Operations Badge

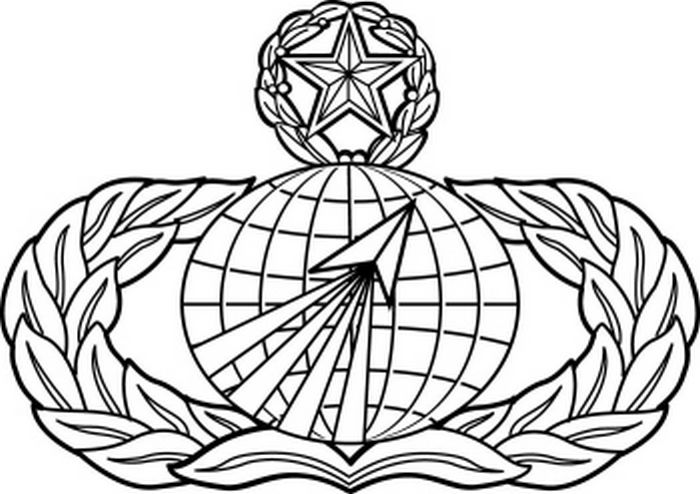

Air Force Master Acquisition and Financial Management Badge

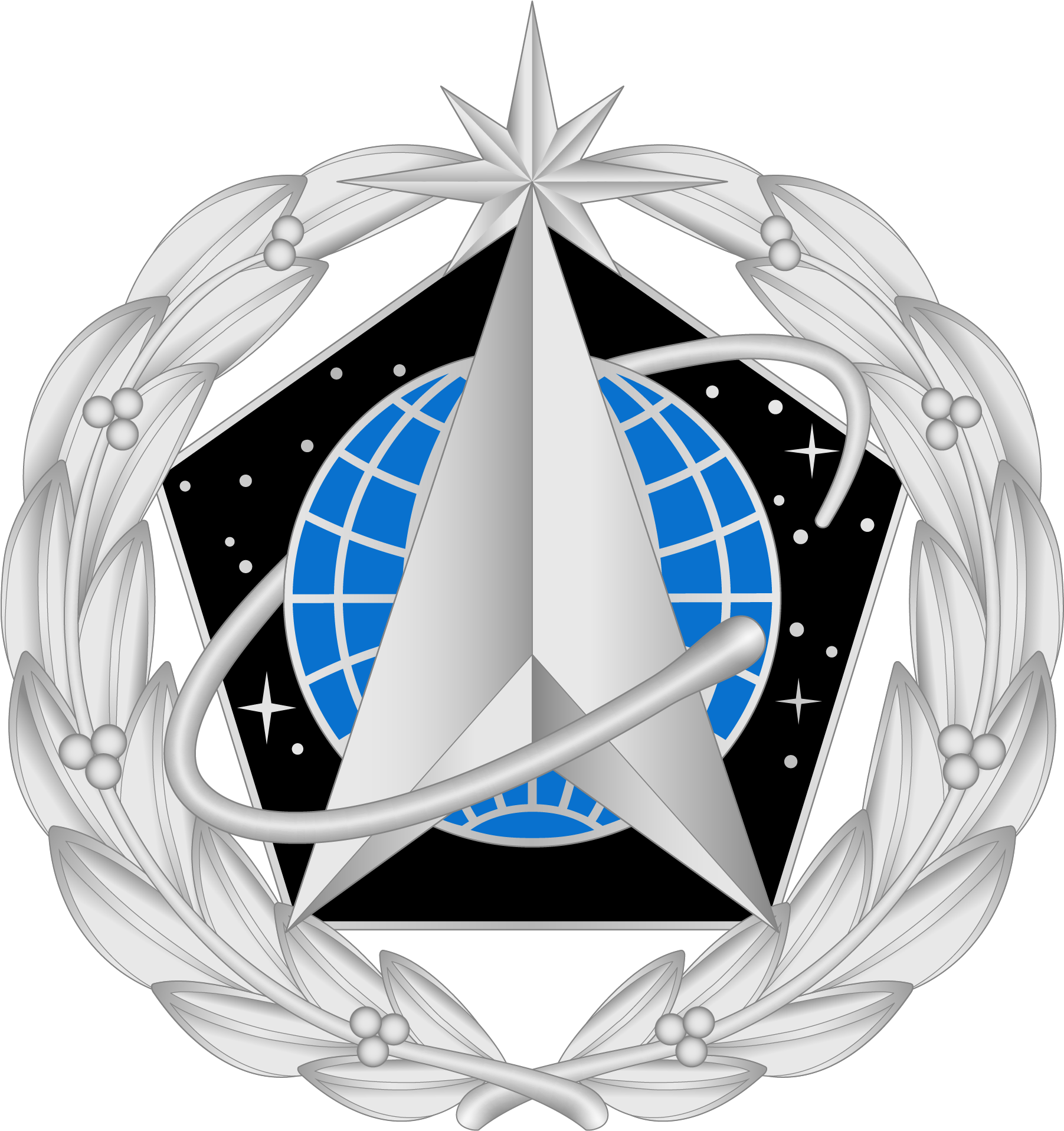

Space Staff Badge

Defense Superior Service Medal
Legion of Merit
Meritorious Service Medal with three bronze oak leaf clusters
Air Force Commendation Medal with one bronze oak leaf cluster
Air Force Achievement Medal with two bronze oak leaf clusters
Air Force Organizational Excellence Award with one silver and two bronze oak leaf clusters
National Defense Service Medal with one bronze service star
Global War on Terrorism Service Medal
Outstanding Volunteer Service Medal
Nuclear Deterrence Operations Service Medal
Air Force Longevity Service Award with one silver oak leaf cluster
Small Arms Expert Marksmanship Ribbon
Air Force Training Ribbon

== Dates of promotion ==
Rank	Branch	Date
Second Lieutenant	Air Force	18 December 1993
First Lieutenant	Air Force	2 November 1996
Captain	Air Force	1 November 1998
Major	Air Force	1 April 2005
Lieutenant Colonel	Air Force	1 March 2009
Colonel	Air Force	1 October 2014
Brigadier General	Air Force	6 August 2020
Brigadier General	Space Force	~29 April 2021
Major General	Space Force	1 December 2022

Military offices
Preceded by Philip Garrant	Director of the Space Superiority Systems Directorate; 2017–2019	Directorate inactivated
New title	Director of Special Programs of the Space and Missile Systems Center; 2019–2020	Succeeded by Dennis Bythewood
Preceded by David N. Miller	Director of Plans, Programs, and Financial Management of the Space Operations Command; 2020 (acting); 2020–2021	Succeeded by Brian T. Kehl
Preceded by William Liquori	Director of Requirements, Architectures, and Analysis of the Space Operations Command; 2020	Succeeded by Jack D. Fulmer II
Preceded by Douglas Schiess	Commander of Space Launch Delta 45 and Director of the Eastern Range; 2021–2023	Succeeded by Kristin Panzenhagen
New office	Director of Launch and Range Operations of the Space Systems Command; 2021–2023	Succeeded by Kristin Panzenhagen
Preceded by D. Jason Cothern	Program Executive Officer for Assured Access to Space of the United States Space Force; 2022–2023	Succeeded by Kristin Panzenhagen
Preceded by Steven P. Whitney	Military Deputy to the Assistant Secretary of the Air Force for Space Acquisition and Integration; 2023–present	Incumbent
