= Space Superiority Systems Directorate =

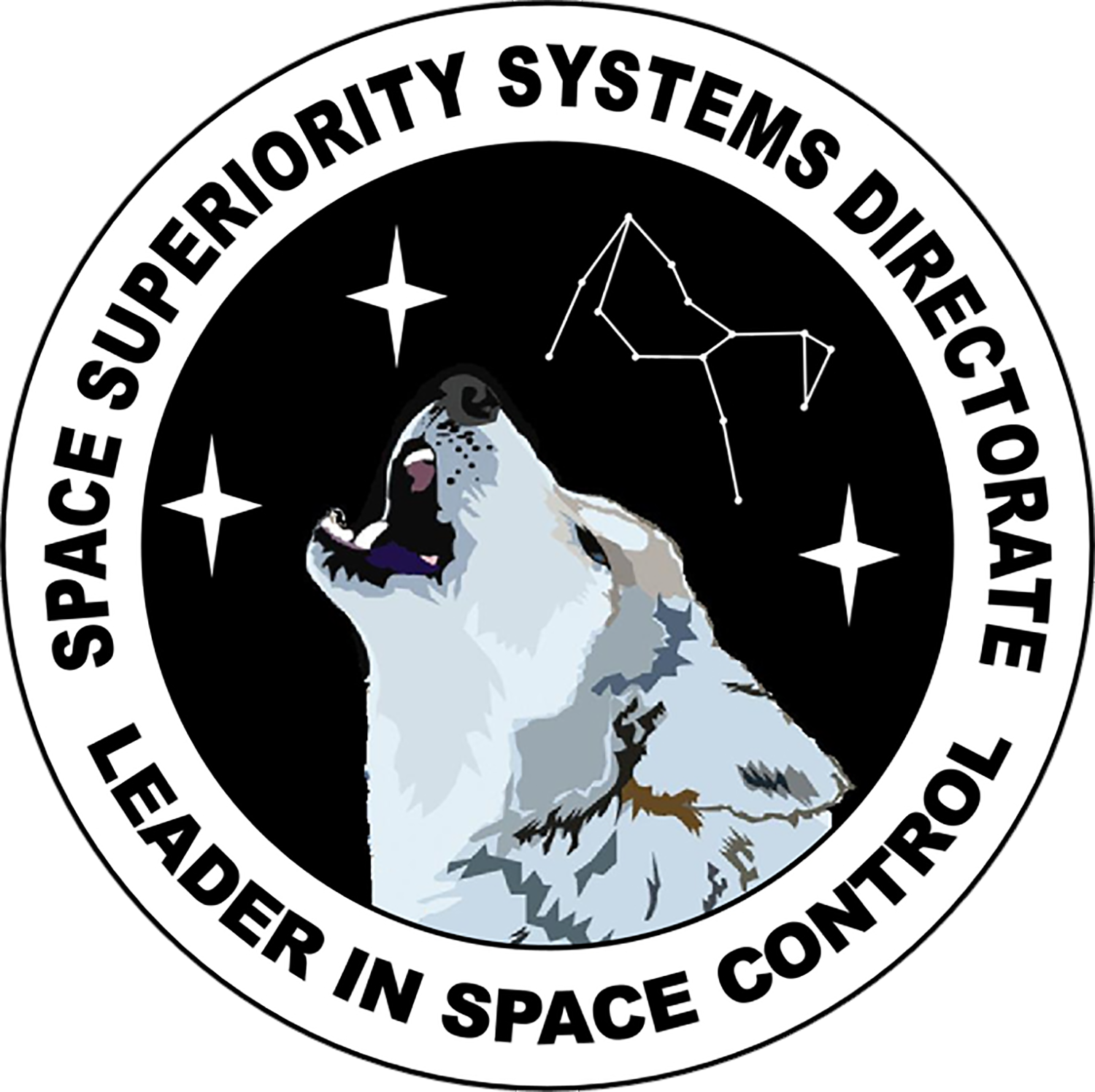
- Seal of the Space Superiority Systems Directorate
- Active: 19??-Present
- Country: United States
- Branch: United States Space Force
- Part of: Space and Missile Systems Center
- Garrison/HQ: Los Angeles AFB, California

The Space Superiority Systems Directorate at Los Angeles Air Force Base includes the "Space Situational Awareness Group" and the "Counterspace Group".

== Mission ==
Their mission is to "develop, deliver, and sustain" capabilities that "ensure space superiority" for the United States. "The visible sensor on the SBSS satellite will be used to provide critical information vital to the protection of US military and civilian satellites," said Lt Col Robert Erickson, squadron commander for Space Based Space Surveillance within the Space Superiority Systems Wing.

== History ==
The Air Force has proposed to cut in half funding for Counterspace and Space Control programs in its 2011 budget request, while increasing the budget for space tracking.

== Bases stationed ==
- Los Angeles AFB, California

== List of directors ==
- Col Arnold H. Streland
- Col Mark Baird, July 2012 – September 2014
- Col Philip A. Garrant, May 2014 – June 2017
- Col Stephen G. Purdy Jr., 2 August 2017 – March 2020
