= William Liquori =

U.S. Space Force general

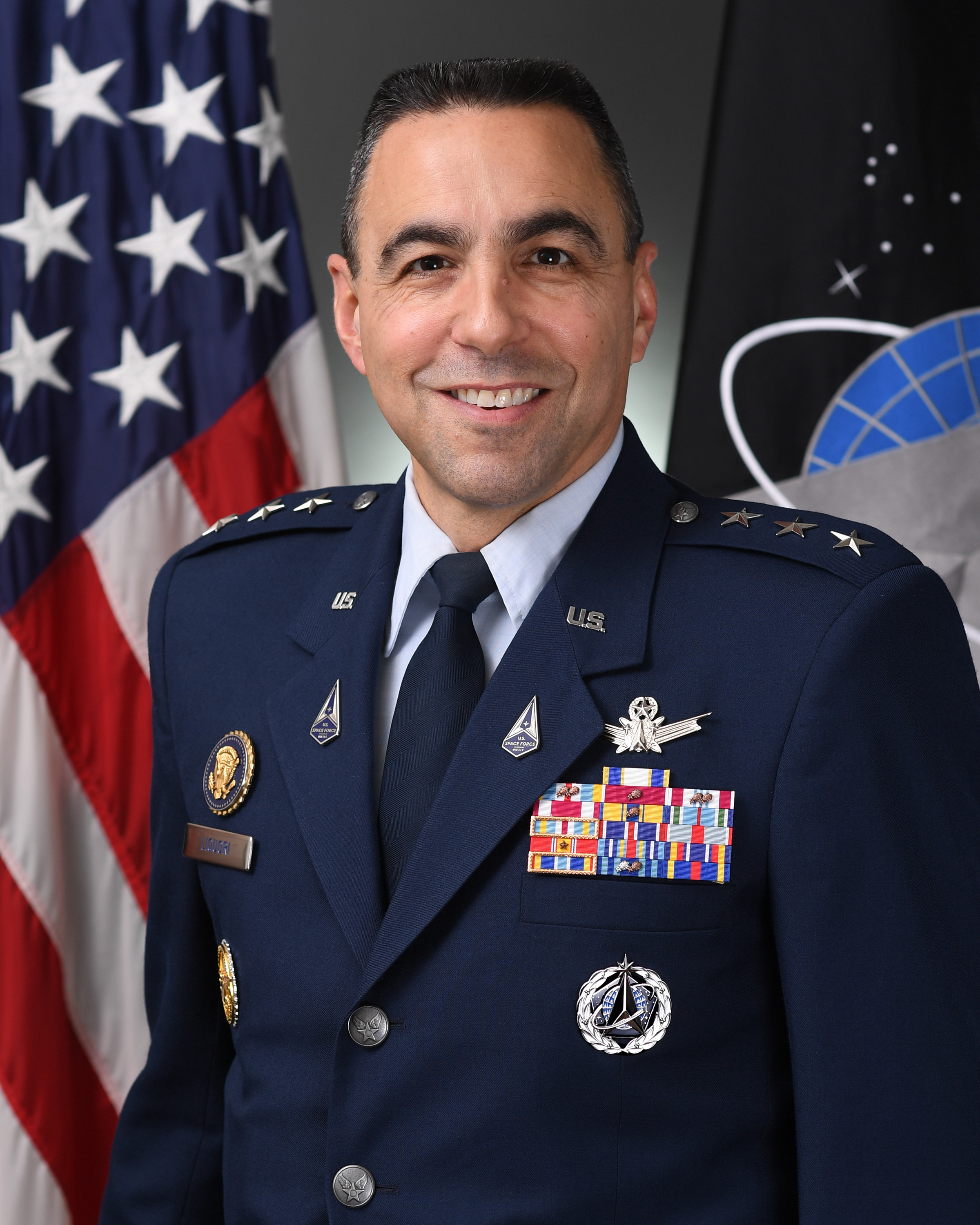
- Official portrait, 2022
- Born: c. 1969 (age 56–57); Massachusetts, U.S.
- Alma mater: Boston University (BA); Webster University (MA)
- Spouse: Amy Liquori
- Military career
- Allegiance: United States
- Branch: United States Air Force (1991–2020); United States Space Force (2020–2022)
- Service years: 1991–2022
- Rank: Lieutenant General
- Commands: 50th Space Wing; Space Operations Squadron
- Conflicts: War in Afghanistan; Iraq War
- Awards: Air Force Distinguished Service Medal; Defense Superior Service Medal (3); Legion of Merit (2)

William J. Liquori Jr. (born c. 1969) is a retired United States Space Force lieutenant general who has served as the deputy chief of space operations for strategy, plans, programs, requirements, and analysis from 2020 to 2022. A career space operator, he has operational experiences in support of Operation Southern Watch and Operation Enduring Freedom.

== Early life and education ==
Liquori was born in Massachusetts. He graduated from Boston University in 1991 with a B.A. degree in computer science. He later received an M.A. degree in computer resources and information management in 1996 from Webster University. He also attended seminars from the Massachusetts Institute of Technology and University of North Carolina at Chapel Hill.

== Military career ==
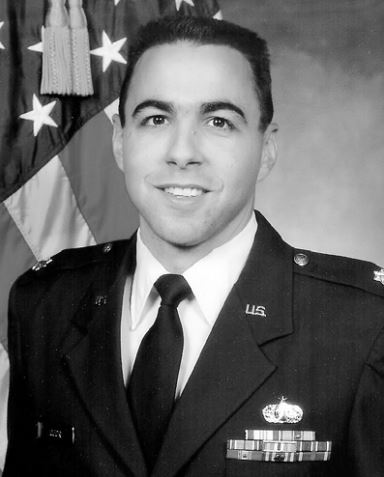
Liquori, c. 2006.

Liquori entered the Air Force on May 11, 1991, as a distinguished graduate of the Air Force Reserve Officer Training Corps program at Boston University. His career has included numerous operations and staff positions in Air Force Space Command, the National Reconnaissance Office, the Air Force Secretariat, United States European Command and the Office of the Secretary of Defense. Liquori has commanded a space operations squadron and the 50th Space Wing. He is a graduate and former instructor of the USAF Weapons School. His operational experiences include operations Southern Watch and Enduring Freedom.

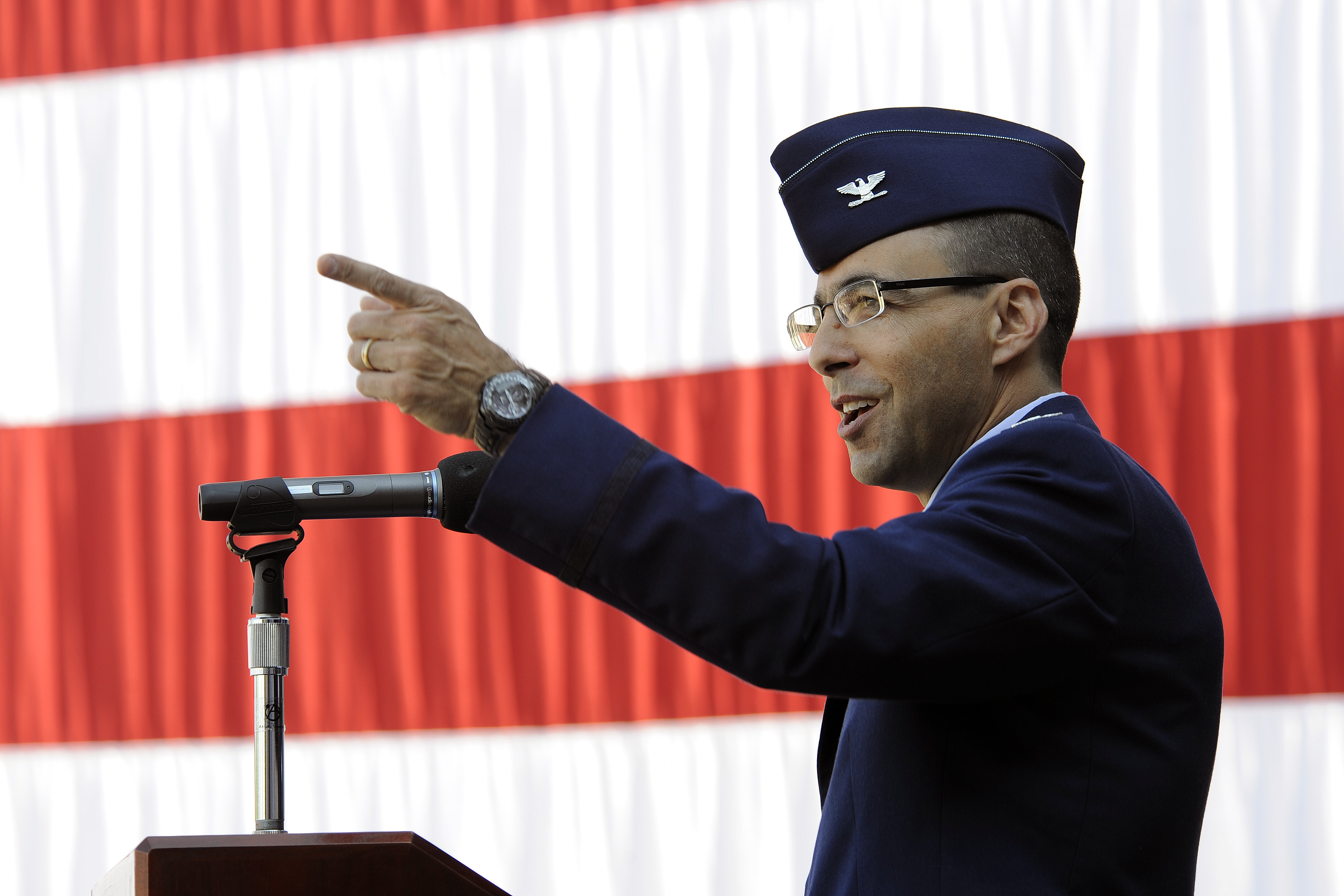
Liquori speaks after taking command of the 50th Space Wing, July 10, 2013.

In July 2020, Liquori was nominated for transfer to the United States Space Force, promotion to lieutenant general, and assignment as deputy chief of space operations for strategy, plans, programs, requirements, and analysis.

Liquori retired from active duty on August 1, 2022.

=== Assignments ===
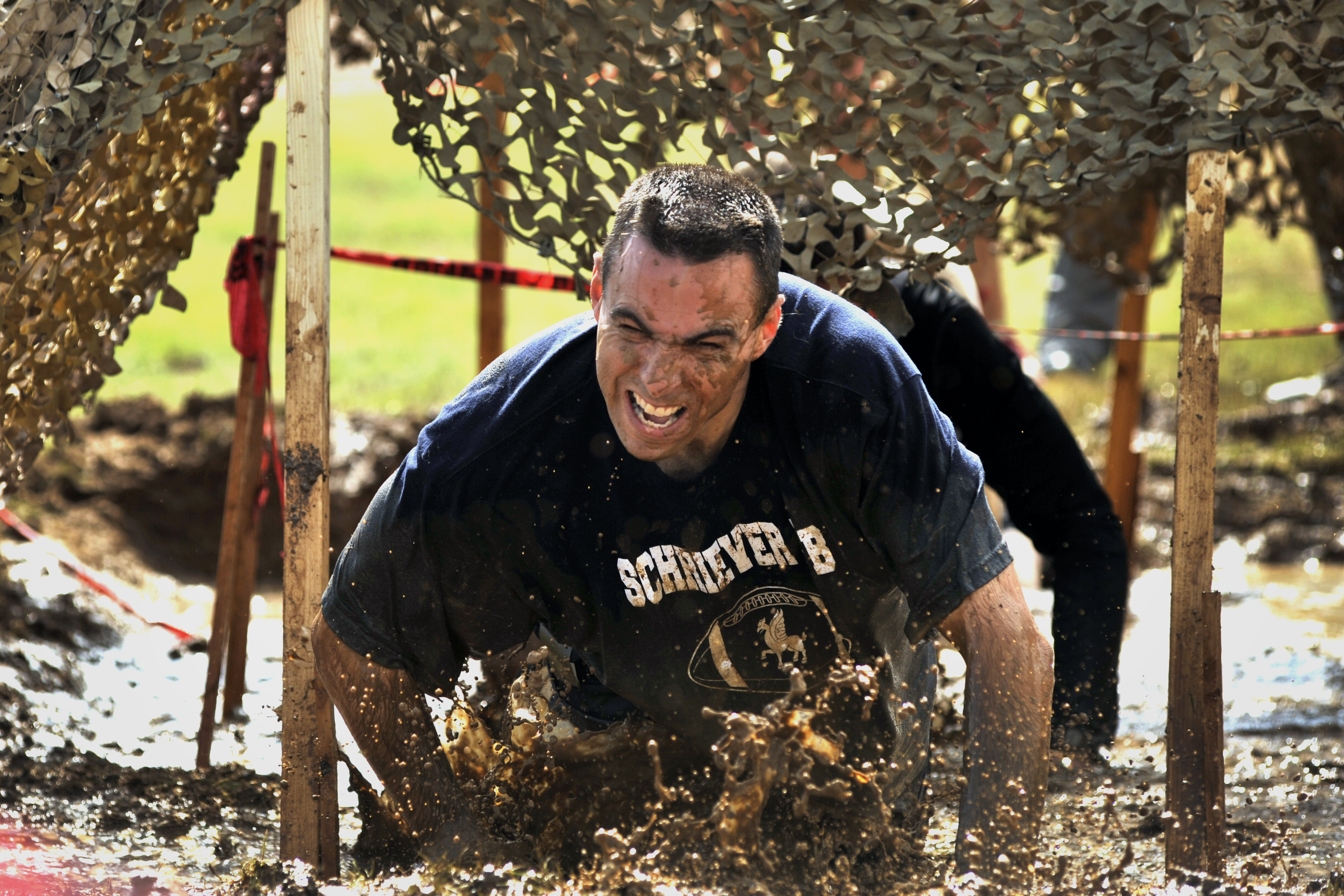
Liquori, 50th Space Wing commander, navigates an obstacle course during Schriever Week in 2014.

1. May 1992 – July 1992, Student, Undergraduate Space Training, Lowry Air Force Base, Colorado
2. August 1992 – March 1996, Chief, UHF F/O Procedures Section, Senior Satellite Operations Crew Commander, Satellite Engineering Officer, Satellite Operations Crew Commander, Student, 3rd Space Operations Squadron, Falcon Air Force Base, Colorado
3. March 1996 – June 2000, Executive Officer, Chief, Launch Readiness Division, Operations Support Flight Commander, Senior Flight Commander, Flight Commander, Office of Space Operations, Assistant Secretary of the Air Force (Space) with duty at the National Reconnaissance Office, Onizuka Air Station, California
4. June 2000 – December 2000, Student, U.S. Air Force Weapons School, Nellis Air Force Base
5. January 2001 – June 2003, Assistant Operations Officer, Missions Flight Commander, Instructor, 328th Weapons Squadron, U.S. Air Force Weapons School, Nellis Air Force Base
6. July 2003 – June 2004, Student, Air Command and Staff College, Maxwell Air Force Base.
7. July 2004 – June 2005, Student, School of Advanced Air and Space Studies, Maxwell Air Force Base
8. July 2005 – June 2006, Chief, Space Control and Force Application Branch, National Security Space Office, Office of the Under Secretary of the Air Force, the Pentagon, Arlington, Virginia
9. June 2006 – June 2008, Commander, Space Operations Squadron, Buckley Air Force Base, Colorado.
10. July 2008 – June 2009, Student, U.S. Marine Corps War College
11. July 2009 – June 2011, Chief, Missile Defense Division, Strategy, Policy, Partnering, and Capabilities Directorate, U.S. European Command, Stuttgart-Vaihingen, Germany
12. June 2011 – July 2013, Chief of Staff of the Air Force Fellow, with duty as Director, Space Policy Implementation, Office of the Deputy Assistant Secretary of Defense (Space), Office of the Under Secretary of Defense for Policy, the Pentagon
13. July 2013 – May 2015, Commander, 50th Space Wing, Schriever Air Force Base, Colorado
14. June 2015 – February 2016, Senior Military Assistant to the Under Secretary of the Air Force, the Pentagon
15. February 2016 – August 2018, Director, Space Policy, National Security Council, Executive Office of the President, Washington, D.C.
16. August 2018 – December 2019, Director of Strategic Requirements, Architectures and Analysis, Headquarters Air Force Space Command, Peterson Air Force Base, Colorado
17. December 2019–August 2020, Director of Strategic Requirements, Architectures and Analysis, Headquarters U.S. Space Force, Peterson AFB, Colo. 18. August 2020–August 2022, Deputy Chief of Space Operations for Strategy, Plans, Programs, Requirements, and Analysis, United States Space Force, the Pentagon, Arlington, VA.

== Civilian career ==
After retiring, Liquori founded Polaris Strategic Insight, LLC, a consulting and mentoring firm for aerospace organizations and individuals. In February 2023, he was hired by Intuitive Machines as the director of the board of directors. In March 2023, First Command Financial Services tapped him to serve as a member of the First Command Military Advisory Board, a group of retired senior flag officers and senior enlisted leaders from each branch of the nation's military services that advise the company on how to best serve the interests of career military families.

== Personal life ==
Liquori is married to Amy Liquori with whom he has three children.

== Awards and decorations ==
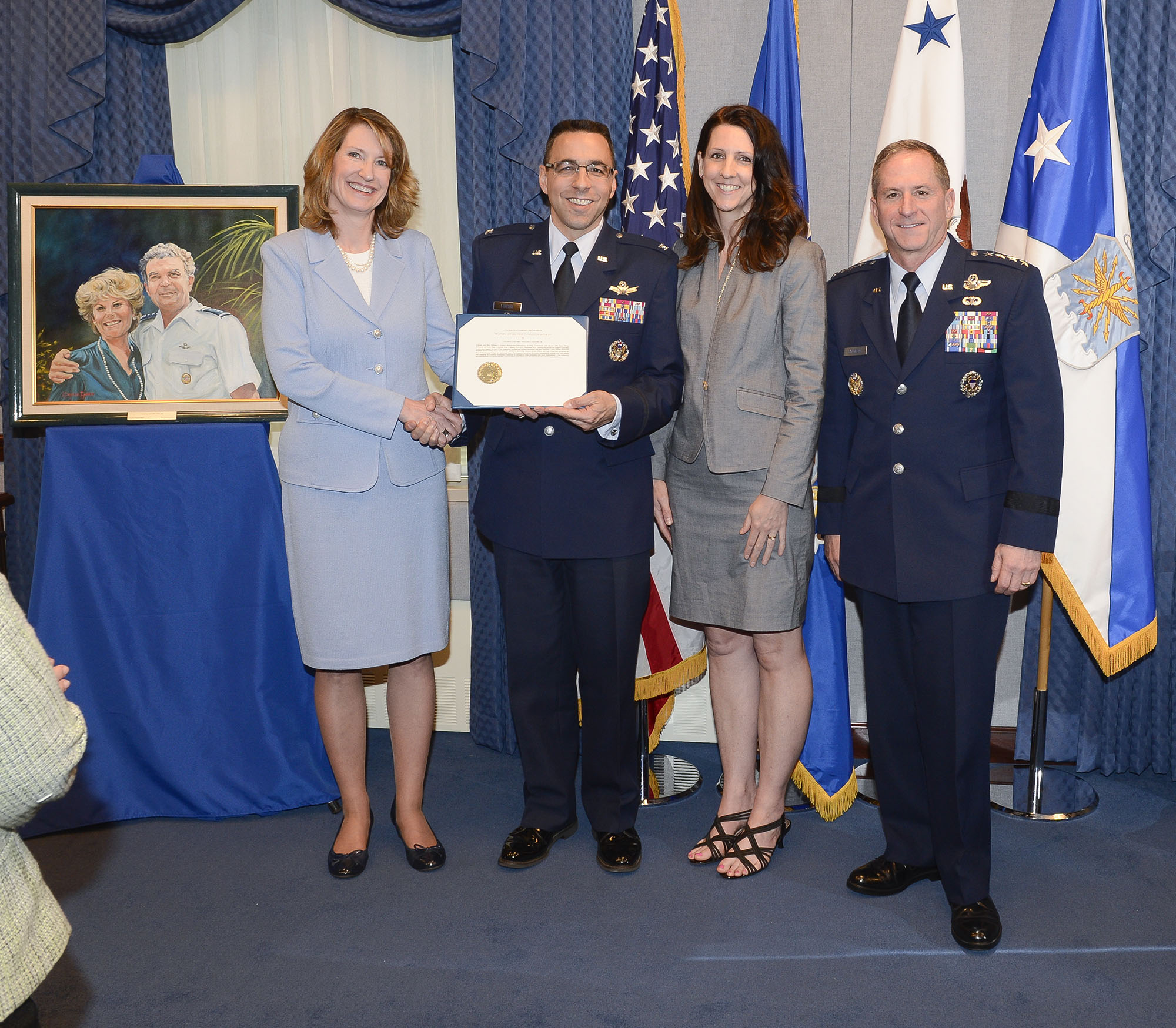
Under Secretary Lisa Disbrow and Vice Chief of Staff Gen David L. Goldfein present the 2015 General and Mrs. Jerome F. O'Malley Award to Col. William Liquori Jr. and his wife Amy during a ceremony in the Pentagon, May 3, 2016.

Liquori is the recipient of the following awards:

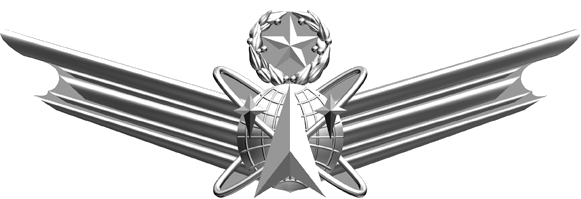
Command Space Operations Badge

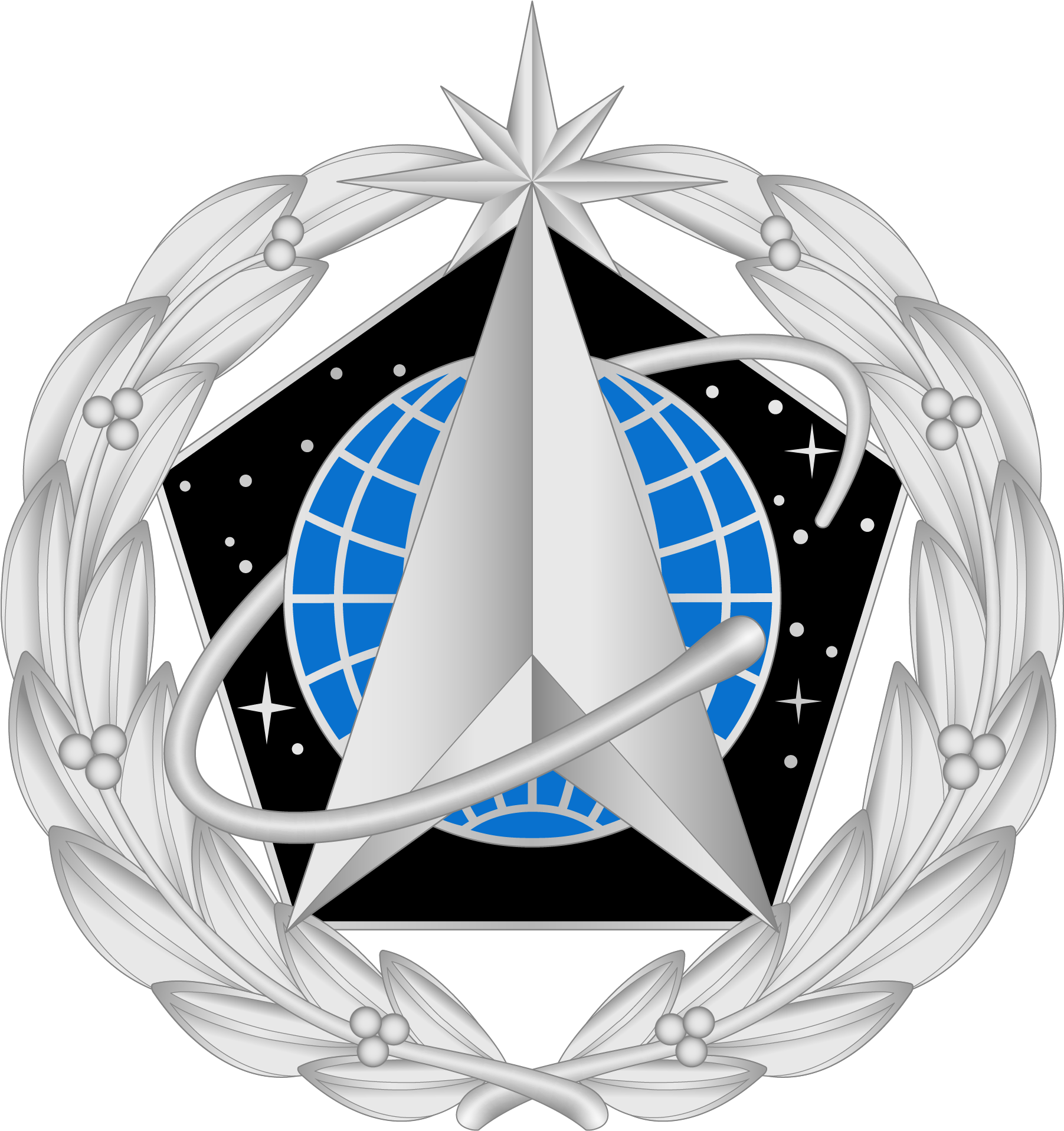

Space Staff Badge

Office of the Secretary of Defense Identification Badge

Presidential Service Badge

Air Force Distinguished Service Medal
Defense Superior Service Medal with two bronze oak leaf clusters
Legion of Merit with one bronze oak leaf cluster
Defense Meritorious Service Medal with two bronze oak leaf clusters
Meritorious Service Medal
Air Force Commendation Medal with one bronze oak leaf cluster
Joint Service Achievement Medal
Joint Meritorious Unit Award
Air Force Outstanding Unit Award
Air Force Recognition Ribbon
National Defense Service Medal with one bronze service star
Global War on Terrorism Expeditionary Medal
Global War on Terrorism Service Medal
Air Force Expeditionary Service Ribbon with Gold Border
Air Force Longevity Service Award with one silver and one bronze oak leaf clusters
Air Force Training Ribbon

- 2015 U.S. Air Force General and Mrs. Jerome F. O'Malley Award

== Dates of promotion ==
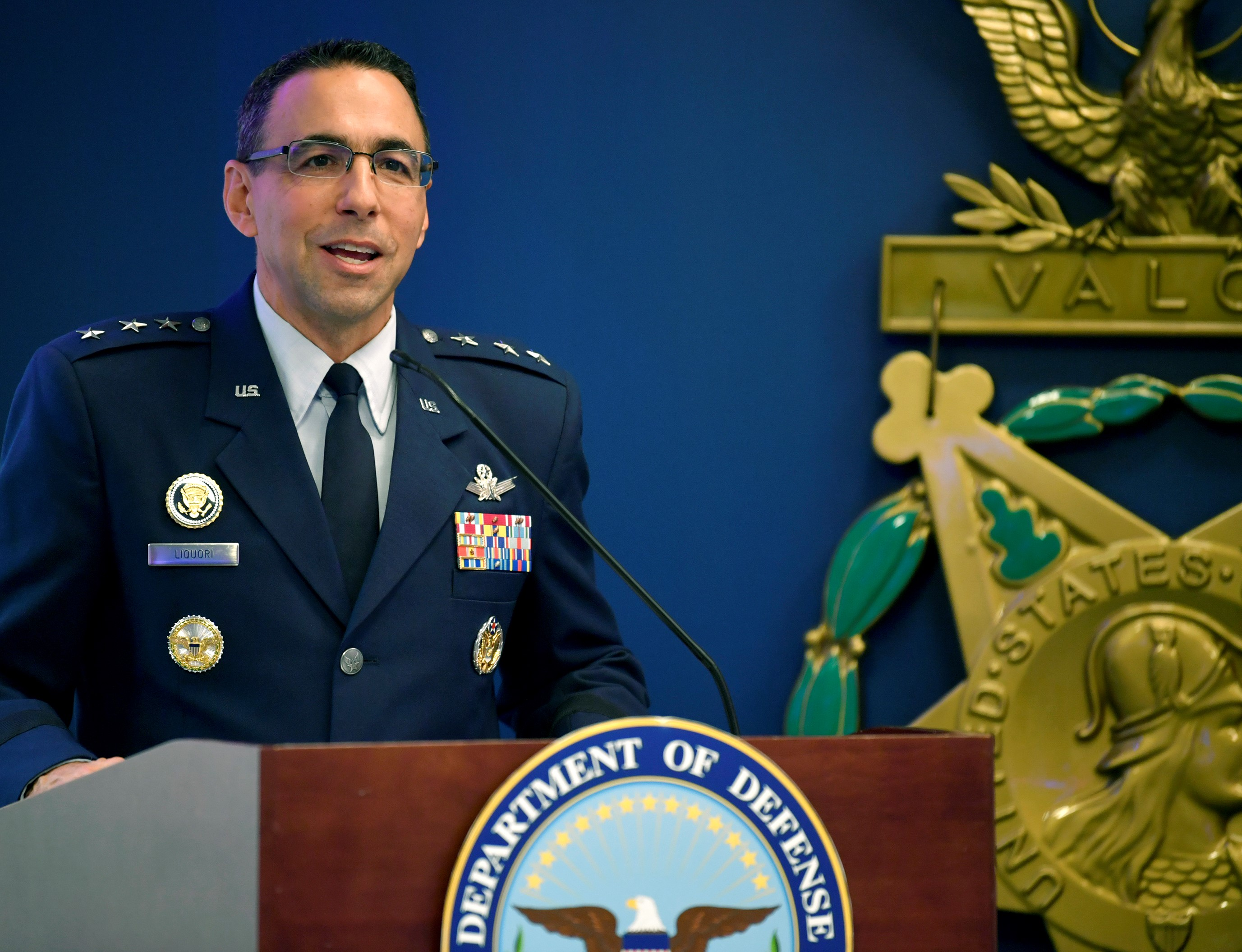
Liquori speaks during his promotion ceremony to lieutenant general, September 8, 2020.

Rank	Branch	Date
Second Lieutenant	Air Force	May 11, 1991
First Lieutenant	Air Force	November 3, 1993
Captain	Air Force	November 3, 1995
Major	Air Force	August 1, 2002
Lieutenant Colonel	Air Force	March 1, 2006
Colonel	Air Force	October 1, 2009
Brigadier General	Air Force	July 3, 2016
Major General	Air Force	May 2, 2019
Lieutenant General	Space Force	August 7, 2020

== Writings ==
- With Iris Ferguson (July 14, 2021). "How the US Space Force plans to improve Arctic communication". C4ISRNET.
- With B. Chance Saltzman (December 2006). "Counterspace Command and Control: Looking to History for Advice" (PDF). In Brown, Kendall K. (ed.). Space Power Integration: Perspective from Space Weapons Officer. Maxwell Air Force Base, Alabama: Air University Press. pp. 159–168. ISBN 1-58566-158-9.

Military offices
Preceded by James P. Ross	Commander of the 50th Space Wing; 2013–2015	Succeeded by DeAnna Burt
Preceded by Brian T. Kehl	Senior Military Assistant to the Under Secretary of the Air Force; 2015–2016	Succeeded by David R. Iverson
Preceded by Chirag Parikh	Director for Space Policy of the United States National Security Council; 2016–2018	Succeeded by Michele C. Edmondson
Preceded by John E. Shaw	Director of Strategic Requirements, Architectures and Analysis of the Air Force Space Command, later United States Space Force; 2018–2020	Succeeded by Stephen G. Purdy
New title	Deputy Chief of Space Operations for Strategy, Plans, Programs, Requirements, and Analysis; 2020–2022	Succeeded by Philip Garrant
