= Mark Baird =

U.S. Air Force general

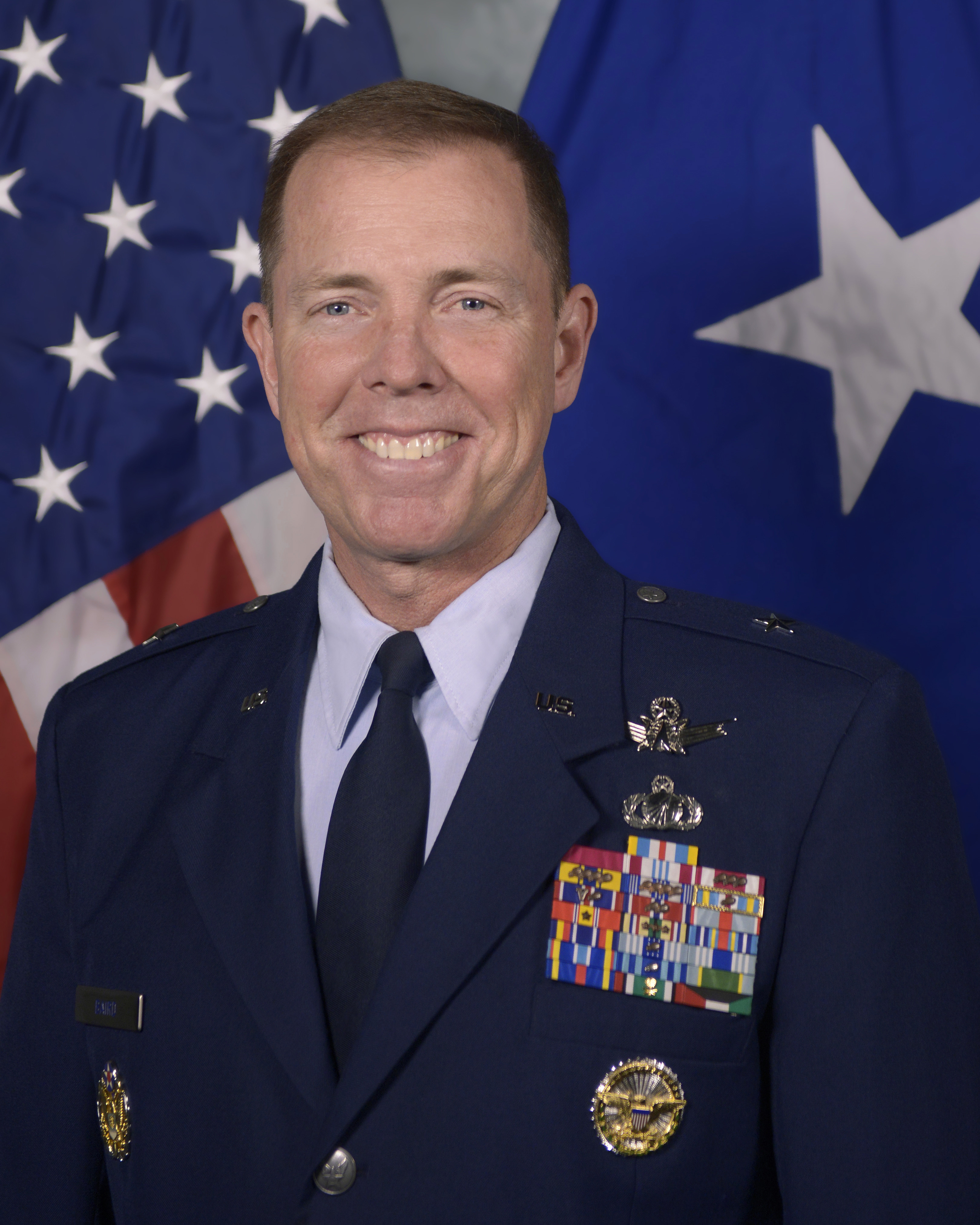
- Official portrait, 2018
- Born: December 14, 1965; Miami, Florida, U.S.
- Died: November 30, 2023 (aged 57); Denver, Colorado, U.S.
- Burial place: Arlington National Cemetery
- Military career
- Allegiance: United States
- Branch: United States Air Force
- Service years: 1989–2019
- Rank: Brigadier general
- Commands: Air Force Installation Contracting Agency; Space Superiority Systems Directorate; 16th Contracting Squadron
- Awards: Air Force Distinguished Service Medal; Defense Superior Service Medal; Legion of Merit (3)

Mark A. Baird (December 14, 1965 – November 30, 2023) was a retired United States Air Force brigadier general who last served as the deputy director of the Space Force Planning Task Force. He previously was the Deputy Director of the National Reconnaissance Office.

After working briefly at Lockheed Martin as a "Principal Director of Strategy for Space and Special Programs," Baird went on to be the president of VOX Space, a subsidiary of Virgin Orbit, on 17 August 2021.

Baird died on November 30, 2023, and he was buried at the Arlington National Cemetery.

Military offices
Preceded by Arnold H. Streland	Director of the Space Superiority Systems Directorate; 2012–2014	Succeeded by Philip Garrant
Preceded by Casey D. Blake	Commander of the Air Force Installation Contracting Agency; 2014–2015	Succeeded by Cameron Holt
Preceded by Robert McMurry	Vice Commander of the Space and Missile Systems Center; 2016–2017	Succeeded by Philip Garrant
Preceded by Roger Teague	Director for Space Programs of the Office of the Assistant Secretary for Acquisition; 2017–2018	Succeeded by Nina Armagno
Preceded by Stephen Denker	Deputy Director of the National Reconnaissance Office; 2018	Succeeded by Michael Guetlein
New office	Deputy Director of the Space Force Planning Task Force; 2018–2019	Position disestablished
