= Los Angeles Air Force Base =

US Air Force base in El Segundo, California, United States

- El Segundo, California in the United States
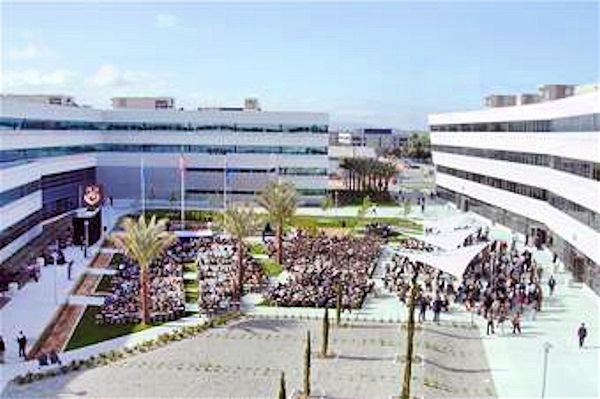
- The dedication ceremony of the Schriever Space Complex at Los Angeles AFB on 24 April 2006

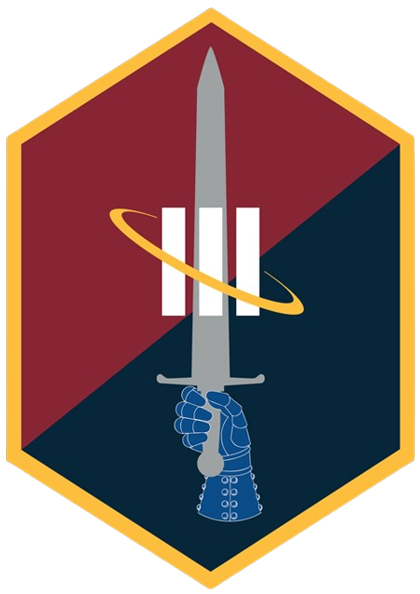
- Shield of Space Base Delta 3

Site information
- Type: U.S. Space Force base
- Owner: Department of Defense
- Operator: United States Space Force
- Controlled by: Space Base Delta 3
- Condition: Operational
- Website: www.losangeles.spaceforce.mil

Location
- Shown within the United States.
- Coordinates: 33°55′09″N 118°22′50″W

Site history
- Built: 1962–1964 (as Los Angeles Air Force Station)
- In use: 1964–present

Garrison information
- Current commander: Col Andrew C. Dermanoski
- Garrison: Space Base Delta 3
- Occupants: Space Systems Command

Los Angeles Air Force Base (LAAFB) is a United States Space Force base located in El Segundo, California. Los Angeles Air Force Base is managed by Space Base Delta 3 and houses and supports the headquarters of the Space Systems Command field command of the United States Space Force, which was established on August 13, 2021. The center manages research, development and acquisition of military space systems.

== History ==
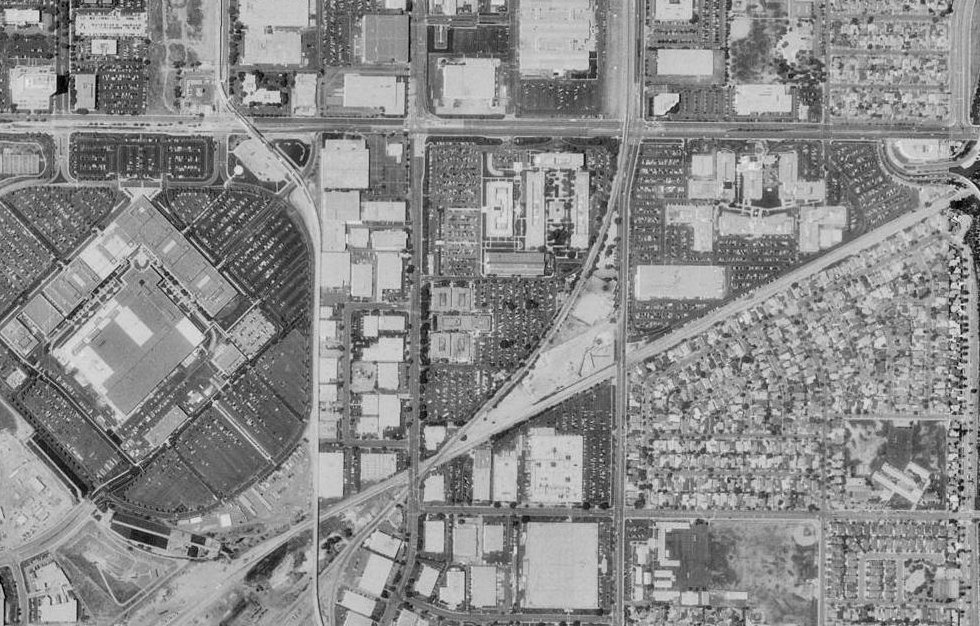
Aerial photograph of Los Angeles AFB in 1994

Los Angeles Air Force Base traces its history back to the Air Research and Development Command's Western Development Division, which was activated on 1 July 1954 in Inglewood, not far from the current base.

In 1961 the Air Force developed a plan to consolidate its Space Systems Division and the Research and Development (R&D) Center of The Aerospace Corporation, which was created in 1960 to support Air Force space programs. The plan involved the acquisition of two pieces of real estate adjoining the R&D Center. An aircraft plant owned by the Navy, at the northwest corner of Aviation and El Segundo Boulevards, was transferred to the Air Force in October 1962. Another site, at the southwest corner of the same intersection, was owned by a mining company. The Aerospace Corporation purchased that property in November 1962, and between February 1963 and April 1964, it constructed its new headquarters there. By April 10, 1964, the Air Force property at the intersection of Aviation and El Segundo Boulevards was designated as the Los Angeles Air Force Station, which was re-designated as the Los Angeles Air Force Base in September 1987.

In 2006 Area A of LAAFB was permanently closed after a deal with a local builder to exchange the land in Area A for the creation of the General Bernard Schriever Space Complex in Area B and other new facilities. In February 2007, a new base exchange opened up in Area B.

The portion of Fort MacArthur remaining in military use is a sub-base of Los Angeles Air Force Base serving as a housing and administrative annex. Fort MacArthur is in the San Pedro district of Los Angeles, approximately twenty miles southeast of Los Angeles Air Force Base.

== Role and operations ==
Los Angeles Air Force Base is headquarters to the Space Systems Command (SSC), a field command of the United States Space Force (USSF). SSC is responsible for research, development, acquisition, on-orbit testing, reliability, maintenance, sustainment and operations of specific military space systems. In addition to managing Space Force space systems development, SSC participated in space programs conducted by other U.S. military services, government agencies and North Atlantic Treaty Organization (NATO) allies. SSC turns some of these acquired systems over to the different operations commands including: the United States Space Command (USSPACECOM) and Space Operations Command (SpOC) after going through the Space Training and Readiness Command (STARCOM) where Office of the Director of Operational Test and Evaluation (DOT&E) conducts independent operational test and evaluation.

=== Space Base Delta 3 ===
The Space Base Delta 3 provides medical, civil engineering, communications, chaplain, security, logistics, personnel, readiness, and quality-of-life services to the Space and Missile Systems Center and other Department of Defense units in the Los Angeles basin. It consists of five squadrons and six staff agencies, totaling more than 790 personnel with $608 million in plant assets and an annual budget of $60 million.

=== Space Systems Command (SSC) ===
The Space Systems Command (SSC) is a USSF field command that works in the areas involving military space acquisition and specific space-based operations by the Department of Defense. In summer 2021, the center was re-designated as Space Systems Command, one of the three major commands under the United States Space Force. It oversees the development, acquisition, launching, and sustaining of military space systems.

==== Global Positioning Systems Directorate ====
The Global Positioning Systems Directorate, formerly the Global Positioning Systems Wing, is a joint-service, multinational, civil/military systems directorate with more than 700 DoD/contractor personnel responsible for the development, launch and sustainment of the Global Positioning System. The directorate is responsible for the development and procurement of over 250,000 receiver systems and the United States' nuclear detonation detection system. Annual funding is $1 billion and the total program value is $32 billion.

==== Space Superiority Systems Directorate ====
Formerly the Space Superiority Systems Wing, the Space Superiority Systems Directorate is responsible for weapon systems development, fielding, and sustainment.

==== Launch Enterprise Directorate ====
The Launch Enterprise Directorate provides DoD and the National Reconnaissance Office with access to space through launch systems modernization, sustainment, and development of worldwide ranges for national security. The directorate conducts satellite mission integration and provides tools to test and support the nation's space launch, ballistic missile, and aeronautical testing.

==== MILSATCOM Systems Directorate ====
The Military Satellite Communications Directorate (MILSATCOM), formerly the Military Satellite Communications Systems Wing, plans for, acquires, and sustains space-enabled global communications in support of the president, secretary of Defense and combat forces. MILSATCOM systems consists of satellites, terminals, and control stations, worth more than $42 billion providing communication for approximately 16,000 aircraft, ships, mobile, and fixed sites. As a jointly-staffed directorate, it interfaces with major commands from each of the Armed Services, HQ Air Force and various DoD agencies.

==== Advanced Systems and Development Directorate ====
The Advanced Systems and Development Directorate is an organization for systems and development planning for future Space capabilities. Serves as primary provider of launch, spaceflight, hosted payloads and on-orbit operations for the entire DoD space research and development community. Responsible for acquiring, integrating, launching, and operating R&D spacecraft, prototype operational systems, boosters, and ballistic missiles supporting national security objectives/missile defense programs. Co-located at LAAFB and Kirtland AFB, New Mexico.

==== Space Logistics Directorate ====
Located at Peterson Space Force Base in Colorado, the Space Logistics Directorate has 550 people and a $500 million annual budget. It sustains and modifies worldwide USAF/DoD space weapon systems to include terrestrial and space weather, global positioning systems, launch range control, satellite command and control, secure communications, and missiles early warning. The directorate is the focal point for logistics, maintenance, supply, sustaining engineering and the Space Logistics Readiness Center.

==== Operationally Responsive Space Office ====
The mission of the Operationally Responsive Space Office (ORS) is to plan and prepare for the rapid development of space capabilities.

==== Range and Network Division ====
The Range and Network Division is responsible for modernizing and sustaining the world-wide Space Force Satellite Control Network as well as the nation's Launch and Test Range Systems located at Vandenberg SFB, California, and Cape Canaveral SFS, Florida.

== Based units ==
Notable units based at Los Angeles Air Force Base:

=== United States Space Force ===
- Space Base Delta 3 (SBD)
  - 61st Civil Engineering and Logistics Squadron
  - 61st Space Communications Squadron
  - 61st Force Support Squadron
  - 61st Medical Squadron
  - 61st Security Forces Squadron
- Space Systems Command
  - Advanced Systems and Development Directorate
  - Global Positioning Systems Directorate
  - Launch Enterprise Directorate
  - MILSATCOM Systems Directorate
  - Range and Network Division
  - Remote Sensing Systems Directorate
  - Space Superiority Systems Directorate

== Education ==
The base housing is assigned to schools in the Los Angeles Unified School District; the district does not operate any schools on-post. Fort MacArthur residents are zoned to Leland Street Elementary School, while Crest and Heights residents are zoned to White Point Elementary School. All base housing is zoned to Dana Middle School and San Pedro High School.
