= Leadership of Space Systems Command =

U.S. Space Force senior officer

This is a list of all commanders of Space Systems Command and all its historical antecedents, organizations that took its lineage.

== List of commanders ==
Commander of Space Systems Command
- Space Systems Command emblem

- Flag of a Space Force lieutenant general

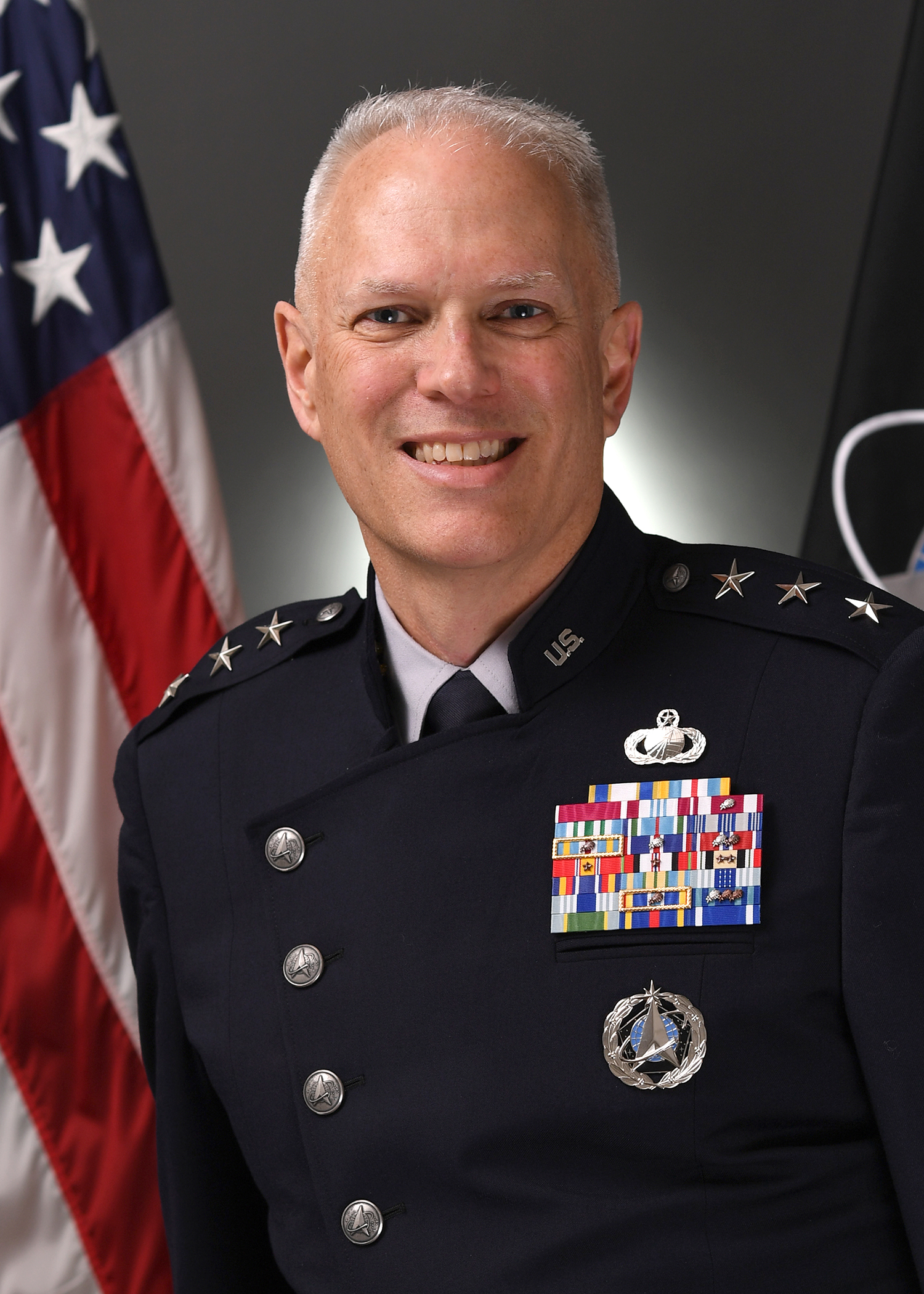
- Incumbent; Lieutenant General Philip Garrant since 1 February 2024
- United States Space Force
- Reports to: Chief of Space Operations
- Seat: Los Angeles Air Force Base, California, U.S.
- Precursor: Commander, Space and Missile Systems Center
- Formation: 2 August 1954
- First holder: Bernard A. Schriever
- Deputy: Deputy Commander, Space Systems Command

No.	Commander		Term		
No.	Portrait	Name	Took office	Left office	Duration
Western Development Division
1	Bernard A. Schriever	Major General; Bernard A. Schriever (1910–2005)	2 August 1954	31 May 1957	2 years, 302 days
Air Force Ballistic Missile Division
1	Bernard A. Schriever	Major General; Bernard A. Schriever (1910–2005)	1 June 1957	24 April 1959	1 year, 327 days
2	Osmond J. Ritland	Major General; Osmond J. Ritland (1909–1991)	25 April 1959	31 March 1961	1 year, 340 days
Space Systems Division
1	Osmond J. Ritland	Major General; Osmond J. Ritland (1909–1991)	1 April 1961	13 May 1962	1 year, 42 days
2	Howell M. Estes Jr.	Lieutenant General; Howell M. Estes Jr. (1914–2007)	14 May 1962	2 October 1962	141 days
3	Ben I. Funk	Major General; Ben I. Funk (1913–2012)	3 October 1962	31 August 1966	3 years, 332 days
4	Paul T. Cooper	Major General; Paul T. Cooper (born 1919)	1 September 1966	30 June 1967	302 days
Space and Missile Systems Organization
1	John W. O'Neill	Lieutenant General; John W. O'Neill (1919–1977)	1 July 1967	31 August 1969	2 years, 61 days
2	Samuel C. Phillips	Lieutenant General; Samuel C. Phillips (1921–1990)	1 September 1969	24 August 1972	2 years, 358 days
3	Kenneth W. Schultz	Lieutenant General; Kenneth W. Schultz (1920–2005)	25 August 1972	28 August 1975	3 years, 3 days
4	Thomas W. Morgan	Lieutenant General; Thomas W. Morgan (born 1922)	29 August 1975	28 April 1978	2 years, 242 days
5	Richard C. Henry	Lieutenant General; Richard C. Henry (1925–2020)	28 April 1978	30 September 1979	1 year, 155 days
Space Division
1	Richard C. Henry	Lieutenant General; Richard C. Henry (1925–2020)	1 October 1979	1 May 1983	3 years, 212 days
2	Forrest S. McCartney	Lieutenant General; Forrest S. McCartney (1931–2012)	1 May 1983	30 September 1986	3 years, 152 days
3	Aloysius G. Casey	Lieutenant General; Aloysius G. Casey (1932–2020)	9 October 1986	23 June 1988	1 year, 258 days
4	Donald L. Cromer	Lieutenant General; Donald L. Cromer (born 1936)	24 June 1988	14 March 1989	263 days
Space Systems Division
1	Donald L. Cromer	Lieutenant General; Donald L. Cromer (born 1936)	15 March 1989	31 May 1989	2 years, 77 days
2	Edward P. Barry Jr.	Lieutenant General; Edward P. Barry Jr. (born 1938)	8 July 1991	30 June 1992	358 days
Space and Missile Systems Center
1	Edward P. Barry Jr.	Lieutenant General; Edward P. Barry Jr. (born 1938)	1 July 1992	16 November 1994	2 years, 138 days
2	Lester L. Lyles	Lieutenant General; Lester L. Lyles (born 1946)	17 November 1994	18 August 1996	1 year, 275 days
3	Roger G. DeKok	Lieutenant General; Roger G. DeKok (1947–2003)	19 August 1996	12 August 1998	1 year, 358 days
4	Eugene L. Tattini	Lieutenant General; Eugene L. Tattini (born 1943)	13 August 1998	25 May 2001	2 years, 285 days
5	Brian A. Arnold	Lieutenant General; Brian A. Arnold (born 1946)	25 May 2001	20 May 2005	3 years, 360 days
6	Michael A. Hamel	Lieutenant General; Michael A. Hamel (born 1950)	20 May 2005	16 May 2008	2 years, 362 days
7	John T. Sheridan	Lieutenant General; John T. Sheridan	16 May 2008	3 June 2011	3 years, 18 days
8	Ellen M. Pawlikowski	Lieutenant General; Ellen M. Pawlikowski (born 1956)	3 June 2011	19 June 2014	3 years, 16 days
9	Samuel A. Greaves	Lieutenant General; Samuel A. Greaves	19 June 2014	22 March 2017	2 years, 276 days
10	John F. Thompson	Lieutenant General; John F. Thompson	22 March 2017	1 August 2021	4 years, 132 days
–	D. Jason Cothern	Brigadier General; D. Jason Cothern (born 1970); Acting	1 August 2021	13 August 2021	12 days
Space Systems Command
1	Michael A. Guetlein	Lieutenant General; Michael A. Guetlein (born 1967)	13 August 2021	21 December 2023	2 years, 130 days
2	Philip Garrant	Lieutenant General; Philip Garrant (born c. 1969)	1 February 2024	Incumbent	2 years, 279 days

== List of deputy commanders ==
No.	Deputy Commander		Term			Ref.
No.	Portrait	Name	Took office	Left office	Duration	Ref.
1	Osmond J. Ritland	Major General; Osmond J. Ritland (1909–1991)	23 April 1956	24 April 1959	3 years, 1 day	
2	Charles Terhune Jr.	Brigadier General; Charles Terhune Jr. (1916–2006)	25 April 1959	22 June 1960	1 year, 58 days	
3	Harvard W. Powell	Brigadier General; Harvard W. Powell (1915–2003)	23 June 1960	31 March 1961	281 days	
4	Robert Evans Greer	Major General; Robert Evans Greer (1915–1976)	1 April 1961	30 June 1962	1 year, 90 days	
5	Harvard W. Powell	Brigadier General; Harvard W. Powell (1915–2003)	1 July 1962	9 June 1963	343 days	
6	Joseph J. Cody	Brigadier General; Joseph J. Cody (1918–2004)	10 June 1963	31 July 1964	1 year, 51 days	
7	Paul T. Cooper	Brigadier General; Paul T. Cooper (born 1919)	1 August 1964	31 August 1966	2 years, 30 days	
8	David V. Miller	Brigadier General; David V. Miller (1919–2016)	1 September 1966	30 June 1967	−1 year, 32 days	
9	Paul T. Cooper	Major General; Paul T. Cooper (born 1919)	1 November 1967	31 July 1968	273 days	
10	Louis L. Wilson Jr.	Brigadier General; Louis L. Wilson Jr. (1919–2010)	1 August 1968	31 July 1970	1 year, 364 days	
11	Robert A. Duffy	Brigadier General; Robert A. Duffy (1921–2015)	1 August 1970	31 July 1971	364 days	
12	Thomas W. Morgan	Brigadier General; Thomas W. Morgan (born 1922)	1 August 1971	12 November 1972	1 year, 103 days	
13	Herbert A. Lyon	Brigadier General; Herbert A. Lyon (1921–2006)	13 November 1972	29 March 1974	1 year, 136 days	
14	Richard C. Henry	Major General; Richard C. Henry (1925–2020)	16 August 1974	31 August 1976	2 years, 15 days	
15	Howard E. McCormick	Major General; Howard E. McCormick (born 1922)	1 September 1976	1 July 1978	1 year, 303 days	
16	Gerald K. Hendricks	Major General; Gerald K. Hendricks (1928–2020)	1 July 1978	1 June 1982	3 years, 335 days	
17	Forrest S. McCartney	Major General; Forrest S. McCartney (1931–2012)	1 June 1982	1 May 1983	334 days	
18	Bernard P. Randolph	Major General; Bernard P. Randolph (1933–2021)	1 May 1983	10 June 1984	1 year, 40 days	
19	Donald L. Cromer	Brigadier General; Donald L. Cromer (born 1936)	7 January 1985	30 June 1986	1 year, 174 days	
20	Donald J. Kutyna	Lieutenant General; Donald J. Kutyna (born 1933)	1 June 1986	1 November 1987	1 year, 153 days	
21	Robert R. Rankine Jr.	Major General; Robert R. Rankine Jr. (born 1936)	1 November 1987	30 March 1990	2 years, 149 days	
22	Jean E. Klick	Brigadier General; Jean E. Klick (born 1943)	31 March 1990	8 July 1991	1 year, 99 days	
23	Eugene L. Tattini	Brigadier General; Eugene L. Tattini (born 1943)	3 September 1991	2 December 1994	3 years, 90 days	
24	John S. Boone	Colonel; John S. Boone (born c. 1946)	27 November 1995	21 July 1996	237 days	
25	John L. Clay	Brigadier General; John L. Clay (born c. 1949)	22 July 1996	21 August 1998	2 years, 30 days	
26	Michael A. Hamel	Brigadier General; Michael A. Hamel (born c. 1950)	21 August 1998	18 August 1999	362 days	
27	William M. Wilson Jr.	Brigadier General; William M. Wilson Jr. (born c. 1951)	19 August 1999	19 October 2001	2 years, 61 days	
28	Craig R. Cooning	Major General; Craig R. Cooning (born c. 1951)	20 October 2001	23 June 2004	2 years, 247 days	
29	Larry D. James	Brigadier General; Larry D. James (born 1956)	6 July 2004	July 2005	~1 year, 9 days	
30	Neil McCasland	Brigadier General; Neil McCasland (born c. 1957)	October 2005	1 June 2007	~1 year, 229 days	
31	Ellen M. Pawlikowski	Brigadier General; Ellen M. Pawlikowski (born 1956)	10 July 2007	May 2008	~310 days	
32	Susan K. Mashiko	Brigadier General; Susan K. Mashiko (born c. 1958)	May 2008	July 2009	~1 year, 61 days	
33	Samuel Greaves	Brigadier General; Samuel Greaves (born c. 1960)	August 2009	February 2011	~1 year, 184 days	
34	Roger Teague	Brigadier General; Roger Teague (born c. 1964)	June 2011	August 2012	~1 year, 61 days	
35	Terrence Feehan	Major General; Terrence Feehan (born c. 1962)	August 2012	May 2014	~1 year, 273 days	
36	Robert McMurry	Major General; Robert McMurry (born c. 1962)	May 2014	April 2016	~1 year, 336 days	
37	Mark Baird	Brigadier General; Mark Baird (born c. 1967)	April 2016	June 2017	~1 year, 61 days	
38	Philip Garrant	Brigadier General; Philip Garrant (born c. 1969)	June 2017	June 2019	~2 years	
39	Donna D. Shipton	Brigadier General; Donna D. Shipton (born c. 1970)	June 2019	8 June 2020	~359 days	
40	D. Jason Cothern	Major General; D. Jason Cothern (born 1970)	8 June 2020	8 January 2024	3 years, 214 days	
41	Michelle K. Idle	Colonel; Michelle K. Idle (born c. 1971)	8 January 2024	~30 June 2025	~1 year, 173 days	
42	Andrew S. Menschner	Colonel; Andrew S. Menschner (born c. 1979)	~30 June 2025	Incumbent	~1 year, 130 days	

== List of senior enlisted leaders ==
No.	Senior Enlisted Leader		Term			Ref.
No.	Portrait	Name	Took office	Left office	Duration	Ref.
–	Steven F. Crocker	Chief Master Sergeant; Steven F. Crocker	June 2005	June 2008	~3 years, 0 days	
–	Stephen R. Ludwig	Chief Master Sergeant; Stephen R. Ludwig (born c. 1966)	June 2008	November 2009	~1 year, 153 days	
–	Mark E. Repp	Chief Master Sergeant; Mark E. Repp	December 2009	February 2012	~2 years, 62 days	
–	Carol A.M. Dockery	Chief Master Sergeant; Carol A.M. Dockery (born c. 1965)	February 2012	September 2013	~1 year, 212 days	
–	Angelica M. Johnson	Chief Master Sergeant; Angelica M. Johnson	September 2013	October 2014	~1 year, 30 days	
–	Craig S. Hall	Chief Master Sergeant; Craig S. Hall	October 2014	January 2019	~4 years, 92 days	
–	Lisa R. Arnold	Chief Master Sergeant; Lisa R. Arnold (born c. 1975)	January 2019	June 2021	~2 years, 151 days	
–	Willie H. Frazier II	Chief Master Sergeant; Willie H. Frazier II (c. 1976–2024)	June 2021	15 December 2023	~2 years, 183 days	
–	Jacqueline Sauvé	Chief Master Sergeant; Jacqueline Sauvé (born c. 1985)	15 December 2023	17 July 2026	2 years, 214 days	
–	Kevin W. Ryan Jr.	Chief Master Sergeant; Kevin W. Ryan Jr. (born c. 1988)	17 July 2026	Incumbent	113 days	

== See also ==
- Space Systems Command
- Commander of Space Operations Command
- Commander of Space Training and Readiness Command
