= Samuel Greaves =

U.S. Air Force general

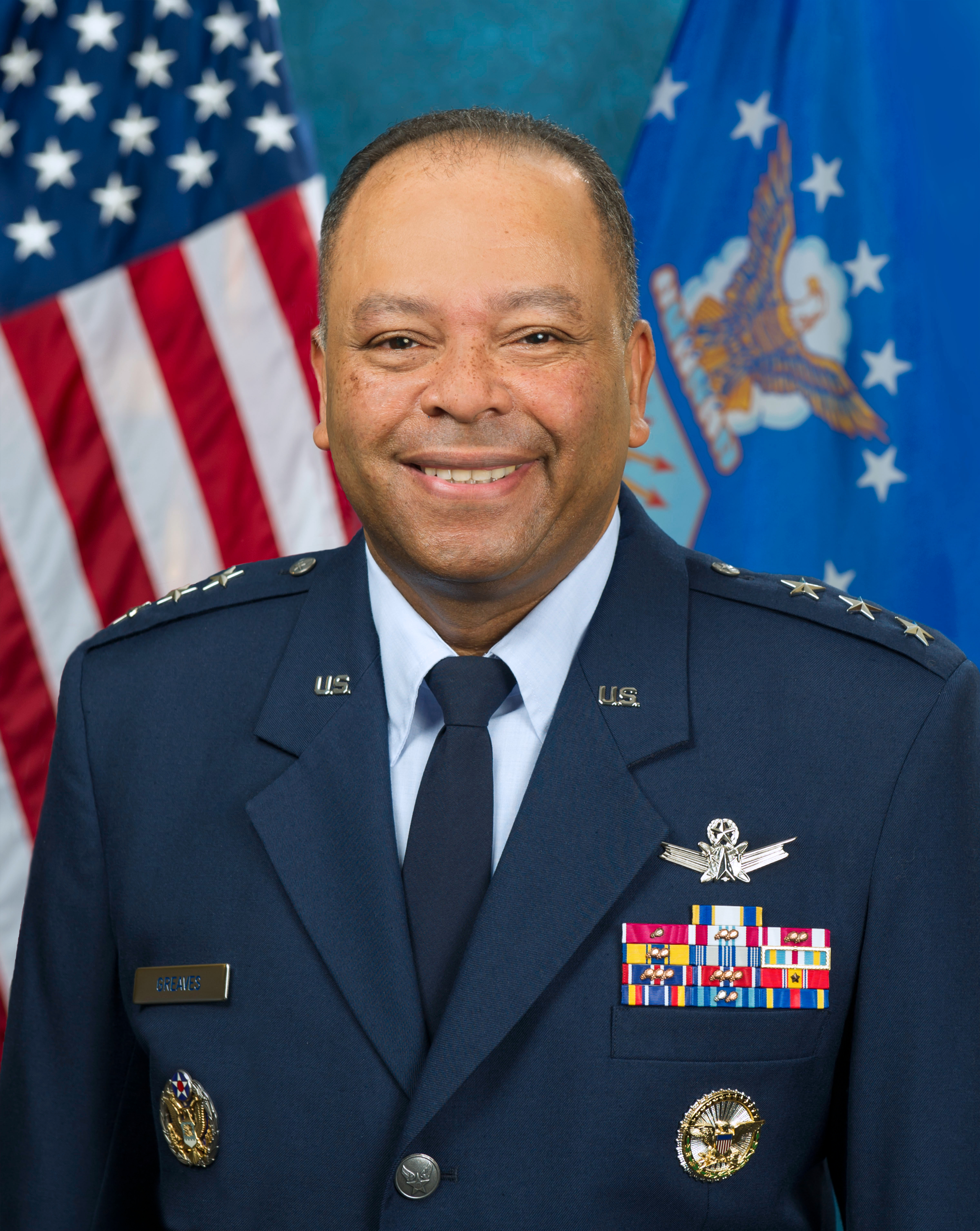
- Official portrait, 2014
- Military career
- Allegiance: United States
- Branch: United States Air Force
- Service years: 1982–2019
- Rank: Lieutenant General
- Commands: Missile Defense Agency; Space and Missile Systems Center; Military Satellite Communications Systems Wing; Launch and Range Systems Wing; 45th Launch Group; Air Force Communications Support Facility
- Awards: Air Force Distinguished Service Medal; Defense Superior Service Medal; Legion of Merit (2)

Samuel A. Greaves is a retired United States Air Force Lieutenant General who is now a vice president and the chief architect for space and launch at Boeing. In the U.S. Air Force, he last served as the Commander of the Missile Defense Agency. Prior to that, he was the Commander of the Space and Missile Systems Center.

Military offices
Preceded by Susan K. Mashiko	Vice Commander of the Space and Missile Systems Center; 2009–2011	Succeeded by Roger W. Teague
Preceded by John W. Raymond	Director of Strategic Plans, Programs, and Analyses of the Air Force Space Command; 2011–2012	Succeeded by Roger W. Teague
Preceded by ???	Deputy Director of the Missile Defense Agency; 2012–2014	Succeeded by Kenneth E. Todorov
Preceded by Ellen M. Pawlikowski	Commander of the Space and Missile Systems Center; 2014–2017	Succeeded by John F. Thompson
Preceded by James D. Syring	Director of the Missile Defense Agency; 2017–2019	Succeeded by Jon A. Hill
