= Richard Henry =

Richard Henry may refer to:

- Richard Henry (pseudonym), pseudonym credited on collaborative works of authors Richard Butler and Henry Chance Newton
- Richard Bullock Henry (1930–2010), black activist better known as Imari Obadele
- Richard Henry (conservationist) (1845–1929), New Zealand naturalist and conservationist
- Richard C. Henry (born 1925), United States Air Force general
- Richard Conn Henry (born 1940), professor of physics and astronomy at Johns Hopkins University

== See also ==
marriage
