= Ellen M. Pawlikowski =

United States Air Force general

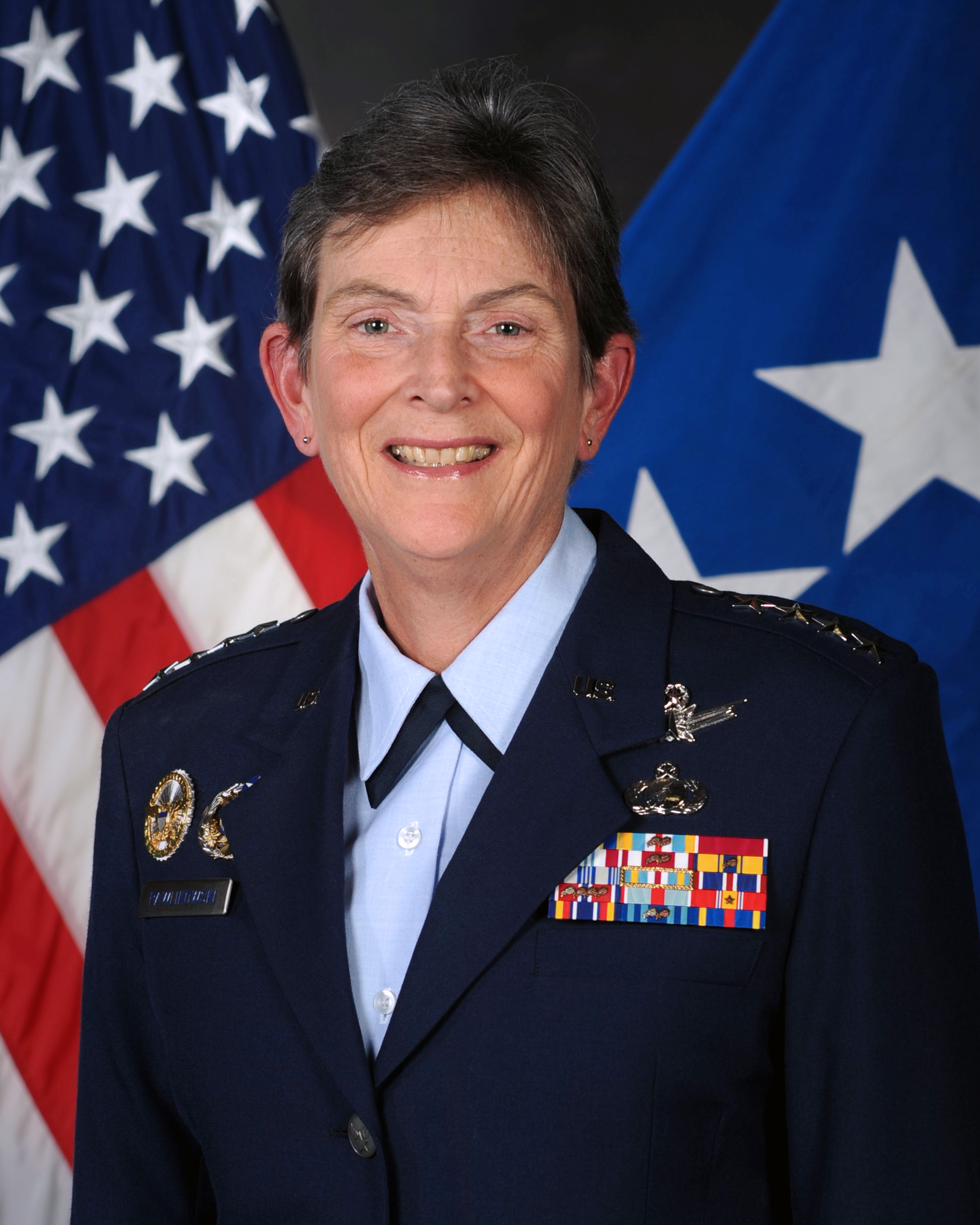
- General Ellen M. Pawlikowski
- Born: 1956 (age 69–70); East Orange, New Jersey, U.S.
- Military career
- Allegiance: United States
- Branch: United States Air Force
- Service years: 1978–2018
- Rank: General
- Commands: Air Force Materiel Command; Space and Missile Systems Center; Air Force Research Laboratory; Military Satellite Communications Systems Wing
- Awards: Air Force Distinguished Service Medal; Defense Superior Service Medal (3); Legion of Merit

Ellen Marie Pawlikowski (born 1956) is a retired four-star general of the United States Air Force. She last served as the commander of Air Force Materiel Command at Wright-Patterson Air Force Base from June 8, 2015, to the end of July 2018, managing some 80,000 people and $60 billion in Air Force programs annually. Pawlikowski retired from the Air Force on September 1, 2018, after 40 years of service. She currently serves on the board of directors for Raytheon Technologies, one of the largest aerospace and defense companies in the world, and is a Judge Widney Professor at the University of Southern California's Viterbi School of Engineering.

== Military career ==
Born in East Orange, New Jersey and raised in Bloomfield, New Jersey, Pawlikowski entered the United States Air Force in 1978 through the ROTC program at New Jersey Institute of Technology after graduating with a Bachelor of Science in chemical engineering. She then attended the University of California, Berkeley, where she received a Doctorate of Philosophy in chemical engineering in December 1981, entering active duty at McClellan AFB, California, in April 1982.

Pawlikowski served as Director of the Acquisition Management Office for the Assistant Secretary of Defense for Atomic Energy and as Deputy Assistant to the Secretary of Defense for Counterproliferation. Her leadership assignments have included Program Director of the Airborne Laser program, commander of the Military Satellite Communications Systems Wing, Deputy Director of the National Reconnaissance Office, commander of the Air Force Research Laboratory, and commander of the Space and Missile Systems Center.

On February 18, 2015, the President of the United States nominated Pawlikowski for promotion to general and as assignment as commander of the Air Force Materiel Command. Pawlikoski's promotion and assignment to AFMC were confirmed by the United States Senate on March 27, 2015. On June 8, Pawlikowski assumed command of Air Force Materiel Command from General Janet C. Wolfenbarger.

== Post-military career ==
Following her retirement from the United States Air Force on 9 August 2018, Pawlikowski accepted a place on the Board of Directors of Raytheon in September. Pawlikowski was elected a member of the National Academy of Engineering in 2014 for leadership in the development of technologies for national security programs including spacecraft operations and the Airborne Laser. As of August 2019, she serves as a Judge Widney Professor at the University of Southern California Viterbi School of Engineering.

== Major awards and decorations ==
Her major awards and decorations include:

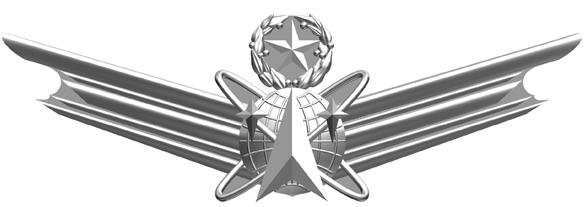
Master Space Operations Badge
Air Force Master Acquisition and Financial Management Badge
Office of the Secretary of Defense Identification Badge
Headquarters Air Force Badge

Air Force Distinguished Service Medal
Defense Superior Service Medal with two bronze oak leaf clusters
Legion of Merit
Defense Meritorious Service Medal
Meritorious Service Medal with two bronze oak leaf clusters
Air Force Commendation Medal with one oak leaf cluster
Air Force Achievement Medal
Joint Meritorious Unit Award
Air Force Outstanding Unit Award
Air Force Organizational Excellence Award with one silver and three bronze oak leaf clusters
Air Force Recognition Ribbon
National Defense Service Medal with one bronze service star
Global War on Terrorism Service Medal
Air Force Longevity Service Award with one silver and three bronze oak leaf clusters
Air Force Longevity Service Award (second ribbon to denote tenth award)
Air Force Training Ribbon

== Dates of promotion ==
- Second Lieutenant – May 25, 1978
- First Lieutenant – May 25, 1981
- Captain – May 25, 1983
- Major – March 1, 1988
- Lieutenant Colonel – April 1, 1992
- Colonel – October 1, 1996
- Brigadier General – June 1, 2005
- Major General – July 22, 2008
- Lieutenant General – June 3, 2011
- General – June 8, 2015

== See also ==
- List of female United States military generals and flag officers

Military offices
Preceded by John T. Sheridan	Deputy Director of the National Reconnaissance Office; 2008–2010	Succeeded by Susan K. Mashiko
Preceded by Curtis Bedke	Commander of the Air Force Research Laboratory; 2010–2011	Succeeded by Neil McCasland
Preceded by John T. Sheridan	Commander of the Space and Missile Systems Center; 2011–2014	Succeeded by Samuel Greaves
Preceded by Janet C. Wolfenbarger	Military Deputy to the Assistant Secretary of the Air Force for Acquisition, Technology & Logistics; 2014–2015	Succeeded by Arnold W. Bunch Jr.
Preceded by Janet C. Wolfenbarger	Commander of the Air Force Materiel Command; 2015–2018	Succeeded by Robert D. McMurry
