= D. Jason Cothern =

U.S. Space Force general

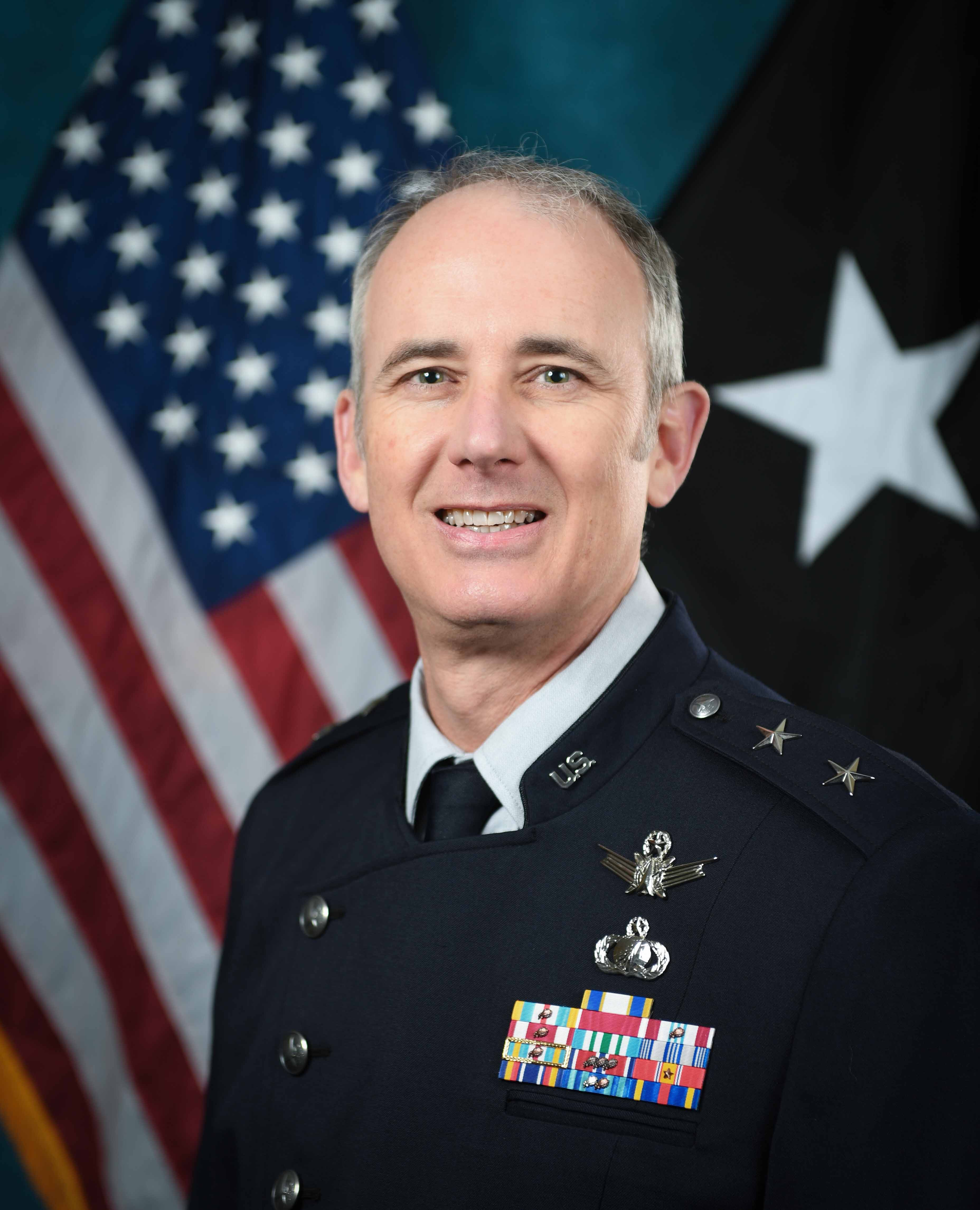
- Official portrait, 2026
- Born: November 12, 1970 (age 55)
- Education: University of Central Florida (BS): California State University, Long Beach (MBA); George Washington University (MS)
- Military career
- Allegiance: United States
- Branch: United States Air Force: United States Space Force
- Service years: 1993–2021 (Air Force): 2021–present (Space Force)
- Rank: Major General
- Commands: Space Systems Command (acting); Space Based Infrared Systems Ground Squadron
- Awards: Defense Superior Service Medal: Legion of Merit

Donald Jason Cothern (born November 12, 1970) is a United States Space Force major general who serves as the Missile Defense Agency Deputy Director and Program Executive for Ground-based Midcourse Defense. He previously served as the deputy commander of the Space Systems Command. He transferred to the Space Force from the United States Air Force in May 2021.

Prior to his current assignment, he was the assistant program director for development at the F-35 Lighting II Joint Program Office, where he was responsible for F-35 fighter fifth generation modernization activities.

Cothern was commissioned in 1993 as an ROTC graduate of the University of Central Florida. He served as the director of the Department of Defense’s Space Test Program and the Air Force's Hosted Payloads Office. As STP director, he also led the Rocket Systems Launch Program, where he was mission director for the DoD's first SpaceX Falcon 9 launch that flew NASA and National Oceanic and Atmospheric Administration's Deep Space Climate Observatory (DSCOVR) satellite in February 2015.

In July 2023, Cothern was nominated for promotion to major general.

== Education ==
- 1993 Bachelor of Science, aerospace engineering, University of Central Florida, Orlando
- 1998 Squadron Officer School, Maxwell Air Force Base, Ala.
- 2000 Master of Business Administration, California State University, Long Beach
- 2002 Master of Science, Organizational Leadership, The George Washington University, Washington, D.C.
- 2006 Master of Military Operational Arts and Science, Air Command and Staff College, Air University, Maxwell AFB, Ala.
- 2009 Air War College, Maxwell AFB, Ala., by correspondence
- 2009 The Program Manager's Course, Defense Acquisition University, Fort Belvoir, Va.
- 2012 Master of National Resource Strategy, The Industrial College of the Armed Forces, National Defense University, Fort Lesley J. McNair, Washington, D.C.

== Assignments ==
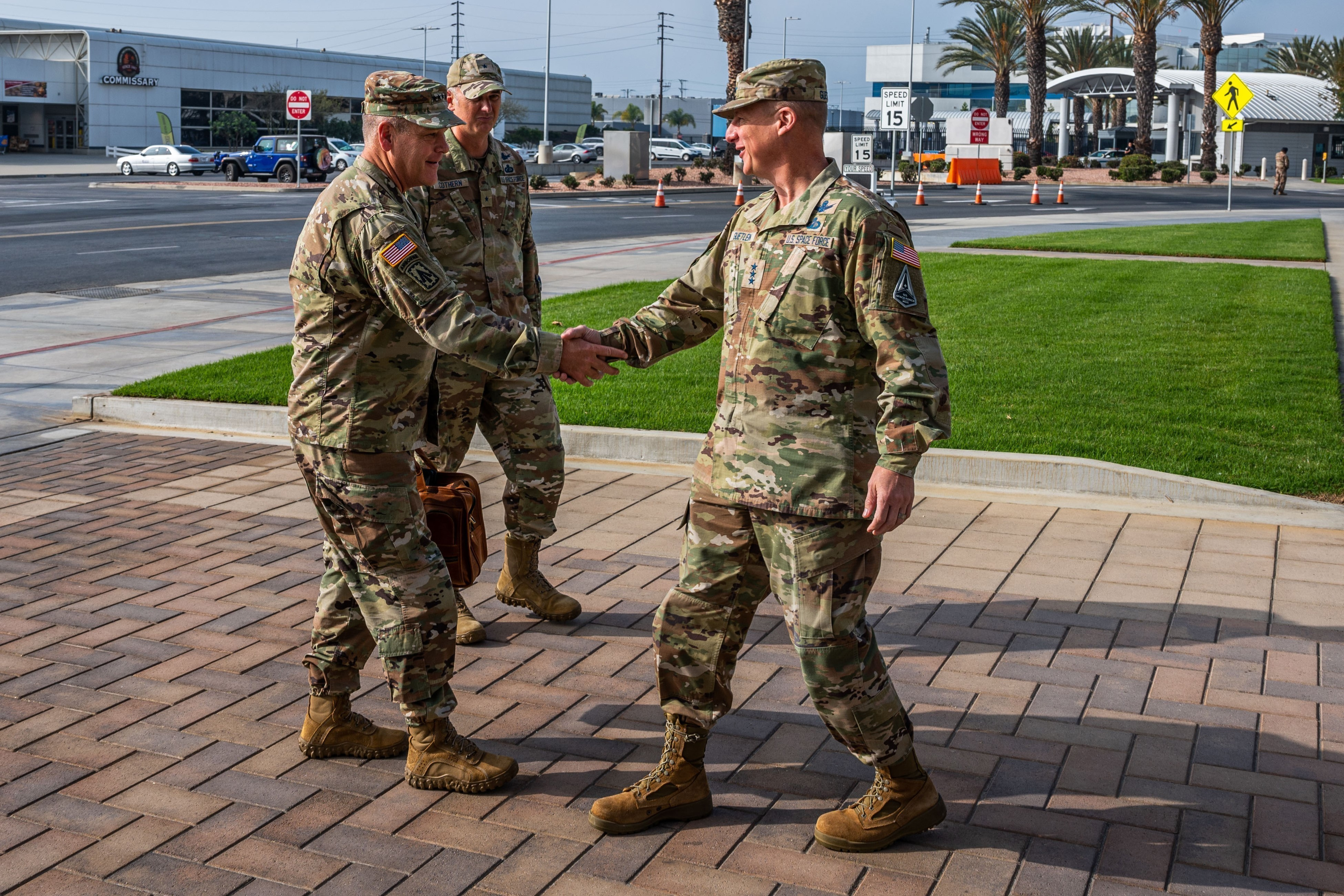
Cothern welcomes Gen James H. Dickinson to Space Systems Command, 2021

1. September 1993–August 1995, Program Manager, 50th Logistics Support Squadron, Schreiver Air Force Base, Colo.
2. August 1995–July 1996, Executive Officer, 50th Logistics Group, Schreiver AFB, Colo.
3. July 1996–March 1998, Program Manager, Milstar Operations Support Division, Military Satellite Communications Joint Program Office, Space and Missile Systems Center, Los Angeles AFB, Calif.
4. March 1998–July 2000, Chief, Military Satellite Communications Programs Planning Branch, Military Satellite Communications Joint Program Office, Space and Missile Systems Center, Los Angeles AFB, Calif.
5. July 2000–June 2002, Student, United States Air Force Intern Program, Headquarters U.S. Air Force, the Pentagon, Arlington, Va.
6. June 2002–July 2005, Chief, Satellite Command and Control Branch, then Program Manager, Missile Warning Systems, Space Systems Program Office, Signals Intelligence Directorate, National Reconnaissance Office, Chantilly, Va.
7. July 2005–June 2006, Student, Air Command and Staff College, Maxwell AFB, Ala.
8. June 2006–June 2008, Deputy Chief, Future Systems Division, Developmental Planning Directorate, Space and Missiles System Center, Los Angeles AFB, Calif.
9. June 2008–July 2009, Chief, Space Systems Acquisition Division, Transformational Satellite Communications System Space Group, MILSATCOM Systems Wing, Space and Missiles System Center, Los Angeles AFB, Calif.
10. July 2009–August 2011, Commander, Space Based Infrared Systems Ground Squadron, then Materiel Leader, SBIRS Ground Systems Branch, SBIRS Ground Division, Infrared Space Systems Directorate, Space and Missile Systems Center, Los Angeles AFB, Calif.
11. August 2011–June 2012, Student, Industrial College of the Armed Forces, National Defense University, Fort Lesley J. McNair, Washington, D.C.
12. June 2012–July 2014, Chief, Requirements Integration Department, Defense Threat Reduction Agency and U.S. Strategic Command, Center for Combating Weapons of Mass Destruction, Fort Belvoir, Va.
13. July 2014–June 2017, Senior Material Leader – Lower, Director, DoD Space Test Program and Chief, Space Demonstrations Division, Advanced Systems and Development Directorate, Space and Missile Systems Center, Kirtland AFB, N.M.
14. June 2017–June 2020, Senior Material Leader – Upper, Assistant Program Director for Development and Production, then Assistant Program Director for Development, F-35 Joint Program Office, Arlington, Va.
15. June 2020– August 2021, Vice Commander, Space and Missile Systems Center, U.S. Space Force, Los Angeles AFB, Calif.
16. August 2021 – January 2024, Deputy Commander, Space Systems Command, Los Angeles AFB, Calif.
17. February 2024 – present, Program Executive for Ground-Based Weapon Systems, Missile Defense Agency, Redstone Arsenal, Ala.

== Awards and decorations ==
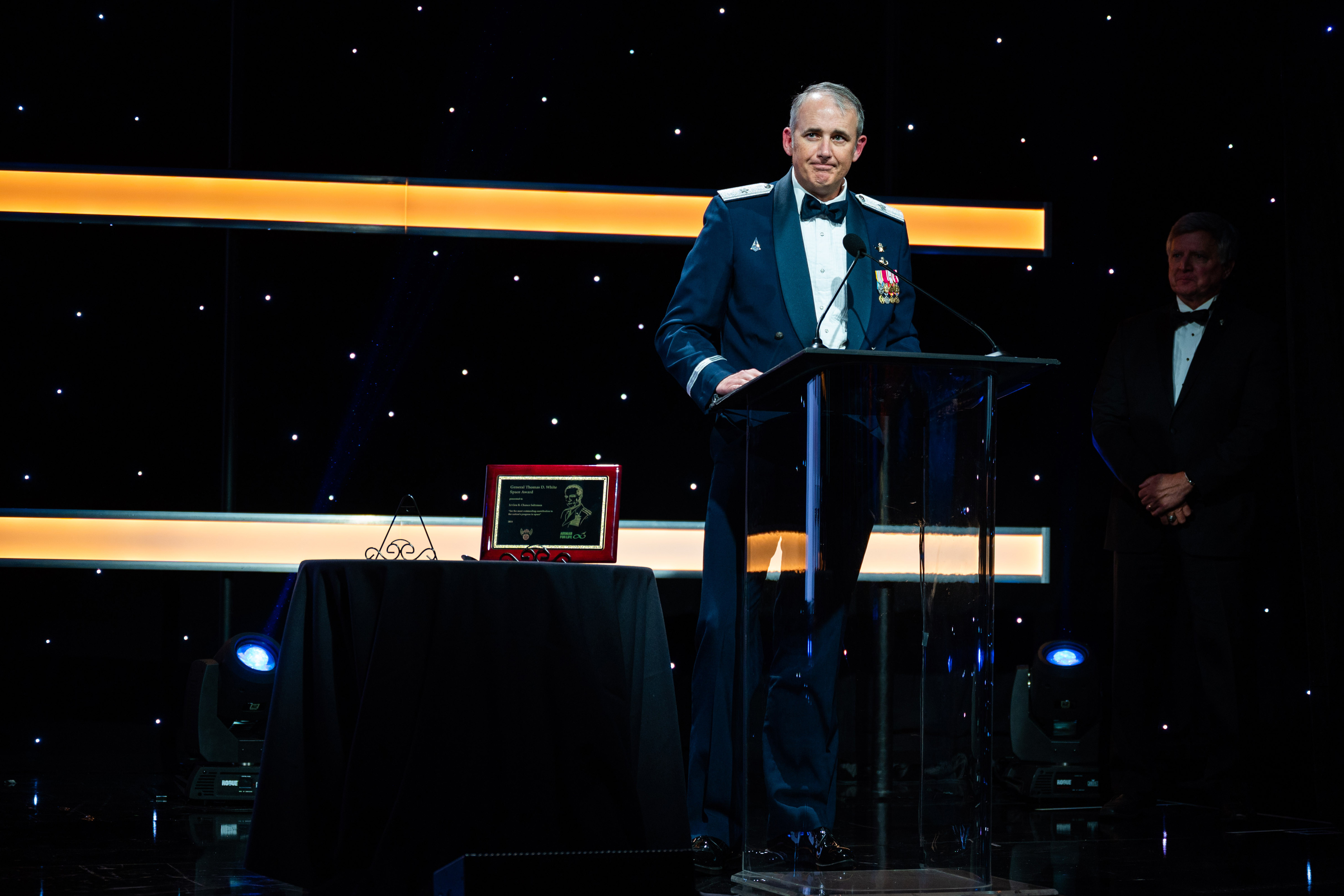
Cothern speaks after winning the Schriever Fellowship Award during the Air Force Association's Inaugural Space Force Ball, 2021

Cothern is the recipient of the following awards:

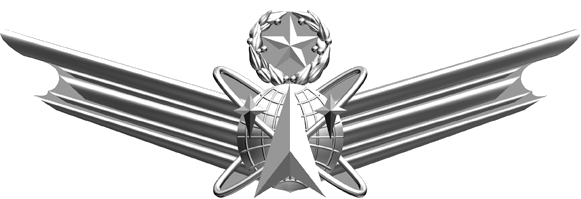

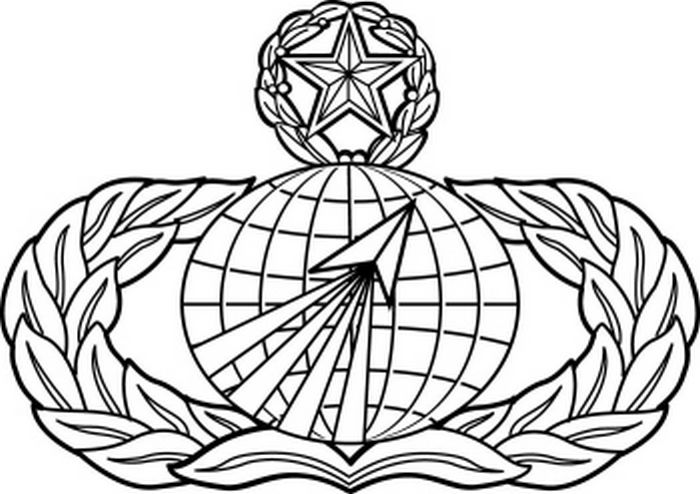

Command Space Operations Badge
Air Force Master Acquisition and Financial Management Badge

Defense Superior Service Medal
Legion of Merit
Defense Meritorious Service Medal with one bronze oak leaf cluster
Meritorious Service Medal with one bronze oak leaf
Joint Service Commendation Medal
Air Force Achievement Medal
Joint Meritorious Unit Award with one bronze oak leaf cluster
Air Force Organizational Excellence Award with three bronze oak leaf clusters
National Defense Service Medal with one bronze service star
Nuclear Deterrence Operations Service Medal
Air Force Longevity Service Award with one silver oak leaf cluster
Air Force Training Ribbon

== Dates of promotion ==
Rank	Branch	Date
Second Lieutenant	Air Force	July 22, 1993
First Lieutenant	Air Force	July 22, 1995
Captain	Air Force	July 22, 1997
Major	Air Force	December 1, 2003
Lieutenant Colonel	Air Force	June 1, 2008
Colonel	Air Force	October 1, 2013
Brigadier General	Air Force	July 3, 2019
Brigadier General	Space Force	~April 29, 2021
Major General	Space Force	December 6, 2023

Military offices
Preceded by Donna D. Shipton	Program Executive Officer for Space Enterprise of the United States Space Force and Director of the Enterprise Corps of the Space and Missile Systems Center; 2020–2021	Succeeded by Timothy Sejba
Preceded by John F. Thompson	Commander of the Space and Missile Systems Center; Acting; 2021	Succeeded by Michael Guetlein as Commander of the Space Systems Command
New title	Program Executive Officer for Assured Access to Space of the United States Space Force; 2021–2022	Succeeded by Stephen G. Purdy
Preceded by Donna D. Shipton	Deputy Commander of Space Systems Command; 2020–2024	Succeeded by Michelle K. Idle
Preceded by Heath Collins	Program Executive for Ground-based Weapon Systems of the Missile Defense Agency; 2024–present	Incumbent
