= Milstar =

Constellation of American military satellites

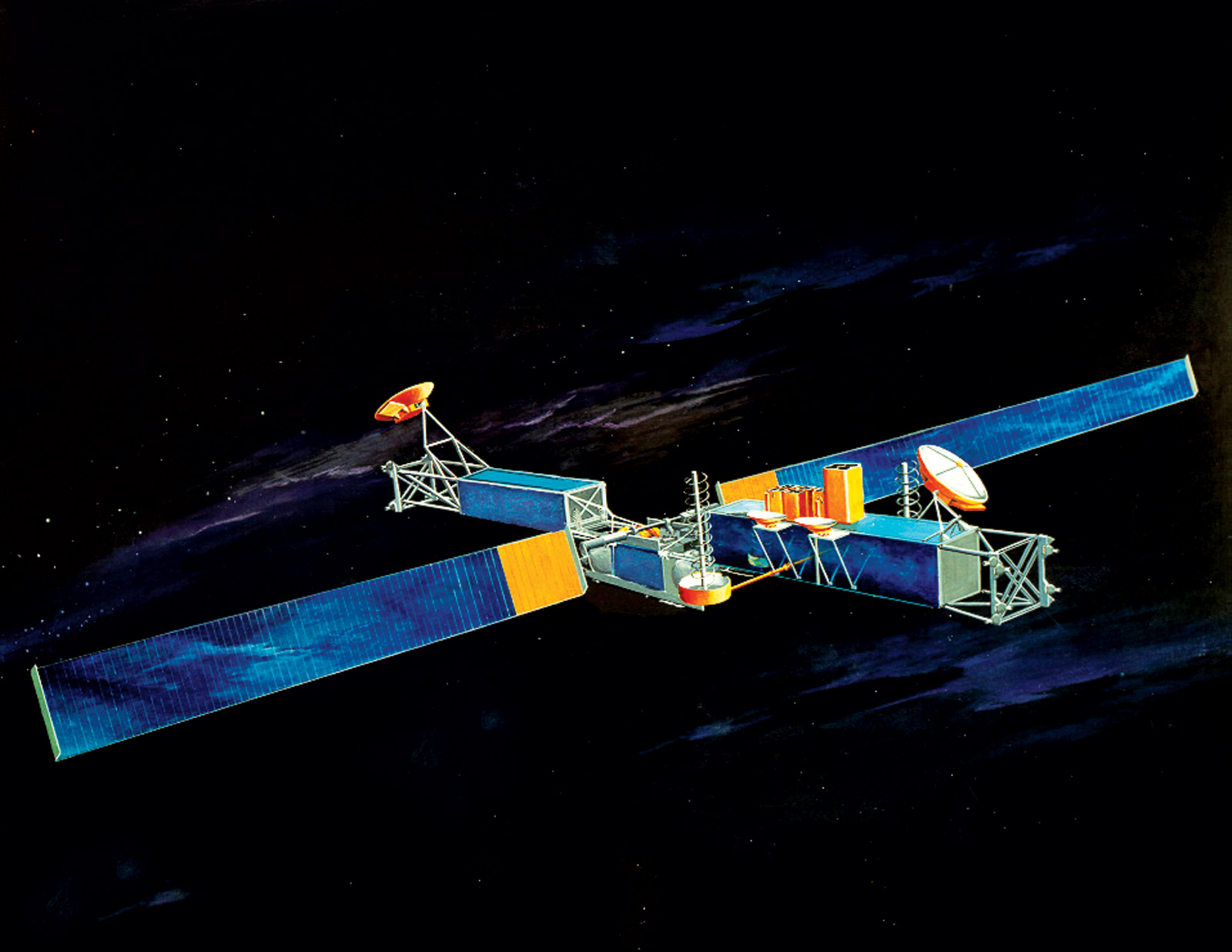
- Artist's impression of a Milstar Block I spacecraft
- Manufacturer: Lockheed Martin (prime, formerly Lockheed Missiles and Space); Northrop Grumman (formerly TRW); Boeing (formerly Hughes)
- Country of origin: United States
- Operator: U.S. Space Force
- Applications: Military communications

Specifications
- Bus: Milstar Block I Milstar Block II
- Launch mass: 4,500 kilograms (9,900 lb)
- Regime: Geosynchronous
- Design life: 10 years

Production
- Status: Out of production Active
- Built: 6
- Launched: 6
- Operational: 5
- Lost: 1
- Maiden launch: USA-99, 1994-02-07
- Last launch: USA-169, 2003-04-08

Milstar (Military Strategic and Tactical Relay) is a constellation of military communications satellites in geosynchronous orbit, which are operated by the United States Space Force, and provide secure and jam-resistant worldwide communications to meet the requirements of the Armed Forces of the United States. Six spacecraft were launched between 1994 and 2003, of which only five were operational after launch; the third launch failed, both damaging the satellite and leaving it in an unusable orbit.

== History ==
Milstar Block I spacecraft, or Milstar Developmental Flight Satellite (DFS)-1 and -2, were designed with a Low Data Rate (LDR) payload in the +X wing of the satellite that broadcast in the Super High Frequency (SHF) and Extremely High Frequency (EHF) ranges, and also a classified communication payload in the -X wing. The DFS-1 satellite was launched on 7 February 1994 aboard the first Titan IV(401)A rocket, but with the classified -X wing payload deactivated. It was followed by the DFS-2 spacecraft on 7 November 1995. DFS-2 was similar to DFS-1, but the classified payload was replaced by ballast in the form of a precision machined aluminum block to maintain the weight and balance characteristics of the satellite. Both Block I satellites (USA-99 and USA-115) are still operational as of March 2025, over 30 years since they were launched.

The four later satellites were Block II spacecraft, which featured an additional medium data-rate payload. The first Block II satellite (DFS-3m, a hybrid mix of largely Block I support systems and LDR payload and a MDR (Medium Data Rate) Block II payload) was launched on 30 April 1999, using a Titan IV(401)B rocket. Due to a database error affecting the attitude control system of the Centaur upper stage of its carrier rocket, it was placed into a lower orbit than had been planned, and damaged by deployment at excessive rates. It could not be raised into its operational orbit due to fuel limitations. Its orbit was raised as much as possible to increase the expected lifetime and then it was permanently turned off after 10 days. It was the third consecutive, and last, failure of a Titan IV rocket. The remaining three satellites (DFS-4, -5, and -6) were launched on 27 February 2001, 15 January 2002, and 8 April 2003.

The Milstar system consists of three segments; the space segment which consists of the six satellites, ground terminals and users, and stations to command and control the satellites. The Military Satellite Communications Systems Wing (MCSW) division of the Space and Missile Systems Center, located at Los Angeles AFB was responsible for development and acquisition of the Milstar space and mission control segments. The Electronic Systems Center at Hanscom AFB is responsible for the US Air Force portion of the terminal segment development and acquisition. The 4th Space Operations Squadron at Schriever SFB and the 148th Space Operations Squadron at Vandenberg SFB are responsible for providing real-time satellite control and communications payload management.

In August 2010 control of the Milstar system was transferred to the Advanced Extremely High Frequency program, in preparation for the launch of the first AEHF satellite, USA-214. Advanced Extremely High Frequency satellites are intended to replace Milstar.

== Characteristics ==
Milstar satellites provide secure, jam resistant, worldwide communications to meet the requirements of the United States military. They were built by Lockheed Martin Missiles and Space Corporation, at a cost of US$800 million each. Each satellite has a design life of 10 years. Six were built, of which five reached their operational geosynchronous orbits, and remain in service. Launches were made using Titan IV rockets with Centaur upper stages, and all six occurred from Space Launch Complex 40 at the Cape Canaveral Air Force Station. The satellites are designed to provide communications which are hard to detect and intercept, and to be survivable in the event of nuclear warfare.

The spacecraft have a mass of 4,500 kilograms (9,900 lb), and are equipped with solar panels which generate eight kilowatts of electric power to power its transponders. Both Block I and Block II satellites provide low data-rate communications at bandwidths between 75 bit/s and 2,400 bit/s, whilst the Block II spacecraft can also provide medium data-rate communications between 4.8 kbit/s and 1.544 Mbit/s. The satellites' uplinks operate in the Q band, while their downlinks operate within the K band. The uplink corresponds to the extremely high frequency band while downlink corresponds to the super high frequency radio band.

=== Spacecraft ===
USA ID	Name	Block	Launch date/time (UTC)	COSPAR ID	Rocket	Remarks
USA-99	DFS-1	Block I	1994-02-07, 21:47:01	1994-009A	Titan IV(401)A	
USA-115	DFS-2	Block I	1995-11-06, 05:15:01	1995-060A	Titan IV(401)A	
USA-143	DFS-3M	Block I/II hybrid	1999-04-30, 16:30:00	1999-023A	Titan IV(401)B	Launch failure
USA-157	DFS-4	Block II	2001-02-27, 21:20	2001-009A	Titan IV(401)B	
USA-164	DFS-5	Block II	2002-01-16, 00:30:00	2002-001A	Titan IV(401)B	
USA-169	DFS-6	Block II	2003-04-08, 13:43:00	2003-012A	Titan IV(401)B	

== See also ==
- Advanced Extremely High Frequency
- Defense Satellite Communications System
- Transformational Satellite Communications System
- Wideband Global SATCOM system
