= Susan K. Mashiko =

11th vice chairman of the Joint Chiefs of Staff (born 1958)

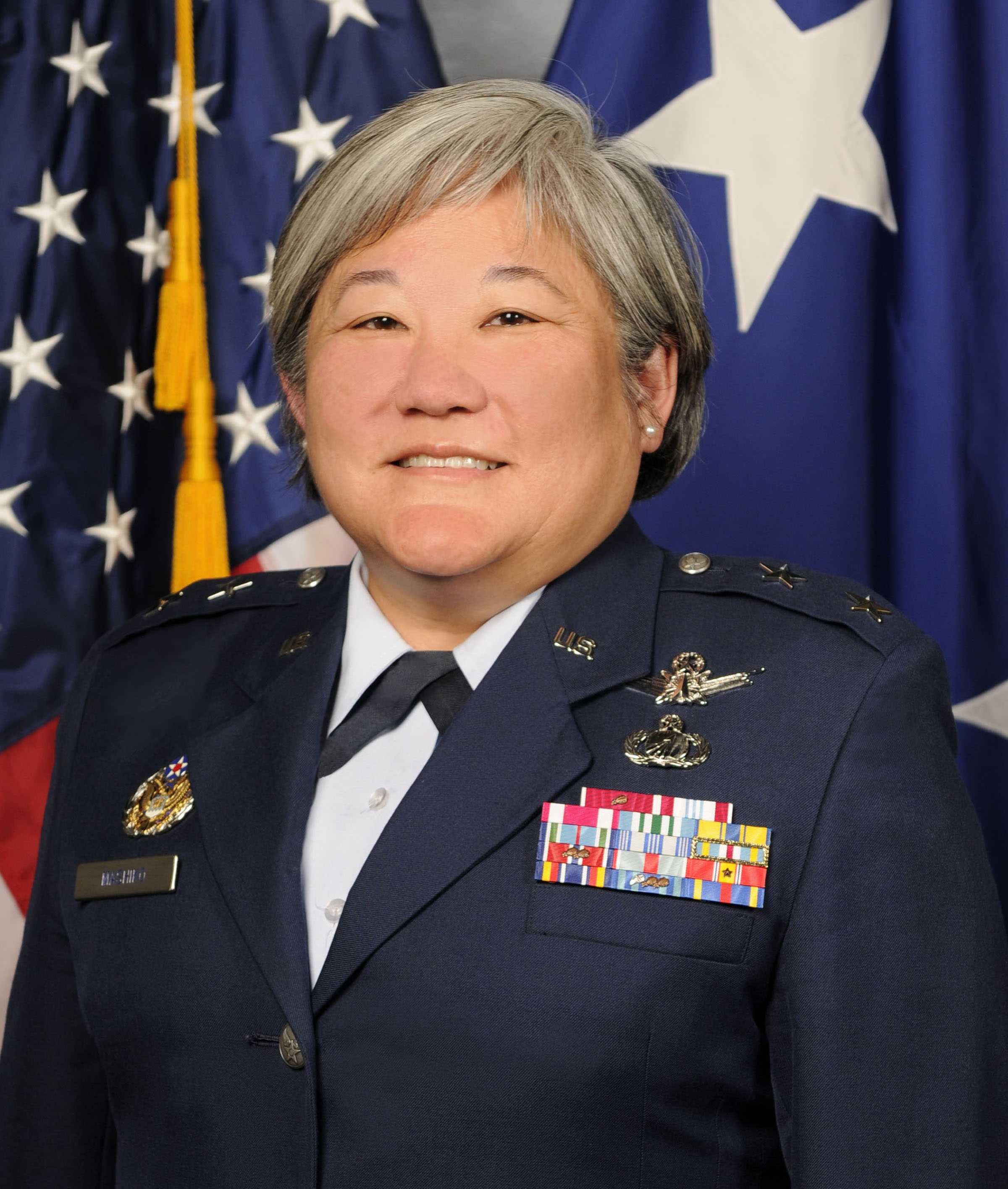
- Born: Glendale, California, U.S.
- Alma mater: U.S. Air Force Academy (BS); Air Force Institute of Technology (MS)
- Military career
- Allegiance: United States
- Branch: United States Air Force
- Service years: 1980–2013
- Rank: Major General
- Commands: Deputy Directors of National Reconnaissance Office; Director for Space Acquisition of the Office of the Under Secretary of the Air Force; Vice Commander of the Space and Missile Systems Center; Commander of the Military Satellite Communications Systems Wing
- Awards: Legion of Merit (2); Defense Meritorious Service Medal; Meritorious Service Medal

Susan K. Mashiko is a retired United States Air Force major general who served as the Deputy Director, National Reconnaissance Office, Chantilly, Virginia. Her responsibilities include assisting the director and principal deputy director in managing the strategic and tactical operations of the NRO. Also, as the commander, Air Force Space Command Element, she manages all air force personnel and resources assigned to the NRO and serves as the senior adviser to the DNRO on all military matters. Mashiko is the first Japanese American woman to be promoted to flag rank.

== Early life ==
Mashiko was born in Glendale, California.

== Education ==
Mashiko earned a bachelor's degree in aeronautical engineering from U.S. Air Force Academy. In 1986, Mashiko earned a Master of Science degree in Electrical Engineering from Air Force Institute of Technology.

== Career ==
Mashiko's career has spanned a wide variety of space and acquisition assignments, including chief of the Programs Division in the Office of Special Projects, executive officer to the Department of Defense Space Architect, and Director of the Evolved Expendable Launch Vehicle System Program. She has also served as the program executive officer for Environmental Satellites; commander, MILSATCOM Systems Wing; and vice commander, Space and Missile Systems Center. Prior to her current assignment, she was director, space acquisition, Office of the Under Secretary of the Air Force, Washington, D.C.

In July 2014, Mashiko retired as Deputy Director of National Reconnaissance Office.

== Awards and decorations ==
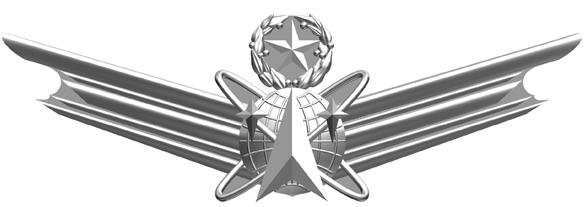

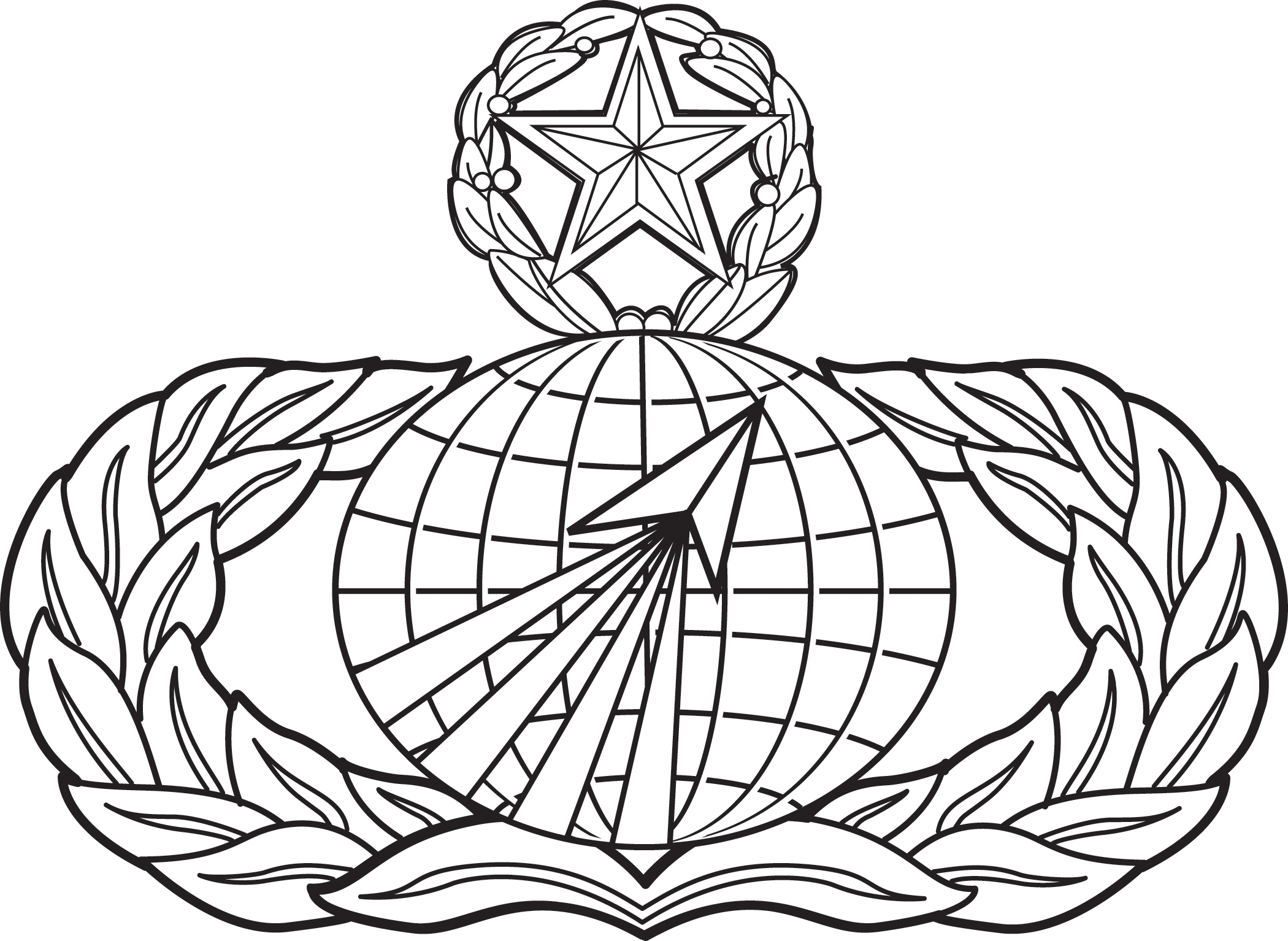

Badge	Master Space Operations Badge		
Badge	Master Acquisitions and Financial Management Badge		
1st row	Legion of Merit		Defense Meritorious Service Medal
2nd row	Meritorious Service Medal	Joint Service Commendation Medal	Air Force Commendation Medal
3rd row	Joint Service Achievement Medal	Air Force Achievement Medal	Joint Meritorious Unit Award
4th row	Air Force Outstanding Unit Award with two oak leaf clusters	Air and Space Recognition Ribbon	National Defense Service Medal with one service stars
5th row	Global War on Terrorism Service Medal	Air and Space Longevity Service Award with one silver oak leaf cluster and two oak leaf clusters	Air and Space Training Ribbon
Badge	Headquarters Air Force Badge		

- 1998 John J. Welch Award for Excellence in Acquisition Management, Secretary of the Air Force
- 1998 Strategic Acquisition Reform Award for Contracting Excellence, Secretary of the Air Force
- 1999 David W. Packard Award for Acquisition Excellence, Department of Defense
- 2003 Unit of the Year (Director), Air Force Association

This article contains information from the United States Federal Government and is in the public domain.

== Effective dates of promotion ==
Insignia	Rank	Date
	Major General	20 November 2009
	Brigadier General	7 September 2006
	Colonel	1 March 2001
	Lieutenant Colonel	1 November 1996
	Major	1 October 1981
	Captain	28 May 1984
	First Lieutenant	28 May 1982
	Second Lieutenant	28 May 1980

Military offices
Preceded by Ellen M. Pawlikowski	Commander of the Military Satellite Communications Systems Wing; 2007–2008	Succeeded by Samuel Greaves
Preceded by Ellen M. Pawlikowski	Vice Commander of the Space and Missile Systems Center; 2008–2009	Succeeded by Samuel Greaves
Preceded by ???	Director for Space Acquisition of the Office of the Under Secretary of the Air Force; 2009–2010	Succeeded by John E. Hyten
Preceded by Ellen M. Pawlikowski	Deputy Director of the National Reconnaissance Office; 2010–2013	Succeeded by Anthony J. Cotton
