= USA-169 =

USAF Communications satellite

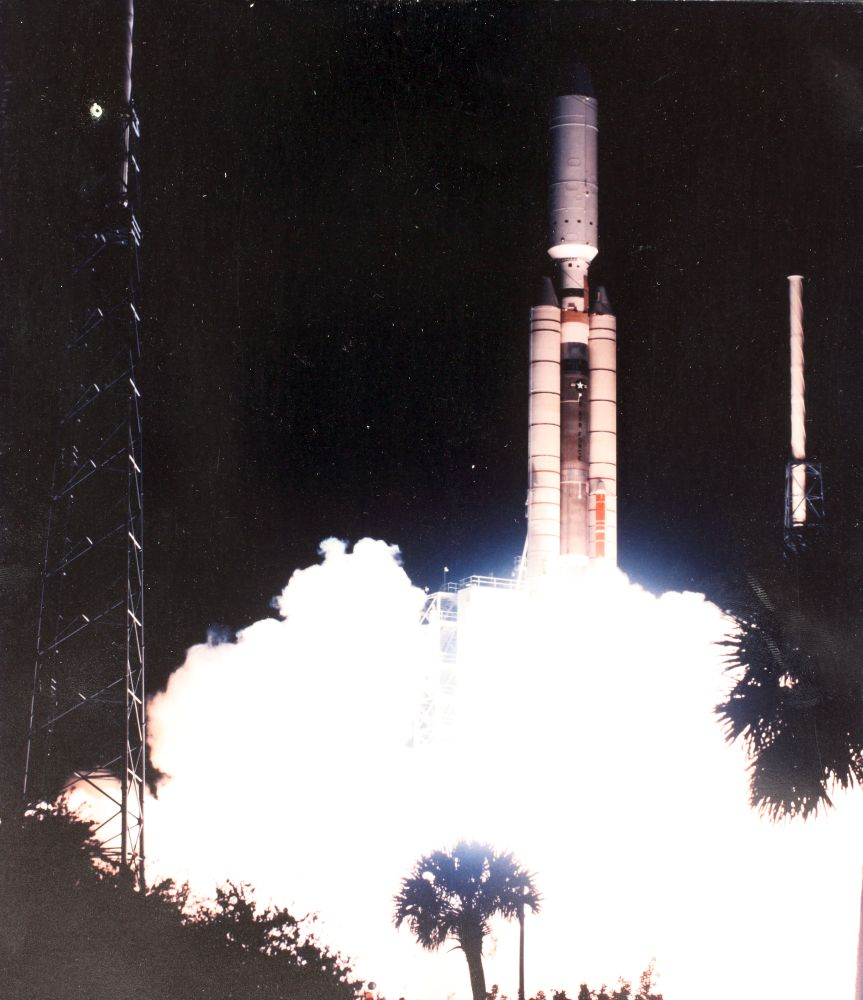
- Launch of USA-169
- Mission type: Communications
- Operator: United States Air Force
- COSPAR ID: 2003-012A
- SATCAT no.: 27711
- Mission duration: 10 Years

Spacecraft properties
- Spacecraft type: Milstar
- Manufacturer: Lockheed Martin
- Launch mass: 4500 Kg

Start of mission
- Launch date: 8 April 2003 13:43 UTC
- Rocket: Titan IV (401)B/Centaur-T (B-35/TC-23)
- Launch site: Cape Canaveral, SLC-40
- Contractor: Lockheed Martin

Orbital parameters
- Reference system: Geocentric orbit
- Regime: Geosynchronous orbit

USA-169 (also known as Milstar-2 4) is an American Communications satellite which was operated by the United States Air Force. Launched in April 2003, it is the last Milstar-2 communications satellite.

== Overview ==
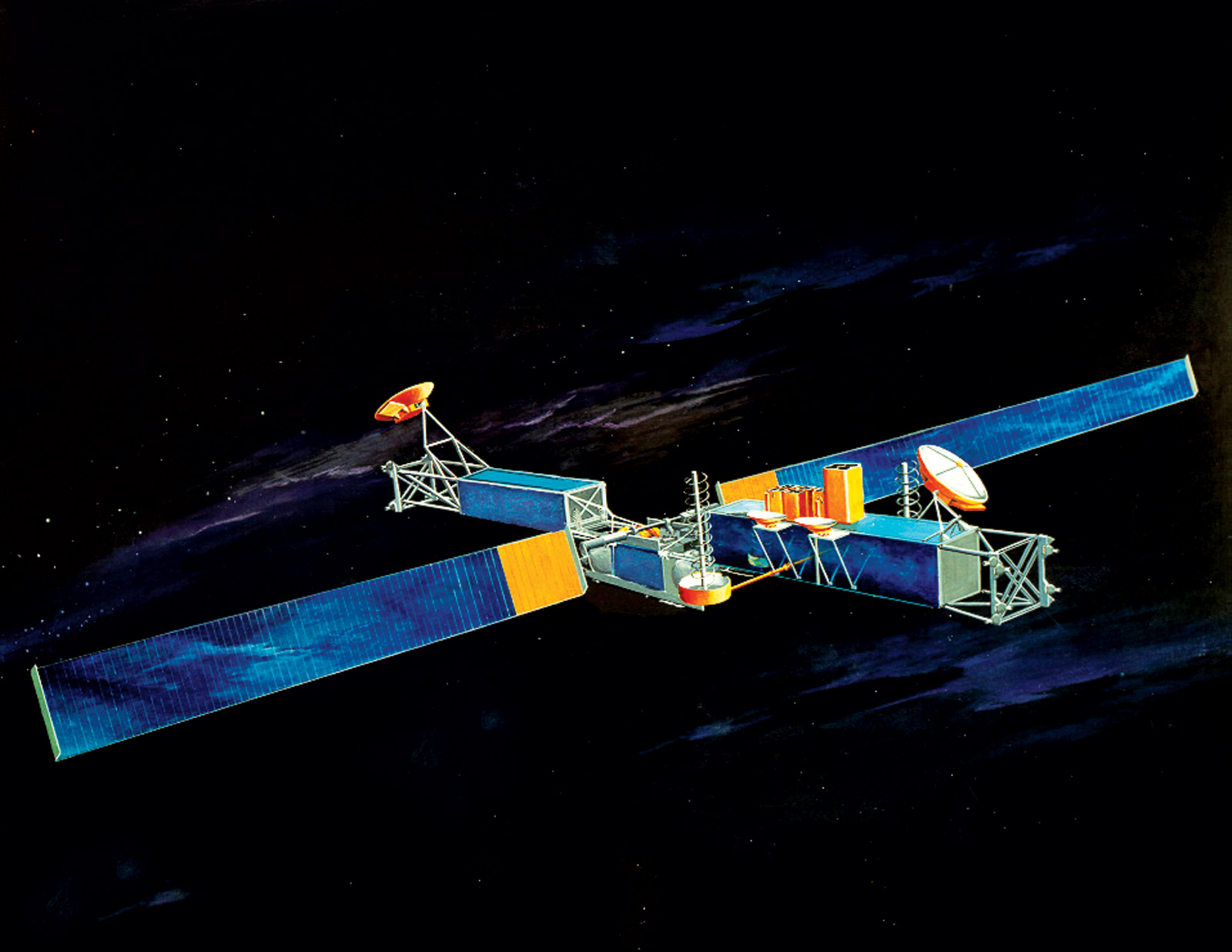
Artist's impression of a Milstar spacecraft

Milstar-2 is a Communications satellite which provided tactical communication services to US Armed Force replaced the Milstar-1 satellite and Advanced Extremely High Frequency (AEHF) is the Successor of Milstar-2 Satellites.

== See also ==
- List of USA satellites
