= Forrest S. McCartney =

United States Air Force general

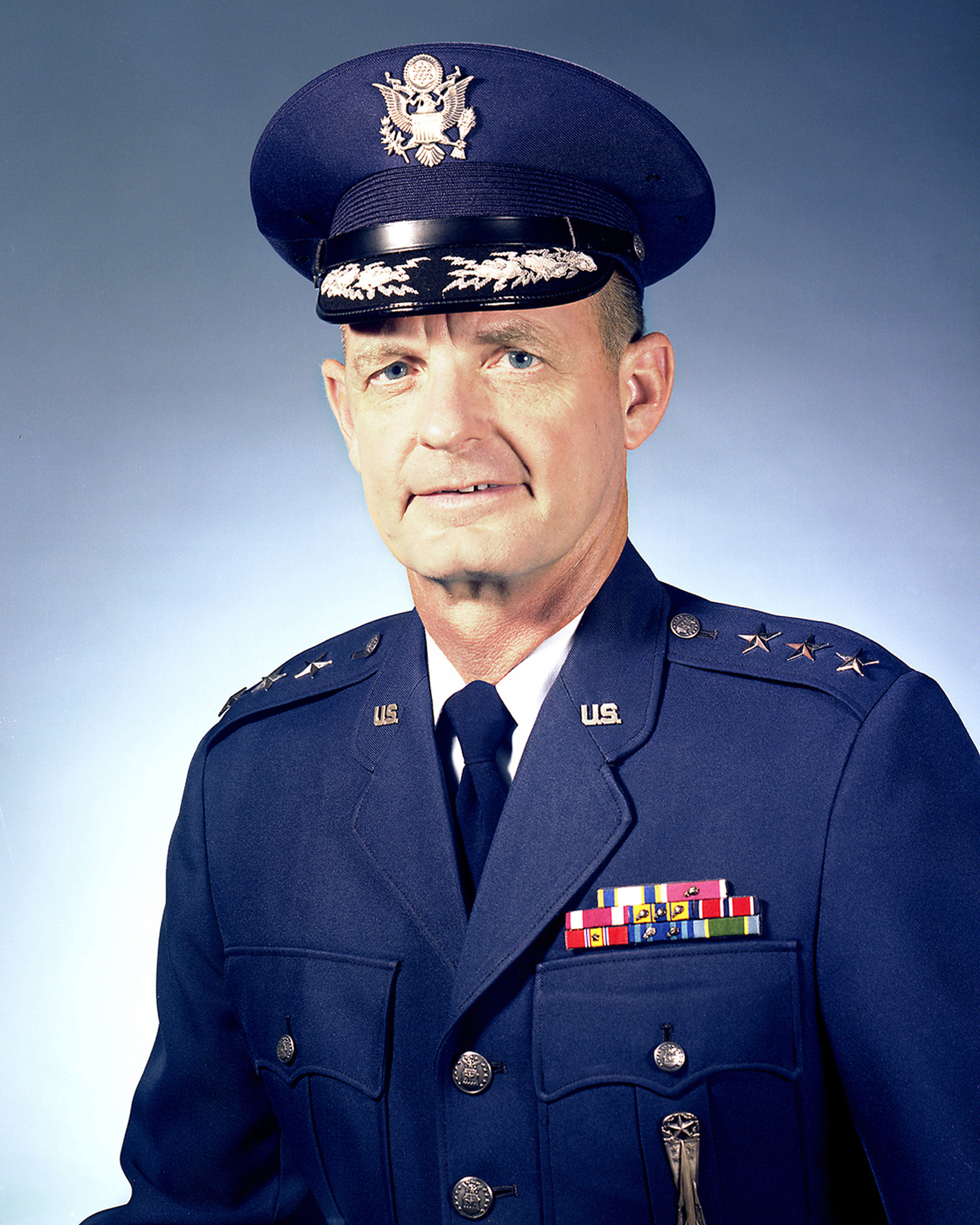
- Lt. General Forrest McCartney, USAF; USAF Official Photo
- Born: March 23, 1931; Fort Payne, Alabama, U.S.
- Died: July 17, 2012 (aged 81); Palm Bay, Florida, U.S.
- Military career
- Allegiance: United States
- Branch: United States Air Force
- Service years: 1952–1986
- Rank: Lieutenant General
- Awards: Air Force Distinguished Service Medal; Legion of Merit; Meritorious Service Medal; Air Force Commendation Medal; National Defense Service Medal
- Other work: Director of the Kennedy Space Center

Forrest Striplin McCartney (March 23, 1931 – July 17, 2012) was a United States Air Force lieutenant general and former director of NASA's John F. Kennedy Space Center.

McCartney was born in Fort Payne, Alabama. He graduated from Gulf Coast Military Academy in 1949, received a Bachelor of Science degree, in electrical engineering, from Alabama Polytechnic Institute, Auburn in 1952. He earned a master's degree, in nuclear engineering, from the Air Force Institute of Technology in 1955, and also graduated from the Armed Forces Staff College.

McCartney received his commission through the Reserve Officer Training Corps, and entered the regular air force in 1952. In May 1959, he was assigned to the Satellite Control Facility in Sunnyvale, California and worked on the CORONA program deploying and operating the nation's first spy satellites for the National Reconnaissance Office.

McCartney was promoted to the rank of lieutenant general on May 1, 1983, which is the rank at which he eventually retired. In 1986 he was selected, by NASA Administrator James C. Fletcher, to be the fourth director of the Kennedy Space Center. McCartney held this position from August 31, 1986, until December 31, 1991.

McCartney died in Palm Bay, Florida, on July 17, 2012, after a short illness.
