= Eugene L. Tattini =

United States Air Force general

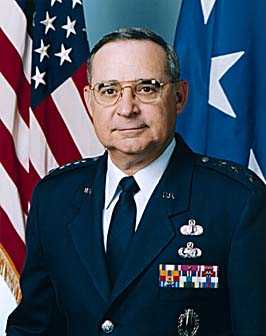
- Born: April 5, 1943 (age 83); Madison, Wisconsin
- Military career
- Allegiance: United States of America
- Branch: United States Air Force
- Rank: Lieutenant General

Eugene L. Tattini (born April 5, 1943) is a retired lieutenant general in the United States Air Force and served as deputy director of the Jet Propulsion Laboratory from July 2001 to September 2013.

== Biography ==
Tattini was born in Madison, Wisconsin. He attended the University of Illinois at Urbana-Champaign, Oklahoma City University, Cornell University, and Harvard University.

== Military career ==
Tattini joined the Air Force in 1965. Later in his career, he was named Director of Plans of Air Force Materiel Command. In 1998, he was given command of the Space and Missile Systems Center. His retirement was effective as of July 1, 2001.

Awards he has received include the Air Force Distinguished Service Medal, the Legion of Merit with oak leaf cluster, the Meritorious Service Medal with three oak leaf clusters, the Air Force Commendation Medal, and the Humanitarian Service Medal.
