= John F. Thompson (general) =

US Air Force general

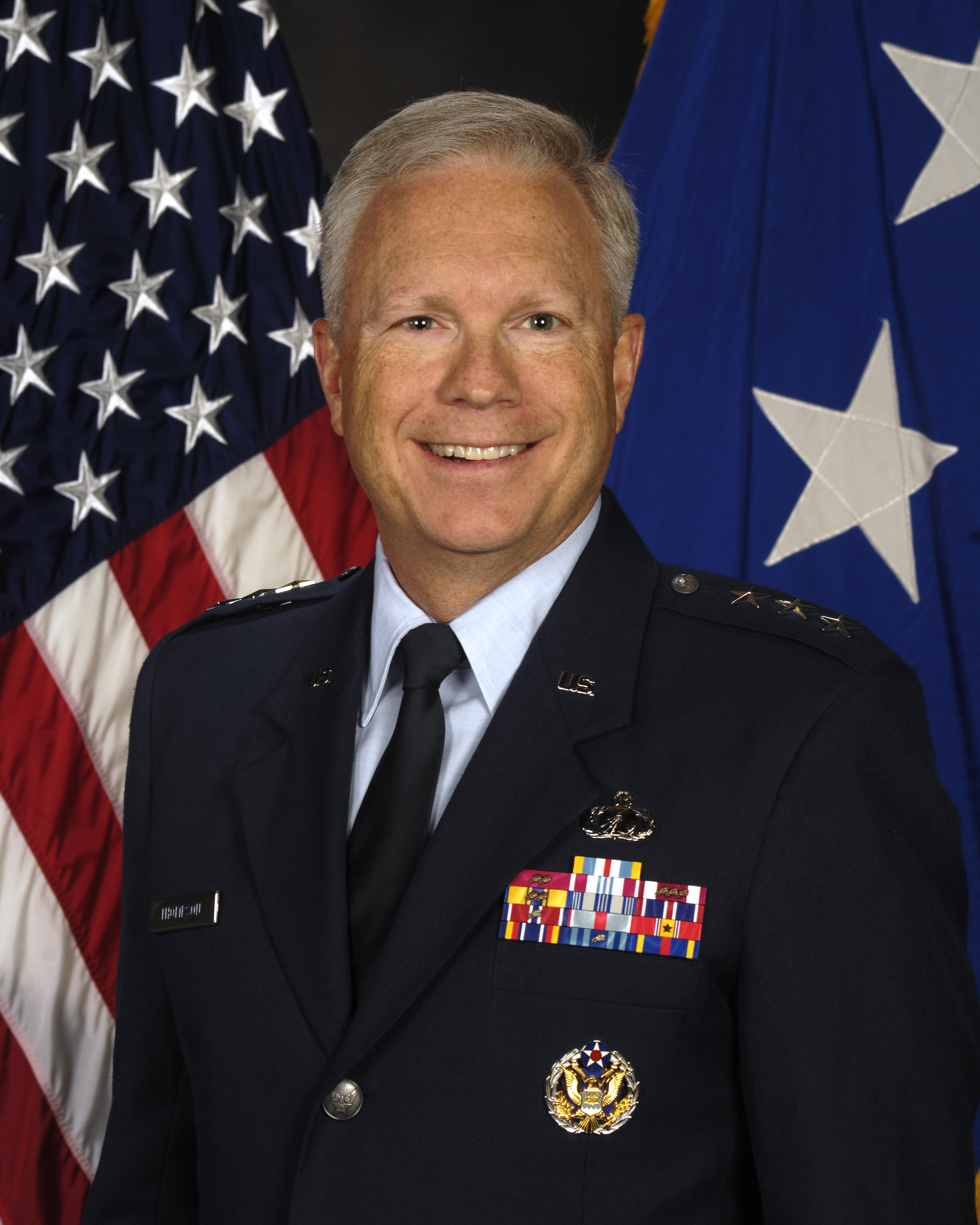
- Official portrait, 2014
- Born: Clearwater, Florida, US
- Military career
- Allegiance: United States
- Branch: United States Air Force
- Service years: 1984–2021
- Rank: Lieutenant General
- Nickname: JT
- Commands: Space and Missile Systems Center; Air Force Life Cycle Management Center; 303rd Aeronautical Systems Wing; 327th Aircraft Sustainment Wing
- Awards: Air Force Distinguished Service Medal (2); Defense Superior Service Medal; Legion of Merit (3)

John Ferdinand "JT" Thompson is a retired lieutenant general in the United States Air Force who last served as the commander of the Space and Missile Systems Center from May 2017 to July 2021. He entered the United States Air Force in 1984 as a graduate of the United States Air Force Academy.

Prior to assuming his current position, Thompson was commander of the Air Force Life Cycle Management Center, Wright-Patterson Air Force Base, Ohio. He has served in a variety of scientific, acquisition and logistics-oriented capacities, including staff assignments at Air Force Systems Command, Air Force Materiel Command, and in the office of the Assistant Secretary of the Air Force for Acquisition.

With the transition of the Space and Missile Systems Center to the new Space Systems Command and announcement of its new commander, Thompson held his retirement ceremony on July 27, 2021, with an official retirement date of August 1, 2021. He is the longest serving three-star commander of the Space and Missile Systems Center, serving for over 4 years in the post.

Thompson now serves as a member of the board of directors of the Utah State University's Space Dynamics Laboratory.

== Education ==
1984 Bachelor of Science, US Air Force Academy, Colorado Springs, Colo.
1988 Master of Science, Industrial Engineering, St. Mary's University, San Antonio, Texas
1989 Squadron Officer School, Maxwell Air Force Base, Ala.
1995 Air Command and Staff College, Maxwell AFB, Ala.
1996 Advanced Program Management Course, Defense Systems Management College, Fort Belvoir, Va.
2001 Air War College, Maxwell AFB, Ala.
2006 National Security Management Course, Syracuse University, NY

== Assignments ==
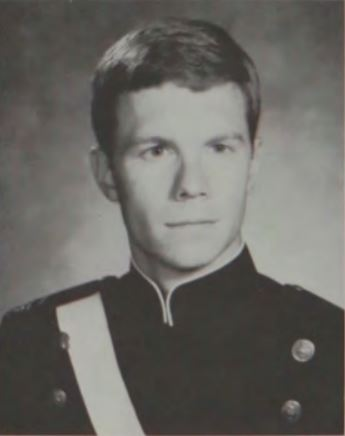
Thompson as a cadet at USAFA

1. January 1985–August 1987, Occupational Analyst, Air Force Occupational Measurement Center, Randolph Air Force Base, Texas
2. August 1987–August 1988, Student, Air Force Institute of Technology, St. Mary's University, San Antonio, Texas
3. August 1988–August 1989, Manager, International Cooperative Research and Development, Deputy Chief of Staff for Technology, Headquarters Air Force Systems Command, Andrews AFB, Md.
4. August 1989–December 1990, Special Assistant, Deputy Chief of Staff for Technology, Headquarters Air Force Systems Command, Andrews AFB, Md.
5. December 1990–July 1991, Action Officer, Commander's Staff Group, Headquarters Air Force Systems Command, Andrews AFB, Md.
6. July 1991–July 1992, Action Officer, Command Integration, Headquarters Air Force Materiel Command (Provisional), Wright-Patterson AFB, Ohio
7. July 1992–August 1994, Chief, Tri-Service Standoff Attack Missile Subsystems Development, TSSAM System Program Office, Aeronautical Systems Center, Wright-Patterson AFB, Ohio
8. August 1994–June 1995, Student, Air Command and Staff College, Maxwell AFB, Ala.
9. June 1995–August 1996, Chief, Acquisition Management and Policy Branch, Program Integration Division, Directorate of Global Power Programs, Assistant Secretary of the Air Force (Acquisition), Washington, D.C.
10. August 1996–November 1996, Student, Advanced Program Management Course, Defense Systems Management College, Fort Belvoir, Va.
11. November 1996–January 1998, Lead Joint Strike Fighter Program Element Monitor, Air Superiority Division, Directorate of Global Power Programs, Assistant Secretary of the Air Force (Acquisition), Washington, D.C.
12. January 1998–January 1999, Executive Officer, Directorate of Global Power Programs, Assistant Secretary of the Air Force (Acquisition), Washington, D.C.
13. January 1999–January 2000, Deputy Chief, Industrial Operations Division, Commodities Directorate, Ogden Air Logistics Center, Hill AFB, Utah
14. January 2000–July 2000, Chief, Commodities Division, Commodities Directorate, Ogden ALC, Hill AFB, Utah
15. July 2000–July 2001, Student, Air War College, Maxwell AFB, Ala.
16. July 2001–May 2003, Chief, Air Vehicle Division, C-17 System Program Office, Aeronautical Systems Center, Wright-Patterson AFB, Ohio
17. June 2003–February 2005, Director of Propulsion, Oklahoma City Air Logistics Center, Tinker AFB, Okla.
18. February 2005–August 2006, Commander, 327th Aircraft Sustainment Wing, Oklahoma City ALC, Tinker AFB, Okla.
19. August 2006–November 2006, Deputy Director, Strategic Plans and Programs (A8), Headquarters Air Force Materiel Command, Wright-Patterson AFB, Ohio
20. November 2006–March 2009, Chief of staff, Headquarters AFMC, Wright-Patterson AFB, Ohio
21. March 2009–March 2010, Commander, 303rd Aeronautical Systems Wing, and Air Force Program Executive Officer for Intelligence, Surveillance and Reconnaissance, Aeronautical Systems Center, AFMC, Wright-Patterson AFB, Ohio
22. March 2010–September 2011, Air Force Program Executive Officer for Strategic Systems, Kirtland AFB, N.M.
23. September 2011–July 2012, Deputy Program Executive Officer for the F-35 Joint Strike Fighter Program, Arlington, Va.
24. July 2012–January 2013, Tanker Program Executive Officer and KC-46 Program Director, Tanker Directorate, Air Force Life Cycle Management Center, Wright-Patterson AFB, Ohio
25. January 2013–September 2014, Air Force Program Executive Officer for Tankers, Tanker Directorate, AFLCMC, Wright-Patterson AFB, Ohio
26. October 2014–May 2017, Commander, AFLCMC, Wright-Patterson AFB, Ohio
27. May 2017–July 2021, Commander, Space and Missile Systems Center, Los Angeles AFB, Calif.

== Awards and decorations ==
Thompson is the recipient of the following awards:

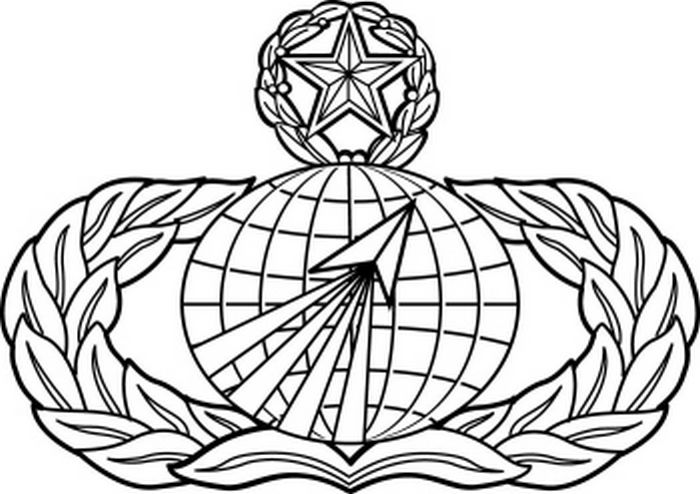

Air Force Master Acquisition and Financial Management Badge
Air Staff Badge

Defense Distinguished Service Medal with oak leaf cluster
Defense Superior Service Medal
Legion of Merit with two oak leaf clusters
Defense Meritorious Service Medal
Meritorious Service Medal with three oak leaf clusters
Air Force Commendation Medal with two oak leaf clusters
Air Force Achievement Medal
Air Force Outstanding Unit Award
Air Force Organizational Excellence Award with one silver oak leaf cluster
Air Force Recognition Ribbon
National Defense Service Medal with one bronze service star
Global War on Terrorism Service Medal
Air Force Longevity Service Award with one silver and three bronze oak leaf clusters
Air Force Training Ribbon

== Dates of promotion ==
Rank	Date
Second lieutenant	December 19, 1984
First lieutenant	December 19, 1986
Captain	December 19, 1988
Major	November 1, 1994
Lieutenant colonel	September 1, 1998
Colonel	August 1, 2002
Brigadier general	December 5, 2008
Major general	November 18, 2011
Lieutenant general	October 2, 2014

Military offices
Preceded by ???	Program Executive Officer for Tankers of the United States Air Force; 2013–2014	Succeeded by Duke Richardson
Preceded by C. D. Moore	Commander of the Air Force Life Cycle Management Center; 2014–2017	Succeeded by Robert McMurry
Preceded by Samuel A. Greaves	Commander of the Space and Missile Systems Center; 2017–2021	Succeeded by D. Jason Cothern; Acting
