= John T. Sheridan =

United States Air Force general

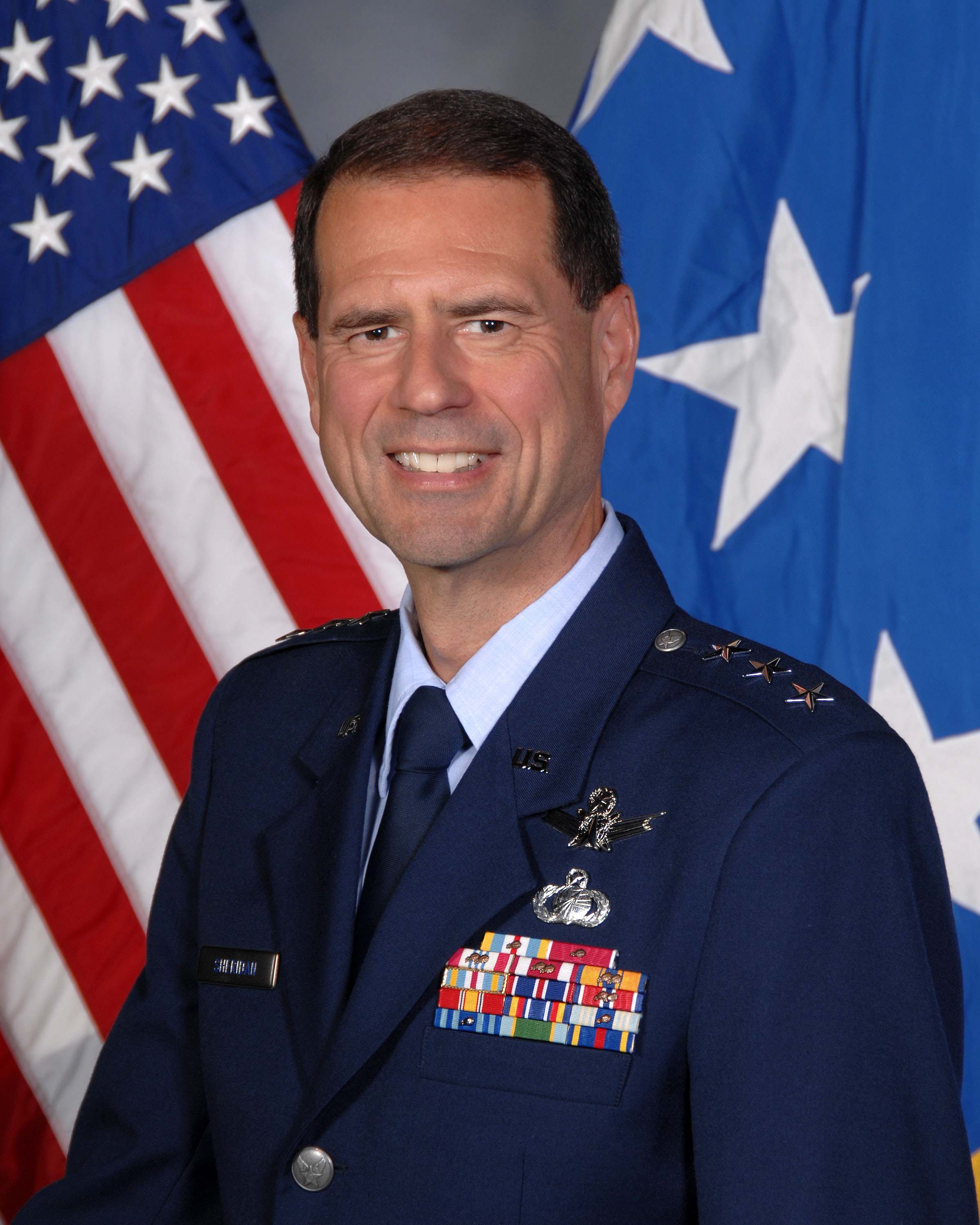

Commander, Space and Missiles Systems Center
- In office May 2008 – June 2011
- President: George W. Bush Barack Obama

First Deputy Director of the National Reconnaissance Office
- In office 31 July 2006 – 16 May 2008

Lieutenant General John T. "Tom" Sheridan retired from the US Air Force in August 2011 . His last assignment was as Commander, Space and Missile Systems Center, Los Angeles AFB, California; he was succeeded by Ellen M. Pawlikowski in June 2011. He has been VP of the SI's National Security Space program since 16 April 2012 ,.

His previous duties include being deputy director, National Reconnaissance Office, and Program Executive Officer and System Program Director for Space Radar, Chantilly, Virginia. As deputy director, he assists the Director and Principal Deputy Director in the day-to-day direction of the NRO, and also serves as the senior Air Force officer for Air Force civilian and uniformed personnel assigned to the organization. For Space Radar, he directs a program designed to satisfy both Department of Defense and Intelligence Community needs as part of a system of systems integrated approach toward persistent surveillance and reconnaissance capability for the nation.

General Sheridan graduated from the University of Connecticut in 1973 with a Bachelor of Science in mechanical engineering. He completed the university's Air Force ROTC program as a distinguished graduate. Following an educational delay to earn a Master of Business Administration degree from Bryant College in Rhode Island, he entered active duty in August 1975.

General Sheridan's experience includes acquisition leadership of aircraft, simulator and classified space programs; requirements development across all Air Force space programs; and operational leadership in four different national space programs. He has served as military assistant to the Assistant Secretary of the Air Force for Space, and as the Commandant of Air Command and Staff College, Maxwell Air Force Base, Alabama. Prior to assuming his position as commander of the space and missile systems center, the general was the Director of Requirements, Headquarters Air Force Space Command, Peterson AFB, Colorado.
