= Osmond J. Ritland =

United States Air Force major general (1909-1991)

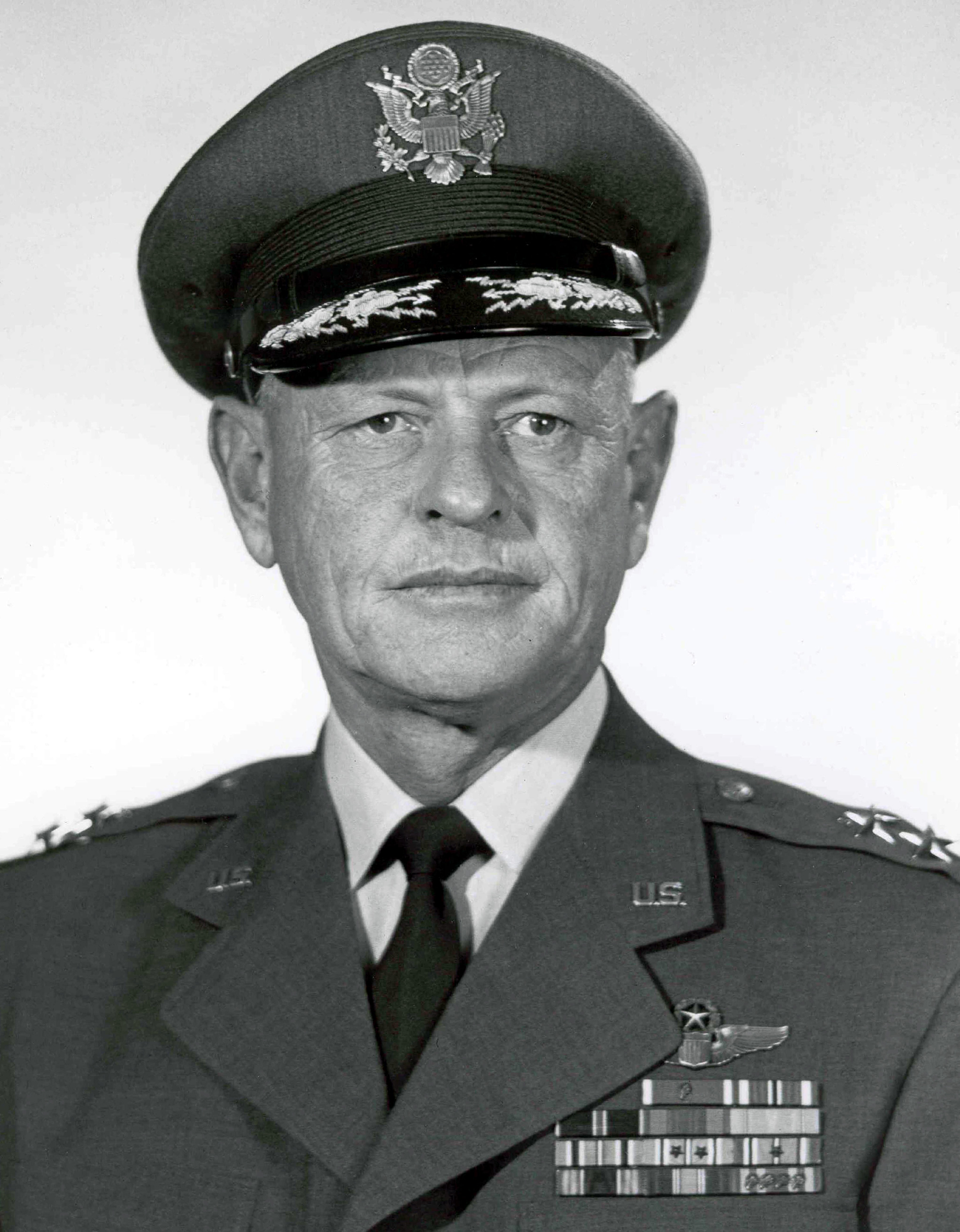
- Born: 30 October 1909; Berthoud, Colorado, U.S.
- Died: 23 March 1991 (aged 81); Encinitas, California, U. S.
- Burial place: Fort Rosecrans National Cemetery, San Diego, California, U.S.
- Military career
- Allegiance: United States
- Branch: United States Army (1932–1935, 1939–1947); United States Air Force (1947–1965)
- Service years: 1932–1935, 1939–1965
- Rank: Major general
- Service number: O22332
- Commands: 4925th Test Group; Air Force Ballistic Missile Division; Space Systems Division
- Conflicts: World War II; China-Burma-India Theater
- Awards: Legion of Merit (2); Air Force Distinguished Service Medal; Distinguished Flying Cross

Osmond Jay Ritland (30 October 1909 – 23 March 1991) was a United States Air Force (USAF) major general who played an important role in the development of the American ballistic missiles.

Ritland attended San Diego State College for three years before joining the United States Army Air Corps in 1932. He left in 1935 to become a pilot for United Airlines, but returned when he received a regular commission in 1939. During World War II he served as a test pilot at Wright Field and was involved in the development and testing of many of the aircraft used by the United States during and immediately after the war, and he was one of the first pilots to fly jet aircraft. In the latter part of the war he served in the China Burma India Theater as commander of the Assam Air Depot.

After the war he returned to Wright Field, where he was involved in the development of the ejection seat. In 1950 he organized and commanded the 4925th Test Group (Atomic), which handled the development and testing of equipment related to USAF nuclear weapons. His unit assisted the United States Atomic Energy Commission and the Armed Forces Special Weapons Project in evaluating the effects of nuclear tests. In 1955 and 1956 he was the deputy manager of the project that developed the Lockheed U-2 spy plane with the Central Intelligence Agency. He then became the manager of the USAF WS-117L project, the USAF component of the space program, and the deputy manager of the CORONA spy satellite project, another joint venture with the CIA. He was the first recipient of the Air Force Distinguished Service Medal in 1962, and his work in support of NASA's Project Mercury and Project Gemini was recognized with the award of its NASA Exceptional Service Medal in 1965.

== Early life ==
Osmond Jay Ritland was born in Berthoud, Colorado, on 30 October 1909. He attended San Diego State College for three years before joining the United States Army Air Corps as a flying cadet at Randolph Field, Texas, in 1932. He earned his wings at March Field, in May 1939, and was commissioned as a second lieutenant. He served as a fighter pilot and flew airmail until 1935, when he left active service to become a pilot for United Airlines.

== World War II ==
Ritland received a regular commission and returned to active duty with the Army Air Corps in 1939. He was initially assigned to Hamilton Field, California, but later that year, he was transferred to Wright Field, Ohio, for a five-year tour of duty as a test pilot. In this role he was involved in the development and testing of many of the aircraft used by the United States during World War II and in the immediate post-war era, including the Lockheed P-38 Lightning, Bell P-39 Airacobra, Curtiss P-40 Warhawk, Republic P-47 Thunderbolt and North American P-51 Mustang fighters, the Boeing B-17 Flying Fortress, Douglas XB-19, Martin B-26 Marauder, Boeing B-29 Superfortress and Consolidated B-32 Dominator bombers, and the Curtiss C-46 Commando and Douglas C-54 Skymaster transport aircraft. He also tested prototypes of the Bell P-59 Airacomet and Lockheed P-80 Shooting Star, becoming one of the first pilots to fly jet aircraft.

In March 1943 he had to bail out of a de Havilland Mosquito moments before it broke up in mid air. Some of the lines of his parachute were severed, resulting in too rapid a rate of descent. He broke his back on landing and he spent the next few months in a plaster cast. For his services as a test pilot, he was awarded the Distinguished Flying Cross.

In December 1944, Ritland was sent to the China Burma India Theater (CBI), where he commanded the Assam Air Depot until February 1946. For his services in CBI establishing and maintaining the supply system in support of air and ground operations, he was awarded the Bronze Star Medal and the Air Medal.

== Post-war ==
Ritland attended the Command and General Staff School at Fort Leavenworth, Kansas, and then returned to Wright Field as the chief of the Aircraft Laboratory. During this, his second tour of duty at Wright, he was involved in the development of the ejection seat. His next assignment was to Kirtland Air Force Base in New Mexico in February 1950, where organized and commanded the 4925th Test Group (Atomic), which handled the development and testing of equipment related to the United States Air Force's nuclear weapons. His unit assisted the United States Atomic Energy Commission and the Armed Forces Special Weapons Project in evaluating the effects of nuclear tests, and developed techniques for sampling fallout. He had operational control of all aircraft at the Nevada Test Site. His services were recognized with the award of the Legion of Merit.

Ritland attended the Industrial College of the Armed Forces. From July 1954 to December 1954 he was chief of the Atomic Energy Division at USAF Headquarters. In this role he was responsible for USAF's nuclear weapons. He then became the special assistant to the Deputy Chief of Staff of the Air Force for Development. In this role he was the USAF's project manager for the Lockheed U-2 spy plane. He became the deputy head of the project, codename Oilstone, to Richard M. Bissell Jr. from the Central Intelligence Agency (CIA) on 27 June 1955, although this did not become official until a formal agreement between the CIA and the USAF was signed on 4 August. On 12 April 1955, Bissell, Ritland, Kelly Johnson and Tony LeVier reconnoitered an old airstrip near Groom Lake on the Nevada Test Site, and selected it as a base for the U-2 project. It became known as Area 51. Ritland was on hand to witness the first official flight of the U-2 on 8 August 1955. He returned to the USAF in March 1956. For this service, he was awarded an oak leaf cluster to his Legion of Merit.

In April 1956, Ritland became the vice commander of the Air Force Ballistic Missile Division (AFBMD) and was promoted to brigadier general in October of that year. He was responsible for the day-to-day management of the WS-117L project, which was the USAF space program. Once again he was deputy to Bissell, this time working on a spy satellite, which became CORONA. Ritland chose to employ the Thor rocket, as it was further along in development than the Atlas or Titan rockets that the AFBMD also had under development at the time. Thor lacked the power to reach the required orbit, so it was coupled with an Agena upper stage. A Thor-Agena rocket was successfully launched on 28 February 1959.

Ritland became the commander of the AFBMD on 25 April 1959 and was promoted to major general in July 1959. In a major reorganization on 1 April 1961, the Air Research and Development Command was merged with the Air Materiel Command to form the Air Force Systems Command (AFSC), and Ritland became the commander of its Space Systems Division. On 15 May 1962, he became deputy commander of the AFSC for Manned Space Flight. For his service as commander of the AFBMD and the Space Systems Division, Ritland became the first recipient of the Air Force Distinguished Service Medal in August 1962. His work on spaceflight in support of Project Mercury and Project Gemini was recognized by NASA with the award of its NASA Exceptional Service Medal in November 1965. He retired from the USAF on 1 December 1965.

== Later life ==
For the next five years, Ritland was Vice President for Launch at McDonnell Douglas. He then retired to live in El Rancho, California. He died at a hospital in Encinitas, California, on 23 March 1991, and was buried at Fort Rosecrans National Cemetery in San Diego, California. He was survived by his wife Martha and two daughters.
