= Richard C. Henry =

Lieutenant general in the United States Air Force

Richard Charles Henry
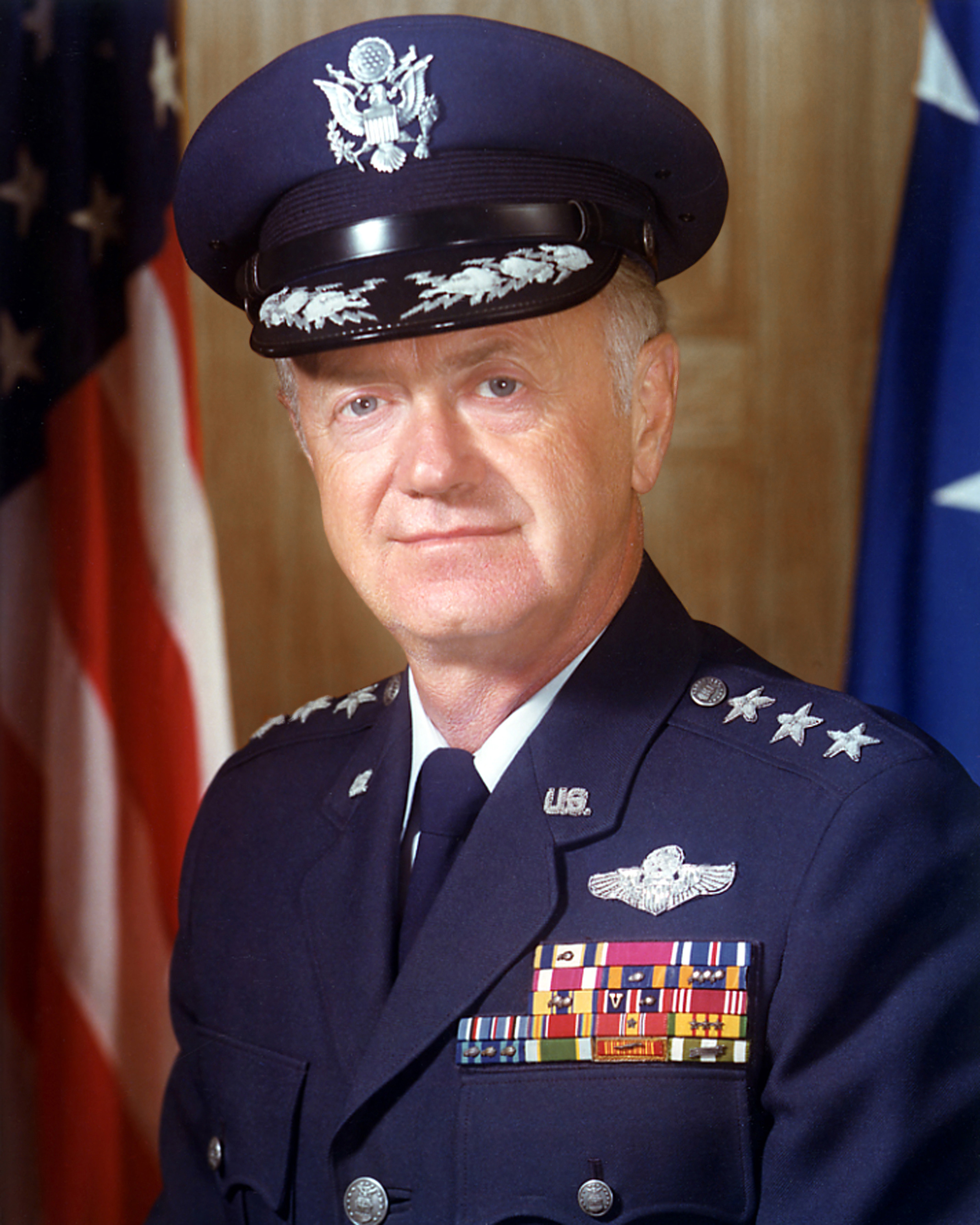
- Born: December 17, 1925; Streator, Illinois, U.S.
- Died: July 5, 2020 (aged 94); Williamsburg, Virginia, U.S.
- Alma mater: University of Michigan
- Military career
- Allegiance: United States of America
- Branch: United States Air Force
- Service years: 1949–1983
- Rank: Lieutenant General
- Awards: Order of the Sword, Distinguished Service Medal with oak leaf cluster, Legion of Merit, Distinguished Flying Cross, Meritorious Service Medal, Air Medal with nine oak leaf clusters, Air Force Commendation Medal with two oak leaf clusters and Republic of Vietnam Gallantry Cross with palm, NASA Sustained Superior Performance Award and three Group Achievement Awards.

Richard Charles Henry (December 17, 1925 – July 5, 2020) was a lieutenant general in the United States Air Force who served as commander of the Space Division, Air Force Systems Command, Los Angeles Air Force Station, Calif. He also served as vice commander of Space Command and as the Department of Defense manager for the National Space Transportation System.

Henry was born in 1925, in Streator, Illinois. He enlisted in the U.S. Army in February 1944 and served in the infantry until his appointment as a cadet to the U.S. Military Academy, West Point, N.Y., in 1945. He graduated from the academy in 1949 with a commission as a second lieutenant and a bachelor of science degree in military engineering. He received master of science degrees in aeronautical engineering and instrumentation engineering from the University of Michigan at Ann Arbor in 1954 and graduated from the National War College, Fort Lesley J. McNair, Washington, D.C., in 1967.

After completing pilot training in August 1950 at Vance Air Force Base, Oklahoma, Henry was assigned to the 43rd Bombardment Wing, Strategic Air Command, Davis-Monthan Air Force Base, Arizona, as a B-50 combat crewmember. He entered the University of Michigan graduate school under the Air Force Institute of Technology program in June 1952.

Following graduation he returned to SAC in June 1954 with duty at Holloman Air Force Base, New Mexico, and later at the Air Force Ballistic Missile Division, Inglewood, Calif. In January 1959 he was assigned to Headquarters 7th Air Division, High Wycombe Air Station, England, as a staff officer for the Thor intermediate-range ballistic missile deployment.

Henry was assigned to Headquarters U.S. Air Force, Washington, D.C., in March 1960 as a requirements officer in the Directorate of Operational Requirements, working with the military space programs. In February 1962 Henry joined the Office of Manned Space Flight, National Aeronautics and Space Administration, and was named chief, Apollo Navigation/Guidance and Lunar Module Development programs. From December 1963 to July 1964, he served as director of Gemini program control. He then transferred to the Manned Spacecraft Center, Houston, as manager of the Gemini program until August 1966.

After graduation from the National War College in June 1967, he was assigned to the 479th Tactical Fighter Wing, George Air Force Base, Calif., as assistant director of operations. In February 1968 he became director of operations. In March 1969 Henry transferred to the Republic of Vietnam as vice commander of the 37th Tactical Fighter Wing at Phu Cat Air Base. He joined the 33rd Tactical Fighter Wing at Eglin Air Force Base, Fla., in April 1970 as vice commander and in October 1970 took command of the wing.

He moved to Headquarters Tactical Air Command, Langley Air Force Base, Virginia, in March 1972 as inspector general. He became the command's deputy chief of staff for requirements in November 1973.

In August 1974 he was named vice commander of the Space and Missile Systems Organization at Los Angeles Air Force Station. From September 1976 to April 1978, Henry was assigned to Air Force headquarters as director of development and acquisition, Office of the Deputy Chief of Staff, Research and Development. He was named commander of the Space and Missile Systems Organization in May 1978 and in October 1979 the organization's name was changed to Space Division. He was responsible for all DoD space shuttle operations, space defense initiative (SDI) or Star Wars and supported President Reagan policy speeches on national space policy and operations.

A command pilot with more than 4,000 flying hours, including 207 combat missions in F-4s while in Southeast Asia, Henry also wore the Master Missile Badge. His military decorations and awards include the Distinguished Service Medal with oak leaf cluster, Legion of Merit, Distinguished Flying Cross, Meritorious Service Medal, Air Medal with nine oak leaf clusters, Air Force Commendation Medal with two oak leaf clusters and Republic of Vietnam Gallantry Cross with palm. While assigned to the National Aeronautics and Space Administration, he received the administration's Sustained Superior Performance Award and three Group Achievement Awards.

He was promoted to lieutenant general May 1, 1978, with same date of rank. He retired on May 1, 1983 and died on July 5, 2020.

He received the 1982 General Thomas D. White USAF Space Trophy for "Military use of payload specialists on shuttle; established Air Force Space Command."
