= Military Satellite Communications Directorate =

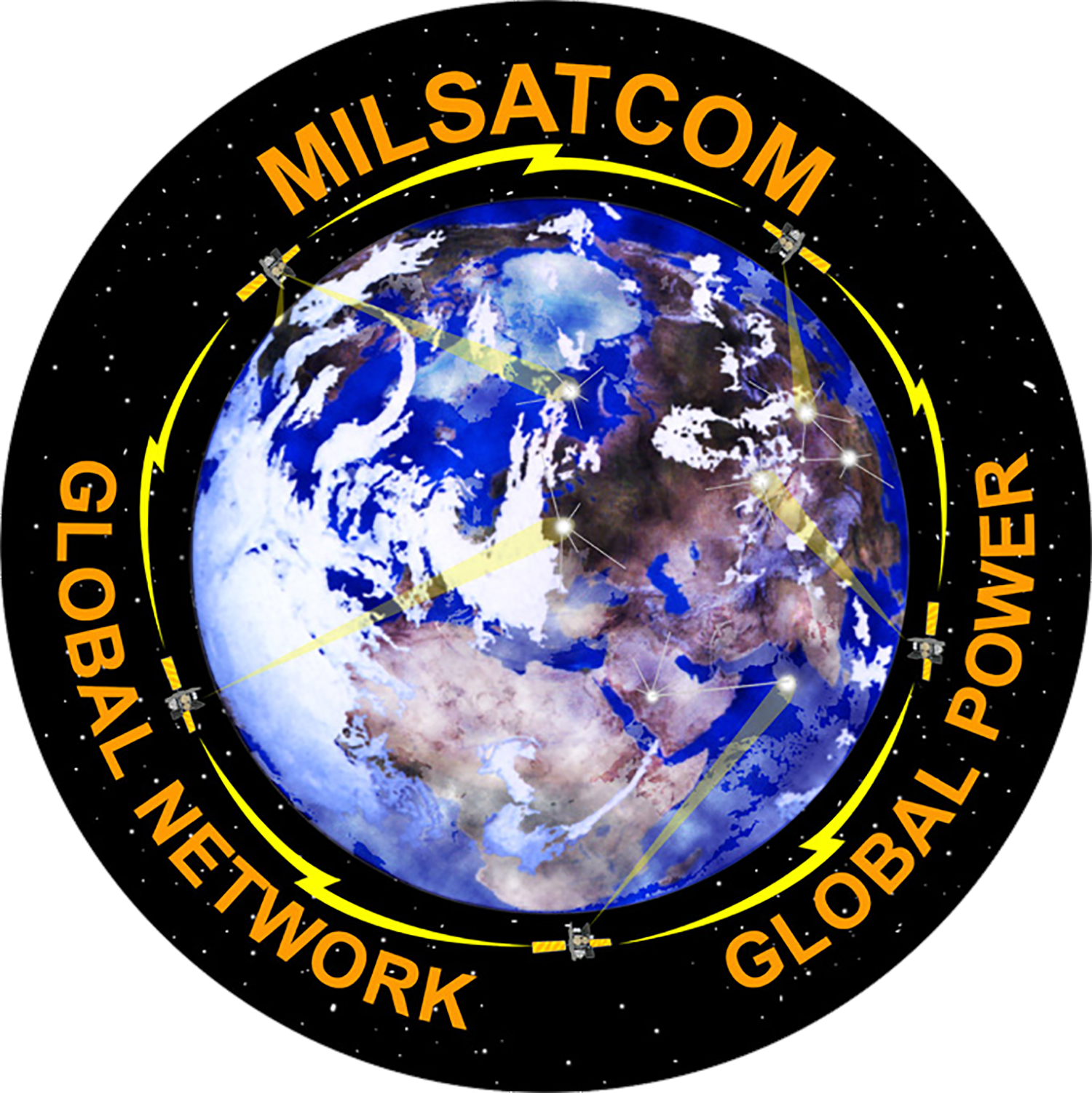
- Active: 19??–c.2023
- Country: United States
- Branch: United States Space Force
- Part of: Space and Missile Systems Center
- Garrison/HQ: Los Angeles Air Force Base, California

The Military Satellite Communications Directorate is a United States Space Force organization headquartered at Los Angeles Air Force Base, California. It is one of several wings and other units that make up the Space and Missile Systems Center (SMC).

== Mission ==
The MCSW develops, acquires, and sustains space-enabled, global communications capabilities to support national objectives.

== Organization ==
MCSW has five groups and one squadron which deliver three primary Satellite Communications (SATCOM) product lines:

The Protected Communications Group provides the United States Department of Defense (DoD) survivable, global, secure, protected, jam-resistant communications for high priority military ground, sea, and air assets. The group provides operations and sustainment support to the on-orbit Milstar Communications satellite constellation. In addition, the group executes the $6.7B Advanced Extremely High Frequency (AEHF) and $1.2B Enhanced Polar SATCOM (EPS) programs. The user equipment or terminals for the DoD protected communication systems in the currently operational Milstar Command Post Terminal (CPT) and $3.2B Family of Advanced Beyond-Line-of-Sight Terminals (FAB-T) development program.

The Wideband Communication Group provides worldwide, high-volume, voice and data communications to the warfighter. The group provides operations and sustainment support for the on-orbit Defense Satellite Communications System (DSCS) constellation. In addition the group executes the $1.9B Wideband Global SATCOM system (WGS) and $0.9B Global Broadcast Service (GBS). Wideband communication terminals include the Ground Multi-band Terminal (GMT), the High Data Rate - Radio Frequency (HDR-RF) ground terminal program which is an evolutionary upgrade to the GMT, and the FAB-T Increment 2.

The Transformational Satellite Communications System (TSAT) was the DoD's future MILSATCOM System. The $24.0B TSAT system was meant to provide real-time connectivity of all Global Information Grid (GIG) assets; provide Battle Command-On-The-Move capability for Small Mobile Units; worldwide persistent connectivity of high/low resolution Intelligence Surveillance and Reconnaissance; and survivable communications for Strategic Forces. The TSAT program office consisted of the TSAT Network Integration Group, the TSAT Space Group and the TSAT Mission Operations Group. Currently, this program appears to have been canceled.

Satellite command and control system development for all MILSATCOM systems is the responsibility of the MILSATCOM C2 Squadron. The squadron directs the Command and Control System-Consolidated (CCS-C) program, the command and control system of record for Milstar, DSCS, and WGS satellites currently on-orbit. Ultimately, CCS-C will control over 26 military communications satellites across four families, including DSCS; Milstar; WGS; and AEHF System, using state-of-the-art commercial telemetry, tracking and commanding (TT&C) technology.

== History ==
Previously known as the MILSATCOM Joint Program Office (MJPO), the Space & Missile Systems Center established the MILSATCOM Systems Wing on 1 August 2006. The team is made up of joint-service military, government civilians, The Aerospace Corporation, MITRE, MIT Lincoln Laboratory, Systems Engineering and Technical Assistance (SETA), National Security Agency (NSA), MCSW's industrial partners and the contract work force that support them.
