= Distinguished Service Medal (U.S. Air and Space Forces) =

United States Air and Space Forces medal

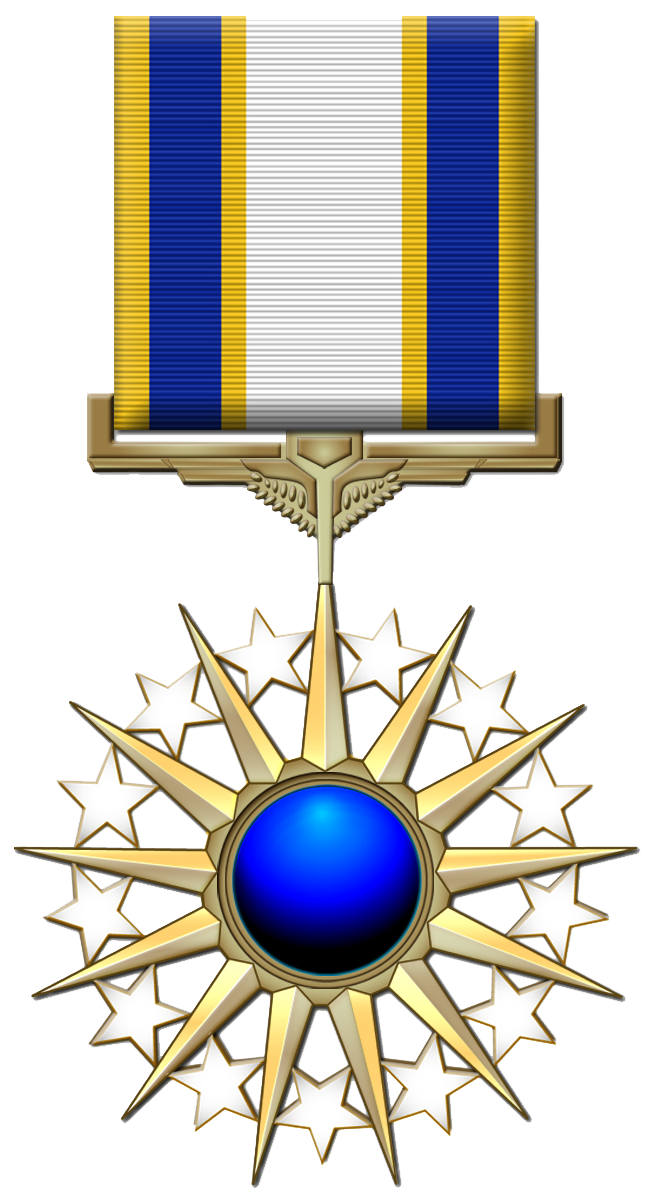
- Type: Military medal Distinguished service medal
- Awarded for: Exceptionally meritorious service in a duty of great responsibility
- Presented by: United States Department of the Air Force
- Eligibility: United States Air Force airmen and United States Space Force guardians
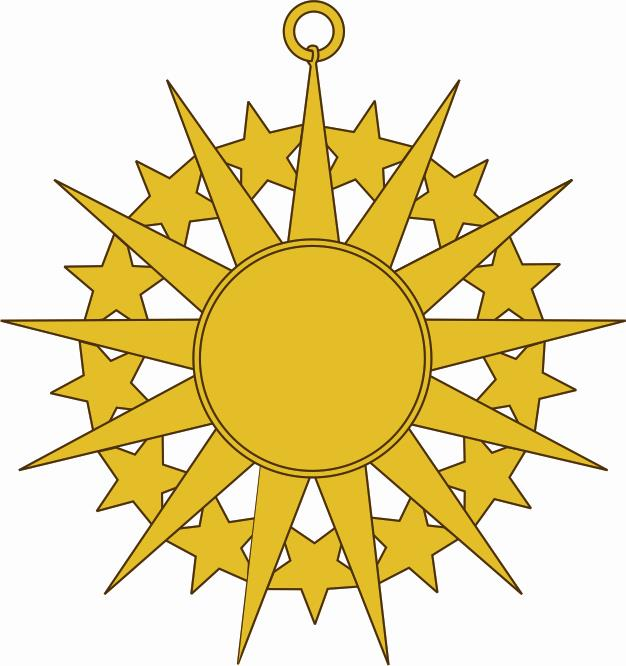
- Reverse
- Status: Currently awarded
- Established: 6 July 1960
- First award: 30 November 1965
- Service ribbon

Precedence
- Next (higher): Department of Defense: Defense Distinguished Service Medal; Department of Homeland Security: Homeland Security Distinguished Service Medal
- Equivalent: Army: Distinguished Service Medal; Naval Service: Navy Distinguished Service Medal; Coast Guard: Coast Guard Distinguished Service Medal
- Next (lower): Silver Star Medal

The Distinguished Service Medal (DSM) is a military decoration of the United States Air Force and United States Space Force and is presented to airmen and guardians to recognize distinguished and exceptionally meritorious service to the United States while serving in a duty or position of great responsibility. The Distinguished Service Medal was created by an act of the United States Congress on July 6, 1960 and was first awarded in 1965. Prior to the creation of the Distinguished Service Medal in 1960, United States Air Force airmen were awarded the Army Distinguished Service Medal.

The Distinguished Service Medal is equivalent to the Army's Distinguished Service Medal, Naval Service's Navy Distinguished Service Medal, and the Coast Guard Distinguished Service Medal.

The interpretation of the phrase "great responsibility" means that this medal is generally awarded only to officers who hold at least the rank of major general. However, as is customary for most military decorations, the requirements for the Distinguished Service Medal are interpreted more liberally when awarded upon retirement. As a result, it is the typical decoration for a retiring brigadier general, and in recent years it has also been awarded to the Chief Master Sergeant of the Air Force upon retirement. Cases of the award of this decoration to an individual who was not a general officer, or the Chief Master Sergeant of the Air Force, are unusual. Two notable exceptions are astronauts Colonel Buzz Aldrin and Colonel David Scott (who flew on Gemini 8, Apollo 9, and Apollo 15) who was awarded the medal twice.

Recipients during the medal's first 6 years included General Emmett E. "Rosie" O'Donnell Jr. (a United States Air Force four-star general who served as Commander in Chief, Pacific Air Forces from 1959 to 1963). O'Donnell also led the first B-29 Superfortress attack upon Tokyo during World War II after the 1942 Doolittle Raid. Another early recipient of the Distinguished Service Medal was Major General Osmond J. Ritland, USAF, who received his medal on November 30, 1965, upon his retirement.

Additional awards are denoted with oak leaf clusters.

This award is comparable to the Department of the Air Force Decoration for Exceptional Civilian Service given to civilian employees of the Department of the Air Force.

== Notable recipients ==
- General of the Army and General of the Air Force Henry H. Arnold
- General Creighton Abrams – US Army Chief of Staff
- General Philip M. Breedlove – NATO Supreme Allied Commander Europe
- General Benjamin O. Davis Jr. – First African-American general officer in the United States Air Force, Commander Of The Tuskegee Airmen
- General Ira C. Eaker – Eighth Air Force Commander
- General John W. Foss – Commander US Army Training and Doctrine Command
- General Andrew Goodpaster – NATO Supreme Allied Commander Europe
- General Lyman Lemnitzer – NATO Supreme Allied Commander Europe
- General David C. Jones – Chairman of the Joint Chiefs of Staff
- General Richard Myers – Chairman of the Joint Chiefs of Staff
- General Peter Pace – Chairman of the Joint Chiefs of Staff
- General Colin Powell – Chairman of the Joint Chiefs of Staff
- General Joseph Ralston – NATO Supreme Allied Commander Europe
- General Bernard W. Rogers – NATO Supreme Allied Commander Europe
- General John Dale Ryan - Chief of Staff of the United States Air Force
- General H. Norman Schwarzkopf – Commander US Central Command
- General Eric Shinseki – US Army Chief of Staff
- Admiral Jonathan Greenert – Chief of Naval Operations
- Admiral Carlisle Trost – Chief of Naval Operations
- Lieutenant General Brent Scowcroft – National Security Advisor
- Major General William Anders – Lunar Module Pilot for Apollo 8 and Chairman/CEO of General Dynamics
- Major General Michael Collins – Command Module Pilot for Apollo 11 and Director of the National Air and Space Museum
- Major General Susan Pamerleau (USAF) (Ret.) – United States Marshal for the Western District of Texas
- Brigadier General Jimmy Stewart – Actor and Air Force Reserve officer
- Brigadier General Bud Day – Medal of Honor – Air Force Cross – Silver Star
- Brigadier General Chuck Yeager – Test pilot
- Colonel Buzz Aldrin – Second man on the Moon
- Colonel Frank Borman – Astronaut and Chairman of Eastern Airlines
- Colonel David Scott – Seventh man on the Moon
- Colonel John A. Warden III – Architect of First Gulf War air campaign

== See also ==
- Awards and decorations of the United States Armed Forces
- Defense Distinguished Service Medal
- Distinguished Service Medal (U.S. Army)
- Navy Distinguished Service Medal
- Coast Guard Distinguished Service Medal
- Coast and Geodetic Survey Distinguished Service Medal
- Merchant Marine Distinguished Service Medal
