= Space Warfighting Analysis Center =

US Space Force analysis unit

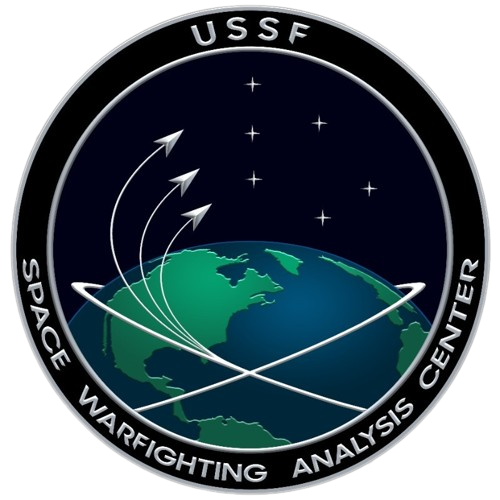
- Center emblem
- Founded: 5 April 2021; 4 years ago
- Country: United States
- Branch: United States Space Force
- Type: Direct reporting unit
- Headquarters: Washington, D.C.

Commanders
- Director: Andrew D. Cox
- Deputy Director: Col James E. Roberts

Insignia
- Center patch

The Space Warfighting Analysis Center (SWAC) is a direct reporting unit in the United States Space Force responsible for conducting analysis, modeling, wargaming, and experimentation to create operational concepts and force design guidance for the service. It is the Space Force's counterpart to the Air Force Warfighting Integration Capability and United States Army Futures Command. It is headquartered at Washington, D.C.

The establishment of SWAC was ordered by Chief of Space Operations John W. Raymond. Originally planned as Space Warfighting Integration Center, Vice Chief of Space Operations David D. Thompson was tasked to focus with its establishment upon taking office. Raymond approved the organizational design of SWAC on 8 March 2021. It was activated on 5 April 2021.

SWAC was criticized by the House Committee on Appropriations in a report as being duplicative of the Space Security and Defense Program (SSDP), refusing the $37 million budget request for the organization. It is expected to complete its first architecture study, which focuses on missile warning, missile tracking, and missile defense architecture.

== Force designs ==
- Missile Warning and Tracking
- Ground Moving Target Indicator (GMTI)
- Space Data Transport
- Position, Navigation, and Timing (PNT)
- Tactical ISR
- Space Domain Awareness (SDA)

== List of directors ==
No.	Director		Term		
No.	Portrait	Name	Took office	Left office	Term length
1	Andrew D. Cox	Andrew D. Cox	5 April 2021	Incumbent	4 years, 146 days

== See also ==
- United States Army Futures Command
- United States Space Force
