= Jack Weinstein (general) =

United States Air Force general

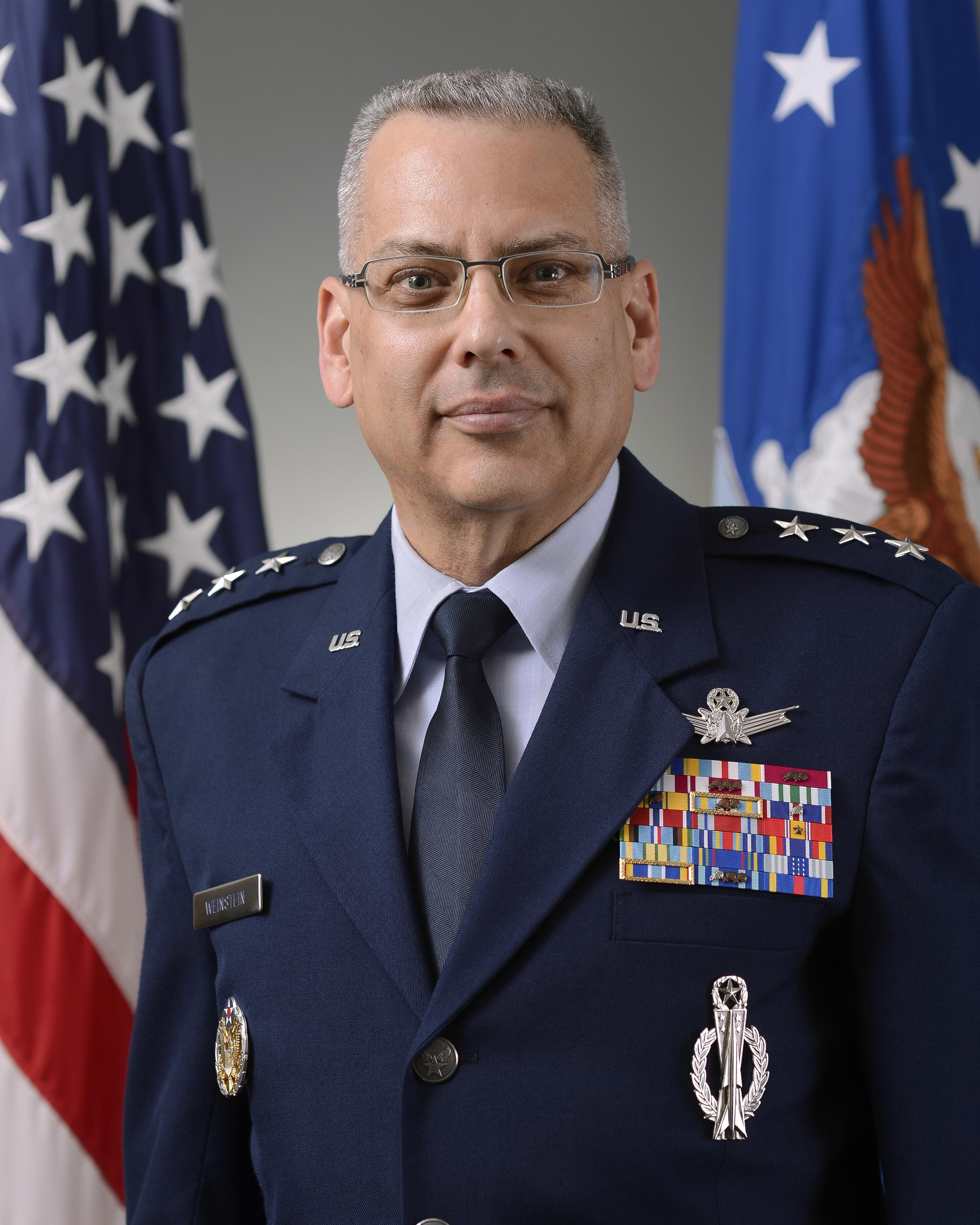
- Military career
- Allegiance: United States
- Branch: United States Air Force
- Service years: 1982–2018
- Rank: Lieutenant general
- Commands: Twentieth Air Force; 30th Space Wing; 90th Operations Group; 2nd Space Warning Squadron

Jack Weinstein is a retired lieutenant general in the United States Air Force. His final post was as the Deputy Chief of Staff for Strategic Deterrence and Nuclear Integration, Headquarters U. S. Air Force, Washington D.C. In this capacity, Weinstein was responsible to the Secretary and Chief of Staff of the Air Force for focus on Nuclear Deterrence Operations. Previously he was Commander, Twentieth Air Force, part of the Air Force Global Strike Command, and Commander, Task Force 214, part of the U.S. Strategic Command, at Francis E. Warren Air Force Base, in Wyoming.

== Career ==
Weinstein joined the Air Force in 1982. He then began training at Vandenberg Air Force Base. The following year, he was stationed at Grand Forks Air Force Base. He remained there until 1988, at which time he returned to Vandenberg Air Force Base and was assigned to the 1st Strategic Aerospace Division. In 1991, he became executive officer of the Twentieth Air Force at Vandenberg.

In 1992, Weinstein was assigned to Air Combat Command. The following year, he transferred to Air Force Space Command. From 1995 to 1997, he was an ICBM requirements officer and Deputy Chief of Staff of United States Strategic Command. He then joined the 12th Space Warning Squadron at Thule Air Base in Greenland. After returning for a time to United States Strategic Command, Weinstein assumed command of the 90th Operations Group at Francis E. Warren Air Force Base in 2003. In 2005, he returned again to Vandenberg Air Force Base, where he assumed command of the 30th Space Wing. Also during this time, Weinstein was deployed overseas to serve as Director of Space Forces in the War in Afghanistan (2001–present) and the Iraq War.

In 2007, he returned to Air Force Space Command as Director of Plans, Programs and Analyses.

In October 2013, Weinstein was selected by Lt. General James Kowalski, the commander of the Air Force Global Strike to replace Maj. Gen. Michael Carey as Commander, Twentieth Air Force, Air Force Global Strike Command, and Commander, Task Force 214, U.S. Strategic Command.

On 11 April 2014 General Weinstein was responsible for the firing of nine Air Force commanders in Malmstrom AFB, Montana.

In March 2017, Weinstein attended the Exchange Monitor Nuclear Deterrence Summit in Washington DC. When questioned there about the New START treaty, he said, "The reason you do a treaty is not to cut forces but to maintain strategic stability among world powers. And the New START treaty allowed us to maintain [that stability]. I think there is a huge value with what the New START treaty has provided." DefenseNews.com pointed out that this is in contrast to statements made by US President Donald J Trump who, in an interview with Reuters on 22 February 2017, called the New START treaty a "one-sided deal" and a "bad deal".

== Personal ==
In the 2024 United States presidential election, Weinstein endorsed Kamala Harris.

== Awards and decorations ==
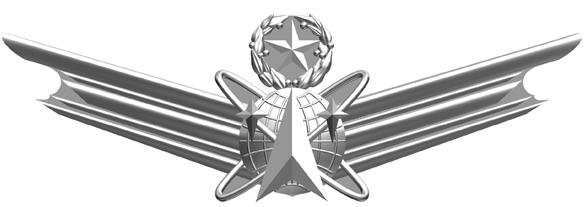
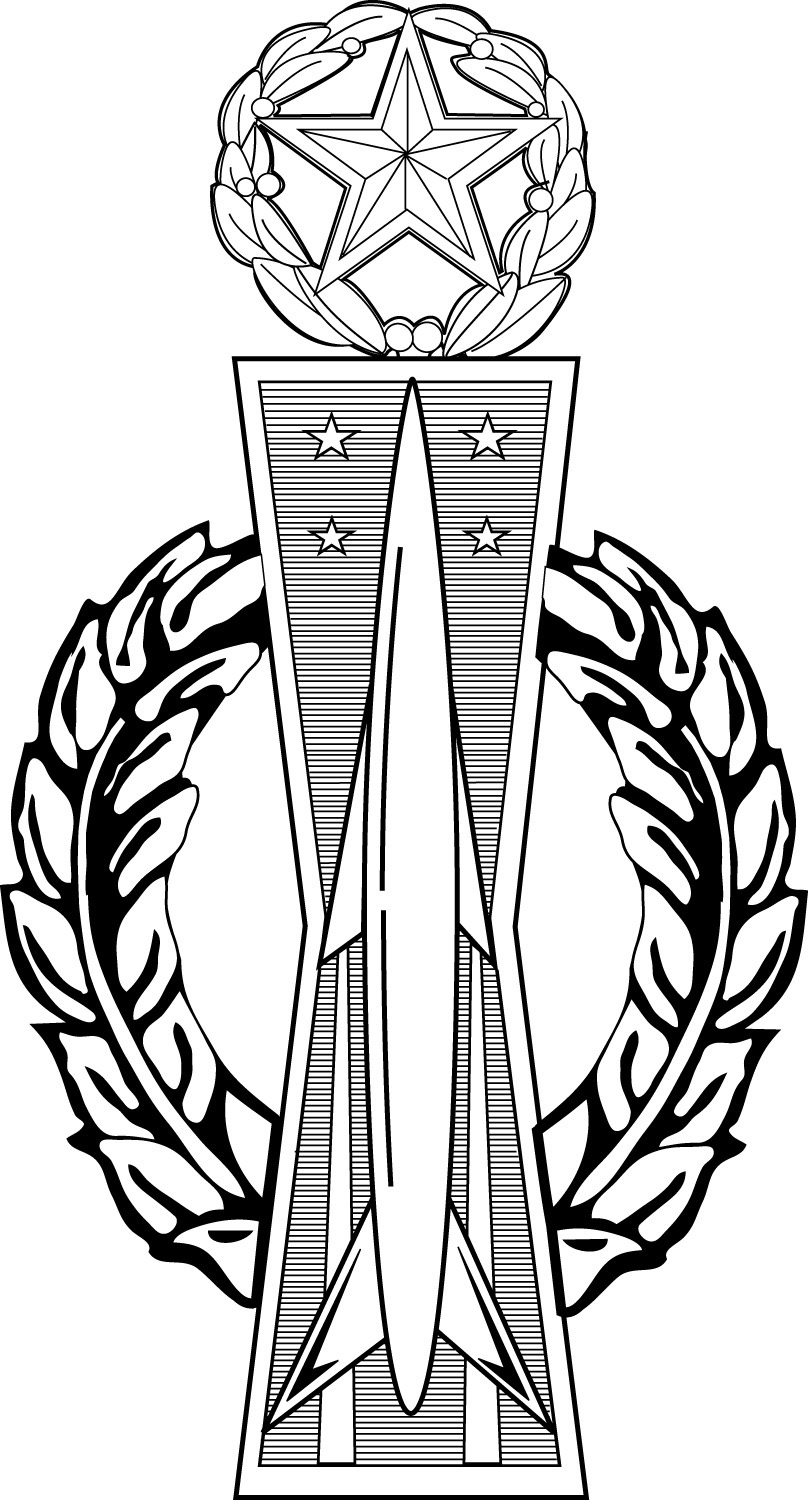
Command Space Operations Badge
Command Missile Operations Badge
Headquarters Air Force Badge

Air Force Distinguished Service Medal with two bronze oak leaf clusters
Defense Superior Service Medal
Legion of Merit with two oak leaf clusters
Defense Meritorious Service Medal
Meritorious Service Medal with three oak leaf clusters
Joint Service Commendation Medal
Air Force Commendation Medal with oak leaf cluster
Joint Meritorious Unit Award with two oak leaf clusters
Air Force Outstanding Unit Award with silver oak leaf cluster
Air Force Organizational Excellence Award
Combat Readiness Medal
National Defense Service Medal with one bronze service star
Armed Forces Expeditionary Medal
Global War on Terrorism Expeditionary Medal
Global War on Terrorism Service Medal
Military Outstanding Volunteer Service Medal
Nuclear Deterrence Operations Service Medal
Air Force Overseas Short Tour Service Ribbon
Air Force Expeditionary Service Ribbon with gold frame
Air Force Longevity Service Award with one silver and three bronze oak leaf clusters
Air Force Training Ribbon

== Education ==
- University of Massachusetts Lowell
- Embry-Riddle Aeronautical University
- John F. Kennedy School of Government - Harvard University
- Squadron Officer School
- Air Command and Staff College
- Industrial College of the Armed Forces

Military offices
Preceded by ???	Director of Plans, Programs, and Analyses of the Air Force Space Command; 2007–2009	Succeeded by John W. Raymond
Preceded by David L. Goldfein	Deputy Director of Programs of the United States Air Force; 2009–2011	Succeeded by ???
Preceded by David D. Thompson	Director of Air, Space and Cyberspace Operations of the Air Force Space Command; 2011–2012	Succeeded by David J. Buck
Preceded by Everett H. Thomas	Vice Commander of the Air Force Global Strike Command; 2013	Succeeded by Robert D. Rego
Preceded by Michael J. Carey	Commander of the Twentieth Air Force; 2013–2015	Succeeded by Anthony J. Cotton
Preceded by Garrett Harencak	Deputy Chief of Staff for Strategic Deterrence and Nuclear Integration of the United States Air Force; 2015–2018	Succeeded by Richard M. Clark
