= Vice Chief of Space Operations =

Second-highest-ranking military officer in the United States Space Force

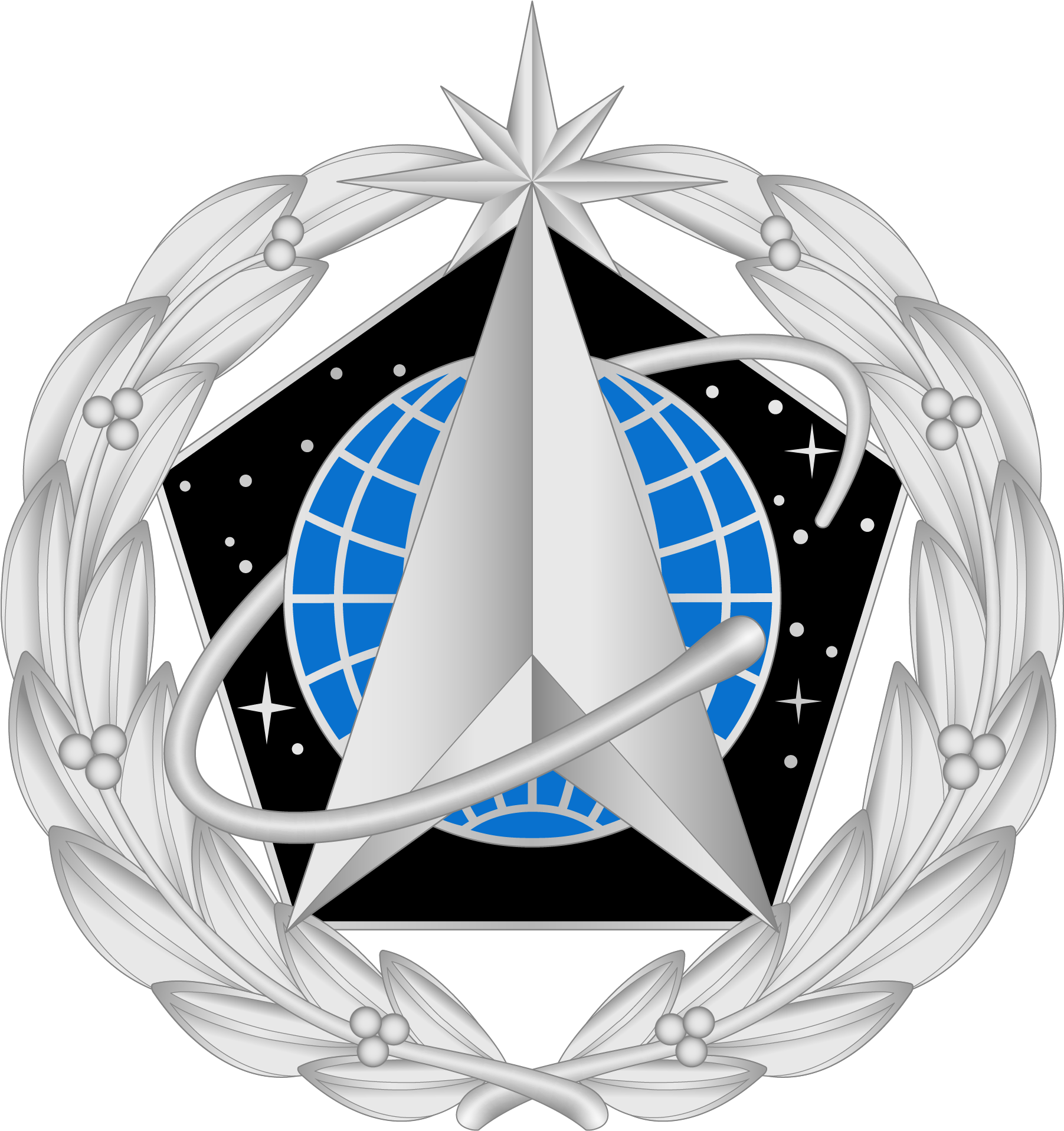
- Space Staff Identification Badge

- Flag of the vice chief of space operations

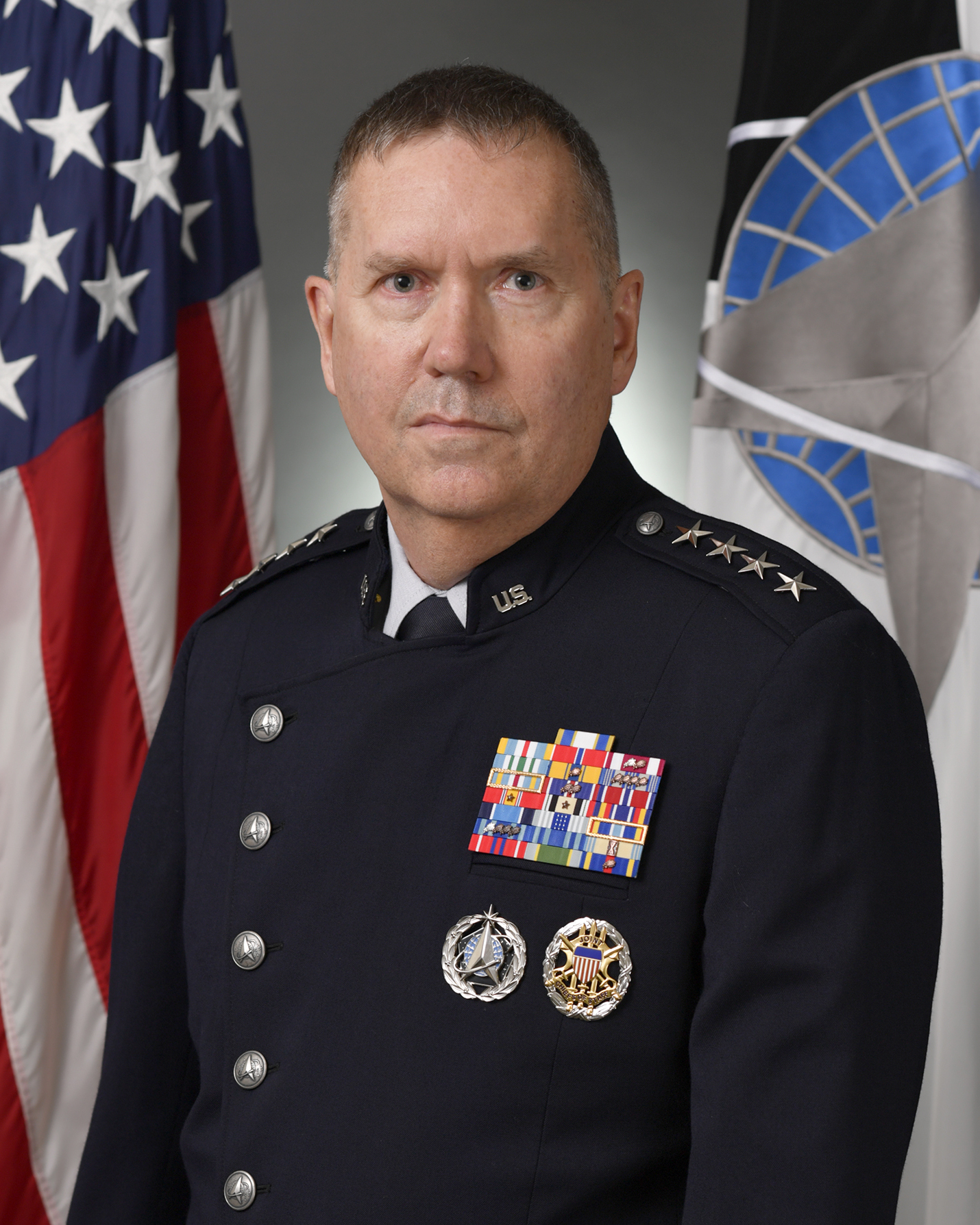
- Incumbent; General Shawn Bratton since 31 July 2025
- United States Space Force; Space Staff
- Abbreviation: VCSO
- Member of: Space Staff; Joint Requirements Oversight Council
- Reports to: Secretary of the Air Force; Chief of Space Operations
- Seat: The Pentagon, Arlington County, Virginia, United States
- Appointer: The president; with Senate advice and consent
- Constituting instrument: 10 U.S.C. § 9083
- Formation: 2 October 2020
- First holder: David D. Thompson

The vice chief of space operations (VCSO) is an office held by a four-star general in the United States Space Force. The vice chief directly supports the Chief of Space Operations (CSO) by serving as a member of the Joint Requirements Oversight Council (JROC) and also operates with the full authority of the chief of space operations during the CSO's absence. The VCSO is nominated for appointment by the president and confirmed by the Senate. The VCSO is the second-highest position in the U.S. Space Force, equivalent to other services' vice chief positions.

== History ==
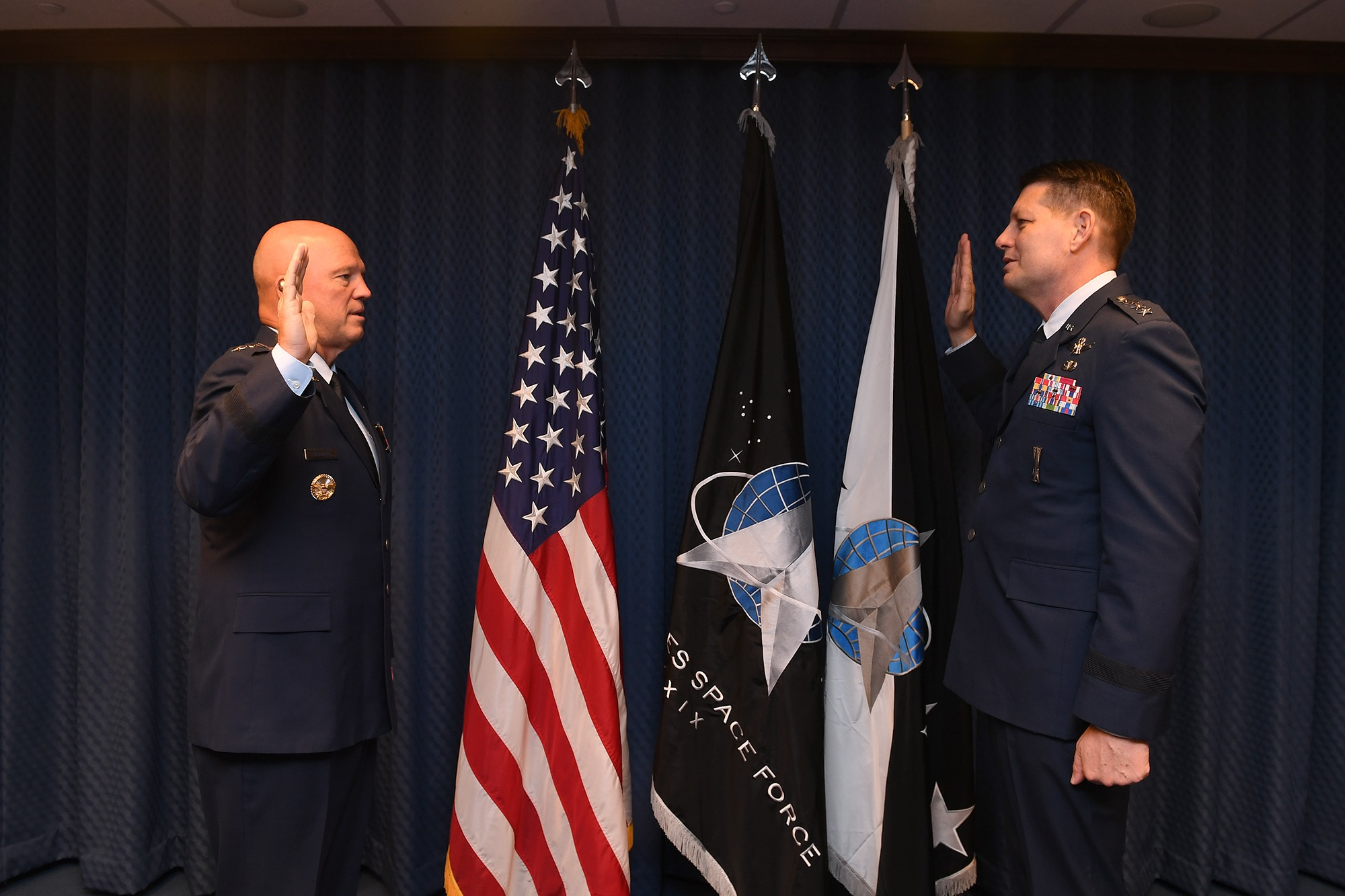
Gen John W. Raymond (left) promotes Lt Gen David D. Thompson to the rank of general during a ceremony in the Pentagon, 1 October 2020

In February 2020, the Space Force sent a report to the United States Congress on the service's proposed organizational structure, in which it outlines the plan for the position of the vice chief of space operations. The VCSO would be established as a four-star statutory position with duties and responsibilities equivalent to other service vice positions that would grant the VCSO parity with vice positions established in law in the other military services.

On August 6, 2020, Lieutenant General David D. Thompson was nominated for promotion to general and assignment as the first VCSO. The United States Senate confirmed him on September 30, 2020. Thompson was promoted on October 1, 2020, and assumed the position of VCSO the next day, October 2, 2020.

In 2023, Thompson retired from active duty. Lieutenant General Michael Guetlein, the nominee to succeed Thompson, wasn't confirmed by the Senate because of a hold placed by Senator Tommy Tuberville on all Department of Defense nominees, so Lieutenant General Philip Garrant, the most senior officer in the Space Staff, took over as acting VCSO.

In December 2024, both the House and Senate passed the National Defense Authorization Act for Fiscal Year 2025 to make the position of VCSO at statutory office and rank.

== List of vice chiefs of space operations ==
No.	Vice Chief of Space Operations		Term			Chief of Space Operations	Ref.
No.	Portrait	Name	Took office	Left office	Term length	Chief of Space Operations	Ref.
1	David D. Thompson	General; David D. Thompson (born 1963)	2 October 2020	14 December 2023	3 years, 73 days	John W. Raymond; B. Chance Saltzman	
–	Philip Garrant	Lieutenant General; Philip Garrant (born c. 1969); Acting	14 December 2023	21 December 2023	7 days	B. Chance Saltzman	
2	Michael Guetlein	General; Michael Guetlein (born 1967)	21 December 2023	20 July 2025	1 year, 211 days	B. Chance Saltzman	
–	DeAnna Burt	Lieutenant General; DeAnna Burt (born 1969); Acting	20 July 2025	31 July 2025	12 days	B. Chance Saltzman	
3	Shawn Bratton	General; Shawn Bratton (born 1968)	31 July 2025	Incumbent	1 year, 79 days	B. Chance Saltzman; Douglas Schiess	

== See also ==
- Secretary of the Air Force
- Chief of Space Operations
- Vice Chief of Staff of the Army
- Assistant Commandant of the Marine Corps
- Vice Chief of Naval Operations
- Vice Chief of Staff of the Air Force
- Vice Commandant of the Coast Guard
