= David J. Buck =

United States Air Force general

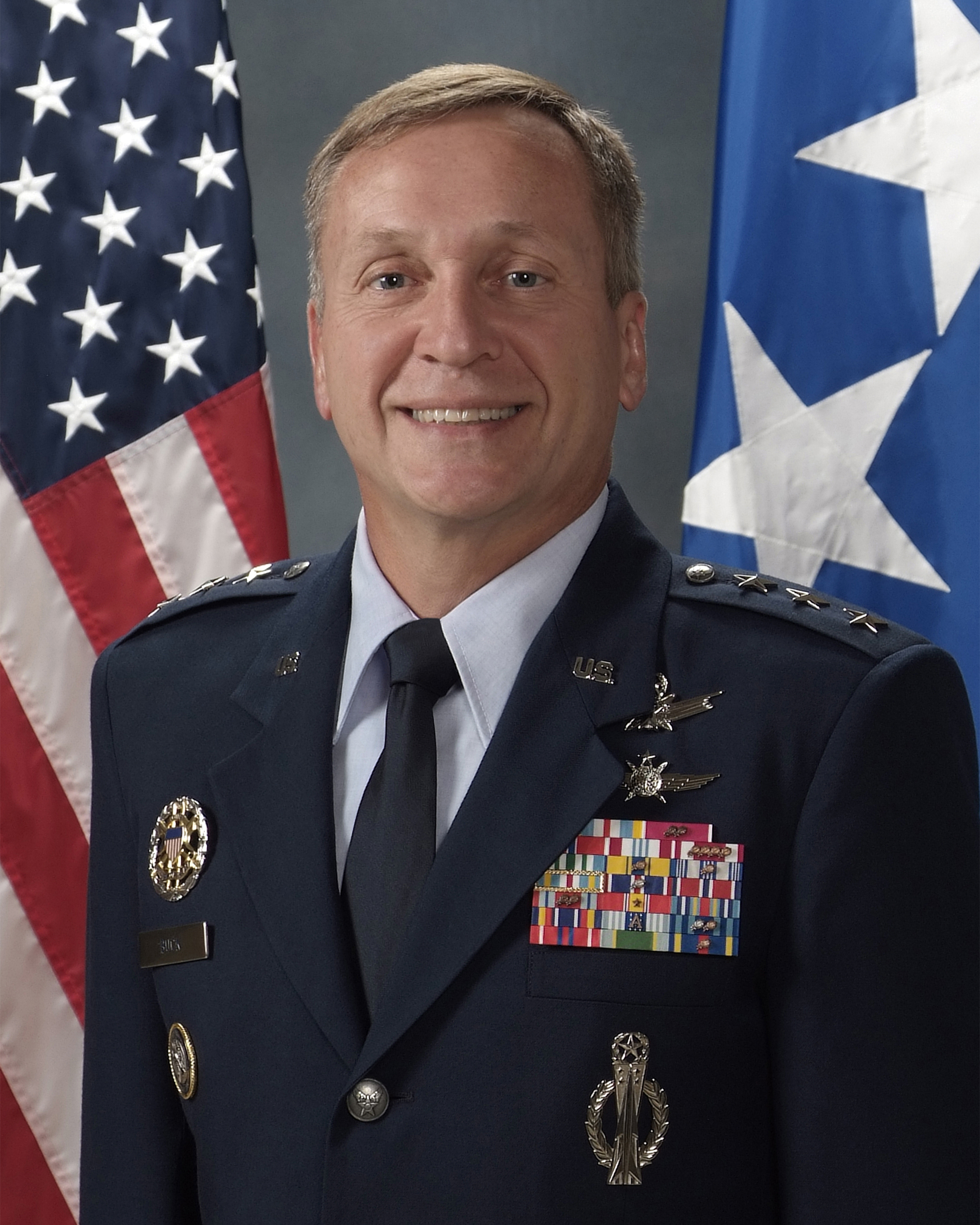
- Allegiance: United States
- Branch: United States Air Force
- Service years: 1986–2018
- Rank: Lieutenant general
- Commands: 14th Air Force; Air Force Space Command; Joint Force Space Component; 30th Space Wing; 1st Space Launch Squadron

David J. Buck is a retired lieutenant general in the United States Air Force. Prior to his retirement on February 1, 2018, Buck served as the commander of the 14th Air Force, Air Force Space Command, and the Joint Force Space Component at Vandenberg Air Force Base.

== Air Force career ==
David Buck graduated summa cum laude with a degree in business administration from Newman University (Kansas). In 1986, he graduated from Air Force Officer Training School, and commissioned as a second lieutenant. From 1986 to 1991, he served as a missile combat crew commander at Ellsworth Air Force Base. He then served in the 576th Flight Test Squadron at Vandenberg Air Force Base, Headquarters Air Force Space Command at Peterson Air Force Base, and attended the College of Naval Command and Staff. He commanded the 1st Space Launch Squadron at Cape Canaveral Air Force Station and the 821st Air Base Group at Thule Air Base. He then served as the vice commander of the 30th Space Wing and the commander of the 50th Space Wing. In 2010, Buck deployed for a year to direct Air Force Central Command space forces in southwest Asia. After serving as the vice command of the Air Force Warfare Center at Nellis Air Force Base, he served as the Director of Operation and the Vice Commander for Air Force Space Command. In August 2015, he assumed command of the 14th Air Force, Air Force Space Command, and the Joint Force Space Component. He retired on February 1, 2018.

== Awards and decorations ==
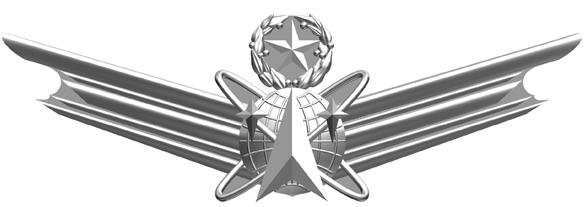
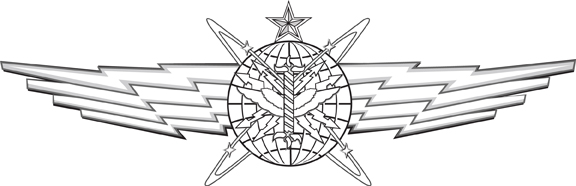
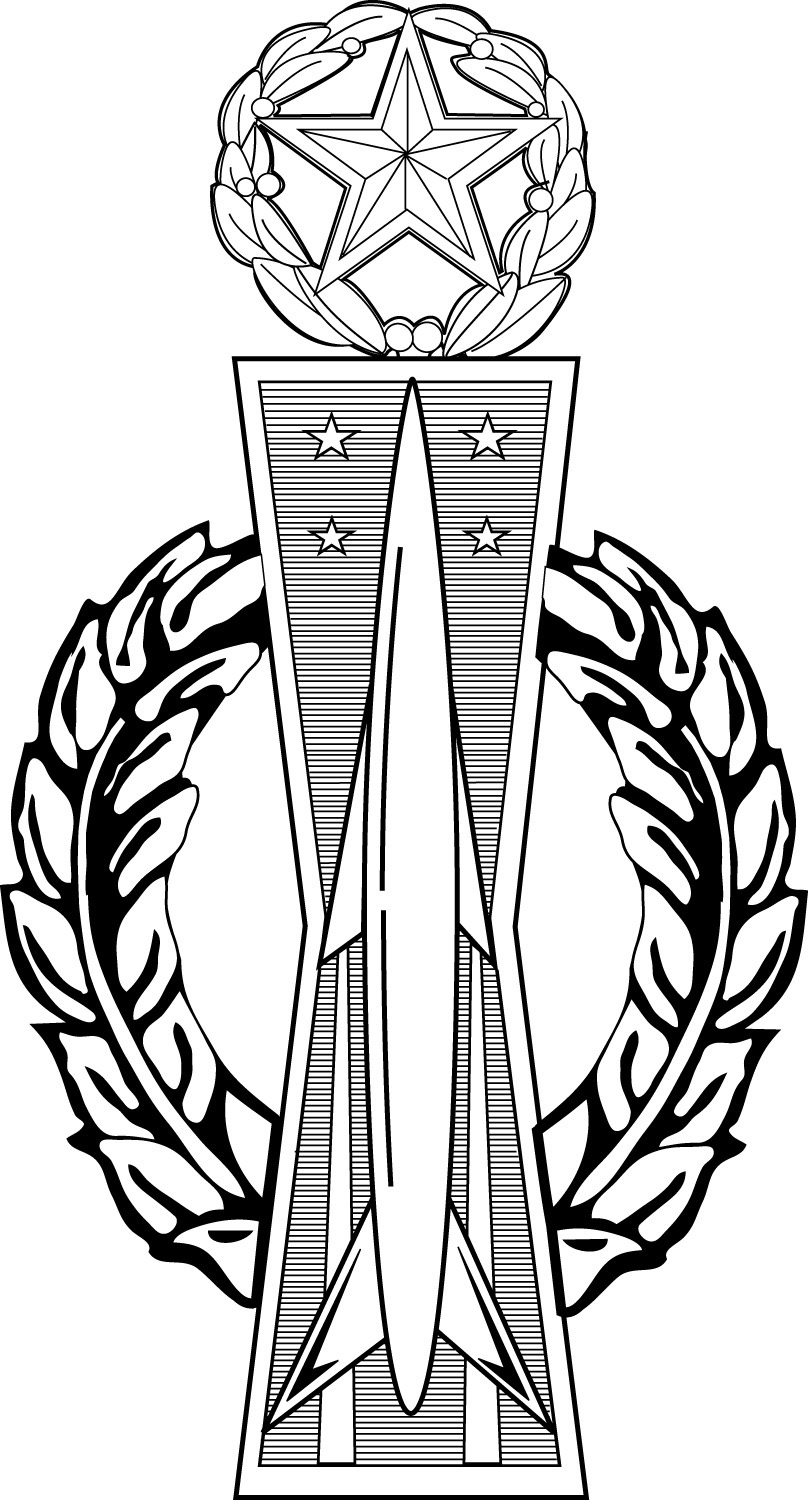
Command Space Operations Badge
Senior Cyberspace Operator Badge
Command Missile Operations Badge
United States Strategic Command Badge
Office of the Joint Chiefs of Staff Identification Badge

Air Force Distinguished Service Medal with one bronze oak leaf cluster
Defense Superior Service Medal
Legion of Merit with two oak leaf clusters
Bronze Star Medal
Defense Meritorious Service Medal
Meritorious Service Medal with four bronze oak leaf clusters
Joint Service Commendation Medal
Air Force Commendation Medal with oak leaf cluster
Air Force Achievement Medal with oak leaf cluster
Joint Meritorious Unit Award
Air Force Outstanding Unit Award with one silver oak leaf cluster
Organizational Excellence Award
Combat Readiness Medal with two oak leaf clusters
National Defense Service Medal with one bronze service star
Global War on Terrorism Expeditionary Medal
Global War on Terrorism Service Medal
Air Force Overseas Short Tour Service Ribbon with "A" (Arctic) device
Air Force Longevity Service Award with one silver and one bronze oak leaf cluster
NCO Professional Military Education Graduate Ribbon
Small Arms Expert Marksmanship Ribbon
Air Force Training Ribbon with oak leaf cluster

== Effective dates of promotion ==
Insignia	Rank	Date
	Lieutenant general	Aug 14, 2015
	Major general	Aug 8, 2014
	Brigadier general	May 6, 2011
	Colonel	July 1, 2005
	Lieutenant colonel	May 1, 2000
	Major	Aug 1, 1996
	Captain	June 10, 1990
	First lieutenant	June 10, 1988
	Second lieutenant	June 10, 1986

Military offices
Preceded by David D. Thompson	Director of Space Forces of the United States Air Forces Central Command; 2010–2011	Succeeded by Clinton Crosier
Preceded by David D. Thompson	Vice Commander of the Air Force Warfare Center; 2011–2013	Succeeded by Stephen Whiting
Preceded by Jack Weinstein	Director of Air, Space and Cyberspace Operations of the Air Force Space Command; 2013–2014	Succeeded by Stephen T. Denker
Preceded by John E. Hyten	Vice Commander of the Air Force Space Command; 2014–2015	Succeeded by David D. Thompson
Preceded by John W. Raymond	Commander of the Fourteenth Air Force and Joint Functional Component Command for Space; 2015–2017	Unit redesignated
