= Charles W. Raymond =

American military engineer (1842–1913)

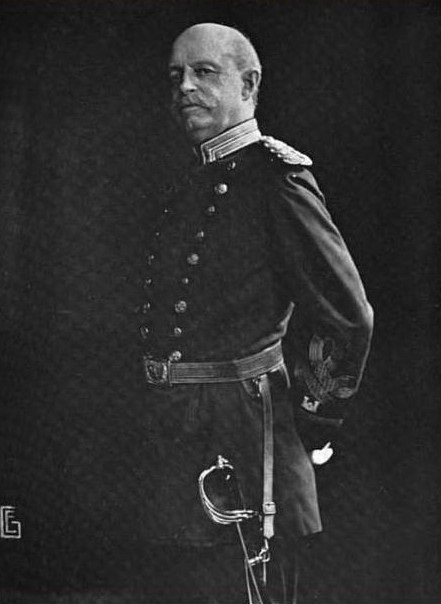
- Born: 14 January 1842; Hartford, Connecticut
- Died: 3 May 1913 (aged 71); Washington, D.C.
- Military career
- Allegiance: United States
- Branch: United States Army
- Service years: 1863, 1865–1904
- Rank: Brigadier General
- Commands: Philadelphia District, U.S. Army Corps of Engineers
- Conflicts: American Civil War

Engineer Commissioner of the District of Columbia
- In office 27 January 1888 – 14 February 1890
- President: Grover Cleveland; Benjamin Harrison
- Preceded by: William Ludlow
- Succeeded by: Henry Martyn Robert

Charles Walker Raymond (14 January 1842 – 3 May 1913) was a United States Army civil engineer and brigadier general. In 1869, he was the first U.S. government representative to visit the Yukon River Valley after the 1867 Alaska Purchase. Raymond later supervised the design engineering for the National Harbor of Refuge breakwater near the mouth of the Delaware River and the New York Tunnel Extension project for the Pennsylvania Railroad.

== Early life and education ==
Raymond was born in Hartford, Connecticut, and raised in New York City. Raymond and his older brother Rossiter W. Raymond attended the Brooklyn Polytechnic Institute where their uncle John H. Raymond was serving as president. After graduating, Charles Raymond entered the United States Military Academy in July 1861. As a second-year cadet, he was selected along with his classmates Reuben W. Petrikin and William Krause to serve as aides-de-camp to Major General Darius N. Couch in June and July 1863. General Couch was supervising the defense of the Susquehanna River Valley and Harrisburg, Pennsylvania, during that summer's Gettysburg campaign. Returning to West Point, he graduated first in his class in June 1865 and was directly commissioned as a first lieutenant in the United States Army Corps of Engineers. Among his classmates who attained general officer rank were Alfred E. Bates, John Patten Story, and George H. Burton, Samuel Meyers Mills Jr. Among his classmates who did not become general officers was Henry B. Ledyard Jr.

== Military career ==
In December 1866, Raymond was sent to the San Francisco area as an assistant engineer. He was promoted to captain on 21 March 1867. In March 1869, Raymond and an assistant were assigned to accompany an American fur company steamship on its 1,040-mile trip from the mouth of the Yukon River to Fort Yukon near the border of American territory. He mapped the river and surrounding valley and, upon arriving at Fort Yukon, conducted astronomical observations to determine the latitude and longitude of the fort. When Raymond determined that it had been built on what was now United States territory, he raised the American flag and ordered the Hudson's Bay Company personnel to withdraw eastward to Canadian territory. Since the steamship had already left, Raymond and his assistant then had to undertake the dangerous journey back downriver by themselves.

From August 1872 to July 1878, Raymond was assigned to teach natural and experimental philosophy at West Point. In March 1874, he was placed in charge of a U.S. expedition to Northern Tasmania to observe the December 1874 transit of Venus. After his return to the United States, Raymond was conferred an honorary Ph.D. degree by Lafayette College in 1875. He served as superintending engineer of construction at the Military Academy from August 1878 to August 1881.

From January 1883 to February 1886, Raymond supervised Corps of Engineers activities in Massachusetts. He was promoted to major on 20 February 1883. From January 1888 to February 1890, Raymond served as Engineer Commissioner for the District of Columbia.

On 13 February 1890, Raymond was placed in charge of all Corps of Engineers activities in Philadelphia and the Delaware River. His largest project during the twelve years that he held this position was construction of the National Harbor of Refuge breakwater at Cape Henlopen. Raymond was promoted to lieutenant colonel on 18 May 1898.

On 11 January 1902, Raymond was appointed chairman of the Board of Engineers for the New York Tunnel Extension project by Pennsylvania Railroad president Alexander J. Cassatt. He supervised Corps of Engineers activities in northeastern New Jersey from February to June 1902 and then again from August 1902 to June 1904. Raymond also supervised Corps activities on the southern shore of Long Island from February to June 1902. He was relieved of responsibility for the Philadelphia District in September 1902. On 23 January 1904, Raymond was promoted to colonel.

Having received written commendation from General Couch for his brief Civil War service, Raymond was promoted to brigadier general at the time of his retirement from active duty on 11 June 1904.

Raymond was a member of the American Society of Civil Engineers and the Washington Academy of Sciences.

== Family and later life ==
Raymond married Clara Wise (9 February 1842 – 30 November 1901) in Brooklyn in November 1866. They had fives sons and a daughter. After his wife's death, he remarried with Alice Denniston (Higgins) Krause (26 October 1853 – 12 May 1924), the widow of his West Point classmate William Krause, in Philadelphia in February 1904.

After his retirement, Raymond continued to serve as chairman of the Board of Engineers for the New York Tunnel Extension project. He lost his sight in 1912 and died in Washington, D.C., after going there for various medical treatments. He was buried at the West Point Cemetery on 5 May 1913.

== Legacy ==
His name is listed on the memorial plaque at the Seventh Avenue entrance to Pennsylvania Station in Manhattan. Fort Raymond (1942–1945) in Seward, Alaska was named in his honor. His great great grandson General John W. Raymond was the first commander of the United States Space Force.
