= Michael Carey (United States Air Force officer) =

United States Air Force general

Michael J. Carey
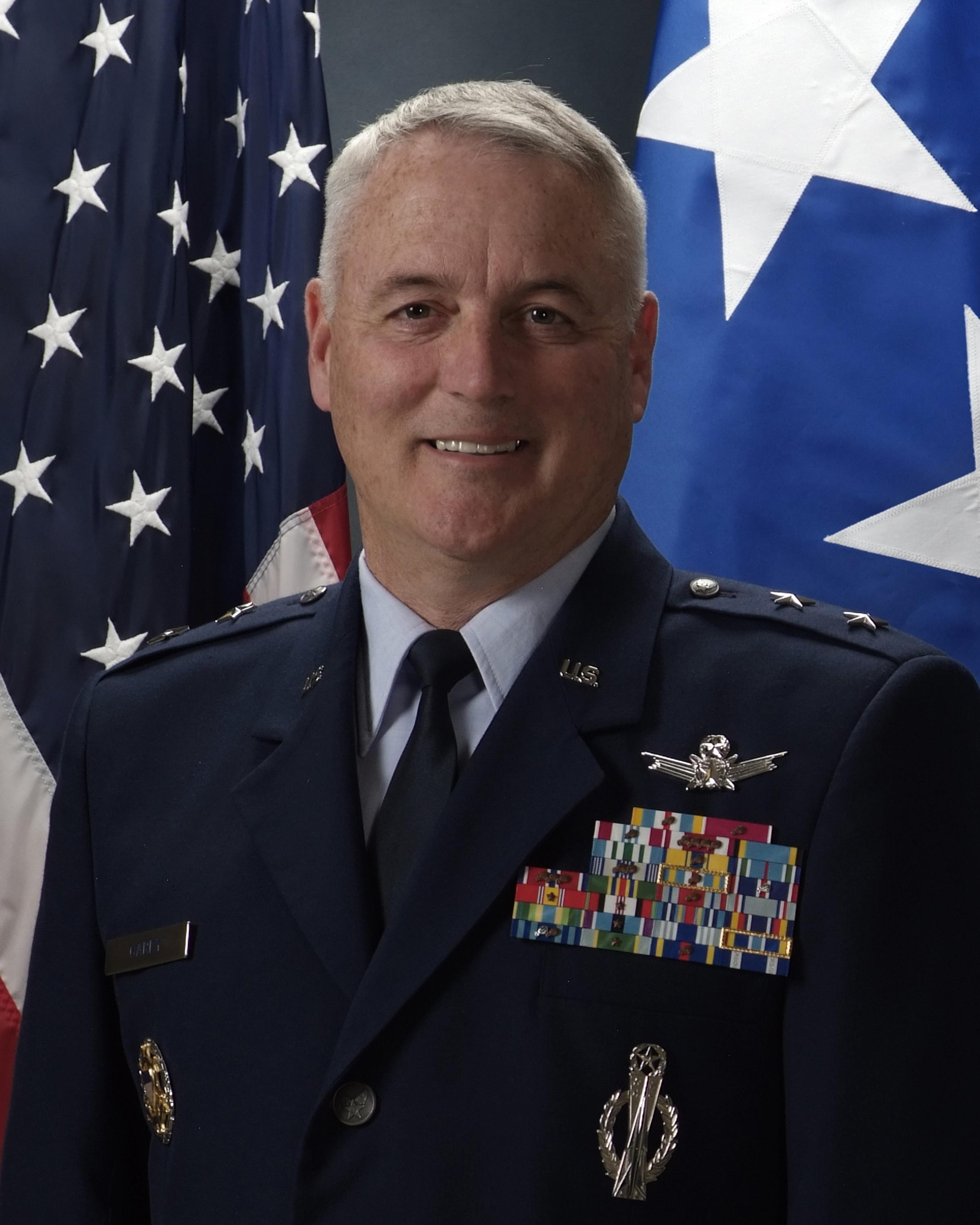
- Born: Michael Joseph Carey; 1960 (age 65–66); Arkansas
- Military career
- Allegiance: United States of America
- Branch: United States Air Force
- Service years: 1977–1983 (enlisted); 1983–2014 (officer)
- Rank: Major general (demoted to brigadier general)
- Nickname: Mike
- Awards: Defense Superior Service Medal (2); Legion of Merit (2)

Michael J. Carey (born 1960) is an American entrepreneur and one of four founders of ATLAS Space Operations, Inc. Upon retiring after 32 years of military service, he became CEO and President of AAC Microtec North America, Inc., founded M. Carey Consultants, LLC, and CompressWave, LLC. He is a retired American military officer who served in the United States Air Force. Enlisted on September 17, 1977, he retired on June 1, 2014, as a brigadier general, after 32 years of military service.

== Career ==
Carey enlisted in the Air Force in 1977. On April 29, 1983, he became a second lieutenant; on August 5, 1985 – first lieutenant; on August 5, 1987 – captain; on November 11, 1994 – major; on January 1, 1998 – lieutenant colonel; on August 1, 2002 – colonel; on November 14, 2008 – brigadier general; and on November 2, 2011, he was promoted to major general. His assignments included serving as deputy director of global operations, Global Operations Directorate, USSTRATCOM (March 2008 – August 2010); Chief, USSTRATCOM Forward Integration Team, Kabul, Afghanistan (June 2009 – August 2009); deputy director of command, control and nuclear operations (J3), Joint Staff, the Pentagon, Washington, D.C. (August 2010 – June 2012), among others.

In 2013, Carey was reprimanded and relieved of command of the 20th Air Force and Task Force 214 following incidents occurring during the two-day U.S.-Russian Federation Nuclear Security Exercise in Sergeiv Posad, Moscow, Russia. During the event, it was reported that Carey had consumed excessive alcohol and otherwise behaved in a manner unbecoming an officer. On April 10, 2014, it was announced that Carey would retire on June 1, 2014, in the rank of brigadier general.

Upon retirement from the USAF, Gen Carey founded a consultancy, M. Carey Consultants, LLC as a Traverse City, Michigan-based small business that provides leadership training and advising, as well as defense-related advice to clients.

== Education ==
- 1982 Bachelor of Arts degree in history, University of Central Florida, Orlando
- 1986 Squadron Officer School, Maxwell AFB, Alabama
- 1988 Master of Public Administration degree, University of Oklahoma, Norman
- 1995 Air Command and Staff College (distinguished graduate), Maxwell AFB, Alabama
- 1998 Armed Forces Staff College, Joint and Combined Staff Officer School, Norfolk, Virginia
- 1999 Air War College, by correspondence
- 2001 Master of Arts degree in national security and strategic studies (with distinction), Naval War College, Newport, Rhode Island
- 2005 National Security Fellow, Maxwell School, Syracuse University, New York
- 2008 National Committee on U.S.-China Relations China Seminar, New York
- 2010 U.S.–Russia Course, Harvard University, Cambridge, Mass.

== Awards and decorations ==
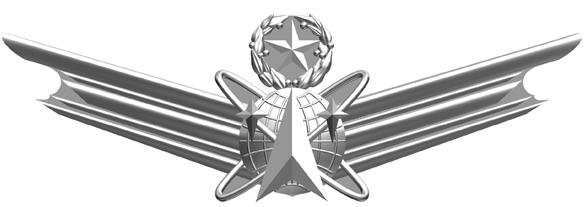
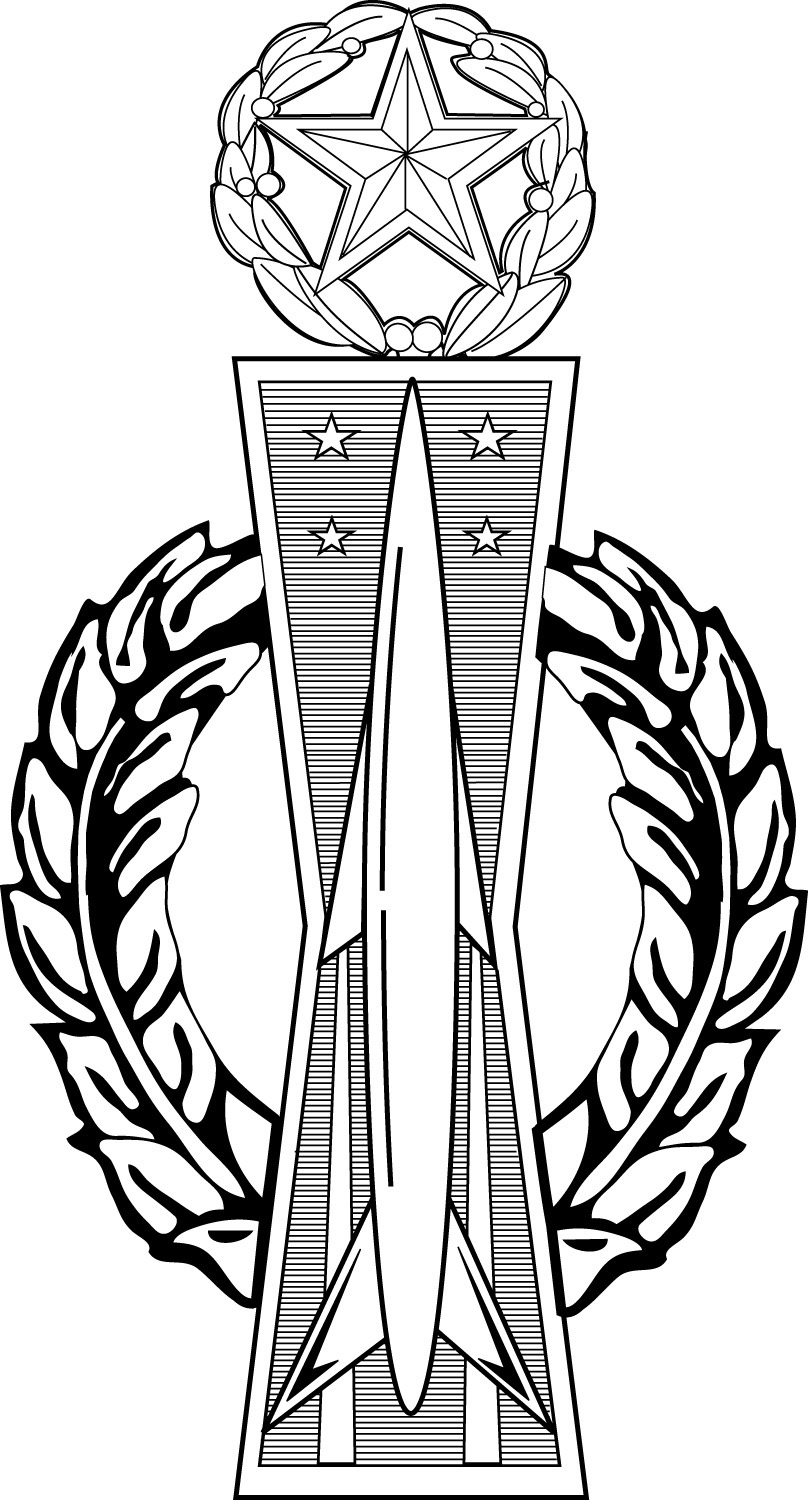
Command Space Operations Badge
Master Aircrew Badge (Officer)
Master Missile Operations Badge
Office of the Joint Chiefs of Staff Identification Badge

Defense Superior Service Medal with one bronze oak leaf cluster
Legion of Merit with oak leaf cluster
Defense Meritorious Service Medal with oak leaf cluster
Meritorious Service Medal with four oak leaf clusters
Aerial Achievement Medal
Joint Service Commendation Medal
Air Force Commendation Medal with oak leaf cluster
Joint Service Achievement Medal
Air Force Achievement Medal with two oak leaf clusters
Joint Meritorious Unit Award with oak leaf cluster
Navy Meritorious Unit Commendation
Air Force Outstanding Unit Award with silver oak leaf cluster
Air Force Organizational Excellence Award with three oak leaf clusters
Combat Readiness Medal with oak leaf cluster
Air Force Good Conduct Medal
National Defense Service Medal with one bronze service star
Afghanistan Campaign Medal with one service star
Global War on Terrorism Expeditionary Medal
Global War on Terrorism Service Medal
Armed Forces Service Medal
Humanitarian Service Medal with oak leaf cluster
Air Force Overseas Long Tour Service Ribbon
Air Force Expeditionary Service Ribbon with gold frame
Air Force Longevity Service Award with one silver and three bronze oak leaf clusters
Small Arms Expert Marksmanship Ribbon with service star
Air Force Training Ribbon with oak leaf cluster
NATO Medal for service with ISAF
