= John W. Raymond =

1st U.S. Space Force chief of space operations

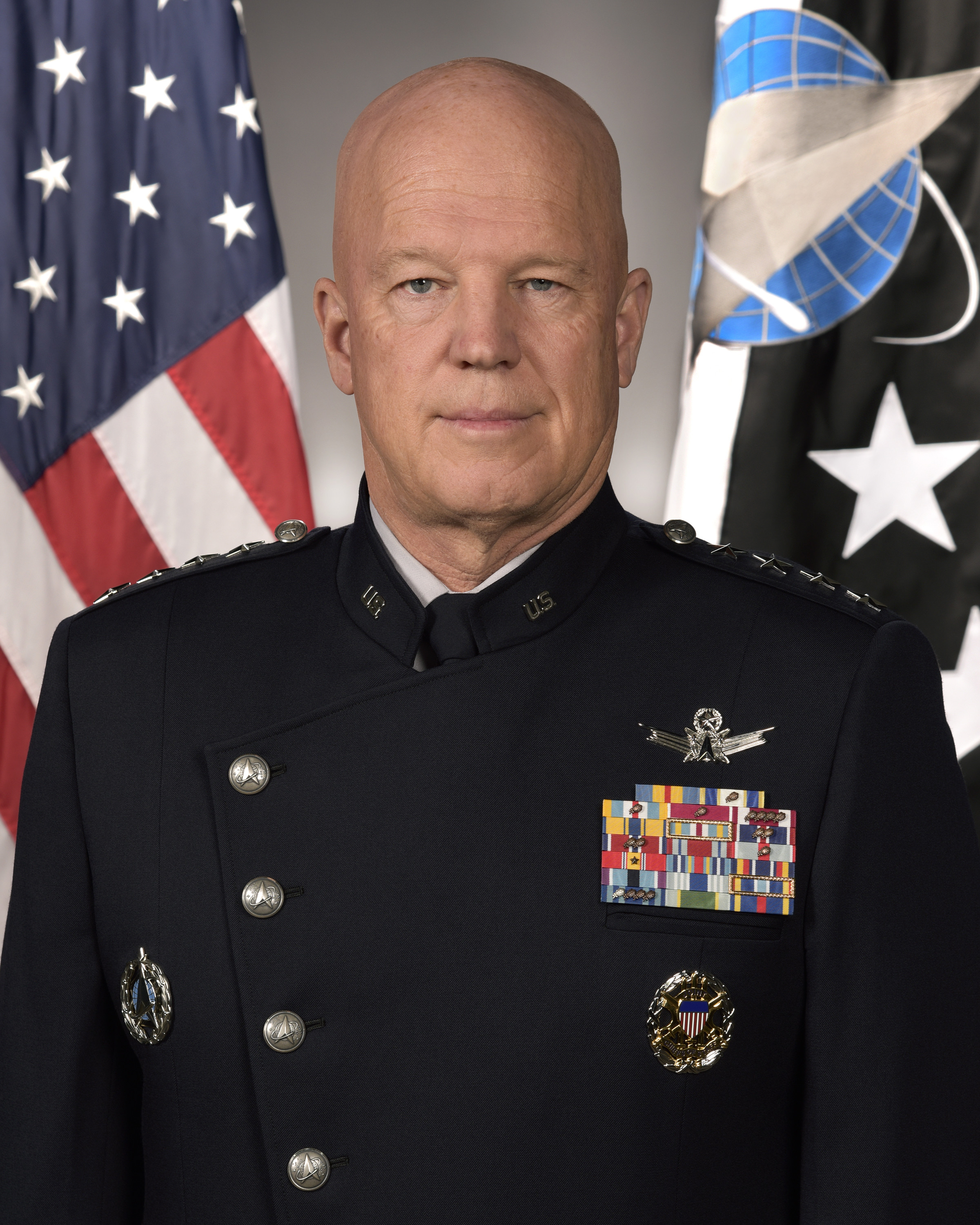
- Official portrait, 2022
- Born: April 30, 1962 (age 64); Monterey County, California, U.S.
- Alma mater: Clemson University (BS); Central Michigan University (MS); Naval War College (MA)
- Spouse: Mollie Raymond (m. 1987)
- Relatives: Charles W. Raymond (great great grandfather)
- Military career
- Allegiance: United States
- Branch: United States Air Force: United States Space Force
- Service years: 1984–2019 (Air Force): 2019–2023 (Space Force)
- Rank: General
- Nickname: Jay
- Commands: Chief of Space Operations; United States Space Command; Air Force Space Command; Joint Force Space Component Command; Fourteenth Air Force; Joint Functional Component Command for Space; 30th Operations Group; 5th Space Surveillance Squadron
- Conflicts: War in Afghanistan; Iraq War
- Awards: Defense Distinguished Service Medal (2); Air Force Distinguished Service Medal (2); Defense Superior Service Medal (2); Legion of Merit (2)

John William Raymond (born April 30, 1962) is a retired United States Space Force general who served as the first chief of space operations from 2019 to 2022. The first guardian, he served as commander of the United States Space Command from 2019 to 2020.

Raised in a military family, Raymond was commissioned into the United States Air Force in 1984 after graduating from Clemson University. A career missile and space operations officer, he has commanded the 5th Space Surveillance Squadron, 30th Operations Group, Fourteenth Air Force, Joint Force Space Component Command, and Air Force Space Command. He has been deployed to serve in the War in Afghanistan and the Iraq War.

In 2016, Raymond assumed command of the Air Force Space Command and, in 2019, assumed additional duties as unified combatant command commander following the reestablishment of the U.S. Space Command. When the U.S. Space Force was established, he became the first chief of space operations. He also became the first member of the Space Force, ending his over 35 years of service in the Air Force.

For his work in leading the initial building of the Space Force, Raymond has been described as the "father of the Space Force". As the first chief of space operations, he oversaw the standup of new Space Force organizations, transfer of personnel from other military branches, consolidation of space units from other services, and setting its culture. He relinquished his post as chief of space operations in 2022 and retired from military service in 2023.

Following his retirement from military service, Raymond joined the board of directors of Axiom Space and Impulse Space. He also serves as a senior managing director Cerberus Capital Management and a visiting fellow at the Hoover Institution.

== Early life and education ==
Born in Monterey County, California, and raised in Alexandria, Virginia, John William Raymond is the son of Barbara Ryan and retired United States Army Colonel John Allen Raymond (1935–2016). Since 1865, his family has had graduates from United States Military Academy in West Point, New York, including his great great grandfather, great grandfather, grandfather, and father. His great great grandfather, Army Brigadier General Charles Walker Raymond, graduated as the top cadet of his class in 1865. As an Army captain, civil engineer Charles Raymond commanded a delegation that went to Northern Tasmania to time the transit of Venus in December 1874. His father was a 1958 graduate of West Point, where he once taught astronomy. He attended Thomas Jefferson High School and graduated in 1980.

Raymond graduated from Clemson University in 1984 with a B.S. degree in administrative management before he was commissioned in the United States Air Force. He later earned an M.S. degree from the Central Michigan University in 1990 and an M.A. degree in national security and strategic studies from the Naval War College in 2003. He also attended Squadron Officer School in 1990, Air Command and Staff College in 1997, and the Joint Forces Staff College in 2007. He also completed Air University's Combined Force Air Component Commander Course and Joint Flag Officer Warfighting Course.

== Military career ==
=== United States Air Force ===
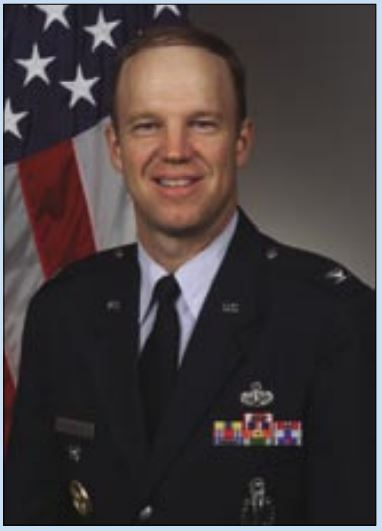
Raymond in 2005 as a colonel

Raymond was commissioned in the Air Force in 1984 as a second lieutenant following his graduation from Clemson University. The following year, he was assigned to the 321st Strategic Missile Wing as a missile combat crew commander at Grand Forks Air Force Base. From 1989 to 1993, Raymond was an operations center officer controller with the 1st Strategic Aerospace Division and executive officer of the 30th Space Wing at Vandenberg Air Force Base. In 1993, he was assigned to Air Force Space Command as chief of commercial space lift operations and assistant chief of current operations and, in 1996, as deputy director for commander-in-chief's action group.

In 1997, after attending Air Command and Staff College, Raymond was stationed at the Pentagon first as a space and missile Force programmer at the Air Force headquarters and then as chief of expeditionary aerospace force space and program integration. He remained there until 2000, at which time he assumed command of the 5th Space Surveillance Squadron located at RAF Feltwell in England. The following year, Raymond returned to the United States and became deputy commander of the 21st Operations Group. From 2002 to 2003, he studied at Naval War College. For two years after that, he was assigned as a transformation strategist to the Office of the United States Secretary of Defense. In 2005, he returned to Vandenberg Air Force Base and assumed command of the 30th Operations Group. He held that position until 2007, when he was named Commander of the 21st Space Wing.

In 2009, Raymond was reassigned to Air Force Space Command as director of plans, programs, and analyses. From December 2010 to July 2012, he served as vice commander of the Fifth Air Force and deputy commander of the Thirteenth Air Force at Yokota Air Base, Japan. From July 2012 to January 2014, he served as director of plans and policy of the United States Strategic Command at Offutt Air Force Base.

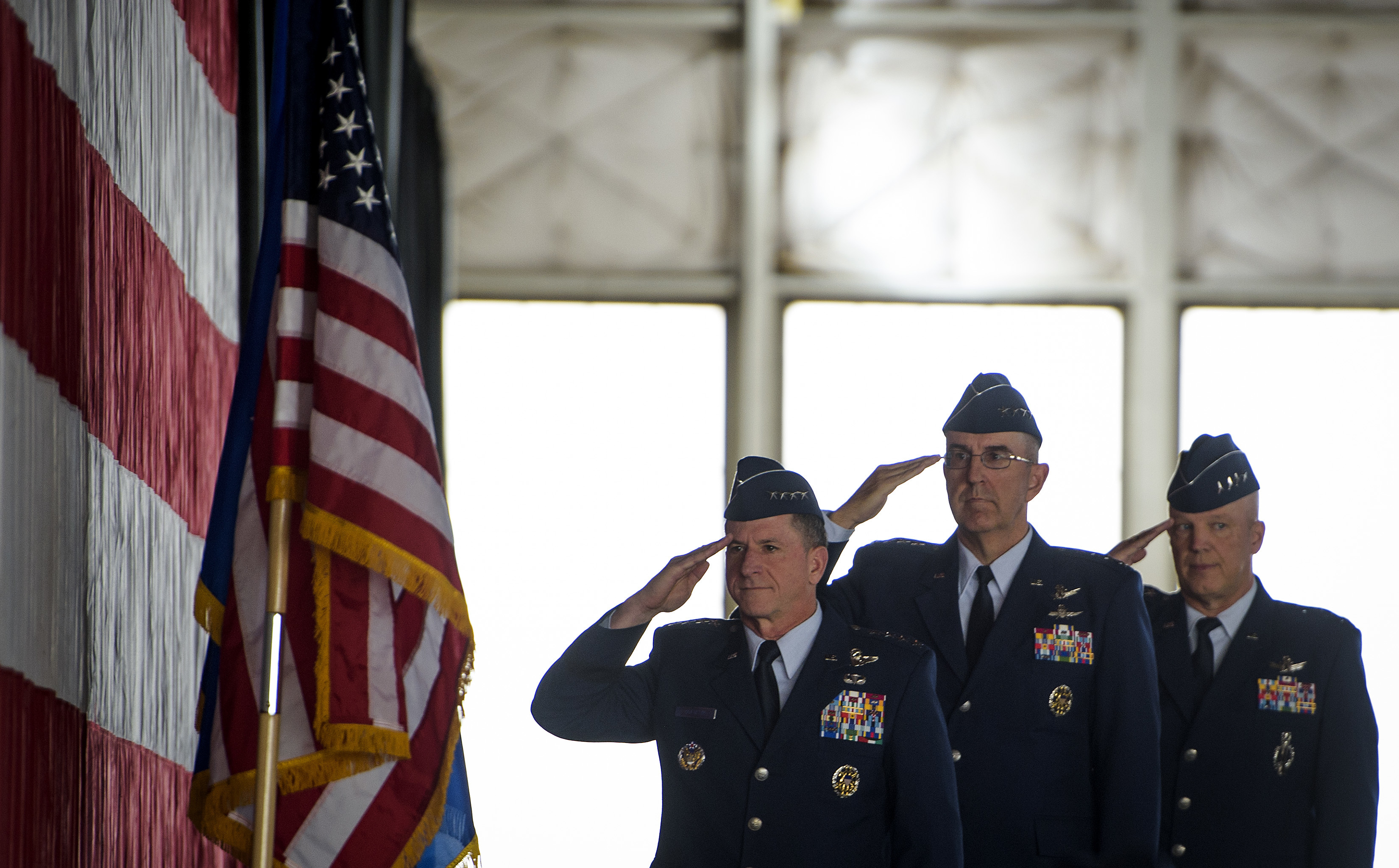
Raymond (right) with Gen Goldfein (left) and Gen Hyten (center) during the 2016 Air Force Space Command change of command

Raymond was promoted to lieutenant general on January 31, 2014, and assumed command of the Fourteenth Air Force and the Joint Functional Component Command for Space at Vandenberg. He replaced Lieutenant General Susan Helms who was retiring after her failed nomination as Air Force Space Command vice commander. He relinquished command to Lieutenant General David J. Buck on August 14, 2015, to return to the Pentagon and serve as the deputy chief of staff for operations of the U.S. Air Force.

Raymond was nominated for promotion to the rank of general and to the command of Air Force Space Command on September 8, 2016. This nomination was confirmed by the United States Senate on September 15. He assumed command of the Air Force Space Command on October 27, 2016, replacing John E. Hyten who was then tapped to become the commander of United States Strategic Command. On December 1, 2017, the Joint Functional Component Command for Space was restructured as the Joint Force Space Component Command and Raymond was dual-hatted as commander of the newly reorganized unit under U.S. Strategic Command.

==== United States Space Command ====
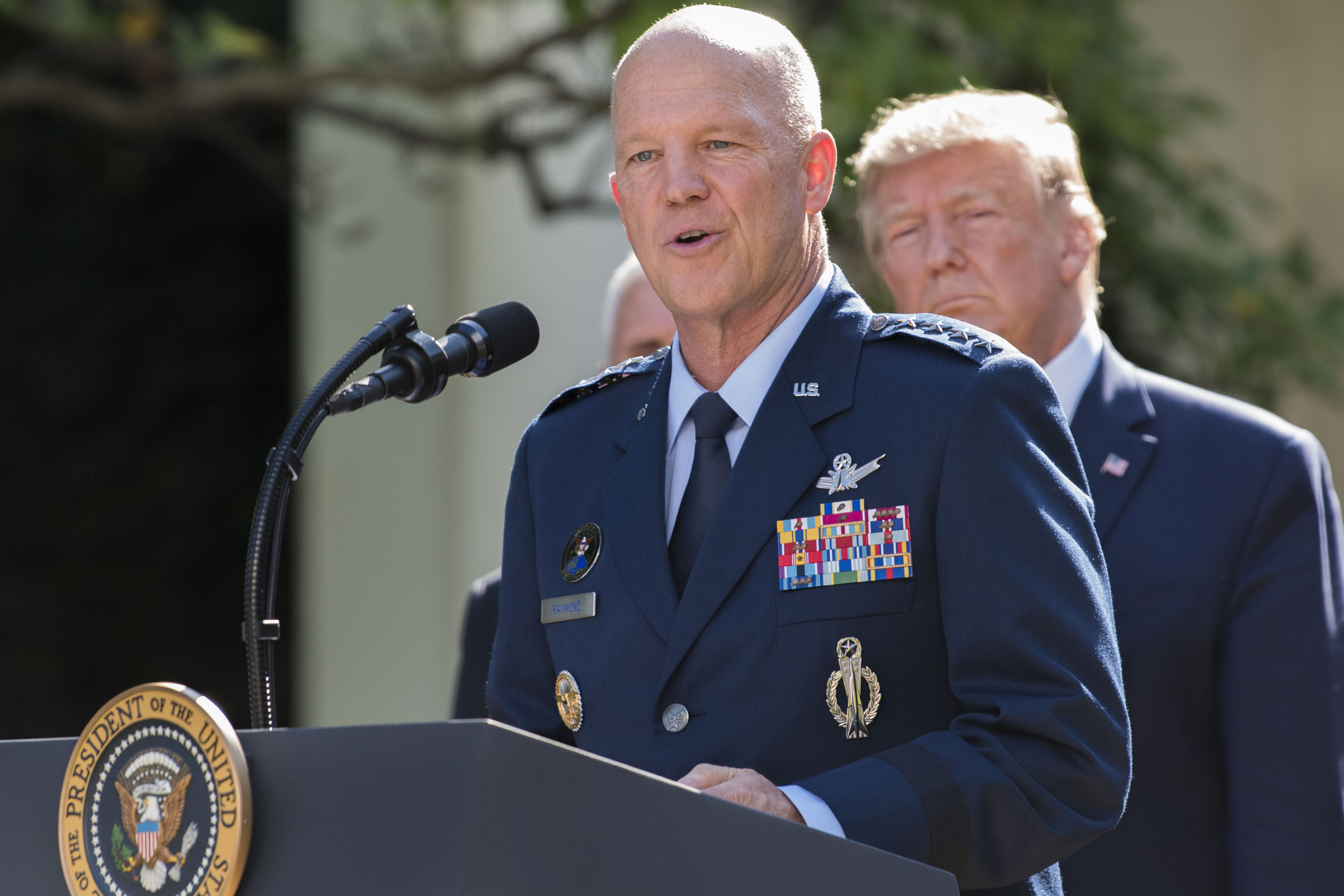
Raymond speaks at the White House ceremony establishing of the U.S. Space Command, August 29, 2019

By 2018, plans were made to reestablish the United States Space Command and Raymond was tasked to plan for its standup. He asked five planners to help him plan such standup, including U.S. Army Brigadier General Thomas L. James and U.S. Air Force Brigadier General Shawn Bratton, and then-Brigadier General David N. Miller to lead a task force that did the detailed planning. On March 22, 2019, he was nominated to lead that unified combatant command, and was then confirmed by the United States Senate on June 27. He assumed command of the newly reestablished U.S. Space Command on August 29, 2019, while retaining command of Air Force Space Command.

Raymond is a proponent for declassifying space capabilities and intelligence as a way for deterring adversaries opening more dialogue about space threats. Along with Admiral Philip S. Davidson and seven other combatant commanders, he signed a memo—called informally as the "36-star memo"—addressed to the United States Intelligence Community that called for declassifying space-related intelligence.

In February 2020, Raymond called out Russia for "threatening behavior" in outer space, threatening a U.S. national security satellite. This was the first time the U.S. military has publicly identified a direct threat to a specific American satellite by an adversary.

While being the chief of the new military service, he continued serving as commander of the U.S. Space Command until August 20, 2020, when he relinquished command to his deputy, General James H. Dickinson. The National Defense Authorization Act for Fiscal Year 2020, which also created the Space Force, included a provision which allowed the chief of space operations to concurrently serve as commander of the combatant command for one year.

=== United States Space Force ===
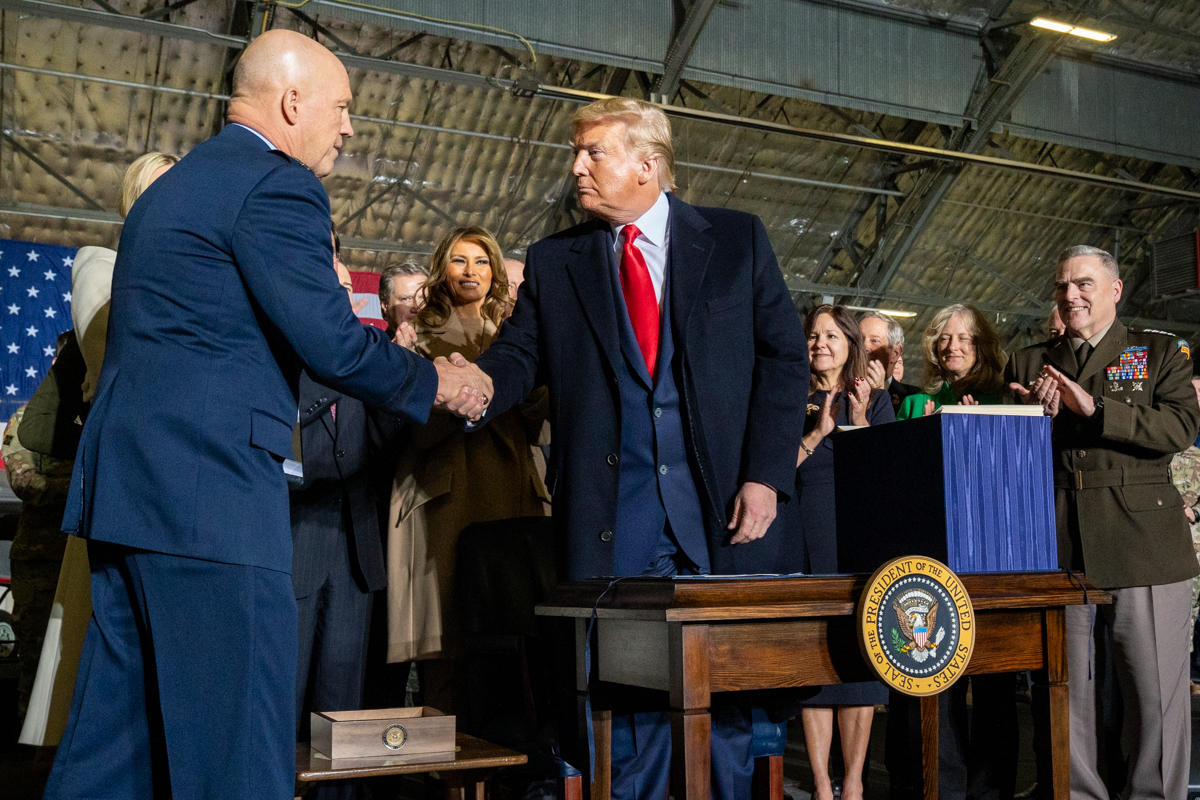
Raymond shaking President Donald Trump's hand after being named as the first chief of space operations, December 20, 2019.

When the creation of the Space Force or space corps was debated, Raymond initially did not support the idea of creating a separate space corps. In 2017, he wrote in a Defense One article that while he applauded the increased focus on space as a warfighting domain, what is needed instead is deeper integration and more resources. By April 2019, he reversed his position, supporting the Trump administration's proposal to establish the Space Force under the Department of the Air Force.

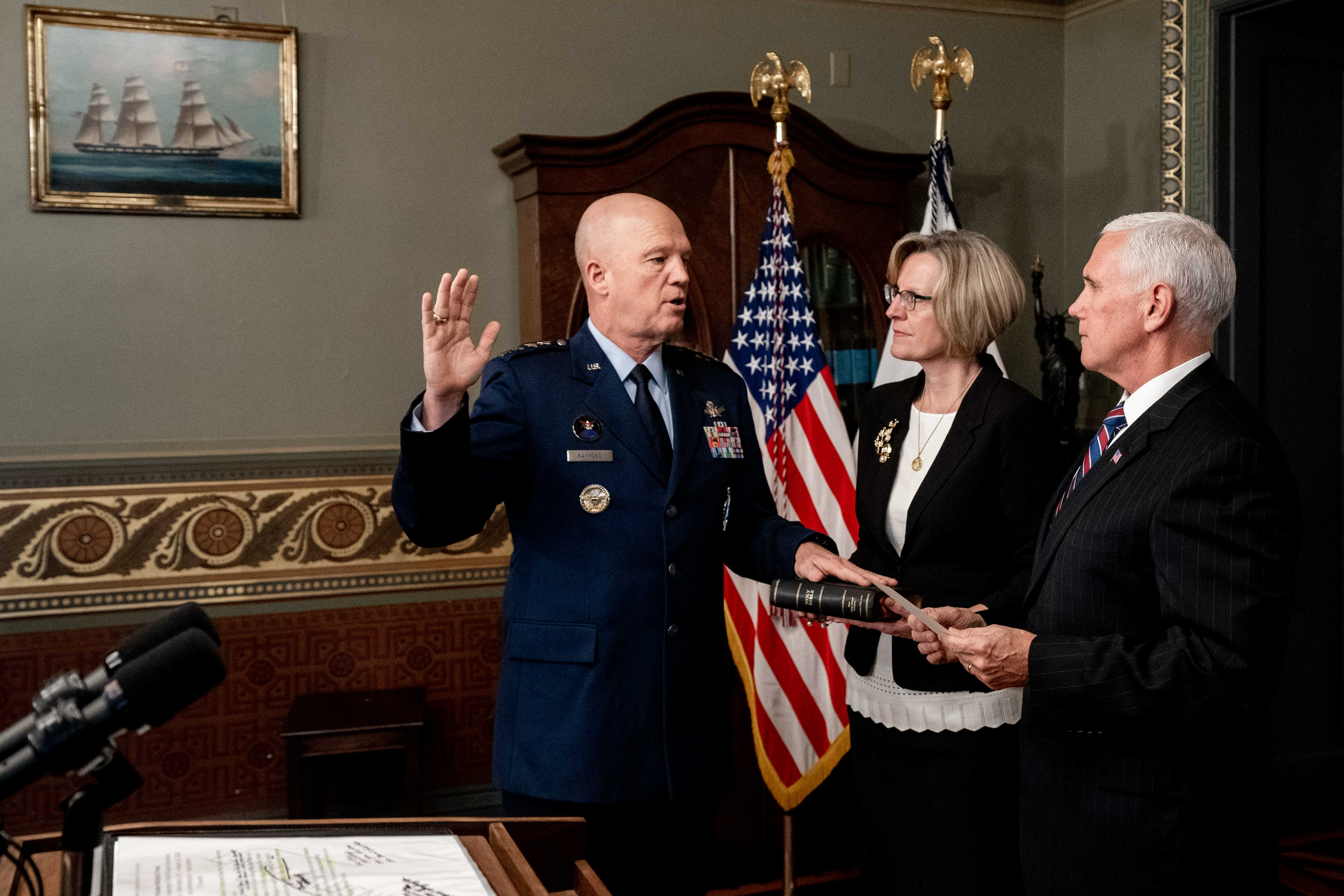
Raymond being sworn in as the first chief of space operations by Vice President Mike Pence, January 14, 2020

On December 20, 2019, the U.S. Space Force was established by redesignating the Air Force Space Command as a separate service. Raymond, then commander of Air Force Space Command, was appointed as the first chief of space operations. According to President Donald Trump, "With today's signing I will proudly appoint Gen. Jay Raymond the first chief of space operations and he will become the very first member of the Space Force and he will be on the Joint Chiefs." By becoming the first member of the Space Force, he left the Air Force after over 35 years of military service. He was officially sworn in by Vice President Mike Pence on January 14, 2020.

In November 2020, Raymond released the Chief of Space Operations' Planning Guidance where he outlined his five priorities as the service chief of the Space Force: building a lean and agile service, developing joint warfighters, delivering new capabilities, expand international cooperation, and creating a digital service. He also ordered the creation of the Space Warfighting Analysis Center and National Space Intelligence Center.

The law that created the Space Force stated that the chief of space operations will become a member of the Joint Chiefs of Staff only a year after its enactment, but Raymond was allowed to join the Joint Chiefs immediately because then-Secretary of Defense Mark Esper and Chairman of the Joint Chiefs of Staff Mark Milley viewed it important to national security. In December 2020, Raymond became an official member of the Joint Chiefs of Staff, his office becoming the 8th member of the Joint Chiefs. Together with other members of the Joint Chiefs of Staff, Raymond denounced the 2021 United States Capitol attack.

Raymond, and almost all the other Joint Chiefs of Staff members, went into quarantine in October 2020 after coming into contact with Admiral Charles Ray, who tested positive for COVID-19.

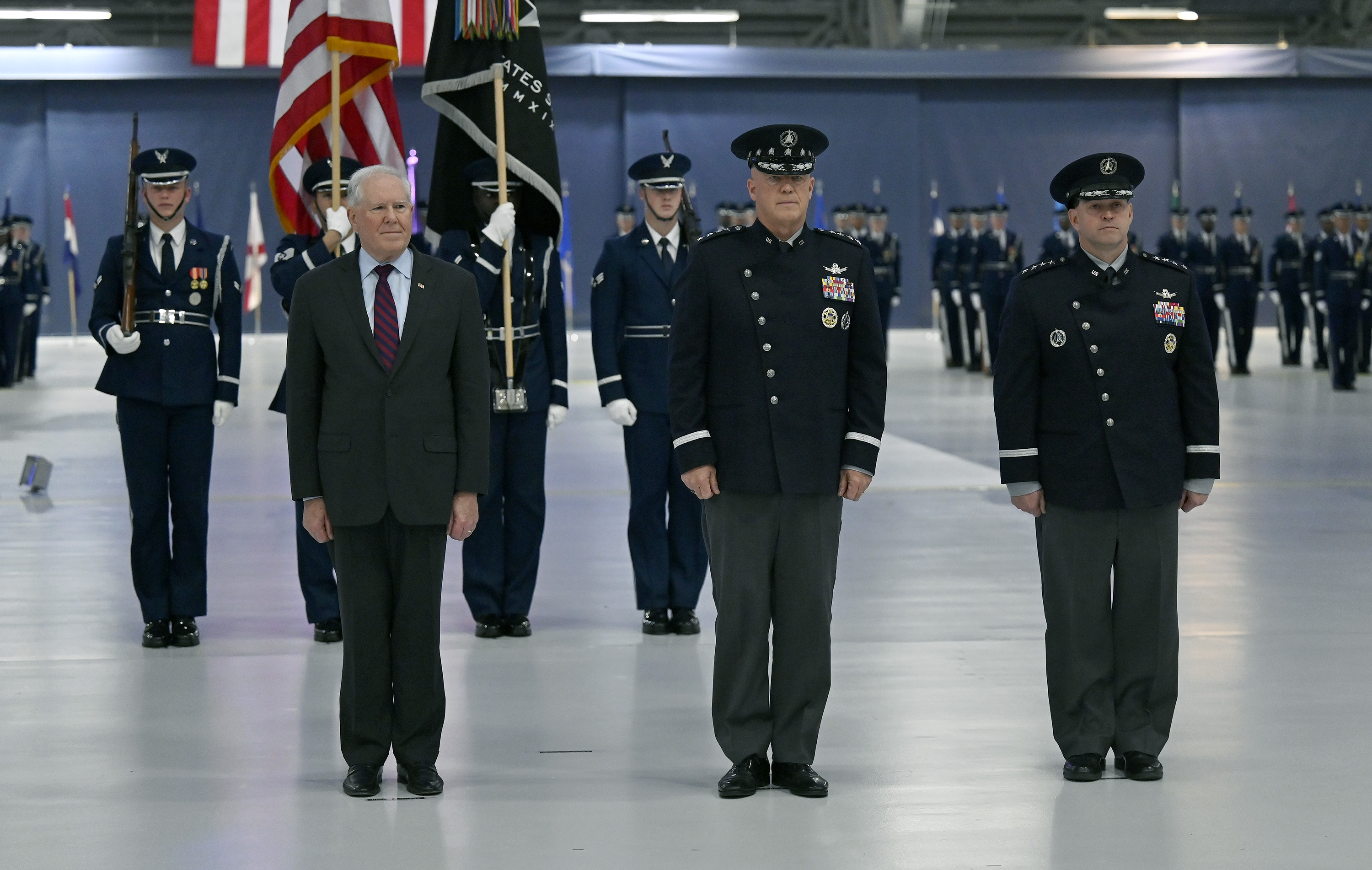
Raymond (center) transferred responsibility to Saltzman (right) in 2022 in the Space Force's first change of responsibility ceremony.

Raymond pushes for international norms of behavior for the space domain. Without those norms of behavior, he likened space as the "Wild, Wild West." This "rules of the road" for space is what he wants to pass on to his successors. In November 2021, he wrote an opinion piece for the Washington Post, detailing what the Space Force is doing to establish international norms and standards of behavior in space.

On November 2, 2022, Raymond transferred responsibility as chief of space operations to B. Chance Saltzman. During the ceremony, Secretary Frank Kendall III called Raymond the "father of the Space Force". He retired from active duty on January 1, 2023, after 38 years of service.

== Civilian career ==
After retiring, Raymond joined the board of directors at Axiom Space while also serving as the company's strategic adviser on space domain safety and security matters. In May 2023, he joined an investment firm, Cerberus Capital Management, as a senior managing director on the company’s supply chain and strategic opportunities platform, providing strategic guidance on a portfolio of investments in technology, aerospace, and defense modernization areas. In February 2024, he joined the board of directors of Impulse Space, a space startup founded by Tom Mueller, a SpaceX founding member.

Raymond is also a distinguished visiting fellow at the Hoover Institution.

== Personal life ==
Raymond is married to Mollie Raymond from St. Paul, Minnesota, whom he met during his first assignment at Grand Forks Air Force Base, North Dakota and while she was studying at the University of North Dakota. They got married in June 1987 after Mollie graduated from college. They have three children.

== Awards and decorations ==
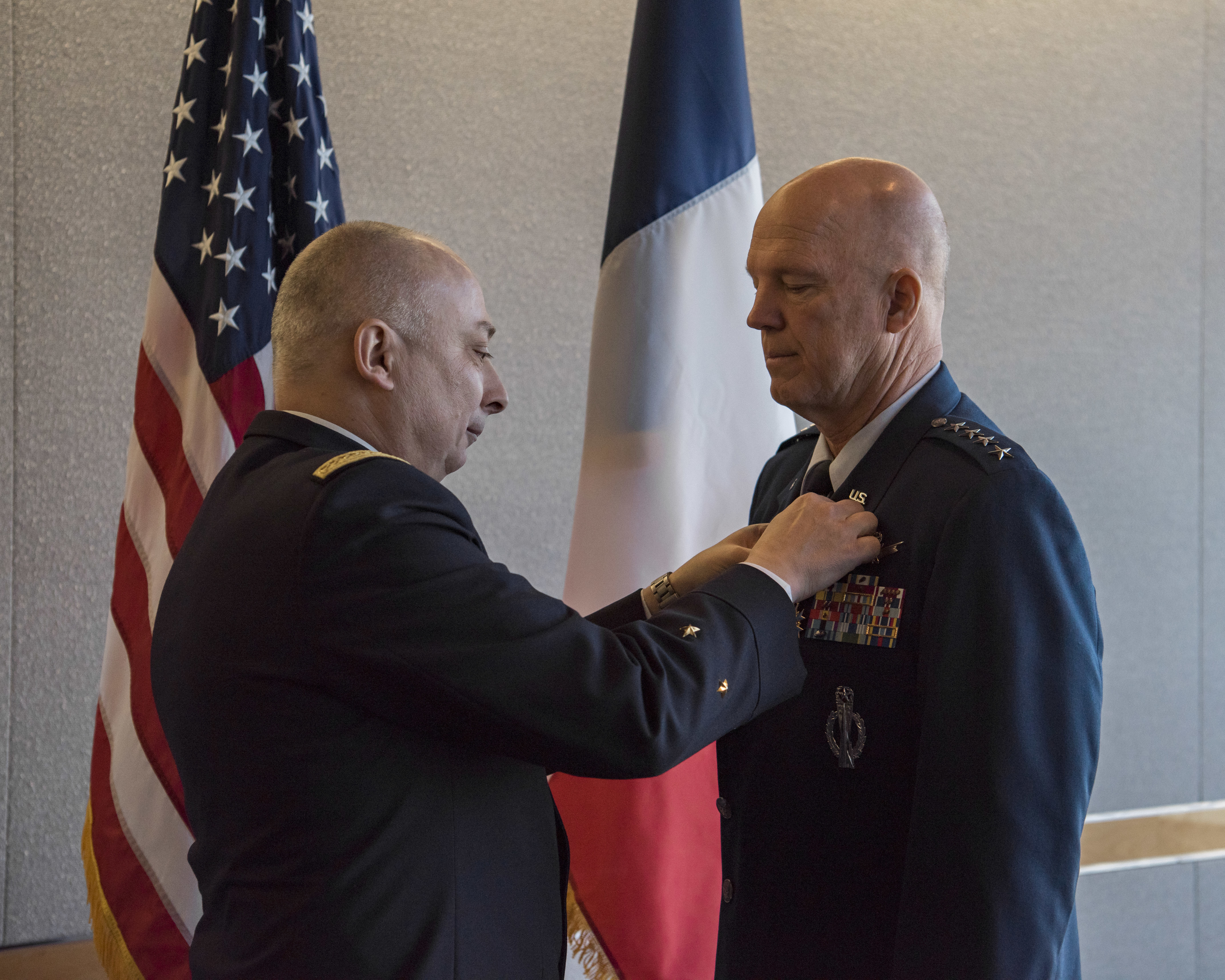
French Air Force Brigadier General Jean-Pascal Breton pins on the Ordre national du Mérite to Raymond, 2018

Raymond is the recipient of the following awards:

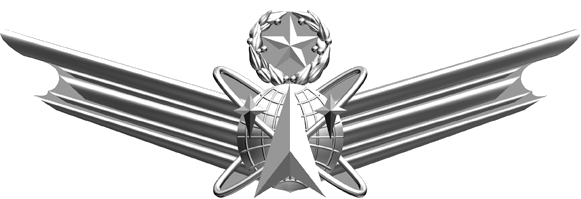
Command Space Operations Badge

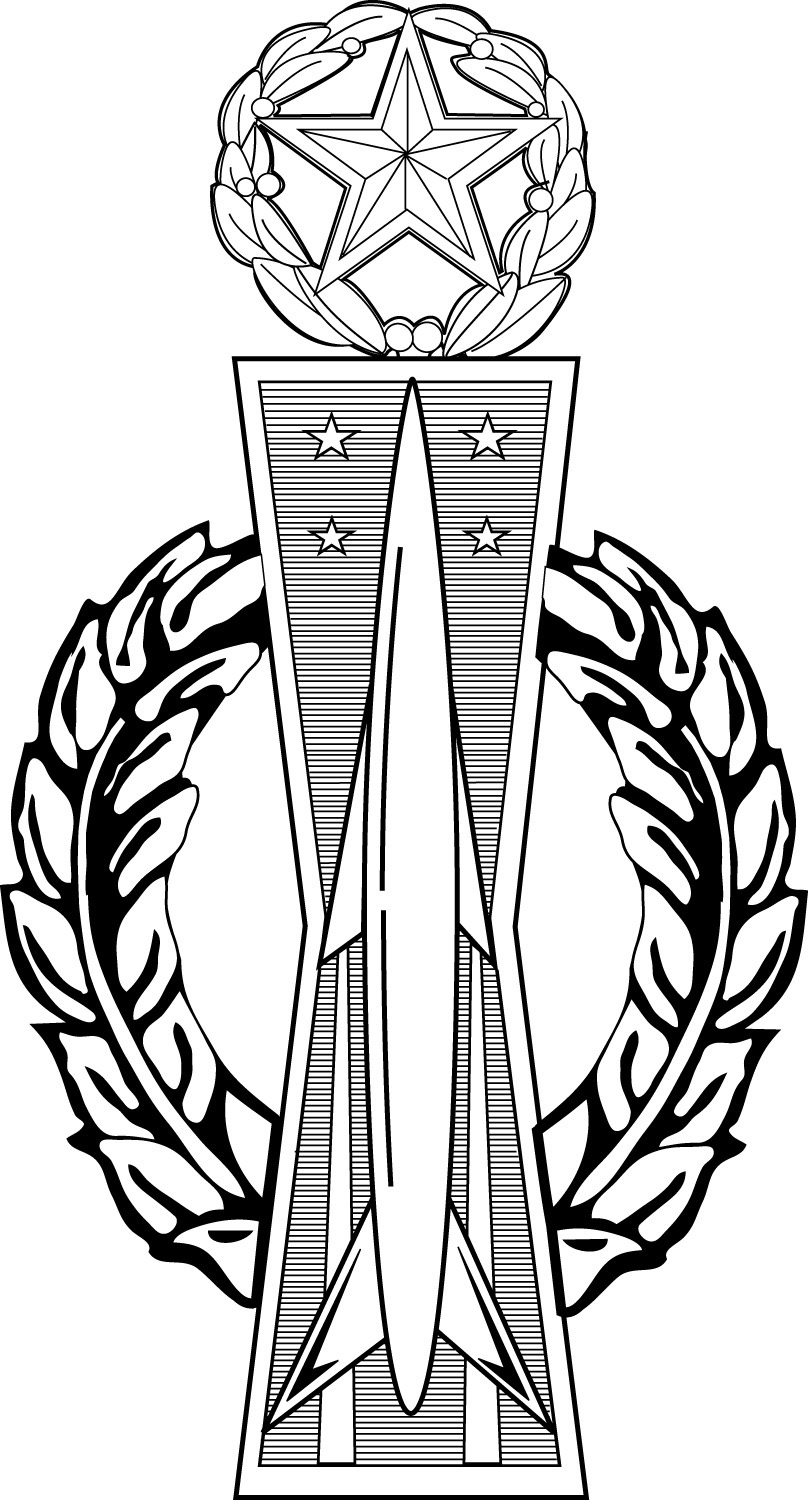

Command Missile Operations Badge

Office of the Joint Chiefs of Staff Identification Badge

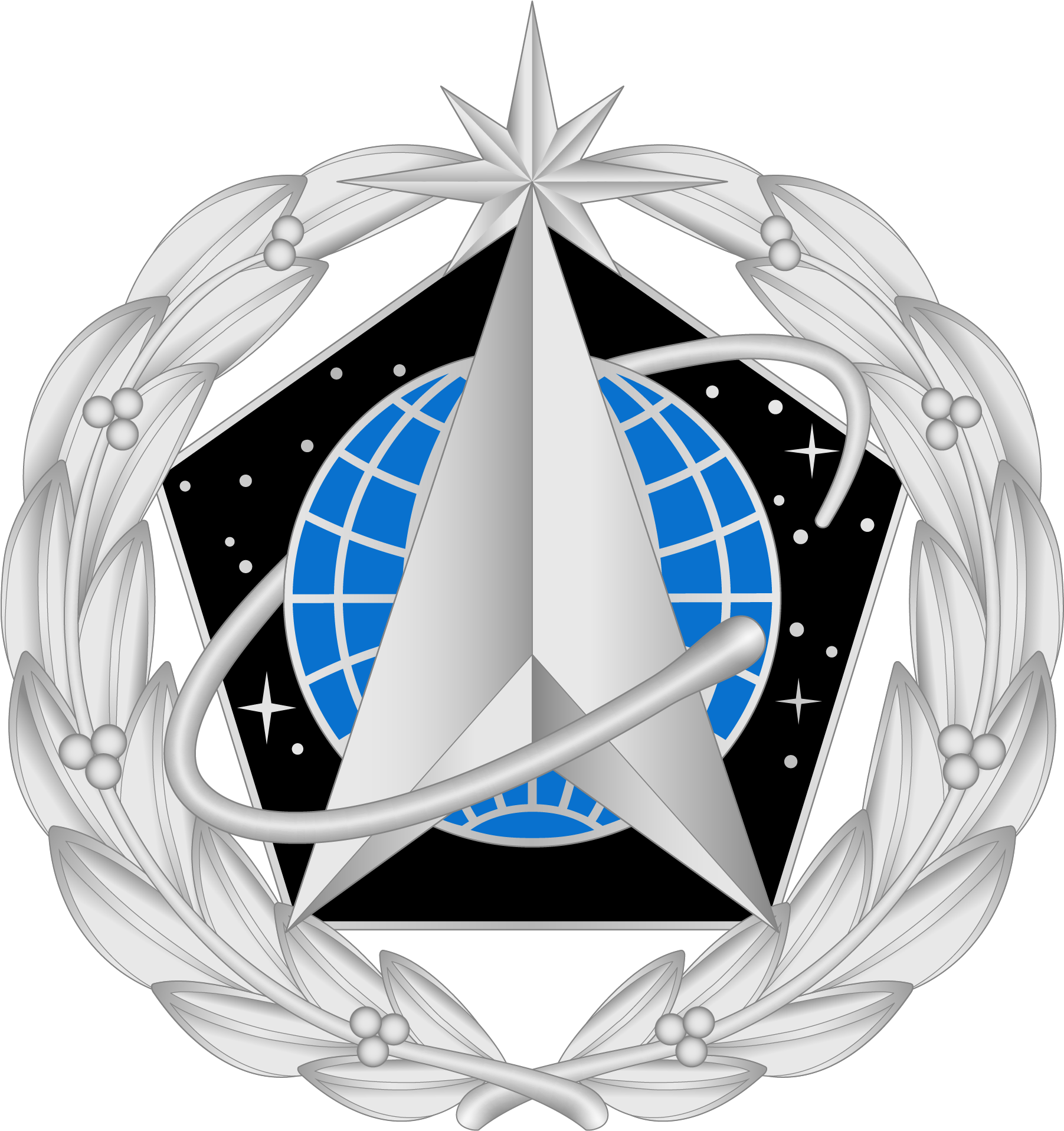

Space Staff Badge

Defense Distinguished Service Medal with one bronze oak leaf cluster
Air Force Distinguished Service Medal with one bronze oak leaf cluster
Defense Superior Service Medal with one bronze oak leaf cluster
Legion of Merit with one bronze oak leaf cluster
Meritorious Service Medal with four bronze oak leaf clusters
Air Force Commendation Medal
Joint Meritorious Unit Award
Air Force Outstanding Unit Award with two bronze oak leaf clusters
Air Force Organizational Excellence Award with two bronze oak leaf clusters
Combat Readiness Medal
Air Force Recognition Ribbon with one bronze oak leaf cluster
National Defense Service Medal with one bronze service star
Global War on Terrorism Expeditionary Medal
Global War on Terrorism Service Medal
Humanitarian Service Medal
Air Force Overseas Long Tour Service Ribbon
Air Force Expeditionary Service Ribbon with gold frame
Air Force Longevity Service Award with one silver and three bronze oak leaf clusters
Small Arms Expert Marksmanship Ribbon
Air Force Training Ribbon
National Order of Merit (France), Officer
Grand Cordon of the Order of the Rising Sun

- 2007 General Jerome F. O'Malley Distinguished Space Leadership Award, Air Force Association
- 2015 Thomas D. White Space Award, Air Force Association
- 2016 Peter B. Teets Government Award, National Defense Industrial Association
- 2017 James V. Hartinger Award, National Defense Industrial Association
- 2021 Henry “Hap” Arnold Award, Air Force Association

== Dates of promotion ==
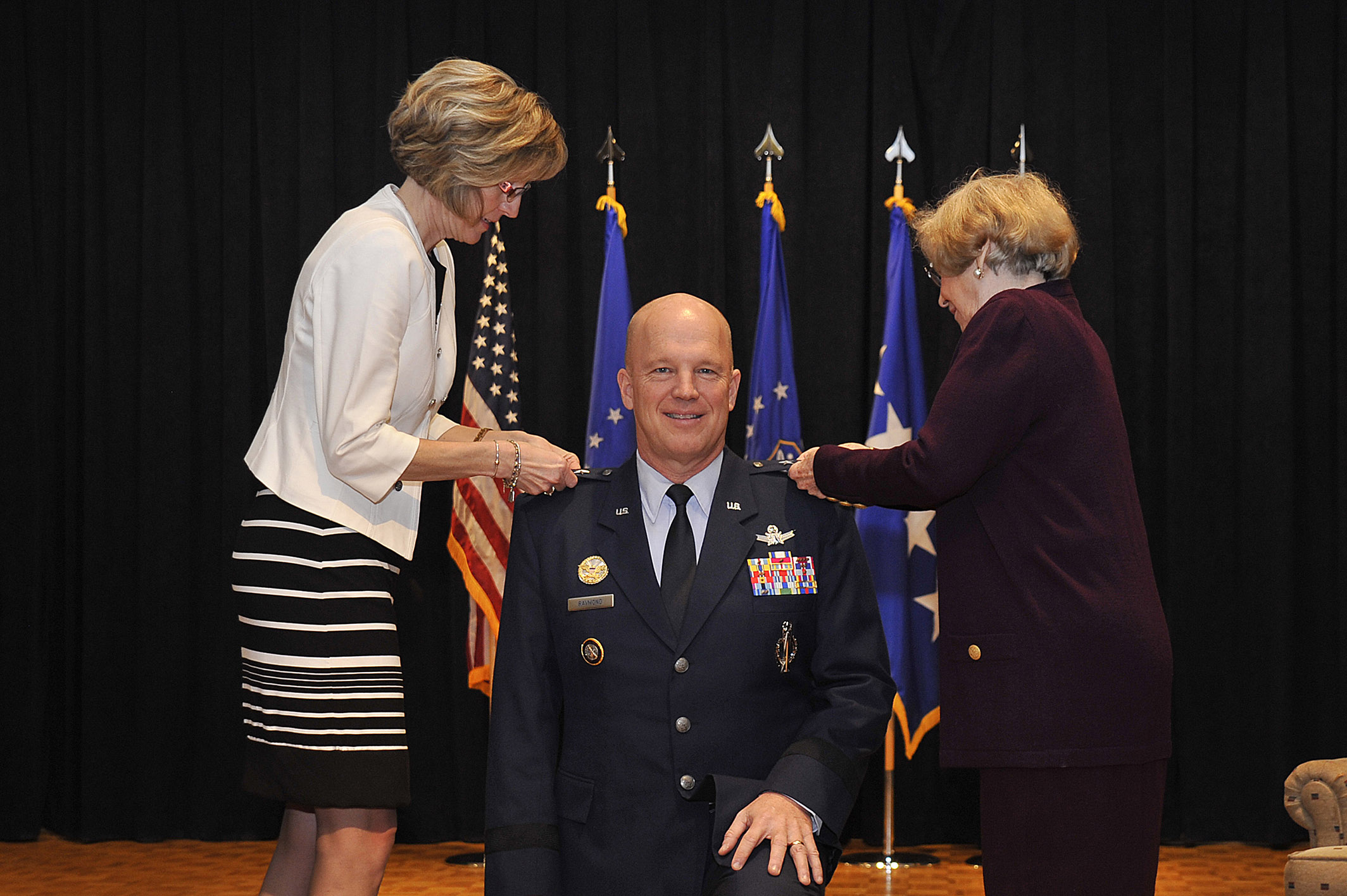
Raymond kneels as his wife, Mollie (left), and his mother, Barbara (right), pin on his third star during his promotion ceremony, January 31, 2014

Rank	Branch	Date
Second lieutenant	Air Force	July 20, 1984
First lieutenant	Air Force	July 20, 1986
Captain	Air Force	July 20, 1988
Major	Air Force	July 1, 1996
Lieutenant colonel	Air Force	July 1, 1999
Colonel	Air Force	July 1, 2004
Brigadier general	Air Force	August 19, 2009
Major general	Air Force	May 4, 2012
Lieutenant general	Air Force	January 31, 2014
General	Air Force	October 25, 2016
General	Space Force	December 20, 2019

== Writings ==
=== Op-eds ===
- With Frank Kendall III (June 8, 2022). "The U.S. Space Force Is Your Eye in the Sky". The Wall Street Journal.
- "How the U.S. Space Force is trying to bring order to increasingly messy outer space". The Washington Post. November 29, 2021.
- "How We're Building a 21st-Century Space Force". The Atlantic. December 20, 2020.
- With David L. Goldfein and Barbara Barrett (July 21, 2020). "US Air Force, Space Force: Here Is Your New Arctic Strategy". Defense One.
- "We Need to Focus on Space; We Don't Need a 'Space Corps'". Defense One. July 12, 2017.

=== Journal articles ===
- With Kurt M. Neuman (February 2011). "Preserving the Space Domain for Future Generations" (PDF). High Frontier: The Journal for Space & Missile Professionals. 7 (2): 20–23. Archived from the original (PDF) on November 17, 2016.
- With Troy Endicott (February 2008). "People Who Impact Warfare with Space Capabilities" (PDF). High Frontier: The Journal for Space & Missile Professionals. 4 (2): 23–28. Archived from the original (PDF) on November 17, 2016.
- "Transforming Space Capabilities" (PDF). High Frontier: The Journal for Space & Missile Professionals. 1 (4): 42–45. 2005. Archived from the original (PDF) on November 17, 2016.
- With Arthur K. Cebrowski (Summer 2005). "Operationally Responsive Space: A New Defense Business Model" (PDF). United States Army War College Quarterly. 35 (2): 66–77.

=== Thesis ===
- Offensive Counterspace: An Operational Fire (PDF) (M.A.). Naval War College. May 28, 2013.
- Airports and Spaceports A Historical Comparison (PDF) (M.S.). Air Command and Staff College. March 1, 1997.

Military offices
Preceded by Jay G. Santee	Commander of the 21st Space Wing; 2007–2009	Succeeded by Stephen N. Whiting
Preceded by Jack Weinstein	Director of Plans, Programs, and Analyses of the Air Force Space Command; 2009–2010	Succeeded by Samuel Greaves
Preceded by Salvatore A. Angelella	Vice Commander of the Fifth Air Force and Deputy Commander of the Thirteenth Air Force; 2010–2012	Succeeded by Jerry D. Harris
Preceded by Susan Y. Desjardins	Director of Plans and Policy of the United States Strategic Command; 2012–2014	Succeeded by David D. Thompson
Preceded by Susan Helms	Commander of the Fourteenth Air Force and the Joint Functional Component Command for Space; 2014–2015	Succeeded by David J. Buck
Preceded by Tod D. Wolters	Deputy Chief of Staff for Operations of the United States Air Force; 2015–2016	Succeeded by Mark Nowland
Preceded by David J. Buck as Commander of the Joint Functional Component Command for Space	Commander of the Joint Force Space Component Command; 2017–2019	Command inactivated
Preceded by John E. Hyten	Commander of the Air Force Space Command; 2016–2019	Command redesignated
New office	Commander of the United States Space Command; 2019–2020	Succeeded by James H. Dickinson
New office	Chief of Space Operations; 2019–2022	Succeeded by B. Chance Saltzman
