= David D. Thompson =

1st U.S. Space Force vice chief of space operations

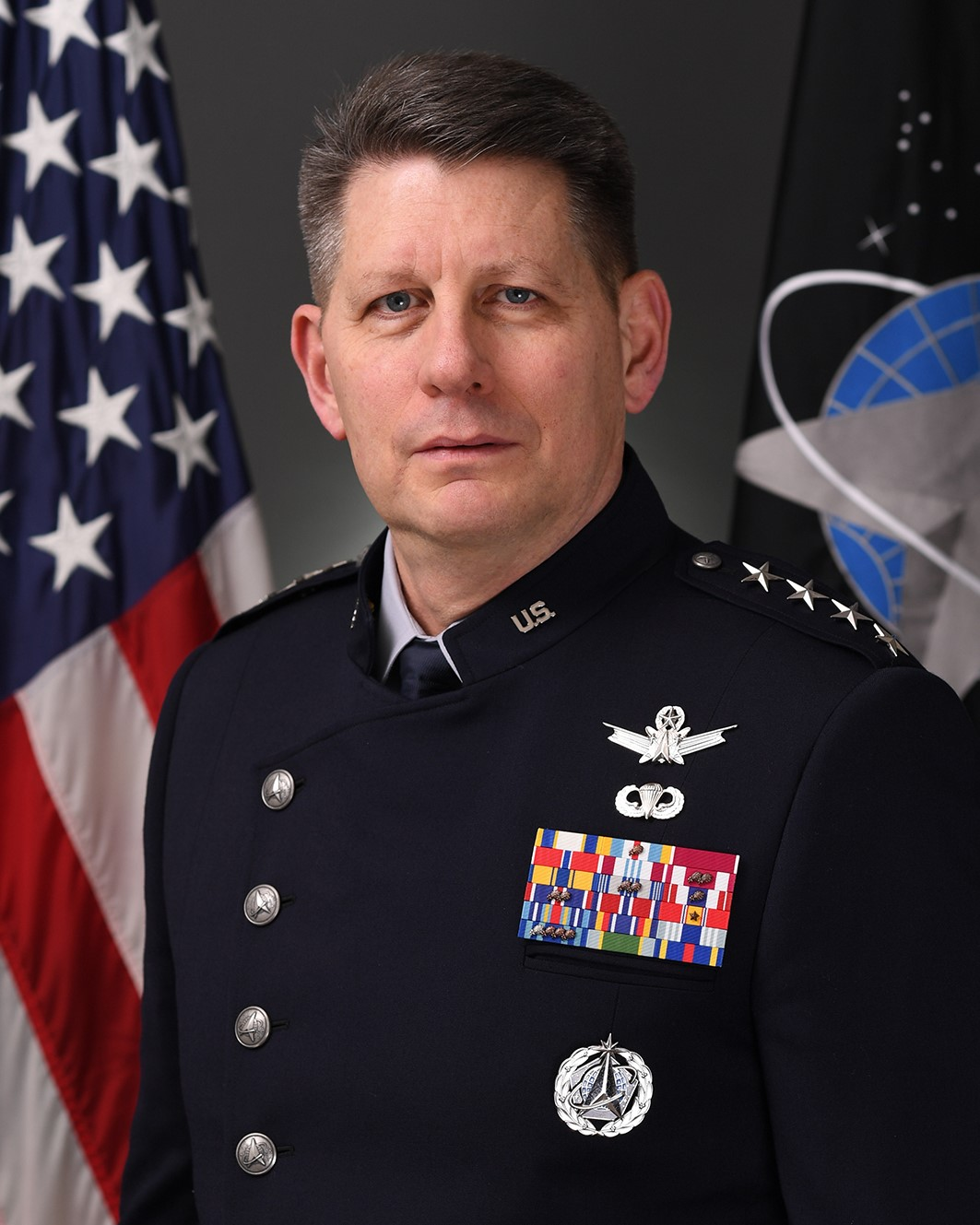
- Official portrait, 2023
- Born: February 18, 1963 (age 63); Ambridge, Pennsylvania, U.S.
- Education: United States Air Force Academy (BS): Purdue University (MS); Johannes Kepler University Linz
- Military career
- Allegiance: United States
- Branch: United States Air Force: United States Space Force
- Service years: 1985–2020 (Air Force): 2020–2023 (Space Force)
- Rank: General
- Nickname: DT
- Commands: Vice Chief of Space Operations: Aerospace Data Facility-Colorado; 45th Operations Group; 2nd Space Launch Squadron
- Awards: Air Force Distinguished Service Medal: Defense Superior Service Medal (2); Legion of Merit; Bronze Star Medal
- David D. Thompson's voice Thompson's opening statement at a House Armed Services Readiness Subcommittee hearing on military readiness Recorded July 19, 2022

David Dean Thompson (born May 12, 1963) is a retired United States Space Force general who served as the first vice chief of space operations from 2020 to 2023. He served as the vice commander of the Air Force Space Command from 2018 to 2020.

Born and raised in Ambridge, Pennsylvania, Thompson entered the United States Air Force in 1985 after graduating from the United States Air Force Academy. He studied at Purdue University and at Johannes Kepler University Linz as an Olmsted Scholar. A career space operations officer, he has commanded the 2nd Space Launch Squadron, 45th Operations Group, and Aerospace Data Facility-Colorado. He has served assignments in operations, acquisition, research and development, and academia.

In 2018, Thompson was assigned to Washington, D.C. to serve as the liaison of Air Force Space Command to the Pentagon and Congress during the creation of the Space Force. In October 2020, he transferred to the Space Force and assumed as the first vice chief of space operations. He was promoted to general, becoming the second general in the Space Force. He retired from the Space Force in 2023.

After retiring from the Space Force, Thompson joined the advisory board of HawkEye 360.

== Early life and education ==
Born and raised in Ambridge, Pennsylvania, David Dean Thompson was born on February 18, 1963. He graduated in Ambridge Area High School in 1981.

Thompson received a B.S. in astronautical engineering from the United States Air Force Academy in 1985. In 1989, he received an M.S. in aeronautics and astronautics from Purdue University in West Lafayette, Indiana. He is an Olmsted Scholar, studying at the Johannes Kepler University Linz in Austria. In 2005, he graduated from the Industrial College of the Armed Forces with an M.S. in national security industrial policy. He is also a graduate of the Senior Acquisition Course, a Level III-Certified Program Manager, and have attended the Defense Systems Management College, Air War College, and National Defense University as part of his professional military education.

== Military career ==
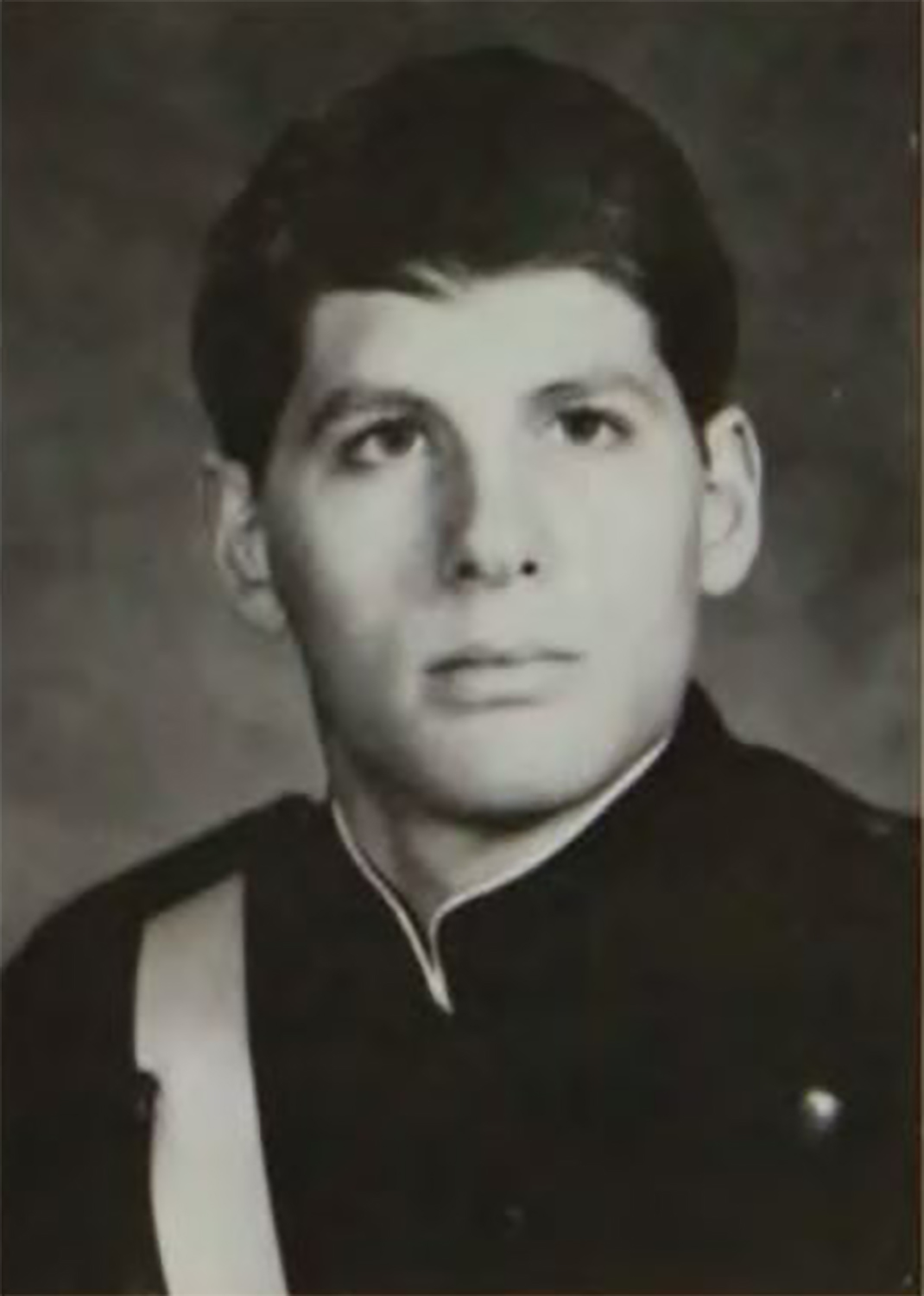
Thompson as a USAFA cadet

Thompson received his commission as a second lieutenant in the United States Air Force from the United States Air Force Academy (USAFA) on May 29, 1985.

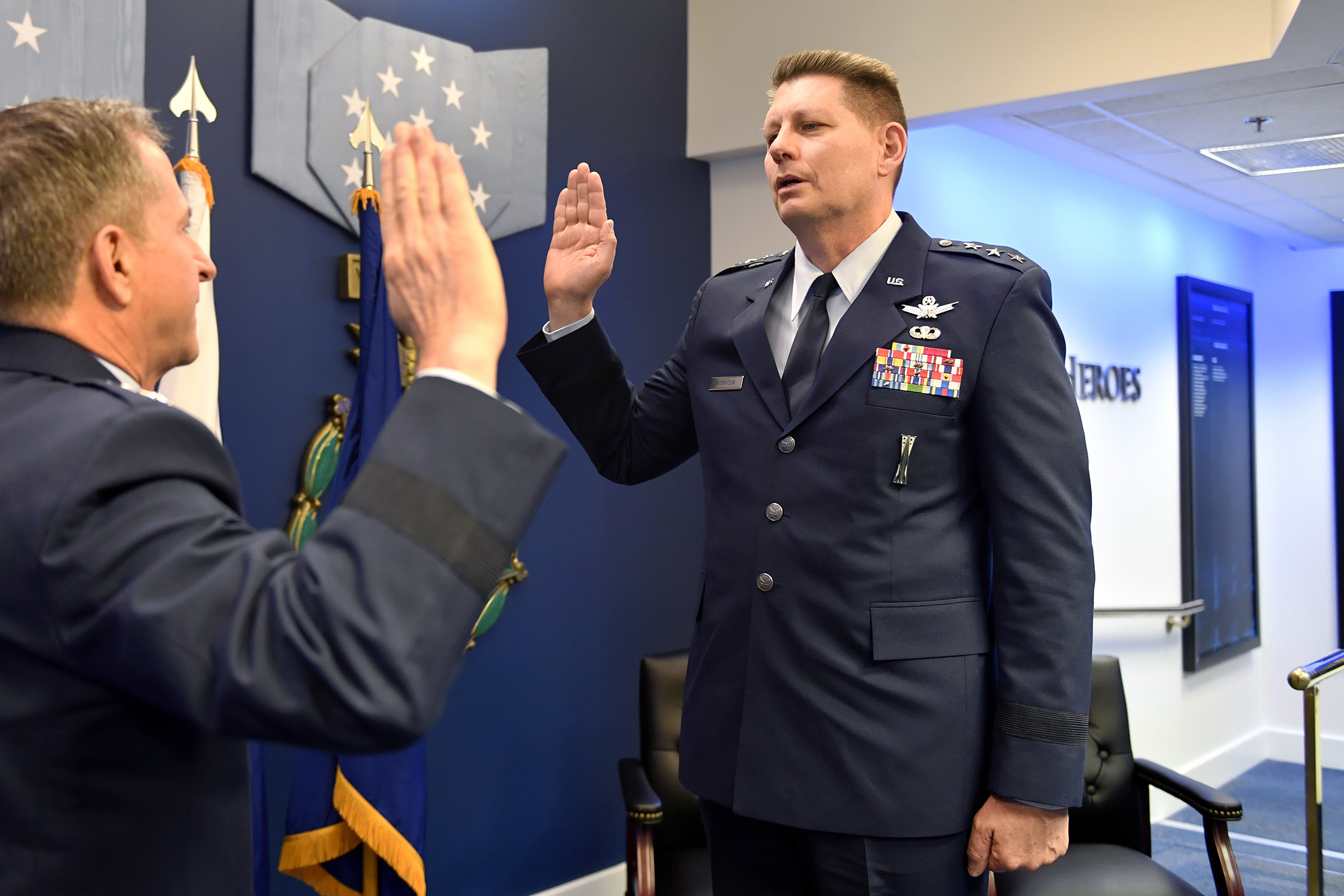
General Goldfein (left) promotes Thompson (right) to lieutenant general, 2018

From 1985 to 1988, Thompson was assigned at the Air Force Rocket Propulsion Laboratory at Edwards Air Force Base, California, as an experimental rocket propulsion engineer and chief of motor/component operations section. After that, he studied for a year at Purdue University. After receiving his graduate from Purdue, he went back to USAFA, now as an instructor of astronautics, assistant professor, and executive officer, for three years from 1989 to 1992. He continued his studies from 1992 to 1995 at the Presidio of Monterey, California and Johannes Kepler University Linz.

In 1995, Thompson returned to the United States, assigned at Space and Missile Systems Center as manager of the Advanced MILSATCOM Program for the MILSATCOM Joint Program Office until 1997. From 1998 to 2002, he was assigned to Air Force Space Command at Peterson Air Force Base, Colorado. He first served as a spacelift requirements officer and chief of the Spacelift Vehicle Requirements Branch of the major command's headquarters. After that, he served as served as deputy director of General Ralph Eberhart's commander's action group. From 2002 to 2004, he was stationed at Vandenberg Air Force Base, California, as operations officer and commander of the 2nd Space Launch Squadron.

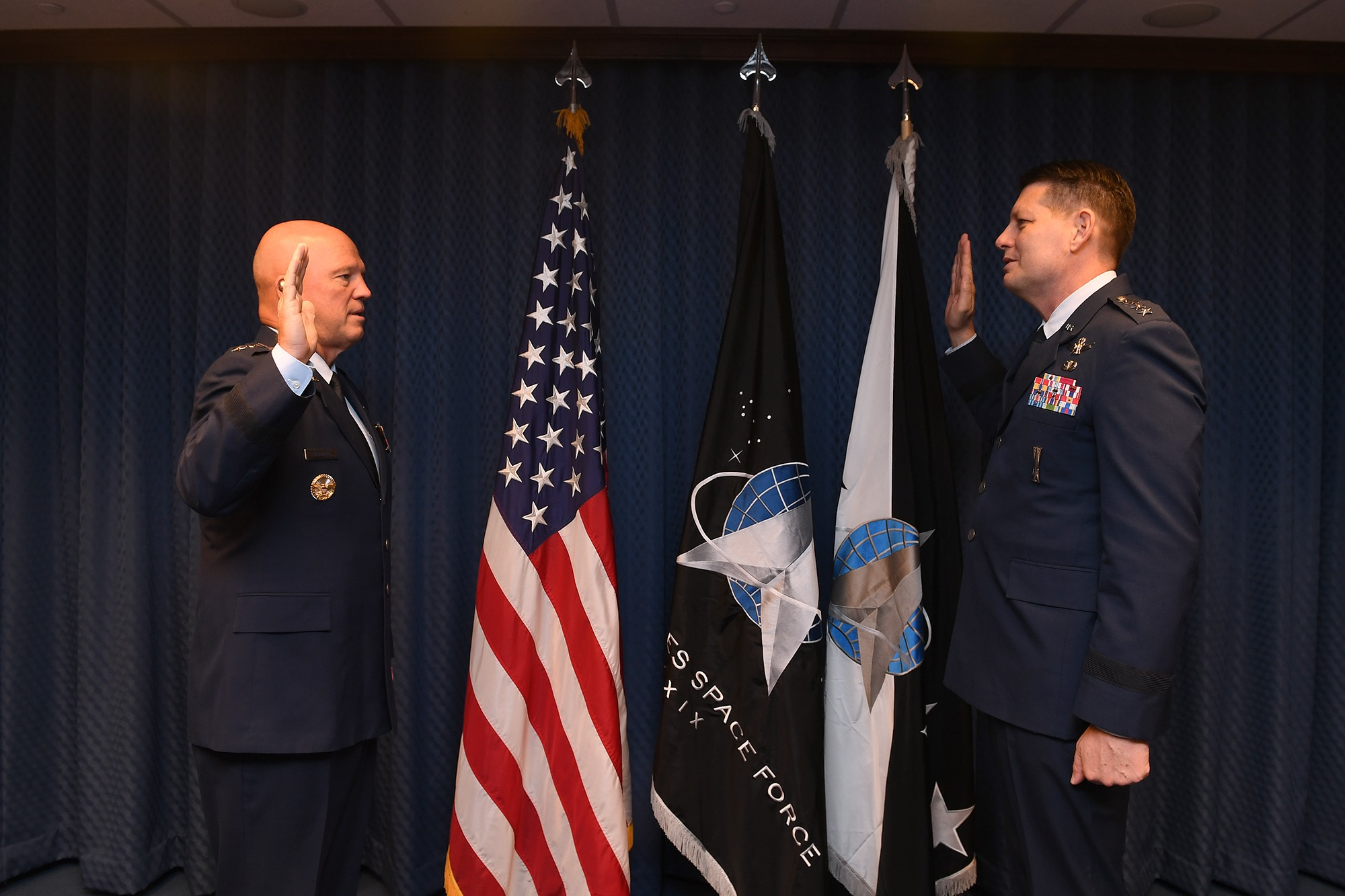
General Raymond promoting Thompson to general of the U.S. Space Force, 2020

In June 2005, Thompson took command of the 45th Operations Group (45 OG) at Patrick Air Force Base, Florida. After two years, he relinquished command of 45 OG and took command of Aerospace Data Facility-Colorado (ADF-C), at Buckley Air Force Base, Colorado. He was commander of ADF-C from 2007 to 2009, after which he deployed to Southwest Asia as director of space forces at the United States Air Forces Central Command for a year.

After his deployment, Thompson was promoted to brigadier general and served as vice commander of the Air Force Warfare Center at Nellis Air Force Base, Nevada. He then went back to AFSPC from 2011 to 2012 as director of air, space, and cyberspace operations. From 2012 to 2015, he was assigned at the United States Strategic Command at Offut Air Force Base, Nebraska, first as the deputy director for global operations and then as director of plans and policy.

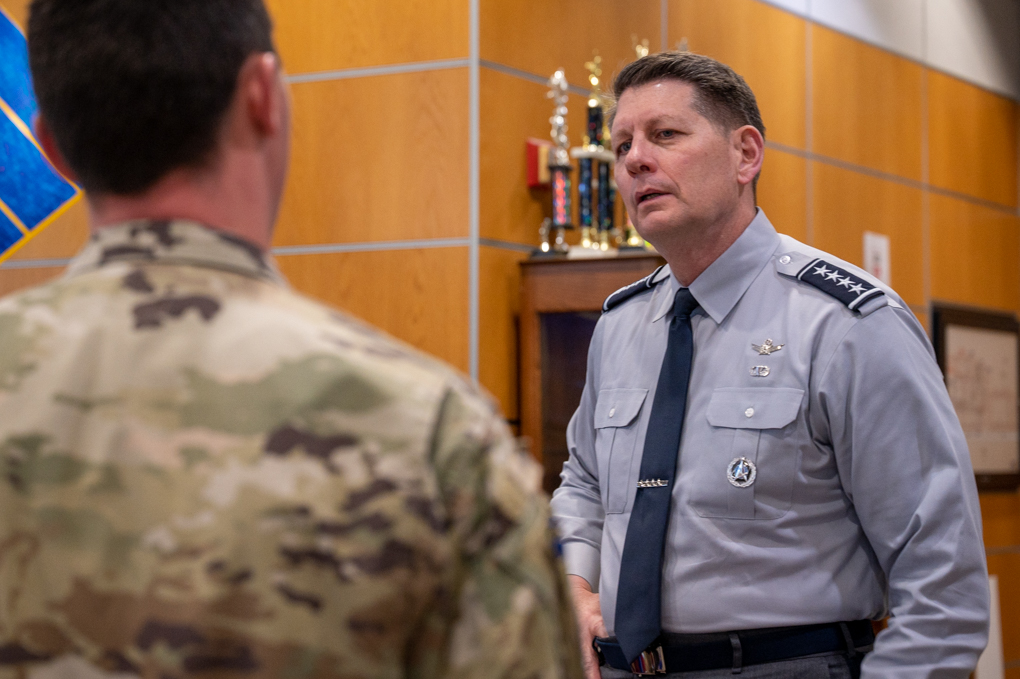
Thompson receives a briefing at Buckley Space Force Base, 2023

From July 2015 to July 2017, he served as the Air Force Space Command's then-two-star vice commander. That position was then renamed as AFSPC deputy commander in 2017 with Thompson serving as the special assistant to the AFSPC commander. In 2018, the AFSPC planned to revive the vice commander position, turning it into a position for a three-star general after Congress nixed plans on creating a deputy chief of staff for space operations position. On April 4, 2018, he then resumed his previous position as AFSPC vice commander, promoted to lieutenant general.

With the redesignation of the AFSPC as the newly created United States Space Force on December 20, 2019, Thompson retained his position as vice commander of the Space Force. In August 2020, he was nominated for transfer to the Space Force at the permanent rank of major general and concurrently he was also nominated for appointment to the rank of general and assignment as the first vice chief of space operations. He was confirmed by the Senate on September 30, 2020, and assumed rank following day. Thompson assumed office on October 2.

In October 2020, Thompson tested positive for COVID-19 after a family member who he was in contact with tested positive. He was asymptomatic and returned to work on November 9, 2020, after an 11-day quarantine.

Thompson retired from the Space Force on December 14, 2023.

== Civilian career ==
In March 2024, HawkEye 360 announced that Thompson was selected as a member of their advisory board. "I was drawn to HawkEye 360 by the vision and passion of the company leadership to serve the security needs of the nation and its Armed Forces," Thompson wrote.

== Awards and decorations ==
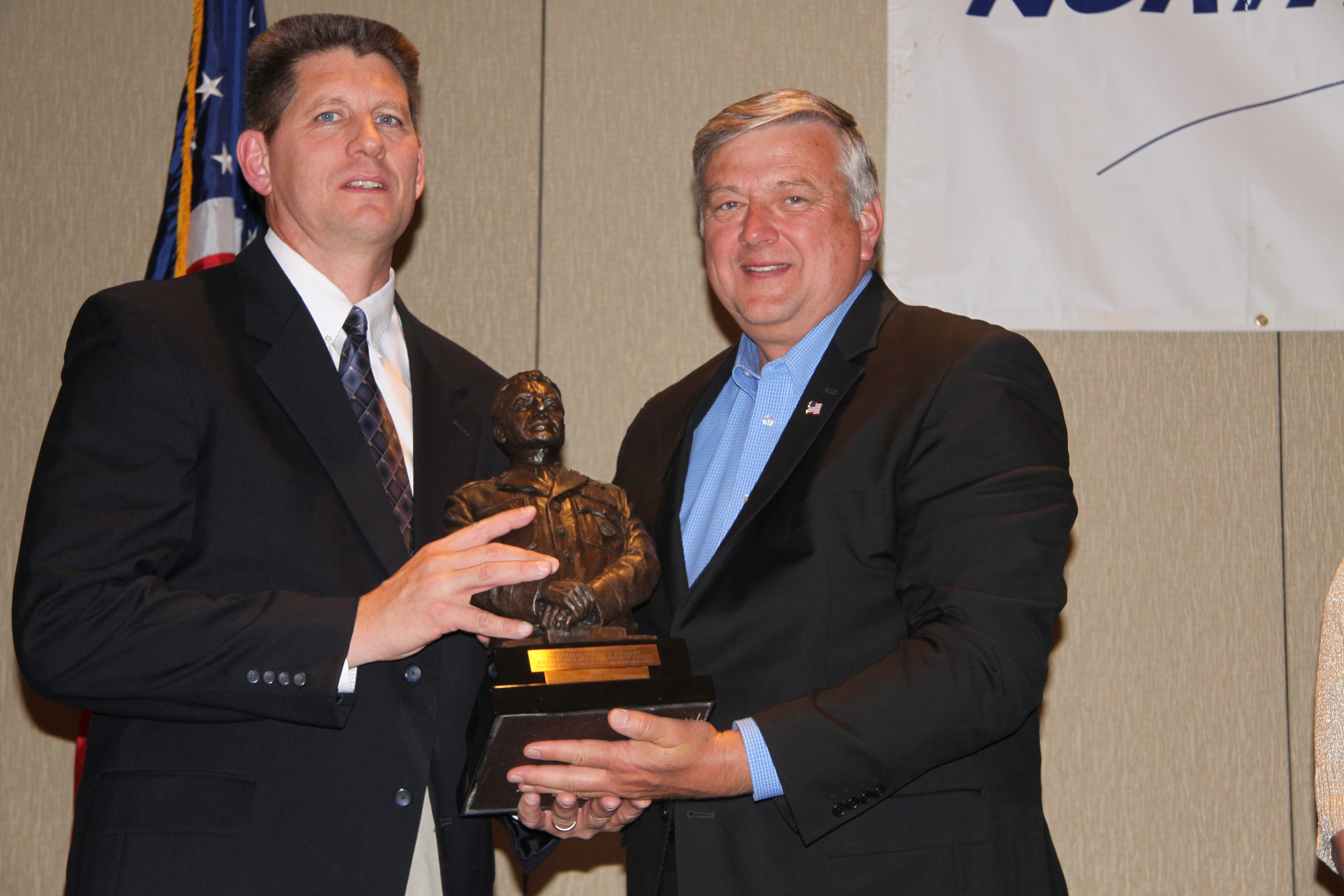
Thompson (left) receives the Air Force Association's Jerome F. O'Malley Distinguished Space Leadership Award, 2011

Thompson is the recipient of the following awards and decorations:

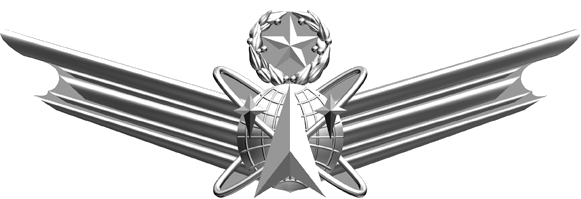
Command Space Operations Badge

Basic Parachutist Badge

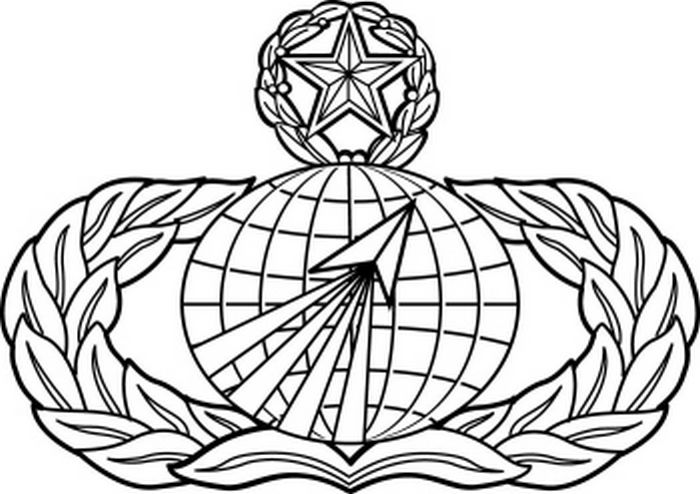

Air Force Master Acquisition and Financial Management Badge

Basic Missile Maintenance Badge

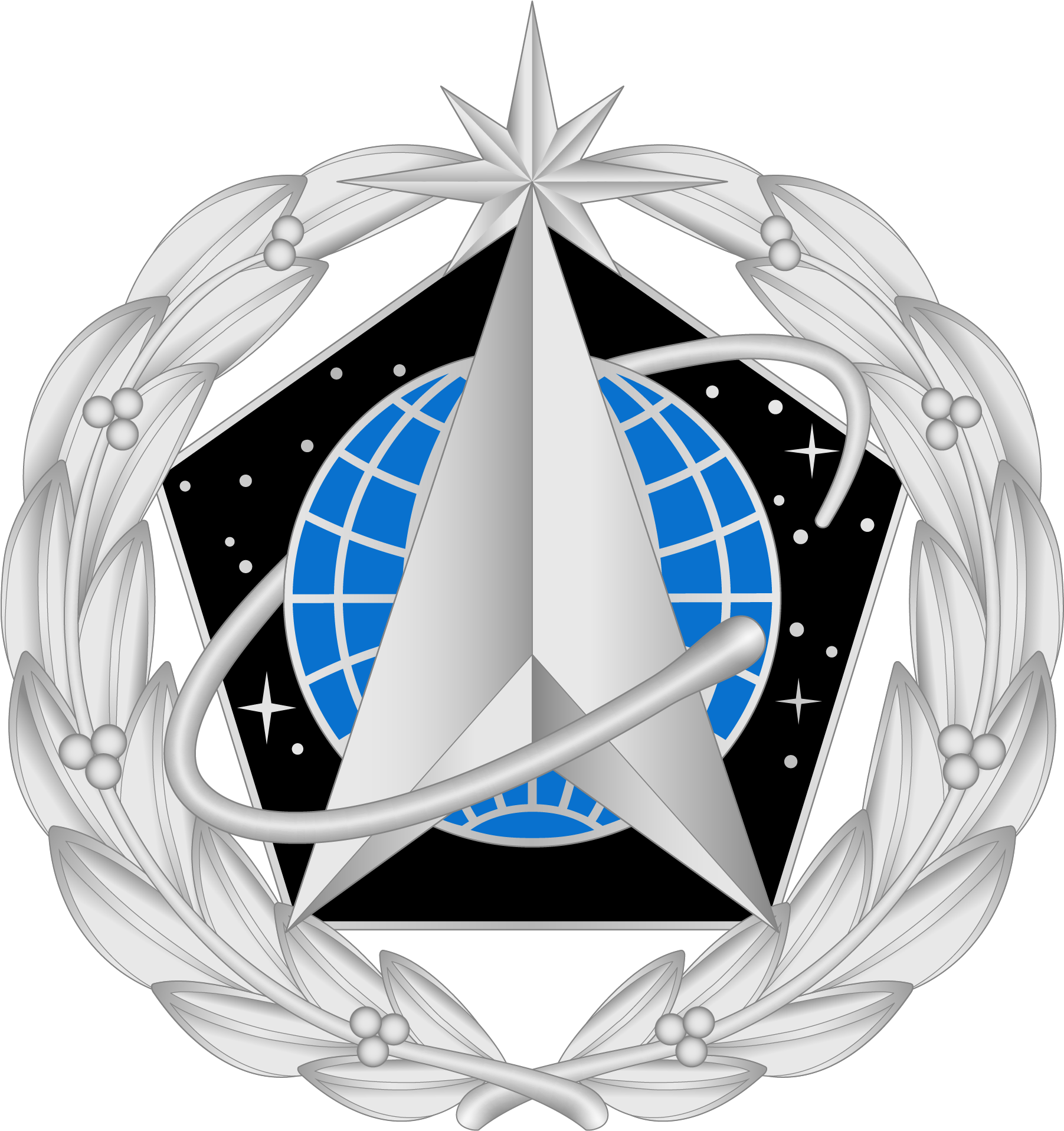

Space Staff Badge

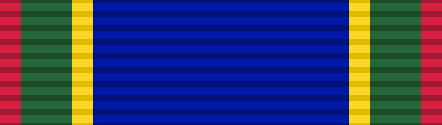
Air Force Distinguished Service Medal
Defense Superior Service Medal with one bronze oak leaf cluster
Legion of Merit
Bronze Star Medal
Defense Meritorious Service Medal
Meritorious Service Medal with two bronze oak leaf clusters
Air Force Commendation Medal
Air Force Achievement Medal with two bronze oak leaf clusters
Air Force Meritorious Unit Award with one bronze oak leaf cluster
Air Force Outstanding Unit Award with two bronze oak leaf clusters
Air Force Organizational Excellence Award
National Reconnaissance Office Distinguished Service Medal (gold medal)
National Defense Service Medal with one bronze service star
Global War on Terrorism Expeditionary Medal
Global War on Terrorism Service Medal
Air Force Overseas Long Tour Service Ribbon
Air Force Longevity Service Award with one silver and three bronze oak leaf clusters
Small Arms Expert Marksmanship Ribbon
Air Force Training Ribbon

== Dates of promotion ==
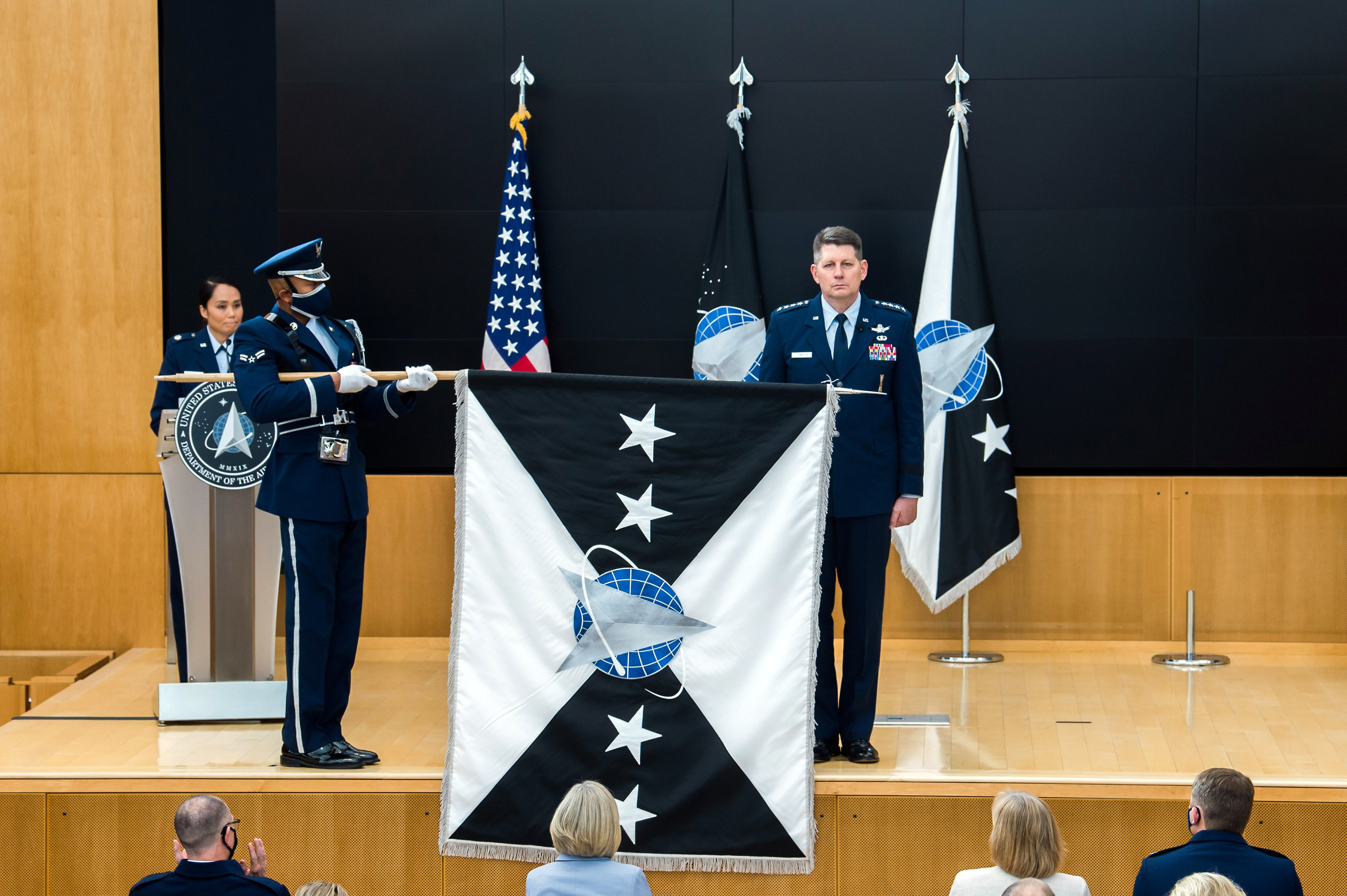
An airman unfurls Thompson's positional color, the first for a VCSO, during his promotion ceremony to general, 2020

Rank	Branch	Date
Second lieutenant	Air Force	May 29, 1985
First lieutenant	Air Force	May 29, 1987
Captain	Air Force	May 29, 1989
Major	Air Force	August 1, 1996
Lieutenant colonel	Air Force	May 1, 2000
Colonel	Air Force	August 1, 2004
Brigadier general	Air Force	June 18, 2010
Major general	Air Force	October 10, 2013
Lieutenant general	Air Force	April 4, 2018
General	Space Force	October 1, 2020

== Writings ==
- "Space Force is needed to provide for and protect America's use of space". The Hill. September 19, 2023.
- With Gregory Gagnon and Christopher W. McLeod (Summer 2018). "Space as a War-fighting Domain" (PDF). Air and Space Power Journal. 32 (2): 4–8.
- The Need for a Dedicated Space Vehicle for Defensive Counterspace Operations (PDF) (M.S.). Air Command and Staff College. April 1998. Archived (PDF) from the original on August 12, 2021.

Military offices
Preceded by Cary C. Chun	Commander of the Aerospace Data Facility-Colorado; 2007–2009	Succeeded by Stephen T. Denker
Preceded by James K. McLaughlin	Vice Commander of the Air Force Warfare Center; 2010–2011	Succeeded by David J. Buck
Preceded by Tod D. Wolters	Director of Air, Space and Cyberspace Operations of the Air Force Space Command; 2011–2012	Succeeded by Jack Weinstein
Preceded by James K. McLaughlin	Deputy Director for Global Operations of the United States Strategic Command; 2012–2014	Succeeded by Clinton Crosier
Preceded by John W. Raymond	Director for Plans and Policy of the United States Strategic Command; 2014–2015	Succeeded by Clinton Crosier
Preceded by David J. Buck	Vice Commander of the Air Force Space Command; 2015–2017	Succeeded by Robert J. Skinner
Preceded by Bruce H. McClintock	Special Assistant to the Commander of the Air Force Space Command; 2017–2018	Position abolished
New office	Vice Commander of the Air Force Space Command, later United States Space Force; 2018–2020	Position renamed
New office	Vice Chief of Space Operations; 2020–2023	Succeeded by Michael Guetlein
