= List of United States Space Force lieutenant generals =

Flag of a Space Force lieutenant general

The rank of lieutenant general (or three-star general) is the second-highest rank achievable in the United States Space Force, and the first to have a specific number of authorized positions for it set by statute. It ranks above major general (two-star general) and below general (four-star general).

There have been 14 lieutenant generals in the U.S. Space Force, four of whom were promoted to four-star general. All achieved that rank while on active duty in the U.S. Space Force, and all were commissioned via identical paths to Air Force commissioned officers: 10 via Air Force Reserve Officer Training Corps (AFROTC) at a civilian university, three via the U.S. Air Force Academy (USAFA), and one via the Academy of Military Science (AMS).

== List of generals ==
Entries in the following list of lieutenant generals are indexed by the numerical order in which each officer was promoted to that rank while on active duty, or by an asterisk (*) if the officer did not serve in that rank while on active duty in the U.S. Space Force or was promoted to four-star rank while on active duty in the U.S. Space Force. Each entry lists the general's name, date of rank, (Note: Dates of rank are taken, where available, from the officer's official Space Force biography. The date listed is that of the officer's first promotion to lieutenant general. If such a date cannot be found, the next date substituted should be that of the officer's assumption of his/her first three-star appointment. Failing which, the officer's first Senate confirmation date to lieutenant general should be substituted.) active-duty positions held while serving at three-star rank, (Note: Positions listed are those held by the officer when promoted to lieutenant general. Dates listed are for the officer's full tenure, which may predate promotion to three-star rank or postdate retirement from active duty.) number of years of active-duty service at three-star rank (Yrs), (Note: The number of years of active-duty service at three-star rank is approximated by subtracting the year in the "Date of rank" column from the last year in the "Position" column. Time spent between active-duty three-star assignments is not counted.) year commissioned and source of commission, (Note: Sources of commission are listed in parentheses after the year of commission and include: the United States Air Force Academy (USAFA); Air Force Reserve Officer Training Corps (AFROTC) at a civilian university; AFROTC at a senior military college such as Texas A&M University (Texas A&M), the Virginia Military Institute (VMI), or Virginia Polytechnic Institute and State University (VPI); Air Force Officer Training School (OTS); and direct commission (direct).) number of years in commission when promoted to three-star rank (YC), (Note: The number of years in commission before being promoted to three-star rank is approximated by subtracting the year in the "Commission" column from the year in the "Date of rank" column.) and other biographical notes (years of birth and death are shown in parentheses in the Notes column). (Note: Notes include years of birth and death; awards of the Medal of Honor, Congressional Gold Medal, Presidential Medal of Freedom, or honors of similar significance; major government appointments; university presidencies or equivalents; familial relationships with other significant military officers or significant government officials such as U.S. Presidents, cabinet secretaries, U.S. Senators, or state governors; and unusual career events such as premature relief or death in office.) Lieutenant generals of the U.S. Air Force who transferred to the Space Force in the equivalent grade or promoted to grade after transfer to the Space Force are included.

List of U.S. Space Force lieutenant generals
#	Name	Photo	Date of rank	Position	Yrs	Commission	YC	Notes
*	B. Chance Saltzman		7 Aug 2020	Deputy Chief of Space Operations, Operations, Cyber, and Nuclear (DCSO S3/4/6/7/10), 2020–2022.	2	1991 (AFROTC)	29	(1969– ) (Note: Served as Chief of Space Operations.) Promoted to general, 2 Nov 2022. First lieutenant general in the Space Force and first general officer commissioned into the service.
1	Nina M. Armagno		7 Aug 2020	Director of Staff, U.S. Space Force (SF/DS), 2020–2023.	3	1988 (USAFA)	32	(1966– ) First female general officer in the Space Force.
2	William J. Liquori Jr.		7 Aug 2020	Deputy Chief of Space Operations, Strategy, Plans, Programs, Requirements, and Analysis (DCSO S5/8/9), 2020–2022.	2	1991 (AFROTC)	29	(1969– )
*	Stephen N. Whiting		21 Oct 2020	Commander, Space Operations Command (COMSpOC), 2020–2024.	4	1989 (USAFA)	31	(1967– ) (Note: Served as a combatant commander (CCDR).) Promoted to general, 10 Jan 2024.
3	John E. Shaw		23 Nov 2020	Deputy Commander, U.S. Space Command (DCDRUSSPACECOM), 2020–2023.	3	1990 (USAFA)	30	(1968– ) First Space Force lieutenant general with a joint duty assignment.
*	Michael A. Guetlein		13 Aug 2021	Commander, Space Systems Command (COMSSC), 2021–2023.	2	1991 (AFROTC)	30	(1967– ) (Note: Served as Vice Chief of Space Operations (VCSO).) Promoted to general, 21 Dec 2023.
4	Philip A. Garrant		2 Aug 2022	Deputy Chief of Space Operations, Strategy, Plans, Programs, Requirements, and Analysis (DCSO S5/8), 2022–2023.; Acting Vice Chief of Space Operations (VCSO), 2023.; Commander, Space Systems Command (COMSSC), 2024–present.	4	1991 (AFROTC)	31	(1969– )
5	DeAnna M. Burt		1 Dec 2022	Deputy Chief of Space Operations, Operations, Cyber, and Nuclear (DCSO S3/4/6/7/10), 2022–2025.; Acting Vice Chief of Space Operations (VCSO), 2025.	3	1991 (AFROTC)	31	(1969– )
*	Douglas A. Schiess		6 Dec 2023	Commander, U.S. Space Forces – Space (COMS4S)/Combined Joint Force Space Component Commander, U.S. Space Command, 2023–2025.; Deputy Chief of Space Operations, Operations (DCSO S3/4/7), 2025–2026.	3	1992 (AFROTC)	31	(1970– ) Promoted to general, 3 Sep 2023.
*	Shawn N. Bratton		22 Dec 2023	Deputy Chief of Space Operations, Strategy, Plans, Programs, and Requirements (DCSO S5/8), 2023–2025.	2	1994 (AMS)	29	(1968– ) Promoted to general, 1 Aug 2025. Served seven years in the enlisted ranks before receiving his commission in 1994.
6	David N. Miller Jr.		9 Jan 2024	Commander, Space Operations Command (COMSpOC), 2024–2025.; Deputy Chief of Space Operations, Strategy, Plans, Programs, and Requirements (DCSO S5/8), 2025–present.	2	1993 (AFROTC)	31	(c. 1971– )
7	Steven P. Whitney		30 Oct 2025	Director, Force Structure, Resources, and Assessment, Joint Staff (JCS/J8), 2025–present.	1	1993 (AFROTC)	31	(c. 1971– )
8	Gregory Gagnon		3 Nov 2025	Commander, U.S. Space Force Combat Forces Command (COMCFC), 2025–present.	1	1994 (AFROTC)	31	(c. 1972– )
9	Dennis Bythewood		4 November 2025	Commander, U.S. Space Forces – Space (COMS4S)/Combined Joint Force Space Component Commander, U.S. Space Command, 2025–present.	1	1992 (AFROTC)	33	(c. 1970– )

== Timeline ==
=== Overview ===
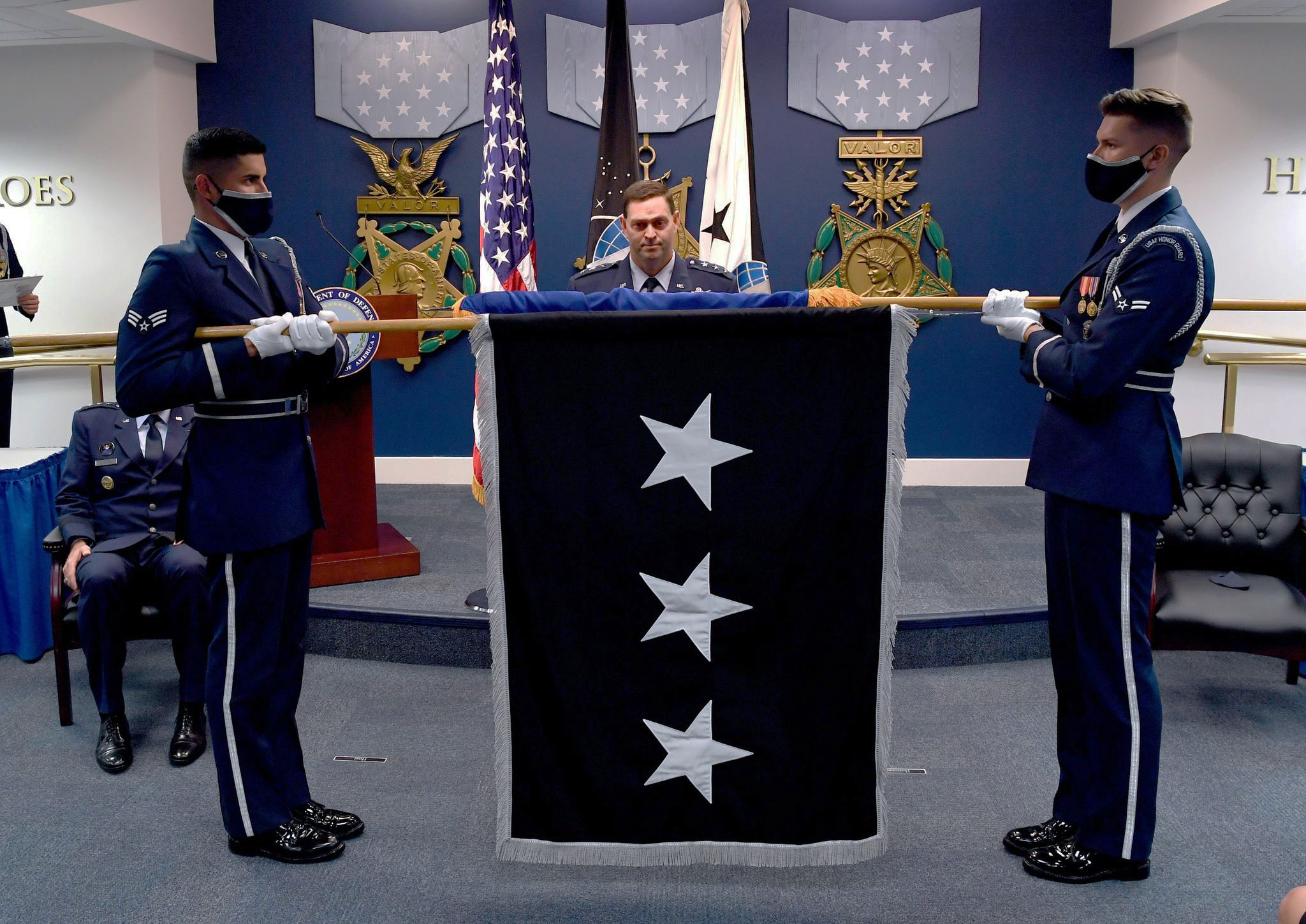
Maj. Gen. B. Chance Saltzman is presented his three-star flag during his promotion ceremony at the Pentagon on 14 August 2020.

The rank of lieutenant general in the United States Space Force is identical to its equivalents in the Army, Marine Corps and Air Force in that it is strictly ex officio, tied to positions requiring the officeholder to hold said rank. As a result, upon vacating such a position, the officeholder is reduced to their highest permanent grade, but may retain their temporary grade outside of statutory limits for up to 60 days pending reassignment to a position of equal or higher importance.

The first three-star general in the Space Force was B. Chance Saltzman, who was promoted on 14 August 2020 with date of rank on 7 August.

Both initial general officer setups for the Space Force provided for six lieutenant generals in the new service. In December 2022, the James M. Inhofe National Defense Authorization Act for Fiscal Year 2023 codified seven lieutenant general billets for the Space Force into Title 10 of the United States Code.

== See also ==
- Lieutenant general (United States)
- General officers in the United States
- List of active duty United States four-star officers
- List of active duty United States three-star officers
- List of active duty United States Space Force general officers
- List of United States Space Force four-star generals
- List of United States Army lieutenant generals since 2020
- List of United States Marine Corps lieutenant generals since 2010
- List of United States Navy vice admirals since 2020
- List of United States Air Force lieutenant generals since 2020
- List of United States military leaders by rank
- Staff (military)
