= List of United States Space Force four-star generals =

Flag of a Space Force four-star general

The rank of general (or full general, or four-star general), ranks above lieutenant general (three-star general) and is the highest rank achievable in the United States Space Force.

There have been seven four-star generals in the history of the U.S. Space Force. All achieved that rank while on active duty. Generals entered the Space Force via several paths: Four were commissioned via the Air Force Reserve Officer Training Corps (AFROTC), two via the U.S. Air Force Academy (USAFA), and one via the Academy of Military Science (AMS).

== List of generals ==
The following lists of four-star generals are sortable by last name, date of rank. The date listed is that of the officer's first promotion to general, and may differ from the officer's entry in the U.S. Space Force register. The year commissioned is taken to be the year the officer was commissioned which may precede the officer's actual date of commission by up to two years. Each entry lists the general's name, date of rank, active-duty position held while serving at four-star rank, number of years of active-duty service at four-star rank (Yrs), year commissioned and source of commission, number of years in commission when promoted to four-star rank (YC), and other biographical notes.

No.	Name	Photo	Date of rank	Position(s)	Yrs.	Commission	YC.	Notes
1	John W. Raymond		25 Oct 2016	Commander, Air Force Space Command (COMAFSPC), 2016–2017.; Commander, Air Force Space Command/Joint Force Space Component Commander (COMAFSPC/JFSCC), 2017–2019.; Commander, U.S. Space Command/Commander, Air Force Space Command (CDRUSSPACECOM/COMAFSPC), 2019.; Chief of Space Operations/Commander, U.S. Space Command (CSO/CDRUSSPACECOM), 2019–2020.; Chief of Space Operations (CSO), 2020–2022.	6	1984 (AFROTC)	32	(born 1962)
2	David D. Thompson		1 Oct 2020	Vice Chief of Space Operations (VCSO), 2020–2023.	3	1985 (USAFA)	35	(born 1963)
3	B. Chance Saltzman		2 Nov 2022	Chief of Space Operations (CSO), 2022–2026.	4	1991 (AFROTC)	31	(born 1969)
4	Michael A. Guetlein		21 Dec 2023	Vice Chief of Space Operations (VCSO), 2023–2025.; Direct Reporting Program Manager for Golden Dome for America (GDA DRPM), 2025–present.	3	1991 (AFROTC)	31	(born 1967)
5	Stephen N. Whiting		10 Jan 2024	Commander, U.S. Space Command (CDRUSSPACECOM), 2024–present.	2	1989 (USAFA)	35	(born 1967)
6	Shawn N. Bratton		1 Aug 2025	Vice Chief of Space Operations (VCSO), 2025–present.	1	1994 (AMS)	31	(born 1968)
7	Douglas A. Schiess		3 Sep 2026	Chief of Space Operations (CSO), 2026–present.	0	1992 (AFROTC)	34	(born 1970)

== History ==
=== 2019–present ===
The modern rank of general was established by the Officer Personnel Act of 1947, which authorized the President to designate certain positions of importance to carry that rank. Officers appointed to such positions bear temporary four-star rank while so serving, and are allowed to retire at that rank if their performance is judged satisfactory. The total number of active-duty four-star generals in the Space Force is limited to a fixed percentage of the number of Space Force general officers serving at all ranks.

Within the Space Force, the chief of space operations (CSO) is a four-star general by statute. Other four-star generals can occupy positions of designated importance; including the vice chief of space operations (VCSO) and the commander of the United States Space Command (USSPACECOM).

The Space Force also competes with the other services for a number of joint four-star positions, such as the chairman (CJCS) and vice chairman (VJCS) of the Joint Chiefs of Staff. Other joint four-star positions have included unified combatant commanders, sub-unified combatant commands, and certain NATO staff positions.

== Legislation ==
The following list of Congressional legislation includes major acts of Congress pertaining to appointments to the grade of general in the United States Space Force.

Legislation	Citation	Summary
Act of December 20, 2019 [United States Space Force Act]	133 Stat. 1561; 133 Stat. 1563	Redesignated Air Force Space Command as U.S. Space Force.; Established chief of space operations with grade of general, who could serve concurrently as commander of U.S. Space Command for one year following the enactment of this Act, without further appointment (John W. Raymond).
Act of December 23, 2022 [James M. Inhofe National Defense Authorization Act for Fiscal Year 2023]	136 Stat. 2557	Capped Space Force officers in the grade of general at 2, exempting generals assigned to joint duty.

== See also ==
- General (United States)
- List of active duty United States four-star officers
- List of United States Army four-star generals
- List of United States Marine Corps four-star generals
- List of United States Navy four-star admirals
- List of United States Air Force four-star generals
- List of United States Coast Guard four-star admirals
- List of United States Public Health Service Commissioned Corps four-star admirals
- List of United States Space Force lieutenant generals
- List of active duty United States Space Force general officers
- List of United States military leaders by rank
