= Academy of Military Science =

Academy of Military Science may refer to:

- Academy of Military Sciences (China), the top Chinese military research institute
- Academy of Military Science (United States), an officer commissioning program of the US Air Force
- Academy of Military Science (Russia), a military non-government institute in Russia
- Venezuelan Academy of Military Sciences, a military academy in Venezuela
