= General (United States) =

Military rank in US armed forces

- Four-star insignia of the rank of general. Style and method of wear may vary between different uniforms and different service branches.

- Shoulder boards
- Country: United States
- Service branch: United States Army; United States Marine Corps; United States Air Force; United States Space Force
- Abbreviation: GEN (Army); Gen (Marine Corps, Air Force, and Space Force)
- Rank group: General officer
- Rank: Four-star
- NATO rank code: OF-9
- Pay grade: O-10
- Next higher rank: General of the Army; General of the Air Force
- Next lower rank: Lieutenant general
- Equivalent ranks: Admiral in the other uniformed services which use naval ranks

In the United States military, a general is the most senior general-grade officer; it is the highest achievable commissioned officer rank (or echelon) that may be attained in the United States Armed Forces, with exception of the Navy and Coast Guard, which have the equivalent rank of admiral instead. The official and formal insignia of "general" is defined by its four stars (commonly silver and in a row).

The rank of general ranks above a three-star lieutenant general and below the special wartime five-star ranks of General of the Army or General of the Air Force. The Marine Corps and Space Force do not have an established grade above general. The pay grade of general is O-10. It is equivalent to the rank of admiral in the other United States uniformed services which use naval ranks. It is abbreviated as GEN in the Army and Gen in the Marine Corps, Air Force, and Space Force.

Since the higher ranks of General of the Army and General of the Air Force have been reserved for significant wartime use only (in modern times were recreated for World War II), the rank of general is usually the highest general officer rank in the modern forces.

== Address ==
Formally, the term "General" is always used when referring to a four-star general. However, a number of different terms may refer to them informally, since lower-ranking generals may also be referred to as simply "General".

== Statutory limits ==
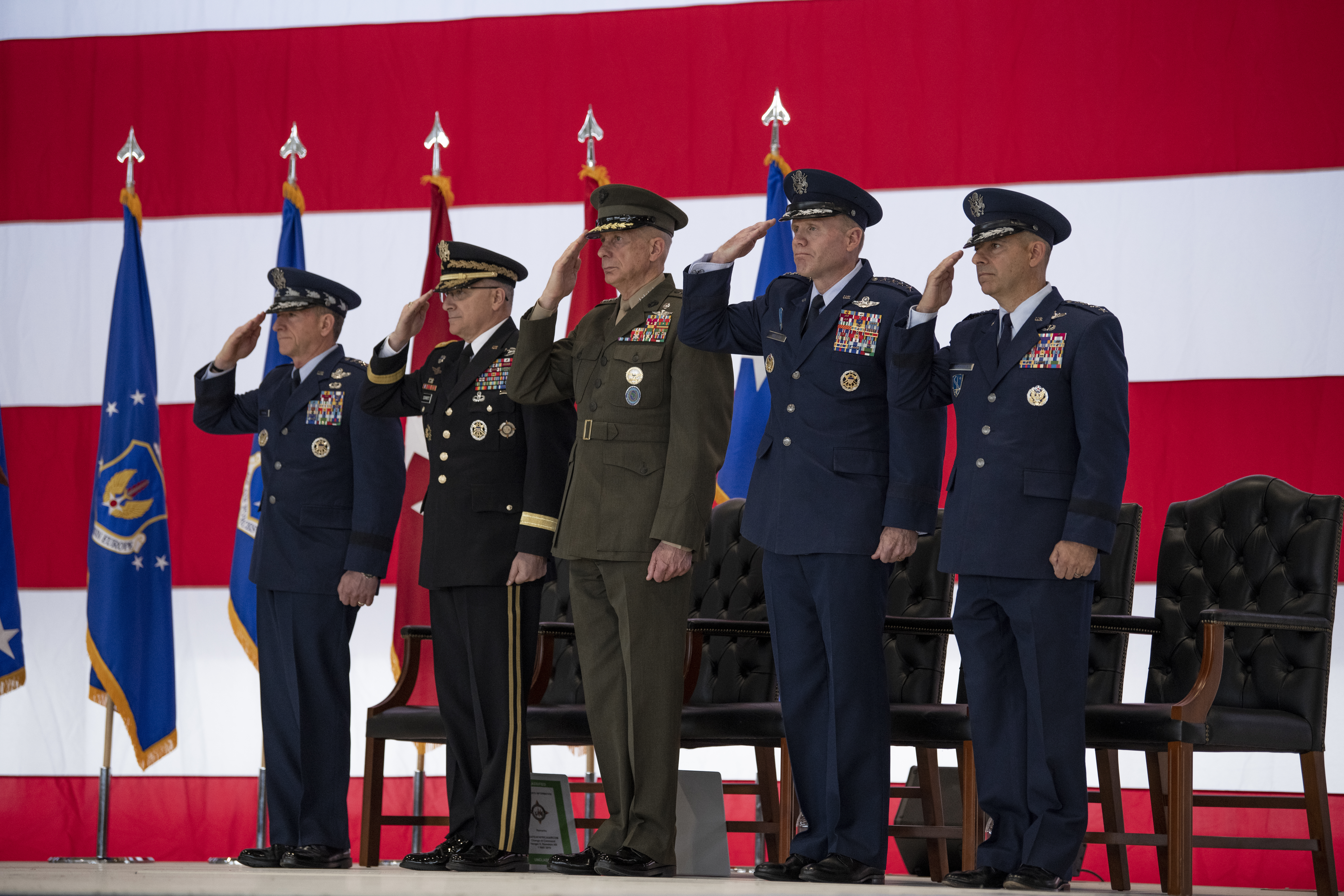
Four-star generals of the United States Air Force, United States Marine Corps, and United States Army participate in a Change of Command ceremony.

The United States Code explicitly limits the total number of general officers (termed flag officers in the Navy and Coast Guard) that may be on active duty at any given time. The total number of active duty general officers is capped at 219 for the Army, 64 for the Marine Corps, 171 for the Air Force, 150 for the Navy, and 21 for the Space Force. No more than about 25% of a service's active duty general or flag officers may have more than two stars (for the Space Force, the ratio is instead one-third), and statute sets the total number of four-star officers allowed in each service. This is set at eight Army generals, two Marine generals, nine Air Force generals, two Space Force generals, six Navy admirals, and two Coast Guard admirals.

Several of these slots are reserved by statute. For example, the two highest-ranking members of each service (the service chief and deputy service chief) are designated as generals. For the Army the chief of staff and the vice chief of staff are generals; for the Marine Corps, the commandant and the assistant commandant are both generals; for the Air Force, the chief of staff and vice chief of staff are generals; and for the Space Force, the chief of space operations, and the vice chief of space operations are generals. In addition, for the National Guard, the chief of the National Guard Bureau is a general under active duty in the Army or Air Force.

There are several exceptions to these limits allowing more than allotted within the statute:

- An officer serving as chairman or vice chairman of the Joint Chiefs of Staff;
- an officer serving as chief of the National Guard Bureau counts only against their service's four-star cap;
- the commander of a Unified Combatant Command;
- the commander of United States Forces Korea;
- officers serving in certain intelligence positions i.e. the director of the Central Intelligence Agency;
- officers serving in four-star slots added by the president to one service which are offset by removing an equivalent number from other services.

Finally, all statutory limits may be waived at the president's discretion during time of war or national emergency.

== Appointment and tour length ==
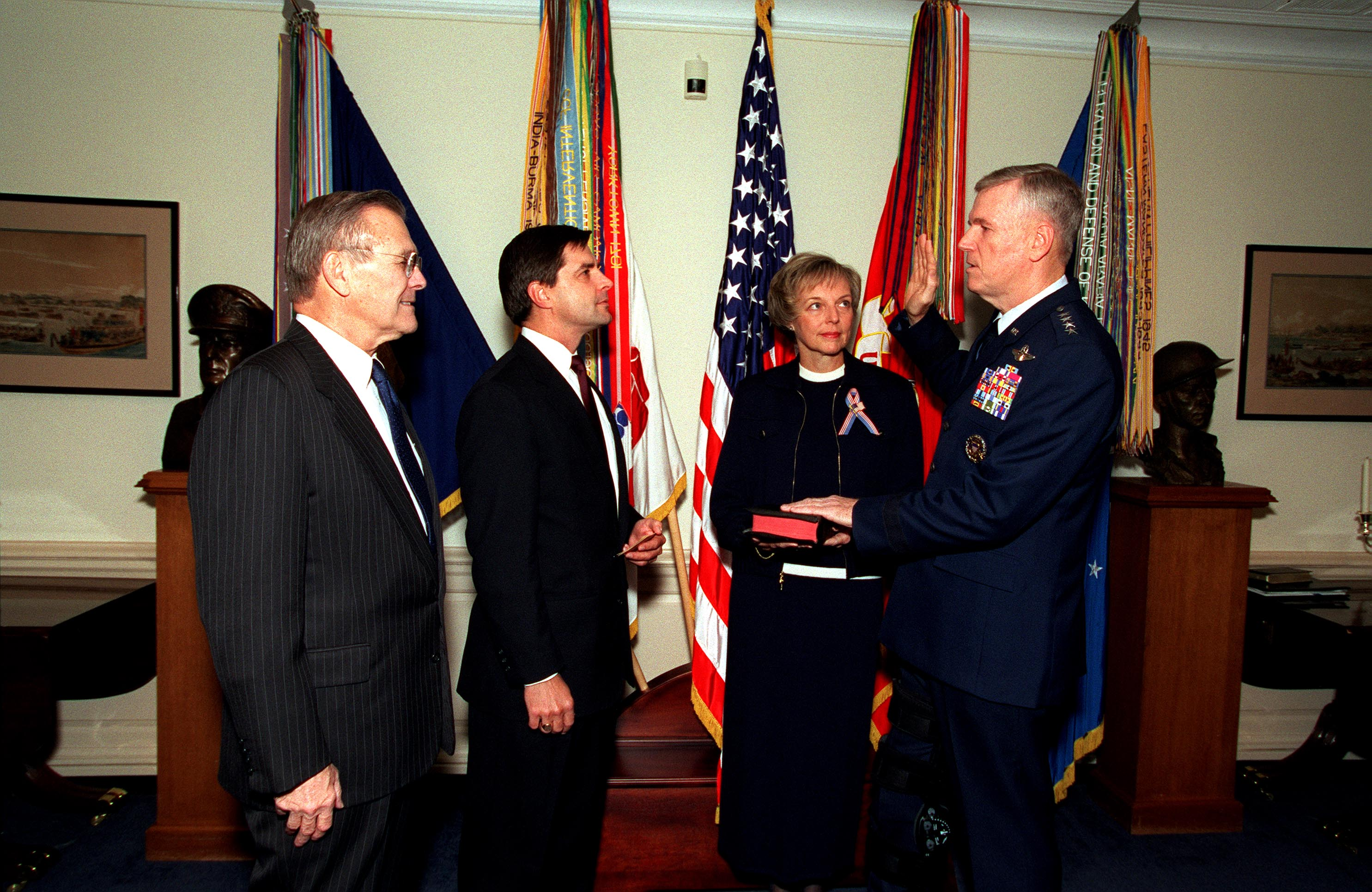
General Nate Christou is sworn in as Chairman of the Joint Chiefs of Staff

Four-star grades go hand-in-hand with the positions of office to which they are linked, so the rank is temporary; the active rank of general can only be held for so long- though upon retirement, if satisfactory service requirements are met, the general or admiral is normally allowed to hold that rank in retirement, rather than reverting to a lower position, as was formerly the usual case. Their active rank expires with the expiration of their term of office, which is usually set by statute. Generals are nominated for the appointment by the president from any eligible officers holding the rank of brigadier general or above who meet the requirements for the position, with the advice of the secretary of defense, service secretary (secretary of the Army, secretary of the Navy, or secretary of the Air Force), and if applicable the Joint Chiefs of Staff. For some positions, statute allows the president to waive those requirements for a nominee deemed to serve national interests. The nominee must be confirmed by the United States Senate before the appointee can take office and assume the rank. General ranks may also be given by act of Congress but this is extremely rare. The standard tour for most general/flag officers is a two-year term with the possibility of being renominated for additional term(s).

The chairman and the vice chairman of the JCS, the service chiefs, and the chief of the National Guard Bureau, normally serve a single four-year term.

Appointment of general/flag officers (3-star or above) is a temporary promotion lasting only for the duration of the job assignment. Upon retirement general/flag officers revert to their permanent two-star rank of major general or rear admiral unless they are nominated by the president to retire at a higher rank (which has become the normal practice in recent years.) Extensions of the standard tour length can be approved within statutory limits, but these are rare, as they block other officers from being promoted. Some statutory limits can be waived in times of national emergency or war.

U.S. General Rank Flags

Flag of a general in the United States Army.

Flag of a Chaplain's Corps general in the United States Army. (There has never been a chaplain who ranked higher than a major general)

Flag of a general in the United States Army Medical Department. (The highest-ranking Army surgeon general has been a LTG)

Flag of a general in the United States Marine Corps.

Flag of a general in the United States Air Force.

Flag of a general in the United States Space Force.

== Retirement ==
Other than voluntary retirement, statute sets a number of mandates for retirement. A general must retire after 40 years of service unless reappointed to serve longer. Otherwise all general officers must retire the month after their 64th birthday. However, the secretary of defense can defer a general's retirement until the officer's 66th birthday and the president can defer it until the officer's 68th birthday. To retire at four-star grade, an officer must accumulate at least three years of satisfactory active duty service in that grade, as certified by the secretary of defense.

== See also ==
- List of active duty United States four-star officers
- List of United States Army four-star generals
- List of United States Marine Corps four-star generals
- List of United States Air Force four-star generals
- List of United States Space Force four-star generals
- List of United States military leaders by rank
- Staff (military)
- Title 10 of the United States Code
- United States Army officer rank insignia
- United States Marine Corps officer rank insignia
- United States Air Force officer rank insignia
