= List of United States Public Health Service Commissioned Corps four-star admirals =

Flag of a U.S. Public Health Service four-star admiral (assistant secretary for health)

The rank of admiral (or full admiral, or four-star admiral), ranks above vice admiral (three-star admiral) and is the highest rank achievable in the United States Public Health Service Commissioned Corps.

There have been seven four-star admirals in the history of the U.S. Public Health Service Commissioned Corps. All seven were directly commissioned into the regular corps. One was already an officer in the regular corps and the other six were originally civilians who were appointed to the regular corps and to grade upon taking office.

== List of admirals ==
The following lists of four-star admirals are sortable by last name, date of rank. The date listed is that of the officer's first promotion to admiral, and may differ from the officer's entry in the U.S. Public Health Service register. The year commissioned is taken to be the year the officer was directly commissioned which may precede the officer's actual date of commission by up to two years. Each entry lists the admiral's name, date of rank, active-duty position held while serving at four-star rank, number of years of active-duty service at four-star rank (Yrs), year commissioned and source of commission, number of years in commission when promoted to four-star rank (YC), and other biographical notes.

#	Name	Photo	Date of rank	Position	Yrs	Commission	YC	Notes
1	James O. Mason		1 Oct 1989	Assistant Secretary for Health/U.S. Representative, Executive Board of the World Health Organization (ASH/USREPWHO), 1989–1993.	4	1983 (direct)	6	(1930–2019) Acting Surgeon General, 1989–1990.
2	David Satcher		13 Feb 1998	Assistant Secretary for Health/Surgeon General (ASH/SG), 1998–2001.	3	1998 (direct)	0	(1941– ) Reverted down to a vice admiral in 2001 after completing three years as ASH but remained as Surgeon General until 2002.
3	John O. Agwunobi		4 Jan 2006	Assistant Secretary for Health (ASH), 2006–2007.	2	2005 (direct)	0	
4	Joxel García		28 Mar 2008	Assistant Secretary for Health/U.S. Representative, Executive Board of the World Health Organization (ASH/USREPWHO), 2008–2009.	1	2008 (direct)	0	(1962– ) First Puerto Rican to serve as Assistant Secretary for Health.
5	Brett P. Giroir		22 Feb 2018	Assistant Secretary for Health/Senior Advisor for Mental Health and Opioid Policy (ASH/Senior Advisor), 2018–2020.; Assistant Secretary for Health/U.S. Representative, Executive Board of the World Health Organization/Senior Advisor for Mental Health and Opioid Policy/Director, Coronavirus Diagnostic Testing (ASH/USREPWHO/Senior Advisor/Director), 2020–2021.	3	2018 (direct)	0	(1960– ) Acting Commissioner, Food and Drugs Administration 2019.
6	Rachel L. Levine		19 Oct 2021	Assistant Secretary for Health (ASH), 2021–2025.	4	2021 (direct)	0	(1957– ) Secretary, Pennsylvania Department of Health, 2017–2021. First openly transgender person to achieve four-star rank in any uniformed service.
7	Brian Christine		11 Nov 2025	Assistant Secretary for Health/Head of the U.S. Public Health Service Commissioned Corps (ASH/HEAD USPHSCC), 2025–present.	1	2025 (direct)	0	(1963– ) Brother of Army Major General Bobby Christine.

== Legislation ==
The following list of Congressional legislation includes major acts of Congress pertaining to appointments to the grade of admiral in the United States Public Health Service Commissioned Corps.

Legislation	Citation	Summary
Act of November 3, 1990	104 Stat. 1289	Specified O-10 grade for a commissioned officer of the Public Health Service serving as Assistant Secretary for Health.

== See also ==
- Admiral (United States)
- List of active duty United States four-star officers
- List of United States Army four-star generals
- List of United States Marine Corps four-star generals
- List of United States Navy four-star admirals
- List of United States Air Force four-star generals
- List of United States Space Force four-star generals
- List of United States Coast Guard four-star admirals
- List of United States Public Health Service Commissioned Corps vice admirals
- List of United States military leaders by rank
