= List of active duty United States four-star officers =

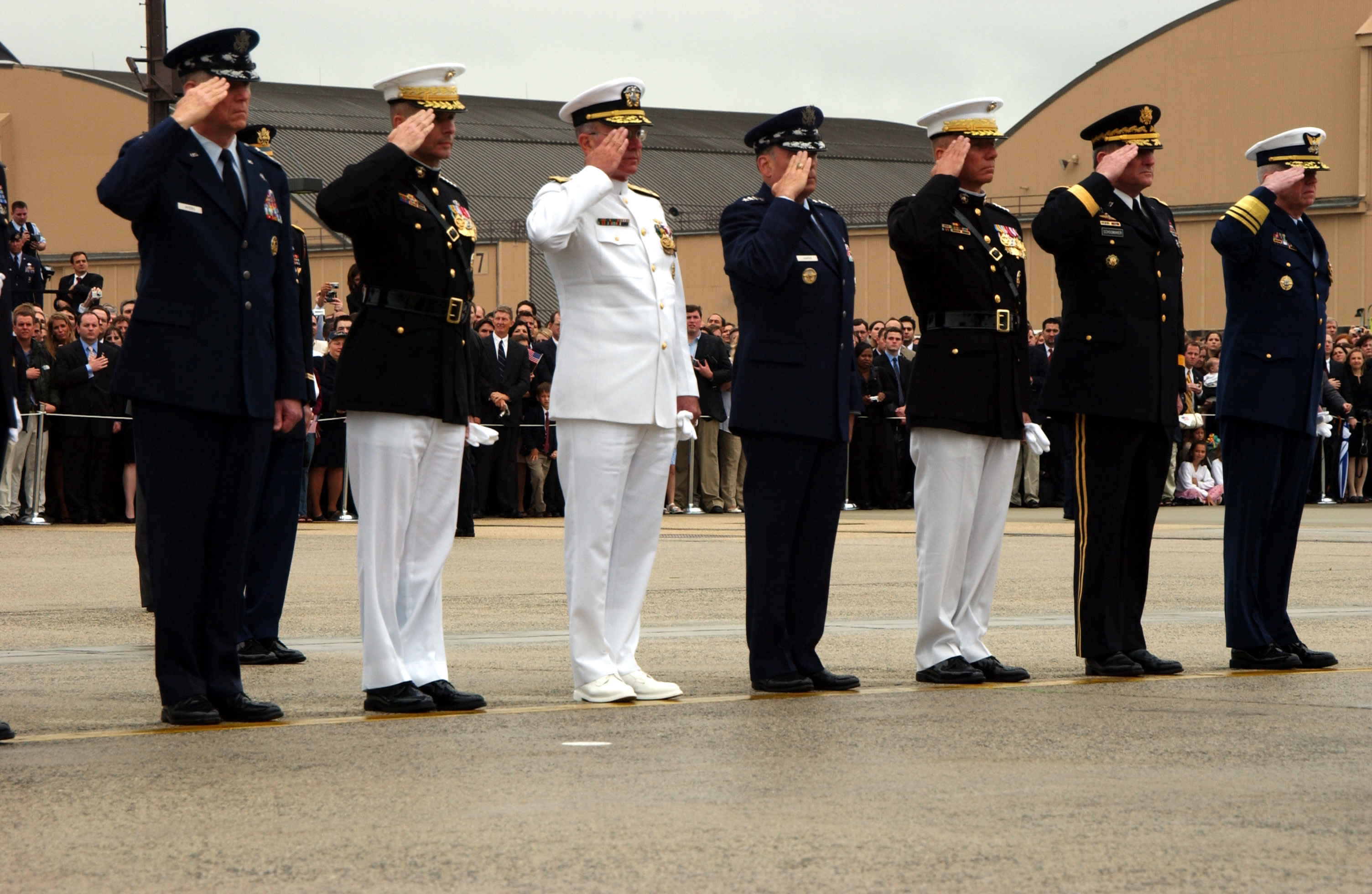
Members of the Joint Chiefs of Staff render a salute during the departure ceremony at Andrews Air Force Base for former President Ronald Reagan, 11 June 2004.

There are currently 38 active-duty four-star officers in the uniformed services of the United States: six in the Army, four in the Marine Corps, 10 in the Navy, 12 in the Air Force, four in the Space Force, two in the Coast Guard, and one in the Public Health Service Commissioned Corps. Of the eight federal uniformed services, the NOAA Commissioned Officer Corps is the only service that does not have an established four-star position.

== List of designated four-star positions ==
=== Department of Defense ===
==== Joint Chiefs of Staff ====
Position insignia	Position	Photo	Incumbent	Service branch
Chairman of the Joint Chiefs of Staff	Chairman of the Joint Chiefs of Staff (CJCS)		General; J. Daniel Caine	U.S. Air Force
Vice Chairman of the Joint Chiefs of Staff	Vice Chairman of the Joint Chiefs of Staff (VJCS)		General; Christopher J. Mahoney	U.S. Marine Corps

==== Unified combatant commands ====
Position insignia	Position	Photo	Incumbent	Service branch
U.S. Africa Command	Commander, U.S. Africa Command (USAFRICOM)		General; Dagvin R. M. Anderson	U.S. Air Force
U.S. Central Command	Commander, U.S. Central Command (USCENTCOM)		Admiral; C. Bradford Cooper II	U.S. Navy
U.S. Cyber Command National Security Agency Central Security Service	Commander, U.S. Cyber Command (USCYBERCOM), Director, National Security Agency (NSA) and Chief, Central Security Service (CSS)		General; Joshua M. Rudd	U.S. Army
U.S. European Command Supreme Allied Commander Europe	Commander, U.S. European Command (USEUCOM) and Supreme Allied Commander Europe (SACEUR)		General; Alexus G. Grynkewich	U.S. Air Force
U.S. Northern Command North American Aerospace Defense Command	Commander, U.S. Northern Command (USNORTHCOM) and Commander, North American Aerospace Defense Command (NORAD)		General; Gregory M. Guillot	U.S. Air Force
U.S. Pacific Command	Commander, U.S. Pacific Command (USPACOM)		Admiral; Samuel J. Paparo Jr.	U.S. Navy
U.S. Southern Command	Commander, U.S. Southern Command (USSOUTHCOM)		General; Francis L. Donovan	U.S. Marine Corps
U.S. Space Command	Commander, U.S. Space Command (USSPACECOM)		General; Stephen N. Whiting; Retiring	U.S. Space Force
U.S. Special Operations Command	Commander, U.S. Special Operations Command (USSOCOM)		Admiral; Frank M. Bradley	U.S. Navy
U.S. Strategic Command	Commander, U.S. Strategic Command (USSTRATCOM)		Admiral; Richard A. Correll	U.S. Navy
U.S. Transportation Command	Commander, U.S. Transportation Command (USTRANSCOM)		General; Randall Reed	U.S. Air Force

==== Other joint positions ====
Position insignia	Position	Photo	Incumbent	Service branch
National Guard
Chief of the National Guard Bureau	Chief of the National Guard Bureau (CNGB)		General; Steven S. Nordhaus	U.S. Air Force
Vice Chief of the National Guard Bureau	Vice Chief of the National Guard Bureau (VCNGB)		General; Thomas M. Carden Jr.	U.S. Army
Sub-unified commands
United Nations Command ROK/U.S. Combined Forces Command U.S. Forces Korea	South Korea; Commander, United Nations Command (UNC), Commander, ROK/U.S. Combined Forces Command (CFC) and Commander, U.S. Forces Korea (USFK)		General; Xavier T. Brunson	U.S. Army
Special activities
Office of the Secretary of Defense	Direct Reporting Portfolio Manager for Critical Major Weapon Systems Programs (CMWS DRPM)		General; Dale R. White	U.S. Air Force
Office of the Secretary of Defense	Direct Reporting Program Manager for Golden Dome for America (GDA DRPM)		General; Michael A. Guetlein	U.S. Space; Force

=== Department of the Army ===
==== United States Army ====
Position insignia	Position	Photo	Incumbent	Service branch
Army staff
Chief of Staff of the Army	Chief of Staff of the Army (CSA)		Vacant	U.S. Army
Vice Chief of Staff of the Army	Vice Chief of Staff of the Army (VCSA)		General; Christopher LaNeve	U.S. Army
Army commands
U.S. Army Transformation and Training Command	Commanding General, U.S. Army Transformation and Training Command (T2COM)		Vacant	U.S. Army
Army service component commands
U.S. Army Pacific	Commanding General, U.S. Army Pacific (USARPAC)		General; Ronald P. Clark	U.S. Army
U.S. Army Western Hemisphere Command	Commanding General, U.S. Army Western Hemisphere Command (USAWHC)		General; Joseph A. Ryan	U.S. Army

=== Department of the Navy ===
==== United States Marine Corps ====
Position insignia	Position	Photo	Incumbent	Service branch
Headquarters Marine Corps
Commandant of the Marine Corps	Commandant of the Marine Corps (CMC)		General; Eric M. Smith	U.S. Marine Corps
Assistant Commandant of the Marine Corps	Assistant Commandant of the Marine Corps (ACMC)		General; Bradford J. Gering	U.S. Marine Corps

==== United States Navy ====
Position insignia	Position	Photo	Incumbent	Service branch
Office of the Chief of Naval Operations
Chief of Naval Operations	Chief of Naval Operations (CNO)		Admiral; Daryl L. Caudle	U.S. Navy
Vice Chief of Naval Operations	Vice Chief of Naval Operations (VCNO)		Admiral; James W. Kilby; Retiring	U.S. Navy
Naval Reactors	Director, Naval Nuclear Propulsion Program (NAVSEA 08) (Note: Historically, the director of the Naval Nuclear Propulsion Program is held by an officer in the Navy; however, 50 U.S.C. § 2511 – Executive Order No. 12344, states a civilian can be appointed to that position without joining or being a serving member of the Navy.) and Deputy Administrator for Naval Reactors, National Nuclear Security Administration (NNSA NA-30) (Note: By statute, 50 U.S.C. § 2406, any person serving as Director, Naval Nuclear Propulsion Program also concurrently serves as the National Nuclear Security Administration's Deputy Administrator, Naval Reactors.)		Admiral; William J. Houston	U.S. Navy
Operating forces
U.S. Fleet Forces Command	Commander, U.S. Fleet Forces Command (USFFC)		Admiral; Karl O. Thomas	U.S. Navy
U.S. Naval Forces Europe-Africa Allied Joint Force Command Naples	Commander, U.S. Naval Forces Europe-Africa (CNE-CNA) and Commander, Allied Joint Force Command Naples (JFC Naples)		Admiral; George M. Wikoff	U.S. Navy
U.S. Pacific Fleet	Commander, U.S. Pacific Fleet (USPACFLT)		Admiral; Stephen T. Koehler	U.S. Navy

=== Department of the Air Force ===
==== United States Air Force ====
Position insignia	Position	Photo	Incumbent	Service branch
Air staff
Chief of Staff of the Air Force	Chief of Staff of the Air Force (CSAF)		General; Kenneth S. Wilsbach	U.S. Air Force
Vice Chief of Staff of the Air Force	Vice Chief of Staff of the Air Force (VCSAF)		General; John D. Lamontagne	U.S. Air Force
Air Force major commands
Air Combat Command	Commander, Air Combat Command (ACC)		General; Adrian L. Spain	U.S. Air Force
Air Force Global Strike Command	Commander, Air Force Global Strike Command (AFGSC), Commander, Air Forces Strategic – Air, U.S. Strategic Command and Joint Force Air Component Commander (JFACC)		General; Stephen L. Davis	U.S. Air Force
Pacific Air Forces	Commander, Pacific Air Forces (PACAF), Air Component Commander for U.S. Pacific Command and Executive Director, Pacific Air Combat Operations Staff (PACOPS)		General; Kevin B. Schneider	U.S. Air Force

==== United States Space Force ====
Position insignia	Position	Photo	Incumbent	Service branch
Office of the Chief of Space Operations
Chief of Space Operations	Chief of Space Operations (CSO)		General; Douglas A. Schiess	U.S. Space; Force
Vice Chief of Space Operations	Vice Chief of Space Operations (VCSO)		General; Shawn N. Bratton	U.S. Space; Force

=== Department of Homeland Security ===
==== United States Coast Guard ====
Position insignia	Position	Photo	Incumbent	Service branch
Office of the Commandant
Commandant of the Coast Guard	Commandant of the Coast Guard		Admiral; Kevin E. Lunday	U.S. Coast Guard
Vice Commandant of the Coast Guard	Vice Commandant of the Coast Guard		Admiral; Thomas G. Allan Jr.	U.S. Coast Guard

=== Department of Health and Human Services ===
==== United States Public Health Service Commissioned Corps ====
Position insignia	Position	Photo	Incumbent	Service branch
Office of the Assistant Secretary for Health
Assistant Secretary for Health	Assistant Secretary for Health (ASH) (Note: The position of Assistant Secretary of Health has historically been held by either a civilian or an officer in the U.S. Public Health Service Commissioned Corps.) and Head of the U.S. Public Health Service Commissioned Corps (USPHSCC)		Admiral; Brian Christine	U.S. Public Health Service

== List of pending appointments ==
Designated position insignia	Designated position	Current position	Photo	Name	Service branch	Status and date
Unified combatant commands
U.S. Space Command	Commander, U.S. Space Command (USSPACECOM)	Deputy Chief of Space Operations for Strategy, Plans, Programs, and Requirements (S5/8)		Lieutenant General; David N. Miller	U.S. Space Force	Nomination sent to the Senate; 29 September 2026
United States Army
Chief of Staff of the Army	Chief of Staff of the Army (CSA)	Vice Chief of Staff of the Army		General; Christopher C. LaNeve	U.S. Army	Nomination sent to the Senate; 16 November 2026
United States Navy
Vice Chief of Naval Operations	Vice Chief of Naval Operations (VCNO)	Deputy Chief of Naval Operations for Integration of Capabilities and Resources (N8)		Vice Admiral; John B. Skillman	U.S. Navy	Nomination sent to the Senate; 29 September 2026

== Statutory limits ==
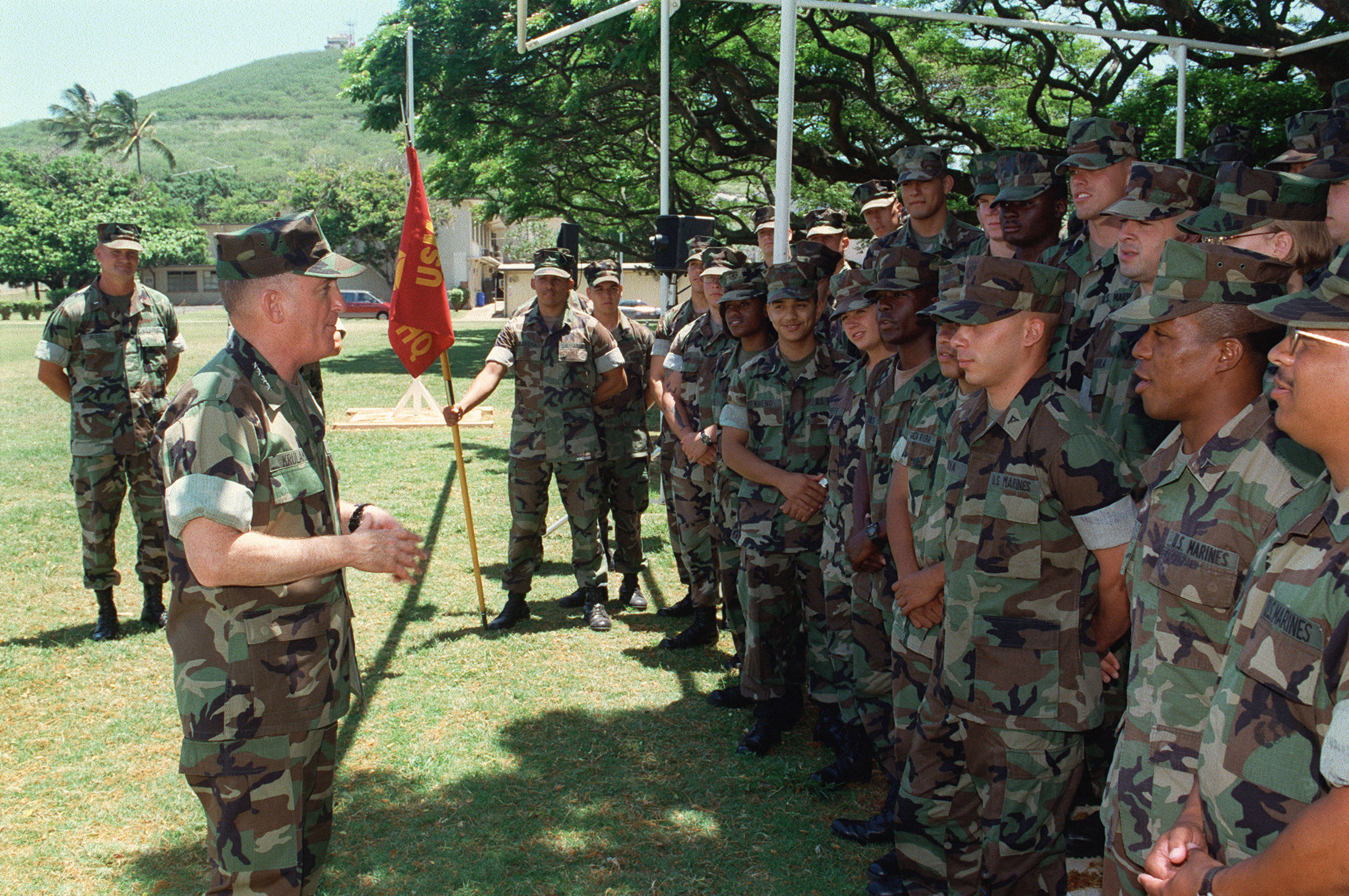
Gen. Charles C. Krulak, commandant of the Marine Corps, addresses the Marines of Headquarters Battalion, Kaneohe Bay, Marine Corps Base Hawaii, during his farewell tour on 26 May 1999.

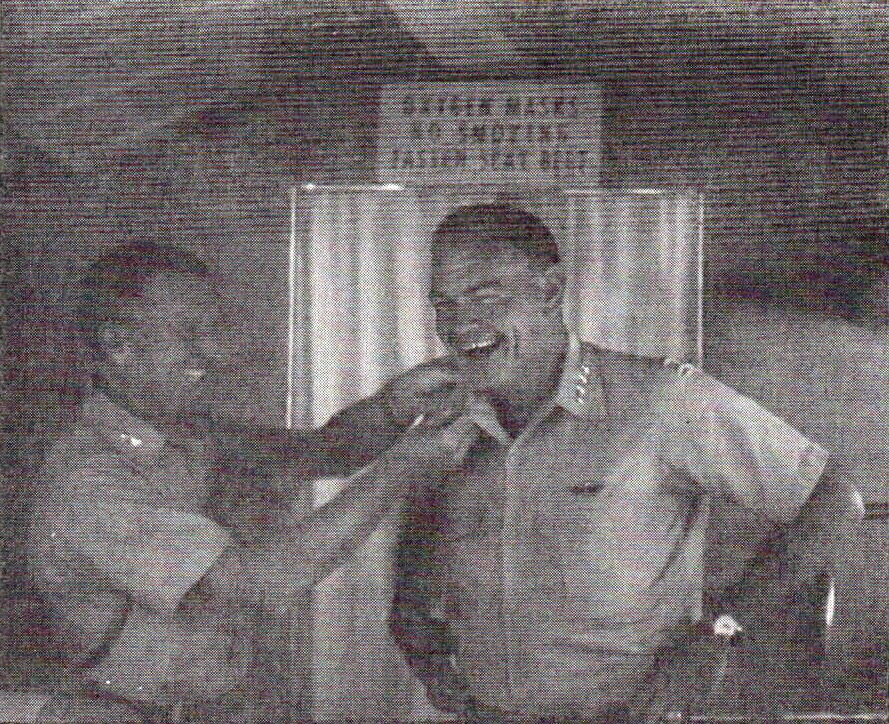
Gen. George S. Brown is pinned with four-star insignia by Air Force vice chief of staff Gen. Bruce K. Holloway.

The U.S. Code explicitly limits the total number of four-star officers that may be on active duty at any given time. The total number of active-duty general or flag officers is capped at 219 for the Army, 150 for the Navy, 171 for the Air Force, 64 for the Marine Corps, and 21 for the Space Force. For the Army, Marine Corps, Navy and Air Force, no more than 28% (Note: Dividing the total number of allotted general and flag officers above two stars (175) from the total number of general and flag officers overall (625) is 28.00%.) of each service's active-duty general or flag officers may have more than two stars, and statute sets the total number of four-star officers allowed in each service. This is set at eight four-star Army generals, six four-star Navy admirals, nine four-star Air Force generals, two four-star Marine generals, two four-star Space Force generals, and two four-star Coast Guard admirals.

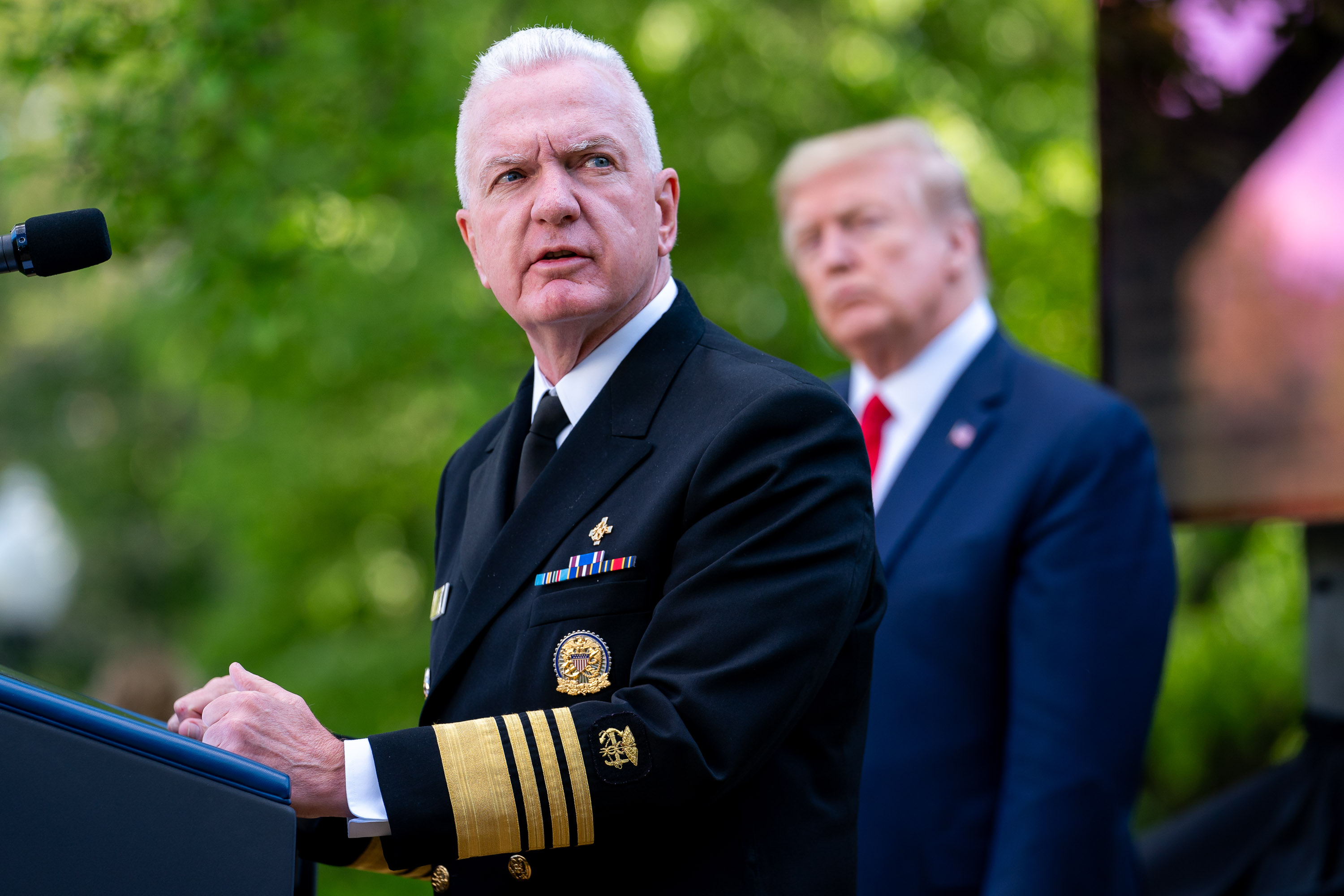
Assistant Secretary of Health Adm. Brett P. Giroir speaks at a COVID-19 update briefing in the White House Rose Garden, 27 April 2020.

Several of these slots are reserved by statute. For the Army and the Air Force, the chief of staff and the vice chief of staff for both services are all four-star generals. For the Navy, the chief and vice chief of naval operations are both four-star admirals. For the Marine Corps, the commandant and the assistant commandant are both four-star generals. For the Space Force, the chief and vice chief of space operations are both four-star generals. For the Coast Guard, the commandant and the vice commandant are both four-star admirals. For the National Guard, the chief and vice chief of the National Guard Bureau are four-star generals under reserve active duty in the Army or Air Force. And for the Public Health Service Commissioned Corps, the assistant secretary for health is a four-star admiral if they hold an active-duty appointment to the regular corps.

=== Exceptions ===
There are several exceptions to the limits allowing more than allotted four-star officers within the statute. Four-star officers serving as chairman or vice chairman of the Joint Chiefs of Staff do not count against their service's general- or flag-officer cap, likewise for joint positions such as the unified combatant commanders, the commander of U.S. Forces Korea, and the chief and vice chief of the National Guard Bureau. Officers serving in certain intelligence positions are also not counted against statutory limits, including the director of the Central Intelligence Agency. The president can also appoint up to five additional four-star officers in any one service in excess of that service's four-star limit, as long as they are offset by reducing an equivalent number of four-stars from other services. Finally, all statutory limits may be waived at the president's discretion during time of war or national emergency.

== Appointment ==
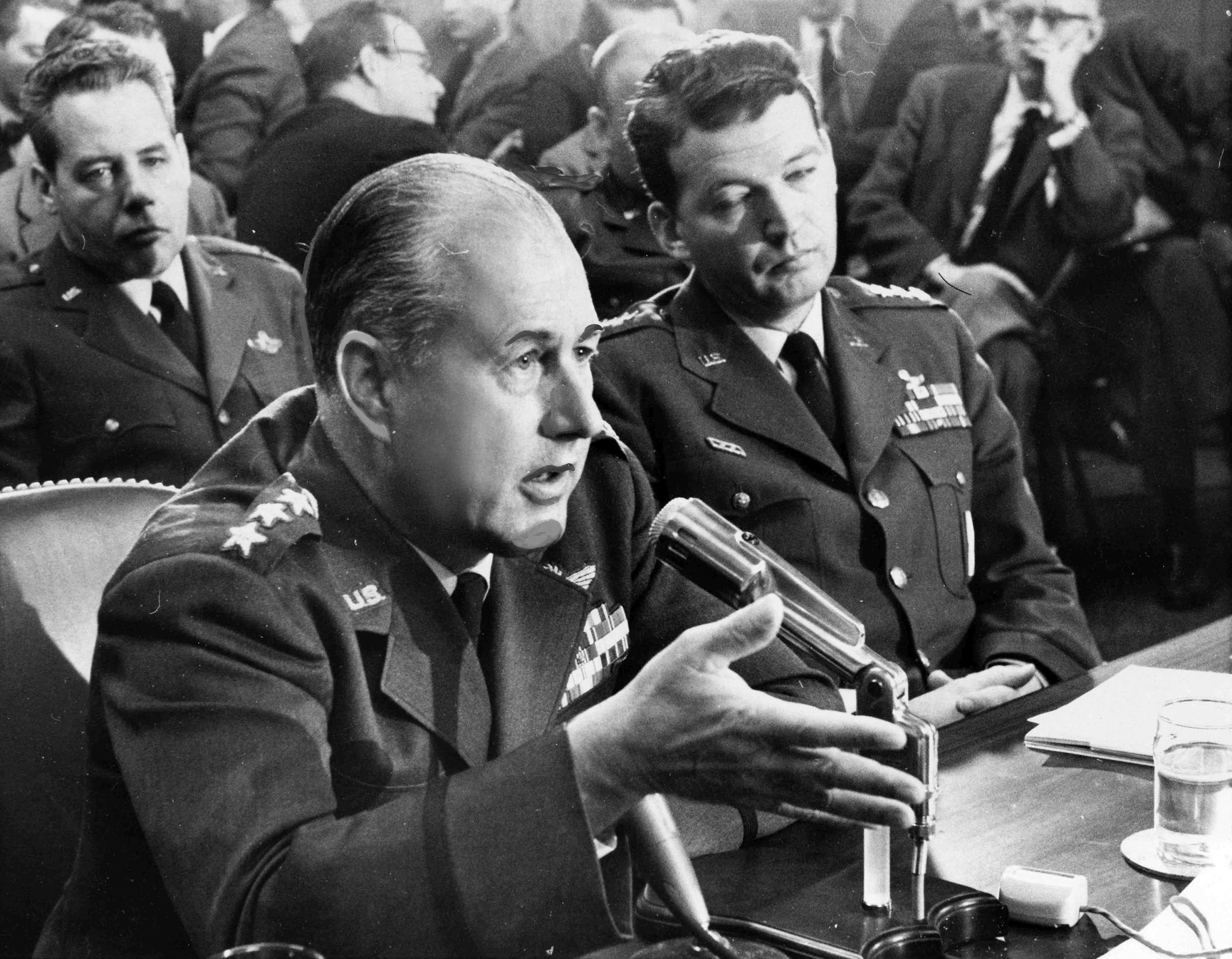
Gen. Thomas S. Power and Gen. Bernard A. Schriever testify at a 1962 Senate Armed Services Committee hearing.

Four-star rank and grade are temporary in nature; officers may achieve four stars only if they are appointed to positions that require or allow the officer to hold the rank. Their rank expires with the expiration of their term of office, which is usually set by statute. Four-star officers are nominated for appointment by the president from any eligible officers holding a one-star rank or above, who also meets the other requirements for the position, under the advice or suggestion of their respective executive department secretary, service secretary, and if applicable the Joint Chiefs. The nominee must be confirmed via majority by the Senate before they can take office and thus assume the rank. The Senate, normally in committee, (Note: Department of Defense nominees are considered by the Senate Armed Services Committee, Coast Guard nominees are considered by the Senate Commerce Committee, and the director of the National Security Agency is considered by the Senate Intelligence Committee.) may hold hearings to consider any nominee for appointment or reappointment to four-star rank, but usually convenes for only nominations of the chairman of the Joint Chiefs of Staff, vice chairman, service chiefs, (Note: This refers to the chiefs of staff of the Army and Air Force, commandant of the Marine Corps, chief of naval operations, chief of space operations and the commandant of the Coast Guard.) the chief of the National Guard Bureau, unified combatant commanders, and the commander of U.S. Forces Korea.

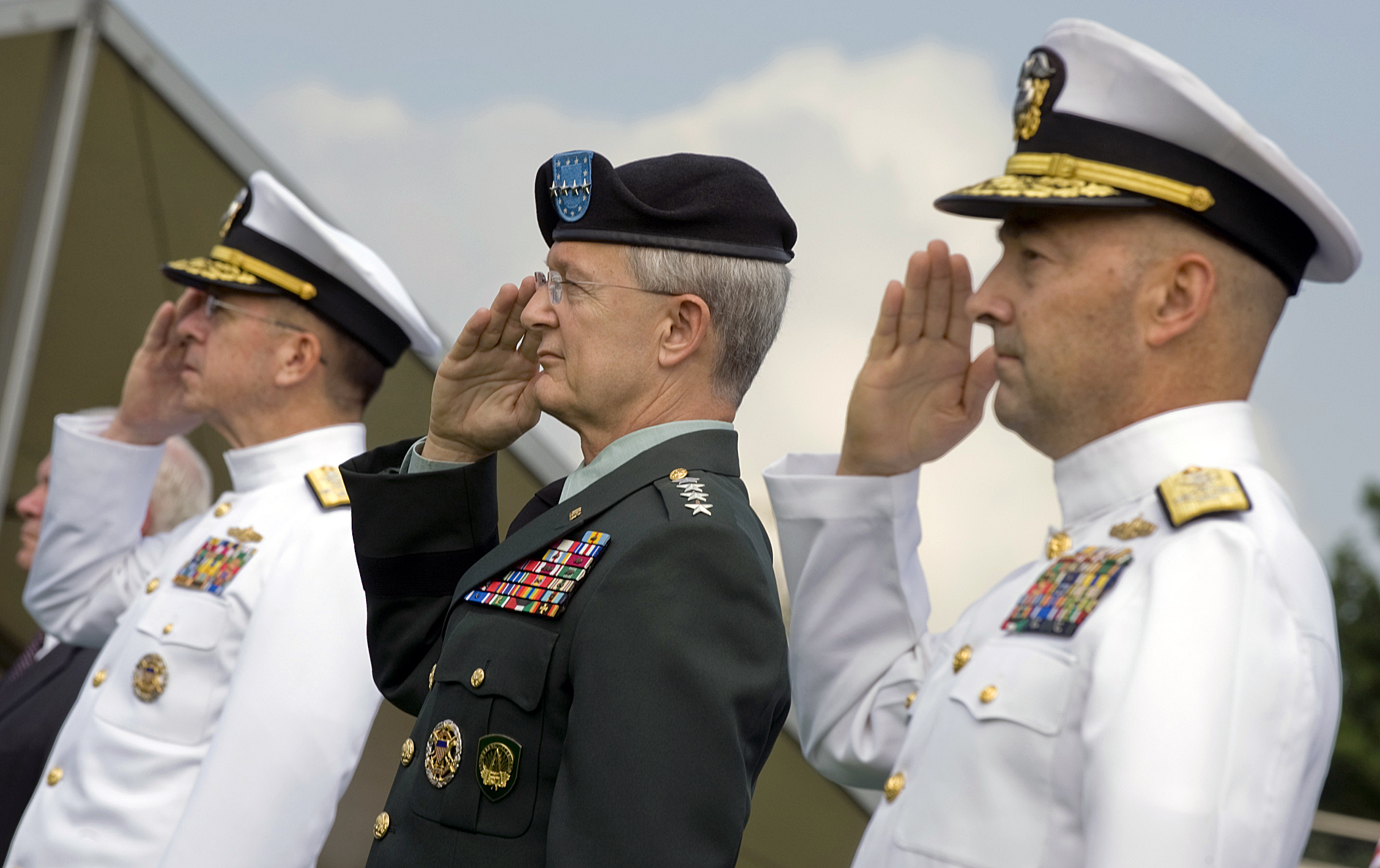
Adm. Michael Mullen, Gen. Bantz J. Craddock, and Adm. James G. Stavridis salute during the USEUCOM change of command ceremony on 30 June 2009.

It is extremely unusual for a four-star nominee to draw even token opposition in a Senate vote, either in committee or on the floor, because the administration usually withdraws or declines to submit nominations that draw controversy before or during the confirmation process.

- For example, upon encountering opposition in the Senate, the administration declined to submit the nomination for General Joseph W. Ralston to be chairman of the Joint Chiefs of Staff in 1997.
- Lieutenant General Ricardo S. Sanchez was once the leading candidate to become commander of U.S. Southern Command in 2004. However, his name was never formally offered after members of the Senate Armed Services Committee took notice of his mismanagement of the Iraq War and the Abu Ghraib prison affair.
- General David L. Goldfein was the leading candidate to replace General Joseph Dunford as chairman of the Joint Chiefs of Staff in 2019; however, due to disagreements between the secretary of defense and the president, the president disregarded the recommendation.
- Lieutenant General Walter E. Piatt was once the leading candidate to take over as the commanding general of U.S. Army Futures Command in 2022. Despite receiving recommendations from several top defense officials, his candidacy was rejected by the president, due to his handling of the National Guard's deployment during the January 6 attacks on the Capitol.

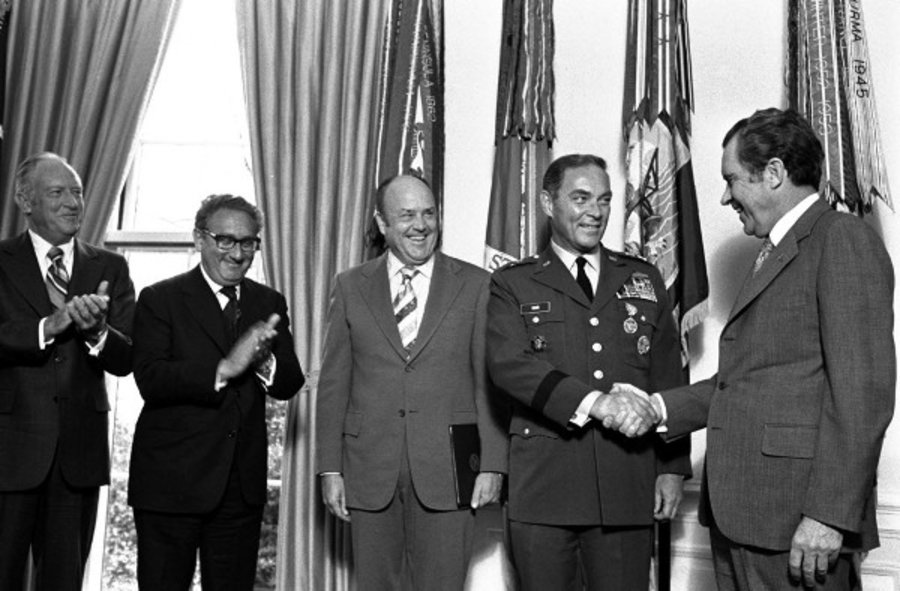
Gen. Alexander Haig is presented the Distinguished Service Medal by President Richard Nixon in the Oval Office on 4 January 1973.

- The president withdrew the nomination of General Alexander Haig to be chief of staff of the Army in 1974, due to controversy regarding his role as the White House chief of staff at the peak of the Watergate scandal which caused the nomination to stall in the Senate.
- General Peter Pace would have faced tough scrutiny from the Senate over the wars in Iraq and Afghanistan had he been nominated for reappointment as chairman of the Joint Chiefs of Staff in 2007.
- The president withdrew the nominations of Admiral Stanley R. Arthur to be commander in chief of U.S. Pacific Command in 1994, and of General Gregory S. Martin to be commander of U.S. Pacific Command in 2004 over their handling of the Tailhook and Darleen Druyun scandals respectively.

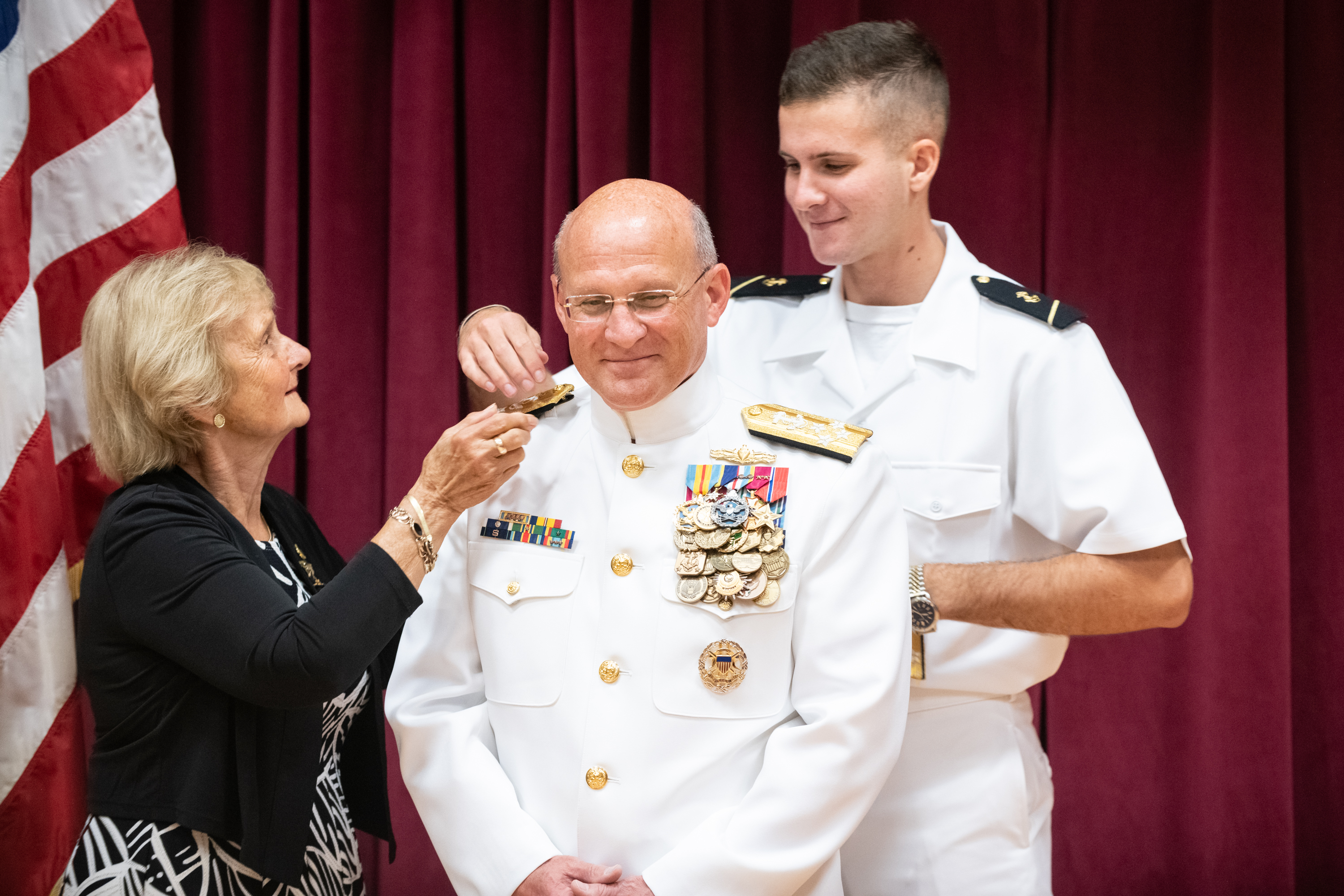
Vice Adm. Michael M. Gilday is pinned with his admiral's shoulder boards on 22 August 2019.

When a doomed nomination is not withdrawn, the Senate typically does not hold a vote to reject the candidate, but instead allows the nomination to expire without action at the end of the legislative session.

- For example, the Senate declined to schedule a vote for the nomination of Lieutenant General James A. Abrahamson to the rank of general, while serving as director of the Strategic Defense Initiative Organization in 1986.
- The Senate also declined to vote on Lieutenant General Charles W. Bagnal's nomination to the rank of general, and as commanding general of U.S. Army Pacific in 1989.
- Major General John D. Lavelle was nominated to be posthumously restored to the rank of general on the retired list in 2010, but the nomination also expired in the Senate without action.
- And Rear Admiral Cristina V. Beato was nominated to be assistant secretary for health in 2003 but her nomination also was not placed on the Senate schedule for a vote. Had Beato been confirmed and assumed office, she would have been the first woman in any uniformed service to achieve four stars; instead that honor went to General Ann E. Dunwoody.

Additionally, events that take place after confirmation may still delay or even prevent the nominee from assuming office, necessitating that another nominee be selected and considered by the Senate.

- For example, Admiral William F. Moran was confirmed in May 2019 to be the chief of naval operations, but abruptly retired due to an investigation into his correspondence with a former subordinate accused of sexual harassment and usage of his personal email for military purposes. Consequently, Vice Admiral Michael M. Gilday was nominated for promotion to admiral and appointment as CNO, for which he was confirmed and assumed office in August 2019.

== Command elevation and reduction ==
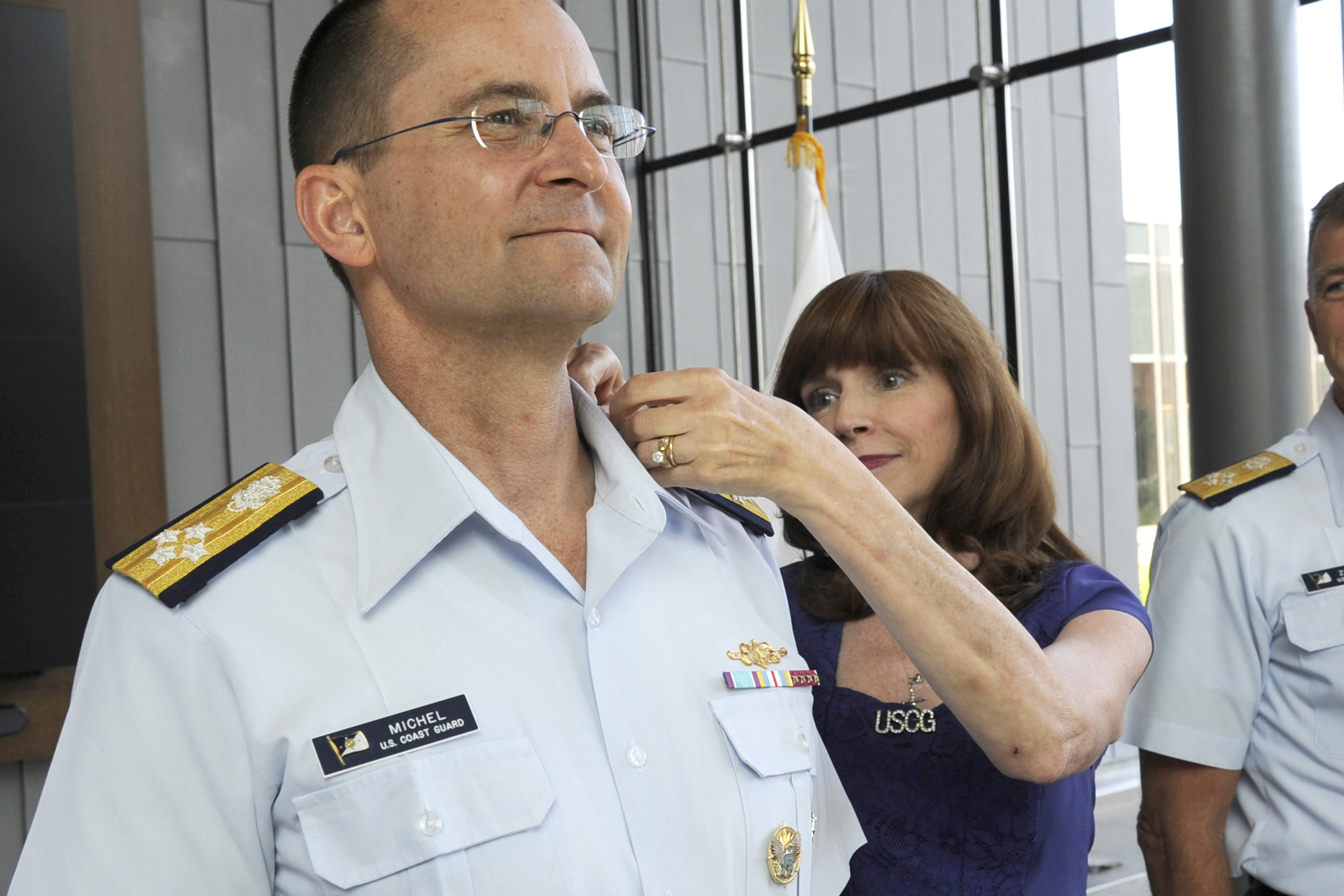
Adm. Charles D. Michel, Coast Guard vice commandant, is pinned with his new rank by his wife Claudia on 1 June 2016.

Gen. Frank J. Grass is sworn in as chief of the National Guard Bureau by Defense Secretary Leon E. Panetta on 17 September 2012.

Any billet in the armed forces may be designated as a position of importance requiring the position holder to be of three-star or four-star rank. One-star and two-star billets may be elevated to three-star or four-star level as appropriate, either by act of Congress, or within statutory limits by the services at their discretion. Congress may propose such elevations or reductions to the president and Department of Defense.

An officer leading a command or office elevated to four-star rank can be promoted while in their present position, reassigned to another office of equal rank, or retire if another nominee is selected as their replacement.

- For example, Lieutenant General Christopher G. Cavoli, commanding general of U.S. Army Europe, was nominated for promotion to general in 2020 concurrent with the merger of his command and U.S. Army Africa into U.S. Army Europe and Africa. He was promoted on 1 October 2020 and assumed command of the consolidated USAREUR-AF on 20 November.
- Lieutenant General Francis J. Wiercinski could have been nominated for promotion to general when U.S. Army Pacific became a four-star command since in May 2013, since he had more than 200 days remaining on his customary three-year tour. Lieutenant General Vincent K. Brooks was instead nominated for promotion, and Wiercinski retired on 4 June 2013.

A lower level billet may be elevated to four-stars to highlight importance to the overall defense apparatus or to achieve parity with equivalent commands in the same area of responsibility or service branch.

- For example, the statutory rank of the vice commandant of the Coast Guard was raised to admiral by the Coast Guard Authorization Act of 2015, to align the leadership structure of the Coast Guard to that of the other armed services and recognize the important role of the vice commandant at the national level. The incumbent vice commandant, Vice Admiral Charles D. Michel, was confirmed for promotion to admiral, and assumed rank on 1 June 2016.
- The statutory rank of the chief of the National Guard Bureau was raised to general by the National Defense Authorization Act of 2008, with significant congressional support. Lieutenant General Craig R. McKinley, then director of the Air National Guard, was confirmed for promotion to general, and assumed rank and office on 17 November 2008.
- The rank of the commander of Air Force Global Strike Command was announced for elevation to general in 2014, in conjunction with Air Education and Training Command being reduced from a four-star to a three-star command. General Robin Rand, outgoing commander of Air Education and Training Command, succeeded Lieutenant General Stephen W. Wilson as Global Strike commander on 28 July 2015, with Lieutenant General Darryl Roberson succeeding him as Air Education and Training commander.

== Tour length ==
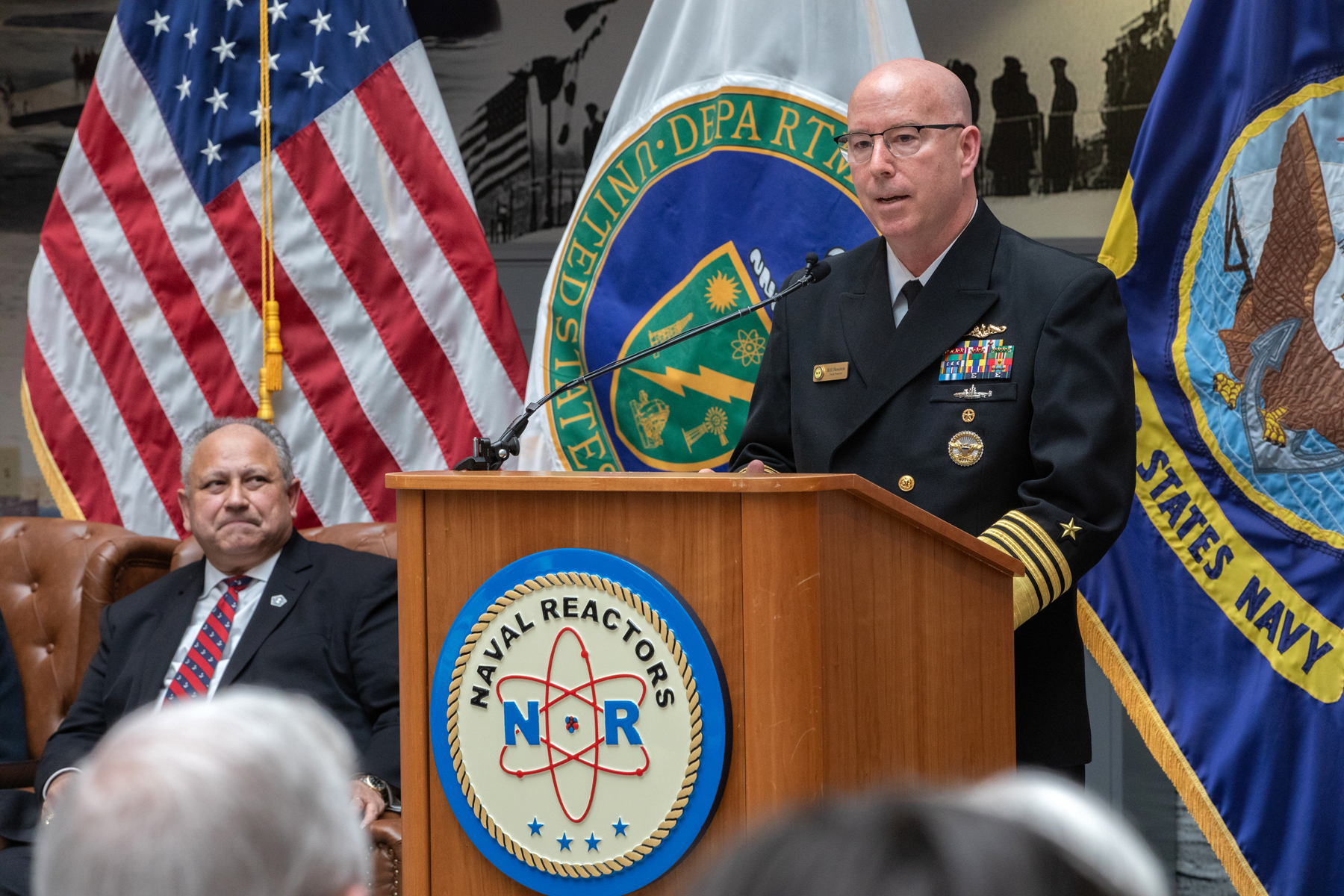
Adm. William J. Houston (right), the new Naval Reactors director, at his change of command ceremony, 10 January 2024.

The standard tour length for most four-star positions is three years, bundled as a two-year term plus a one-year extension, with the following exceptions:

- The chairman and vice chairman of the Joint Chiefs of Staff serve for a nominal four-year term.
- Service chiefs of staff serve a nominal four-year term.
- The chief and vice chief of the National Guard Bureau serve for a nominal four-year term.
- The director of Naval Nuclear Propulsion serves for a nominal eight-year term.

All appointees serve at the pleasure of the president. Extensions of the standard tour length can be approved, within statutory limits, by their respective service secretaries, the secretary of defense, the president, and/or Congress but these are rare, as they block other officers from being promoted. Some statutory limits of tour length under the U.S. Code can be waived in times of national emergency or war. Four-star ranks may also be given by act of Congress but this is extremely rare.

== Retirement ==
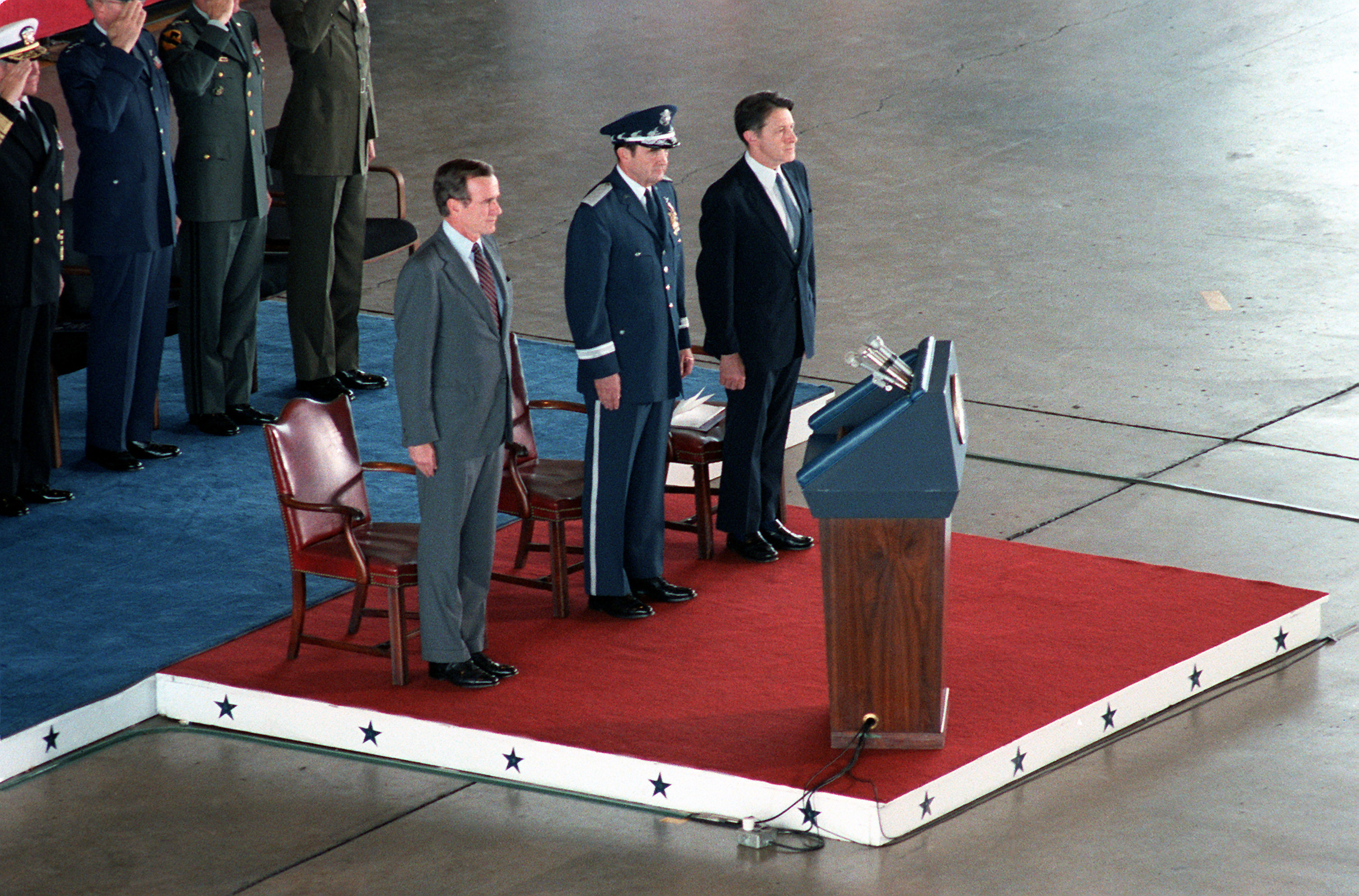
Gen. David C. Jones with Vice President George H. W. Bush and Secretary of Defense Caspar Weinberger during Jones' retirement ceremony on 18 June 1982.

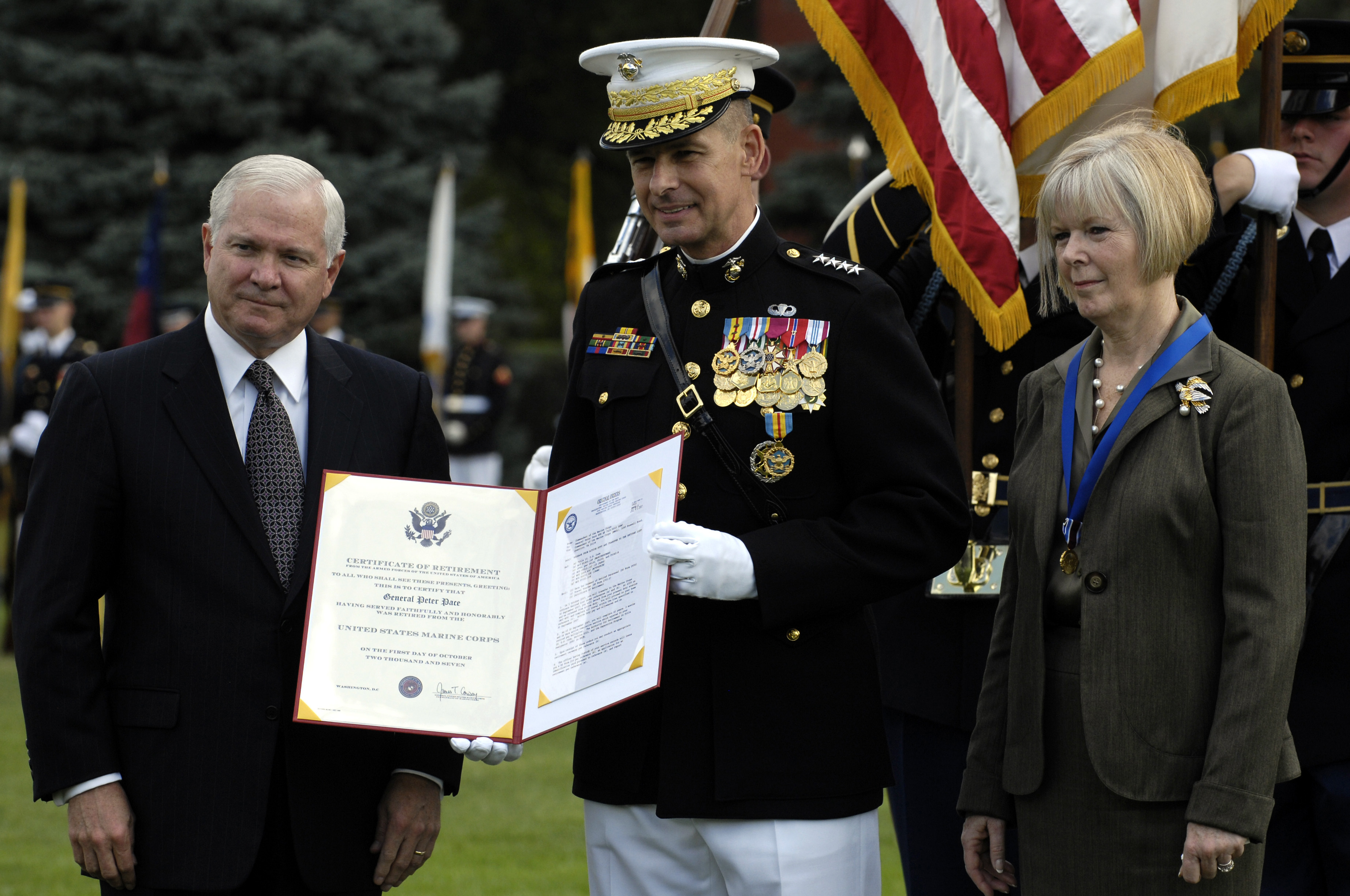
Secretary of Defense Robert Gates presents Gen. Peter Pace with his certificate of retirement as his wife Lynne looks on, 1 October 2007.

Other than voluntary retirement, statute sets a number of mandates for retirement. Regular four-star officers must retire after 40 years of active commissioned service unless reappointed to rank to serve longer. Reserve four-star officers must retire after five years in rank or 40 years of commissioned service, whichever is later, unless reappointed to rank to serve longer. Otherwise all general and flag officers must retire the month after their 64th birthday. However, the secretary of defense can defer a four-star officer's retirement until the officer's 66th birthday and the president can defer it until the officer's 68th birthday. Officers that served several years in the enlisted ranks prior to receiving their commission typically don't make it to the 40 years of commissioned service mark, because they are still subject to the age restrictions for retirement.

- For example, Admiral Michael G. Mullen was born on 4 October 1946; placed on active duty in 1968 and promoted to admiral on 23 August 2003. Ordinarily, he would have been expected to retire at the end of his four-year term as chief of naval operations in 2008 after 40 years of service. Instead, he was reappointed as an admiral and appointed as chairman of the Joint Chiefs of Staff on 1 October 2007. He retired from the Navy after serving two, two-year terms as chairman on 1 October 2011, at the age of 65 with 43 years of service and eight years in rank.
- General James F. Amos was born on 12 November 1946; placed on active duty in 1970 and promoted to general on 3 July 2008. Ordinarily, he would have been expected to retire at the end of his two-year term as assistant commandant of the Marine Corps in 2010 after 40 years of service. Instead, he was reappointed as a general and appointed as commandant of the Marine Corps on 22 October 2010. He retired from the Marine Corps after completing his four-year term as commandant on 17 October 2014, at the age of 67 with 44 years of service and six years in rank.
- General Frank J. Grass was born on 19 May 1951; enlisted in the Missouri Army National Guard in October 1969 and received his commission in 1981. He was appointed as a general in the active duty reserves and assigned as chief of the National Guard Bureau on 7 September 2012. He remained on reserve active duty until he completed his four-year term as chief and retired from the Army on 3 August 2016, at 65 years of age with 35 years in commissioned service, 47 years of total service, and four years in rank.

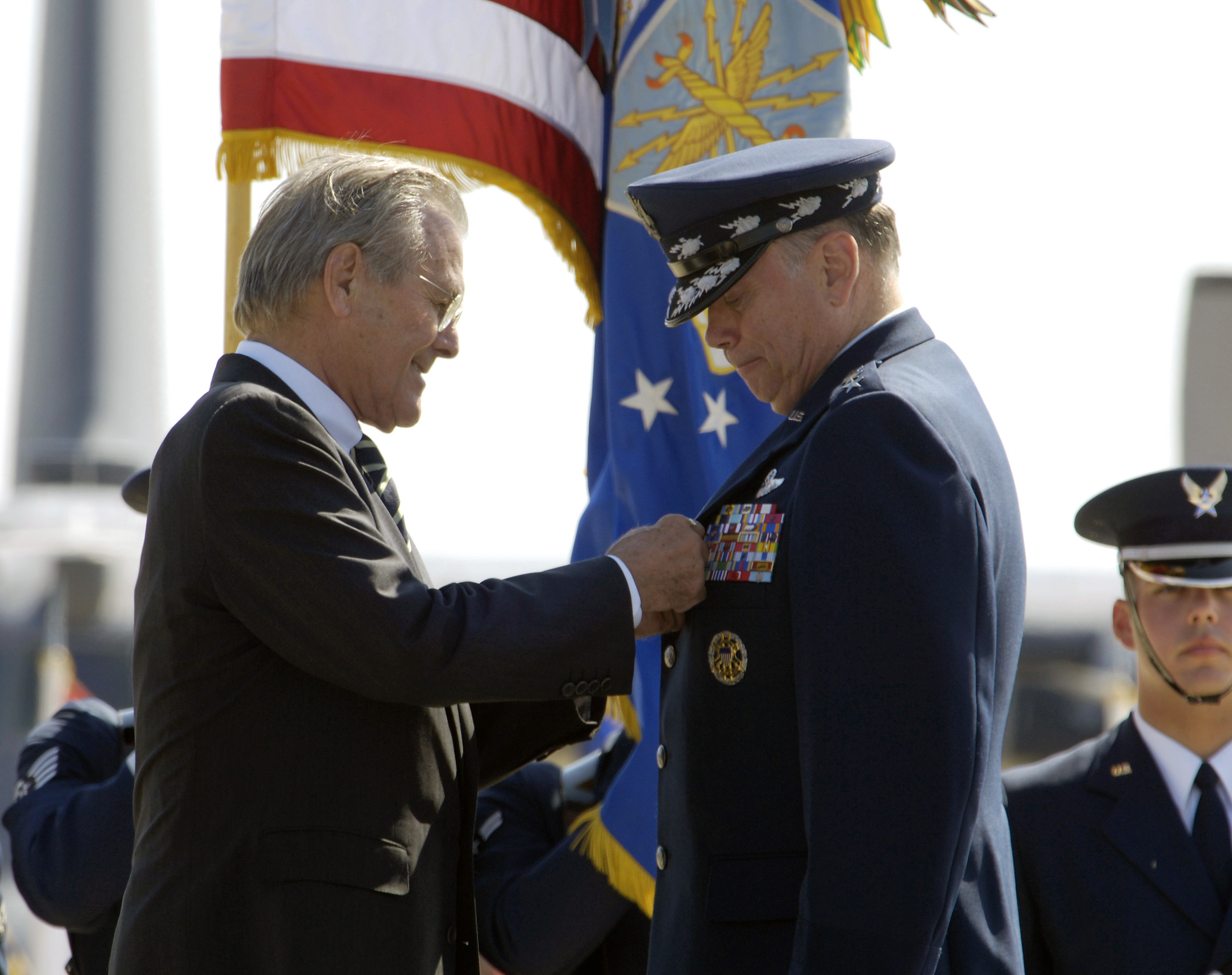
Gen. John P. Jumper is presented the Defense Distinguished Service Medal by Secretary of Defense Donald Rumsfeld during Jumper's retirement ceremony on 2 September 2005.

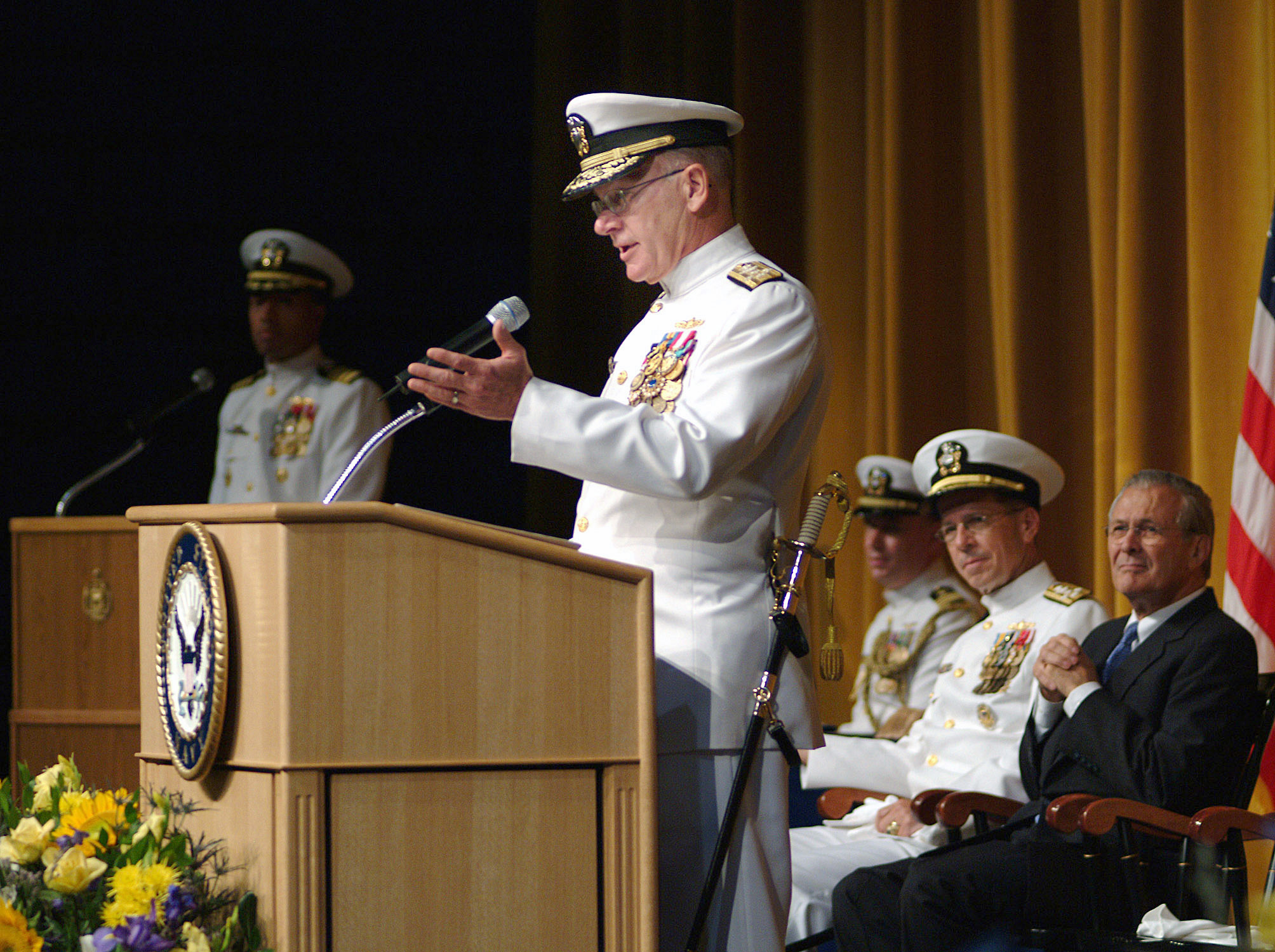
Outgoing Chief of Naval Operations Adm. Vern Clark delivers his final remarks during his retirement ceremony at the U.S. Naval Academy on 22 July 2005.

Senior officers typically retire well in advance of the statutory age and service limits, so as not to impede the upward career mobility of their juniors. Since there are a finite number of four-star slots available to each service, typically one officer must leave office before another can be promoted. Once an officer vacates a position bearing that rank, they have no more than 60 days to be appointed or reappointed to a position of equal or greater importance before they are expected to retire. Historically, officers leaving four-star positions were allowed to revert to their permanent two-star ranks to mark time in lesser jobs until statutory retirement, but now such officers are expected to retire immediately to avoid obstructing the promotion flow.

- For example, Vice Admiral Patrick M. Walsh was promoted to admiral and appointed as vice chief of naval operations in 2007. The incumbent vice chief, Admiral Robert F. Willard, was appointed as commander of the U.S. Pacific Fleet. The incumbent Pacific Fleet commander, Admiral Gary Roughead, was appointed as commander of U.S. Fleet Forces Command, whose incumbent commander, Admiral John B. Nathman, received no further appointment and retired at the age of 59, with 37 years of service and three years in rank.
- Lieutenant General Gary L. North was promoted to general and appointed as commander of Pacific Air Forces in 2009. The incumbent Pacific Air Forces commander, General Carrol Chandler, was appointed as vice chief of staff of the Air Force, while the incumbent vice chief, General William M. Fraser III, was appointed as commander of Air Combat Command, whose incumbent commander, General John D. W. Corley, received no further appointment and retired at the age of 58, with 36 years of service and four years in rank.

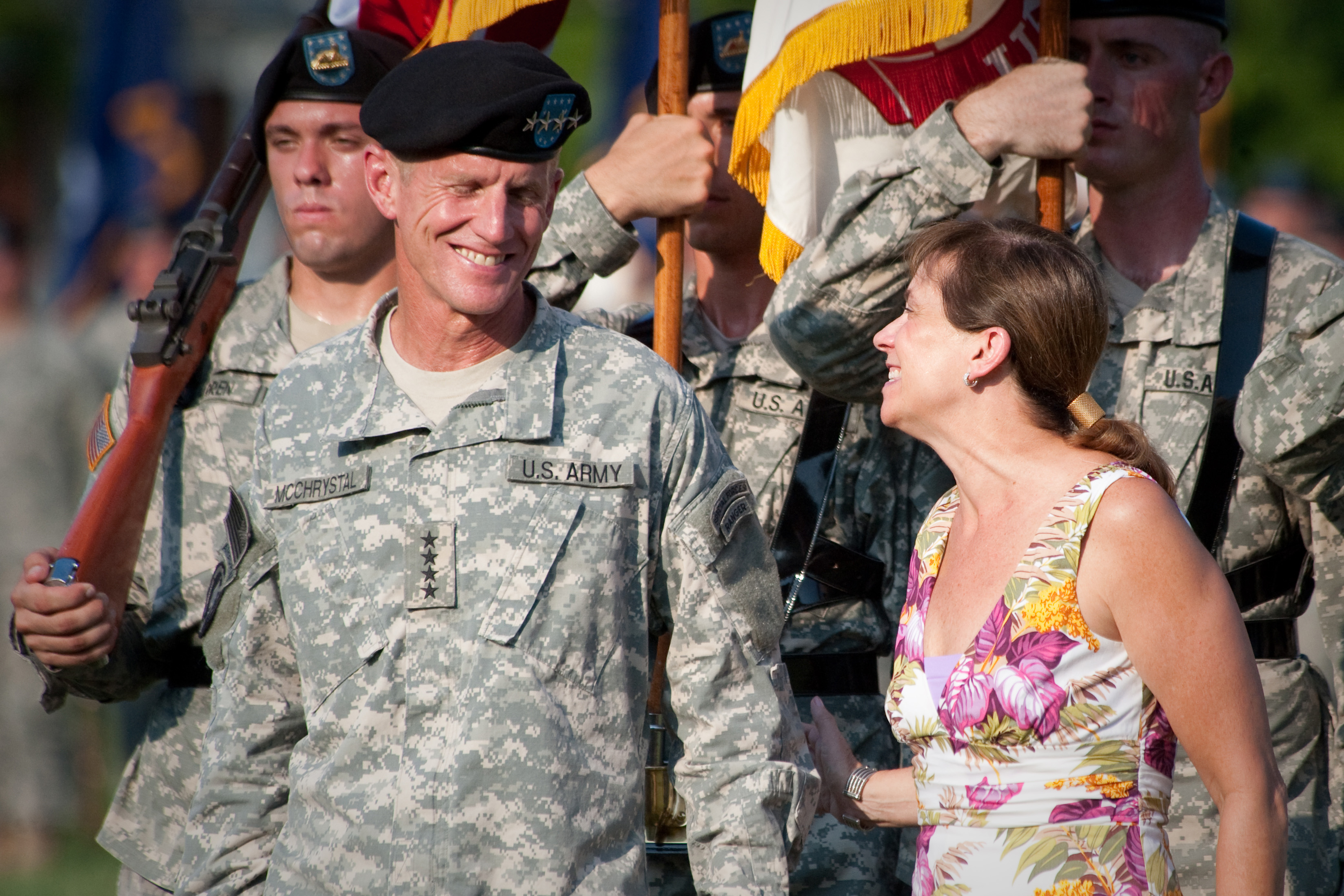
Gen. Stanley A. McChrystal and his wife, Annie, smile during his retirement ceremony in Washington, D.C., on 23 July 2010.

To retire at four-star rank, or pay grade of rank, an officer must accumulate at least three years of satisfactory active-duty service in that rank, as determined by the secretary of defense. The president and Congress must also receive certification by the secretary of defense that the retiree served satisfactorily in rank. The secretary of defense may reduce this requirement to two years, and the president may waive this requirement altogether, but only if the officer is not being investigated for misconduct. Four-star officers who do not meet the service-in-rank requirement will revert to the next highest rank in which they served satisfactorily for at least six months which is normally the three-star rank. Since three-star ranks are also temporary, if the retiree is also not certified by the secretary of defense or the president to retire as a three-star, the retiree will retire at the last permanent rank he or she satisfactorily held for six months. The retiree may also be subject to congressional approval by the Senate before the retiree can retire in grade. It is rare for a four-star officer not to be certified to retire in grade or for the Senate to seek final approval.

- For example, when removed from office after less than the statutory time in grade, Generals Frederick F. Woerner and Stanley A. McChrystal were retired as full generals as certified by the president and were not subjected to senatorial confirmation.
- Admirals Husband E. Kimmel and Richard C. Macke were not certified to retire at three-star or four-star grade, and retired as two-star rear admirals.
- General Kevin P. Byrnes had over two years in grade but was being investigated for misconduct, and retired as a lieutenant general.
- In 1972 General John D. Lavelle was relieved for misconduct and certified to retire as a lieutenant general, but was rejected by a Senate Armed Services Committee vote of 14 to 2 and retired as a major general; in 2010 he was nominated posthumously for advancement to general on the retired list based on newly declassified evidence; however, as stated above, the Senate did not vote on the nomination and let it expire at the end of the Congressional session.
- General Michael J. Dugan retired as a full general as certified by the president, but only after receiving approval from the Senate Armed Services Committee.
- After achieving the statutory time in grade, Admirals Frank B. Kelso II and Henry H. Mauz Jr. were retired as full admirals, but only after going through a full senatorial confirmation vote of 54 to 43 and 92 to 6, respectively.

Four-star officers who are under investigation for misconduct typically are not allowed to retire until the investigation completes, so that the secretary of defense can decide whether to certify that their performance was satisfactory enough to retire in their highest rank.

- For example, an investigation by the Department of Defense comptroller held Generals Roger A. Brady and Stephen R. Lorenz in their four-star commands for up to 13 months beyond their originally scheduled retirements.
- General William E. Ward relinquished his four-star command as scheduled, but remained on active duty in his permanent grade of major general pending an investigation by the Department of Defense inspector general, before being allowed to retire as a lieutenant general over a year after his original scheduled retirement.
- Admiral Samuel J. Locklear was held in his four-star command for months beyond his original scheduled retirement by the Navy's Consolidated Disposition Authority, while under investigation for the Fat Leonard corruption scandal before being cleared of any wrongdoing.

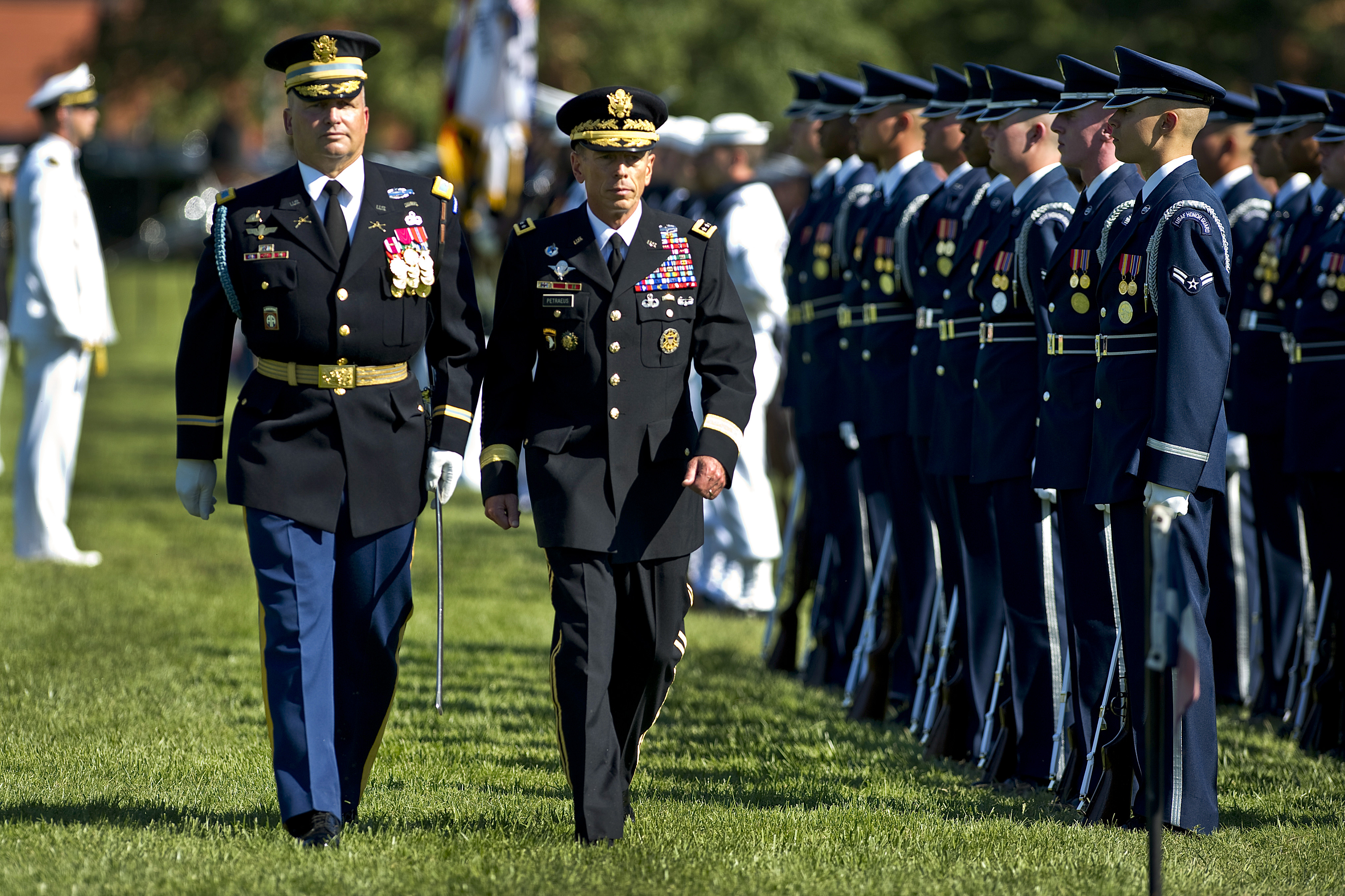
Gen. David Petraeus reviews troops at his retirement ceremony at Joint Base Myer-Henderson Hall, Virginia, 31 August 2011.

Furthermore, retired four-star officers may still be subject to the Uniform Code of Military Justice and disciplinary action, including reduction in retirement rank, by the secretary of defense or the president if they are deemed to have served unsatisfactorily in rank, post-retirement.

- General David H. Petraeus, who had retired from the Army as a four-star general on 31 August 2011, faced punitive action from the secretary of defense over four years past his retirement date for mishandling classified materials while serving as the commander of the International Security Assistance Force and U.S. Forces Afghanistan. He was allowed to retain his four-star rank in retirement with the recommendation of the secretary of the Army and strong support from members of the Senate Armed Services Committee.
- General Arthur J. Lichte, who had retired from the Air Force as a four-star general on 1 January 2010, received a letter of reprimand from the secretary of the Air Force for sexually assaulting a subordinate female officer on multiple occasions, over six years after his retirement date. The secretary of defense withdrew Lichte's certification of satisfactory service, and reduced his retirement grade to major general, which the Air Force determined was his last permanent rank he served in satisfactorily. Lichte could have faced charges under the Uniform Code of Military Justice; however, since the allegations were not reported or investigated until over five years past when they occurred, the statute of limitations bars having charges being brought up for prosecution.

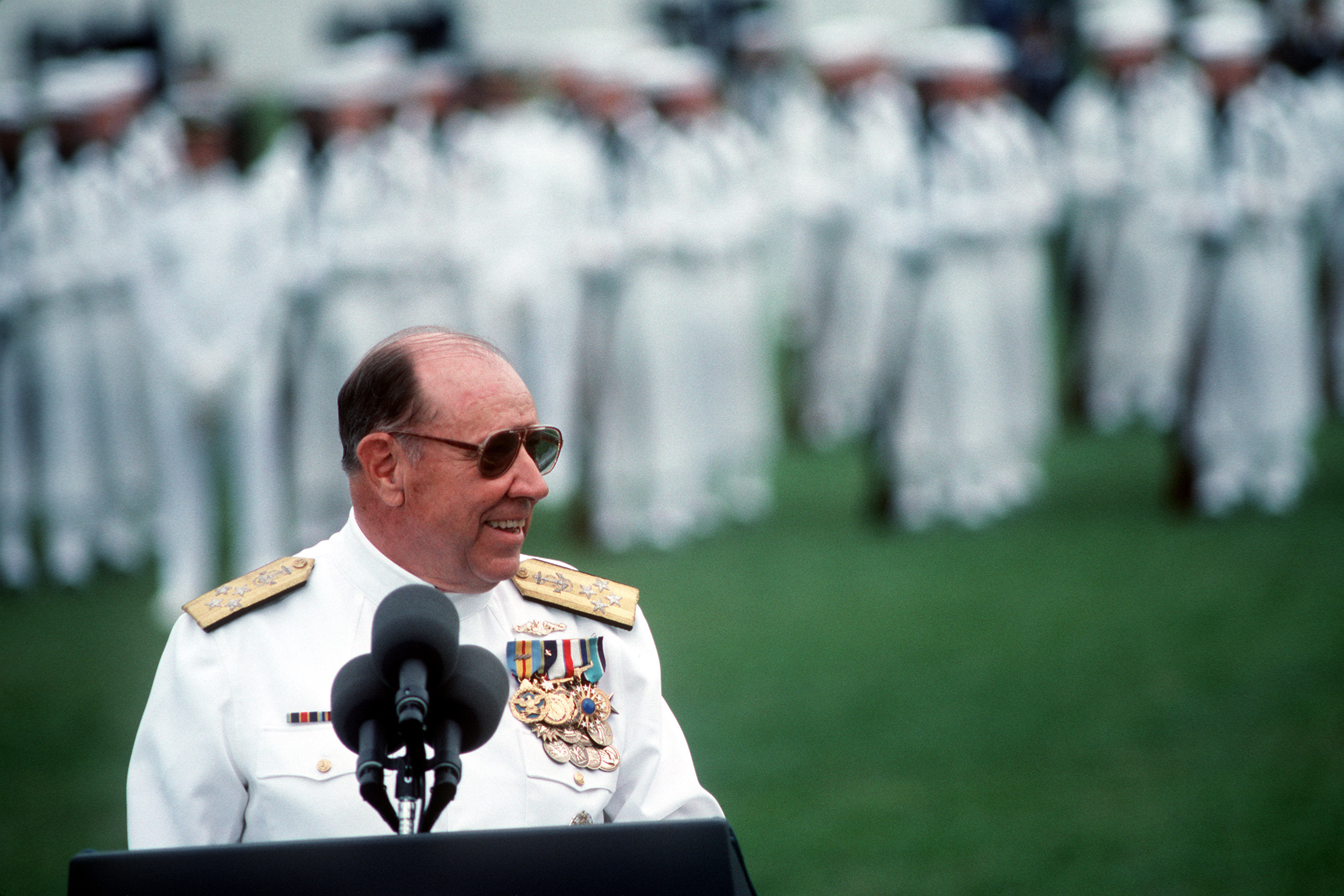
Adm. William J. Crowe Jr. shares a lighter moment with guests attending his retirement ceremony on 29 September 1989.

Four-star officers typically step down from their posts up to 60 days in advance of their official retirement dates. Officers retire on the first day of the month, so once a retirement month has been selected, the relief and retirement ceremonies are scheduled by counting backwards from that date by the number of days of accumulated leave remaining to the retiring officer. During this period, termed transition leave or terminal leave, the officer is considered to be awaiting retirement but still on active duty.

- For example, General Michael W. Hagee was relieved as commandant of the Marine Corps on 13 November 2006, and held his retirement ceremony the same day, but remained on active duty until his official retirement date on 1 January 2007.

A statutory limit can be waived by the president with the consent of Congress if it serves national interest. However, this is extremely rare.

- For example, the record for the longest tenure in any service is held by General Lewis B. Hershey who enlisted in the Indiana Army National Guard in 1911 at the age of 18. He was called up for federal active duty during World War I, receiving a commission in 1916, and subsequently transferred to the regular army at the end of the war. He served in active duty in the Army until the age of 80 before being involuntarily retired in 1973 after 62 years of continuous service.
- Admiral Hyman G. Rickover is listed as serving for 63 years in the Navy from 1918 to 1982. However, his service reflects a time when attending any military academy was considered active duty service due in part from World War I. In today's military rules and regulations, an officer who initially begins their career through a military academy does not begin their service until upon receiving their commission after graduation, even though they are subject to the Uniform Code of Military Justice while attending the academy.

== See also ==
- List of United States military leaders by rank
- List of United States Army four-star generals
- List of United States Marine Corps four-star generals
- List of United States Navy four-star admirals
- List of United States Air Force four-star generals
- List of United States Space Force four-star generals
- List of United States Coast Guard four-star admirals
- List of United States Public Health Service Commissioned Corps four-star admirals
- List of active duty United States three-star officers
- List of active duty United States Army major generals
- List of active duty United States Marine Corps major generals
- List of active duty United States rear admirals
- List of active duty United States Air Force major generals
- List of active duty United States Space Force general officers
- List of current United States National Guard major generals
- List of active duty United States senior enlisted leaders and advisors
- Staff (military)
