= List of active duty United States Space Force general officers =

U.S. Space Force generals

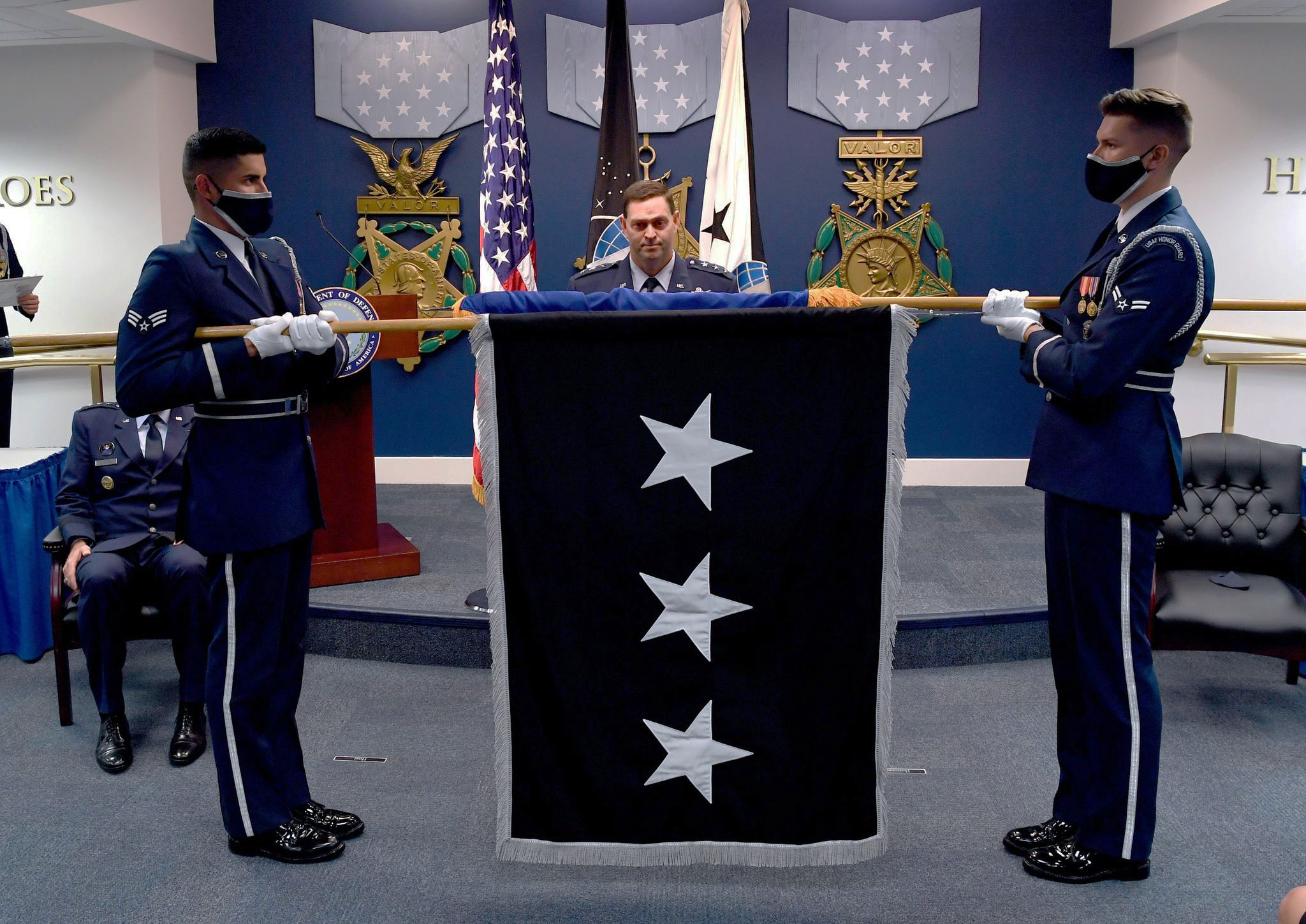
Lt Gen Saltzman being presented with the very first three-star flag in the U.S. Space Force during his promotion, 14 August 2020.

This is a list of active duty United States Space Force general officers. There are 33 active duty general officers in the U.S. Space Force: four generals, five lieutenant generals, nine major generals, and 15 brigadier generals. Among the 33, 26 of them serve in positions in the Space Force, while seven serve in joint positions. All of them transferred from the United States Air Force. Space Force general officers, like in other U.S. armed services, are nominated by the president of the United States and confirmed by the Senate.

== List of generals ==
U.S. Space Force general flag

No.	Portrait	Name	Date of rank	Current position	Ref
1	Michael A. Guetlein	Michael Guetlein	21 December 2023	Direct Reporting Program Manager, Office of Golden Dome for America	
2	Stephen N. Whiting	Stephen Whiting	10 January 2024	Commander, United States Space Command	
3	Shawn N. Bratton	Shawn Bratton	31 July 2025	Vice Chief of Space Operations	
4	Douglas A. Schiess	Douglas Schiess	3 September 2026	Chief of Space Operations	

== List of lieutenant generals ==
U.S. Space Force lieutenant general flag

No.	Portrait	Name	Date of rank	Current position	Ref
1	Philip A. Garrant	Philip Garrant	2 August 2022	Commander, Space Systems Command	
2	David N. Miller Jr.	David N. Miller	9 January 2024	Deputy Chief of Space Operations for Strategy, Plans, Programs, and Requirements	
3	Steven P. Whitney	Steven P. Whitney	30 October 2025	Director, Force Structure, Resources, and Assessment, Joint Staff	
4	Gregory J. Gagnon	Gregory Gagnon	3 November 2025	Commander, U.S. Space Force Combat Forces Command	
5	Dennis O. Bythewood	Dennis Bythewood	4 November 2025	Commander, United States Space Forces – Space and Combined Joint Space Force Component Commander, United States Space Command	

== List of major generals ==
U.S. Space Force major general flag

No.	Portrait	Name	Date of rank	Current position	Ref
1	Christopher S. Povak	Christopher Povak	29 September 2022	In transit	
2	Stephen G. Purdy Jr.	Stephen G. Purdy	1 December 2022	Portfolio Acquisition Executive, Advanced Capabilities (PAE-AC) and Senior Advisor to the Secretary of the Air Force for Space Acquisition	
3	D. Jason Cothern	D. Jason Cothern	6 December 2023	Deputy Director and Acting Director for Test, Missile Defense Agency	
4	James E. Smith	James E. Smith	21 June 2024	Commander, Space Training and Readiness Command	
5	Anthony J. Mastalir	Anthony Mastalir	25 July 2025	Director of Global Space Operations, United States Space Command	
6	Brian D. Sidari	Brian Sidari	3 November 2025	Deputy Chief of Space Operations for Intelligence	
7	Robert J. Hutt	Robert Hutt	3 November 2025	Senior Military Assistant to the United States Deputy Secretary of Defense	
8	Kristen L. Panzenhagen	Kristin Panzenhagen	30 July 2026	Military Deputy, Assistant Secretary of the Air Force for Space Acquisition and Integration	
9	Matthew S. Cantore	Matthew Cantore	26 September 2026	Director of Staff	

== List of brigadier generals ==
U.S. Space Force brigadier general flag

No.	Portrait	Name	Date of rank	Current position	Ref
1	Brian A. Denaro	Brian Denaro	1 February 2024	Commander, United States Space Forces – Indo-Pacific	
2	Zachary S. Warakomski	Shay Warakomski	7 June 2024	Vice Director for Joint Force Development, Joint Staff	
3	Robert J. Schreiner	Robert Schreiner	12 June 2024	Deputy Director, National Reconnaissance Office and Commander, Space Force Element to the National Reconnaissance Office	
4	Tyler N. Hague	Nick Hague	27 June 2025	Assistant Deputy Chief of Space Operations for Operations	
5	Nikki R. Frankino	Nikki Frankino	30 June 2025	Legislative Liaison of the United States Space Force	
6	Casey M. Beard	Casey Beard	30 June 2025	Deputy Commander, United States Space Force Combat Forces Command	
7	Todd J. Benson	Todd Benson	30 June 2025	Commander, United States Space Forces – Central	
8	Robert W. Davis	Robert W. Davis	18 July 2025	Deputy Director for Operations, Joint Staff	
9	Christopher A. Fernengel	Christopher Fernengel	4 November 2025	Commander, United States Space Forces – Europe and Africa	
10	Matthew E. Holston	Matthew Holston	4 November 2025	Director, Personnel Management Act Integration Office	
11	Jason N. Schramm	Jason Schramm	12 November 2026	Deputy Commander, Space Training and Readiness Command	
12	Clifford V. Sulham	Clifford Sulham	~September 2026	Deputy Director, Force Design and Analysis (SF/S9)	-
13	Ryan P. Frazier	Ryan P. Frazier	29 September 2026	Portfolio Acquisition Executive, Space-Based Sensing and Targeting (PAE-SBST)	
14	Eric J. Zarybnisky	Eric Zarybnisky	Frocked	Portfolio Acquisition Executive, Space Access (PAE-SA)	
15	Phillip A. Verroco	Phillip Verroco	Frocked	Commander, United States Space Forces – Northern	

== List of pending appointments ==
Portrait	Name	Current position	New assignment	Status	Ref
For General
David N. Miller Jr.	David N. Miller	Deputy Chief of Space Operations for Strategy, Plans, Programs, and Requirements	Commander, US Space Command	Received in the Senate and referred to the Committee on Armed Services 29 September 2026	
For Lieutenant General
Christopher S. Povak	Major General; Christopher Povak	In transit	Deputy Chief of Space Operations for Operations	Confirmed by the Senate; 10 November 2026	
Robert J. Hutt	Major General; Robert Hutt	Senior Military Assistant to the United States Deputy Secretary of Defense	—N/a	Confirmed by the Senate; 10 November 2026	
For Major General
Brian A. Denaro	Brigadier General; Brian Denaro	Commander, United States Space Forces – Indo-Pacific	—N/a	Confirmed by the Senate; 30 July 2026	
For Brigadier General
Mark C. Bigley	Colonel; Mark Bigley	Director, Plans and Programs, Office of the Deputy Chief of Space Operations for Plans, Programs, Requirements, and Analysis	—N/a	Confirmed by the Senate; 16 July 2026	
Jared A. Hoffman	Colonel; Jared Hoffman	Assistant Deputy Commander, Operations, Plans, Training, and Force Development, United States Space Force Combat Forces Command	—N/a	Confirmed by the Senate; 16 July 2026	

== History ==
=== Number of general officers ===
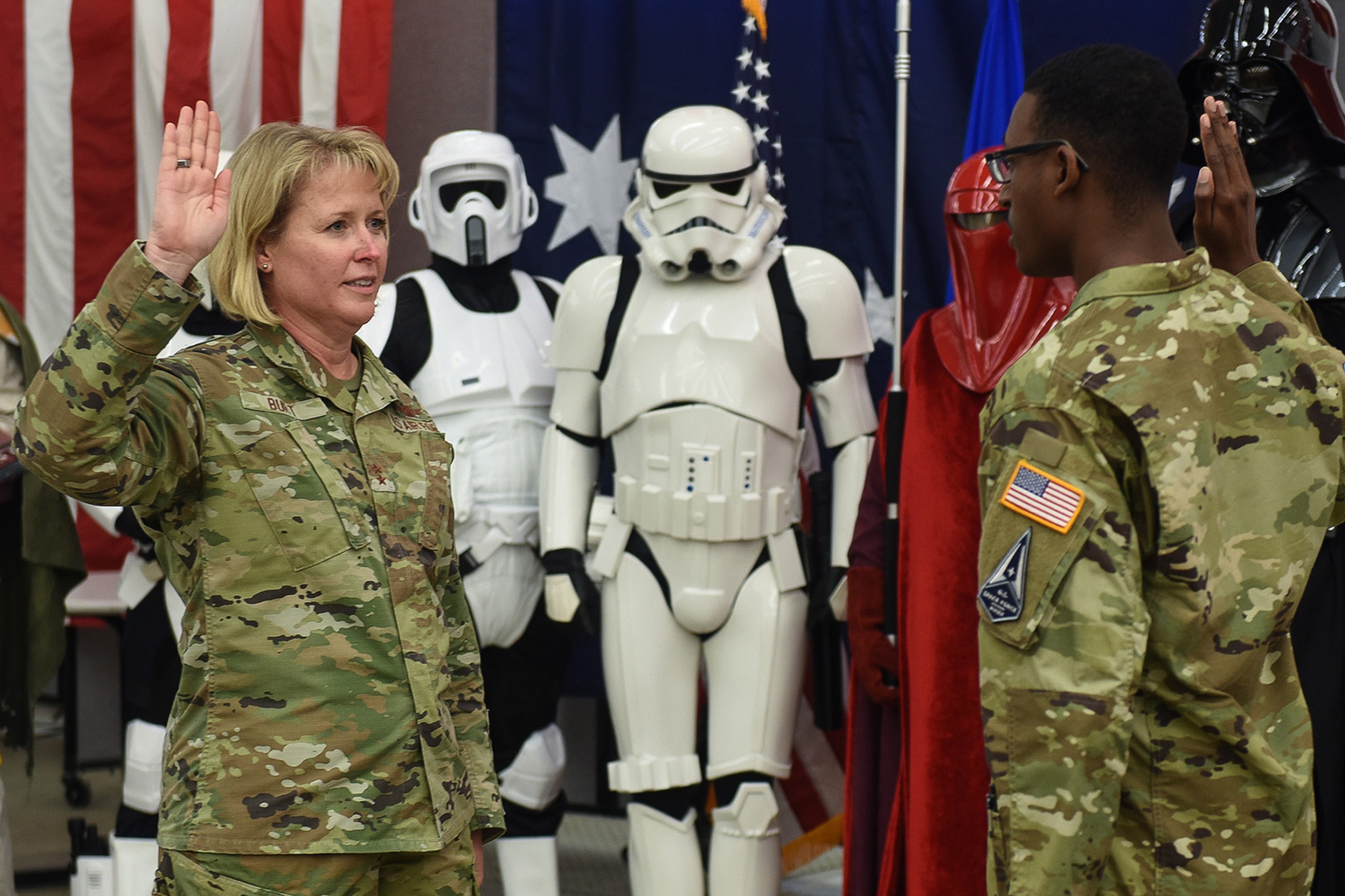
Major General Burt (left) is sworn into the Space Force, May 2021, transferring from the U.S. Air Force.

Before the establishment of the Space Force, the Space Force Planning Task Force considered two different scenarios or models for the number of general officers in the new service: the lean and demanding models. The lean Space Force model called for 41 general officers with three generals, six lieutenant generals, 12 major generals, and 20 brigadier generals. The demanding Space Force model, on the other hand, has 45 general officers with three generals, six lieutenant generals, 13 major generals, and 23 brigadier generals.

By August 2020, General John W. Raymond noted that there would only be 21 general officers in the Space Force. In 2022, this was codified by the James M. Inhofe National Defense Authorization Act for Fiscal Year 2023, specifying the number of statutory billets in each rank: two generals, five lieutenant generals, six major generals, and eight brigadier generals. It also required that a minimum of six Space Force general officers be assigned at joint duty assignments.

Asked by the United States Senate Committee on Armed Services whether the 21 general officer billets in the Space Force are sufficient, Lieutenant General B. Chance Saltzman, in his written statement in 2022, responded that it is not sustainable. He believes that it is not sufficient to sustain the two four-star posts in the service and effectively represent the Space Force in the Joint Staff and the unified combatant commands. He hopes to increase the number of general officers to 36: two generals, six lieutenant generals, 12 major generals, and 16 brigadier generals.

=== Transfers from the Air Force (2020–2021) ===
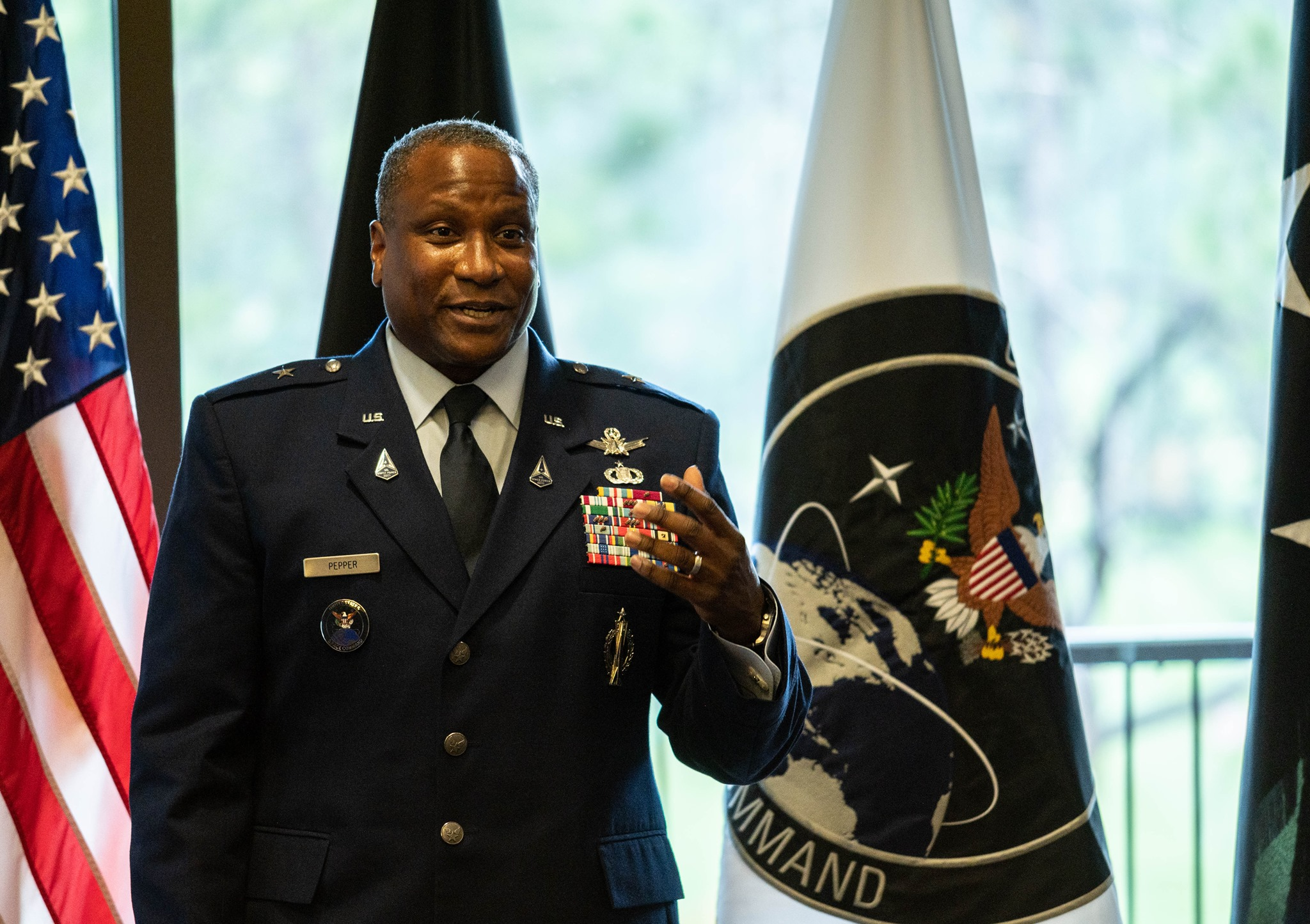
Brigadier General Devin R. Pepper, the first prior-enlisted and African American general officer in the Space Force, speaks during his promotion ceremony, 2021.

The Space Force was established by redesignating the United States Air Force's Air Force Space Command (AFSPC) as the United States Space Force on 20 December 2019. Thus, the very first general officers in the Space Force were general officers in the Air Force's space operations and space acquisitions career fields. Immediately after the establishment of the Space Force, then-AFSPC commander, General John W. Raymond, was appointed as the first chief of space operations. He then became the first member of the new service, and hence the very first general officer in the Space Force.

By July 2020, four U.S. Air Force major generals were nominated for transfer to the Space Force and promotion to lieutenant generals. On 14 August 2020, then-Major General B. Chance Saltzman transferred to the Space Force and was promoted to lieutenant general, becoming the service's lieutenant general and the first general officer promoted in the new service. Three days later, then-Major General Nina Armagno also transferred to the Space Force and was promoted to lieutenant general, becoming the service's first female general officer.

On 1 October 2020, then-U.S. Air Force lieutenant general David D. Thompson transferred into the Space Force and was promoted to general, becoming the first to hold the office of vice chief of space operations.

In April 2021, three U.S. Air Force major generals and six brigadier generals were nominated for transfer into the Space Force, all of them career space professionals working either space operations or space acquisitions. On May 7, 2021, Major General DeAnna Burt transferred to the Space Force, becoming the first major general of the service.

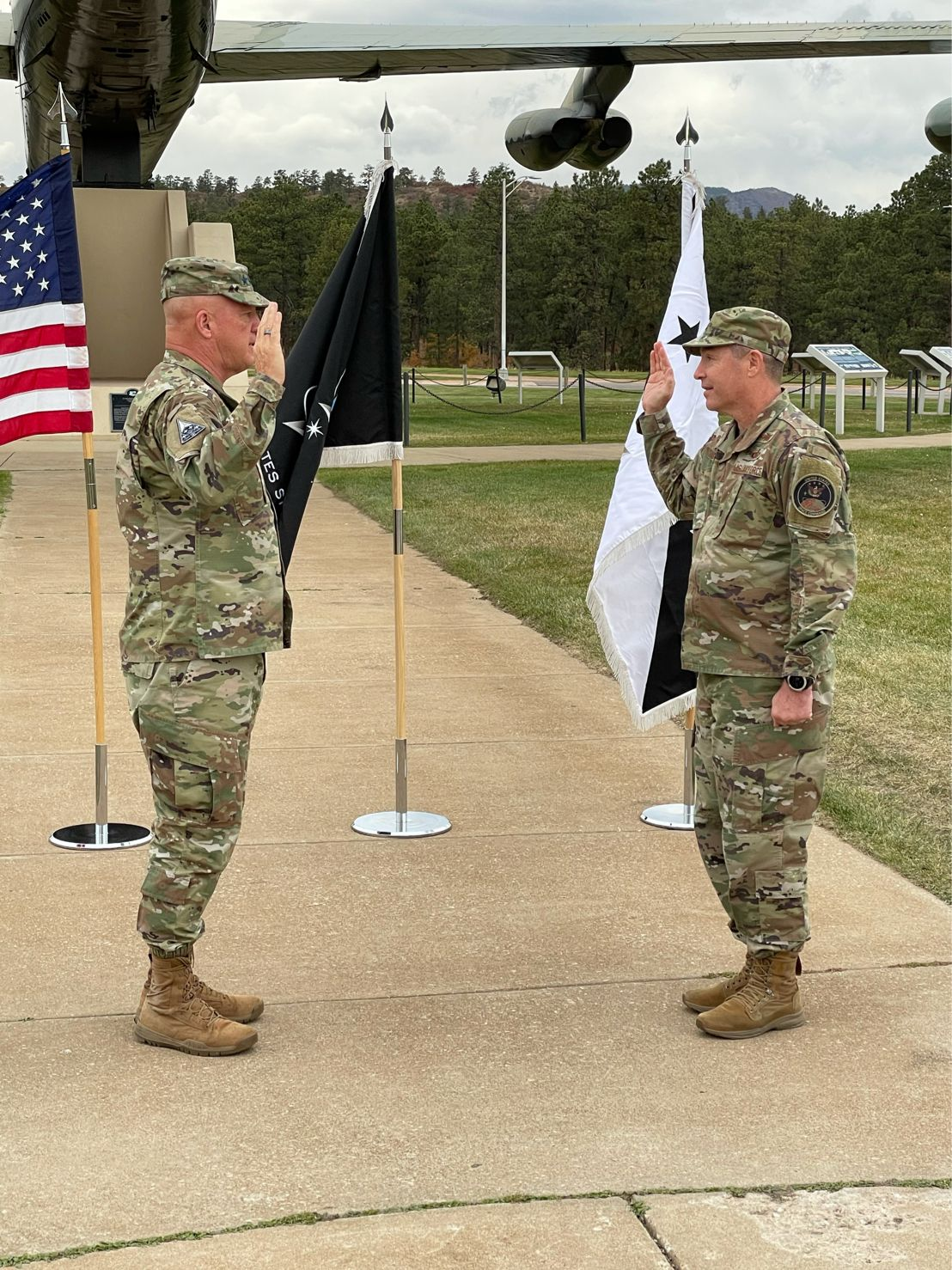
General Raymond (left) administers the oath of office to Brigadier General Gregory Gagnon, the first non-career space operations or space acquisitions officer general officer in the Space Force, during his first transfer ceremony, 2021.

On 19 October 2021, U.S. Air Force Brigadier General Gregory Gagnon transferred into the Space Force after volunteering. A career intelligence and cyber officer, he is the first general officer of the service who is a non-career space professional, or not coming from either space operations or space acquisitions career fields.

=== First direct promotions and expansion (2021–present) ===
The Space Force had transferred 17 general officers from the Air Force. By October 2021, after the transfers from the Air Force, the Space Force had 21 general officers: two generals, six lieutenant generals, three major generals, and 10 brigadier generals. This included the first officers promoted into general officer ranks since the creation of the service. In January 2021, four colonels were nominated for promotion to brigadier general, becoming the first Space Force general officers who were promoted directly as brigadier generals in the service.

In 2022, the number of major generals in the Space Force doubled from three to seven. Five colonels were nominated for promotion to brigadier general, bringing the total number of general officers to 24.

The National Defense Authorization Act for Fiscal Year 2026 increased the allowable number of Space Force general officers from 21 to 24, redistributing from the Air Force. It also codified five Space Force general officers on reserve duty.

=== Timeline ===
- Brigadier generals
- Major generals
- Lieutenant generals
- Generals

=== Historical firsts ===
- John W. Raymond, first general and first chief of space operations
- B. Chance Saltzman, first lieutenant general and the first general officer promoted into the Space Force
- Nina Armagno, first female general officer
- John E. Shaw, first general officer with a joint duty assignment
- DeAnna Burt, first major general
- Gregory Gagnon, first general officer from a non-space professional career field
- Dennis Bythewood, first existing Space Force officer promoted to general officer (Note: Not transferring from the Air Force as a general officer)
- William Liquori, first Space Force general officer to retire
- Shawn Bratton, first general officer to have come from the Air National Guard
- Devin Pepper, first prior-enlisted general officer
- Nick Hague, first astronaut general officer

== See also ==
- List of United States Space Force four-star generals
- List of United States Space Force lieutenant generals
