= Academy of Military Science (United States) =

The Academy of Military Science (AMS) was a six-week officer commissioning program of the United States Air Force. AMS was held at Maxwell Air Force Base in Montgomery, Alabama, with the purpose of training and commissioning Air National Guard officers only. AMS was originally located at McGhee Tyson Air National Guard Base, outside Knoxville, Tennessee. It was moved to Maxwell in 2009. The move was initiated by a question in 2006 from the Chief of Staff of the Air Force about the potential of a "shared common experience" at a single location among active duty, Guard and Reserve officer candidates.

Although the curriculum of AMS was very similar to Air Force Officer Training School (OTS), AMS differed from OTS in that it was only six weeks in duration. The primary reason for AMS being a six-week course instead of the traditional OTS nine-week course was that, on average, 85 percent of Air National Guard members have had prior military service when they arrived at the AMS course, versus about 40 percent of OTS students having had the prior experience. Another difference is that the AMS program doesn't operate on an upper-class/lower-class structure like OTS.

AMS is run by Air National Guard Detachment 12 for administrative purposes, but daily operation of AMS falls under the operational control of OTS. Det. 12 is a "total force" (staffed by all three Air Force components) organization with 25 positions within the academy's system, plus a position assigned to the Air University's Holm Center and another assigned as deputy commander of the Det. 12. AMS has been a total force organization since 1994. Air National Guard personnel serving on the staff come to OTS under a "Title 10" (federal) assignment that precludes them from having to leave Maxwell AFB for state service.

The memorandum of agreement the Holm Center commander and the Air National Guard Readiness Center commander was finalized May 26, 2009. That agreement specified how AMS would operate at Maxwell. The first AMS class at Maxwell began in October 2009. Each class includes approximately 125 students.

In March 2014, AMS switched to an eight-week course until it was shut down in January 2015, and fully integrated into Air Force OTS.
