= Deputy Chief of Space Operations =

US Space Force senior officers

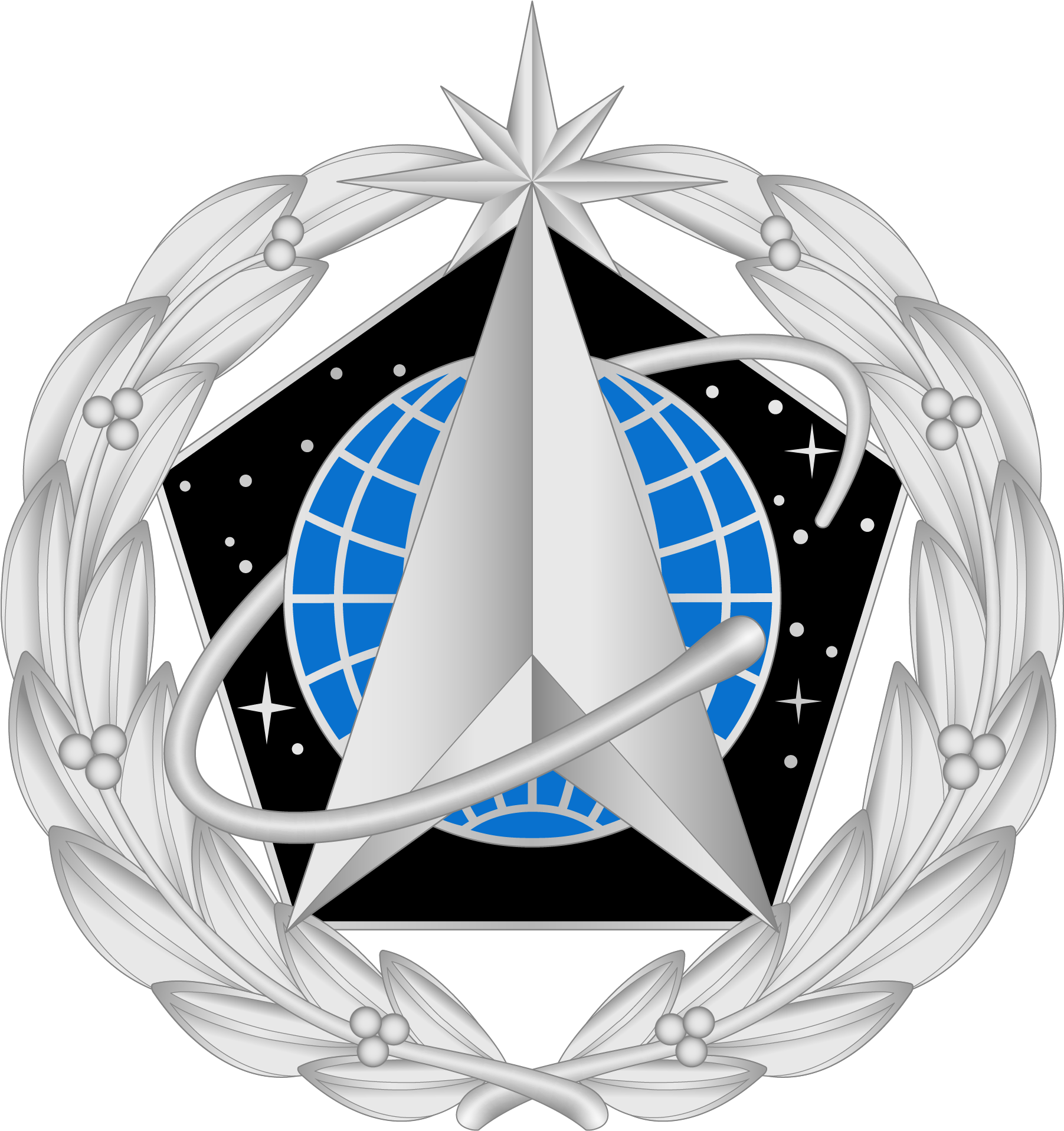
Space Staff identification badge

A deputy chief of space operations is a senior leadership position in the United States Space Force. There are five deputy chiefs of space operations in the Space Force, staffed either by a lieutenant general or a senior executive service personnel. They are the service's equivalent to the Army's and Air Force's deputy chiefs of staff, the Marine Corps' deputy commandants, and the Navy's deputy chiefs of naval operations. They are part of the Office of the Chief of Space Operations and hold office at the Pentagon.

The proposed organizational structure of the Space Force's headquarters was first revealed in a February 2020 congressional report, with directors instead of deputy chiefs of space operations. Intending to be "lean and agile", the service consolidated the normal nine functional areas into three directorates. In a June 2020 draft proposal, the position was renamed deputy chiefs of staff. On July 29, 2020, the first two deputy chiefs of operations were nominated. The Space Force adopted C-suite titles in designing their senior leadership positions.

== Deputy Chief of Space Operations for Human Capital ==
The deputy chief of space operations for human capital (Note: Also referred to as the deputy chief of space operations for personnel.) (S1 or SF/CHCO) is the chief human capital officer of the Space Force. The CHCO directs the Space Force's personnel management, which encompasses force structure analysis, personnel programs, civilian personnel, readiness, senior officer matters, quality force issues, equal opportunity, and family support.

=== Structure ===
- Deputy Chief of Space Operations: Katharine Kelley
  - Assistant Deputy Chief of Space Operations: Todd L. Remington
    - Director, Analysis and Systems (SF/S1A):
    - Director, Civilian Policy and Management (SF/S1C):
    - Director, Force Development (SF/S1D): Steve Turner Jr.
    - Director, Senior Leader Management (SF/S1L):
    - Director, Manpower (SF/S1M):
    - Director, Military Policy and Management (SF/S1P): Ruth Afiesimama
    - Director, Quality of Life & Resilience (SF/S1Q):
    - Director, Enterprise Talent Management (SF/ETM): Troy Lane
  - Senior Enlisted Advisor: CMSgt Caleb Lloyd

=== List of officeholders ===
No.	Deputy Chief of Space Operations		Term			Ref.
No.	Portrait	Name	Took office	Left office	Term length	Ref.
1	Patricia Mulcahy	Patricia Mulcahy (born c. 1958)	August 2020	3 June 2022	~1 year, 292 days	
2	Katharine Kelley	Katharine Kelley (born c. 1977)	~13 July 2022	Incumbent	~4 years, 102 days	

== Deputy Chief of Space Operations for Intelligence ==
The deputy chief of space operations for intelligence (S2) is the senior intelligence officer of the Space Force. The S2 has intelligence policy, oversight, and guidance of Space Force intelligence, surveillance and reconnaissance capabilities. The S2 is responsible for the Space Force Intelligence Community Element to the United States Intelligence Community and is the chief of the Service Cryptologic Component with delegated authorities from the Director of the National Security Agency. The position was originally the director of intelligence, surveillance, and reconnaissance under the COO. It was moved out as a separate position on 12 April 2023.

=== Structure ===
- Deputy Chief of Space Operations: Maj Gen Brian Sidari
  - Associate Deputy Chief of Space Operations: John J. Deeney IV
    - Director, Analysis and Production (S2A):
    - Director, ISR Partnerships and Integration (S2I):
    - Director, Warfighter Support (S2P): Col Marc D. Daniels
    - Director, ISR Resources and Requirements (S2R): Col John V. Otte
    - Director, Space Force Cryptologic Office (S2C): Luis Gonzalez
    - Director, Space Force GEOINT Office (S2G):

=== List of officeholders ===
No.	Deputy Chief of Space Operations		Term			Ref.
No.	Portrait	Name	Took office	Left office	Term length	Ref.
1	Leah Lauderback	Major General; Leah Lauderback (born 1971)	~August 2020	July 2022	~1 year, 334 days	
2	Gregory Gagnon	Major General; Gregory Gagnon (born 1972)	July 2022	24 July 2025	~3 years, 9 days	
3	Brian Sidari	Major General; Brian Sidari (born 1973)	24 July 2025	Incumbent	1 year, 91 days	-

== Deputy Chief of Space Operations for Operations ==
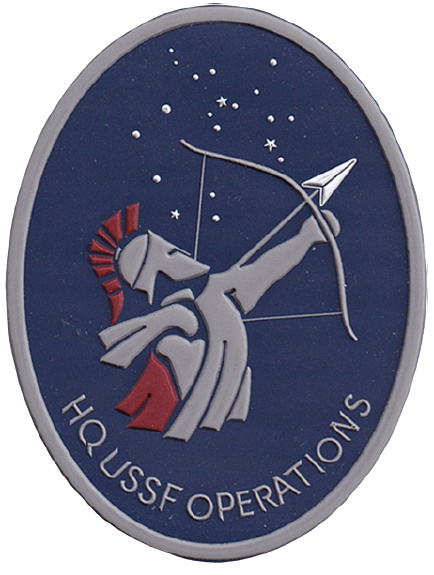
Chief Operations Office emblem

The deputy chief of space operations for operations (S3/4/7/10 or SF/COO) is the chief operations officer of the Space Force. The COO has overall responsibility for the Space Force's operations, sustainment, cyber, and nuclear operations. The position used to be deputy chief of space operations for operations, cyber, and nuclear until 2025 when the cyber function was transferred to the deputy chief of space operations for cyber and data.

=== Structure ===
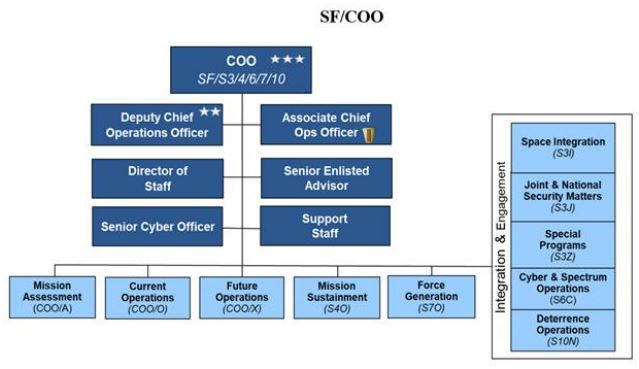
Chief Operations Office organizational chart

- Deputy Chief of Space Operations: Lt Gen Douglas Schiess
  - Senior Enlisted Advisor: CMSgt Amber A. Abramowski
  - Assistant Deputy Chief of Space Operations: Brig Gen Nick Hague
  - Associate Deputy Chief of Space Operations: Kathryn Kolbe
  - Director of Staff: Karl D. Hebert
  - Senior Cyber Officer:
    - Director, Force Assessment (COO/S3A): Col Stephan Cummings
    - Director, Current Operations (COO/S33): Col Mia L. Walsh
    - Director, Future Operations (COO/S35): Col Evan J. Briggs
    - Director, Training (S3T): Col Joseph Tobin
    - Director, Joint and National Security Council Matters (S3J): Col Jeremy Nutz
    - Director, Special Programs (S3Z): Mr. Roberto Colon
    - Director, Mission Sustainment (S4O): Col Marcia Quigley
    - Director, Force Generation (S7O): Col Timothy C. Sheehan
    - Director, Deterrence Operations (S3N):

=== List of officeholders ===
No.	Deputy Chief of Space Operations		Term			Ref.
No.	Portrait	Name	Took office	Left office	Term length	Ref.
1	B. Chance Saltzman	Lieutenant General; B. Chance Saltzman (born 1969)	7 August 2020	2 November 2022	2 years, 87 days	
-	Troy Endicott	Brigadier General; Troy Endicott (born 1971); Acting	2 November 2022	1 December 2022	29 days	
2	DeAnna Burt	Lieutenant General; DeAnna Burt (born 1969)	1 December 2022	14 August 2025	2 years, 256 days	
-	Shay Warakomski	Brigadier General; Shay Warakomski (born 1975); Acting	14 August 2025	September 2025	~32 days	-
-	Nick Hague	Brigadier General; Nick Hague (born 1975); Acting	September 2025	4 November 2025	~50 days	-
3	Douglas Schiess	Lieutenant General; Douglas Schiess (born 1970)	4 November 2025	3 September 2026	303 days	
-	Nick Hague	Brigadier General; Nick Hague (born 1975); Acting	3 September 2026	Incumbent	~50 days	-

== Deputy Chief of Space Operations for Strategy, Plans, Programs, and Requirements ==
The deputy chief of space operations for strategy, plans, programs, requirements (S5/8 or SF/CSRO) is the chief strategy and resourcing officer of the Space Force. The CSRO has overall responsibility for the Space Force's strategies, requirements, and budget.

=== Structure ===
- Deputy Chief of Space Operations: Lt Gen David N. Miller
  - Assistant Deputy Chief of Space Operations: Jessica P. Powers
    - Director of Strategy, Futures, and Partnerships (S5S): Col Todd J. Benson
      - Chief, Futures and Intgeration (S5SB): Col Carl Bottolfson
      - Chief, Global Partnerships (S5SP): Col George B. Nuno
      - Chief, Strategy, Policy, and Plans (S5SS): Col William Sanders
    - Director of Operational Capability Requirements (S5R): Col Peter Mastro
      - Chief, Information Warfare and Mobility (S5RI):
      - Chief, Combat Power (S5RP):
      - Chief, Requirements Integration (S5RR):
    - Director of Plans and Programs (S8): Vacant
      - Deputy Director & Chief, Planning and Analysis (S8PX): Jason Sutherland
      - Chief, Resource Integration (S8PN): Ramon Ayoade
      - Chief, Programming (S8PS): Emil Garawan
  - Mobilization Assistant: Brig Gen Damon S. Feltman, USAF
  - Senior Enlisted Advisor:

=== List of officeholders ===
No.	Deputy Chief of Space Operations		Term			Ref.
No.	Portrait	Name	Took office	Left office	Term length	Ref.
1	William Liquori	Lieutenant General; William Liquori (born c. 1969)	7 August 2020	1 August 2022	1 year, 359 days	
2	Philip Garrant	Lieutenant General; Philip Garrant (born c. 1969)	2 August 2022	22 December 2023	1 year, 142 days	
3	Shawn Bratton	Lieutenant General; Shawn Bratton (born 1968)	22 December 2023	1 August 2025	1 year, 222 days	
-	Jessica P. Powers	Jessica P. Powers (born c. 1974); Acting	1 August 2025	3 November 2025	94 days	
3	David N. Miller	Lieutenant General; David N. Miller (born c. 1971)	3 November 2025	Incumbent	354 days	

== Deputy Chief of Space Operations for Cyber and Data ==
The deputy chief of space operations for cyber and data (S6) is the chief technology and innovation officer of the Space Force. Originally the deputy chief of space operations for technology and innovation, the position was redesignated as deputy chief of space operations for cyber and data on 19 November 2024.

=== Structure ===
- Deputy Chief of Space Operations: Ms. Charleen Laughlin
  - Assistant Deputy Chief of Space Operations: Col Nathan L. Iven
  - Director, Science, Technology, and Research (STR): Joel B. Mozer
  - Director, Innovation and Digital Transformation (IDT): Col Stephen Landry
  - Director, Digital Infrastructure, Data, and Data Analytics (IDA):
  - Director, Analysis (S9): Gerald Diaz

=== List of officeholders ===
No.	Deputy Chief of Space Operations		Term			Ref.
No.	Portrait	Name	Took office	Left office	Term length	Ref.
–	Kimberly Crider	Major General; Kimberly Crider (born c. 1964); Acting	August 2020	May 2021	~273 days	
–	John M. Olson	Brigadier General; John M. Olson (born c. 1970); Acting	May 2021	September 2021	~123 days	
1	Lisa A. Costa	Lisa A. Costa (born c. 1964)	September 2021	June 2024	~2 years, 274 days	
–	Nathan L. Iven	Colonel; Nathan L. Iven (born c. 1974); Acting	June 2024	July 2025	~1 year, 30 days	
2	Charleen D. Laughlin	Charleen D. Laughlin	July 2025	Incumbent	~1 year, 100 days	

== Assistant Chief of Space Operations for Future Concepts and Partnerships ==
No.	Assistant Chief of Space Operations		Term			Ref.
No.	Portrait	Name	Took office	Left office	Term length	Ref.
1	Paul Godfrey	Air Marshal; Paul Godfrey	10 June 2024	Incumbent	2 years, 135 days	

== See also ==
- Director of Staff of the United States Space Force
- Space Staff
- United States Space Force
