= Leadership of Space Operations Command =

U.S. Space Force field commander

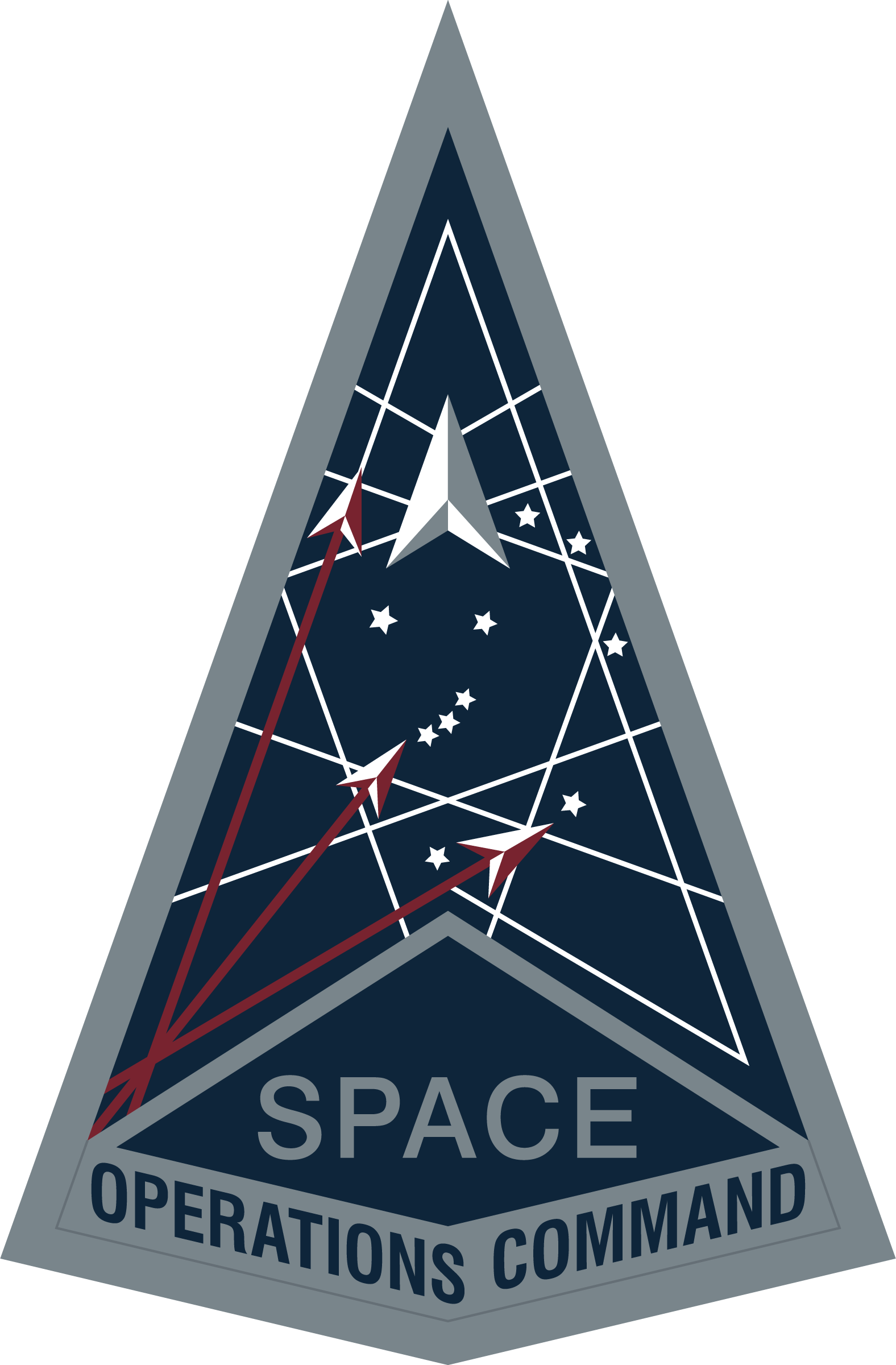
SpOC emblem

The commander of Space Operations Command is a lieutenant general who leads the field command that provide space forces to the United States Space Command and supports other unified combatant commands. A senior leader in the Space Force, it is only one of three field commanders and, of which, only one of two held by a lieutenant general.

Space Operations Command (SpOC) was established by redesignating the Air Force Space Command as Space Operations Command, which was redesignated prior as Headquarters, United States Space Force to serve in transitional capacity as the new service's headquarters. The commander of SpOC, thus, can be traced back to 1 September 1982, when General James V. Hartinger served as the first commander of Space Command.

Like any other three-star officer position in the U.S. Armed Forces, the commander of SpOC is nominated by the president of the United States and must be confirmed by the U.S. Senate.

== List of commanders ==
Commander of U.S. Space Force Combat Forces Command
- Flag of a Space Force lieutenant general

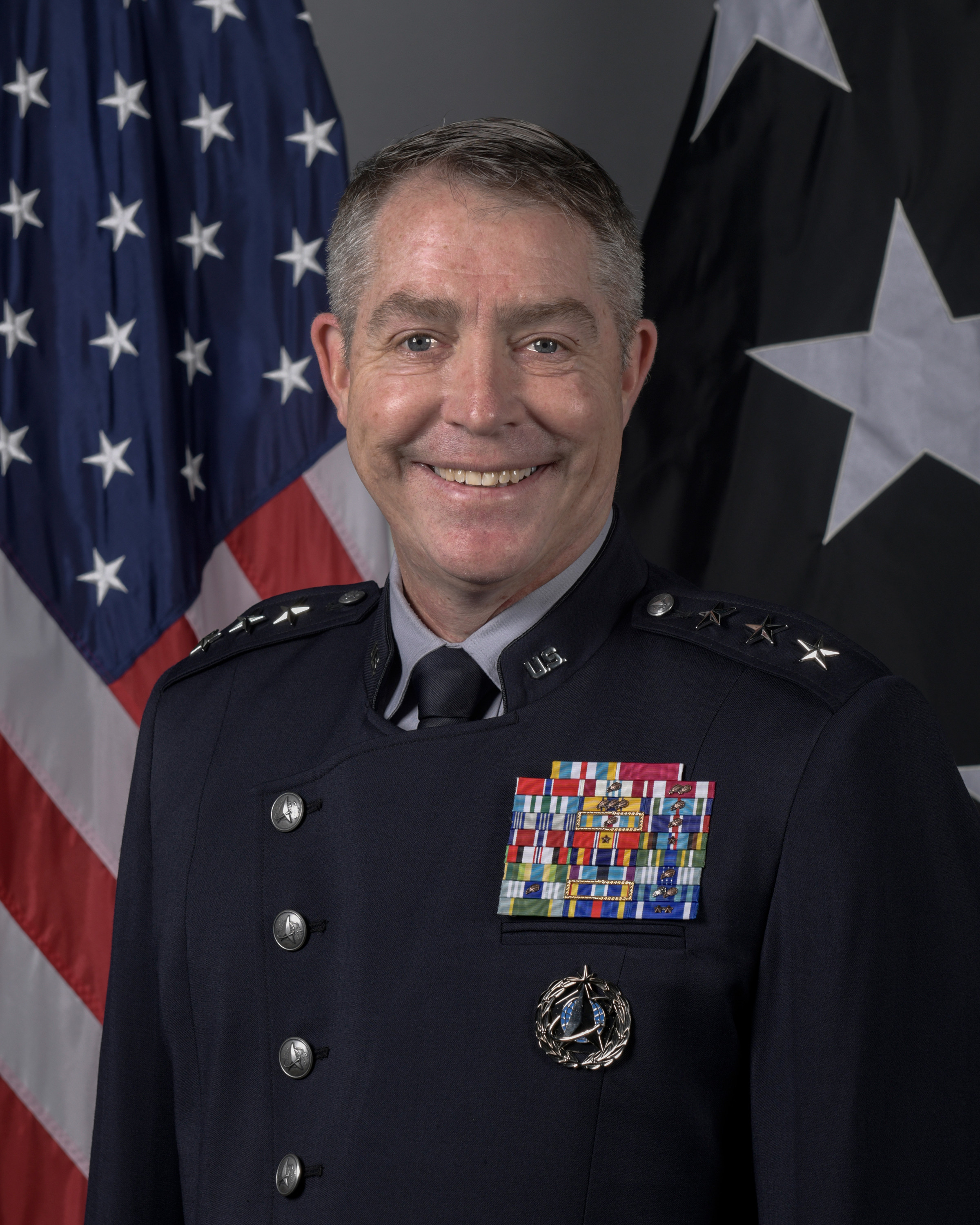
- Incumbent; Lieutenant General Gregory Gagnon since 3 November 2025
- United States Space Force
- Reports to: Chief of Space Operations
- Seat: Peterson Space Force Base, Colorado, U.S.
- Precursor: Commander, United States Space Force
- Formation: 1 September 1982
- First holder: James V. Hartinger
- Deputy: Vice Commander, Space Operations Command

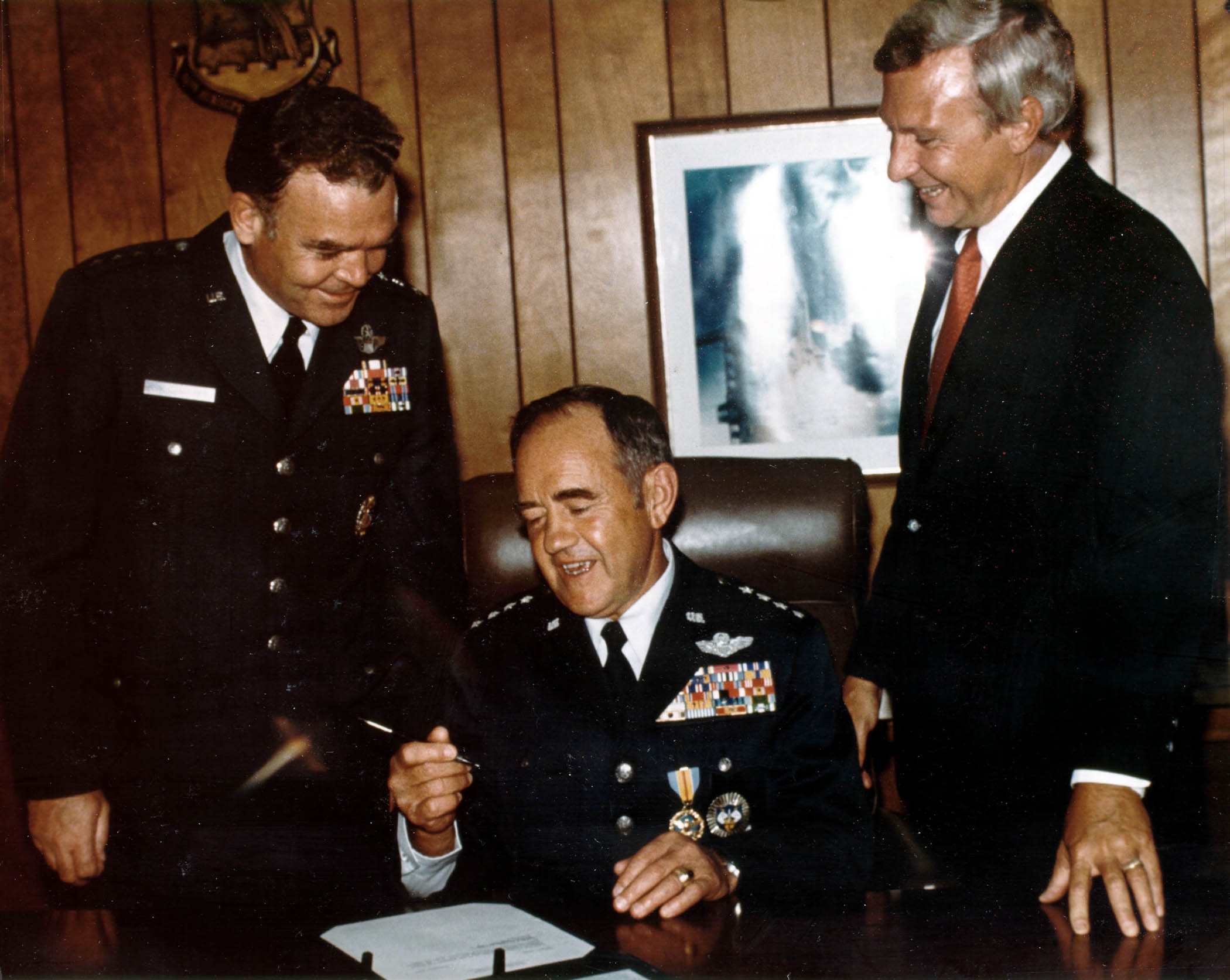
Gen O'Malley (left) and Secretary Aldridge (right) looks on as Gen Hartinger signs as the first commander of Space Command, 1 September 1982

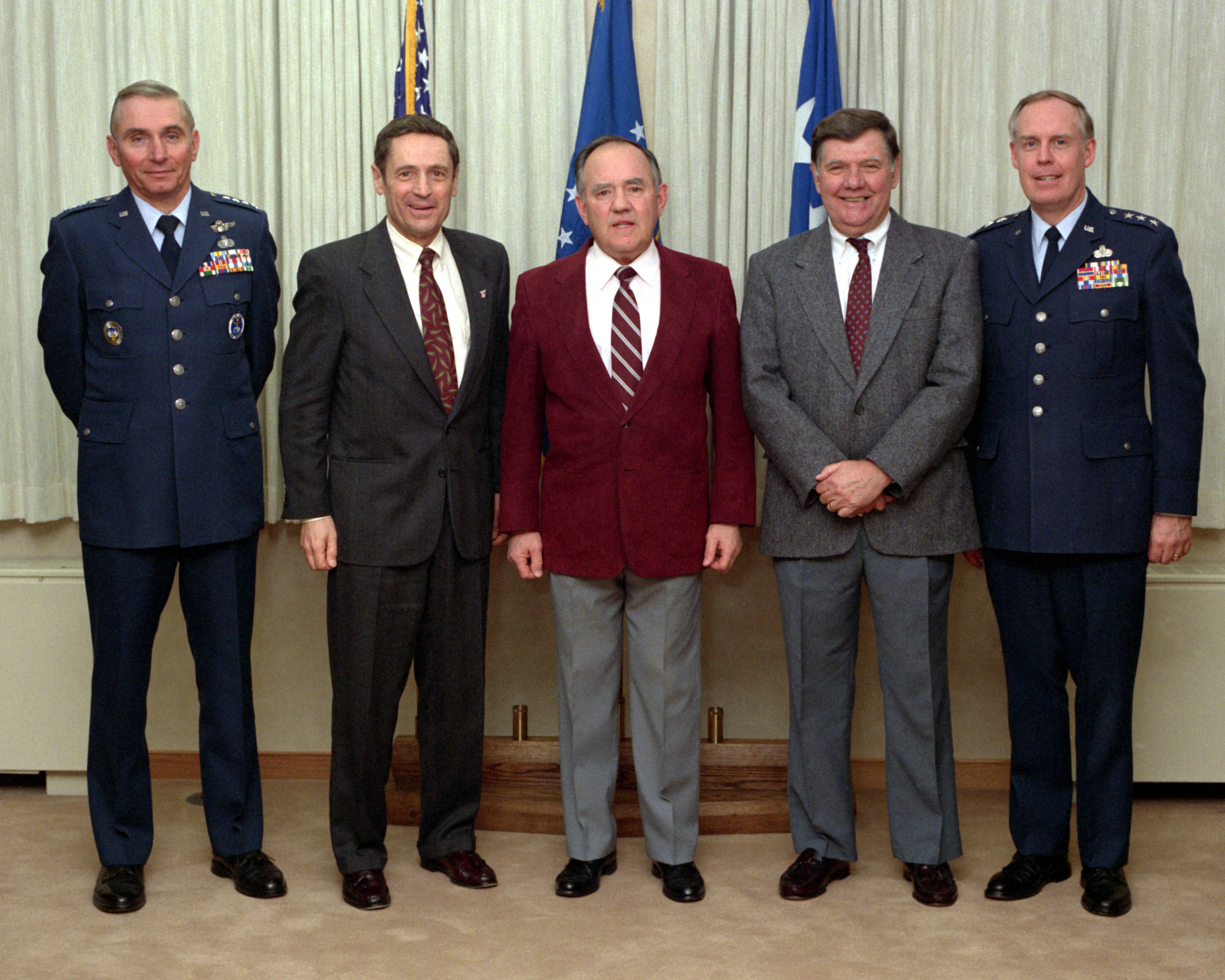
Left to right: Gen Kutyna, Gen Herres, Gen Hartinger, Maj Gen Padden, and Lt Gen Moorman, former and current Air Force Space Command commanders, gather in 1991

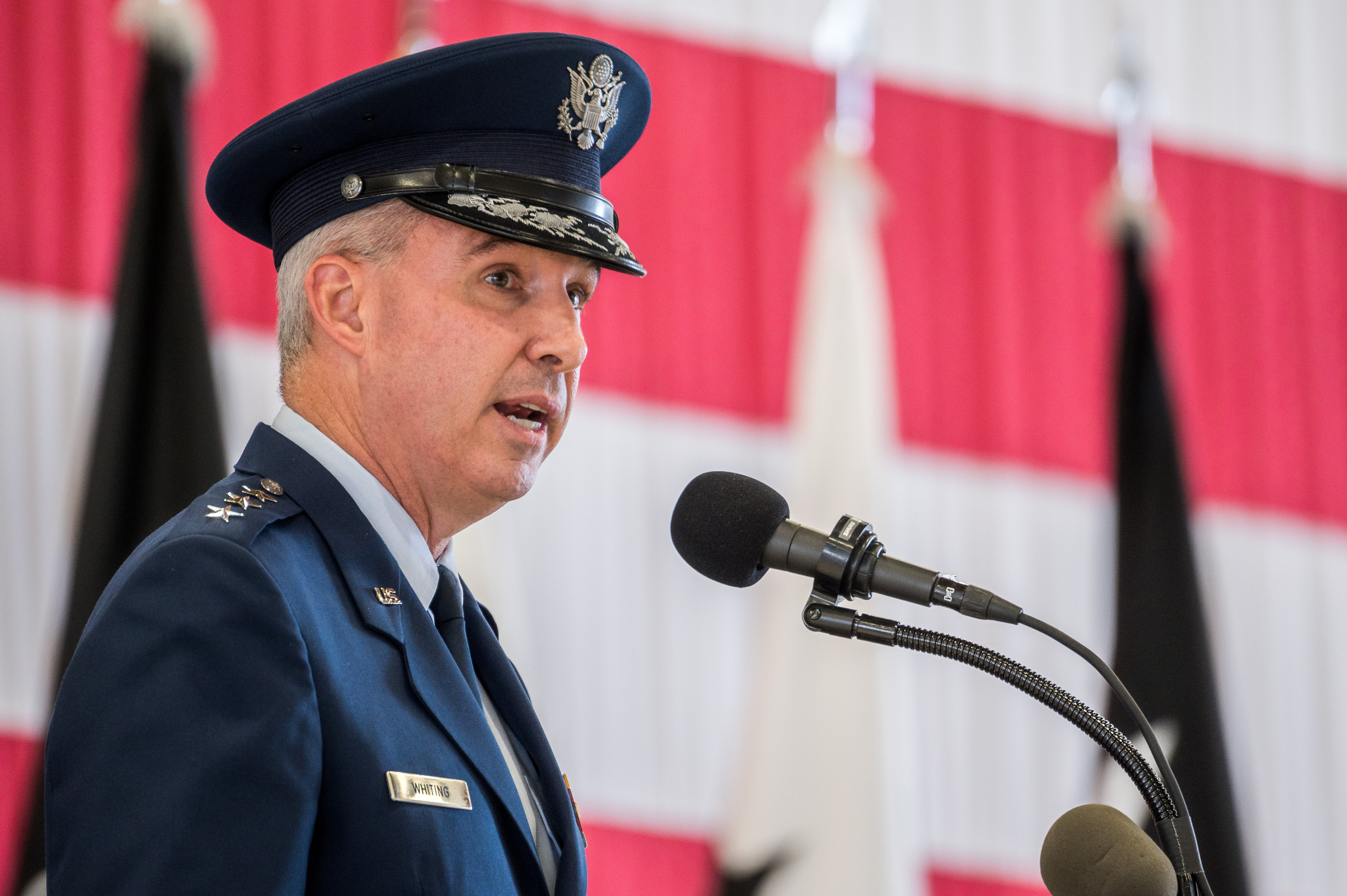
Lt Gen Whiting, the first commander of Space Operations Command, delivers remarks during the field command's activation ceremony, 21 October 2020

No.	Commander		Term		
No.	Portrait	Name	Took office	Left office	Duration
Space Command
1	James V. Hartinger	General; James V. Hartinger (1925–2000)	1 September 1982	20 July 1984	1 year, 323 days
2	Robert T. Herres	General; Robert T. Herres (1932–2008)	30 July 1984	15 November 1985	1 year, 118 days
Air Force Space Command
1	Robert T. Herres	General; Robert T. Herres (1932–2008)	15 November 1985	1 October 1986	320 days
2	Maurice C. Padden	Major General; Maurice C. Padden (1931–2015)	1 October 1986	29 October 1987	1 year, 28 days
3	Donald J. Kutyna	Lieutenant General; Donald J. Kutyna (born 1933)	29 October 1987	29 March 1990	2 years, 151 days
4	Thomas S. Moorman Jr.	Lieutenant General; Thomas S. Moorman Jr. (1940–2020)	29 March 1990	23 March 1992	1 year, 360 days
5	Donald J. Kutyna	General; Donald J. Kutyna (born 1933)	23 March 1992	30 June 1992	99 days
6	Chuck Horner	General; Chuck Horner (born 1936)	30 June 1992	13 September 1994	2 years, 106 days
7	Joseph W. Ashy	General; Joseph W. Ashy (born 1940)	13 September 1994	26 August 1996	1 year, 348 days
8	Howell M. Estes III	General; Howell M. Estes III (1941–2024)	26 August 1996	14 August 1998	1 year, 353 days
9	Richard Myers	General; Richard Myers (born 1942)	14 August 1998	22 February 2000	1 year, 192 days
10	Ralph Eberhart	General; Ralph Eberhart (born 1946)	22 February 2000	19 April 2002	2 years, 56 days
11	Lance W. Lord	General; Lance W. Lord (born 1946)	19 April 2002	1 April 2006	3 years, 347 days
–	Frank Klotz	Lieutenant General; Frank Klotz (born 1950); Acting	1 April 2006	26 June 2006	86 days
12	Kevin P. Chilton	General; Kevin P. Chilton (born 1954)	26 June 2006	3 October 2007	1 year, 99 days
–	Michael A. Hamel	Lieutenant General; Michael A. Hamel; Acting	3 October 2007	12 October 2007	9 days
13	C. Robert Kehler	General; C. Robert Kehler (born 1952)	12 October 2007	5 January 2011	3 years, 85 days
14	William L. Shelton	General; William L. Shelton (born 1954)	5 January 2011	15 August 2014	3 years, 222 days
15	John E. Hyten	General; John E. Hyten (born 1959)	15 August 2014	25 October 2016	2 years, 71 days
16	John W. Raymond	General; John W. Raymond (born 1962)	25 October 2016	20 December 2019	3 years, 56 days
United States Space Force
1	John W. Raymond	General; John W. Raymond (born 1962)	20 December 2019 (Note: With the creation of the Space Force, Air Force Space Command headquarters in Colorado remained working until the stand-up of Space Operations Command, serving in transitional capacity as Headquarters, United States Space Force.)	21 October 2020	306 days
Space Operations Command
1	Stephen Whiting	Lieutenant General; Stephen Whiting (born 1967)	21 October 2020	9 January 2024	3 years, 80 days
2	David N. Miller	Lieutenant General; David N. Miller (born c. 1971)	9 January 2024	3 November 2025	1 year, 298 days
United States Space Force Combat Forces Command
1	Gregory Gagnon	Lieutenant General; Gregory Gagnon (born c. 1972)	3 November 2025	Incumbent	350 days

== List of vice commanders ==
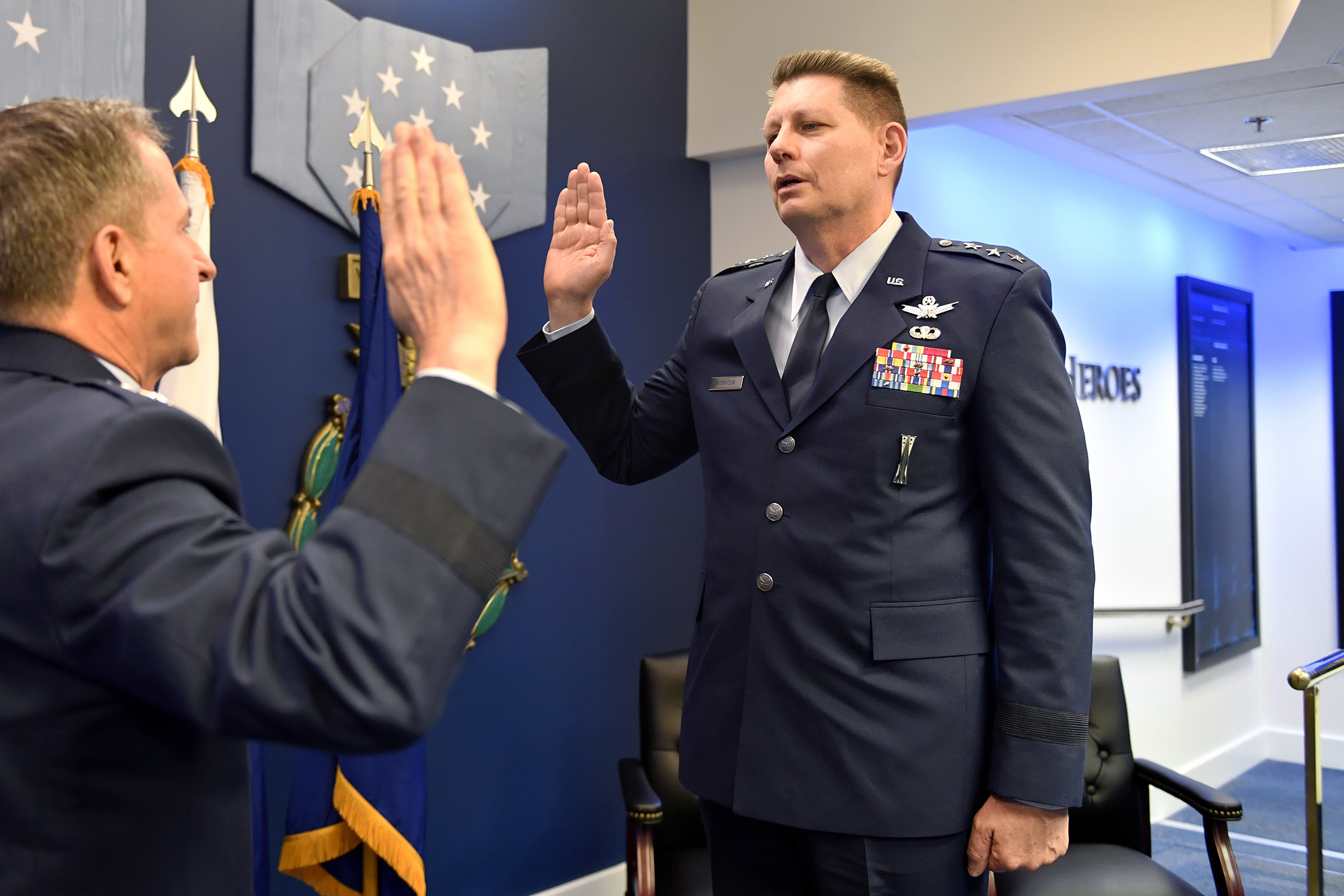
Gen Goldfein (left) administers the oath of office to Lt Gen Thompson (right) during the establishment of the Air Force Space Command's vice commander position, 4 April 2018

No.	Vice Commander		Term			Ref
No.	Portrait	Name	Took office	Left office	Duration	Ref
1	David D. Thompson	Lieutenant General; David D. Thompson (born 1963)	4 April 2018	21 October 2020	2 years, 200 days	
2	John E. Shaw	Major General; John E. Shaw (born 1968)	21 October 2020	16 November 2020	26 days	-
3	DeAnna Burt	Major General; DeAnna Burt (born 1969)	16 November 2020	22 August 2022	1 year, 279 days	
4	Douglas Schiess	Major General; Douglas Schiess (born 1970)	22 August 2022	6 December 2023	1 year, 106 days	
5	Devin Pepper	Brigadier General; Devin Pepper (born 1969)	6 December 2023	11 June 2024	~188 days	
6	Chandler Atwood	Brigadier General; Chandler Atwood (1978–2025)	11 June 2024	20 June 2025	1 year, 9 days	
7	Casey Beard	Brigadier General; Casey Beard (born c. 1979)	20 June 2025	Incumbent	1 year, 121 days	

== List of deputy commanders ==
No.	Deputy Commander		Term			Ref
No.	Portrait	Name	Took office	Left office	Duration	Ref
1	Maurice C. Padden	Major General; Maurice C. Padden (1931–2015)	July 1985	1 October 1986	~1 year, 78 days	
2	Ralph E. Spraker	Major General; Ralph E. Spraker (1933–2020)	1 October 1986	June 1989	~2 years, 257 days	
3	G. Wesley Clark	Major General; G. Wesley Clark (born 1932)	June 1989	April 1990	~304 days	
4	Jay W. Kelley	Major General; Jay W. Kelley (born 1941)	April 1990	March 1992	~1 year, 335 days	
5	Thomas S. Moorman Jr.	Lieutenant General; Thomas S. Moorman Jr. (1940–2020)	March 1992	July 1994	~2 years, 122 days	
6	Patrick P. Caruana	Lieutenant General; Patrick P. Caruana (born 1939)	August 1994	August 1997	~3 years	
7	Lance W. Lord	Lieutenant General; Lance W. Lord (born 1946)	August 1997	June 1999	~1 year, 304 days	
8	Donald G. Cook	Lieutenant General; Donald G. Cook (born 1946)	July 1999	June 2000	~1 year	
9	Roger G. DeKok	Lieutenant General; Roger G. DeKok (1947–2003)	June 2000	April 2002	~1 year, 304 days	
10	Robert C. Hinson	Lieutenant General; Robert C. Hinson	April 2002	August 2003	~1 year, 122 days	
11	Daniel P. Leaf	Lieutenant General; Daniel P. Leaf (born c. 1952)	August 2003	September 2005	~2 years, 31 days	
12	Frank Klotz	Lieutenant General; Frank Klotz (born 1950)	October 2005	August 2007	~1 year, 304 days	
13	Thomas F. Deppe	Major General; Thomas F. Deppe	August 2007	August 2009	~2 years	
14	Michael J. Basla	Lieutenant General; Michael J. Basla	August 2009	May 2012	~2 years, 274 days	
15	John E. Hyten	Lieutenant General; John E. Hyten (born 1959)	May 2012	August 2014	~2 years, 92 days	-
16	David J. Buck	Major General; David J. Buck	August 2014	August 2015	~1 year	
17	David D. Thompson	Major General; David D. Thompson (born 1963)	July 2015	July 2017	~2 years	-
18	Robert J. Skinner	Major General; Robert J. Skinner	July 2017	July 2018	~1 year	
19	John E. Shaw	Major General; John E. Shaw (born 1968)	August 2018	20 November 2019	~1 year, 97 days	
20	Stephen Whiting	Major General; Stephen Whiting (born 1967)	20 November 2019	21 October 2020	336 days	

== List of senior enlisted leaders ==
No.	Senior Enlisted Leader		Term			Ref
No.	Portrait	Name	Took office	Left office	Duration	Ref
1	Charles P. Zimkas Jr.	Chief Master Sergeant; Charles P. Zimkas Jr.	1 September 1982	~1984	~1 year, 303 days	
2	Thomas J. Echols	Chief Master Sergeant; Thomas J. Echols	~1984	October 1986	~2 years, 107 days	-
3	John W. Wright	Chief Master Sergeant; John W. Wright (1942–2019)	October 1986	~1989	~2 years, 258 days	
4	Delamar T. Jones	Chief Master Sergeant; Delamar T. Jones	~1989	December 1992	~3 years, 168 days	-
5	Richard G. Griffis	Chief Master Sergeant; Richard G. Griffis	December 1992	November 1996	~3 years, 336 days	
6	Robert M. Clougherty	Chief Master Sergeant; Robert M. Clougherty	November 1996	August 1998	~1 year, 273 days	
7	Dennis L. Fritz	Chief Master Sergeant; Dennis L. Fritz	August 1998	February 2000	~1 year, 184 days	
8	Kevin D. Estrem	Chief Master Sergeant; Kevin D. Estrem	February 2000	June 2002	~2 years, 120 days	
9	Ronald G. Kriete	Chief Master Sergeant; Ronald G. Kriete	June 2002	August 2006	~4 years, 61 days	
10	Michael T. Sullivan	Chief Master Sergeant; Michael T. Sullivan	August 2006	14 February 2008	~1 year, 183 days	
11	Richard T. Small	Chief Master Sergeant; Richard T. Small	14 February 2008	September 2011	~3 years, 212 days	
12	Linus Jordan	Chief Master Sergeant; Linus Jordan	September 2011	May 2013	~1 year, 242 days	
13	Douglas McIntyre	Chief Master Sergeant; Douglas McIntyre	May 2013	6 August 2015	~2 years, 83 days	
14	Patrick F. McMahon	Chief Master Sergeant; Patrick F. McMahon	6 August 2015	May 2016	~283 days	
15	Brendan I. Criswell	Chief Master Sergeant; Brendan I. Criswell	July 2016	November 2018	~2 years, 123 days	
16	Roger A. Towberman	Chief Master Sergeant; Roger A. Towberman (born 1966/1967)	November 2018	21 October 2020	~1 year, 341 days	
17	John F. Bentivegna	Chief Master Sergeant; John F. Bentivegna (born c. 1976)	21 October 2020	30 April 2022	1 year, 191 days	
18	Jacob C. Simmons	Chief Master Sergeant; Jacob C. Simmons (born c. 1974)	30 April 2022	7 August 2023	1 year, 99 days	
19	Caleb M. Lloyd	Chief Master Sergeant; Caleb M. Lloyd (born c. 1985)	7 August 2023	6 June 2025	1 year, 303 days	
20	Michael J. Rozneck	Chief Master Sergeant; Michael J. Rozneck (born c. 1980)	6 June 2025	Incumbent	1 year, 135 days	

== See also ==
- Space Operations Command
- Commander of Space Systems Command
- Commander of Space Training and Readiness Command
