= 9th Combat Training Squadron =

U.S. Space Force unit

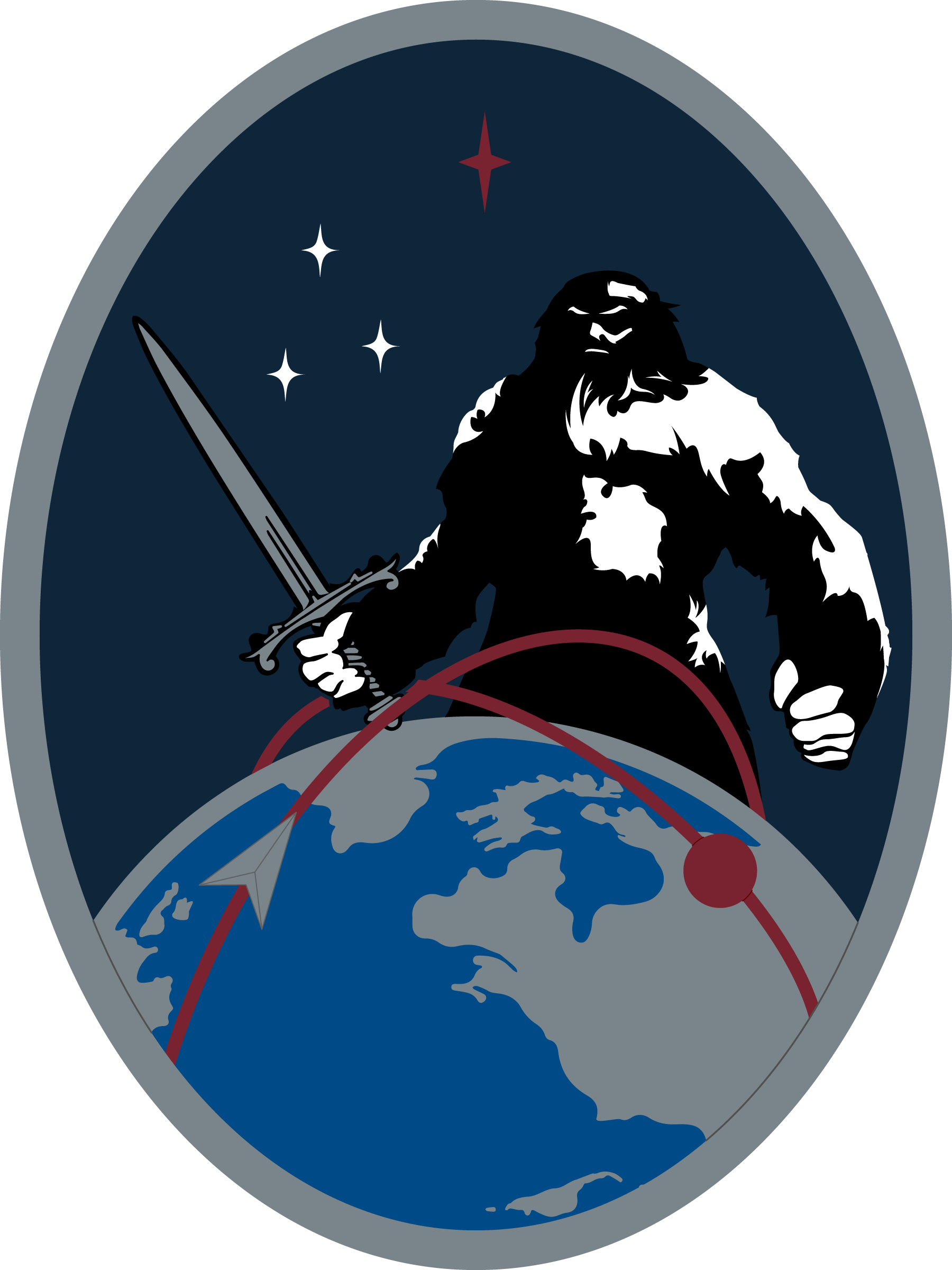
- 9 CTS emblem
- Active: 19 June 2020–present
- Country: United States
- Branch: United States Space Force
- Type: Squadron
- Role: Training
- Part of: Space Delta 9
- Headquarters: Schriever Space Force Base, Colorado, U.S.
- Nickname(s): Giants

Commanders
- Commander: Lt Col Derek Wouden

The 9th Combat Training Squadron (9 CTS) is a United States Space Force unit responsible for training Space Delta 9 personnel. It was formerly the 750th Operations Support Squadron.

== List of commanders ==
- Lt Col Aaron Lynch, 19 June 2020 – May 2022
- Lt Col William McGillivray, May 2022 – 10 June 2024
- Lt Col Derek Wouden, 10 June 2024 – present

== See also ==
- Space Delta 2
