= Space Delta 9 =

U.S. Space Force orbital warfare unit

- Delta
- Founded: 24 July 2020; 6 years ago
- Country: United States
- Branch: United States Space Force
- Type: Delta
- Role: Orbital warfare
- Part of: United States Space Force Combat Forces Command
- Headquarters: Schriever Space Force Base, Colorado, U.S.
- Nickname: Stormbringers
- Website: Official website

Commanders
- Commander: Col Bryony L. Slaughter
- Senior Enlisted Leader: CMSgt Dan M. Dempsey

Insignia
- Guidon

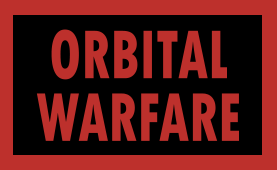
- Orbital Warfare Identification Device

Space Delta 9 (DEL 9) is a United States Space Force unit responsible for conducting orbital warfare. Its mission involves preparing, presenting, and projecting assigned and attached forces for the purpose of conducting protect and defend operations and providing national decision authorities with response options to deter and, when necessary, defeat orbital threats. Activated on 24 July 2020, the delta is headquartered at Schriever Space Force Base, Colorado.

It replaced the interim 750th Operations Group, 50th Space Wing, which was activated a month before its redesignation.

== Structure ==
Emblem	Name	Function	Headquarters	Spacecraft
Squadrons
	1st Space Operations Squadron	Space domain awareness	Schriever Space Force Base, Colorado	Advanced Technology Risk Reduction; Geosynchronous Space Situational Awareness Program; Operationally Responsive Space 5 Space Based Space Surveillance
	3rd Space Operations Squadron	Space defense	Schriever Space Force Base, Colorado	
	5th Space Operations Squadron	Technology demonstration	Joint Base Anacostia-Bolling, Washington DC	Boeing X-37B Orbital Test Vehicle
	9th Combat Training Squadron	Operational training and certification, tactics development, engineering support, and crew force management	Schriever Space Force Base, Colorado	

== List of commanders ==
No.	Commander		Term			Ref
No.	Portrait	Name	Took office	Left office	Duration	Ref
1	Casey Beard	Colonel; Casey Beard	24 July 2020	21 June 2022	1 year, 332 days	
2	Mark C. Bigley	Colonel; Mark C. Bigley	21 June 2022	2 July 2024	2 years, 11 days	
3	Ramsey M. Horn	Colonel; Ramsey M. Horn	2 July 2024	16 July 2026	2 years, 14 days	
4	Bryony L. Slaughter	Colonel; Bryony L. Slaughter	16 July 2026	Incumbent	81 days	
