= Chandler Atwood =

U.S. Space Force general officer (1978–2025)

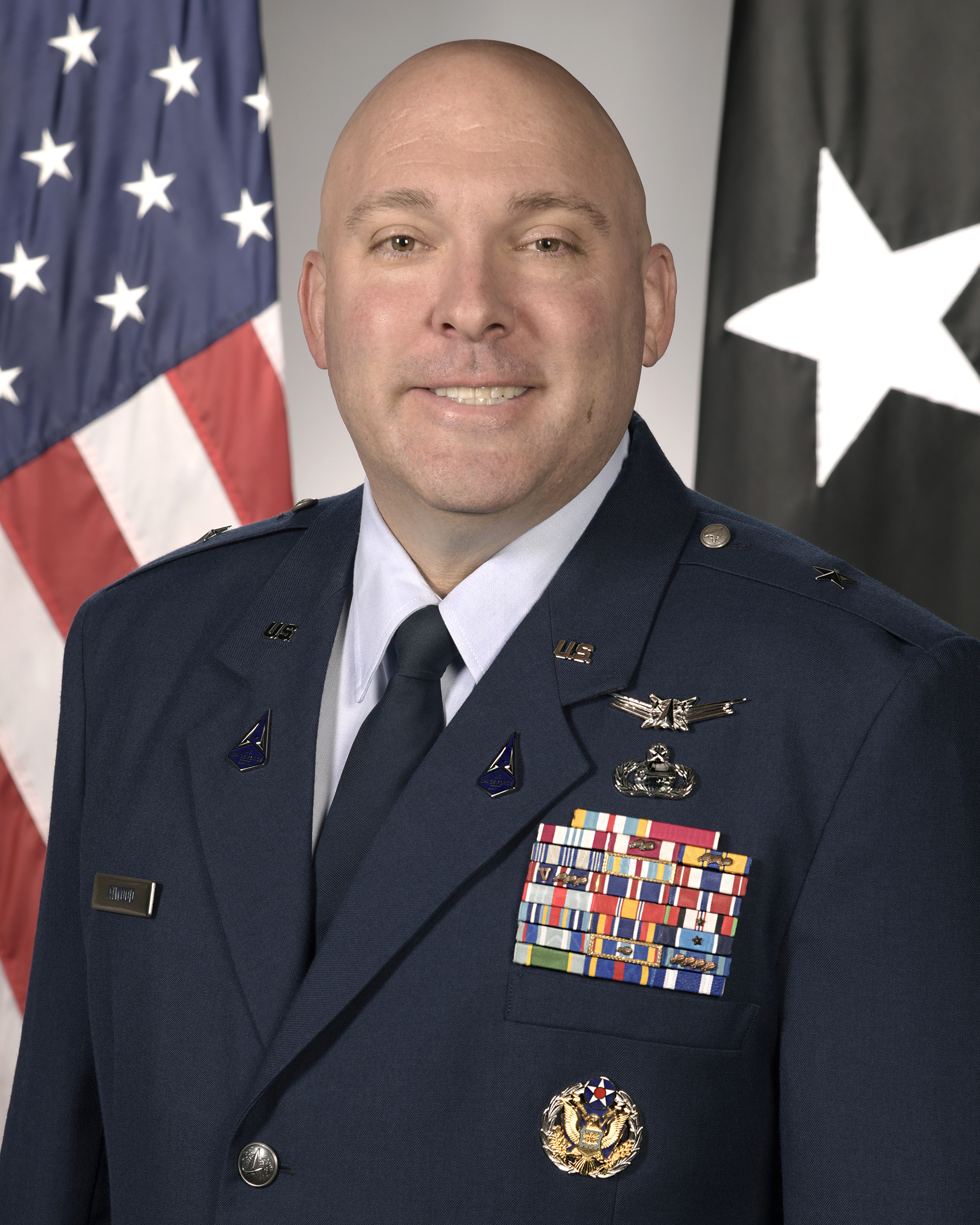
- Official portrait, 2024
- Born: September 4, 1978
- Died: June 29, 2025 (aged 46)
- Education: The Citadel (BA); American Military University (MA)
- Military career
- Allegiance: United States
- Branch: United States Air Force: United States Space Force
- Service years: 2001–2020 (Air Force): 2020–2025 (Space Force)
- Rank: Brigadier General
- Commands: Space Delta 7; 566th Intelligence Squadron
- Awards: Defense Superior Service Medal; Legion of Merit

Chandler Parrish Atwood (September 4, 1978 – June 29, 2025) was a United States Space Force brigadier general who served as the first commander of Space Delta 7 from 2020 to 2022. He last served as the vice commander and deputy commanding general (operations) of Space Operations Command.

Atwood also served as a national defense fellow at the Washington Institute for Near East Policy where he wrote about Syria.

== Background ==
Atwood was born on September 4, 1978. He died on June 29, 2025, at the age of 46, from a heart attack.

== Education ==
- 2001 Bachelor of Arts, Political Science, The Citadel, Charleston, S.C.
- 2002 Air and Space Basic Course, Maxwell Air Force Base, Ala.
- 2005 USAF Weapons Instructor Course, Nellis AFB, Nev.
- 2009 Master of Arts, Strategic Intelligence, American Military University
- 2013 Department of Defense Executive Leadership Development Program, Washington, D.C. 2014 National Defense Fellowship, The Washington Institute, Washington, D.C.
- 2014 Air War College, Maxwell AFB, Ala., by correspondence
- 2018 National War College, Fort Lesley J. McNair, Washington, D.C.

== Military career ==
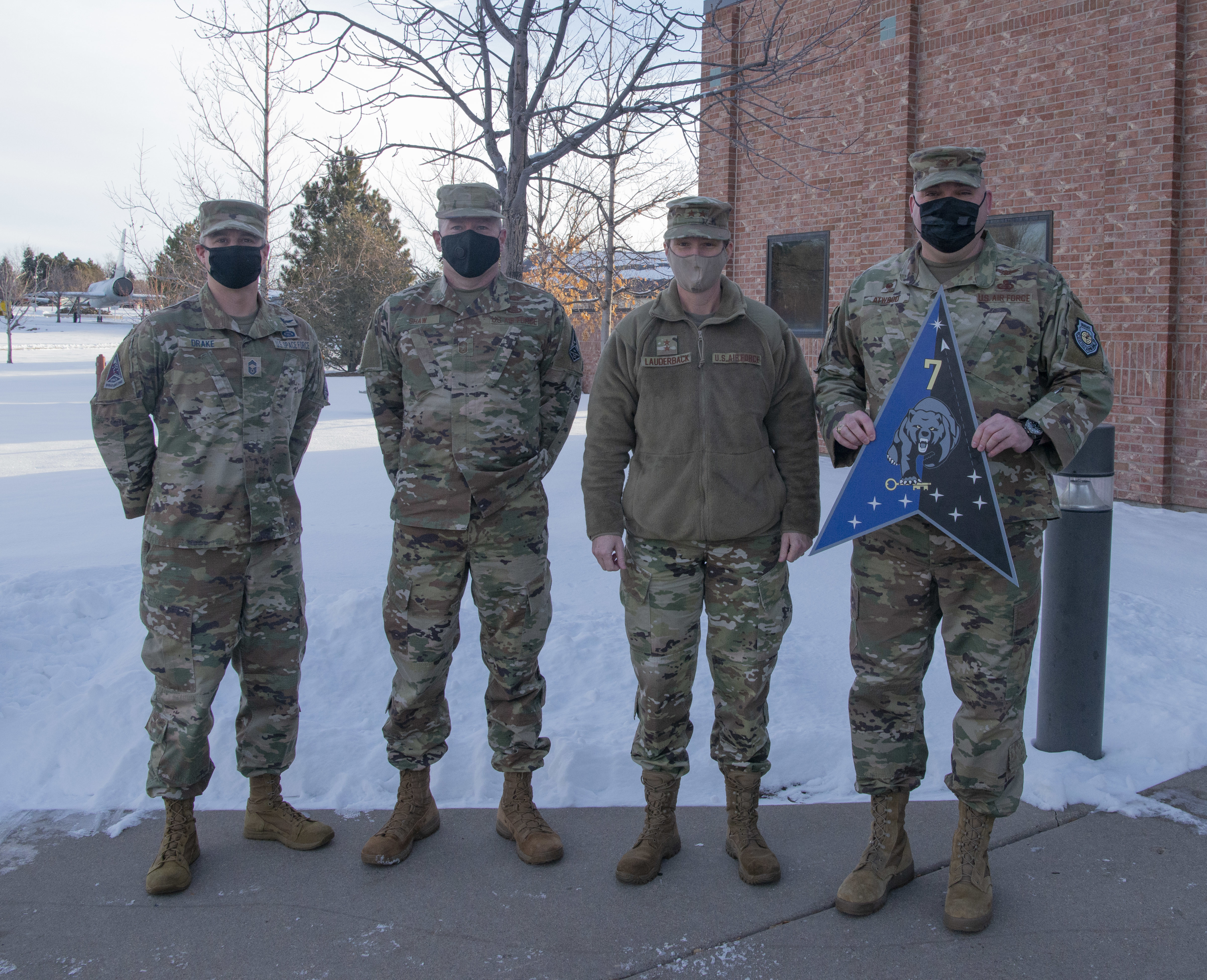
Col Atwood (right) holding Space Delta 7's emblem, 2021

In 2024, Atwood was nominated for promotion to brigadier general.

1. October 2001 – May 2002, Student, Intelligence Applications Officer Course, Goodfellow Air Force Base, TX
2. June 2002 – June 2003, Deputy Chief, Intelligence Operations, 20th Fighter Wing, Shaw AFB, S.C.
3. June 2003 – June 2005, Chief, Squadron Intelligence, 55th Fighter Squadron, 20th Fighter Wing, Shaw AFB, S.C.
4. June 2005 – December 2005, Student, Intelligence Instructor Course, USAF Weapons School, Nellis AFB, Nev.
5. December 2006 – November 2007, Chief, Intelligence Operations, 35th Fighter Wing, Misawa AB, Japan
6. December 2007 – August 2008, Intelligence Flight Commander, 35th Fighter Wing, Misawa AB, Japan
7. August 2008 – August 2009, USAF Weapons School Instructor Flight Commander, 57th Wing, Nellis AFB, Nev.
8. August 2009 – May 2011, Director of Staff and USAF Weapons School Instructor, 57th Wing, Nellis AFB, Nev.
9. May 2011 – September 2011, Secretary of Air Force's ISR Review Committee, Headquarters U.S. Air Force Directorate of Intelligence, the Pentagon, Arlington, Va.
10. September 2011 – July 2013, Director of Operations, Geospatial Intelligence and Measurement and Signatures Intelligence Production Squadron, National Air and Space Intelligence Center, Wright-Patterson AFB, Ohio
11. July 2013 – May 2014, National Defense Fellowship, The Washington Institute, Washington, D.C.
12. June 2014 – July 2015, Chief, Headquarters Air Force Directorate of Intelligence Action Group, Headquarters U.S. Air Force, the Pentagon, Arlington, Va.
13. July 2015 – July 2017, Commander, 566th Intelligence Squadron, Buckley AFB, Colo.
14. July 2017 – June 2018, Student, National War College, Fort Lesley J. McNair, Washington, D.C.
15. July 2018 – May 2020, Chief, Intelligence Capabilities and Requirements Division, U.S. Special Operations Command, MacDill AFB, Fla.
16. July 2020 – May 2022, Commander, Space Delta 7, Peterson SFB, Colo.
17. June 2022 – June 2024, Director of Intelligence, Space Operations Command, Peterson SFB, Colo.
18. June 2024 – June 2025, Vice-Commander and Deputy Commanding General, Operations, Space Operations Command, Peterson SFB, Colo.

== Awards and decorations ==
Atwood is the recipient of the following awards:

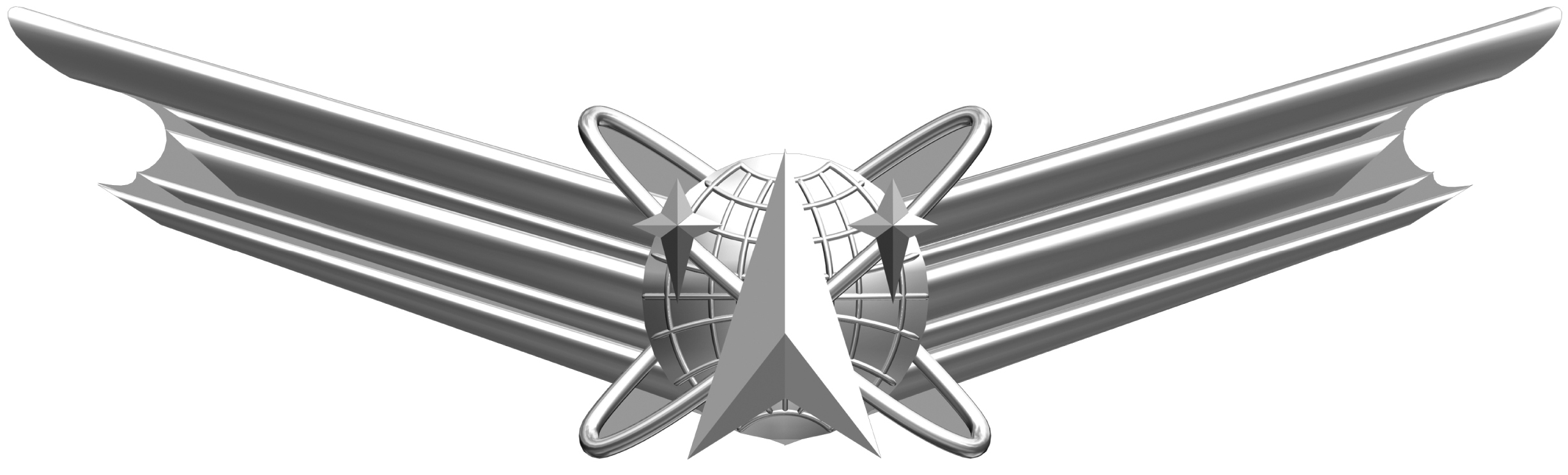
Basic Space Operations Badge

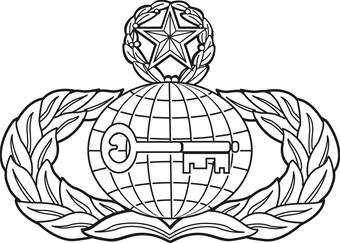

Master Intelligence Badge

Air Staff Badge

Commander's Insignia

Defense Superior Service Medal
Legion of Merit
Meritorious Service Medal
Meritorious Service Medal with two bronze oak leaf clusters
Air Force Commendation Medal with three bronze oak leaf clusters
Air Force Achievement Medal
Joint Meritorious Unit Award
Air Force Meritorious Unit Award
Air Force Outstanding Unit Award with three bronze oak leaf clusters
Air Force Outstanding Unit Award (second ribbon to denote fourth award)
Air Force Organizational Excellence Award
National Defense Service Medal
Afghanistan Campaign Medal with one bronze service star
Global War on Terrorism Expeditionary Medal
Global War on Terrorism Service Medal
Remote Combat Effects Campaign Medal
Small Arms Expert Marksmanship Ribbon
Air Force Expeditionary Service Ribbon with gold frame and two bronze oak leaf clusters
Air Force Longevity Service Award with three bronze oak leaf clusters
Air and Space Campaign Medal
Air Force Training Ribbon
NATO Medal (Yugoslavia)

== Dates of promotion ==
Rank	Branch	Date
Second Lieutenant	Air Force	May 4, 2001
First Lieutenant	Air Force	May 4, 2003
Captain	Air Force	May 4, 2005
Major	Air Force	June 1, 2011
Lieutenant Colonel	Air Force	February 1, 2015
Colonel	Air Force	June 1, 2018
Colonel	Space Force	~June 24, 2021
Brigadier General	Space Force	June 11, 2024

== Writings ==
- "Activity-Based Intelligence: Revolutionizing Military Intelligence Analysis," Joint Forces Quarterly, 2nd Quarter 2015
- "U.S. Military Options in Syria," The Washington Institute, May 28, 2014
- "Syran Air-Defense Capabilities and the Threat to Potential U.S. Air Operations," The Washington Institute, May 23, 2014
- "Between Not-In and All-In: U.S. Military Options in Syria," The Washington Institute, May 16, 2014
- "Linking Targets to Political Objectives in Syria," The Washington Institute, August 30, 2013
- "Every Second Counts," USAF Weapons School, Weapons Review, Winter 2009

Military offices
New unit	Commander of Space Delta 7; 2020–2022	Succeeded by Brett T. Swigert
Preceded by Brian Sidari	Director of Intelligence of Space Operations Command; 2022–2024	Succeeded by Marqus D. Randall
Preceded by Devin Pepper	Deputy Commander of Space Operations Command; 2024–2025	Succeeded by Casey Beard
Preceded by Brian Sidari	Director of Intelligence of the United States Space Command; 2025	Succeeded by Nathan L. Rusin
