= Gregory Gagnon =

U.S. Space Force general

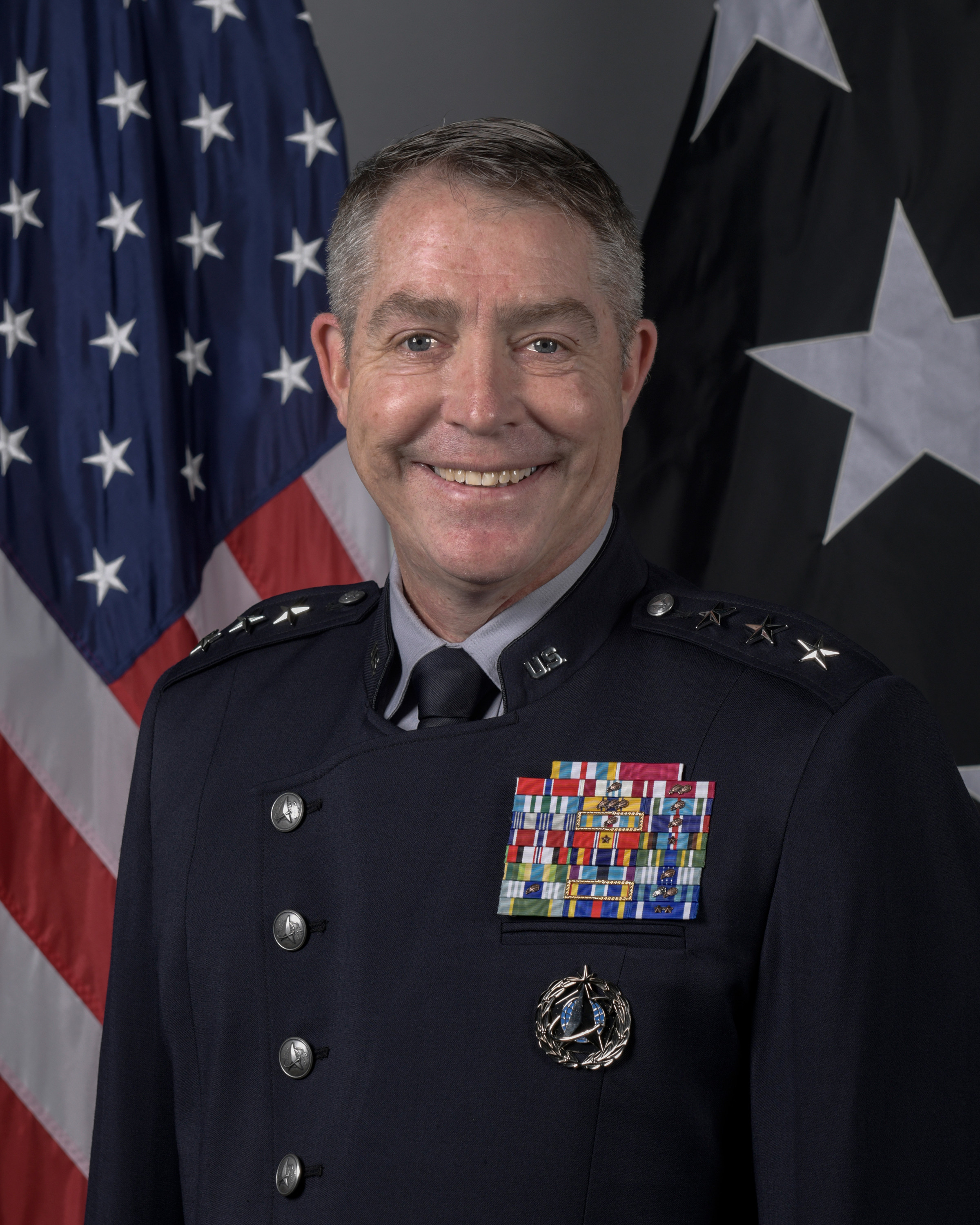
- Official portrait, 2025
- Born: c. 1972 (age 53–54)
- Education: Saint Michael's College (BA): Naval Postgraduate School (MS)
- Military career
- Allegiance: United States
- Branch: United States Air Force: United States Space Force
- Service years: 1994–2021 (Air Force): 2021–present (Space Force)
- Rank: Lieutenant General
- Commands: United States Space Force Combat Forces Command: Texas Cryptologic Center; 67th Cyberspace Operations Group; 495th Expeditionary Intelligence Squadron; 94th Intelligence Squadron
- Awards: Defense Superior Service Medal: Legion of Merit (3); Bronze Star Medal

Gregory J. Gagnon (born c. 1972) is a United States Space Force lieutenant general who serves as the commander of the United States Space Force Combat Forces Command. He previously served as the deputy chief of space operations for intelligence. A career intelligence officer, he is the first general officer in the Space Force from a non-space professional career field.

Gagnon entered the United States Air Force in 1994 after graduating from Saint Michael's College in Vermont. He has extensive intelligence and cyberspace operations experience, commanding the Texas Cryptologic Center, 67th Cyberspace Operations Group, 495th Expeditionary Intelligence Squadron, and 94th Intelligence Squadron. He also had assignments in Afghanistan and South Korea.

In 2021, Gagnon transferred from the Air Force to the Space Force. He is the first general officer in the Space Force from the intelligence career field, and the first one to not have come from the space operations or space acquisitions career field. As the deputy chief of space operations for intelligence, he serves as the chief of the Space Force's service cryptologic component.

== Education ==
- 1994 Bachelor of Arts, Economics, Saint Michael's College, Winooski, Vt.
- 1999 Master of Science, Defense Analysis in Information Operations, Naval Postgraduate School, Monterey, Calif.
- 2000 Squadron Officer School, Maxwell Air Force Base, Ala.
- 2006 Air Command and Staff College, Maxwell AFB, Ala.
- 2011 Master of National Security Strategy, National War College, Washington, D.C.
- 2016 Enterprise Perspective Seminar, Alan L. Freed Associates, Capitol Hill Club, Washington, D.C.
- 2021 Enterprise Leadership Program, The University of North Carolina at Chapel Hill, North Carolina

== Military career ==
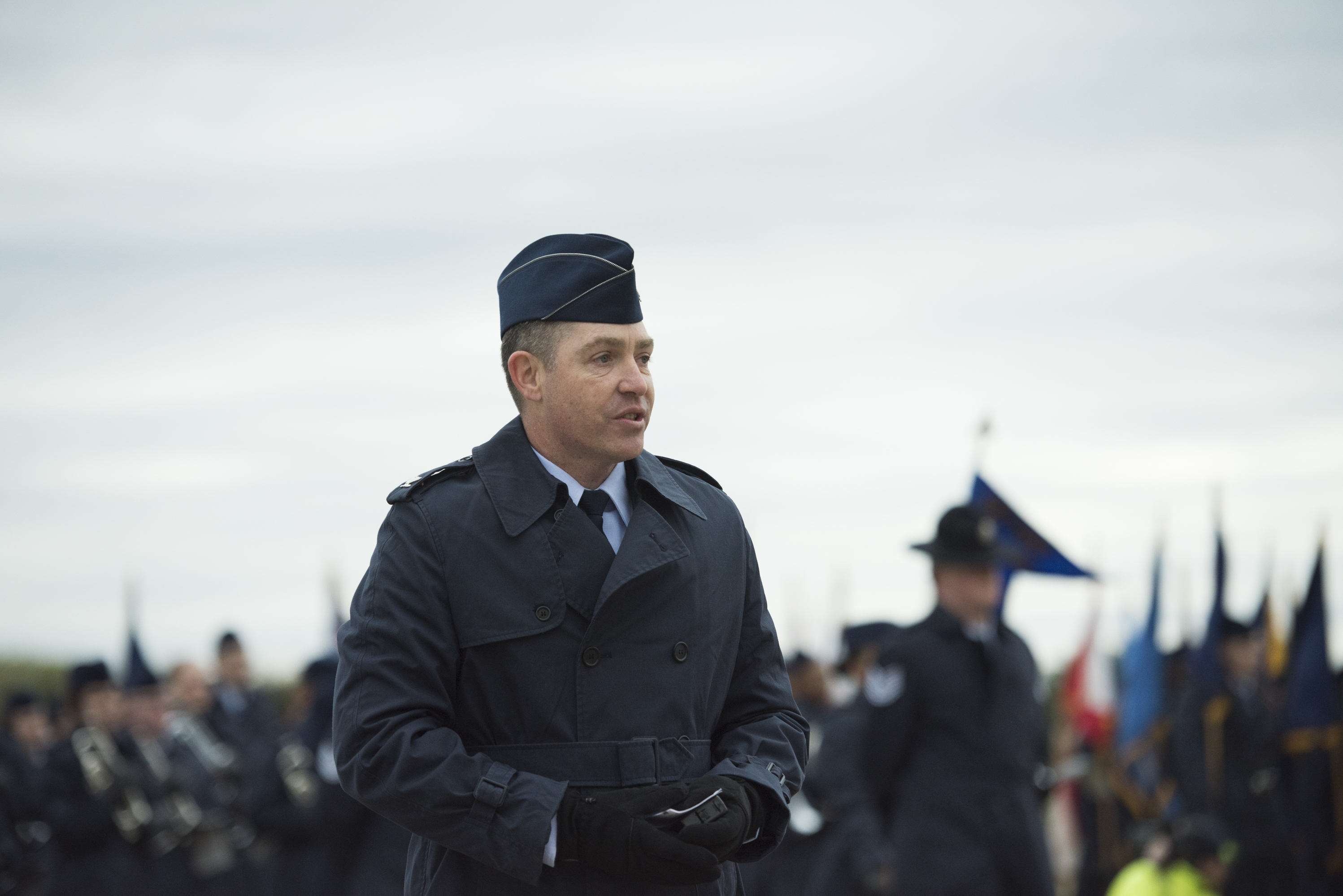
Gagnon presents a speech during the basic training graduation, 2018

In September 2021, Gagnon was nominated for transfer from the United States Air Force into the Space Force. In October 2021, he transferred to the Space Force. In September 2022, he was nominated for promotion to major general.

=== Assignments ===
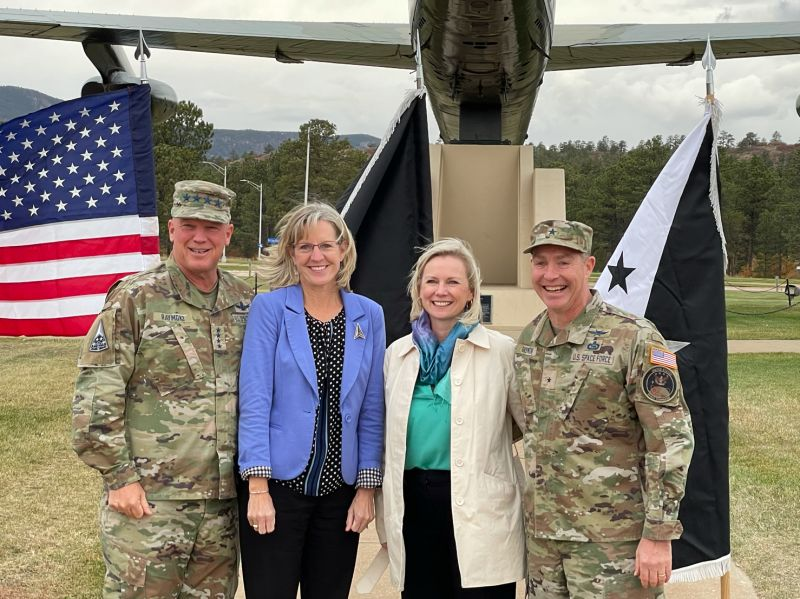
Gagnon transferred to the Space Force in October 2021, the first general officer from a non-space professional career field

1. November 1994 – July 1995, Student, Intelligence Training, 316th Student Training Squadron, Goodfellow Air Force Base, Texas
2. August 1995 – August 1996, Assistant Chief of Targets, 8th Operations Support Squadron, Kunsan Air Base, South Korea
3. August 1996 – May 1998, Mission Operations Commander, 13th Intelligence Squadron, Beale AFB, Calif.
4. June 1998 – December 1999, Student, Naval Postgraduate School, Monterey, Calif.
5. January 2000 – March 2002, Instructor, Air Force Special Operations School, Hurlburt AFB, Fla.
6. March 2002 – December 2003, Staff Officer, Headquarters Pacific Air Forces, Hickam AFB, Hawaii
7. January 2004 – July 2005, Flight Commander, Intel Operations and Missile Operations Center, PACAF Air Intelligence Squadron, Hickam AFB, Hawaii
8. July 2005 – June 2006, Student, Air Command and Staff College, Maxwell AFB, Ala.
9. June 2006 – March 2008, Director of Operations, 607th AIS, Osan AB, South Korea
10. March 2008 – July 2010, Commander, 94th Intelligence Squadron, Fort George G. Meade, Md.
11. July 2010 – June 2011, Student, National War College, Fort Lesley J. McNair, Washington, D.C.
12. August 2011 – July 2012, Commander, 495th Expeditionary Intelligence Squadron, Kandahar, Afghanistan
13. August 2012 – July 2014, Division Chief, Analysis and Intelligence Plans, Strategic Joint Intelligence Operations Center, Offutt AFB, Neb.
14. July 2014 – July 2016, Commander, 67 Cyberspace Operations Group, Joint Base San Antonio-Lackland, Texas
15. July 2016 – July 2018, Director, Commander's Action Group, Headquarters Air Force Space Command, Peterson AFB, Colo.
16. July 2018 – July 2019, Commander, National Security Agency in Texas, San Antonio
17. July 2019 – September 2020, Director of Intelligence, Air Combat Command, Joint Base Langley-Eustis, Va.
18. September 2020 – July 2022, Director of Intelligence, U.S. Space Command, Schriever AFB, Colo.
19. July 2022 – August 2025, Deputy Chief of Space Operations for Intelligence, United States Space Force, the Pentagon, Arlington, Va.
20. August 2025 – November 2025, Special Assistant to the Chief of Space Operations, U.S. Space Force, the Pentagon, Arlington, Va.
21. November 2025 – present, Commander, Headquarters Combat Forces Command, U.S. Space Force, Peterson Space Force Base, Colo.

== Awards and decorations ==
Gagnon is the recipient of the following awards:

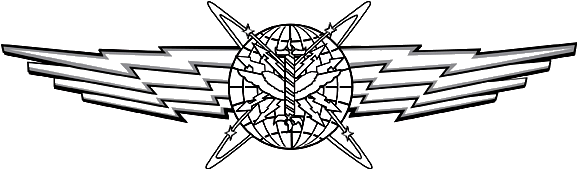

Cyberspace Operator Badge

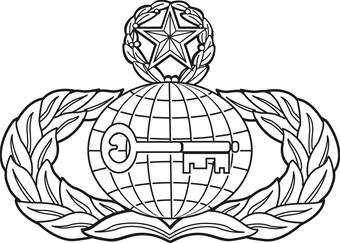

Master Intelligence Badge

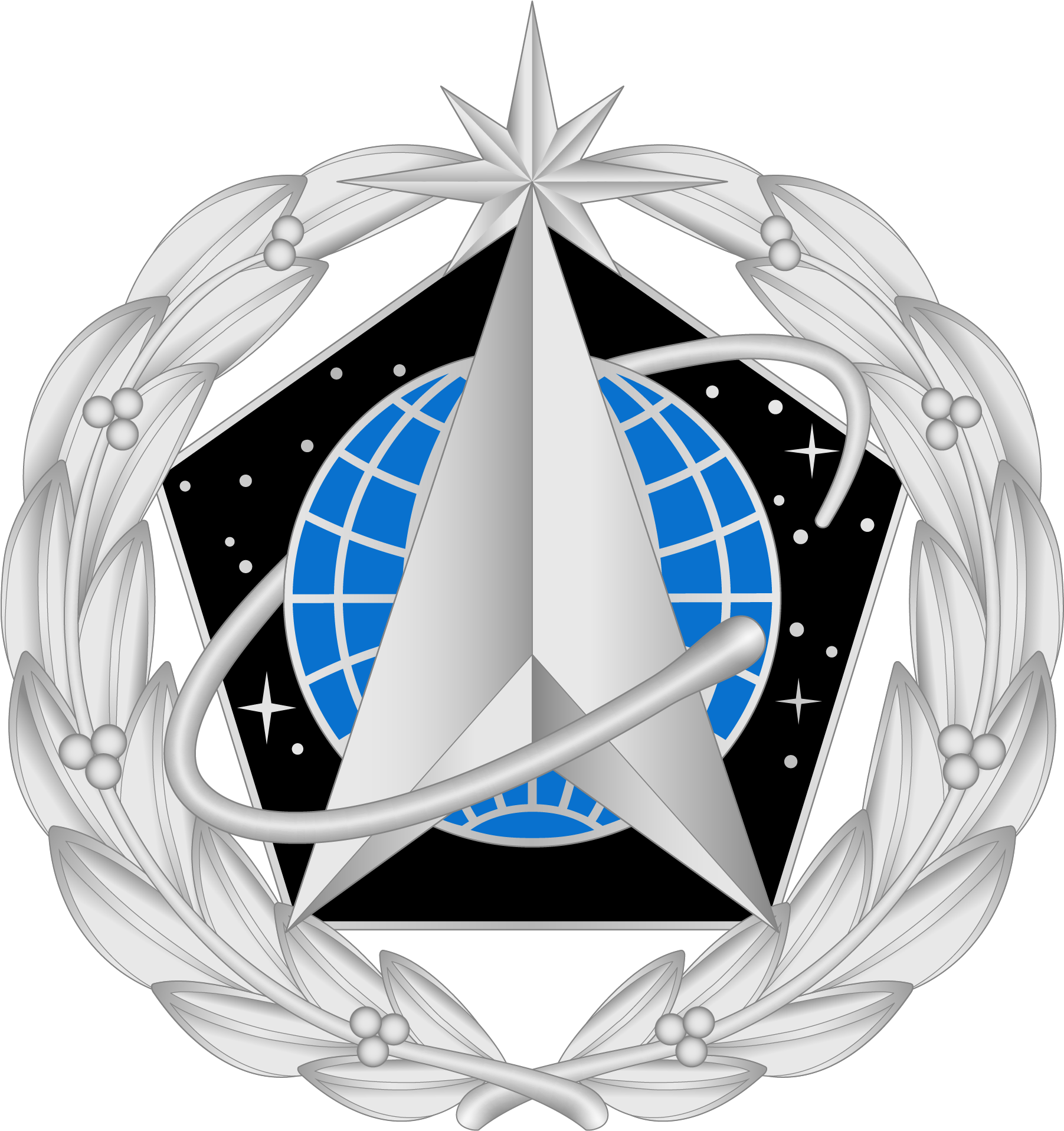

Space Staff Badge

Defense Superior Service Medal
Legion of Merit with two bronze oak leaf clusters
Bronze Star Medal
Defense Meritorious Service Medal with one bronze oak leaf cluster
Meritorious Service Medal with two bronze oak leaf clusters
Joint Service Commendation Medal with one bronze oak leaf cluster
Air Force Commendation Medal with three bronze oak leaf clusters
Joint Service Achievement Medal with one bronze oak leaf cluster
Air Force Achievement Medal
Joint Meritorious Unit Award
Air Force Outstanding Unit Award with one bronze oak leaf cluster
Air Force Organizational Excellence Award
National Defense Service Medal with one bronze service star
Armed Forces Expeditionary Medal with one bronze service star
Afghanistan Campaign Medal
Global War on Terrorism Service Medal
Korea Defense Service Medal
Armed Forces Service Medal
Humanitarian Service Medal
Air Force Overseas Short Tour Service Ribbon with one bronze oak leaf cluster
Air Force Overseas Long Tour Service Ribbon with one bronze oak leaf cluster
Air Force Expeditionary Service Ribbon with gold frame
Air Force Longevity Service Award with one silver and one bronze oak leaf cluster
Small Arms Expert Marksmanship Ribbon
Air Force Training Ribbon
NATO Medal (Yugoslavia) with two bronze service stars

== Dates of promotion ==
Rank	Branch	Date
Second Lieutenant	Air Force	May 7, 1994
First Lieutenant	Air Force	August 2, 1996
Captain	Air Force	August 2, 1998
Major	Air Force	February 1, 2005
Lieutenant Colonel	Air Force	June 1, 2008
Colonel	Air Force	October 1, 2013
Brigadier General	Air Force	August 2, 2019
Brigadier General	Space Force	~April 29, 2021
Major General	Space Force	September 29, 2022
Lieutenant General	Space Force	November 3, 2025

== Writings ==
- "Why Military Space Matters" (PDF). Joint Force Quarterly (110): 61–63. July 2023.
- "Why Space Force Intel". American Intelligence Journal. 2022.
- "Information Warfare, Cyberspace Objectives and the US Air Force" (PDF). Air and Space Power Journal. 34 (3): 4–9. Fall 2020.
- With Nishawn Smagh (October 9, 2019). "How airmen can work together for persistent ISR". C4ISRNET.
- With David D. Thompson and Christopher W. McLeod (Summer 2018). "Space as a War-fighting Domain" (PDF). Air and Space Power Journal. 32 (2): 4–8.
- With B. Edwin Wilson (Spring 2016). "Embedding Airmanship in the Cyberspace Domain" (PDF). The Cyber Defense Review. 1 (1): 27–32.
- "Network-Centric Special Operations—Exploring New Operational Paradigms" (PDF). Air and Space Power Chronicles. February 4, 2002.
- With Bill Nelson, Rodney Choi, Michael lacobucci, and Mark Mitchell (December 1999). "Cyberterror: Prospects and Implications" (PDF). Center of the Study of Terrorism and Irregular Warfare.

Military offices
Preceded by Douglas S. Coppinger	Commander of the Texas Cryptologic Center; 2018–2019	Succeeded by Aaron D. Drake
Preceded by Aaron Prupas	Director of Intelligence of the Air Combat Command; 2019–2020	Succeeded by Steven M. Gorski
Preceded by Leah G. Lauderback	Director of Intelligence of the United States Space Command; 2020–2022	Succeeded by Brian Sidari
Preceded by Leah G. Lauderback	Deputy Chief of Space Operations for Intelligence; 2022–2025	Succeeded by Brian Sidari
Preceded by David N. Miller	Commander of the United States Space Force Combat Forces Command; 2025–present	Incumbent
