= Casey Beard =

U.S. Space Force colonel

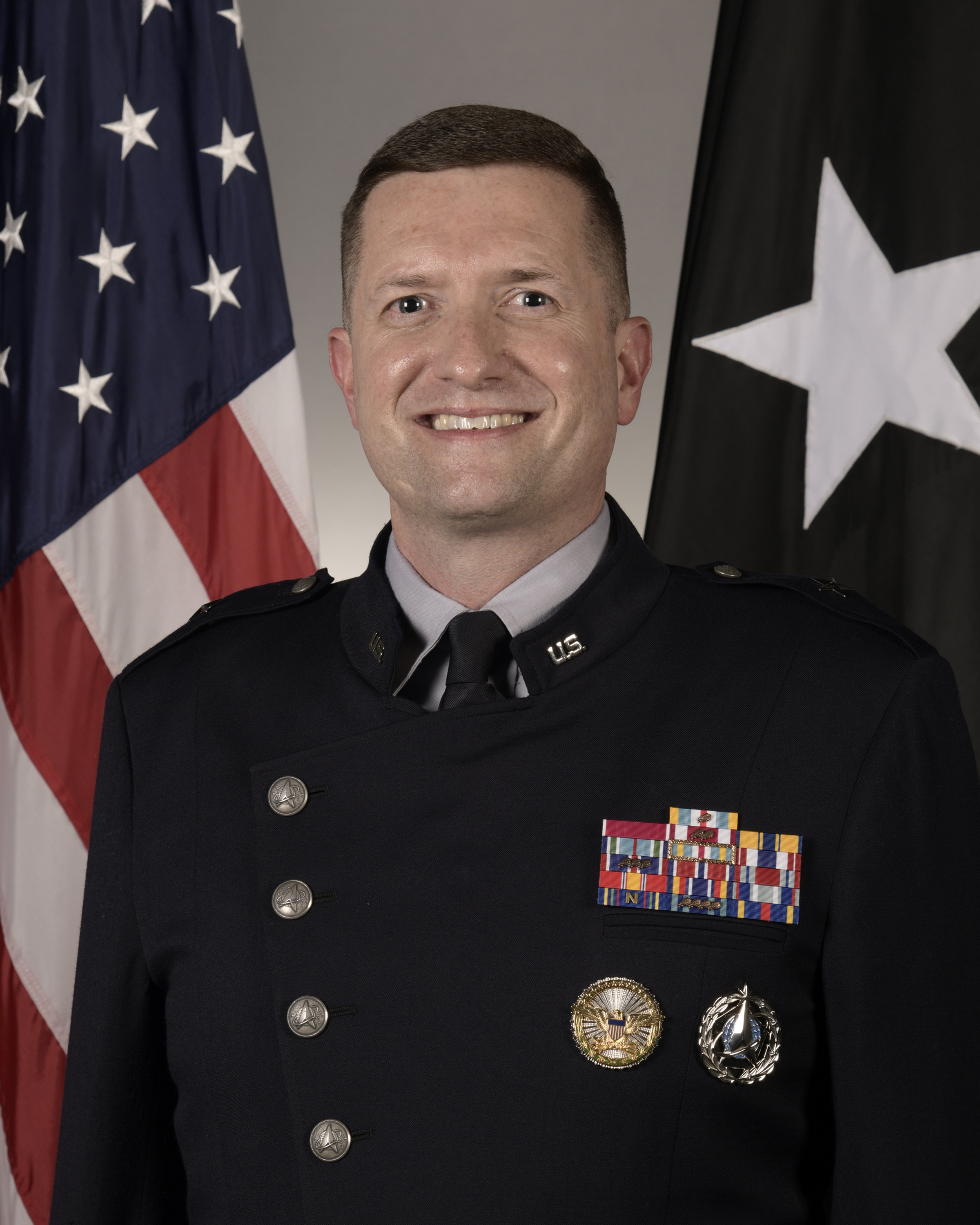
- Official portrait, 2025
- Born: c. 1979 (age 46–47); Cheyenne, Wyoming, U.S.
- Military career
- Allegiance: United States
- Branch: United States Air Force (2001-2019); United States Space Force (2019-present)
- Service years: 2001–present
- Rank: Brigadier General
- Nickname: Shaggy
- Commands: Space Delta 9; 750th Operations Group; 1st Space Operations Squadron
- Awards: Defense Superior Service Medal; Legion of Merit

Casey Michael Beard (born c. 1979) is a United States Space Force brigadier general serving as Deputy Commander, Headquarters Combat Forces Command. He previously served as the first commander of Space Delta 9 from 2020 to 2022. He was the team leader who drafted the U.S. Space Force's first service doctrine.

Beard earned his commission through the Air Force Reserve Officer Training Corps in 2001 following graduation from Clemson University. He has served across multiple operational disciplines including nuclear operations, satellite communications, space situational awareness, space control, and operational level command and control. In 2019, Beard was nominated for transfer to the U.S. Space Force from the U.S. Air Force. His previous assignment was as the deputy director of the Space Strategy and Plans Directorate in the Office of the Secretary of Defense for Policy, Pentagon, Washington D.C.

== Education ==
- 2001 Bachelor of Science, Chemistry, Clemson University, S. Car.
- 2006 Squadron Officer School, Top Third Graduate, Maxwell AFB, Ala.
- 2009 Master of Science, Space Studies, American Military University, in correspondence
- 2009 U.S. Air Force Weapons School, Distinguished Graduate and Mission Award, Nellis AFB, Nev.
- 2014 Air Command and Staff College, Distinguished Graduate, Maxwell AFB, Ala.
- 2015 U.S. Air Force School of Advanced Air and Space Studies, Maxwell AFB, Ala.
- 2018 National War College, Distinguished Graduate, Fort McNair, Washington D.C.

== Assignments ==
1. June 2001 – February 2002, Student, Officer Space Prerequisite Training; Student, Peacekeeper Initial Qualification Training, Vandenberg Air Force Base, Calif.
2. February 2002 – September 2002, Deputy Missile Combat Crew Commander, 400th Missile Squadron, F.E. Warren AFB, Wyo.
3. September 2002 – June 2003, Deputy Missile Combat Crew Commander Instructor, 90th Operational Support Squadron, F.E. Warren AFB, Wyo.
4. July 2003 – November 2004, Missile Combat Crew Commander; Flight Commander, 400th MS, F.E. Warren AFB, Wyo.
5. November 2004 – April 2006, Missile Combat Crew Commander Evaluator; Deputy Chief, Standardization and Evaluation Division, 90th Operations Group, F.E. Warren AFB, Wyo.
6. April 2006 – May 2006 Student, Squadron Officer School, Maxwell AFB, Ala.
7. May 2006 – September 2006, Student, Milstar Initial Qualification Training, Vandenberg AFB, Calif.
8. October 2006 – June 2008, Mission Commander; Lead Instructor, 4th Space Operations Squadron, Schriever AFB, Colo.
9. July 2008 – June 2009, Executive Officer, Space Innovation and Development Center, Schriever AFB, Colo.
10. June 2009 – December 2009, Student, USAF Weapons Instructor Course, Nellis AFB, Nev.
11. January 2010 – June 2013, Deputy Chief, Space Situational Awareness Branch; Chief, Defensive Operations Branch, 614th Air and Space Operations Center, Vandenberg AFB, Calif.
12. August 2013 – June 2014, Student, Air Command and Staff College, Maxwell AFB, Ala.
13. July 2014 – June 2015, Student, School of Advanced Air and Space Studies, Maxwell AFB, Ala.
14. July 2015 – July 2017, Commander, 1st SOPS, Schriever AFB, Colo.
15. August 2017 – June 2018, Student, National War College, Fort McNair, Washington D.C.
16. June 2018 – June 2020, deputy director, Space Strategy and Plans Directorate, Office of the Secretary of Defense for Policy, Pentagon, Washington D.C.
17. June 2020 – July 2020, Commander, 750th Operations Group, Schriever AFB, Colo.
18. July 2020–June 2022, Commander, Space Delta 9, Schriever Space Force Base, Colo.
19. July 2022–June 2023, Director, Commander’s Action Group, USSPACECOM, Peterson SFB, Colo.
20. June 2023–June 2025, Senior Executive Officer to the Chief of Space Operations, the Pentagon, Arlington, Va.
21. June 2025–November 2025, Deputy Commander, Headquarters Space Operations Command, Peterson SFB, Colo.
22. November 2025–present, Deputy Commander, Headquarters Combat Forces Command, U.S. Space Force, Peterson SFB, Colo.

== Effective dates of promotion ==
Rank	Date
Second lieutenant	May 10, 2001
First lieutenant	May 30, 2003
Captain	May 30, 2005
Major	June 1, 2011
Lieutenant colonel	Feb. 1, 2015
Colonel	March 1, 2019
Brigadier General	June 30, 2025

== Awards and decorations ==
Col Beard has been awarded the following:

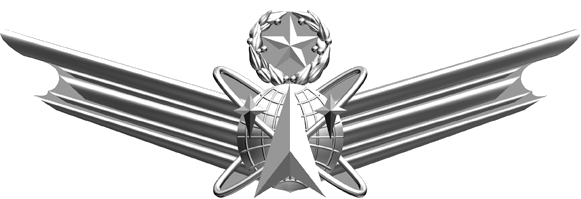

Badge	Command Space Operations Badge		
1st Row	Defense Superior Service Medal		Meritorious Service Medal with 2 bronze Oak leaf clusters
2nd Row	Air Force Commendation Medal	Joint Service Achievement Medal	Air Force Meritorious Unit Award
3rd Row	Air Force Outstanding Unit Award with 3 bronze Oak leaf clusters	Air Force Organizational Excellence Award	Air Force Combat Readiness Medal
4th Row	National Defense Service Medal	Global War on Terrorism Service Medal	Air and Space Campaign Medal
5th Row	Nuclear Deterrence Operations Service Medal with gold "N" Device	Air Force Longevity Service Award with 3 bronze Oak leaf clusters	Air Force Training Ribbon
Badges	Office of the Secretary of Defense Identification Badge		Basic Missile Operations Badge

Military offices
Preceded by ???	Deputy Director of Space Strategy and Plans of the Office of the Under Secretary of Defense for Policy; 2018–2020	Succeeded by September S. Dasilva
New office	Commander of Space Delta 9; 2020–2022	Succeeded by Mark C. Bigley
Preceded by James Peterson	Director of the Commander's Action Group of the United States Space Command; 2022–2023	Succeeded by Christopher A. Fernengel
Preceded by Matthew E. Holston	Senior Executive Officer to the Chief of Space Operations; 2023–2025	Succeeded by Phillip A. Verroco
Preceded by Chandler Atwood	Deputy Commander of the United States Space Force Combat Forces Command; 2025–present	Incumbent
