= Brian Sidari =

U.S. Space Force officer

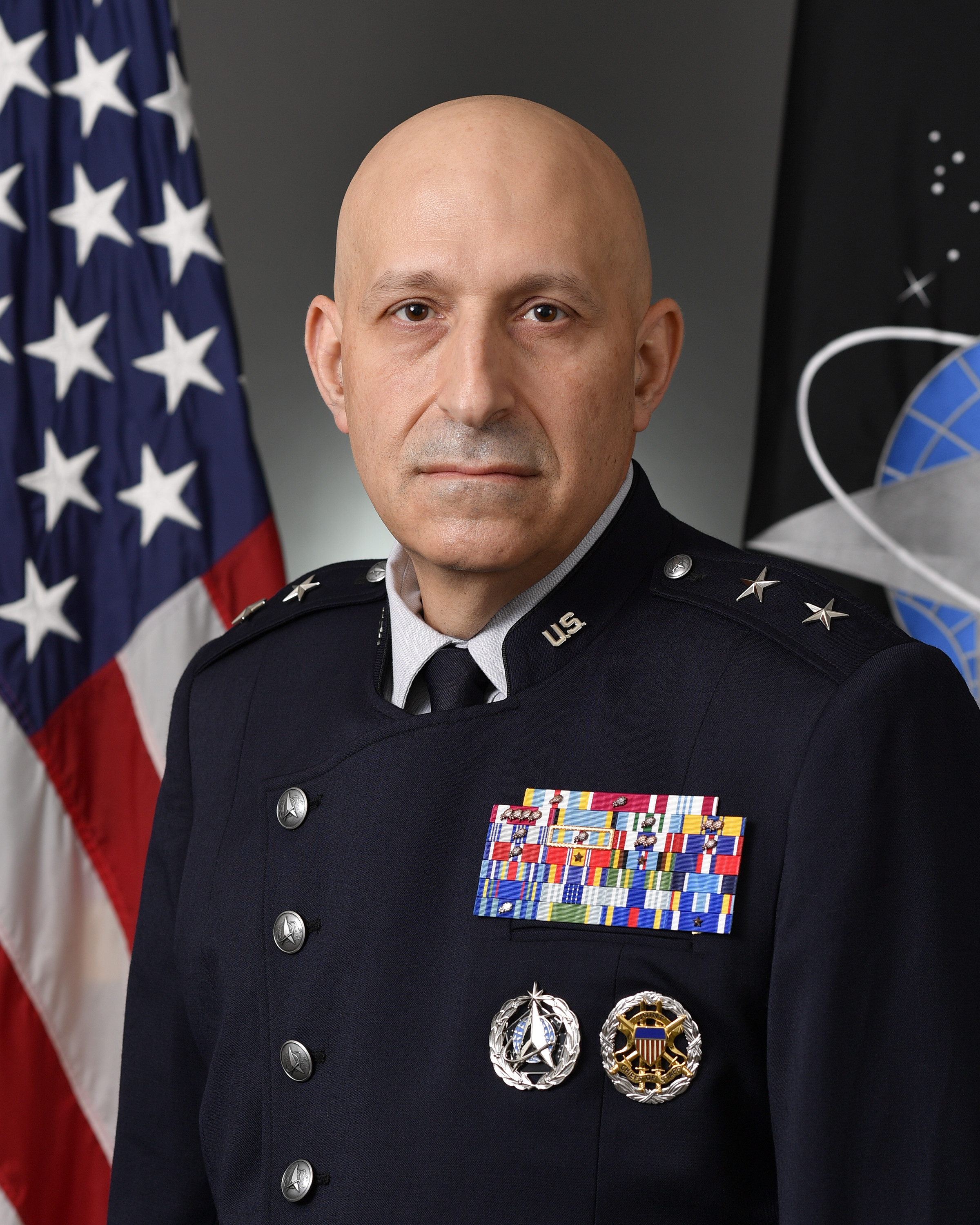
- Official portrait, 2025
- Born: April 15, 1973 (age 53); Macedonia, Ohio, U.S.
- Education: Kent State University (BA)
- Military career
- Allegiance: United States
- Branch: United States Air Force: United States Space Force
- Service years: 1995–2021 (Air Force): 2021–present (Space Force)
- Rank: Major General
- Commands: 6th Intelligence Squadron
- Awards: Defense Superior Service Medal: Legion of Merit (2)

Brian David Sidari (born April 15, 1973) is a United States Space Force major general who serves as the deputy chief of space operations for intelligence. He previously served as the director of intelligence of the United States Space Command. A career intelligence officer, he has commanded 6th Intelligence Squadron and served as vice commander of the 480th Intelligence, Surveillance, and Reconnaissance Wing.

== Early life and education ==
Sidari is native of Macedonia, Ohio. He received a B.A. degree in political science in 1995 from Kent State University. He later earned M.S. degrees from Air Command and Staff College and the National Defense University.

== Military career ==
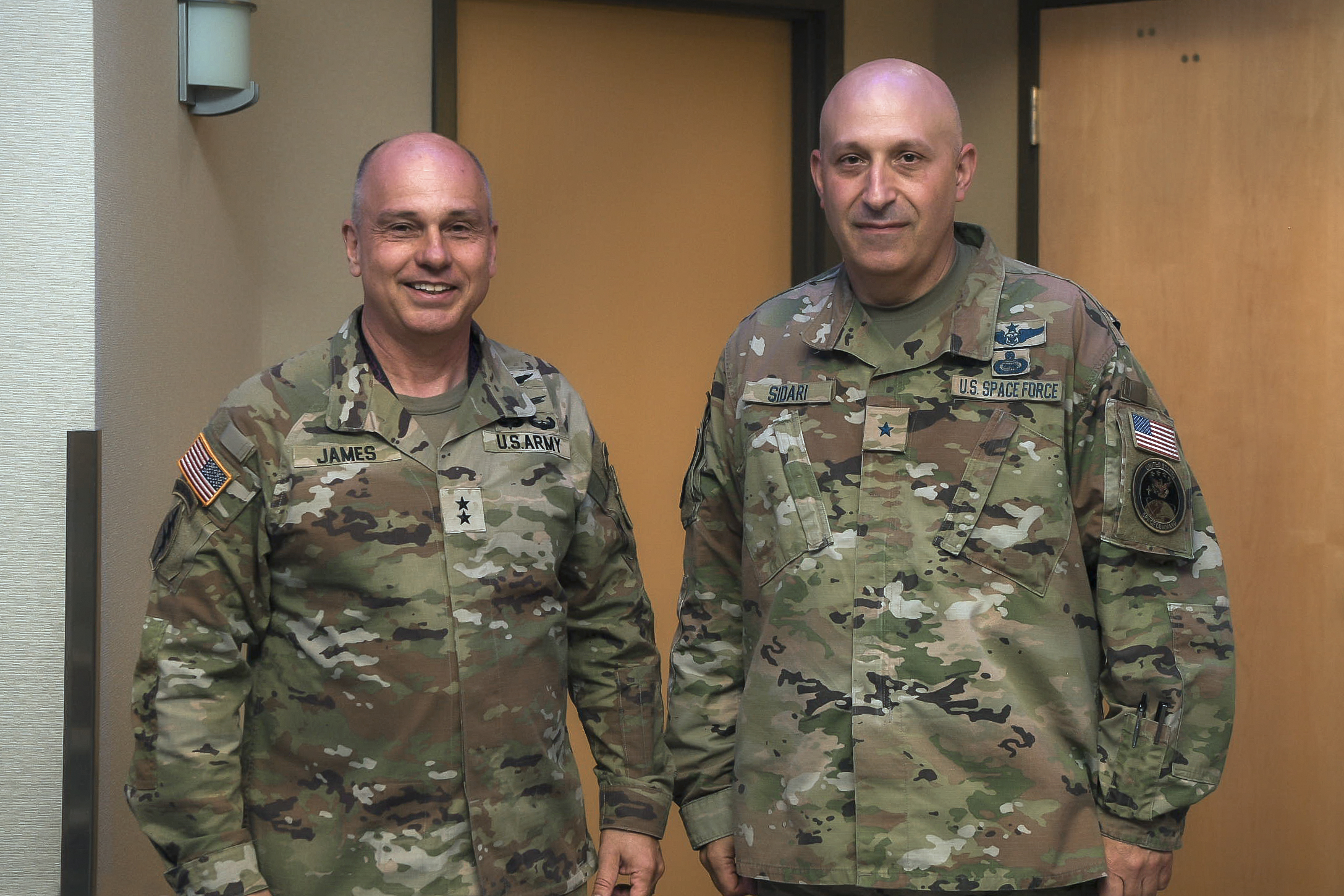
Sidari with Maj. Gen. James during his visit to Joint Task Force–Space Defense, 2022

Sidari entered the United States Air Force on June 1, 1995, after receiving his commission as a second lieutenant from the Kent State University’s Reserve Officer Training Corps program. His first assignment was as assistant regional director of assignments at The Pennsylvania University. After that, he was a student for a year with the 315th Weapons Squadron at Goodfellow Air Force Base, Texas. In December 2017, he was assigned as squadron support flight commander and chief of intelligence of the 22nd Training Squadron. After more than a year, he was reassigned to the 93rd Air Control Wing as the airborne intelligence officer, wing executive officer, and flight commander. From July 2002 to May 2005, he was assigned to the Air Staff as the chief of ISR strategy and doctrine, Northrop Grumman RQ-4 Global Hawk functional manager, and chief of predator operations and operations.

Sidari became a field grade officer when he was promoted to major on October 1, 2005, by which time he was assigned at the National Airborne Operations Center at Offutt Air Force Base, Nebraska. After that assignment, he studied for a year at Air Command and Staff College. From September 2007 to July 2009, he was the 390th Intelligence Squadron's director of operations. He was then assigned to the Joint Staff for two years as counter-terrorism operations officer. In July 2011, he took command of 6th Intelligence Squadron at Osan Air Base, South Korea. After his two-year command tour, he was assigned to Air Force Space Command, and there he served as chief of special programs integration division and as executive officer to Major General David J. Buck.

In July 2015, Sidari pursued his senior development education at the Joint Advanced Warfighting School of the National Defense University. After his schooling, he went back to the Joint Staff as the chief of the assessments and plants division where he was promoted to colonel on November 1, 2016. After his tour in the Joint Staff, he became the vice commander of the 480th Intelligence, Surveillance and Reconnaissance Wing for two years. In June 2020, he was assigned as director of intelligence, surveillance, and reconnaissance of Headquarters, United States Space Force in Peterson Air Force Base, Colorado, which was later redesignated to Space Operations Command.

Sidari transferred to the United States Space Force after his nomination was approved on June 24, 2021. In May 2022, he was nominated and confirmed for promotion to brigadier general. By August 2022, he was frocked, and he was promoted to brigadier general on October 2, 2022.

In 2022, Sidari became the director of intelligence of the United States Space Command.

== Awards and decorations ==
Sidari is the recipient of the following awards:

Senior Aircrew Badge

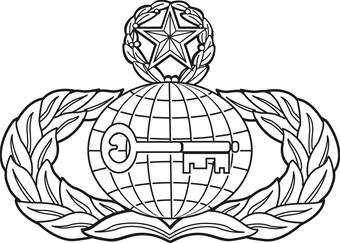

Master Intelligence Badge

Office of the Joint Chiefs of Staff Identification Badge

United States Space Command Badge

Defense Superior Service Medal
Legion of Merit with one bronze oak leaf cluster
Defense Meritorious Service Medal
Meritorious Service Medal with four bronze oak leaf cluster
Aerial Achievement Medal
Joint Service Commendation Medal with one bronze oak leaf cluster
Air Force Commendation Medal with two bronze oak leaf clusters
Air Force Achievement Medal with one bronze oak leaf cluster
Joint Meritorious Unit Award with one bronze oak leaf cluster
Air Force Meritorious Unit Award with one bronze oak leaf cluster
Air Force Outstanding Unit Award with one bronze oak leaf cluster
Air Force Organizational Excellence Award with one bronze oak leaf cluster
National Defense Service Medal with one bronze service star
Armed Forces Expeditionary Medal with one bronze service star
Kosovo Campaign Medal
Global War on Terrorism Expeditionary Medal
Global War on Terrorism Service Medal
Korea Defense Service Medal
Remote Combat Effects Campaign Medal
Nuclear Deterrence Operations Service Medal
Air Force Overseas Short Tour Service Ribbon
Air Force Overseas Long Tour Service Ribbon
Air Force Expeditionary Service Ribbon
Air Force Longevity Service Award with one silver oak leaf cluster
Air Force Small Arms Expert Marksmanship Ribbon
Air Force Training Ribbon
NATO Medal (Yugoslavia) with one bronze service star

== Dates of promotion ==
Rank	Branch	Date
Second Lieutenant	Air Force	June 1, 1995
First Lieutenant	Air Force	June 1, 1997
Captain	Air Force	June 1, 1999
Major	Air Force	October 1, 2005
Lieutenant Colonel	Air Force	August 1, 2010
Colonel	Air Force	November 1, 2016
Colonel	Space Force	~June 24, 2021
Brigadier General	Space Force	October 2, 2022
Major General	Space Force	November 3, 2025

== Writings ==
- Offensive Cyber Operations: The Need for Policy to Contend with the Future (PDF) (M.S.). National Defense University. 2016.

Military offices
Preceded by Scott A. Roth	Vice Commander of the 480th Intelligence, Surveillance, and Reconnaissance Wing; 2018–2020	Succeeded by Tyler Morton
Preceded by Suzanne M. Streeter	Director of Intelligence, Surveillance, and Reconnaissance of Space Operations Command; 2020–2022	Succeeded by Chandler P. Atwood
Preceded by Gregory Gagnon	Director of Intelligence of the United States Space Command; 2022–2025	Succeeded by Chandler P. Atwood
Preceded by Gregory Gagnon	Deputy Chief of Space Operations for Intelligence; 2025–present	Incumbent
