= Kimberly Crider =

Retired U.S. Air Force general

Kimberly A. Crider
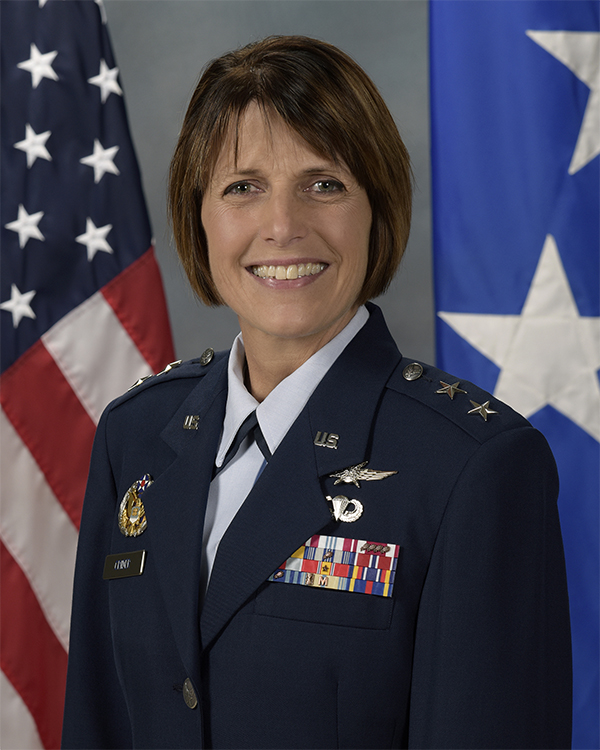
- Military career
- Allegiance: United States
- Branch: United States Air Force
- Service years: 1986–2021
- Rank: Major general
- Awards: Legion of Merit; Defense Meritorious Service Medal

Kimberly A. Crider is a retired United States Air Force major general who last served as the mobilization assistant to the Chief of Space Operations of the United States Space Force. Concurrently, she was also the chief technology and innovation officer of the Space Force. Prior to serving in her last position, she was the Air Force Chief Data Officer.

== Awards and decorations ==
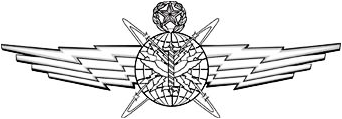

Badge	Command Cyberspace Operators Badge		
Badge	Basic Parachutist Badge		
Badge	Senior Acquisition and Financial Management Badge		
1st row	Legion of Merit	Defense Meritorious Service Medal	Meritorious Service Medal with four bronze oak leaf clusters
2nd row	Air Force Commendation Medal with two oak leaf clusters	Air Force Achievement Medal with oak leaf cluster	Air Force Organizational Excellence Award
3rd row	Air Force Recognition Ribbon with oak leaf cluster	National Defense Service Medal with one bronze service star	Global War on Terrorism Service Medal
4th row	Air Force Longevity Service Award with one silver and two bronze oak leaf clusters	Armed Forces Reserve Medal with bronze Hourglass device and bronze "M" device	Air Force Training Ribbon
Badge	Headquarters Air Force Badge		

Military offices
Preceded by ???	Chief Data Officer of the United States Air Force; 2017–2018	Succeeded by Eileen M. Vidrine
Preceded by Catherine A. Chilton	Mobilization assistant to the commander of the Air Force Space Command; 2018–2019	Command redesignated
New title	Mobilization Assistant to the Chief of Space Operations and Acting Chief Technology and Innovation Officer of the United States Air Force; 2019–2021	Succeeded by John M. Olson
