= John M. Olson (general) =

U.S. Air Force general

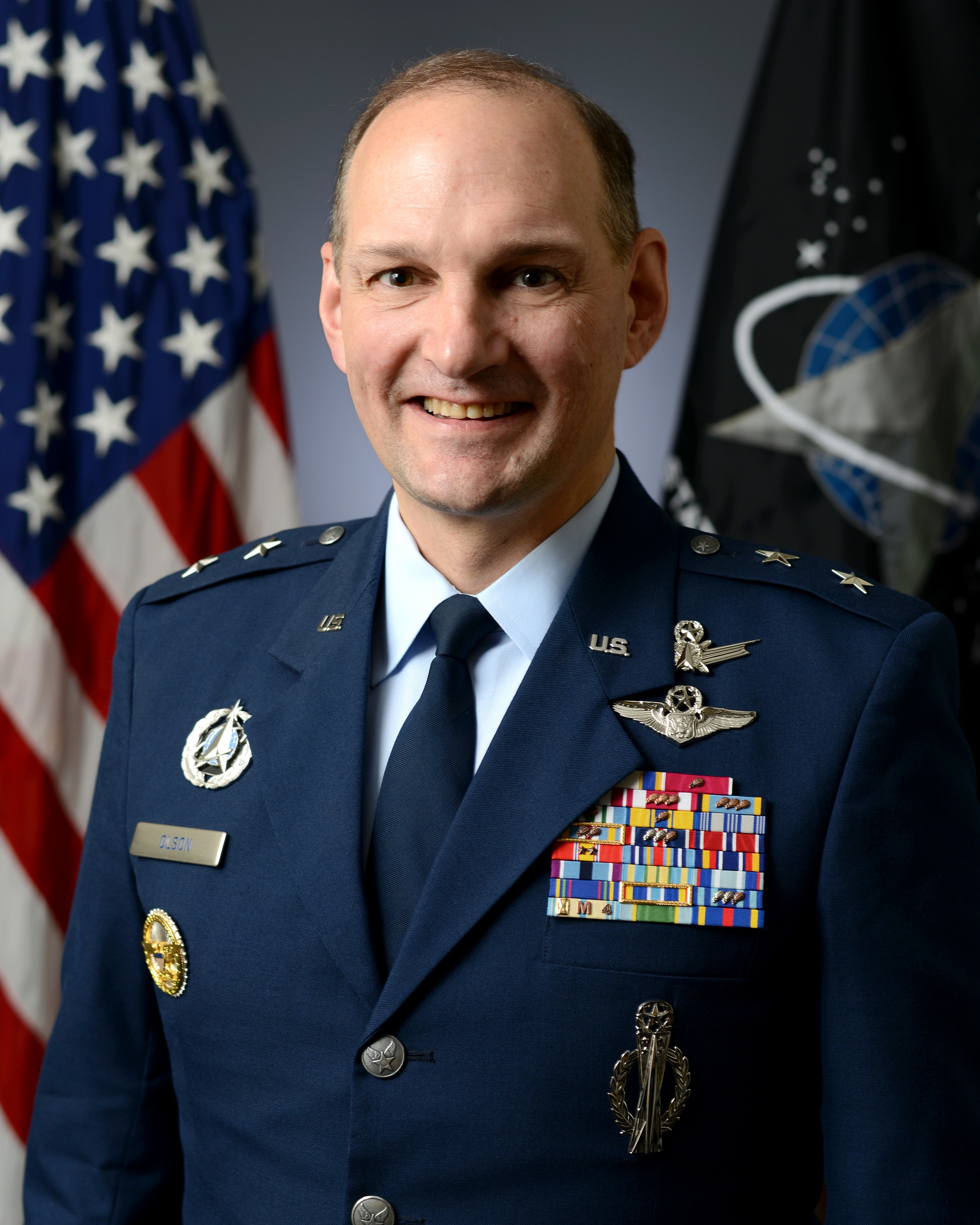
- Official portrait, 2024
- Born: August 28, 1969 (age 57); Eau Claire, Wisconsin
- Military career
- Allegiance: United States
- Branch: United States Air Force
- Service years: 1992–2024
- Rank: Major General
- Awards: Legion of Merit (2)

John Michael Olson (born August 28, 1969) is a retired United States Air Force major general who served as the mobilization assistant to the chief of space operations and the Space Force lead for JADC2 and ABMS. He previously served as the chief data and artificial intelligence officer of the Department of the Air Force.

In July 2022, Olson was nominated for promotion to major general.

Military offices
Preceded by ???	Mobilization Assistant to the Commander of the Air Force Nuclear Weapons Center; 2017–2019	Succeeded by Paul E. Knapp
Preceded by Jay Scott Goldstein	Mobilization Assistant to the Commander of the Twenty-Fourth Air Force; 2019	Command redesignated
New office	Mobilization Assistant to the Commander of the Sixteenth Air Force; 2019–2021	Succeeded by Jeffrey F. Hill
Preceded by Kimberly Crider	Deputy Chief of Space Operations for Technology and Innovation of the United States Space Force; Acting; 2021	Succeeded by Lisa Costa
Preceded by Eileen M. Vidrine	Chief Data and Artificial Intelligence Officer of the Department of the Air Force; 2022–2023	Succeeded by Eileen M. Vidrine
Preceded by Kimberly Crider	Mobilization Assistant to the Chief of Space Operations and Space Force lead for JADC2 and ABMS; 2021–2024	Succeeded by Robert Claude
