= James V. Hartinger =

United States Air Force general

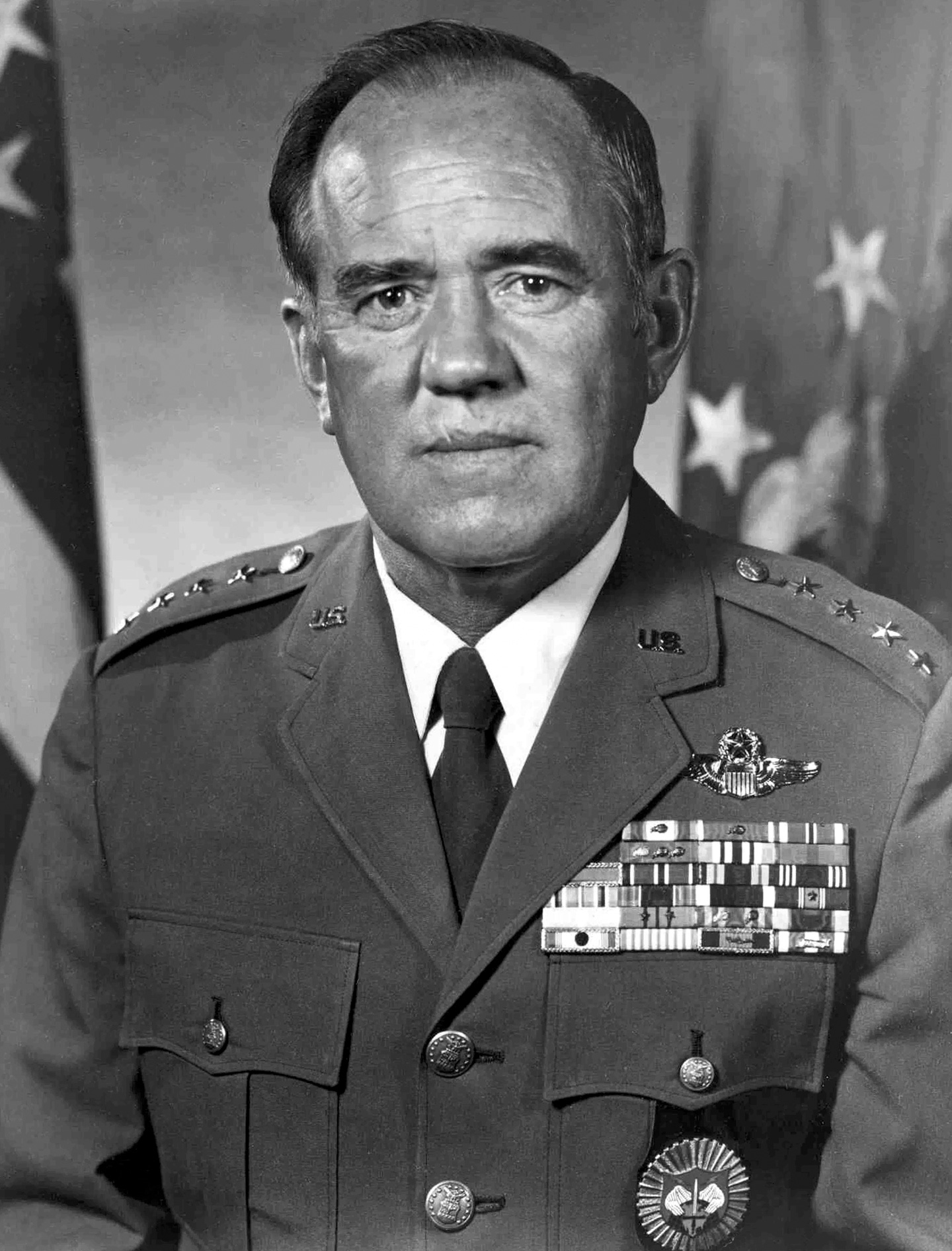
- General James Vincent Hartinger
- Born: April 17, 1925; Middleport, Ohio
- Died: October 9, 2000 (aged 75); Colorado Springs, Colorado
- Military career
- Allegiance: United States
- Branch: United States Army; United States Air Force
- Service years: 1943–1949 (Army); 1949–1984 (Air Force)
- Rank: General
- Commands: North American Aerospace Defense Command; 9th Air Force; 12th Air Force; 23rd Tactical Fighter Wing
- Conflicts: World War II; Korean War; Vietnam War
- Awards: Defense Distinguished Service Medal; Air Force Distinguished Service Medal (2); Legion of Merit (2); Distinguished Flying Cross; Air Medal (9)

James Vincent Hartinger (April 17, 1925 – October 9, 2000) was a United States Air Force general who served as Commander in Chief, North American Air Defense Command from 1980 to 1981; Commander in Chief, North American Aerospace Defense Command from 1981 to 1982; and North American Aerospace Defense Command/Commander, Air Force Space Command from 1982 to 1984. He was a command pilot with more than 5,000 flying hours and was the first recipient of the Master Space Badge.

== Early life and education ==
Hartinger was born on April 17, 1925, in Middleport, Ohio, where he graduated from high school in 1943. He received a Bachelor of Science degree from the United States Military Academy in 1949, and a master's degree in business administration from the George Washington University, Washington, D.C., in 1963. He is also a graduate of Squadron Officer School at Maxwell Air Force Base, Alabama, in 1955 and the Industrial College of the Armed Forces at Fort Lesley J. McNair, Washington, D.C., in 1966.

== Military career ==
Hartinger was drafted into the United States Army in July 1943 and attained the grade of sergeant while serving in the infantry. Following World War II he entered West Point and, upon graduation in 1949, was commissioned a second lieutenant in the United States Air Force.

Hartinger attended pilot training at Randolph Air Force Base, Texas, and Williams Air Force Base, Arizona, where he graduated in August 1950. He then was assigned as a jet fighter pilot with the 36th Fighter-Bomber Wing at Fürstenfeldbruck Air Base, Germany. In December 1952, he joined the 474th Fighter-Bomber Wing at Kunsan Air Base, South Korea. While there he flew his first combat missions in F-84 Thunderjets.

Returning to Williams Air Force Base in July 1953, Hartinger served as a gunnery instructor with the 3526th Pilot Training Squadron. Hartinger then transferred to Stewart Air Force Base, New York, in August 1954 as a fighter pilot and air operations officer in the 331st Fighter-Interceptor Squadron. During this period he attended Squadron Officer School.

In July 1958, Hartinger began a four-year tour of duty in the Directorate of Requirements, Headquarters United States Air Force, Washington, D.C. After receiving his master's degree in June 1963, he was assigned to Hickam Air Force Base, Hawaii, in the Directorate of Plans, Headquarters Pacific Air Forces.

Following graduation from the Industrial College of the Armed Forces in June 1966, Hartinger completed F-4C Phantom II replacement training with the 43rd Tactical Fighter Squadron at MacDill Air Force Base, Florida. From December 1966 to December 1967, he was assigned to Headquarters 7th Air Force at Tan Son Nhut Air Base, Republic of Vietnam. He completed more than 100 aerial combat missions while assigned in the Republic of Vietnam.

In 1968, Hartinger was the F-111 test director at Nellis Air Force Base, Nevada, and then took command of the famed "Flying Tigers," the 23rd Tactical Fighter Wing, flying F-105 Thunderchiefs at McConnell Air Force Base, Kansas. He became deputy chief of staff for plans at North American Air Defense Command headquarters, Ent Air Force Base, Colorado, in June 1970. He then moved to Maxwell Air Force Base, Alabama in May 1973 as commandant of the Air War College.

From July 1975 until June 1978, Hartinger was commander of the Tactical Air Command's 9th Air Force with headquarters at Shaw Air Force Base, South Carolina. He then was commander of Tactical Air Command's 12th Air Force with headquarters at Bergstrom Air Force Base, Texas. He became commander in chief of North American Aerospace Defense Command in January 1980.

== Awards and decorations ==
Hartinger's military decorations and awards include the Defense Distinguished Service Medal, Air Force Distinguished Service Medal with oak leaf cluster, Legion of Merit with oak leaf cluster, Distinguished Flying Cross, Air Medal with eight oak leaf clusters, Air Force Commendation Medal, Combat Readiness Medal and the Republic of Korea Order of National Security Merit Tung II.

Hartinger also received an honorary doctor of military science from Norwich University in Vermont in 1982, and an honorary doctor of laws from the University of Akron in 1983. In 1975, he was inducted into the National Lacrosse Hall of Fame. The National Defense Industrial Association named the Hartinger Medal after him, which is presented annually to an individual who made a significant contribution to the military space mission of the United States. In 2016, Hartinger was inducted posthumously into the Colorado Space Hall of Fame.

== Personal life ==
During World War II, Hartinger became friends with the musician Hardrock Gunter, who was in his unit, and they remained close until Hartinger's death on October 9, 2000.

== In popular culture ==
Barry Corbin's character role in WarGames was based on Hartinger.
