= Lisa Costa =

US Space Force senior leader

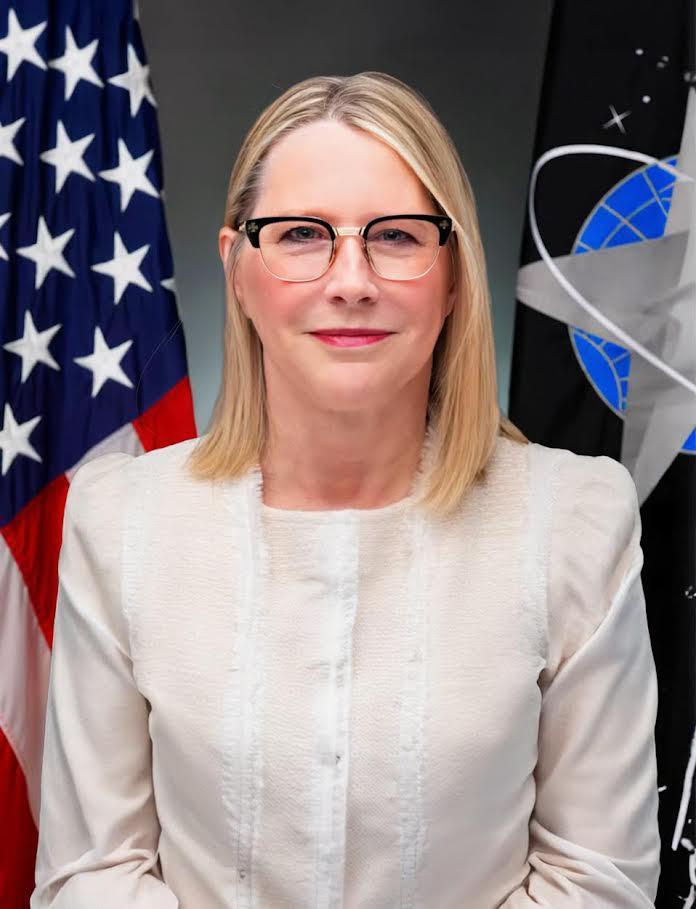
- Official portrait, 2024

Deputy Chief of Space Operations for Technology and Innovation of the United States Space Force
- Incumbent
- Assumed office August 2021
- Chief: John W. Raymond
- Preceded by: John M. Olson (acting)

Personal details
- Education: Rollins College (BS); Tampa College (MBA); Union Institute & University (PhD)

Lisa A. Costa is an American computer scientist and defense official serving as the deputy chief of space operations for technology and logistics of the United States Space Force since 2021. She is its chief technology and innovation officer. Costa was the chief information officer of the United States Special Operations Command from 2018 to 2021.

== Early life and education ==
Costa earned a B.S. in mathematics computer science from Rollins College in 1986. While attending school, she worked full time. She worked in the corporate computer center of the Harris Corporation. At the age of 18, she became a junior programmer with a government contractor. Costa received a M.B.A. from Tampa College in 1990. In 1993, Costa completed a doctorate of computer science and engineering management from the Union Institute & University.

== Career ==
Costa was the director of the Non-Traditional Information and Knowledge Exploitation Cell in Tampa, Florida from September 2001 to August 2010. From September 2010 to September 2013, she was the executive director of enterprise integration of the Mitre Corporation's National Security Engineering Center. Costa was the director of counter weapons of mass destruction and violent extremism from September 2013 to March 2017. In March 2017, she joined PlanteRisk as its vice president of intelligence and chief scientist. In March 2018, she became the senior director of innovation and technology at Engility. In October 2018, Costa became the director of communications systems and the chief information officer of the United States Special Operations Command. While there, where she ran the fourth largest information technology enterprise in the United States Department of Defense. With over 95,000 users in over 140 countries, she was accountable for the technical portions of no fail missions for elite military units and operations. She directly controlled and executed a >$1.2B per year budget which included global cloud infrastructure, mobility, satellite and terrestrial communications, and devsecops supporting just in time artificial intelligence at the edge. She advised on the spending of ~$13.2B per year.

In November 2020, she joined the board of directors of CarParts.com. In September 2021, Costa became the chief technology officer and innovation officer of the United States Space Force.

== Awards and decorations ==
Costa is the recipient of the following awards:

- 1993 Best Paper Award in Technical Track – Evaluation of X-Based Desktops
- 1998 Special Recognition Award – Integrated Survey Program
- 1998 Program Recognition Award – Collaborative Contingency Targeting
- 2000 MITRE Technology Innovation Director’s Award
- 2001 MITRE Senior Vice President General Manager Award
- 2002 Special Operations Joint Interagency Collaboration Center
- 2002 AFCEA International Meritorious Service Award
- 2002 MITRE Corporation President’s Knowledge Management Award – Intelligence Analysis Cell Initiative
- 2003 AFCEA International Meritorious Service Award
- 2004 AFCEA International Meritorious Services Award – Engineering
- 2005 AFCEA International Commendation Award – Mid-Career Intelligence Contributions
- 2008 Special Programs Award – Working in the Shadows
- 2011 Program Recognition Award – Social Network Analysis Reachback Capability
- 2011 Director DIA Award – Intelligence Transformation in Afghanistan
- 2013 Officer’s Award – Scientific Contribution to MITRE’s Technical Stature
- 2013 Officer’s Award – Development and transition of Research into Operational Capability
- 2014 Officer’s Award – Leadership in Integration
- 2015 Officer’s Award – Delivering Transformational Solutions that Drive Mission Success
- 2016 Rollings College Alumni Achievement Award
- 2020 Federal 100 (FED100) Award
- 2021 Joint Chiefs of Staff Joint Meritorious Civilian Service Award
- 2022 Washington 100 (WASH100)
- 2022 Government CTO of the Year
- 2022 Best IT Bosses to Work For
- 2023 Science and Engineering Award, Space Force Association

Military offices
Preceded by John M. Olson	Deputy Chief of Space Operations for Technology and Innovation of the United States Space Force; 2021–present	Incumbent
