= Timothy Sejba =

U.S. Space Force general officer

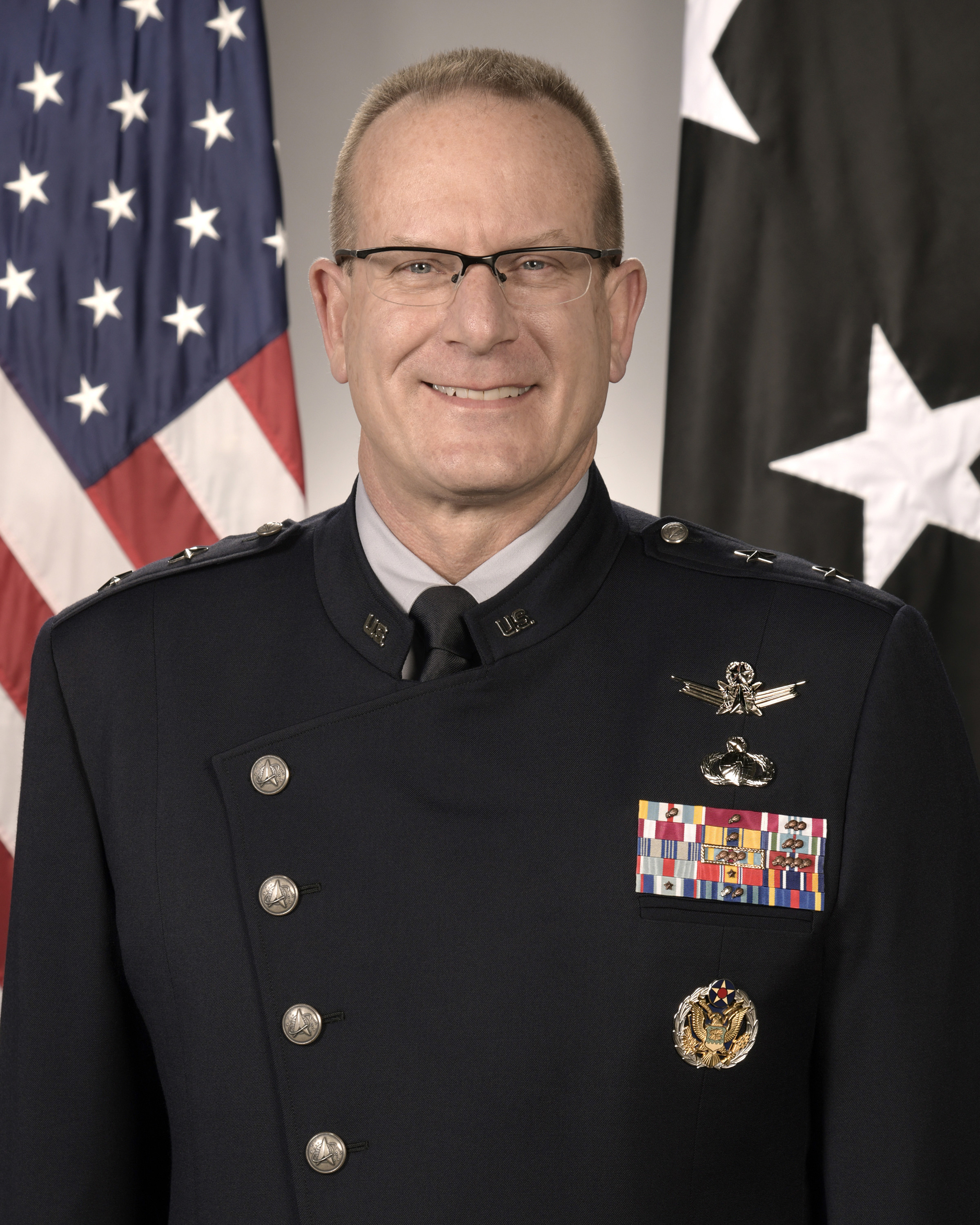
- Official portrait, 2024
- Born: March 7, 1972 (age 54); Miami, Florida, U.S.
- Alma mater: University of Minnesota Duluth (BS): San José State University (MBA)
- Military career
- Allegiance: United States
- Branch: United States Air Force: United States Space Force
- Service years: 1995–2021 (Air Force): 2021–present (Space Force)
- Rank: Major General
- Commands: BMC3 Directorate, SSC: SZ Directorate, SSC; Enterprise Corps, SSC; Development Corps, SMC; Advanced Systems and Development Directorate; Space Rapid Capabilities Office (acting); Technology Operations Group, Communications Directorate, NRO
- Awards: Defense Superior Service Medal (2): Legion of Merit (2)

Timothy Alan Sejba (born March 7, 1972) is a United States Space Force major general who serves as the special assistant to the vice chief of space operations. He previously served as the commander of Space Training and Readiness Command. He has also served as program executive officer for both the Space Domain Awareness and Combat Power (SDACP); and Battle Management, Command, Control, and Communications (BMC3) directorates and acting director of the Space Rapid Capabilities Office from 2018 to 2019.

In January 2021, Sejba was nominated for promotion to brigadier general in the United States Air Force and his nomination was confirmed, but in June 2021, he was nominated for transfer to the Space Force as a colonel. In December 2021, he was again nominated for promotion to brigadier general, this time in the Space Force, and was promoted on December 21, 2021, a week after his confirmation.

In July 2023, Sejba was nominated for promotion to major general.

== Education ==
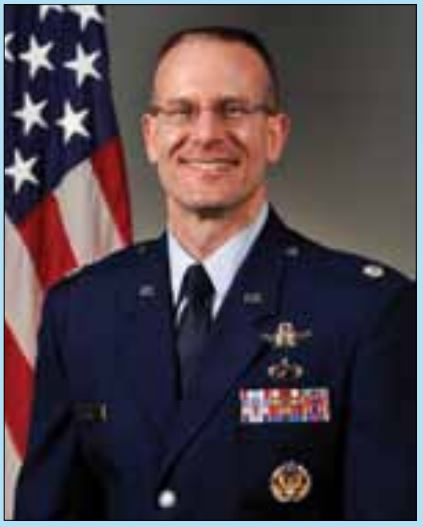
Sejba as a lieutenant colonel.

- 1995 Distinguished Graduate, Air Force Reserve Officer Training Corps, Detachment 420, Duluth, Minn.
- 1995 Bachelor of Computer Engineering, University of Minnesota-Duluth, Duluth, Minn.
- 2001 Masters in Business Administration, San Jose State University, San Jose, Calif.
- 2001 Squadron Officer School (Correspondence), Maxwell AFB, Ala.
- 2002 Squadron Officer School (Residence), Maxwell AFB, Ala.
- 2003 California Institute of Technology Systems Engineering Certificate, Los Angeles AFB, Calif.
- 2005 Air Command and Staff College (Correspondence), Maxwell AFB, Ala.
- 2006 Joint Forces Staff College, Norfolk, Va.
- 2009 Air Force Fellow (Residence), United States Senate, Washington, D.C.
- 2012 Air War College (Correspondence), Maxwell AFB, Ala.
- 2013 Dwight D. Eisenhower School for National Security and Resource Strategy, National Defense University, Ft. McNair, Washington, D.C.
- 2013 Senior Acquisition Course, Ft. McNair, Washington, D.C.
- 2018 U.S. Air Force Enterprise Seminar, Kenan-Flagler Business School, University of North Carolina, Chapel Hill, N.C.
- 2019 Executive Program Managers Course, Defense Acquisition University, Ft. Belvoir, Va.

== Assignments ==
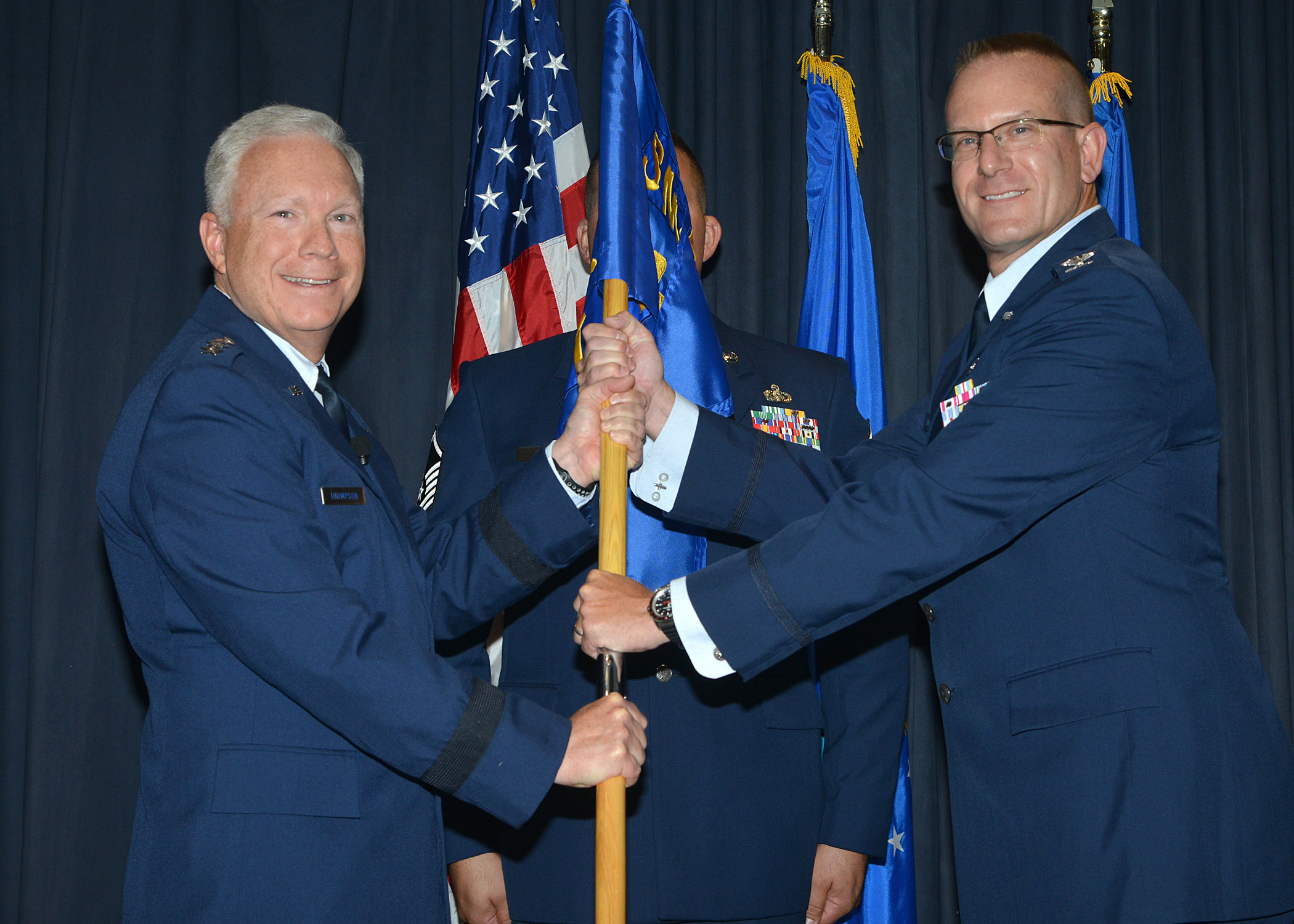
Sejba receives the Advanced Systems and Development Directorate guidon from Lt Gen Thompson during a change of command ceremony, July 2018.

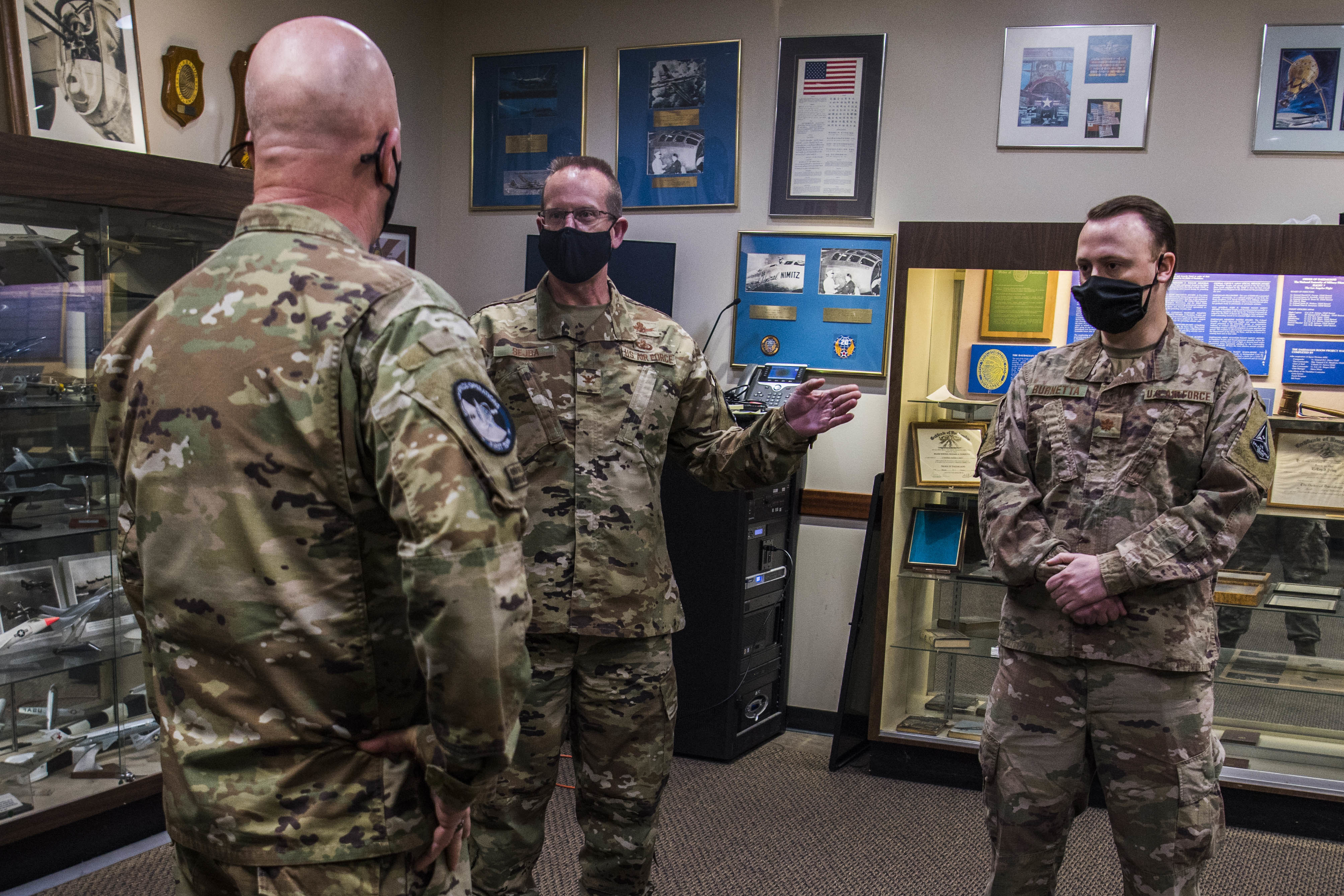
Gen Raymond talks to Sejba in April 2021 during a visit to SMC.

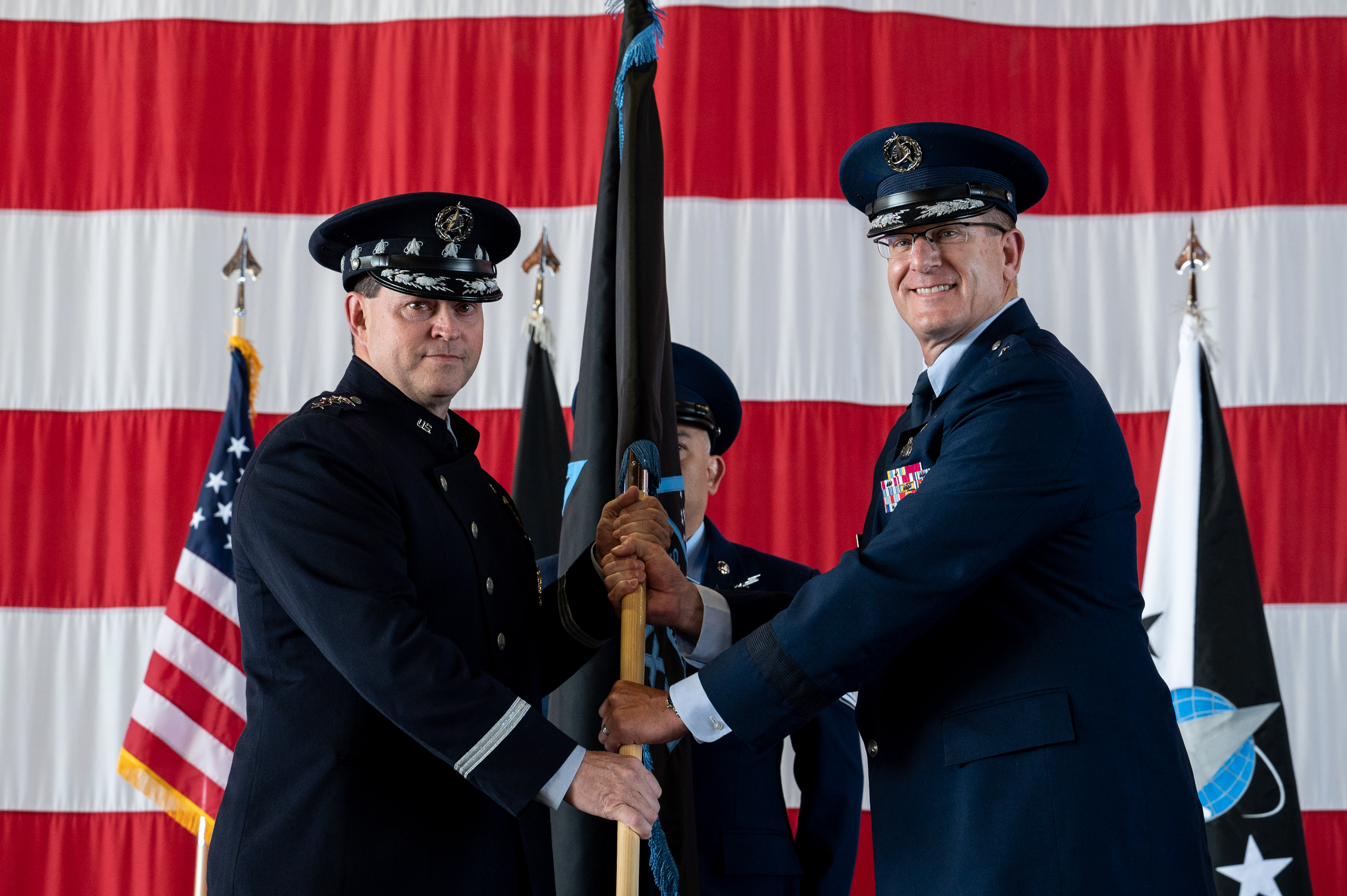
Sejba assumes command of Space Training and Readiness Command, 2023

1. June 1995–October 1997, Master Control Station Systems Engineer, and Chief, Command Section, 2nd Space Operations Squadron, Falcon AFB, Colo.
2. October 1997–March 2002, Flight Commander, Chief, Standardization and Evaluation, Senior FlightCommander, and Executive Officer, Operating Division Four – National Reconnaissance Office, Onizuka AFS, Calif.
3. March 2002–July 2005, Project Manager, Space-Based Systems, and Deputy Program Manager, Space Superiority Materiel Wing, Space and Missile Systems Center, Los Angeles AFB, Calif.
4. July 2005–June 2008, Chief, Position, Navigation and Timing Operations, and Executive Officer, USSTRATCOM Joint Functional Component Command, Global Strike and Integration; Chief, Special Programs, USSTRATCOM/J32, Offutt AFB, Neb.
5. July 2008–December 2008, Air Force Fellow, AF/A9, Pentagon, Washington, D.C.
6. January 2009–December 2009, Air Force Legislative Fellow for Senator Mary Landrieu, Louisiana, United States Senate, Washington, D.C.
7. January 2010–June 2010, Space, Nuclear and Cyber Congressional Liaison, Pentagon, Washington, D.C.
8. July 2010–June 2012, Commander, Space Operations Squadron, Aerospace Data Facility-Southwest, National Reconnaissance Office, Las Cruces, N.M.
9. August 2012–June 2013, Student, Dwight D. Eisenhower School for National Security and Resource Strategy, National Defense University, Ft. McNair, Washington, D.C.
10. June 2013–June 2014, Chief, Weapons and Capabilities Office, Defense Threat Reduction Agency, Eglin AFB, Fla.
11. June 2014–July 2016, Commander, Technology Operations Group, Communications Directorate, National Reconnaissance Office, Chantilly, Va.
12. July 2016–July 2018, Deputy Director, Military Satellite Communications Systems Directorate, Space and Missile Systems Center, Los Angeles AFB, Calif.
13. July 2018–February 2019, Acting Director, Space Rapid Capabilities Office, Kirtland AFB, N.M.
14. July 2018–July 2020, Director, Advanced Systems and Development Directorate, Space and Missile Systems Center, Kirtland AFB, N.M.
15. July 2020–August 2021, Program Executive Officer for Space Development, Space and Missile Systems Center, Los Angeles AFB, Calif.
16. August 2021–March 2022, Program Executive Officer for Space Enterprise and Director Enterprise Corps, Space Systems Command, Los Angeles AFB, Calif.
17. March 2022–July 2023, Program Executive Officer for Space Domain Awareness and Combat Power; Program Executive Officer for Battle Management Command, Control, and Communications, Los Angeles AFB, Calif.
18. July 2023–July 2025, Commander, Space Training and Readiness Command, Peterson Space Force Base, Colorado
19. July 2025–present, Special Assistant to the Vice Chief of Space Operations, Headquarters, U.S. Space Force, Washington, D.C.

== Awards and decorations ==
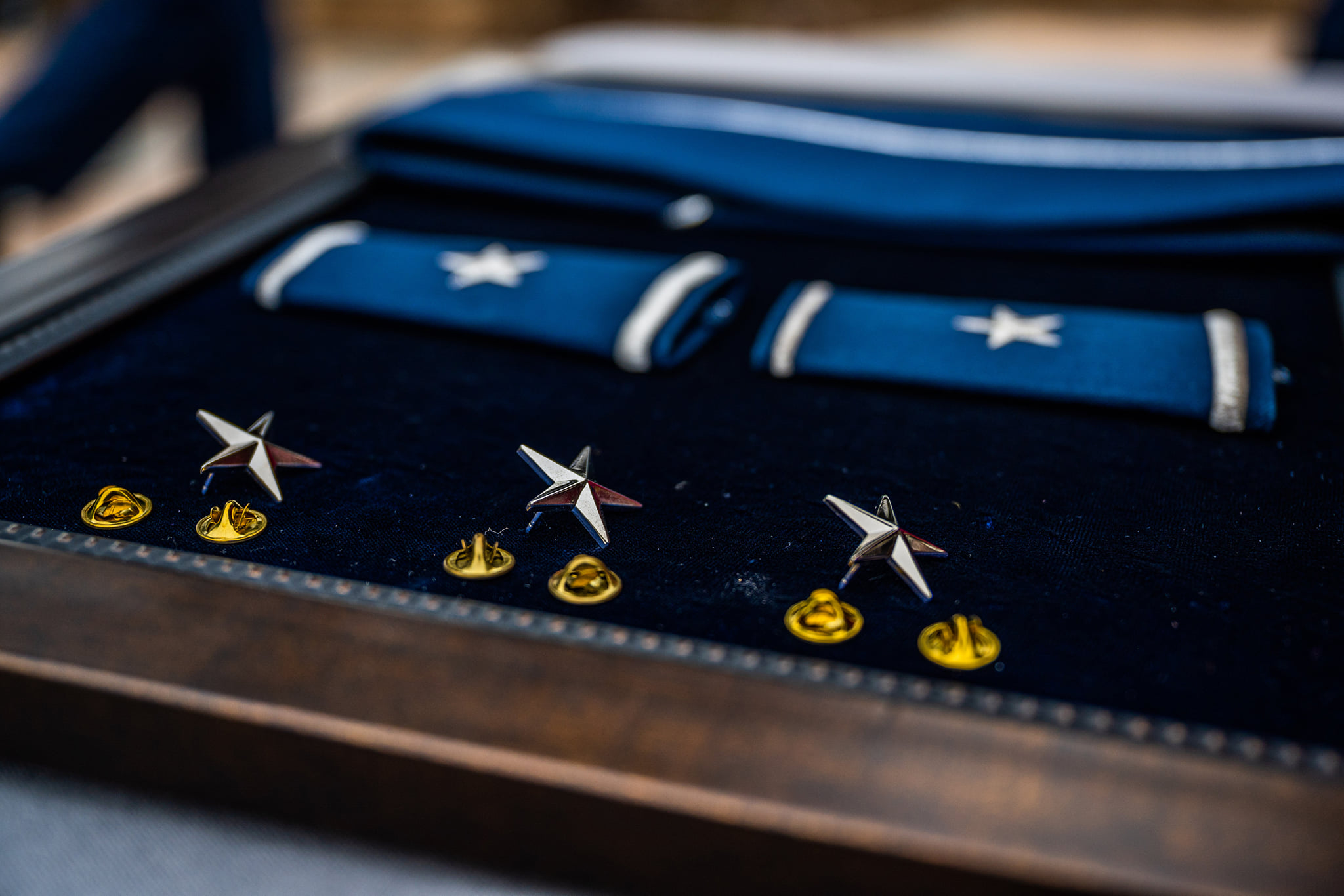
Sejba's shoulder board stars prepared for his promotion ceremony to brigadier general.

Sejba is the recipient of the following awards:

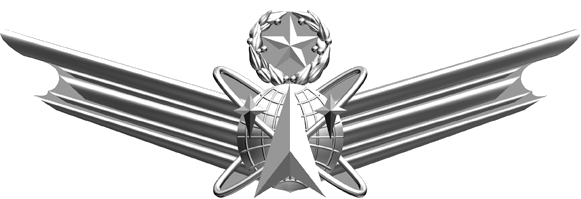
Command Space Operations Badge

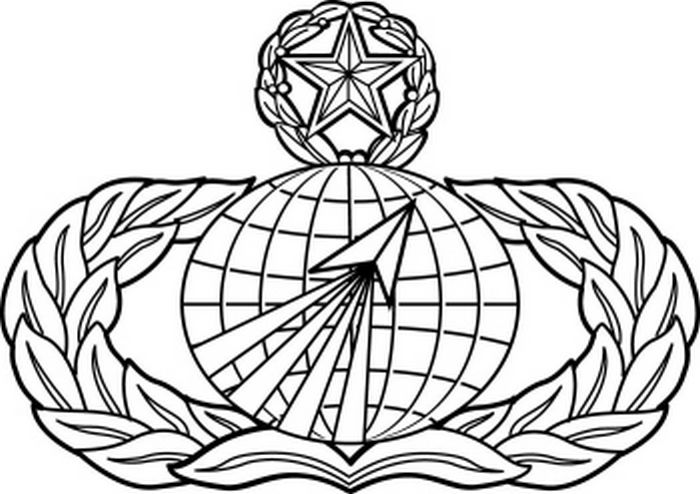

Air Force Master Acquisition and Financial Management Badge

Air Staff Badge

Defense Superior Service Medal with one bronze oak leaf cluster
Legion of Merit with one bronze oak leaf cluster
Defense Meritorious Service Medal with two bronze oak leaf clusters
Meritorious Service Medal
Air Force Commendation Medal with one bronze oak leaf cluster
Joint Service Achievement Medal with two bronze oak leaf clusters
Air Force Achievement Medal
Joint Meritorious Unit Award with three bronze oak leaf clusters
Air Force Organizational Excellence Award with four bronze oak leaf clusters
Air Force Recognition Ribbon
National Defense Service Medal with one bronze service star
Global War on Terrorism Service Medal
Air and Space Campaign Medal with one bronze service star
Air Force Longevity Service Award with one silver and one bronze oak leaf cluster
Air Force Training Ribbon

- 2002 Space and Missile Systems Center CGO of the Year
- 2005 Air Force Engineering Team of the Year
- 2012 NRO Director’s Circle Award for Leadership
- 2014 DoD CIO Team of the Year
- 2018 Secretary Wilson Program Office of the Year

== Dates of promotion ==
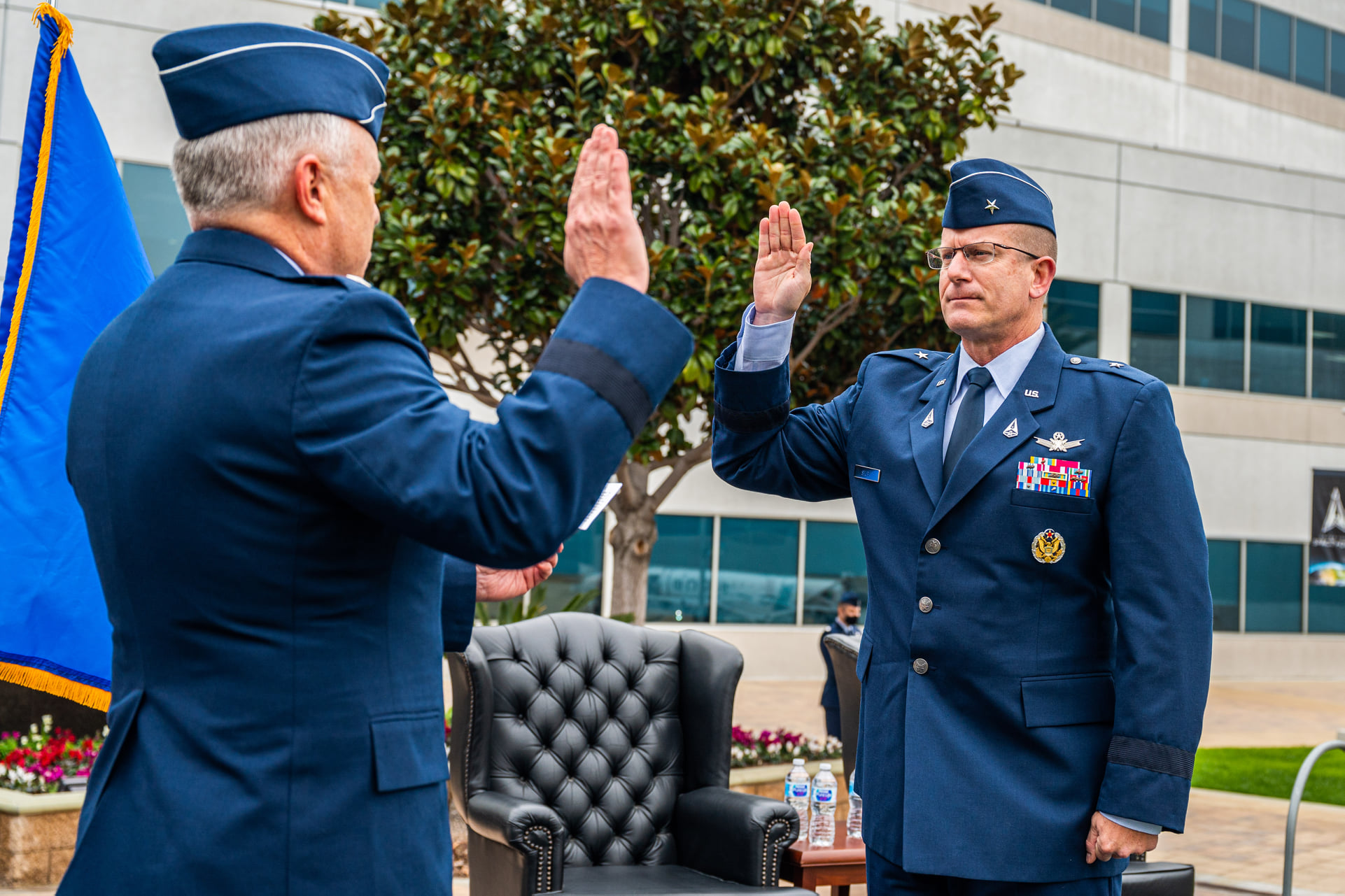
Newly promoted Brig Gen Sejba is sworn in by retired Lt Gen Thompson in a promotion ceremony, January 7, 2022.

Rank	Branch	Date
Second Lieutenant	Air Force	May 31, 1995
First Lieutenant	Air Force	May 31, 1997
Captain	Air Force	May 31, 1999
Major	Air Force	November 1, 2005
Lieutenant Colonel	Air Force	March 1, 2010
Colonel	Air Force	October 1, 2014
Colonel	Space Force	~June 24, 2021
Brigadier General	Space Force	December 15, 2021
Major General	Space Force	December 6, 2023

== Writings ==
- "Deterrence for Space: Is Operationally Responsive Space Part of the Solution?" (PDF). High Frontier: The Journal for Space & Missile Professionals. 6 (3): 39–43. May 2010. Archived from the original (PDF) on November 17, 2016.

Military offices
Preceded by Shahnaz Punjani; Acting	Director of the Space Rapid Capabilities Office; Acting; 2018–2019	Succeeded by Michael W. Roberts
Preceded by John S.R. Anttonen	Director of the Advanced Systems and Development Directorate; 2018–2020	Directorate inactivated
Preceded by Dennis Bythewood	Program Executive Officer for Space Development of the United States Space Force and Director of the Development Corps of the Space and Missile Systems Center; 2020–2021	Succeeded by Brian A. Denaro
Preceded by D. Jason Cothern	Program Executive Officer for Space Enterprise of the United States Space Force and Director of the Enterprise Corps of the Space Systems Command; 2021–2022	Corps inactivated
New office	Program Executive Officer for Space Domain Awareness and Combat Power and Program Executive Officer for Battle Management Command, Control, and Communications of the United States Space Force; 2022–2023	Succeeded by Shannon Pallone
Preceded by Shawn Bratton	Commander of Space Training and Readiness Command; 2023–2025	Succeeded by James E. Smith
