= Leadership of Space Training and Readiness Command =

U.S. Space Force senior officer

This is a list of all commanders of Space Training and Readiness Command and all its historical antecedents, organizations that took its lineage.

== List of commanders ==
Commander of Space Training and Readiness Command
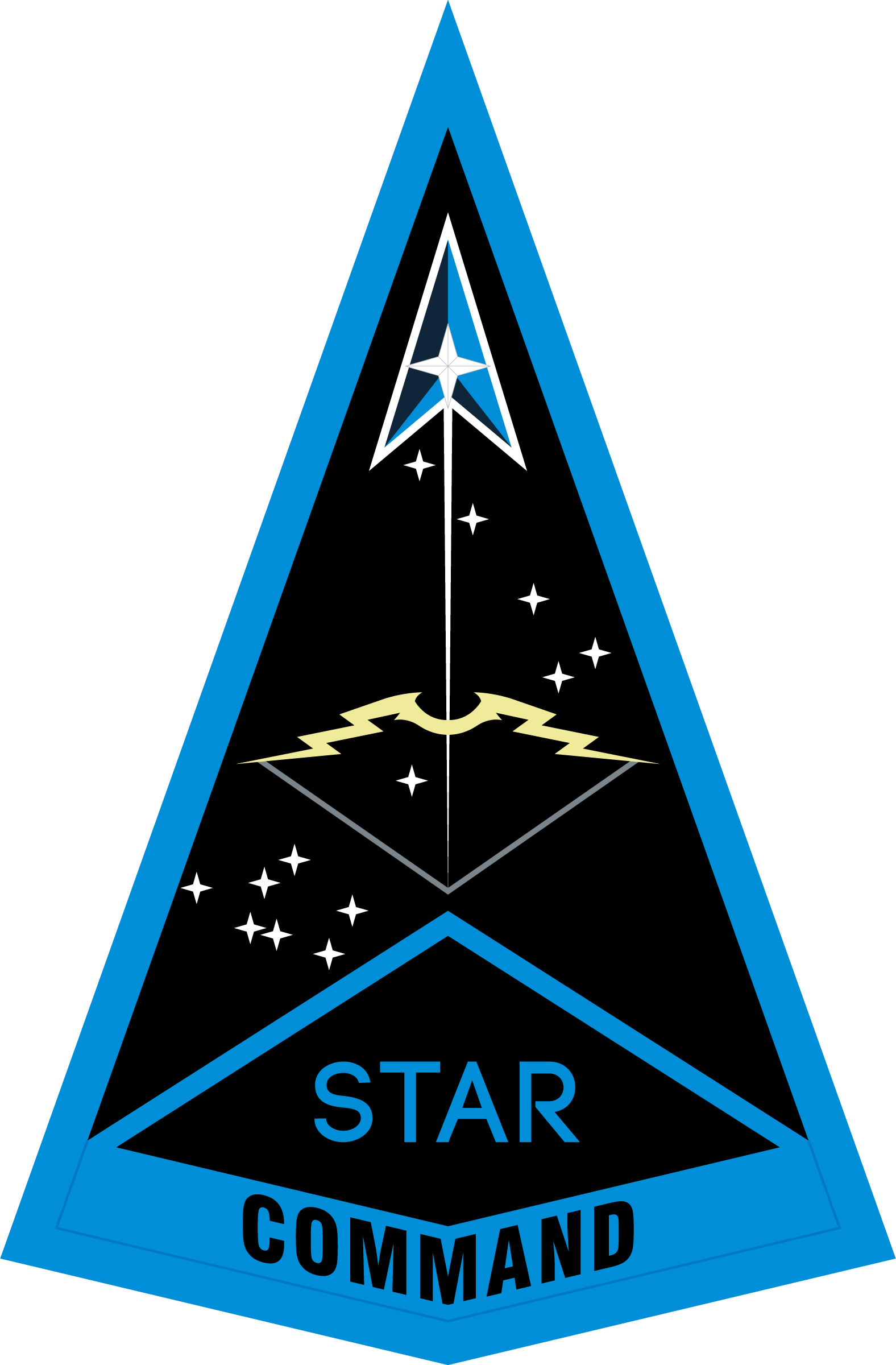
- Space Training and Readiness Command emblem

- Flag of a Space Force major general

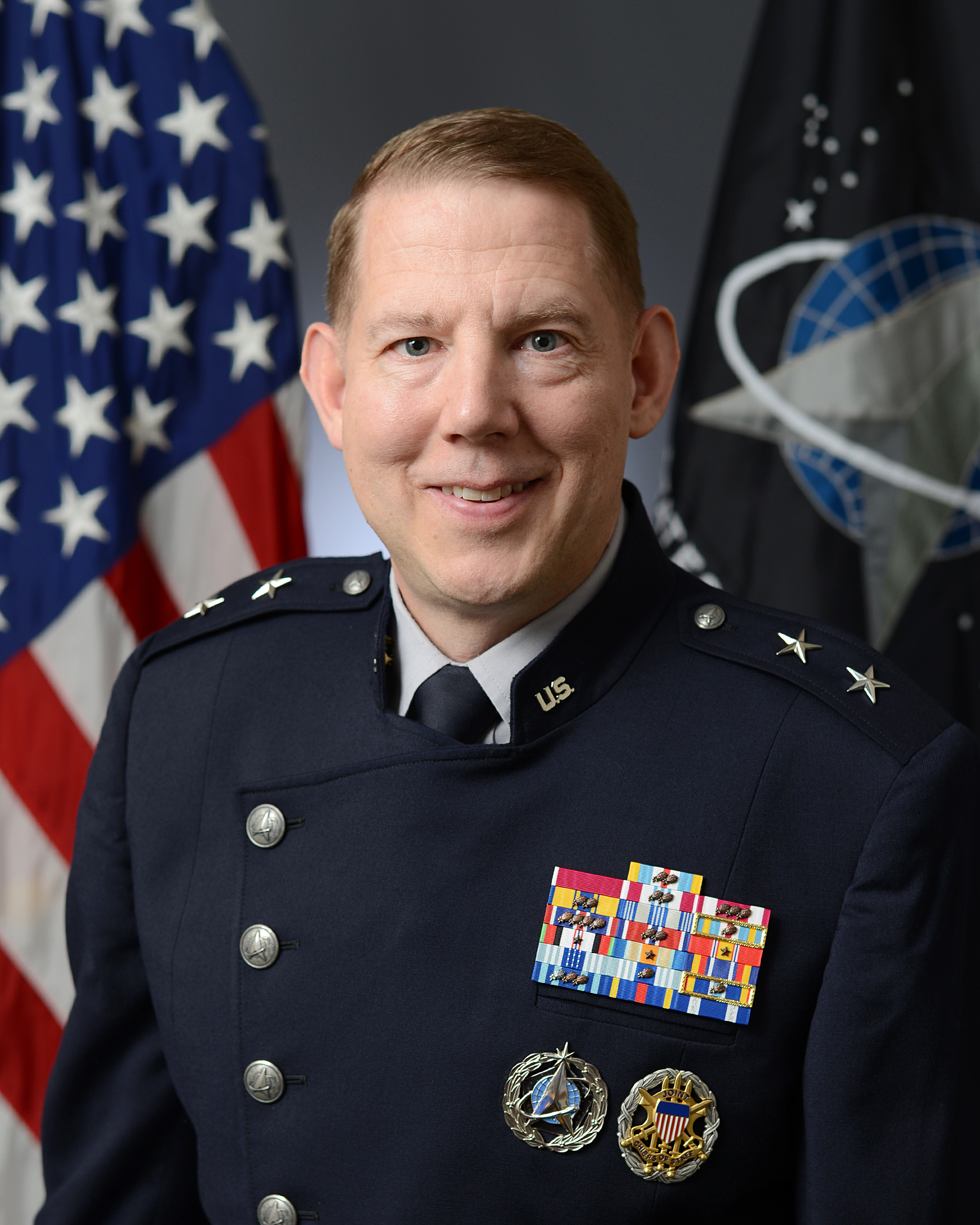
- Incumbent; Major General James E. Smith since 18 July 2025
- United States Space Force
- Reports to: Chief of Space Operations
- Seat: Peterson Space Force Base, Colorado, U.S.
- Precursor: Commander, Space Innovation and Development Center
- First holder: Robert W. Parker
- Deputy: Deputy Commander, Space Training and Readiness Command

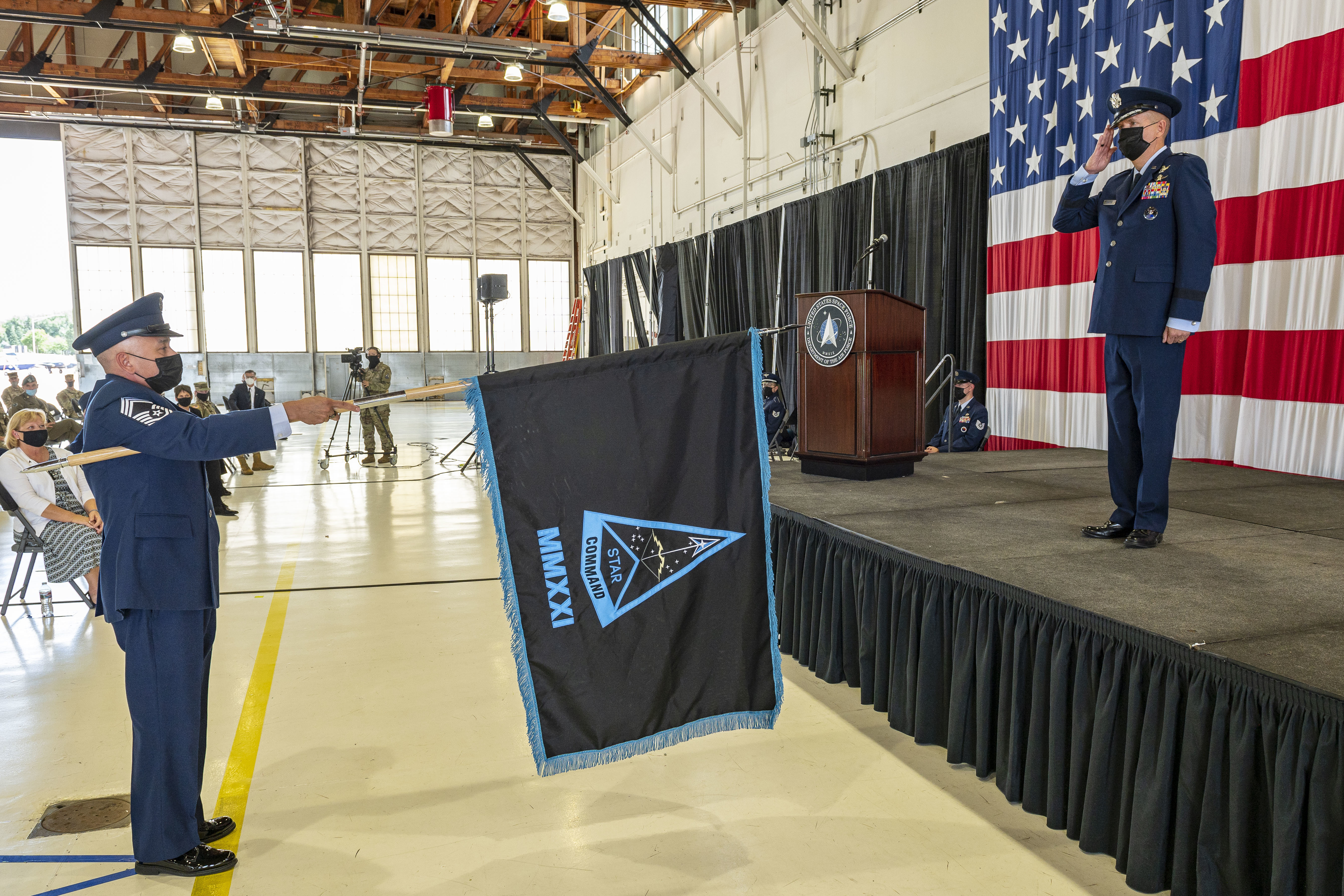
Brig Gen Bratton received his first salute as the first commander of STARCOM, 23 August 2021

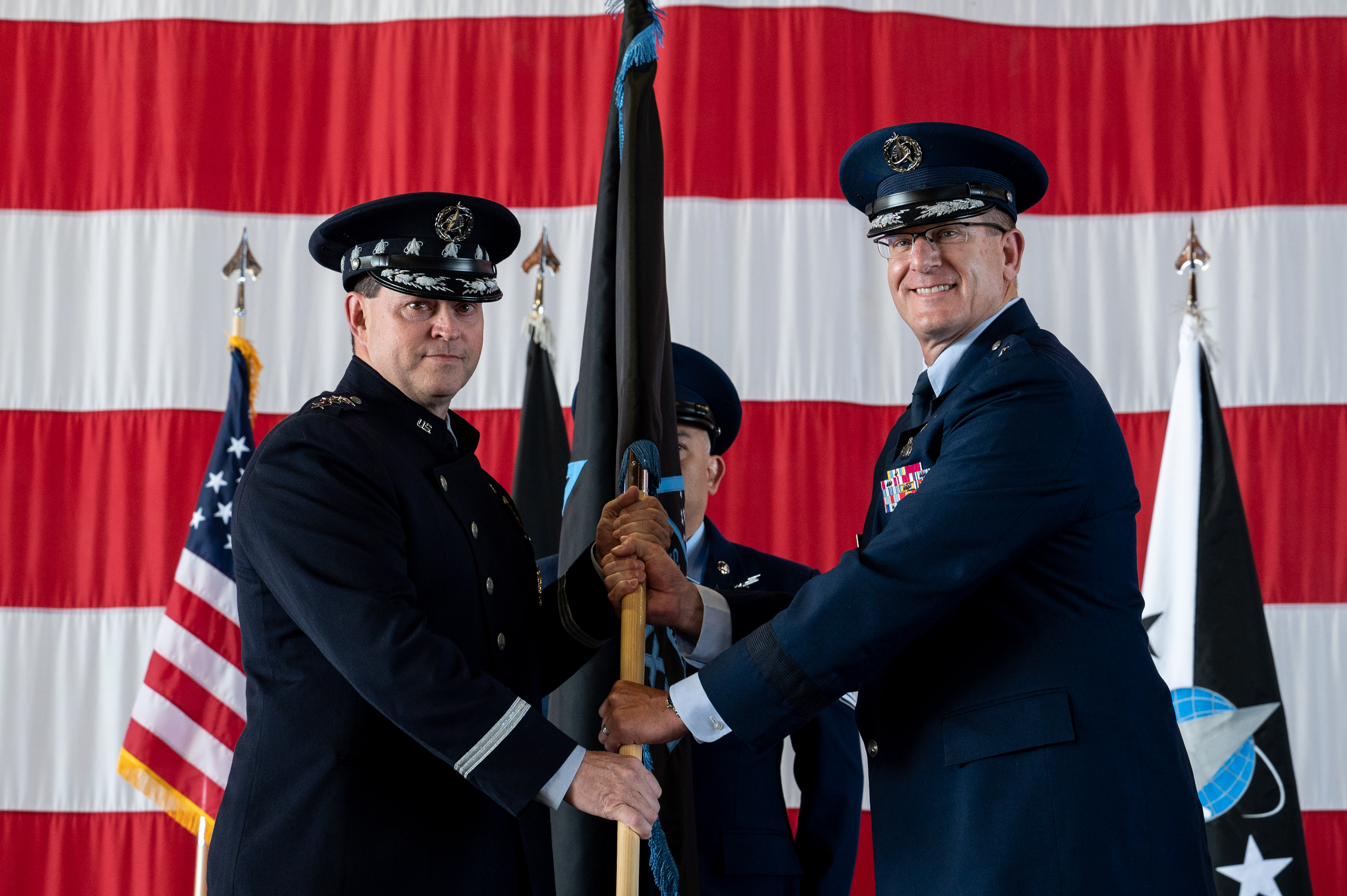
Brig Gen Sejba assumes command of Space Training and Readiness Command, 2023

No.	Commander		Term			Ref
No.	Portrait	Name	Took office	Left office	Duration	Ref
Space Warfare Center
1	Robert W. Parker	Brigadier General; Robert W. Parker	1 November 1993	March 1994	~134 days	
2	David L. Vesely	Brigadier General; David L. Vesely	March 1994	~28 June 1995	~1 year, 92 days	
–	Howard W. Fry Jr.	Colonel; Howard W. Fry Jr. Acting	~28 June 1995	~March 1996	~261 days	
3	Glen W. Moorhead III	Brigadier General; Glen W. Moorhead III	March 1996	July 1998	~2 years, 122 days	
4	William R. Looney III	Brigadier General; William R. Looney III (born 1949)	June 1998	May 1999	~334 days	
5	Gary R. Dylewski	Brigadier General; Gary R. Dylewski	April 1999	June 2000	~1 year, 61 days	
6	Douglas J. Richardson	Brigadier General; Douglas J. Richardson	June 2000	August 2001	~1 year, 61 days	
7	Thomas B. Goslin Jr.	Major General; Thomas B. Goslin Jr.	August 2001	18 April 2002	~246 days	
8	Douglas M. Fraser	Brigadier General; Douglas M. Fraser (born 1950)	18 April 2002	20 June 2003	1 year, 63 days	
9	Daniel J. Darnell	Major General; Daniel J. Darnell	20 June 2003	July 2005	~2 years, 25 days	
10	Larry J. Chodzko	Colonel; Larry J. Chodzko	July 2005	1 March 2006	~229 days	
Space Innovation and Development Center
1	Larry J. Chodzko	Colonel; Larry J. Chodzko	1 March 2006	18 July 2007	~1 year, 139 days	
2	Robert F. Wright Jr.	Colonel; Robert F. Wright Jr.	18 July 2007	March 2010	~2 years, 240 days	
3	Roger M. Vincent	Colonel; Roger M. Vincent	March 2010	July 2012	~2 years, 122 days	
Space Training and Readiness Command
1	Shawn Bratton	Major General; Shawn Bratton (born 1968)	23 August 2021	20 July 2023	1 year, 331 days	
2	Timothy Sejba	Major General; Timothy Sejba (born 1972)	20 July 2023	18 July 2025	1 year, 363 days	
3	James E. Smith	Major General; James E. Smith (born 1973)	18 July 2025	Incumbent	1 year, 93 days	

== List of deputy commanders ==
No.	Deputy Commander		Term			Ref
No.	Portrait	Name	Took office	Left office	Duration	Ref
Space Warfare Center
–	Larry J. Chodzko	Colonel; Larry J. Chodzko	May 2005	July 2005	~75 days	
Space Training and Readiness Command
1	Todd R. Moore	Brigadier General; Todd R. Moore (born c. 1974)	23 August 2021	30 May 2024	2 years, 281 days	
2	Matthew Cantore	Brigadier General; Matthew Cantore (born 1976)	30 May 2024	29 June 2026	2 years, 30 days	-
2	Jason Schramm	Brigadier General; Jason Schramm (born 1976)	29 June 2026	Incumbent	112 days	-

== List of senior enlisted leaders ==
No.	Senior Enlisted Leader		Term			Ref
No.	Portrait	Name	Took office	Left office	Duration	Ref
1	James P. Seballes	Chief Master Sergeant; James P. Seballes (born c. 1982)	23 August 2021	19 January 2024	2 years, 149 days	
2	Karmann-Monique Pogue	Chief Master Sergeant; Karmann-Monique Pogue (born c. 1981)	19 January 2024	3 August 2026	2 years, 196 days	
3	Jason D. Childers	Chief Master Sergeant; Jason D. Childers (born c. 1985)	3 August 2026	Incumbent	77 days	

== See also ==
- Space Training and Readiness Command
- Leadership of Space Operations Command
- Leadership of Space Systems Command
