= Space Rapid Capabilities Office =

US Space Force function

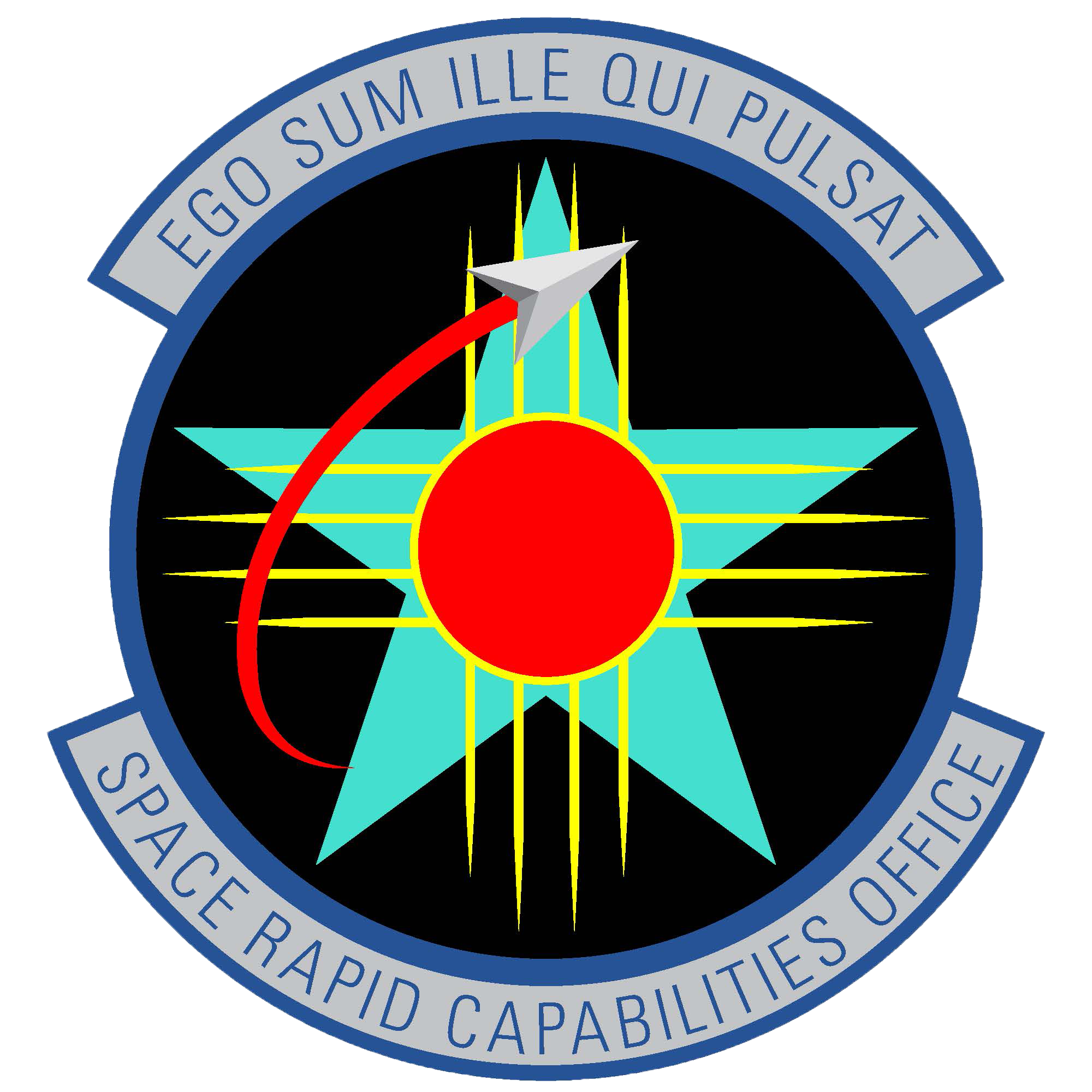
- SpRCO insignia

Office overview
- Formed: December 14, 2018
- Headquarters: Kirtland Air Force Base, New Mexico
- Motto: Ego sum ille qui pulsat "I am the one who knocks"
- Office executives: Kelly D. Hammett, Director; Robert D. Eidsmoe, Deputy Director
- Parent department: United States Space Force
- Website: kirtland.af.mil/Units/Space-Rapid-Capabilities-Office/

The Space Rapid Capabilities Office (Space RCO or SpRCO) is a Direct Reporting Unit of the United States Space Force which specializes in the expedited development and rapid production and deployment of space capabilities to fulfill short-term critical needs. The relatively small and unique office's work is directed by requirements for capabilities provided by the Commander of United States Space Command, and aims to provide capabilities responsive to a request within 1 to 3 years.

== Description ==
Established in the National Defense Authorization Act for Fiscal Year 2018, Space Rapid Capabilities Office (Space RCO) is one of the United States Space Force (USSF)'s three military acquisitions organizations; Space Development Agency and the much larger Space Systems Command are the others. It is intended to help procure urgent space-related projects, similar to Air Force Rapid Capabilities Office; Space RCO can issue contracts of up to $1 billion without outside authorization. Its main customer is United States Space Command.

Space RCO is among USSF's "most secretive agencies", according to SpaceNews, because it rarely discusses activities. Kelly Hammett, agency directory, stated in February 2023 that it decided to disclose developing three of the payloads on USSF-67 as part of a gradual reduction in secrecy, to better work with the space industry and rest of government.

== Operations ==
=== Requests for capabilities ===
Requirements can originate from across the acquisition and warfighting enterprise, driven by combatant commanders and U.S. national security space enterprise demands in order to fulfill joint military operational needs, but by law must be validated by the Commander of United States Space Command prior to Space RCO taking action.

=== Development priorities ===
==== Speed ====
Shorter timelines for deliverable space capabilities is the core of the Space RCO. In order to accomplish this, the office is allowed four significant departures in methodology from traditional Department of Defense procedure to accelerate the process of space acquisitions: It has a short and narrow chain of command; early and consistent end user involvement; small, cohesively integrated and empowered program teams; and a cadre of preassembled support across human resources, contracting, finance, IT, and security. The office explained on its Facebook page, "speed of warfighting relevance isn't just a tagline, its the reason we exist." As a result, Space RCO projects have maintained an average 50% shorter timeframe from request for proposal to funding award than traditional contracting methods within the Department of Defense. The office has issued more than 40 contracts in the two years since it has begun issuing.

==== Outreach ====
The Space RCO conducts outreach to small and midsize businesses to broaden its visibility and enhance its network of potential partners to harness commercial solutions to accelerate research and development periods. It participated in the creation of SpaceWERX, the Space Force offshoot of the Air Force's AFWERX start-up accelerator built on the financing model of Air Force Special Operations Command which can provide immediate on the spot cash payments to eligible projects from start-ups who pitch their ideas at pitch days and develop them in idea incubators. It also allows initial rounds of funding to be used to generate credibility for startups to find other commercial backing to grow and build their ideas, and gives the government a route to procure resulting technology in the future. The programs have also established multiple permanent incubator facilities at the University of Nevada, Las Vegas, and in Austin, Texas, and Washington, D.C.

The office has partnered with the Los Alamos National Laboratory to advance the Lab Embedded Entrepreneur Program (LEEP), which provides innovators up to $400K in funding, access to the lab's expertise, and training to rapidly advance technology, collaborating with the lab on Space Systems thrust.

== Organization ==
Space RCO was designated a Direct Reporting Unit October 21, 2020, reporting directly to the Chief of Space Operations.

=== Personnel ===
The office is led by a civilian director and deputy director, but employs a mix of Department of Defense civilians, and active duty members of the Space Force and Air Force.

=== Locations ===
Space RCO is headquartered at Kirtland Air Force Base in Albuquerque, New Mexico, but has additional staff located in Washington, D.C., and Colorado Springs, Colorado.

== Board of directors ==
- Secretary of the Air Force, Chair
- Chief of Staff of the Air Force
- Chief of Space Operations
- Commander of US Space Command
- Undersecretary of Defense for Acquisition and Sustainment
- Undersecretary of Defense for Research and Engineering
- Assistant Secretary of the Air Force for Acquisition, Technology and Logistics

This board will presumably include the space force acquisition executive mandated by Congress in the NDAA FY2020.

== List of directors ==
No.	Director		Term		
No.	Portrait	Name	Took office	Left office	Term length
–	Shahnaz M. Punjani	Colonel; Shahnaz M. Punjani; Acting	December 12, 2017	July 2018	215 days
–	Timothy Sejba	Colonel; Timothy Sejba; Acting	July 2018	February 2019	215 days
1	Michael W. Roberts	Michael W. Roberts	February 2019	May 28, 2022	3 years, 102 days
2	Kelly D. Hammett	Kelly D. Hammett	June 8, 2022	Incumbent	4 years, 167 days
