= Todd R. Moore =

U.S. Space Force general

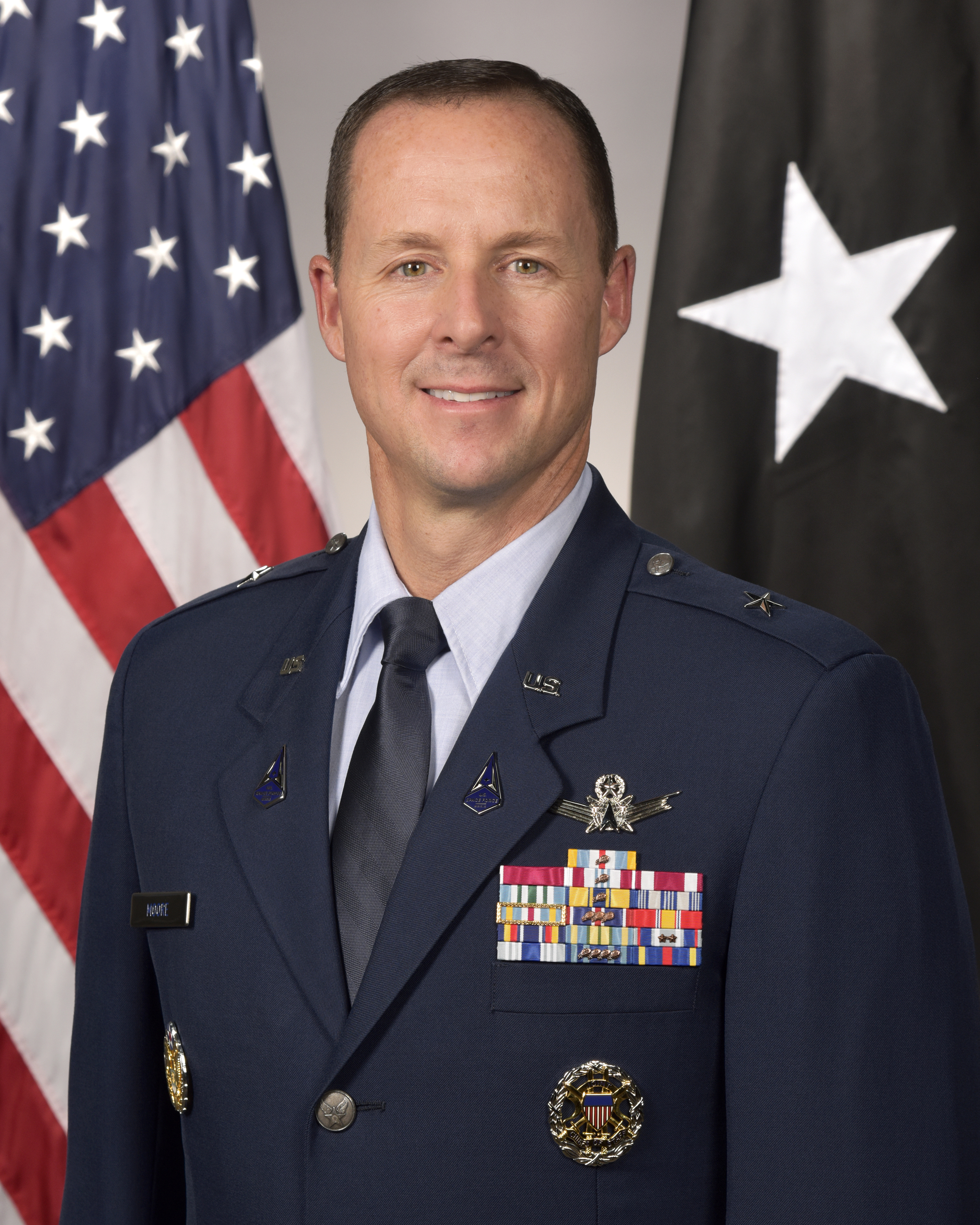
- Official portrait, 2021
- Born: c. 1974 (age 51–52); Philadelphia, Pennsylvania, U.S.
- Alma mater: University of Delaware (BS): University of Colorado–Colorado Springs (MBA)
- Spouse: Kelly Zachocki (m. 1999)
- Military career
- Allegiance: United States
- Branch: United States Air Force: United States Space Force
- Service years: 1996–2020 (Air Force): 2020–2024 (Space Force)
- Rank: Brigadier General
- Commands: 21st Space Wing: Air Force Element, RAF Menwith Hill; Space Operations Squadron
- Awards: Defense Superior Service Medal (2): Legion of Merit

Todd R. Moore (born c. 1974) is a retired United States Space Force brigadier general who served as the first deputy commander of Space Training and Readiness Command. He previously served as inspector general of Space Operations Command.

Moore is from Philadelphia, Pennsylvania. He entered the United States Air Force after graduating from the University of Delaware. A career space operations officer, he has served as an Air Force instructor, completed three staff assignments at the Pentagon, and worked for the National Reconnaissance Office. He has commanded the Space Operations Squadron at Aerospace Data Facility-Colorado, Air Force Element at RAF Menwith Hill, and the 21st Space Wing. He also served as the deputy director of the Space Security and Defense Program, where he was responsible for jointly focusing the Department of Defense and the Intelligence Community's space survivability and protection efforts.

In 2020, Moore transferred to the Space Force. He was promoted among the first officers to be promoted to brigadier general in the new service. Since 2021, he has served as the first deputy commander of Space Training and Readiness Command. He is retiring in 2024.

== Early life and education ==
Moore was born and raised in Philadelphia, Pennsylvania. He graduated from Lower Merion High School. In 1995, he received a B.S. degree in business administration in finance and management from the University of Delaware. He then received an MBA from the University of Colorado Colorado Springs and an M.A. degree in national security and strategic studies from the Naval War College.

== Military career ==
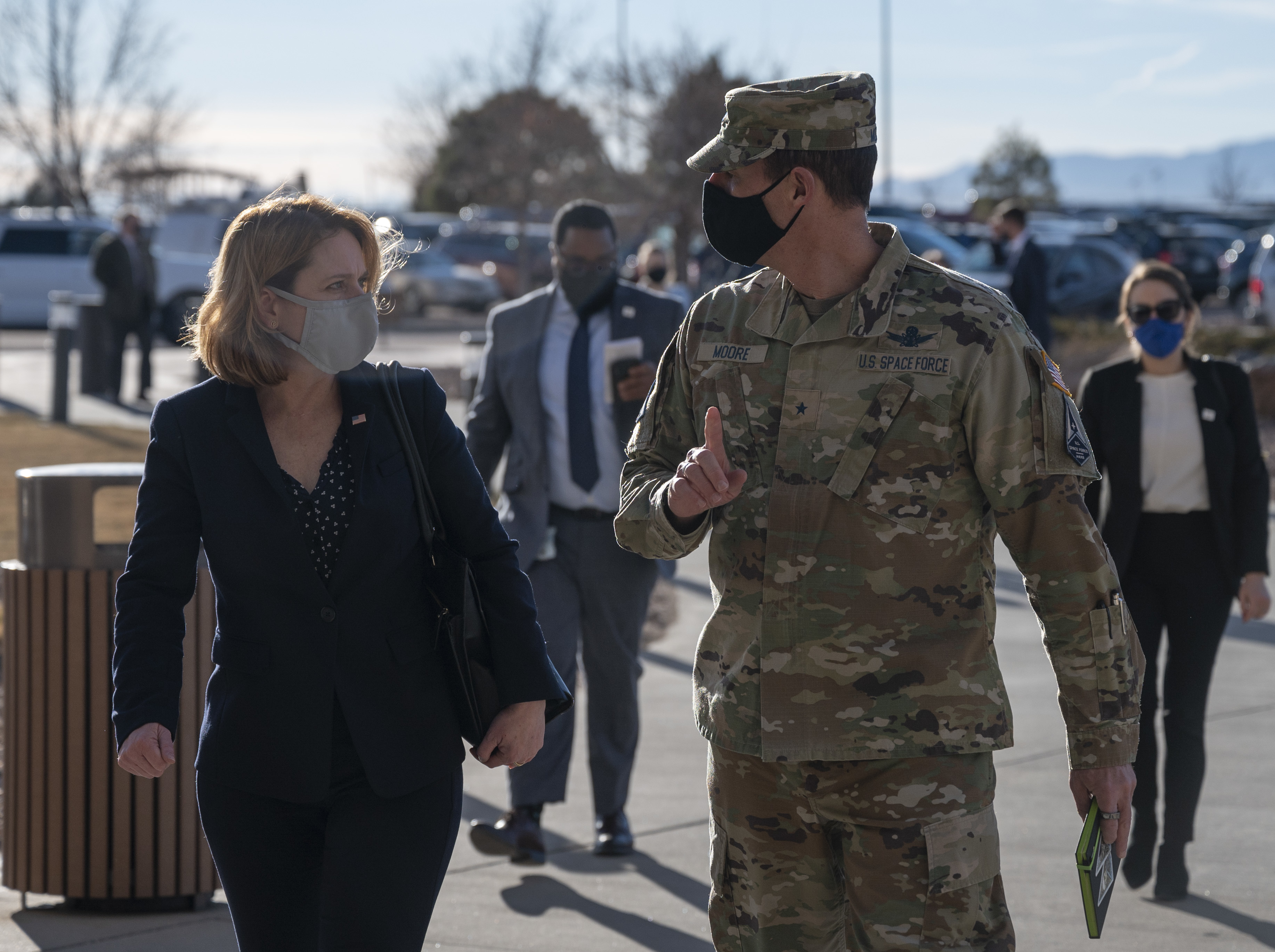
Moore touring Deputy Secretary Hicks at Schriever Air Force Base, 2021

On January 6, 1996, Moore was commissioned into the United States Air Force as a second lieutenant. He then underwent a nine-month undergraduate space and missile training at Vandenberg Air Force Base, California.

In 1997, he was sent to his first operational assignment with the 4th Space Operations Squadron at Schriever Air Force Base, Colorado, as a satellite operator and operations engineer. From 1999 to 2023, he went back to Vandenberg to serve as an instructor and deputy flight commander with the 534th Training Squadron.

From 2003 to 2005, Moore served as an Air Force intern at the Pentagon. For two years after that, he served as flight commander and assistant director of operations at an undisclosed location. After, that he was assigned as the executive officer to the deputy director of the National Reconnaissance Office at Chantilly, Virginia. From 2008 to 2010, he was stationed at Schriever as operations officer of the 3rd Space Experimentation Squadron.

In June 2010, he took command of the Space Operations Squadron at Aerospace Data Facility-Colorado, Buckley Air Force Base, Colorado. He relinquished command of the squadron two years later before going to the National War College for a year.

Moore was stationed at the Pentagon from 2013 to 2015. First, he served as chief of the Space Branch at the Joint Staff’s Directorate of Command, Control, Communications and Computers and Cyber (J6). Afterwards, he served as the deputy director of the Joint Staff Mitigation Oversight Task Force for a year.

From 2015 to 2017, Moore was stationed in England, serving as commander of the Air Force Element at RAF Menwith Hill. After that, he went back to the United States to serve as commander of the 21st Space Wing for two years. For a year after that, he served as the deputy director of the Space Security and Defense Program.

From 2020 to 2021, Moore served as the inspector general of Space Operations Command. While in this position, he transferred into the United States Space Force. In August 2021, he became the first deputy commander of Space Training and Readiness Command. A month later, he was promoted to brigadier general.

In September 2023, Moore sent a letter to a selection board, signifying his intent not to be considered for promotion to major general. He then submitted his resignation letter to General B. Chance Saltzman in November, who accepted his resignation. He is retiring from active duty on September 1, 2024.

== Personal life ==
In June 1999, Moore married Kelly Zachocki.

== Awards and decorations ==
Moore is the recipient of the following awards:

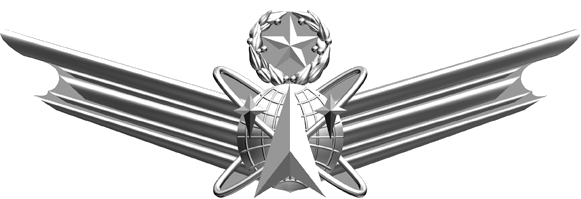
Command Space Operations Badge

Office of the Joint Chiefs of Staff Identification Badge

Air Staff Badge

Defense Superior Service Medal with one bronze oak leaf cluster
Legion of Merit with one bronze oak leaf cluster
Defense Meritorious Service Medal with two bronze oak leaf clusters
Meritorious Service Medal
Joint Service Commendation Medal
Joint Service Commendation Medal with one bronze oak leaf cluster
Air Force Achievement Medal
Joint Meritorious Unit Award
Air Force Outstanding Unit Award with three bronze oak leaf clusters
National Defense Service Medal
Global War on Terrorism Service Medal
Outstanding Volunteer Service Medal
Air and Space Campaign Medal with two bronze service stars
Air Force Overseas Long Tour Service Ribbon
Air Force Longevity Service Award with four bronze oak leaf clusters
Air Force Training Ribbon

== Dates of promotion ==
Rank	Branch	Date
Second Lieutenant	Air Force	January 6, 1996
First Lieutenant	Air Force	January 14, 1998
Captain	Air Force	January 14, 2000
Major	Air Force	March 1, 2006
Lieutenant Colonel	Air Force	March 1, 2010
Colonel	Air Force	October 1, 2014
Colonel	Space Force	~September 30, 2020
Brigadier General	Space Force	September 2, 2021

Military offices
Preceded by ???	Commander of the Space Operations Squadron; 2012–2014	Succeeded by Jacob Middleton Jr.
Preceded by Christopher Povak	Commander of the Air Force Element at RAF Menwith Hill; 2015–2017	Succeeded by James E. Smith
Preceded by Douglas A. Schiess	Commander of the 21st Space Wing; 2017–2019	Succeeded by Thomas G. Falzarano
Preceded by Anthony Mastalir	Deputy Director of the Space Security and Defense Program; 2019–2020	Succeeded by ???
Preceded by Sussannah B. Myers	Inspector General of Space Operations Command; 2020–2021	Succeeded by Richard L. Bourquin
New command	Deputy Commander of Space Training and Readiness Command; 2021–2024	Succeeded by Matthew Cantore
