= Shawn Bratton =

U.S. Space Force general officer

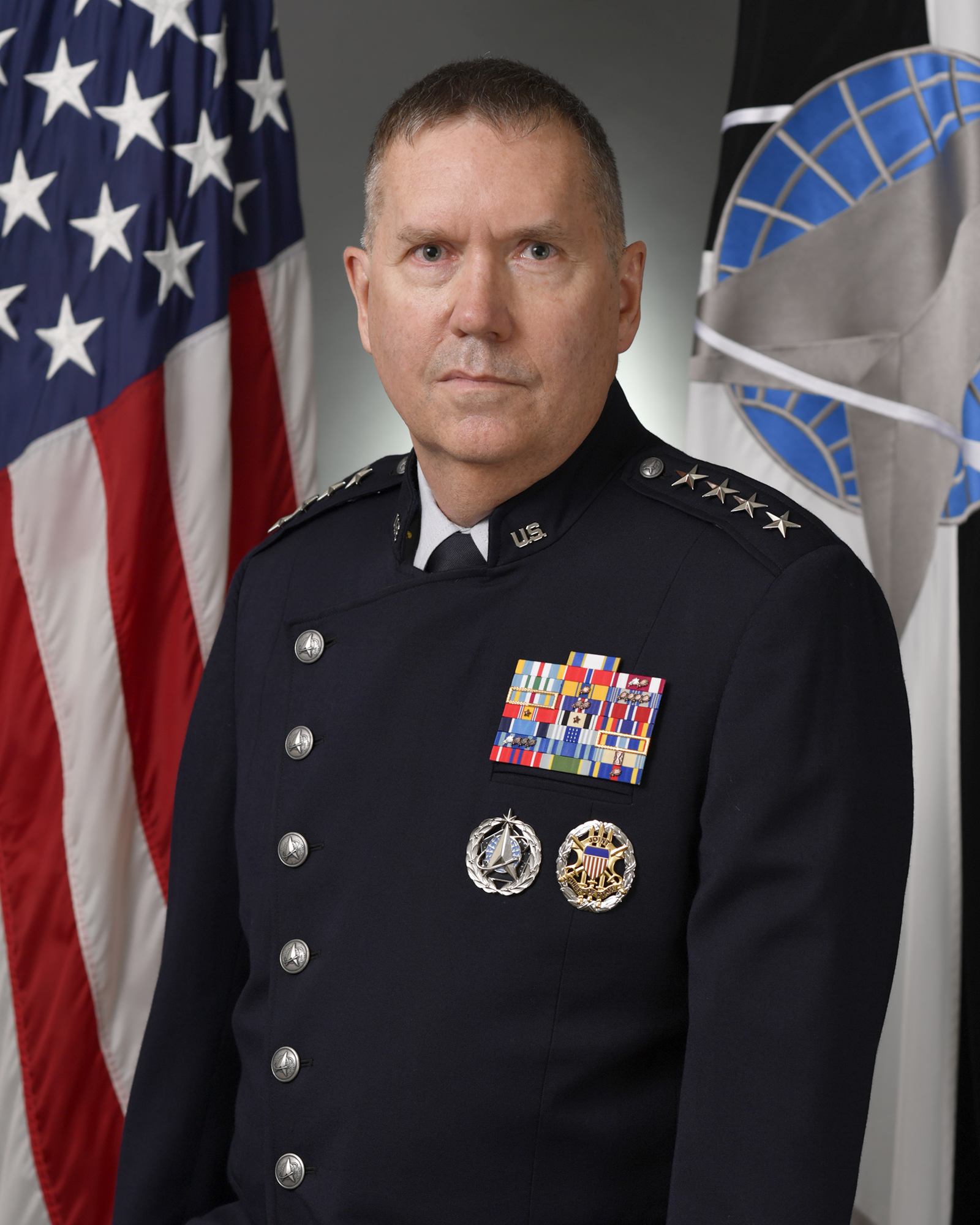
- Official portrait, 2025
- Born: August 21, 1968 (age 58); Texas, U.S.
- Education: Arizona State University (BA): Naval War College (MS)
- Military career
- Allegiance: United States
- Branch: United States Air Force (1987–2023): United States Space Force (2023–present)
- Rank: General
- Commands: Vice Chief of Space Operations; Space Training and Readiness Command; 175th Cyberspace Operations Group
- Conflicts: Iraq War
- Awards: Air Force Distinguished Service Medal; Defense Superior Service Medal; Bronze Star Medal

Shawn Nicholas Bratton (born August 21, 1968) is a United States Space Force general who serves as the third vice chief of space operations. He previously served as the first commander of Space Training and Readiness Command and deputy chief of space operations for strategy, plans, programs, and requirements. He is the first Space Force general officer to come from the Air National Guard.

Bratton enlisted in the Arizona Air National Guard in 1987, where he worked in aircraft control and early warning systems. In 1994, he was commissioned as a second lieutenant after graduating from the Academy of Military Science. He is a career space and cyber operations officer who commanded the 175th Cyberspace Operations Group. He also deployed to Iraq during the Iraq War.

Bratton led the creation of the Space Training and Readiness Command, becoming its first commander in 2021. In 2023, he transferred into the Space Force. In 2024, he was promoted to lieutenant general and became the Space Force's chief strategy and resourcing officer.

== Education ==
- 1993 Bachelor of Arts in Secondary Education, Arizona State University, Tempe, Arizona
- 1994 Academy of Military Science, Knoxville, Tennessee
- 1999 Squadron Officer School, Maxwell AFB, Alabama
- 2005 Air Command and Staff College (ACSC), by correspondence
- 2010 Air War College, by correspondence
- 2011 United States Naval War College, in residence
- 2011 Master of Science in National Security Studies, United States Naval War College, Newport, Rhode Island
- 2020 Enterprise Leadership Seminar (ELS), University of North Carolina, Chapel Hill, NC
- 2020 Leading Strategically, CCL Campus, Colorado Springs, CO
- 2021 Senior Leader Orientation Course (SLOC), Arlington, VA

== Military career ==
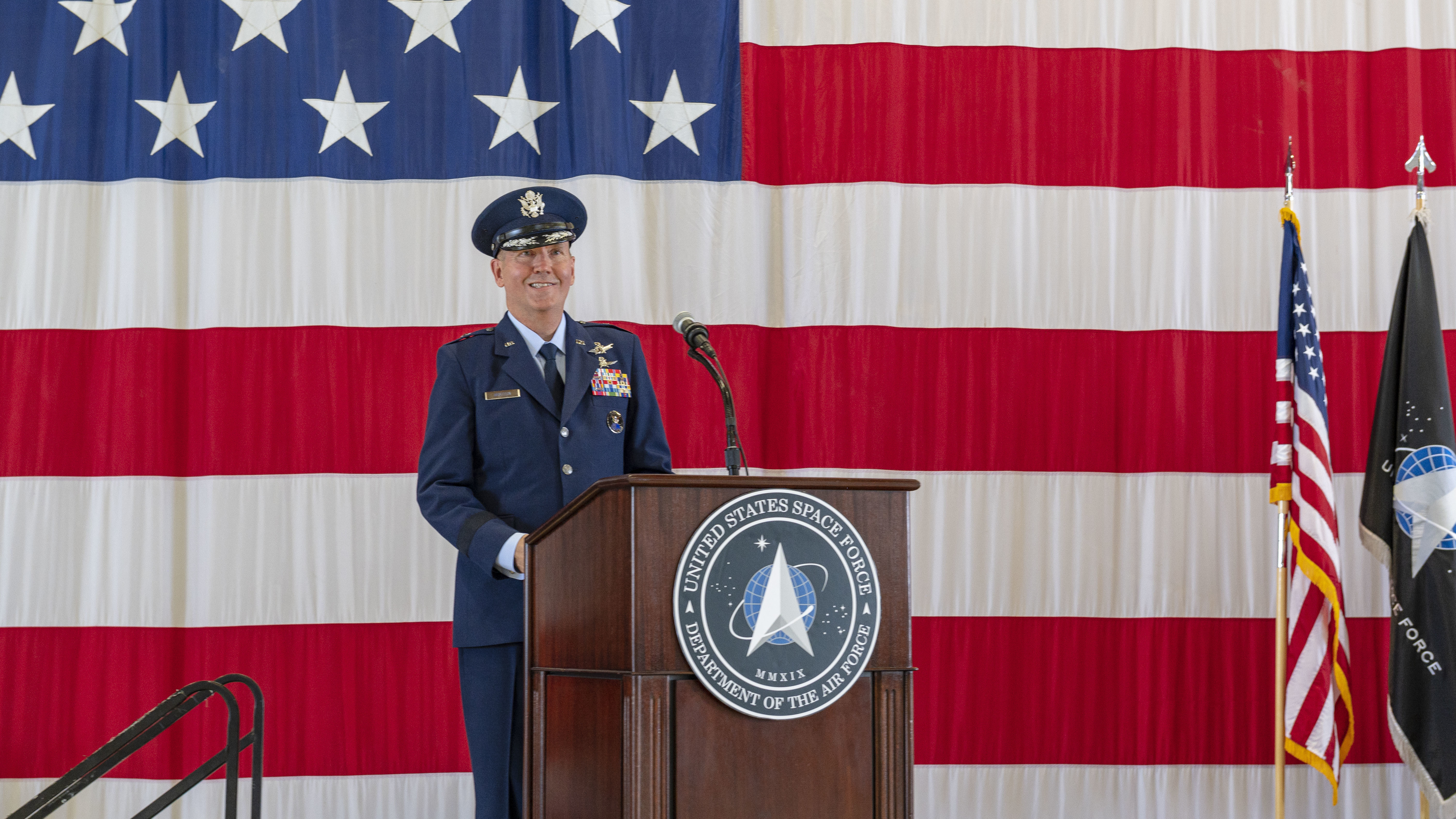
Bratton speaks during the Space Training and Readiness Command activation ceremony, 23 August 2021

In July 2023, Bratton was nominated for transfer to the Space Force and promotion to lieutenant general and assignment as deputy chief of space operations for strategy, plans, programs, and requirements. Following his confirmation on 5 December 2023, he transferred to the Space Force as a major general, becoming the first Space Force general officer to have come from the Air National Guard. On 22 December 2023, he was promoted to lieutenant general and became the Space Forces’s chief strategy and resourcing officer. In July 2025, he was nominated for promotion to general and assignment as the vice chief of space operations.

=== Assignments ===
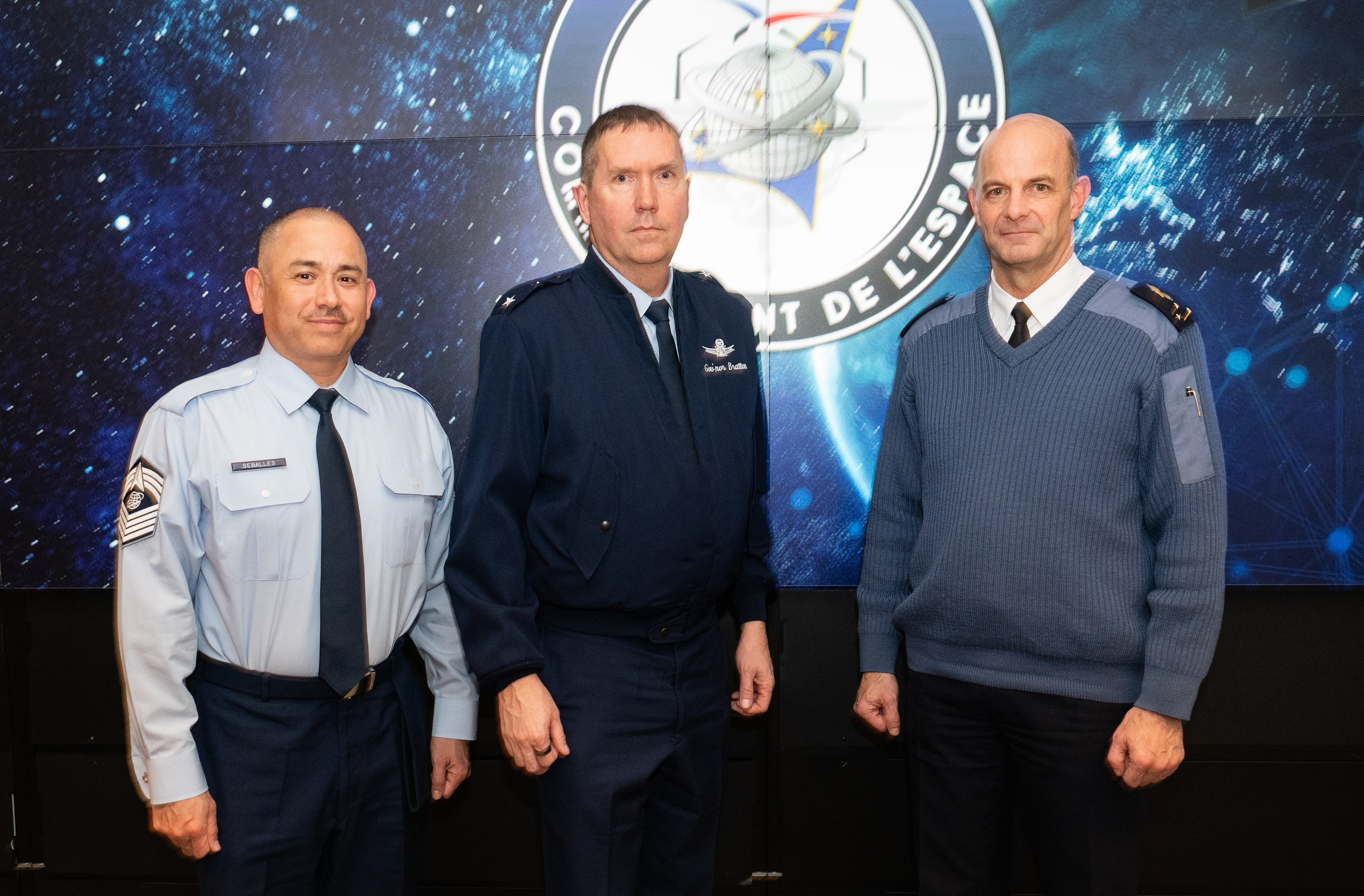
Bratton (center) with CMSgt James Seballes (left), STARCOM senior enlisted leader, and French Maj. Gen. Philippe Adam, commander of French Space Command, 2023

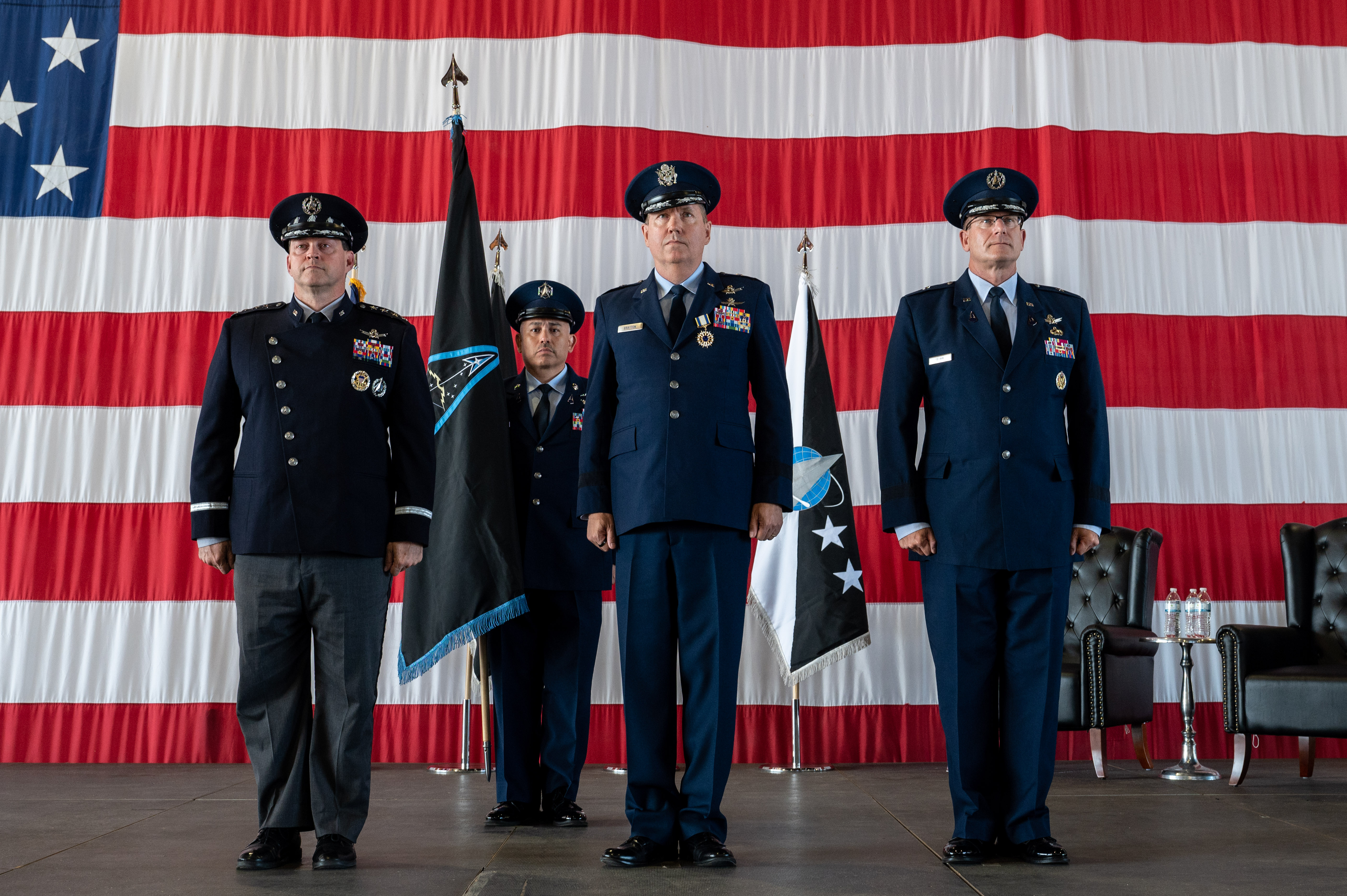
Bratton (center) stands at attention with Gen B. Chance Saltzman (left) and Brig Gen Timothy Sejba during the STARCOM change of command ceremony, 20 July 2023

1. April 1987 - December 1987, Student, Aircraft Control and Early Warning Systems, Keesler AFB, Miss.
2. January 1988 - September 1994, Aircraft Control and Warning Radar Technician, 107th Air Control Squadron, Arizona Air National Guard, Phoenix, Ariz.
3. September 1994 - October 1994, Student, Academy of Military Science, Knoxville, Tenn.
4. October 1994 - August 1999, Communications Officer, 107th Air Control Squadron, Phoenix, Ariz.
5. August 1999 - March 2000, Operations Officer, Joint Counter-Narcotics Task Force, Phoenix, Ariz.
6. March 2000 - December 2003, Action Officer, HQ AFSPC/CG, Peterson AFB, Colo.
7. January 2003 - June 2003, Student, USAF Weapons School, Nellis AFB, Nev.
8. July 2003 - July 2005, Weapons and Tactics, HQ AFSPC/A3, Peterson AFB, Colo.
9. August 2005 - July 2007, Weapons Officer, Det 2, AZ ANG, Sky Harbor IAP, Phoenix, Ariz.
10. August 2007 - July 2010, ANG Advisor to 14th Air Force, Vandenberg AFB, Calif
11. August 2010 - June 2011, Student, Naval War College, Newport, R.I.
12. June 2011 - February 2014, ANG Advisor to AFSPC/A3 & A6, Peterson AFB, Colo.
13. March 2014 - May 2015, ANG Advisor to the Commander, AFSPC, Peterson AFB, Colo.
14. May 2015 - June 2017, Cyber Ops Group Commander, 175th Wing, Warfield ANG Base, Md.
15. July 2017 - January 2018, ANG Advisor to the Commander, AFSPC, Peterson AFB, Colo.
16. April 2019 - August 2019, Special Assistant to Chief, National Guard Bureau for Space, National Guard Bureau, Peterson AFB, CO
17. August 2019 - January 2021, Deputy Director, J3, USSPACECOM, CO
18. February 2021 - August 2021, Space Training and Readiness Command Planning Lead, Peterson AFB, Colo.
19. February 2021 – July 2023, Commander, Space Training and Readiness Command, Peterson Space Force Base, Colorado
20. July 2023 – December 2023, Special Assistant to the Chief of Space Operations
21. December 2023 – August 2025, Deputy Chief of Space Operations for Strategy, Plans, Programs, and Requirements, United States Space Force, the Pentagon, Arlington Va.
22. August 2025 – present, Vice Chief of Space Operations, United States Space Force, the Pentagon, Arlington Va.

== Awards and decorations ==
Bratton is the recipient of the following awards:

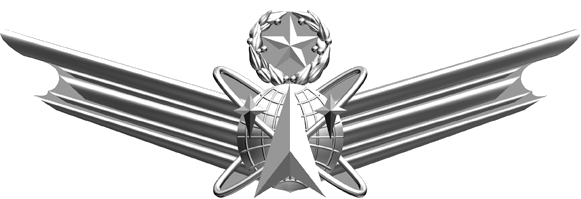
Command Space Operations Badge

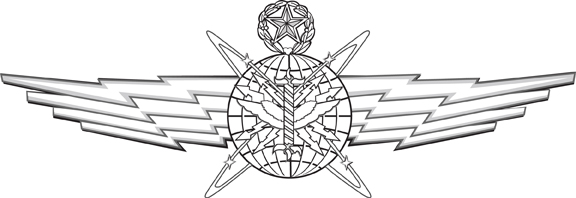

Master Cyberspace Operator Badge

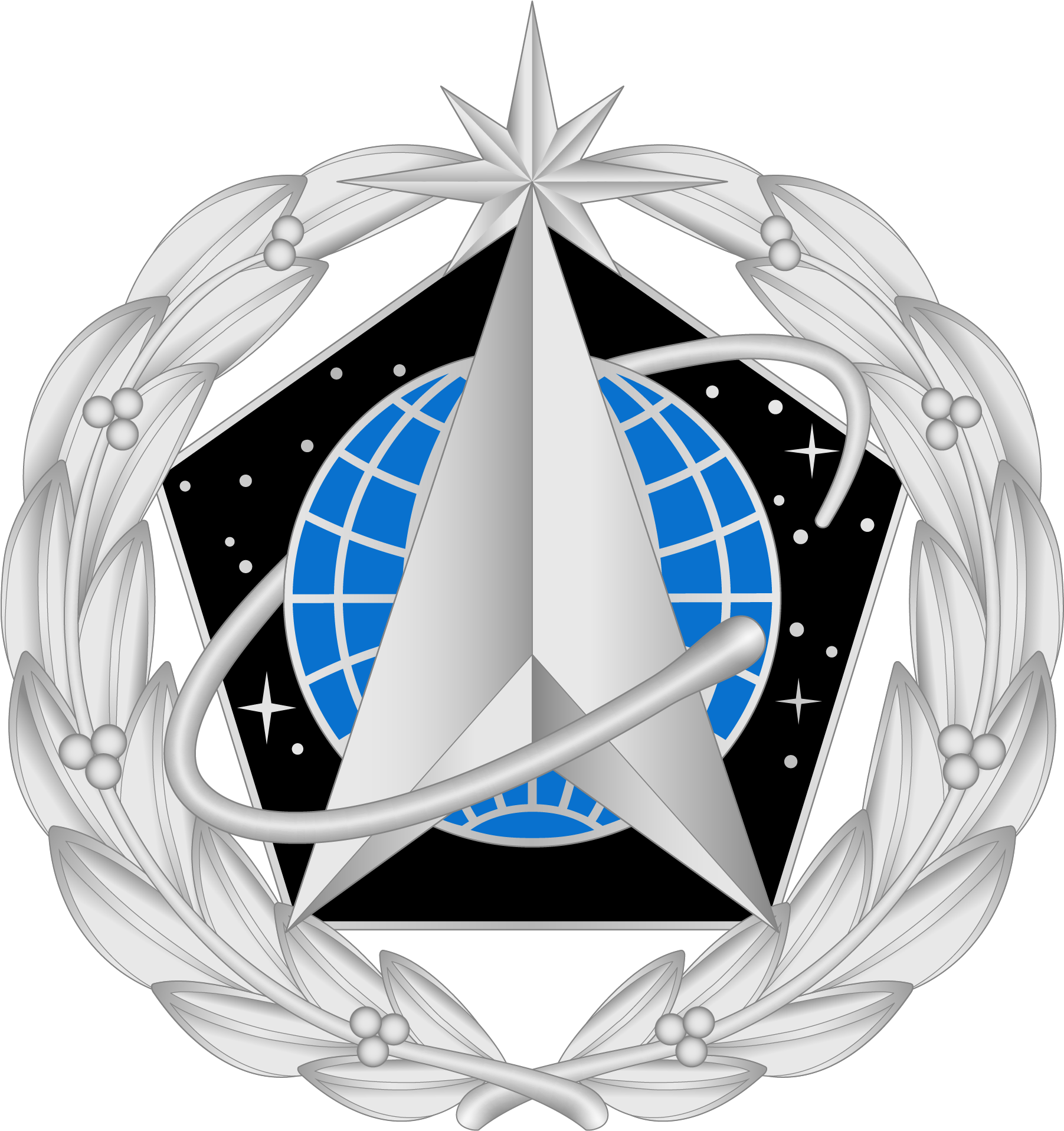

Space Staff Badge

Air Force Distinguished Service Medal
Defense Superior Service Medal
Bronze Star Medal
Meritorious Service Medal with one silver and one bronze oak leaf clusters
Joint Service Commendation Medal
Air Force Commendation Medal with one bronze oak leaf cluster
Air Force Achievement Medal with four bronze oak leaf clusters
Joint Meritorious Unit Award
Air Force Outstanding Unit Award with two bronze oak leaf clusters
Air Force Organizational Excellence Award
National Defense Service Medal with one bronze service star
Iraq Campaign Medal with one bronze service star
Global War on Terrorism Service Medal
Air Force Overseas Short Tour Service Ribbon
Air Force Expeditionary Service Ribbon with gold frame
Air Force Longevity Service Award with one silver and three bronze oak leaf clusters
Air Force Longevity Service Award (second ribbon to denote tenth award)
Armed Forces Reserve Medal with one silver Hourglass device
NCO Professional Military Education Graduate Ribbon
Air Force Small Arms Expert Marksmanship Ribbon
Air Force Training Ribbon with one bronze oak leaf cluster

== Dates of promotion ==
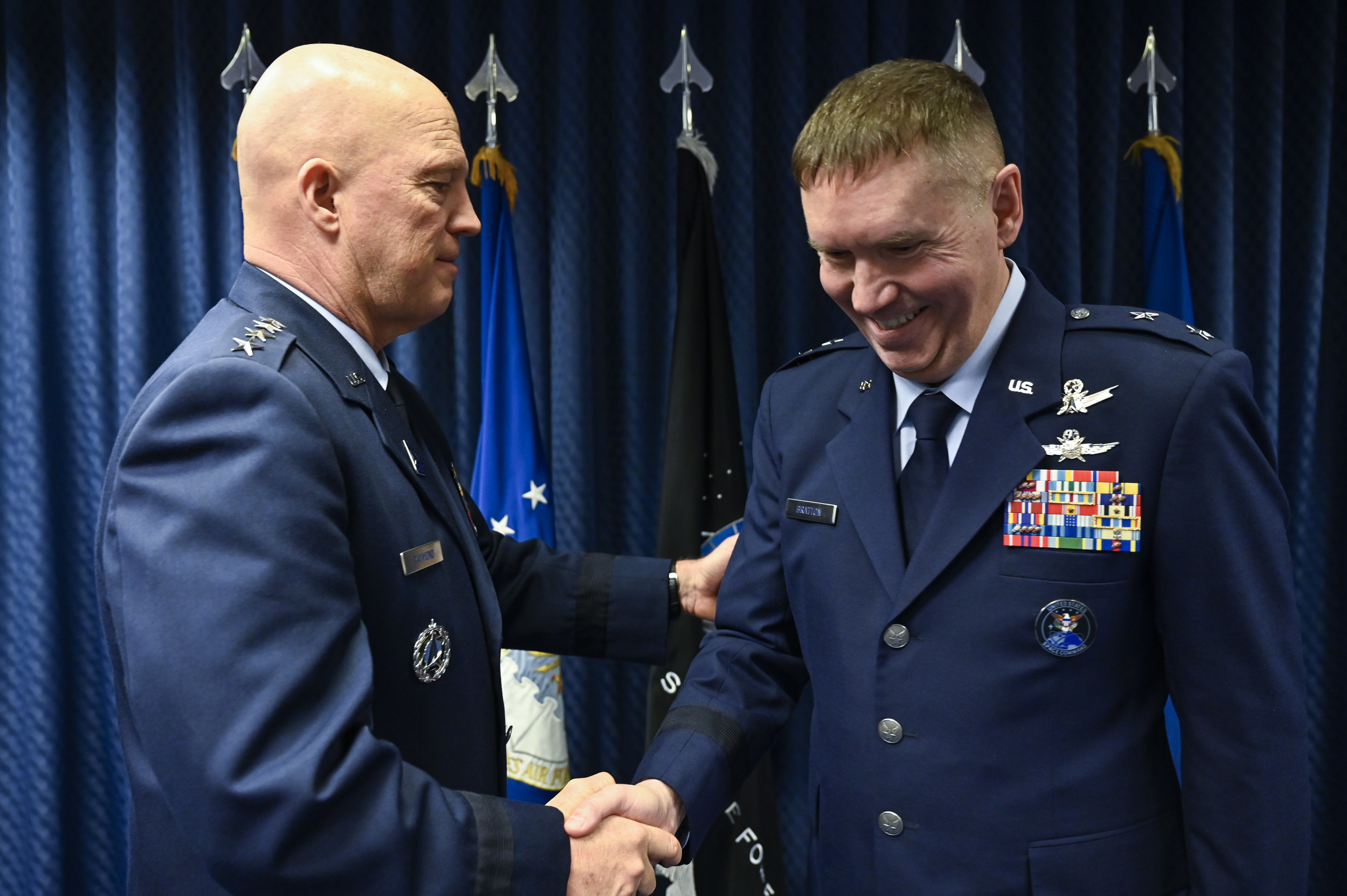
Gen Raymond shakes Bratton's hand after his promotion to major general, 16 March 2022

Rank	Branch	Date
Second lieutenant	Air Force	29 September 1994
First lieutenant	Air Force	30 September 1996
Captain	Air Force	3 October 1998
Major	Air Force	17 October 2002
Lieutenant colonel	Air Force	1 August 2007
Colonel	Air Force	26 May 2011
Brigadier general	Air Force	2 April 2019
Major general	Air Force	17 February 2022
Major general	Space Force	5 December 2023
Lieutenant general	Space Force	22 December 2023
General	Space Force	31 July 2025

== Writings ==
- Planning for Cyberspace: Ensuring the Integration of Cyberspace into the Joint Operations Planning Process at the Geographic Combatant Command (PDF) (M.S.). Naval War College. 2010.

Military offices
Preceded by ???	Air National Guard Assistant to the Commander of the Air Force Space Command; 2017–2018	Succeeded by Edward A. Sauley III
Preceded by ???	Special Assistant for Space to the Chief of the National Guard Bureau; 2019	Succeeded by Patrick Cobb
New office	Deputy Director of Operations of the United States Space Command; 2019–2021	Succeeded by Richard Zellman
New office	Commander of Space Training and Readiness Command; 2021–2023	Succeeded by Timothy Sejba
Preceded by Philip Garrant	Deputy Chief of Space Operations for Strategy, Plans, Programs, and Requirements; 2023–2025	Succeeded by David N. Miller
Preceded by Michael Guetlein	Vice Chief of Space Operations; 2025–present	Incumbent
