= Michael W. Roberts =

American defense official

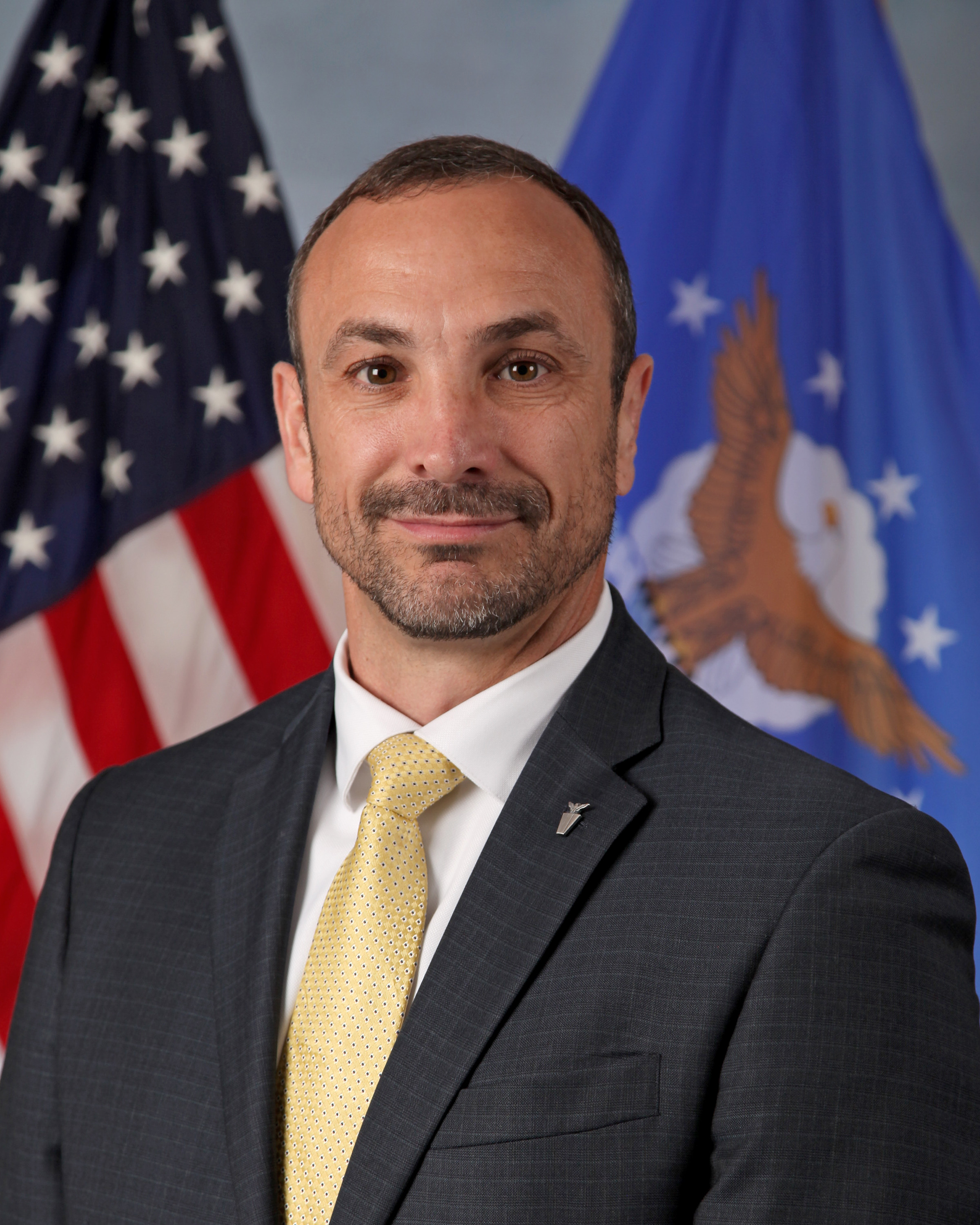
- Official portrait, 2019

Director of the Space Rapid Capabilities Office
- In office February 2019 – May 2022
- Preceded by: Timothy Sejba (acting)
- Succeeded by: Kelly D. Hammett

Personal details
- Education: Grantham University (BS); University of Management and Technology (MS); Naval Postgraduate School (MS)

Michael W. Roberts is an American defense acquisition official who served as the first director of the Space Rapid Capabilities Office. He also served as the Executive Director for the Navy’s Project Overmatch. A prior member of the Senior Executive Service, he has worked for the Department of the Navy (United States Navy), Department of the Air Force (United States Space Force), Northrop Grumman, and currently works for Lockheed Martin Space.
