= Matthew Cantore =

U.S. Space Force officer

- Official portrait, 2026
- Born: July 18, 1976 (age 50); Guilderland, New York, U.S.
- Education: United States Air Force Academy (BS); Troy University (MS)
- Spouse: Laura Cantore (m. 2002)
- Military career
- Allegiance: United States
- Branch: United States Air Force: United States Space Force
- Service years: 1998–2020 (Air Force): 2020–present (Space Force)
- Rank: Major General
- Nickname: Beaker
- Commands: Space Delta 2; 3rd Space Experimentation Squadron
- Awards: Legion of Merit (2)

Matthew Scott Cantore (born July 18, 1976) is a United States Space Force brigadier general who served as the first commander of Space Delta 2 from 2019 to 2021. He now serves as the deputy commander of Space Training and Readiness Command.

Cantore was commissioned into the United States Air Force in 1998 through the United States Air Force Academy. He initially worked in ICBM assignments before getting working space operations. He has commanded the 3rd Space Experimentation Squadron and 21st Operations Group.

In 2020, the 21st Operations Group was redesignated as Space Delta 2 as part of organizational changes after the establishment of the Space Force. As such, he became the first commander of Space Delta 2. In 2020, he transferred to the Space Force. In 2024, promoted to brigadier general.

== Early life and education ==
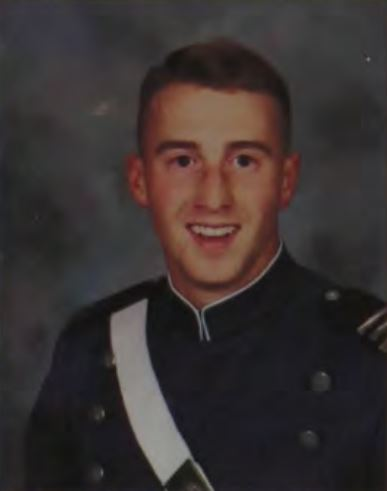
Cadet Cantore in 1995

Cantore was born and raised in Guilderland, New York. His mother and father worked for the state of New York. As early as high school, he wanted to have a career related to space.

- 1994 Guilderland High School, Guilderland, New York
- 1998 Bachelor of Science, Space Operations, United States Air Force Academy, Colorado Springs, Colo.
- 1999 Undergraduate Space and Missile Training and BMEWS Initial Qualification Training, Vandenberg Air Force Base, Calif.
- 2000 Minuteman III Initial Qualification Training, Vandenberg AFB, Calif.
- 2003 Squadron Officer School, Maxwell AFB, Montgomery, Ala.
- 2005 Space Weapons Instructor Course, USAF Weapons School, Nellis AFB, Nev.
- 2007 Master of Science, International Relations, Troy University, Troy, Ala.
- 2010 Master of Science, Leadership and Joint Campaign Planning Joint Advanced Warfighting School, Norfolk, Va.
- 2017 Master of Arts, National Security and Strategic Studies, Naval War College, Newport, R.I.
- 2023 Enterprise Leadership Seminar, Kenan-Flager Business School, University of North Carolina, Chapel Hill, N.C.

== Military career ==
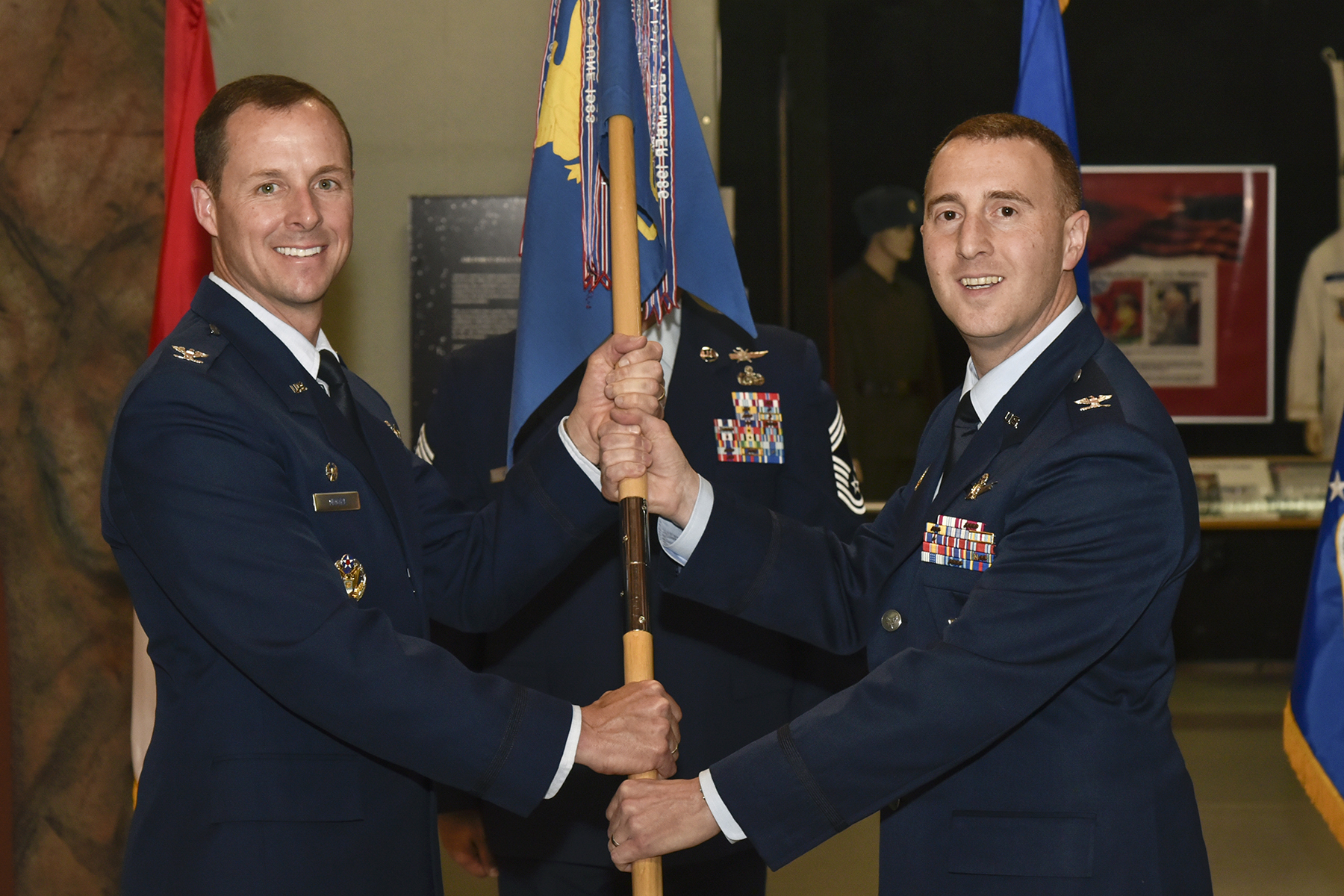
Col Moore (left) passes the 21st Operations Group guidon to Cantore (right) during a change of command ceremony in 2019

In 2024, Cantore was nominated and confirmed for promotion to brigadier general. He was promoted to brigadier general on 1 February 2024

=== Assignments ===
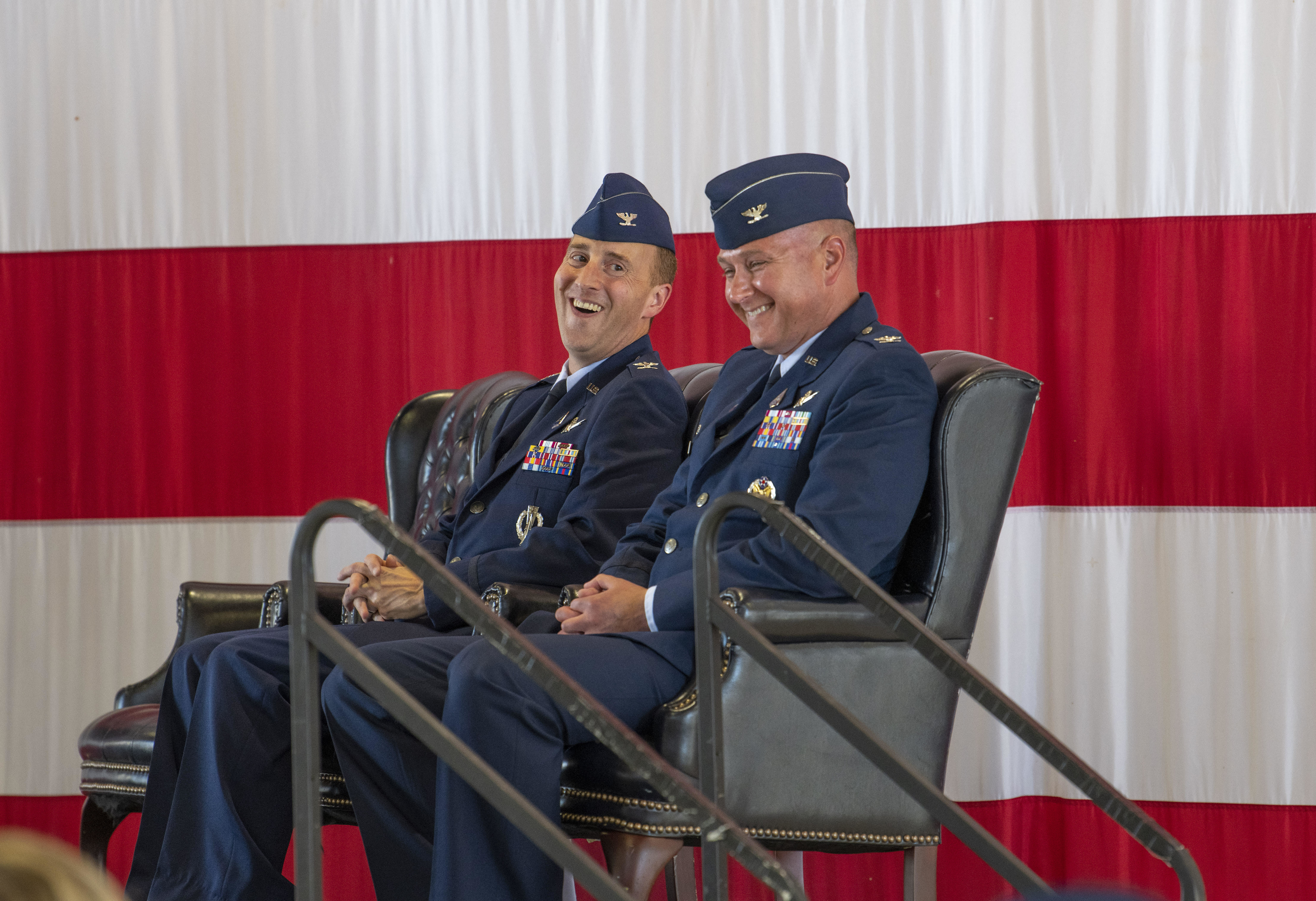
Cantore (left) relinquished command of Space Delta 2 to Col Brock (right) in June 2021

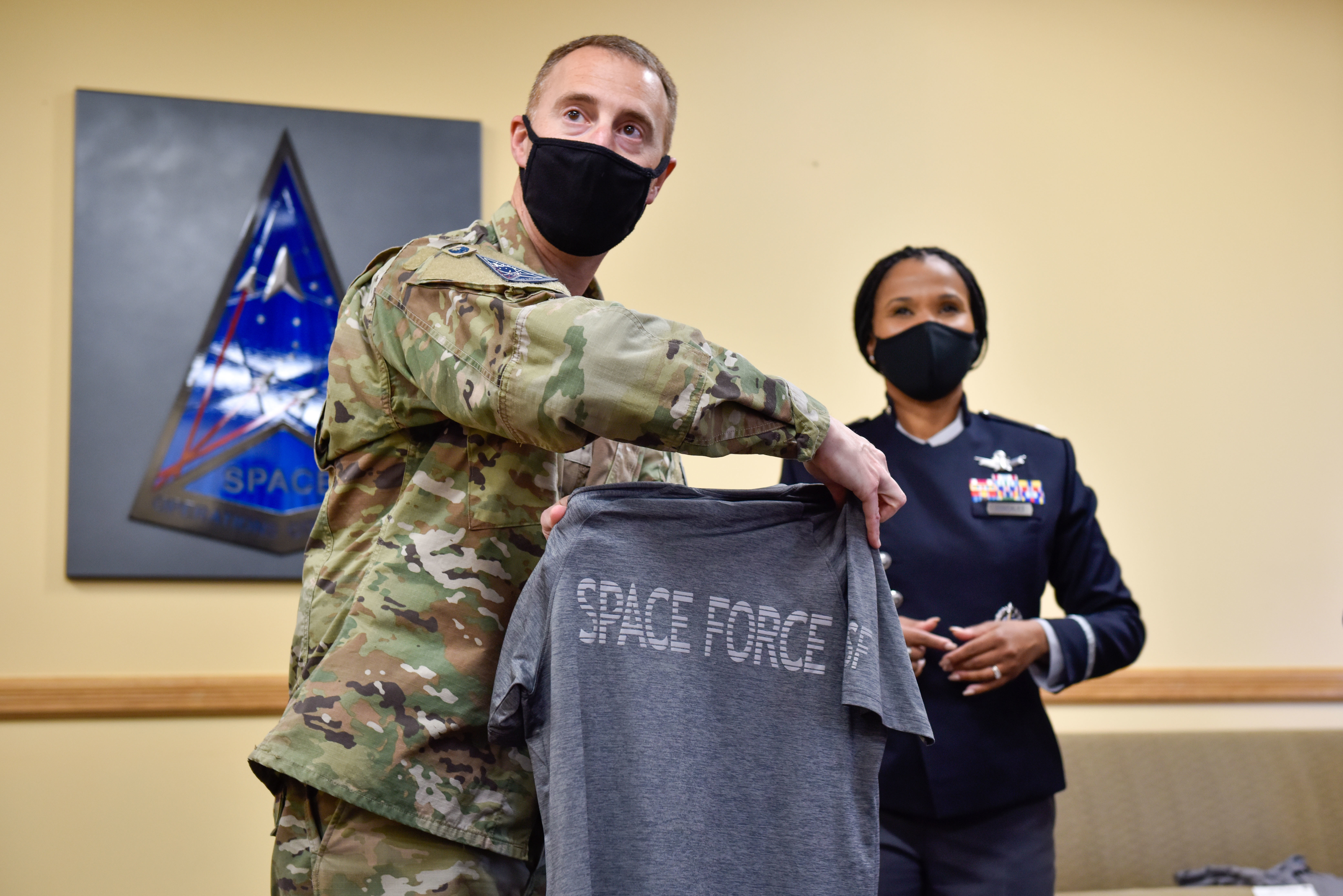
Cantore showing off the new Space Force physical training uniform prototype

1. August 1998–January 1999, Ast. Executive Officer, Directorate of Operations, 14th Air Force, Vandenberg Air Force Base, Calif.
2. January 1999–May 1999, Student, Undergraduate Space/Missile Training, 381st Training Group, Vandenberg AFB, Calif.
3. May 1999–May 2000, Crew Commander and Instructor, 13th Space Warning Squadron, Clear Air Force Station, Alaska
4. May 2000–August 2000, Student, ICBM Initial Qualification Training, 381st Training Group, Vandenberg AFB, Calif.
5. August 2000–August 2003, Flight Commander and Evaluator, 741st Missile Squadron, Minot AFB, N.D.
6. September 2003–January 2006, ICBM Test Operations Officer, 576th Flight Test Squadron, Vandenberg AFB, Calif.
7. July 2005–December 2005, Student, Space Weapons Instructor Course, USAF Weapons School, Nellis AFB, Nev.
8. February 2006–June 2009, Chief of Space Operations, Executive Officer, and Chief of Forces, 609th Air Operations Group, 9th Air Force and U.S. Air Forces Central Command, Shaw AFB, S.C.
9. January 2008–May 2008, Weapons Officer, Director of Space Forces, Air Forces Central Command, Al Udeid Air Base, Qatar
10. July 2009–July 2010, Student, Joint Advanced Warfighting School, Joint Forces Staff College, Norfolk, Va.
11. July 2010–July 2012, Chief, Ops & Plans Branch, Deputy Directorate for Global Operations, Joint Staff, Pentagon, Washington, D.C.
12. July 2012–June 2013, Deputy Chief, Combat Operations Division, Joint Space Operations Center and 614th Air Operations Center, Vandenberg AFB, Calif.
13. June 2013–February 2015, Commander, 3d Space Experimentation Squadron, Schriever AFB, Colo.
14. February 2015–May 2016, Executive Officer to the Commander, Joint Functional Component Command-Space and 14th Air Force (Air Forces Strategic), Vandenberg AFB, Calif.
15. June 2016–June 2017, Student, College of Naval Warfare, Naval War College, Newport, R.I.
16. June 2017–June 2018, Chief, Eurasia-America Operations Division, Checkmate, Headquarters USAF, Pentagon, Washington, D.C.
17. July 2018–April 2019, Chief, Programs Division, Headquarters Air Force Space Command, Peterson AFB, Colo.
18. May 2019–July 2020, Commander, 21st Operations Group, 21st Space Wing, Peterson Air Force Base, Colo.
19. July 2020–June 2021, Commander, Space Delta 2, Space Operations Command, Peterson AFB, Colo.
20. June 2021–July 2023, Director, Combat Power, Deputy Commanding General, Operations, Headquarters Space Operations Command, Peterson Space Force Base, Colo.
21. July 2023–May 2024, Chief, Current Operations Division, Operations Directorate, U.S. Space Command, Peterson SFB, Colo.
21. May 2024–present, Deputy Commander, Space Training and Readiness Command, U.S. Space Force, Peterson SFB, Colo.

== Personal life ==
Cantore is married to Laura Cantore from Brandon, Manitoba, Canada for 24–25 years. They have three kids.

== Awards and decorations ==
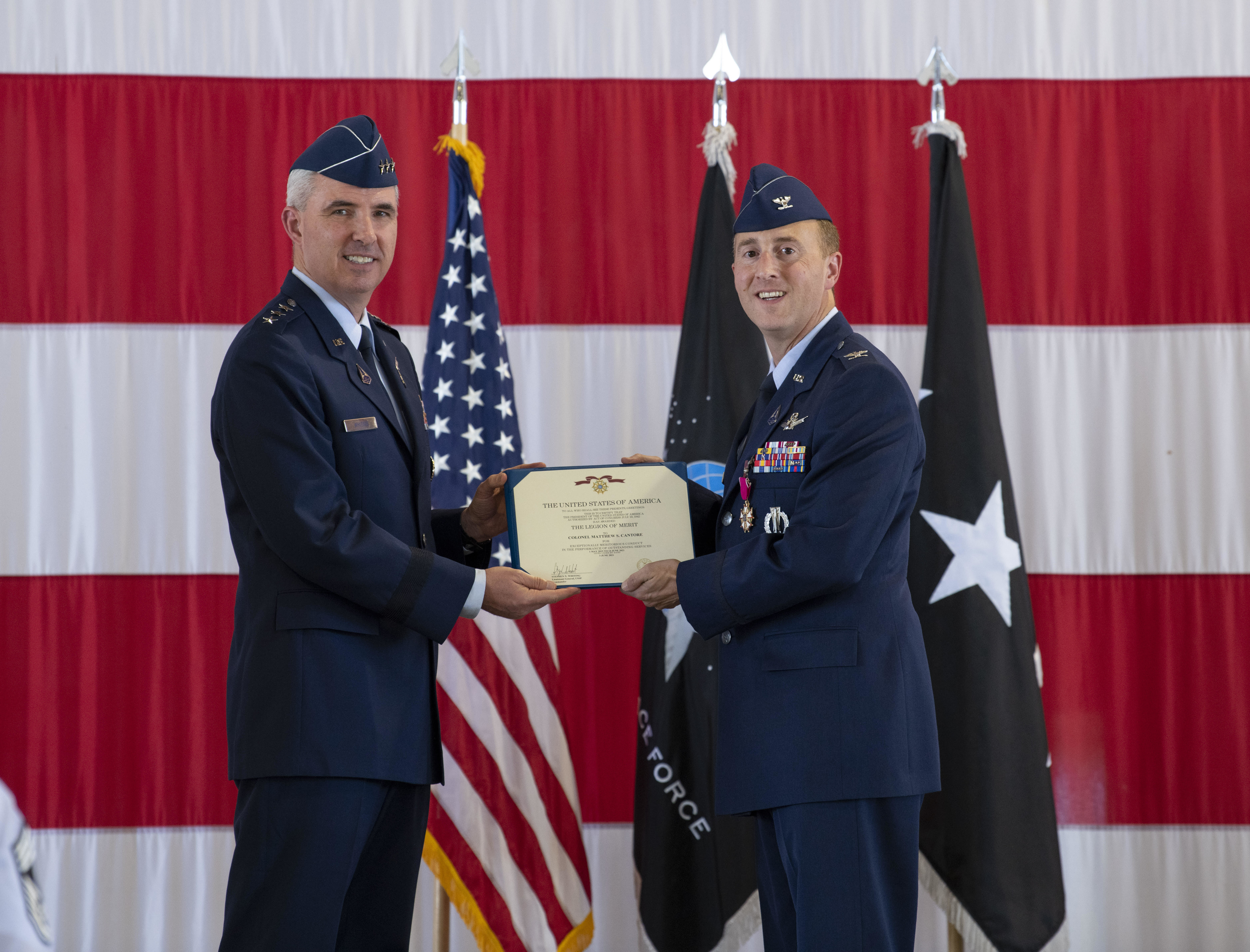
Cantore receives a Legion of Merit citation from Lt Gen Stephen Whiting, 2021

Cantore is the recipient of the following awards:

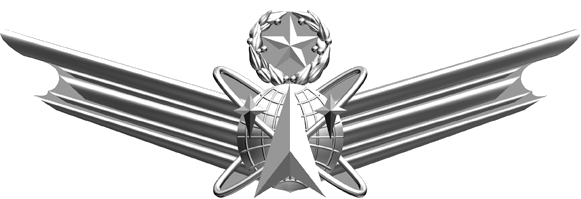
Command Space Operations Badge

Basic Missile Operations Badge

Office of the Joint Chiefs of Staff Identification Badge

Air Staff Badge

Commander's Insignia

Legion of Merit
Meritorious Service Medal
Meritorious Service Medal with one silver oak leaf cluster
Air Force Commendation Medal with four bronze oak leaf clusters
Air Force Achievement Medal
Joint Meritorious Unit Award
Air Force Outstanding Unit Award with one silver oak leaf cluster
Air Force Organizational Excellence Award
Combat Readiness Medal
National Defense Service Medal
Global War on Terrorism Service Medal
Nuclear Deterrence Operations Service Medal with "N" device and two bronze oak leaf clusters
Air Force Overseas Short Tour Service Ribbon
Air Force Longevity Service Award with four bronze oak leaf clusters
Air Force Training Ribbon

== Dates of promotion ==
Rank	Branch	Date
Second Lieutenant	Air Force	May 27, 1998
First Lieutenant	Air Force	May 27, 2000
Captain	Air Force	May 27, 2002
Major	Air Force	November 1, 2007
Lieutenant Colonel	Air Force	October 1, 2012
Colonel	Air Force	January 1, 2019
Colonel	Space Force	~September 30, 2020
Brigadier General	Space Force	February 1, 2024
Brigadier General	Space Force	September 26, 2026

Military offices
Preceded by Devin Pepper	Commander of Space Delta 2; 2019–2021	Succeeded by Marc A. Brock
New office	Director of Combat Power of Space Operations Command; 2021–2023	Succeeded by Marc A. Brock
Preceded by John G. Thien	Chief of Current Operations of the United States Space Command; 2023–2024	Succeeded by Mark C. Bigley
Preceded by Todd R. Moore	Deputy Commander of Space Training and Readiness Command; 2024–present	Incumbent
