= Advanced Systems and Development Directorate =

US military organization

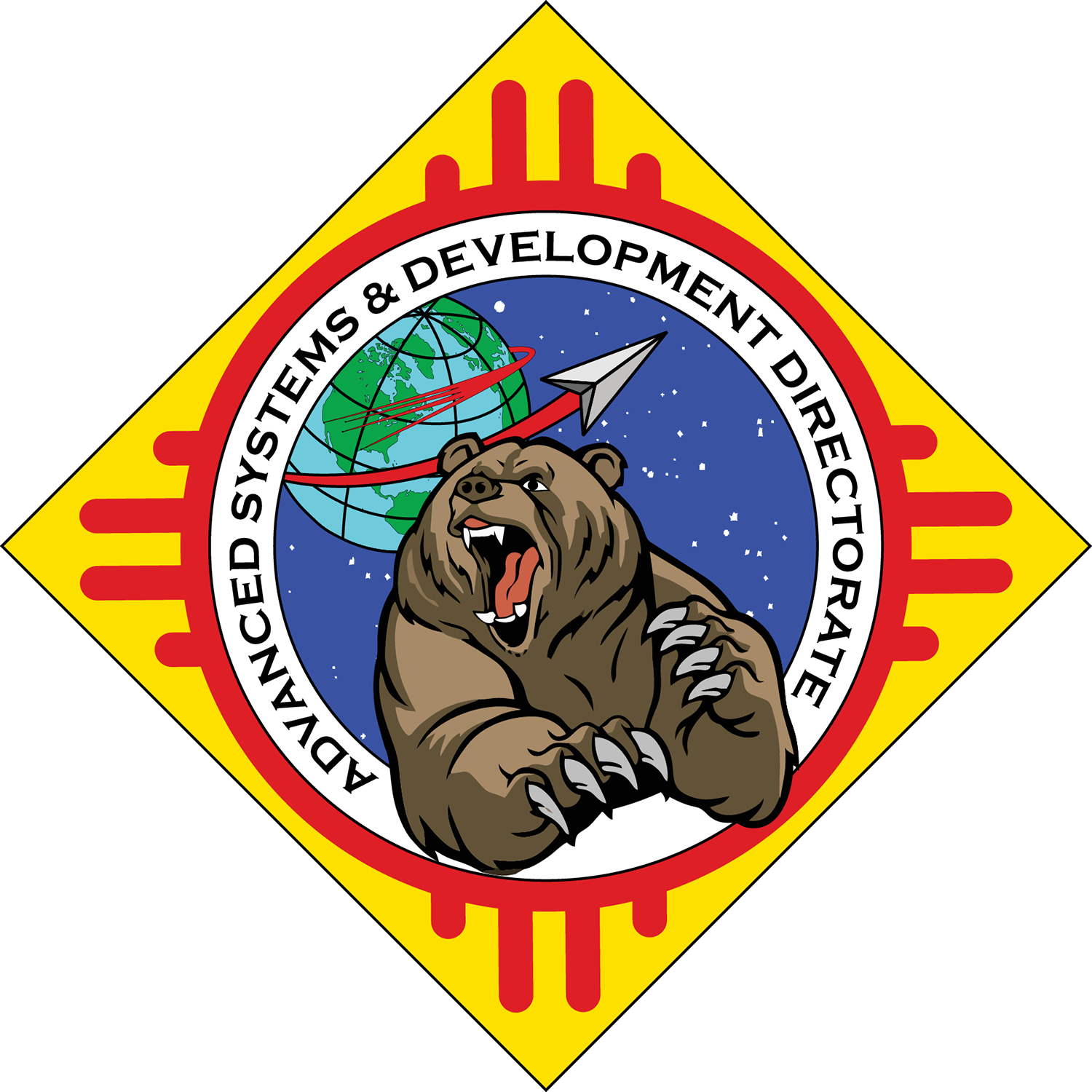
- Founded: 9 October 2014; 10 years, 5 months
- Country: United States
- Branch: United States Space Force
- Type: Directorate
- Size: 740 personnel
- Part of: Space and Missile Systems Center
- Garrison/HQ: Kirtland Air Force Base, New Mexico, U.S.

The Advanced Systems and Development Directorate (SMC/AD) is a directorate of the United States Space Force's Space and Missile Systems Center, located at Kirtland Air Force Base. It has operating divisions at Los Angeles Air Force Base, Hill Air Force Base, and Johnson Space Center.

== Structure ==
- Ground Systems and Operations Division (ADG)
- Space Demonstration Division (ADS)
- Strategic Concepts Division (ADX)
- Capability Integration and Transition Division (ADY)

== History ==
In June 1992 the Space and Missile Systems Center created the Space Experimentation Program Office, consolidating the Rocket Systems Launch Program (RSLP), Department of Defense Space Test Program (STP), the Research and Development Space and Missile Operations program (RDSMO), and test and evolution functions at Vandenberg Air Force Base into the new organization. In June 1993 the research, development, test and evaluation functions of the Space Test Program, located at Los Angeles Air Force Base, Research and Development Space and Missile Operations program, located at Onizuka Air Force Station, and the Rocket Systems Launch Program, located in San Bernardino, California, were moved to Kirtland Air Force Base.

In July 1995 the Space Experimentation Program Office was renamed the Space and Missile Test and Evaluation Directorate.

On 29 June 2001, the Space Experimentation Program Office became Space and Missile Systems Center Detachment 12, in preparation for the 1 October 2001 transfer of the Space and Missile Systems Center from Air Force Materiel Command to Air Force Space Command.

On 1 August 2006 the Space Development and Test Wing was activated, replacing SMC Directorate 12. On 10 November 2010 the Space Development and Test Wing was redesignated again, becoming the Space Development and Test Directorate (SMC/SD), part of the Space and Missile System Center's transition from a wing-structure to a directorate-structure.

On 9 October 2014 the Development Planning Directorate (SMC/XR) and Space Development and Test Directorate were deactivated, and activated the Advanced Systems and Development Directorate (SMC/AD).

== List of directors ==
- Col Troy A.J. Brashear, January 9, 2015–August 17, 2015
- Col John S.R. Anttonen, August 17, 2015–July 13, 2018
- Col Timothy Sejba, July 13, 2018–July 2020
