= Robert W. Parker (general) =

United States Air Force general

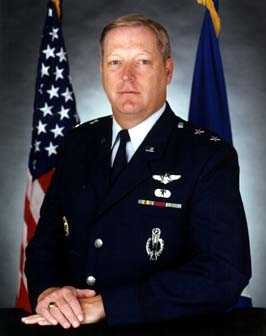
Maj. Gen. Robert W. Parker

Robert W. Parker is a retired major general in the United States Air Force.

== Career ==
Parker joined the Air Force in 1963. Later that year, he was assigned to the 741st Strategic Missile Squadron at Minot Air Force Base and underwent training at Vandenberg Air Force Base.

He was stationed at Ellsworth Air Force Base from 1964 to 1969, when he returned to Vandenberg Air Force Base. The following year, he was reassigned back to Ellsworth. From 1972 to 1976, Parker was assigned to Strategic Air Command. He was then stationed at the Pentagon from 1976 to 1980.

In 1981, Parker was assigned to the 321st Strategic Missile Wing at Grand Forks Air Force Base. From there, he became Vice Commander of the 341st Strategic Missile Wing at Malmstrom Air Force Base. Later that year, Parker assumed command of the wing. The following year, he returned to Grand Forks Air Force Base to assume command of the 321st.

In 1987, Parker returned to The Pentagon as a member of the staff in the Office of the Chairman of the Joint Chiefs of Staff. The following year, he became Senior Military Adviser to the Director of the Arms Control and Disarmament Agency. From 1991 to 1993, he was Director of the On-Site Inspection Agency.

From 1993 to 1994, Parker was Director of Operations of Air Force Space Command. In 1994, he assumed command of the Twentieth Air Force at Francis E. Warren Air Force Base. Parker retired in 1996.

Awards he received during his career include the Defense Distinguished Service Medal, the Legion of Merit, the Airman's Medal, the Meritorious Service Medal with oak leaf cluster, the Air Force Commendation Medal with oak leaf cluster, the Joint Meritorious Unit Award, the Outstanding Unit Award, the Combat Readiness Medal and the National Defense Service Medal with service star.

== Education ==
- Saint Michael's College
- Ohio State University
- Northwestern University
- John F. Kennedy School of Government - Harvard University
- Squadron Officer School
- Air Command and Staff College
- Industrial College of the Armed Forces
- Air War College
