= Combined Joint Task Force–Space Operations =

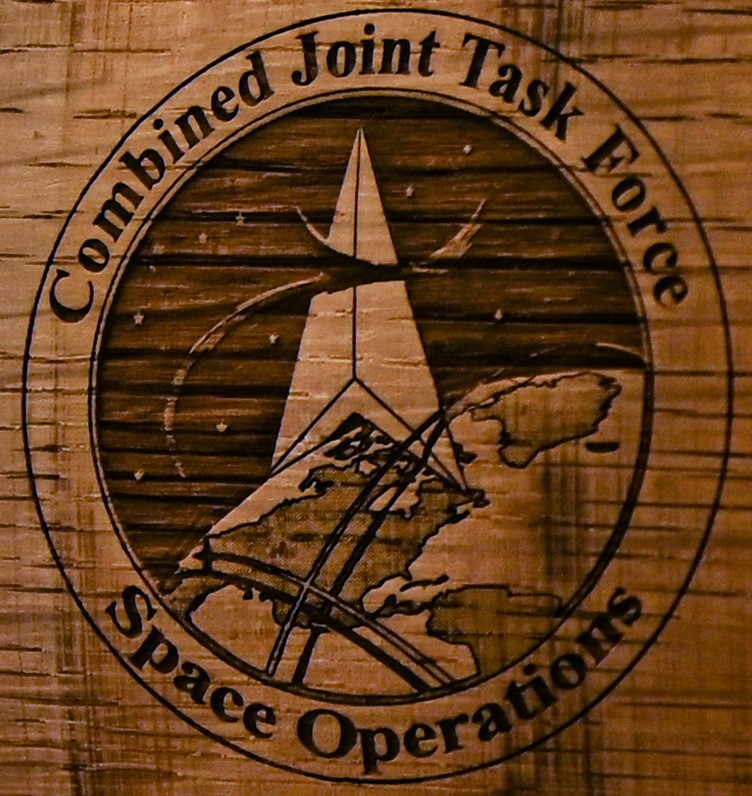
- Active: 15 November 2022–6 December 2023
- Country: United States
- Type: Subordinate command
- Role: Space operations
- Part of: U.S. Space Command
- Headquarters: Peterson Space Force Base, Colorado

The Combined Joint Task Force–Space Operations (CJTF–SO) was a subordinate command to the United States Space Command. It was activated on 15 November 2022 and inactivated on 6 December 2023 following the standup of United States Space Forces – Space.

== Structure ==
Combined Force Space Component Command (CFSCC), Vandenberg Space Force Base, California

- Combined Space Operations Center (CSpOC), Vandenberg Space Force Base, California
- Missile Warning Center (MWC), Cheyenne Mountain Space Force Station, Colorado
- Joint Overhead Persistent Infrared Center (JOPC), Buckley Space Force Base, Colorado
- Joint Navigation Warfare Center (JNWC), Kirtland Air Force Base, New Mexico

Joint Task Force–Space Defense (JTF–SD), Schriever Space Force Base, Colorado

- National Space Defense Center (NSDC), Schriever Space Force Base, Colorado

== List of commanders ==
No.	Commander		Term			Service branch
No.	Portrait	Name	Took office	Left office	Term length	Service branch
–	Thomas L. James	Lieutenant General; Thomas L. James; Acting	15 November 2022	6 December 2023	1 year, 21 days	U.S. Army

== See also ==
- United States Space Command
