= United States Space Forces – Space =

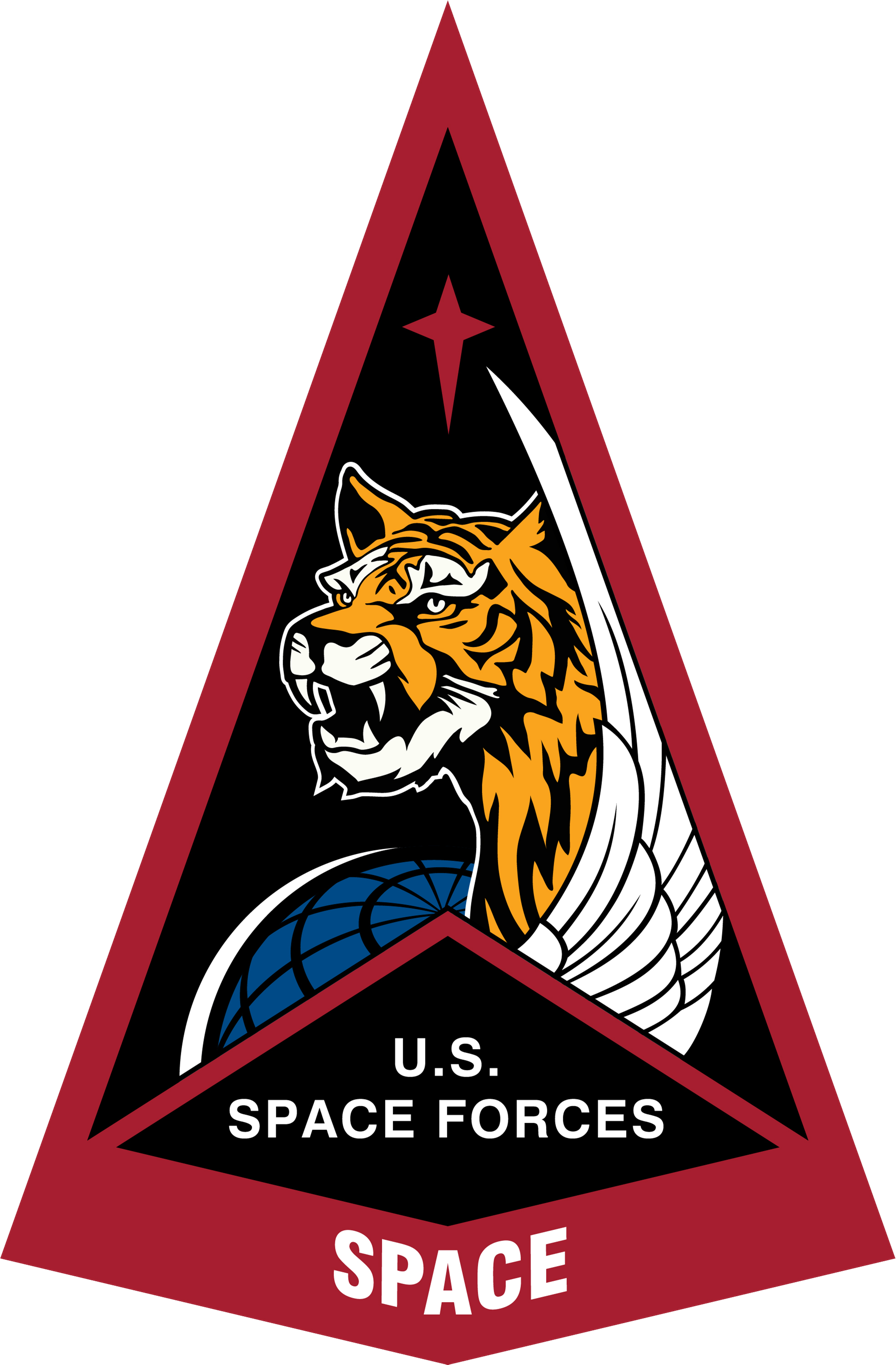
- S4S emblem
- Founded: 6 December 2023; 1017 days
- Country: United States
- Branch: United States Space Force
- Type: Component field command
- Role: Space operations
- Part of: United States Space Command
- Headquarters: Vandenberg Space Force Base, California
- Engagements: 2026 Iran war

Commanders
- Commander: Lt Gen Dennis Bythewood
- Deputy Commander: Brig Gen Frank R. Kincaid
- Command Senior Enlisted Leader: CMSgt Tina R. Timmerman

Insignia
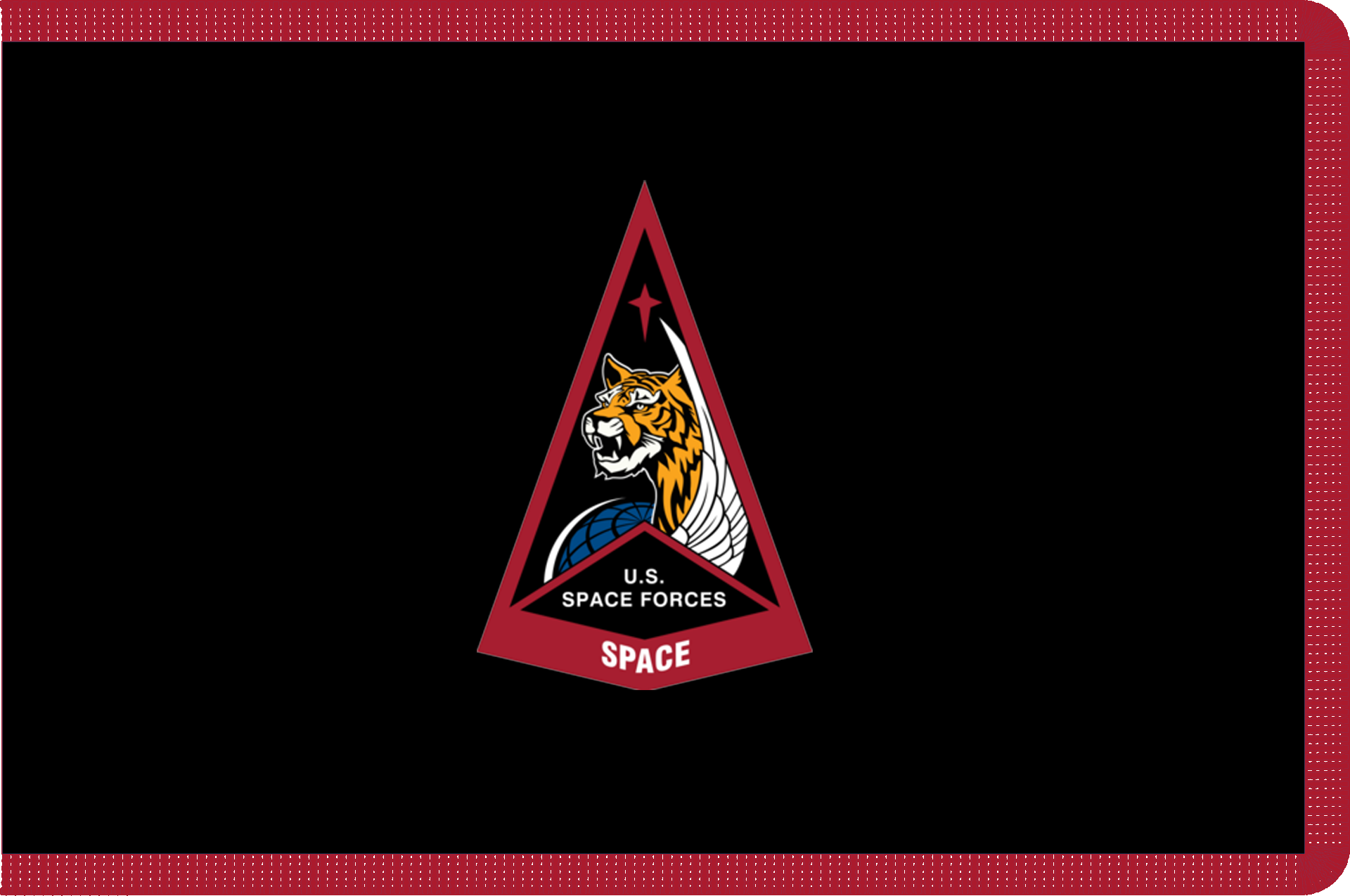
- Flag of US Space Forces - Space

The United States Space Forces – Space (S4S, SPACEFOR–SPACE) is the United States Space Force component field command to the United States Space Command. It was formed by combining the Combined Force Space Component Command and Joint Task Force–Space Defense. Its commander also serves as the combined joint force space component commander (CJFSCC). It was activated on 6 December 2023.

== History ==
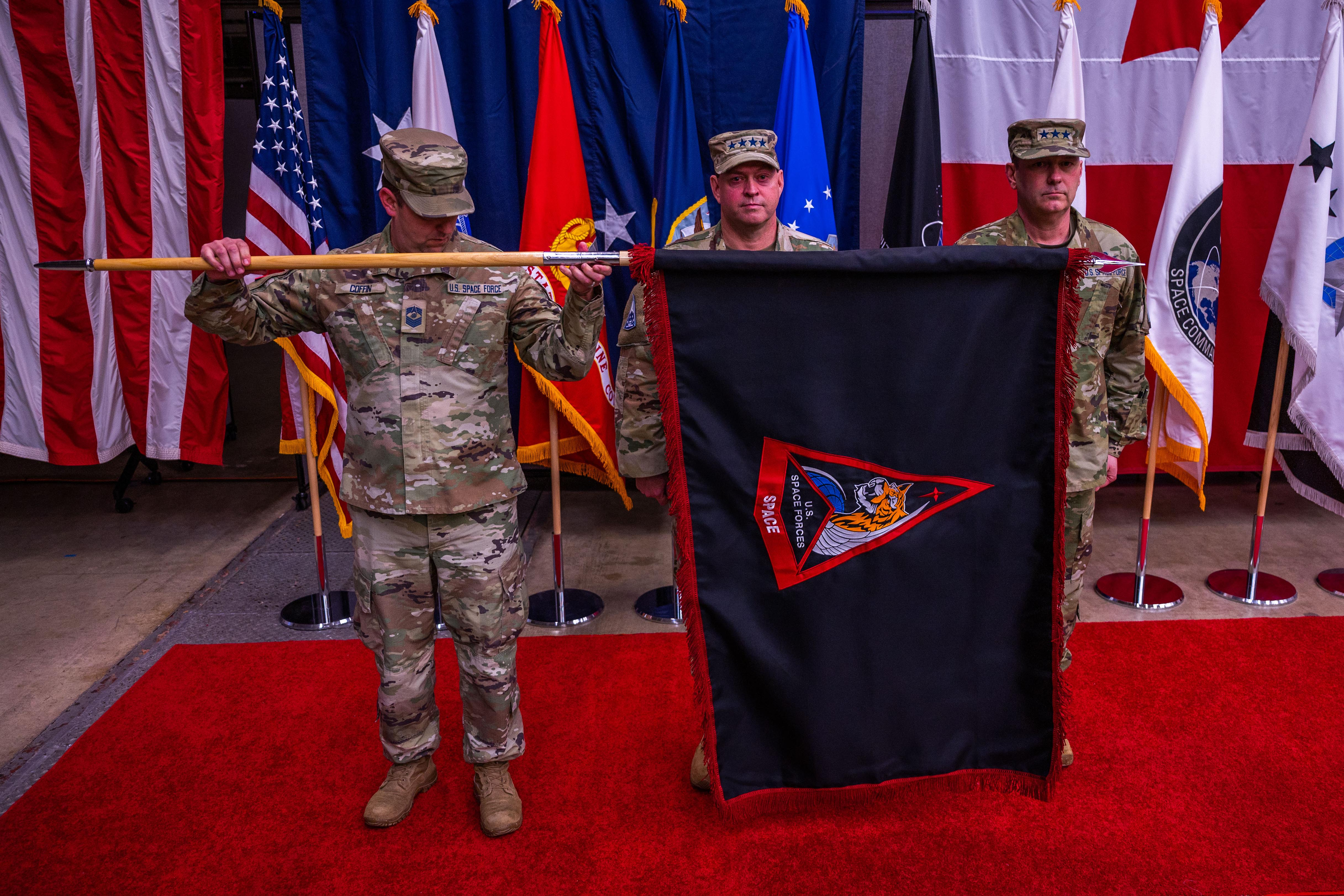
S4S activation ceremony, 31 January 2024

In 2021, the United States Space Command began thinking about creating a subordinate command that streamlines space operations. Initial plans were to establish a Joint Force Space Component Command by combining the Combined Force Space Component Command (CFSCC) and Joint Task Force–Space Defense (JTF-SD). On 16 November 2022, General James H. Dickinson, U.S Space Command commander, ordered the creation of the Combined Joint Task Force–Space Operations (CJTF-SO), under which CFSCC and JTF-SD reported. U.S. Army Major General Thomas L. James served as acting commander of CJTF-SO until a three-star commander was nominated and confirmed.

By 2023, no officer has been nominated as CJTF-SO commander. Meanwhile, plans shifted for the Space Force to create a new component field command to U.S. Space Command, the United States Space Forces – Space (S4S). It would be commanded with a three-star officer with the director of staff of the Space Force being downgraded to a two-star billet to make way for it. On 17 October 2023, U.S. Space Force Major General Douglas Schiess was nominated for promotion to lieutenant general and assignment as the first commander of S4S. As S4S commander, he would also serve as the combined joint space component commander (CJFSCC).

Following the confirmation of Schiess's nomination, S4S was activated on 6 December 2023 by redesignating Space Operations Command West as S4S. CFSCC and JTF-SD were also inactivated. On 31 January 2024, a ceremony presided by General B. Chance Saltzman and General Stephen Whiting was held to commemorate the activation of S4S.

During the Iran war that began on 28 February 2026, S4S was one of the elements of the Space Force involved in Operation Epic Fury.

== Structure ==
Name	Space mission deltas	
Space Delta 5	Combined Space Operations Center	Vandenberg Space Force Base, California
Space Delta 15	National Space Defense Center	Schriever Space Force Base, Colorado

Generally, the missions of the two deltas can be understood as Space Delta 5 / CSOC, a multinational ("combined") body controlling activities which are going on in space, primarily satellite control; and Space Delta 15, NSDC, carrying out space warfare. Space warfare or space superiority can involve activities actually underway in space; anti-satellite missile launches (historical U.S. systems have included the Program 437 and the ASM-135 ASAT); and jamming of communications by ground-based means.

== List of commanders ==
No.	Commander		Term			Ref
No.	Portrait	Name	Took office	Left office	Term length	Ref
1	Douglas Schiess	Lieutenant General; Douglas Schiess (born 1970)	6 December 2023	4 November 2025	1 year, 333 days	
2	Dennis Bythewood	Lieutenant General; Dennis Bythewood (born c. 1970)	4 November 2025	Incumbent	318 days	

== See also ==
- United States Space Command
- United States Space Force
- Pacific Air Forces
