= Bythewood =

Bythewood is an uncommon surname. Notable people with the surname include:

- Dennis Bythewood (born 1970), American program executive officer
- Reggie Rock Bythewood (born 1965), American producer, screenwriter, director, and actor
  - Gina Prince-Bythewood (born 1969), American director, screenwriter, and producer
