= Thomas L. James =

US Army general

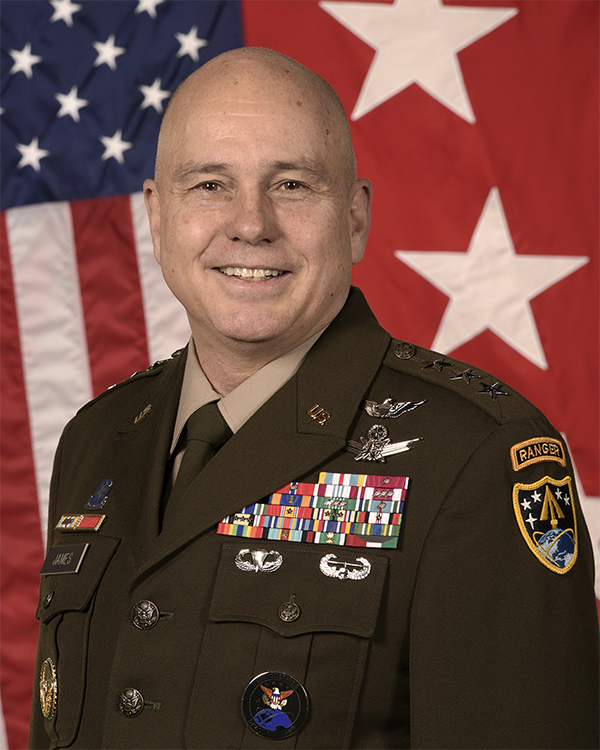
- Official portrait, 2024
- Born: c. 1968 (age 57–58); Petal, Mississippi, U.S.
- Military career
- Allegiance: United States
- Branch: United States Army
- Service years: 1983–2025
- Rank: Lieutenant General
- Commands: Combined Joint Task Force–Space Operations (acting); Joint Task Force–Space Defense; 1st Space Brigade; 1st Space Battalion; B Company, 2nd Assault Helicopter Battalion, 4th Aviation Brigade
- Conflicts: Gulf War; War in Afghanistan; Iraq War
- Awards: Defense Superior Service Medal; Legion of Merit (2); Bronze Star Medal (2)

Thomas L. James (c. 1968) is a retired United States Army lieutenant general who served as the deputy commander of the United States Space Command. He previously served as the acting commander of Combined Joint Task Force–Space Operations. He is the first Army space operations officer to reach the rank of major general.

== Military career ==
James first enlisted in the Mississippi National Guard in 1983, where he was assigned in medical and special forces units. After obtaining a degree, he was commissioned into the United States Army in 1990 as an army aviator.

On 15 July 2014, James took command of the 1st Space Brigade. After this command tour, he was assigned as the director of space policy implementation of Office of the Under Secretary for Policy.

James served as deputy commander of the Joint Functional Component Command for Space. While in this position, he was promoted to brigadier general on 14 November 2017. After a 2017 reorganization, he then served as the director of operations, plans, and exercises of the Joint Force Space Component Command.

With the creation of the United States Space Command in August 2019, James became the director of operations while dual-hatted as the first commander of the newly established Joint Task Force–Space Defense (JTF-SD). After almost two years, he was nominated for promotion to major general. In 2021, he released his vision for the unit. He got promoted on 29 July 2021, making him the first Army space operations officer to achieve the rank of major general.

James relinquished command of JTF-SD on 4 November 2022. He thereafter was assigned as deputy commander of Combined Joint Task Force-Space Operations, a planned subordinate command of U.S. Space Command.

In July 2023, James was nominated for promotion to lieutenant general with assignment as the deputy commander of United States Space Command.

== Dates of promotion ==
| Rank | Date |
|---|---|
| Brigadier general | 2 November 2017 |
| Major general | 29 July 2021 |
| Lieutenant general | 5 December 2023 |

Military offices
| Preceded by James R. Meisinge | Commander of the 1st Space Brigade; 2014–2016 | Succeeded by Richard Zellman |
| Preceded by Brian B. Brown | Deputy Commander of the Joint Functional Component Command for Space; 2017 | Succeeded by Stephen Whiting |
| New office | Director of Operations of the United States Space Command; 2019–2020 | Succeeded by William G. Holt |
| New office | Commander of Joint Task Force–Space Defense; 2019–2022 | Succeeded by Dennis Bythewood |
| Preceded by Tim C. Lawson | Deputy Commander of Combined Joint Task Force–Space Operations; 2022 | Succeeded by Brook J. Leonard |
| New office | Commander of Combined Joint Task Force–Space Operations; Acting; 2022–2023 | Unit inactivated |
| Preceded by John E. Shaw | Deputy Commander of the United States Space Command; 2023–2025 | Succeeded by Richard Zellman |
