= Joint Task Force–Space Defense =

- Joint Task Force–Space Defense shield
- Active: 29 August 2019–6 December 2023
- Country: United States
- Type: Joint task force
- Role: Space defense
- Part of: Combined Joint Task Force–Space Operations
- Headquarters: Schriever Space Force Base, Colorado, U.S.
- Website: www.jtf-spacedefense.mil

Insignia
- Flag

The Joint Task Force–Space Defense (JTF–SD) was a joint task force and subordinate command of United States Space Command. It was responsible for executing control of space defense and space domain awareness units to protect and defend U.S. space capabilities.

== Mission ==
Joint Task Force–Space Defense's mission was to "conduct, in unified action with mission partners, space superiority operations to deter aggression, defend U.S. and Allied interests, and defeat adversaries throughout the continuum of conflict."

== Structure ==
Joint Task Force–Space Defense included:

- National Space Defense Center (NSDC), Schriever Space Force Base, Colorado

== History ==
Joint Task Force–Space Defense was established immediately after the establishment of United States Space Command on August 29, 2019.A ceremony recognizing the establishment of the JTF–SD was held on October 21, 2019 at Schriever AFB.

JTF–SD was inactivated on 6 December 2023 with the activation of United States Space Forces – Space. On 8 January 2024, a ceremony was held to inactivate JTF–SD.

== List of commanders ==
No.	Commander		Term			Service branch
No.	Portrait	Name	Took office	Left office	Term length	Service branch
1	Thomas L. James	Major General; Thomas L. James	29 August 2019	4 November 2022	3 years, 67 days	U.S. Army
2	Dennis Bythewood	Brigadier General; Dennis Bythewood	4 November 2022	6 December 2023	1 year, 32 days	U.S. Space Force

== See also ==
- Combined Force Space Component Command
