= Dennis Bythewood =

U.S. Space Force general officer

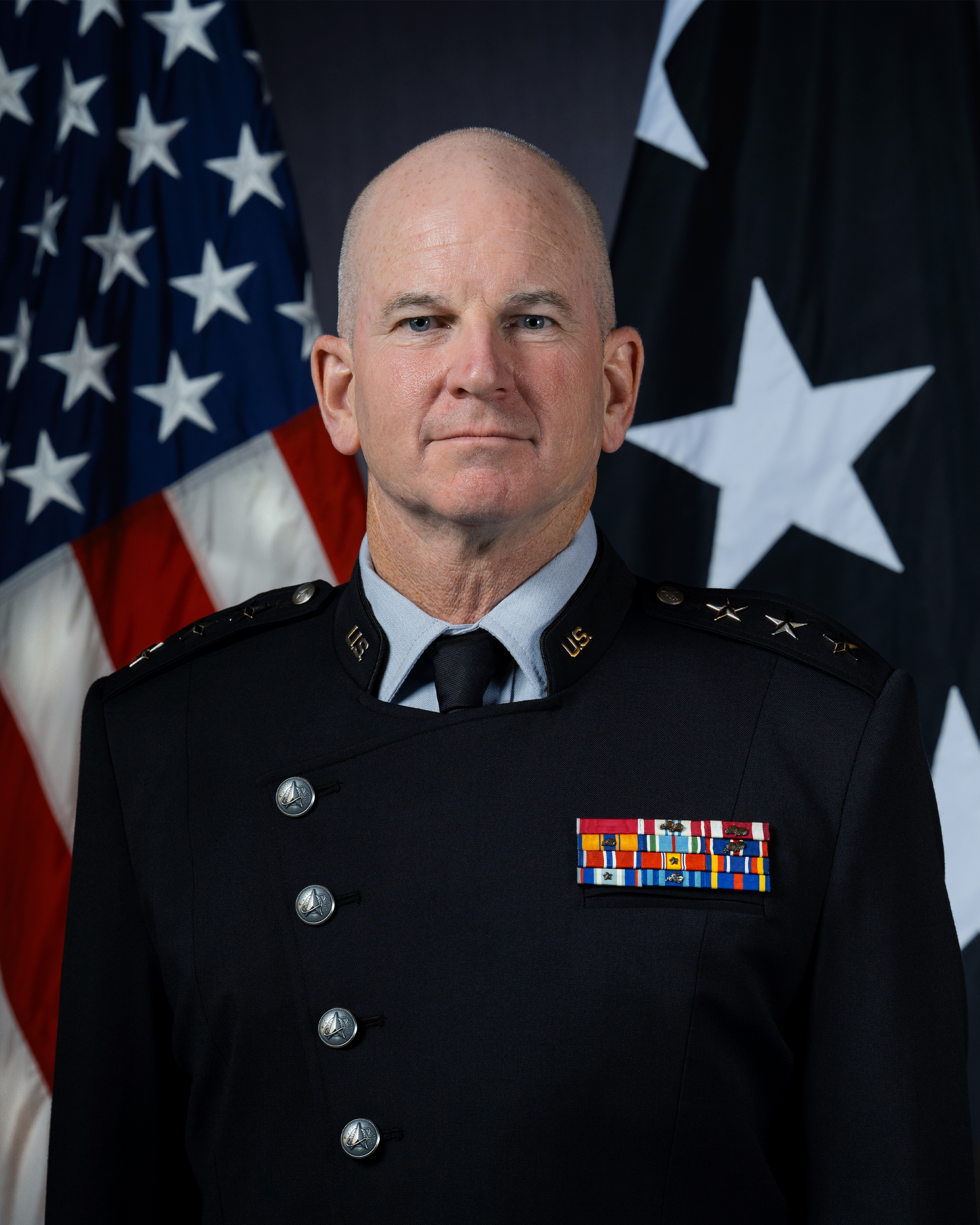
- Official portrait, 2025
- Born: c. 1970 (age 55–56)
- Education: University of Vermont (BS): University of Colorado–Colorado Springs (MBA)
- Spouse: Jahnna Perkin (m. 1998)
- Military career
- Allegiance: United States
- Branch: United States Air Force: United States Space Force
- Service years: 1992–2021 (Air Force): 2021–present (Space Force)
- Rank: Lieutenant General
- Commands: United States Space Forces – Space: Remote Sensing Systems Directorate; 50th Operations Group; Space Communications Operations Squadron, NRO
- Awards: Legion of Merit (2)

Dennis O. Bythewood (born c. 1970) is a United States Space Force lieutenant general who serves as commander of United States Space Forces – Space and combined joint force space component commander of the United States Space Command. He previously served as the deputy commander of the United States Space Forces – Space.

== Education ==
- 1992 Bachelor of Science in Electrical Engineering, University of Vermont, Burlington, VT.
- 1998 Squadron Officer School, Maxwell AFB, AL.
- 2003 Air Command and Staff College (correspondence), Maxwell AFB, AL.
- 2004 Master of Business Administration, University of Colorado-Colorado Springs, CO.
- 2007 Air War College (correspondence), Maxwell AFB, AL.

== Military career ==
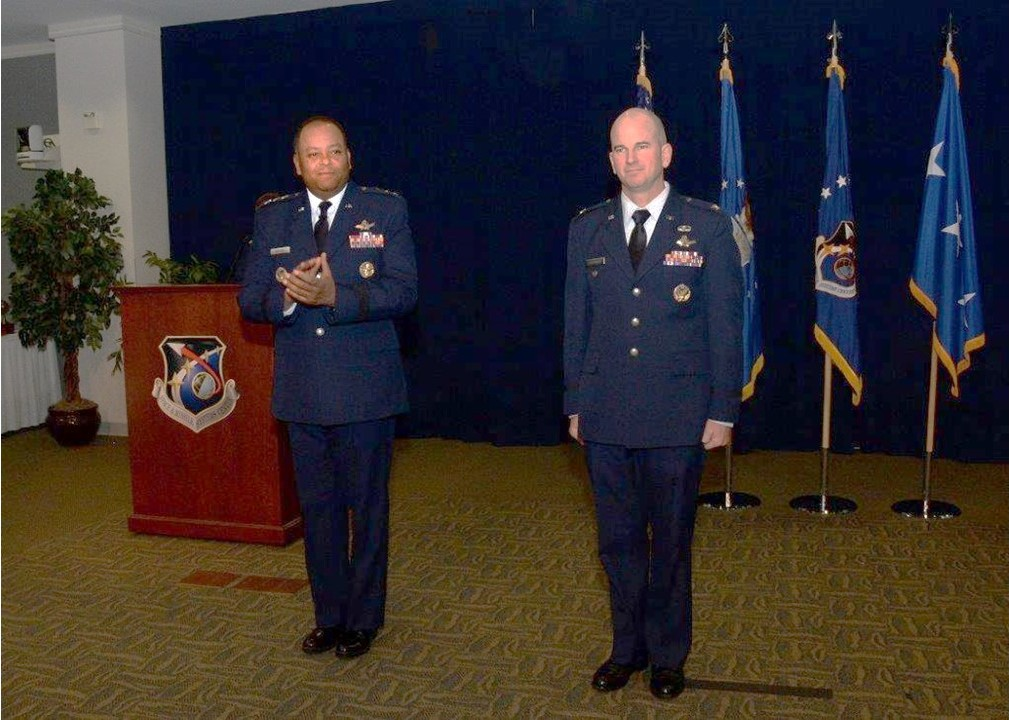
Bythewood with Lt Gen Greaves as he takes the helm of the Remote Sensing Systems Directorate, 2016

Bythewood served as the director for special programs of the Space and Missile Systems Center. He was nominated in January 2021 for promotion to brigadier general and transfer to the United States Space Force.

In April 2024, Bythewood was nominated for promotion to major general. His nomination was confirmed on May 2, 2024. On May 3, 2024, he was promoted to major general. In September 2025, Bythewood was nominated for promotion to lieutenant general and confirmed by the U.S. Senate on October 30, 2025. Lt Gen Bythewood was promoted to his present rank on November 4, 2025.

=== Assignments ===
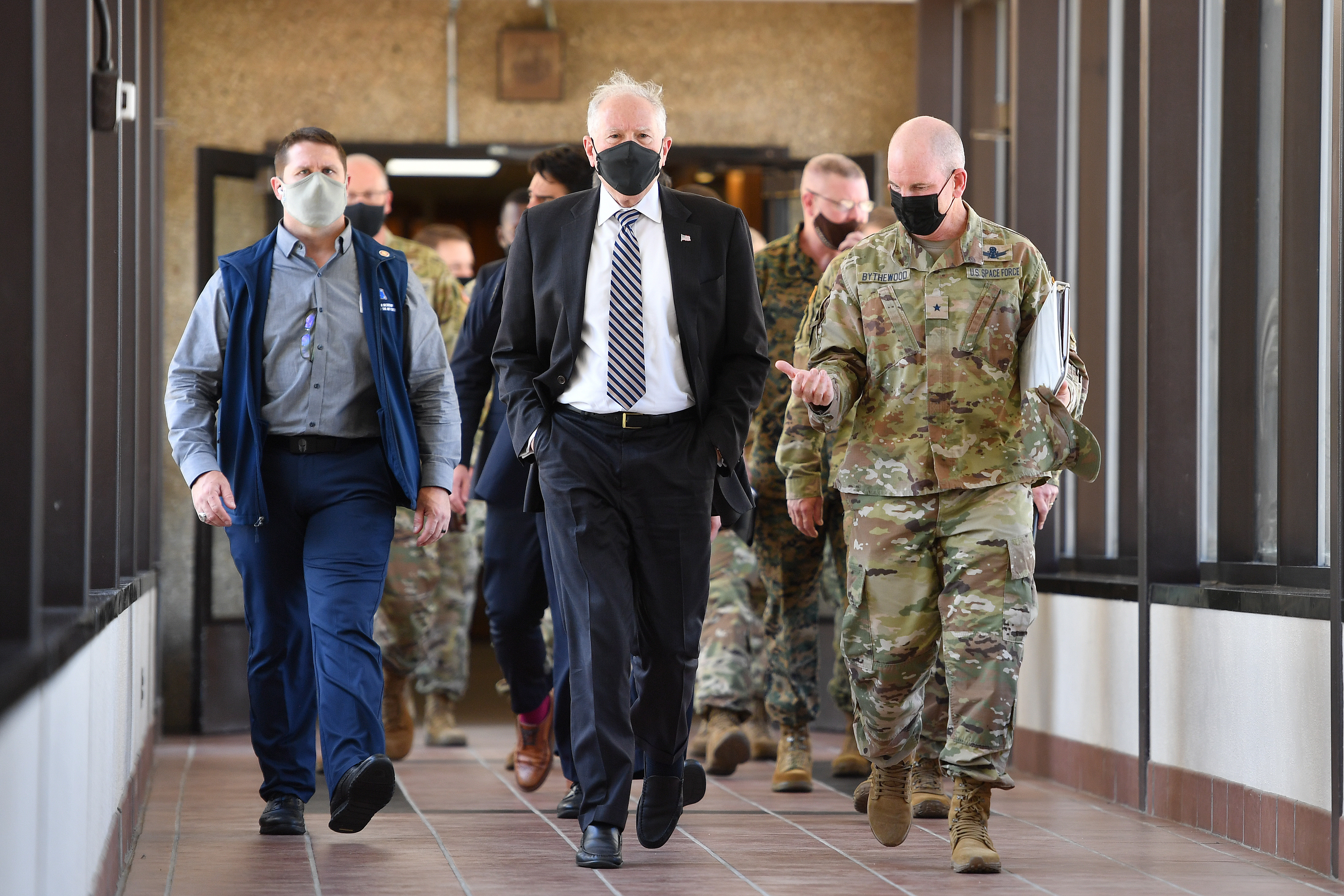
Bythewood tours Secretary Kendall at Schriever Space Force Base, 2021

1. October 1992 – June 1996, Range System Manager, 501st Range Squadron, Hill AFB, UT
2. July 1996 – August 1999, Electric Combat Analyst and Chief, Unmanned Air Vehicle Branch, Detachment 1, 31st Test and Evaluation Squadron, Kirtland AFB, NM
3. August 1999 – June 2002, Chief, Test and Certification, System Test Division, Milstar Joint Program Office, Los Angeles AFB, CA
4. July 2002 – October 2005, Chief of Engineering, Operations Support Flight Commander and Operations Officer, 4th Space Operations Squadron, Schriever AFB, CO
5. November 2005 – July 2007, Chief, MILSATCOM Operations Branch, HAF/DCS, Air, Space and Information Operations, Plans, Requirements, Pentagon, Washington, D.C.
6. August 2007 – May 2009, Executive Officer, SAF/SO, Air Forces Smart Operations, Pentagon, Washington, D.C.
7. June 2009 – June 2011, Commander, Space Communications Operations Squadron, Network Operations Group, Mission Operations Directorate, National Reconnaissance Office, Los Angeles, CA
8. July 2011 – July 2013, Materiel Leader, Space Based Infrared System Production, Infrared Space Systems Directorate, Space and Missile Systems Center, Los Angeles AFB, CA
9. August 2013 – June 2014, Director, Ground Frontiers Office, Ground Enterprise Directorate, National Reconnaissance Office, Chantilly, VA
10. July 2014 – June 2016, Commander, 50th Operations Group, Schriever AFB, CO
11. July 2016 – December 2016, Special Assistant to the Director, Remote Sensing Systems Directorate, Los Angeles AFB, CA
12. December 2016 – October 2018, Senior Materiel Leader & Director, Remote Sensing Systems Directorate, Los Angeles AFB, CA
13. October 2018 – July 2020, Director, Space Development Corps and Program Executive Officer for Space Development, Los Angeles AFB, CA
14. July 2020 – June 2021, Senior Materiel Leader and Director, Special Programs, Space and Missile Systems Center, Los Angeles AFB, Calif.
15. July 2021 – November 2022, Deputy Commander, Joint Task Force-Space Defense, U.S. Space Command Schriever AFB, Colo.
16. November 2022 – December 2023, Commander, Joint Task Force-Space Defense, U.S. Space Command Schriever AFB, Colo.
17. August 2023 – December 2023, Deputy Commander, Combined Force Space Component Command, U.S. Space Command, Vandenberg Space Force Base, California
18. December 2023 – July 2024, Deputy Commander, U.S. Space Forces - Space, U.S. Space Command, Vandenberg SFB, Calif.
19. August 2024-October 2025, Special Assistant, Chief of Space Operations, the Pentagon, Arlington, Va.
20. November 2025–present, Commander, U. S. Space Forces – Space, U.S. Space Force; and Combined Joint Space Force Component Commander, U. S. Space Command, Vandenberg SFB, Calif.

== Personal life ==
Bythewood married Jahnna Perkin on October 24, 1998

== Awards and decorations ==
Bythewood is the recipient of the following awards:

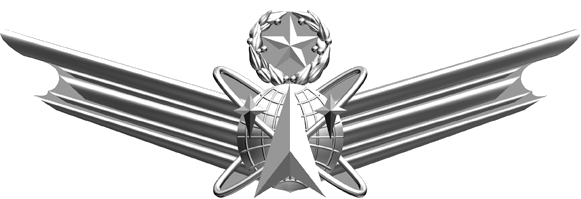
Command Space Operations Badge

Basic Parachutist Badge

Air Staff Badge

Legion of Merit with one bronze oak leaf cluster
Defense Meritorious Service Medal with two bronze oak leaf clusters
Meritorious Service Medal with two bronze oak leaf clusters
Air Force Commendation Medal with two bronze oak leaf clusters
Joint Service Achievement Medal
Air Force Outstanding Unit Award with two bronze oak leaf clusters
Air Force Organizational Excellence Award
National Defense Service Medal with one bronze service star
Global War on Terrorism Service Medal
Air and Space Campaign Medal with one bronze service star
Air Force Longevity Service Award with one silver oak leaf cluster
Air Force Training Ribbon

== Dates of promotion ==
Rank	Branch	Date
Second Lieutenant	Air Force	May 15, 1992
First Lieutenant	Air Force	June 1, 1994
Captain	Air Force	June 1, 1996
Major	Air Force	February 1, 2003
Lieutenant Colonel	Air Force	February 1, 2008
Colonel	Air Force	April 1, 2014
Colonel	Space Force	~September 30, 2020
Brigadier General	Space Force	August 17, 2021
Major General	Space Force	May 3, 2024
Lieutenant General	Space Force	November 4, 2025

Military offices
Preceded by Tommy A. Roberts	Commander of the 50th Operations Group; 2014–2016	Succeeded by Toby Doran
Preceded by Michael Guetlein	Director of the Remote Sensing Systems Directorate; 2016–2018	Directorate inactivated
New office	Program Executive Officer for Space Development of the Space and Missile Systems Center; 2018–2020	Succeeded by Timothy Sejba
Preceded by Stephen G. Purdy	Director of Special Programs of the Space and Missile Systems Center; 2020–2021	Succeeded by Bradley Walker
Preceded by Christopher Povak	Deputy Commander of Joint Task Force–Space Defense; 2021–2022	Succeeded by Elizabeth Helland
Preceded by Thomas L. James	Commander of Joint Task Force–Space Defense; 2022–2023	Commands inactivated
Preceded by Zachary S. Warakomski	Deputy Commander of the Combined Force Space Component Command; 2023	Commands inactivated
New unit	Deputy Commander of the United States Space Forces – Space; 2023–2024	Succeeded by Frank R. Kincaid
Preceded by Douglas Schiess	Commander of United States Space Forces – Space and Combined Joint Force Space Component Commander of the United States Space Command; 2025–present	Incumbent
