= Space Delta 15 =

U.S. Space Force unit

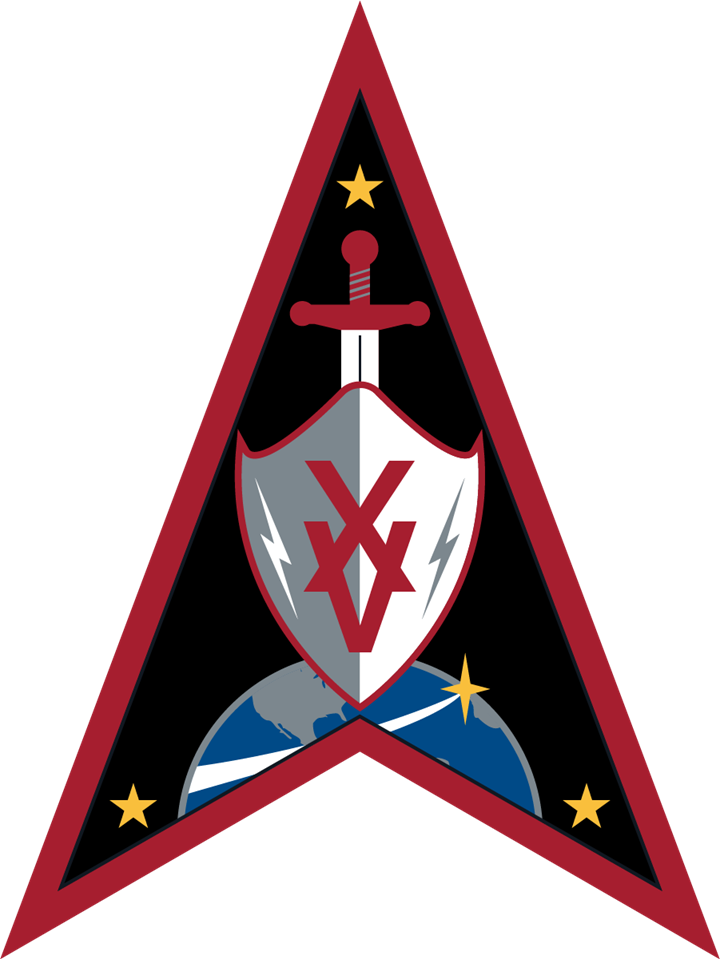
- DEL 15 emblem
- Founded: 23 March 2023; 3 years ago
- Country: United States
- Branch: United States Space Force
- Type: Delta
- Role: Command and control
- Part of: United States Space Forces – Space
- Headquarters: Schriever Space Force Base, Colorado

Commanders
- Commander: Col Bryan L. Bell
- Deputy Commander: Col Samuel R. Oppelaar II
- Senior Enlisted Leader: SMSgt Kristopher-Michael K. Kainoa

Insignia
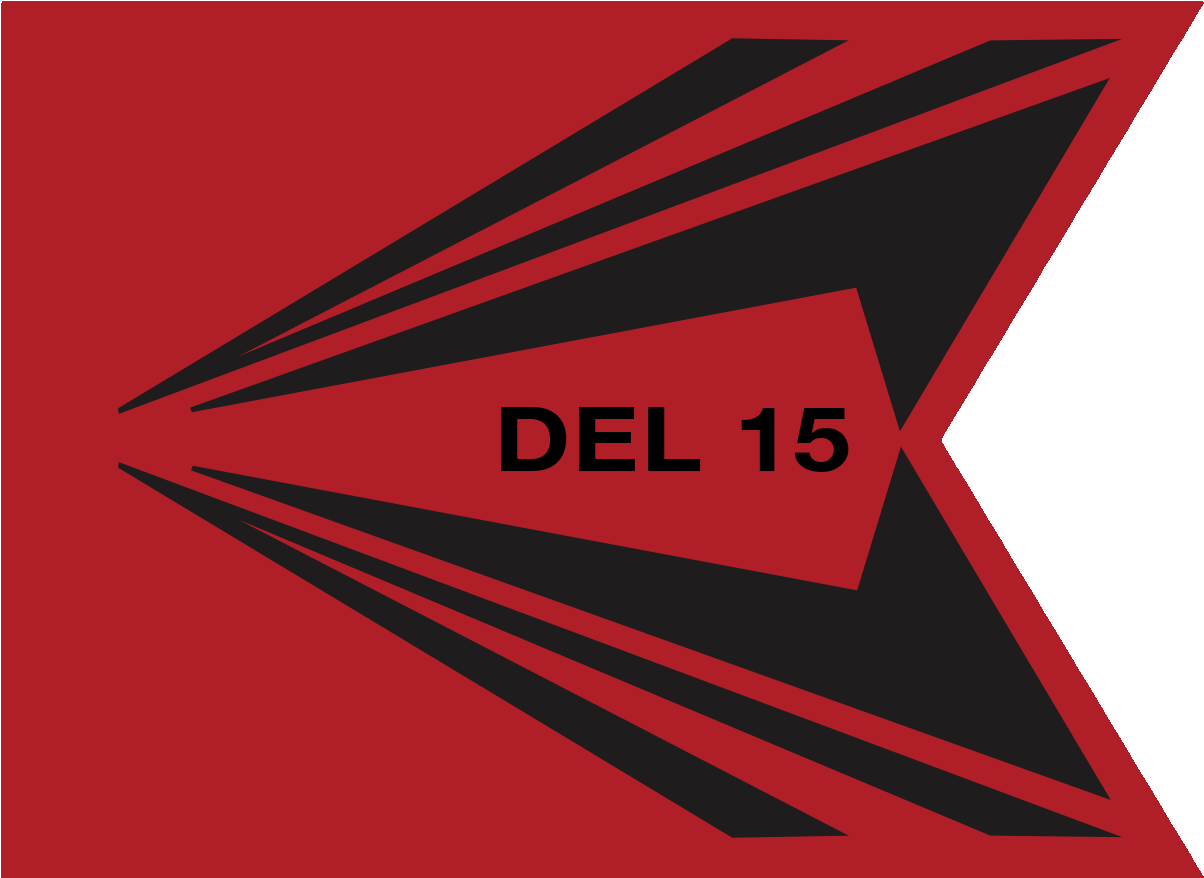
- SPACE DELTA 15 GUIDON

Space Delta 15 (DEL 15) is a United States Space Force unit responsible for presenting forces to the National Space Defense Center. It was established on 10 March 2023 as part of Space Operations Command and in December 2023 moved into United States Space Forces – Space. It is headquartered at Schriever Space Force Base, Colorado.

== History ==
DEL 15 was activated on 10 March 2023. On 10 June 2023, the 15th Command and Control Squadron (15 CACS) was activated, while the 15th Intelligence, Surveillance, and Reconnaissance Squadron (15 ISRS) was activated on 14 July 2023. On 20 October 2023, the 15th Cyberspace Squadron was activated.

On 20 November, 2024, the Department of the Air Force selected Schriever Space Force Base as the location to host Space Delta 15, with 250 manpower authorizations. Space Delta 15 is set to be fully operational in the summer of 2027.

== Structure ==
DEL 15 is composed of three squadrons. It added the 15th Cyber Squadron (15 CYS) in 2023.

Unit		Function	Headquarters
S Q U A D R O N S	15th Command and Control Squadron	Command and control	Schriever Space Force Base, Colorado
S Q U A D R O N S	15th Cyberspace Squadron	Cyberspace operations	Schriever Space Force Base, Colorado
S Q U A D R O N S	15th Intelligence, Surveillance and Reconnaissance Squadron	Intelligence, surveillance, and reconnaissance	Schriever Space Force Base, Colorado

== List of commanders ==
No.	Commander		Term			Ref
No.	Portrait	Name	Took office	Left office	Term length	Ref
1	Stephen G. Lyon	Colonel; Stephen G. Lyon	10 March 2023	2 June 2025	2 years, 84 days	
2	Bryan L. Bell	Colonel; Bryan L. Bell	2 June 2025	Incumbent	1 year, 72 days	
