= Douglas Schiess =

U.S. Space Force general officer

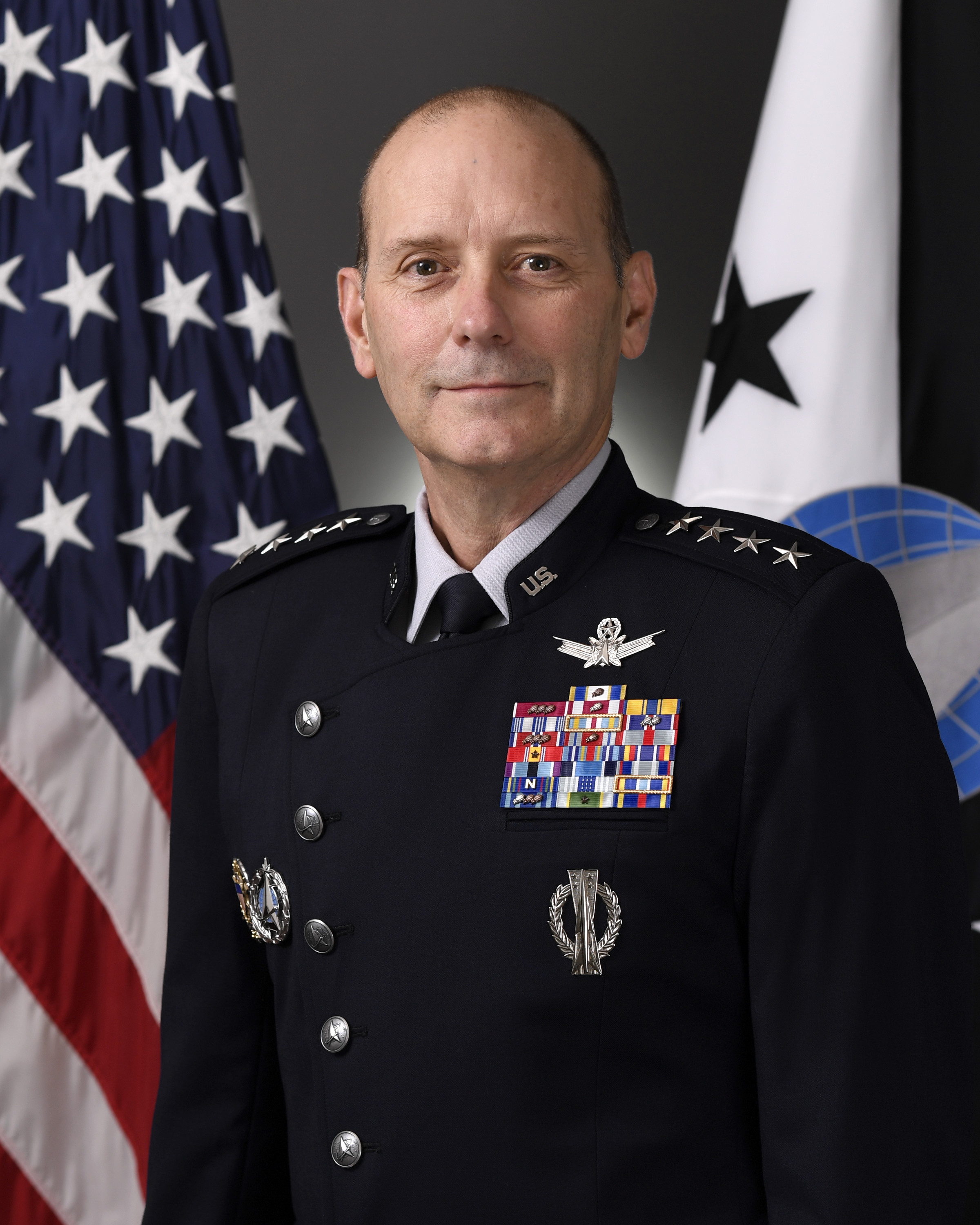
- Official portrait, 2026
- Born: 5 February 1970 (age 56); Yucaipa, California, U.S.
- Education: California State Polytechnic University, Pomona (BS): Central Michigan University (MS); George Washington University (MA)
- Spouse: Debbie Schiess (m. 1990)
- Military career
- Allegiance: United States
- Branch: United States Air Force: United States Space Force
- Service years: 1992–2022 (Air Force): 2022–present (Space Force)
- Rank: General
- Commands: Chief of Space Operations: United States Space Forces – Space; Combined Force Space Component Command; 45th Space Wing; 21st Space Wing; 45th Operations Group; 4th Space Operations Squadron
- Conflicts: War in Afghanistan
- Awards: Air Force Distinguished Service Medal (2); Legion of Merit (4)

Signature
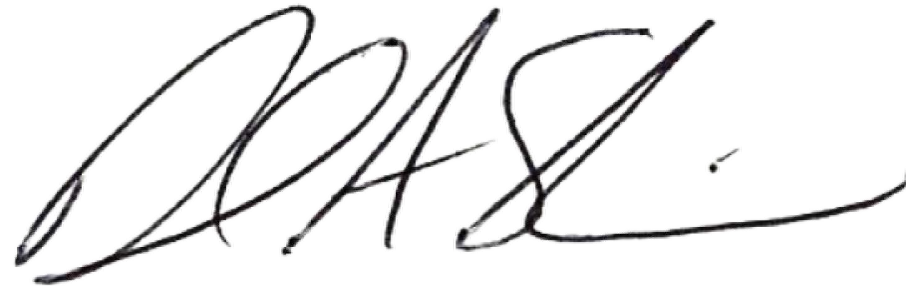

Douglas Andrew Schiess (born 5 February 1970) is a United States Space Force general who serves as the third and current chief of space operations. He previously served as deputy chief of space operations for operations and the first commander of United States Space Forces – Space and combined joint force space component commander of the United States Space Command.

Schiess entered the United States Air Force in 1992 after graduating from the California State Polytechnic University, Pomona. He is a career missile and space operations officer, initially working in ICBM squadrons before transitioning to space launch, GPS and military satellite communication assignments. He has commanded the 4th Space Operations Squadron, the 45th Operations Group, the 21st Space Wing, and the 45th Space Wing in the Air Force. He also deployed to Qatar in support of the war in Afghanistan.

In 2022, Schiess transferred to the Space Force. In 2023, he was promoted to lieutenant general and became the inaugural commander of United States Space Forces – Space. On 3 September 2026, he was promoted to general and became the third chief of space operations, the military head of the Space Force.

== Early life and education ==
Douglas Andrew Schiess was born on 5 February 1970, in Yucaipa, California. He had a great uncle who served in the Army during World War II. His dad served in the United States Air Force at the end of the Vietnam War. In 1988, he graduated from Yucaipa High School.

Schiess entered the Air Force Reserve Officers Training Corps (ROTC) at University of California at Los Angeles as a way to pay for college. He entered the California State Polytechnic University, Pomona. He immersed himself in his detachment, "learned how the military operates, that [he] found out this [was] something [he] really want to be about." In 1992, he graduated with a B.S. degree in physics.

In 1996, Schiess received an M.S. in human resources management from the Central Michigan University. He also received an M.A. in organizational management in 2000 from the George Washington University. In 2004, he completed an M.S. in space systems from the Air Force Institute of Technology. He also earned an M.A. in national security strategy from the National War College in 2012. He also attended Squadron Officer School, Air Command and Staff College by correspondence, and Air War College by correspondence as part of his professional military education.

Schiess also attend several courses and seminars from the Advanced Space Operations School, Alan L. Freed Associates, UNC Kenan–Flagler Business School, National Defense University, Harvard Kennedy School, Air University, and Army War College.

== Military career ==
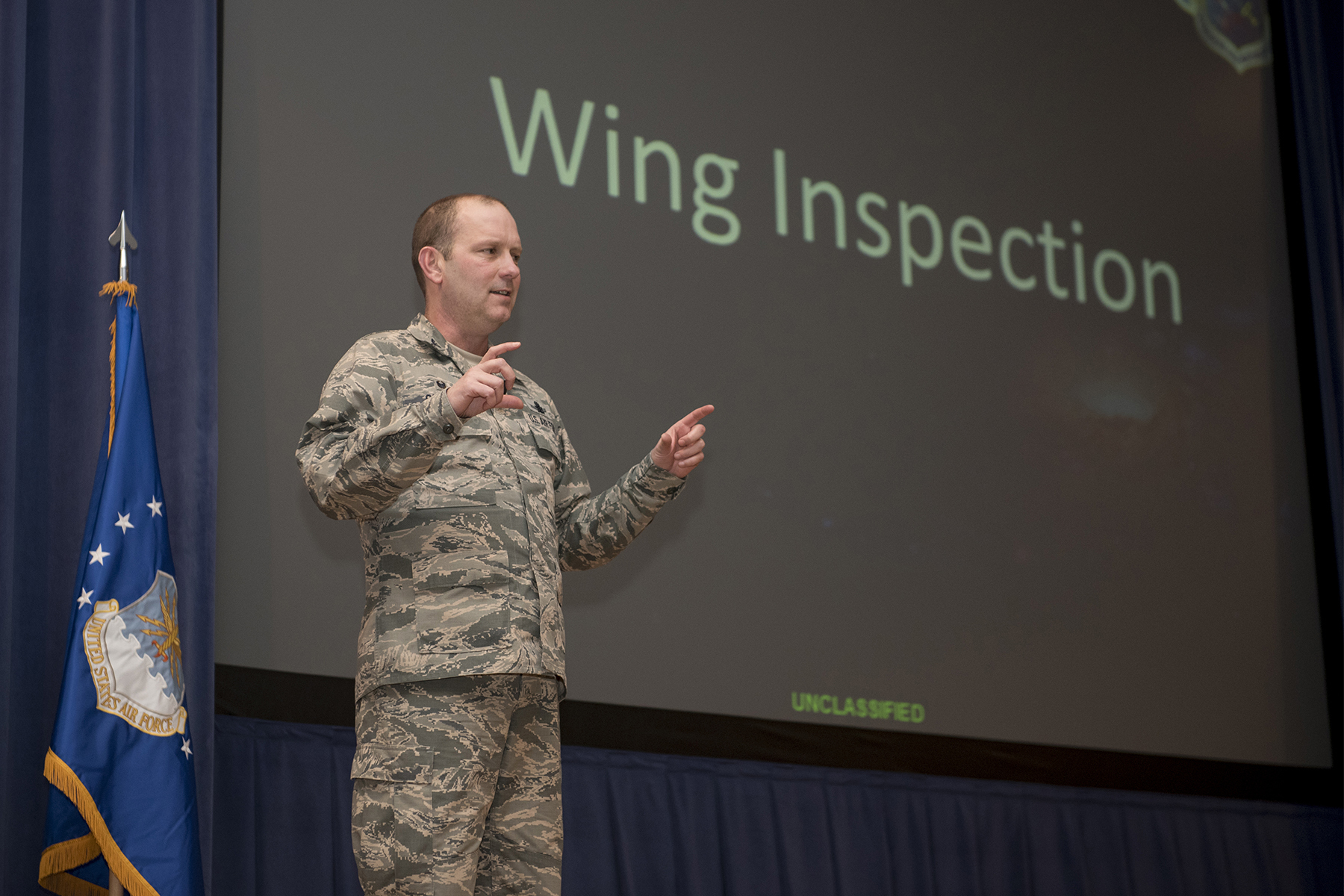
Schiess holding an all call as 21st Space Wing commander in 2016

Schiess was commissioned into the United States Air Force on 27 June 1992. From January to April 2023, he underwent undergraduate missile training at Vandenberg Air Force Base, California. After completing his initial training, he was assigned to the 446th Missile Squadron at Grand Forks Air Force Base, North Dakota, from 1993 to 1995 as an Intercontinental Ballistic Missile (ICBM) crew commander, deputy flight commander, instructor, and ICBM deputy crew commander. From 1995 to 1997, he served as senior evaluator and ICBM crew commander evaluator for the 321st Missile Group's Standardization and Evaluation Division.

From 1997 to 1998, Schiess went back to Vandenberg to serve as chief of training, launch crew commander, and launch controller for the 2nd Space Launch Squadron. He was then assigned to the Pentagon from 1998 to 2000 as an Air Force intern. He was assigned at the Personnel Force Management Directorate of the Office of the Air Force Deputy Chief of Staff for Personnel and the Office of the Secretary of Defense (Nuclear, Chemical and Biological Programs).

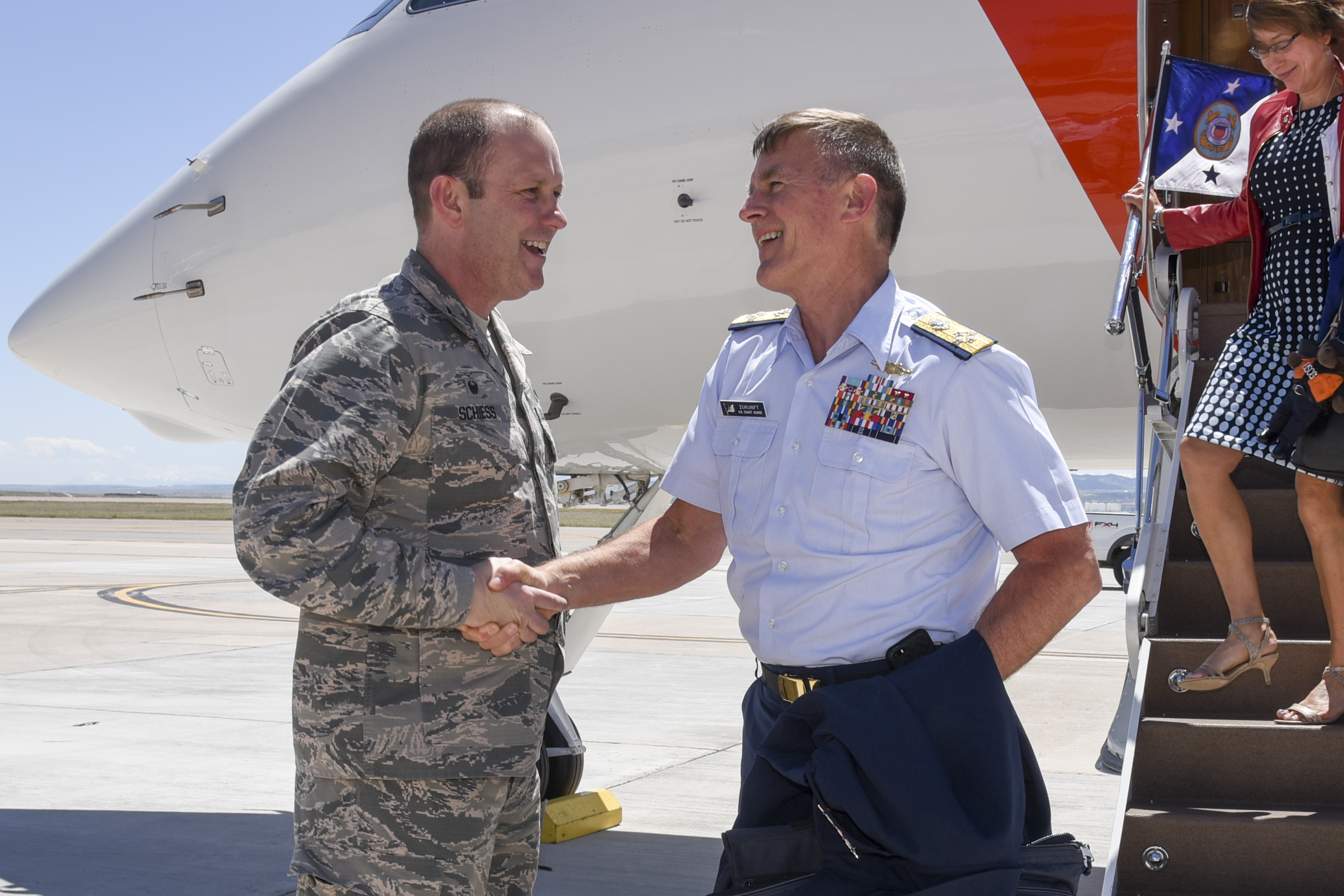
Schiess greets Admiral Zukunft after arriving at Peterson Air Force Base, 2016

After his Pentagon tour, Schiess was reassigned to Schriever Air Force Base in Colorado. From 2000 to 2001, he served with the 2nd Space Operations Squadron (2 SOPS) as a Global Positioning System (GPS) crew commander and satellite vehicle operator. He then served as executive officer to the wing commander at the 50th Space Wing for a year after that. From 2002 to 2003, he was reassigned to the Air Force Space Command at Peterson Air Force Base, Colorado, as the command lead for space professional development with the vice commander's action group.

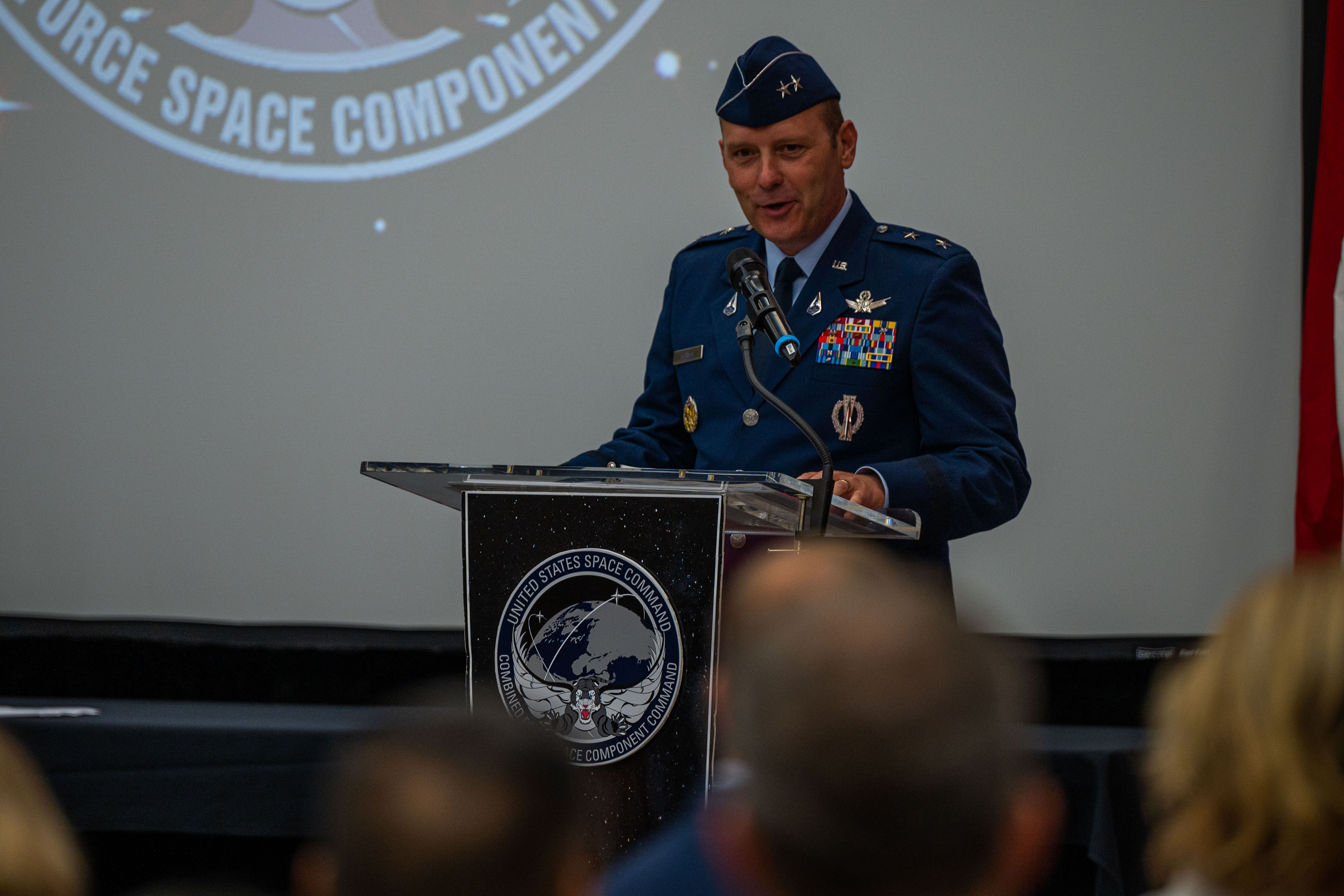
Schiess speaks after assuming command of the Combined Force Space Component Command in August 2022

In 2004, after a year of studying at the Air Force Institute of Technology at Wright-Patterson Air Force Base, Ohio, Schiess was reassigned again at the Pentagon for three years. His first assignment there was as chief of the Military Satellite Communications Operations Branch at the Space Operations Division, Directorate of Strategic Security of the Office of the Deputy Chief of Staff for Air and Space Operations. From 2005 to 2007, he was assigned at the Office of the Secretary of the Air Force's Legislative Liaison as chief of space and missile programs at the Weapons Systems Division.

From 2007 to 2011, Schiess was stationed at Schriever. First, he was reassigned again with 2 SOPS, now as the squadron's operations officer. After that, he served as commander of the 4th Space Operations Squadron from 2009 to 2011, in charge of military communication satellites. For a year after that, he studied at the National War College in Washington, D.C.

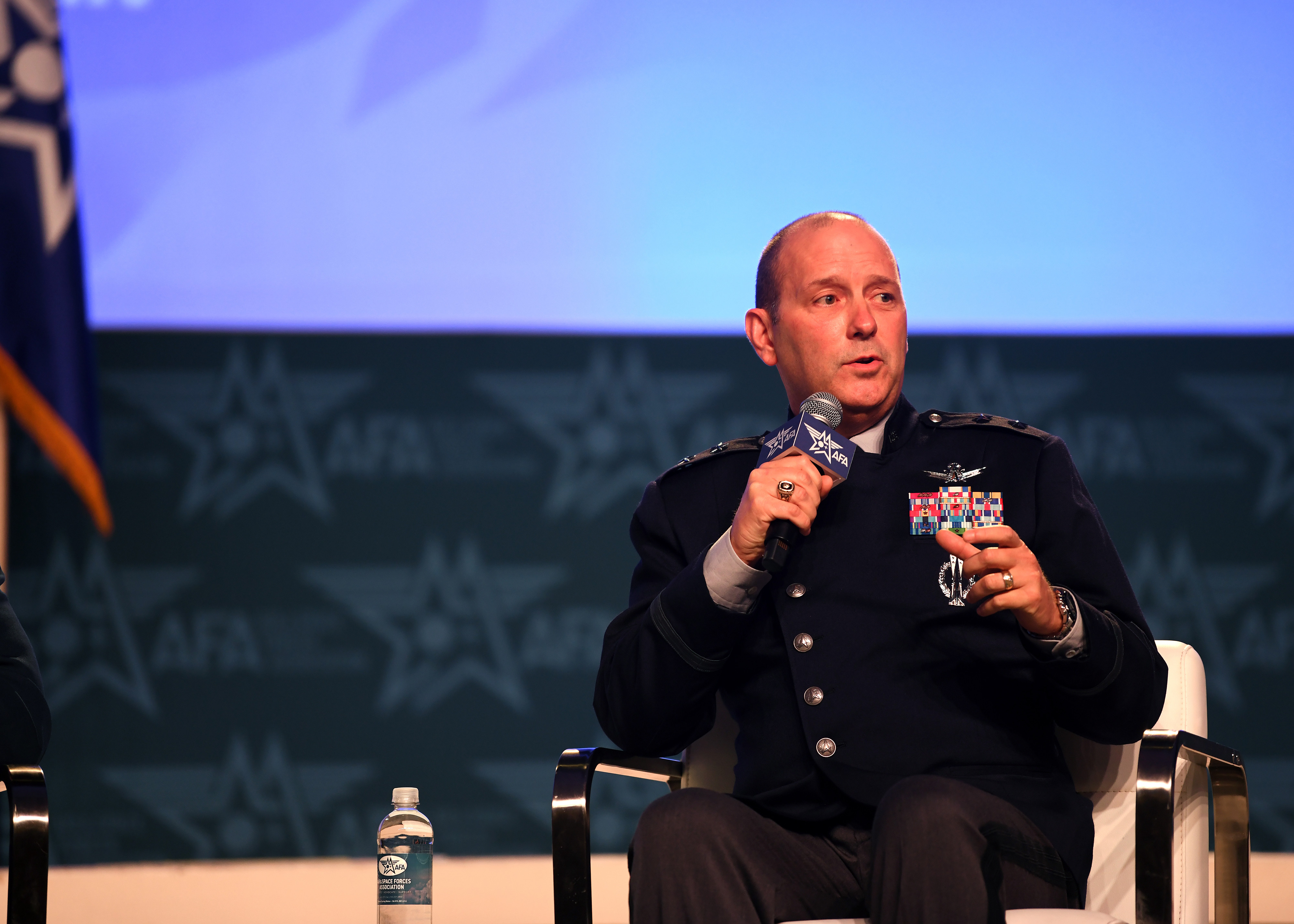
Schiess speaks at Air & Space Forces Association's Air Space and Cyber Conference, 2023

Schiess was then assigned to Cape Canaveral Air Force Station, Florida, to serve as commander of the 45th Operations Group from 2012 to 2014. After that, he was deployed to Al Udeid Air Base in Qatar as the director of space forces of the U.S. Air Forces Central Command in support of the war in Afghanistan. From 2015 to 2017, he had another commander tour at Peterson Air Force Base, Colorado, with the 21st Space Wing.

From 2017 to 2018, Schiess served as senior military assistant to the under secretary of the Air Force at the Pentagon, Matthew Donovan. After that assignment, he was promoted to brigadier general. On 23 August 2018, he took command of the 45th Space Wing from Brigadier General Wayne Monteith, in charge of the Eastern Range and space launch operations from the East Coast. In December 2020, he relinquished command of the 45th Space Wing to Brigadier General Stephen G. Purdy and moved to Peterson Air Force Base, Colorado, as deputy commanding general for operations of the newly established Space Operations Command (SpOC).

In July 2021, Schiess was nominated for transfer to the United States Space Force and promotion to major general. Confirmed on 28 April 2022, he transferred from the Air Force to the Space Force on the same day. He was also promoted to major general, but his official promotion date was backdated to 7 May 2021.

In August 2022, Schiess moved back to Vandenberg Air Force Base, California, to take command of the Combined Force Space Component Command (CFSCC) from Major General DeAnna Burt. In addition to his role as CFSCC commander, he also served as vice commander of SpOC.

In October 2023, Schiess was nominated for promotion to lieutenant general and assignment as commander of the United States Space Forces – Space (S4S) and combined joint force space component commander for the United States Space Command. On 6 December 2023, after his confirmation to his new rank and position, CFSCC was inactivated. He was promoted to lieutenant general and became the inaugural commander of S4S.

On 7 August 2026, Schiess was confirmed by the U.S. Senate as the third Chief of Space Operations and replaced Gen. B. Chance Saltzman on September 3, 2026.

== Personal life ==
Schiess is married to Debbie Schiess, whom he met in 5th grade and they started dating in high school. They married halfway through college.

== Awards and decorations ==
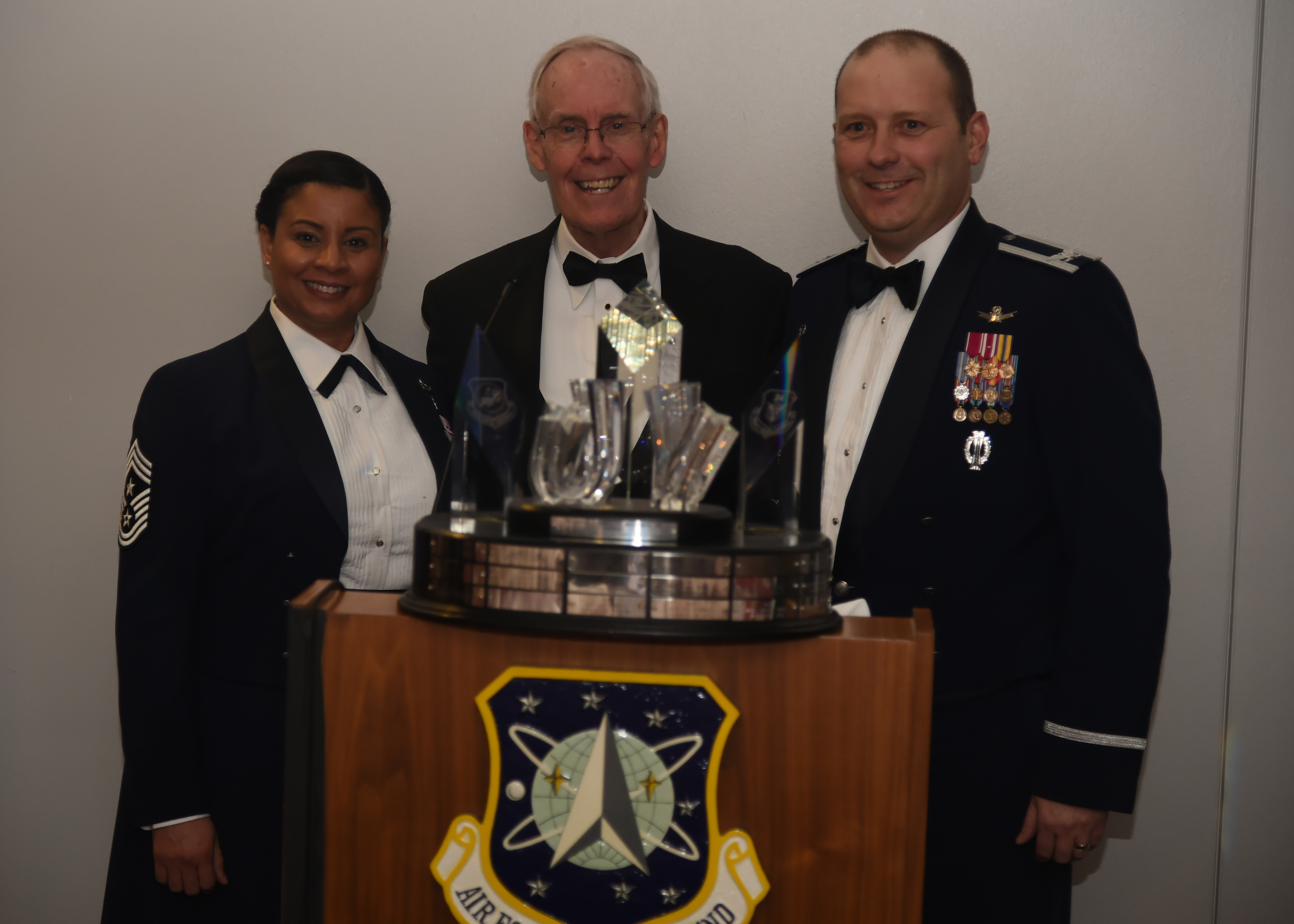
Gen Moorman (center) presents the 2015 Thomas S. Moorman Jr. Award to Col Schiess (right) and Chief Peele (left) on behalf of the 21st Space Wing

Schiess is the recipient of the following awards:

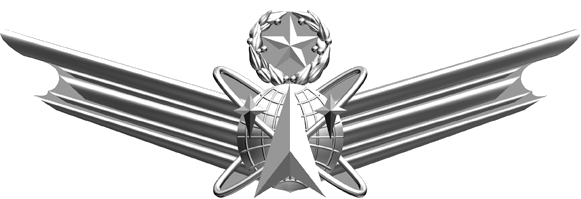
Command Space Operations Badge

Basic Missile Operations Badge

Office of the Joint Chiefs of Staff Identification Badge

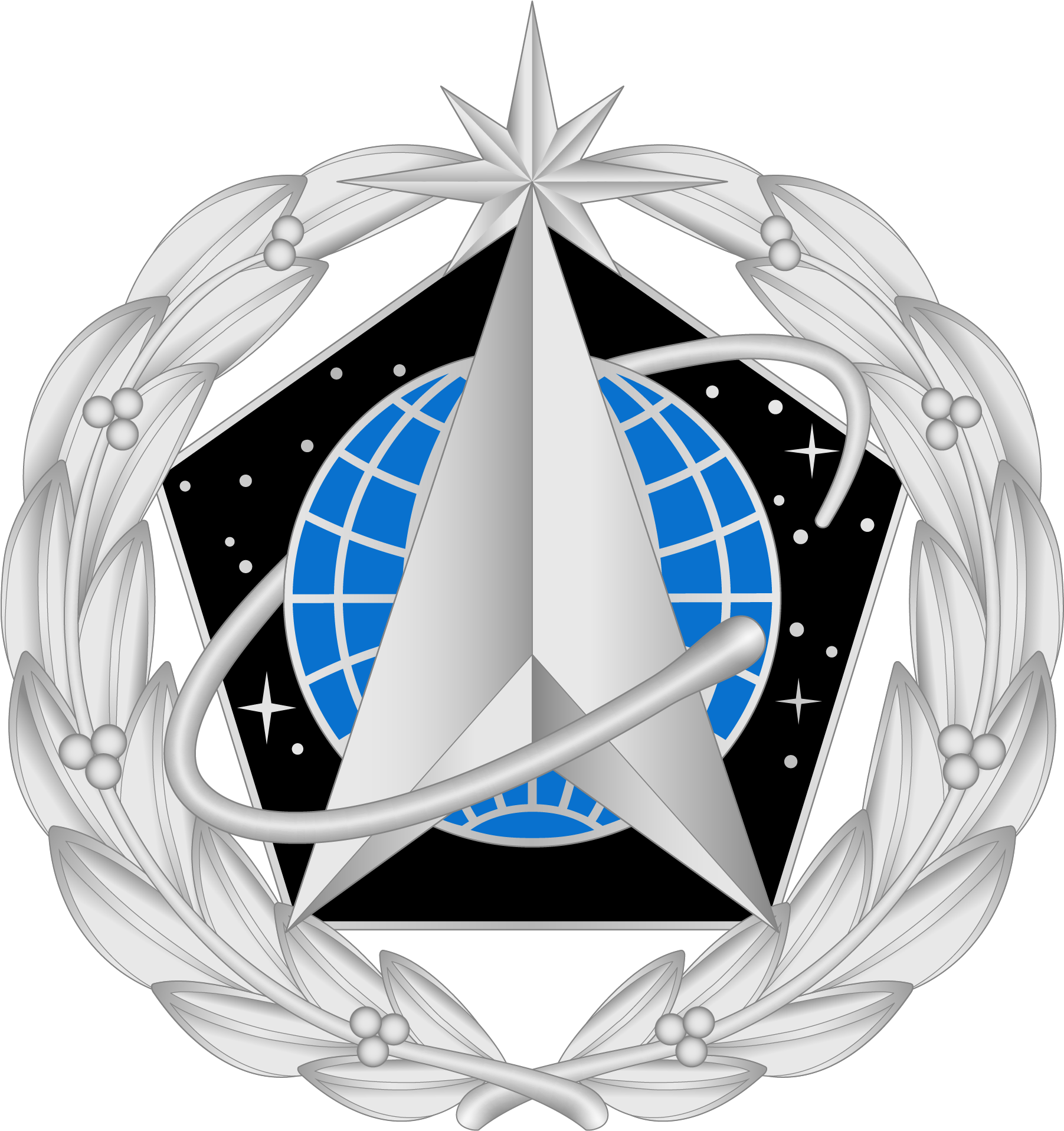

Space Staff Badge

Air Staff Badge

| Air Force Distinguished Service Medal with one bronze oak leaf cluster |
| Legion of Merit with three bronze oak leaf clusters |
| Meritorious Service Medal with one silver oak leaf cluster |
| Air Force Commendation Medal |
| Air Force Achievement Medal |
| Joint Meritorious Unit Award |
| Air Force Outstanding Unit Award with two silver oak leaf clusters |
| Air Force Organizational Excellence Award with two bronze oak leaf clusters |
| Combat Readiness Medal with one bronze oak leaf cluster |
| Air Force Recognition Ribbon |
| National Defense Service Medal with one bronze service star |
| Global War on Terrorism Expeditionary Medal |
| Global War on Terrorism Service Medal |
| Humanitarian Service Medal |
| Remote Combat Effects Campaign Medal |
| Air and Space Campaign Medal |
| Nuclear Deterrence Operations Service Medal with "N" device |
| Air Force Overseas Short Tour Service Ribbon |
| Air Force Expeditionary Service Ribbon with gold frame |
| Air Force Longevity Service Award with one silver and one bronze oak leaf cluster |
| Air Force Small Arms Expert Marksmanship Ribbon with one bronze service star |
| Air Force Training Ribbon |

- 1992 Distinguished Graduate, Reserve Officer Training Corps
- 1993 Distinguished Graduate, Undergraduate Missile Training
- 1997 Outstanding Contributor, Squadron Officer School
- 2000 Distinguished Graduate, GPS Initial Qualification Training
- 2007 John J. Welch Air Force Award for Excellence in Acquisition Leadership
- 2009 Academic Achievement Award, Milstar Initial Qualification Training
- 2017 Air Force Space Command General and Mrs. Jerome F. O'Malley Award
- 2023 Statecraft Fellow, The Mentor Group

== Dates of promotion ==
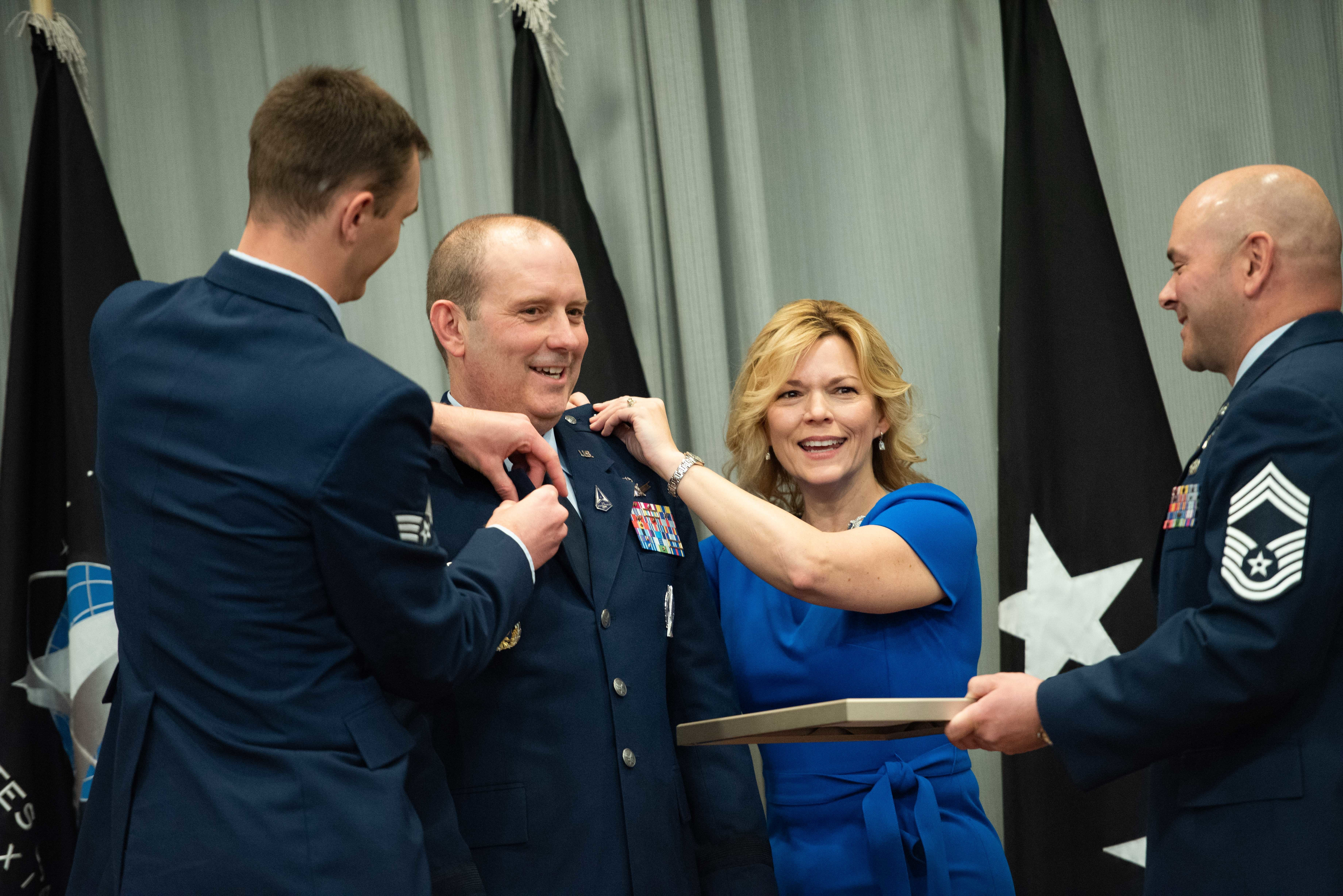
Schiess receives his second star during a promotion ceremony, 2022

| Rank | Branch | Date |
|---|---|---|
| Second Lieutenant | Air Force | 27 June 1992 |
| First Lieutenant | Air Force | 30 September 1994 |
| Captain | Air Force | 30 September 1996 |
| Major | Air Force | 1 April 2003 |
| Lieutenant Colonel | Air Force | 1 September 2007 |
| Colonel | Air Force | 1 June 2012 |
| Brigadier General | Air Force | 3 August 2018 |
| Major General | Air Force | 7 May 2021 |
| Major General | Space Force | 28 April 2022 |
| Lieutenant General | Space Force | 6 December 2023 |
| General | Space Force | 3 September 2026 |

Military offices
| Preceded by Tommy A. Roberts | Commander of the 4th Space Operations Squadron; 2009–2011 | Succeeded by Scott Trinrud |
| Preceded by Denette Sleeth | Commander of the 45th Operations Group; 2012–2014 | Succeeded by Tom Falzarano |
| Preceded by John E. Shaw | Commander of the 21st Space Wing; 2015–2017 | Succeeded by Todd Moore |
| Preceded by Wayne Monteith | Commander of the 45th Space Wing; 2018–2020 | Succeeded by Stephen G. Purdy |
| Preceded by DeAnna Burt | Director of Operations and Communications of Space Operations Command; 2020–2022 | Succeeded by Devin Pepper |
| Preceded by DeAnna Burt | Commander of the Combined Force Space Component Command and Vice Commander of Space Operations Command; 2022–2023 | Succeeded by Devin Pepper and CFSCC Inactivated |
| New unit | Commander of United States Space Forces – Space and Combined Joint Force Space Component Commander of the United States Space Command; 2023–2025 | Succeeded by Dennis Bythewood |
| Preceded by DeAnna Burt | Deputy Chief of Space Operations for Operations; 2025–2026 | Succeeded by Vacant |
| Preceded by B. Chance Saltzman | Chief of Space Operations; 2026–present | Incumbent |
