= Joint Navigation Warfare Center =

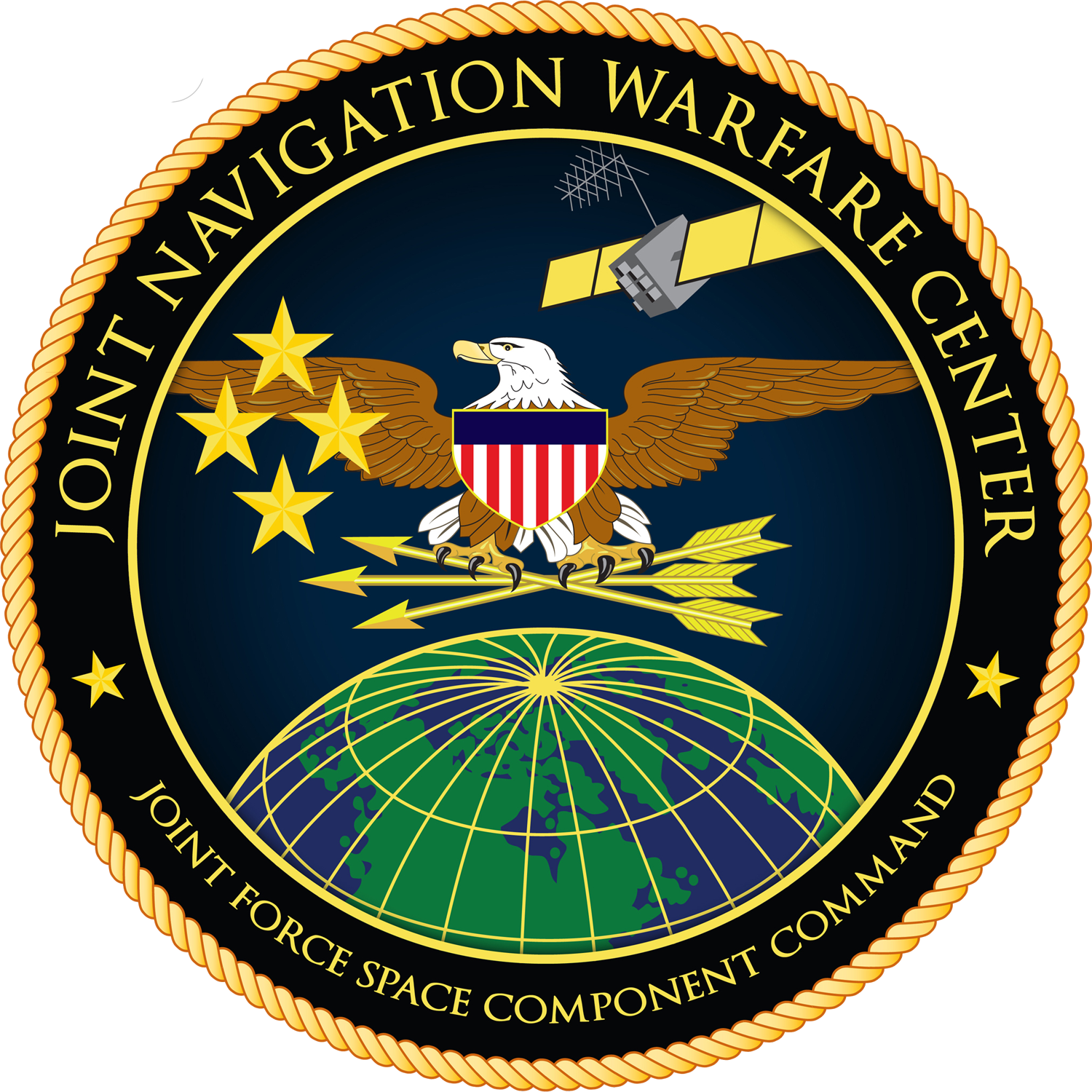
- Seal of the Joint Navigation Warfare Center
- Founded: 1 October 2004; 20 years, 8 months
- Country: United States
- Type: Space warfare center
- Role: Navigation warfare
- Part of: Combined Force Space Component Command
- Headquarters: Kirtland Air Force Base, New Mexico, United States of America

The Joint Navigation Warfare Center (JNWC) is a subordinate center of United States Space Command's Combined Force Space Component Command. It is responsible for planning and coordinating navigation warfare operations. The JNWC is located at Kirtland Air Force Base.

== Mission ==
The Joint Navigation Warfare Center plans, tasks, integrates, provides C2, and supports integrated Navigation Warfare (NAVWAR) worldwide.

Navigation warfare means the use of the "Air Force Global Positioning System satellite navigation system by the Department of Defense and its allies, and attempts to disrupt the system by adversaries."

Command and control is conducted day-to-day, through reachback capabilities and deployable subject-matter experts, in support of combatant commanders (CCDRs). Assistance is provided via the JNWC NAVWAR support cell, coordination cells, and deployable theater coordination cells. CCDR requests for NAVWAR capabilities are supported by United States Space Command components after decondition and prioritization of ongoing missions.

== History ==
Established on 1 October 2004, the Joint Navigation Warfare Center was initially under the office of the Assistant Secretary of Defense for Networks and Information Integration, but in October 2007 was moved under the Joint Functional Component Command for Space, which evolved into United States Space Command.
