= Joint Overhead Persistent Infrared Center =

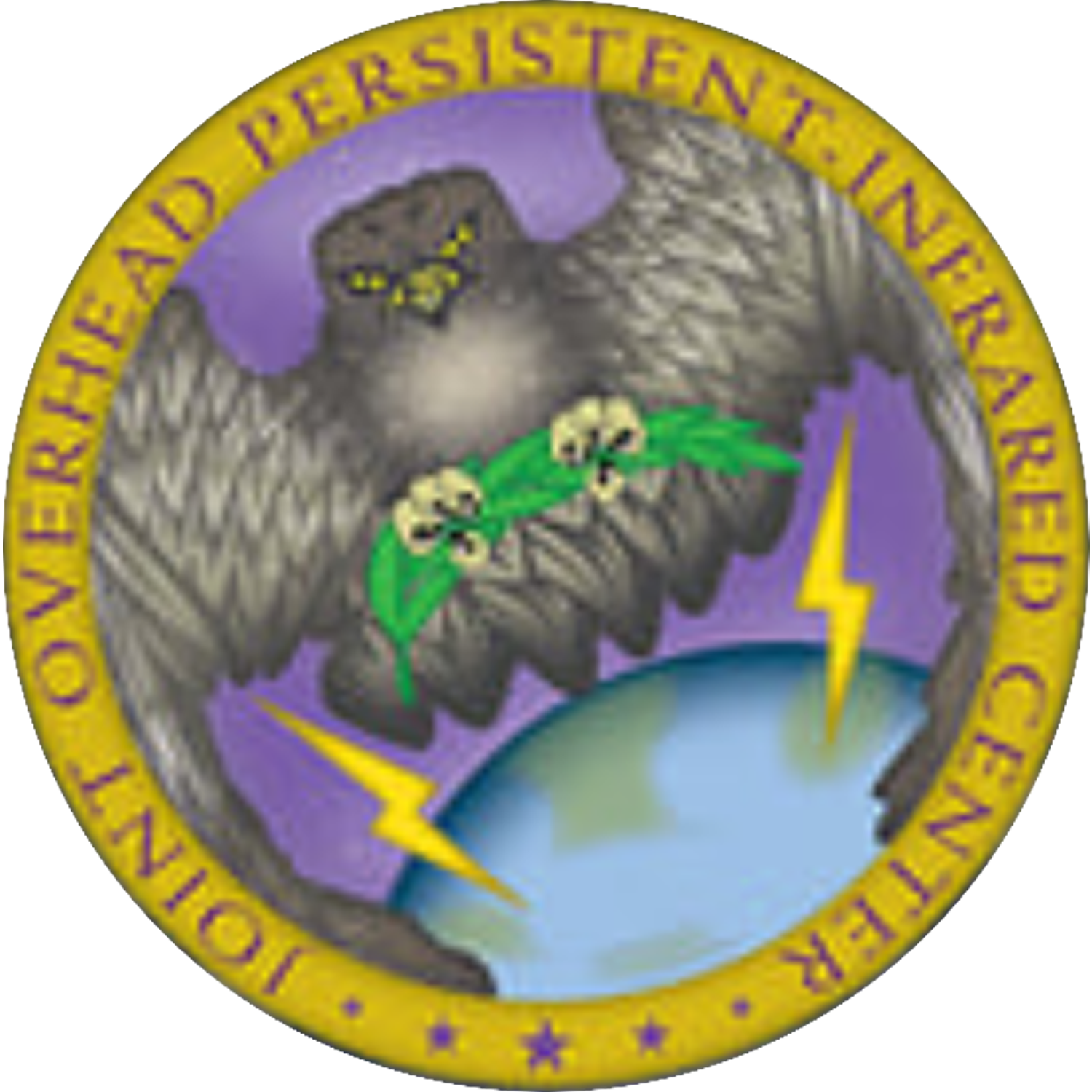
- Seal of the Joint Overhead Persistent Infrared Center
- Founded: unknown-present
- Country: United States
- Type: Space warfare center
- Role: Overhead persistent infrared operations
- Part of: Combined Force Space Component Command
- Headquarters: Buckley Space Force Base, Colorado, U.S.

The Joint Overhead Persistent Infrared Center (JOPC) is a subordinate center of United States Space Command's Combined Force Space Component Command. It is responsible for planning and coordinating overhead persistent infra-red operations. The JOPC is located at Buckley Space Force Base.

== Mission ==
The Joint Overhead Persistent Infrared Center is a joint endeavor between United States Space Command and the National Geospatial-Intelligence Agency. The JOPC develops integrated OPIR collection and exploitation strategies and plans for OPIR sensors (both Intelligence Community, inc. National Reconnaissance Office and Department of Defense sensors, such as the Space-Based Infrared System (SBIRS). These plans and strategies support missile warning, missile defense, awareness of the operating environment, technical intelligence, and civil/environmental mission areas.
