= Stephen Whiting =

U.S. Space Force general officer

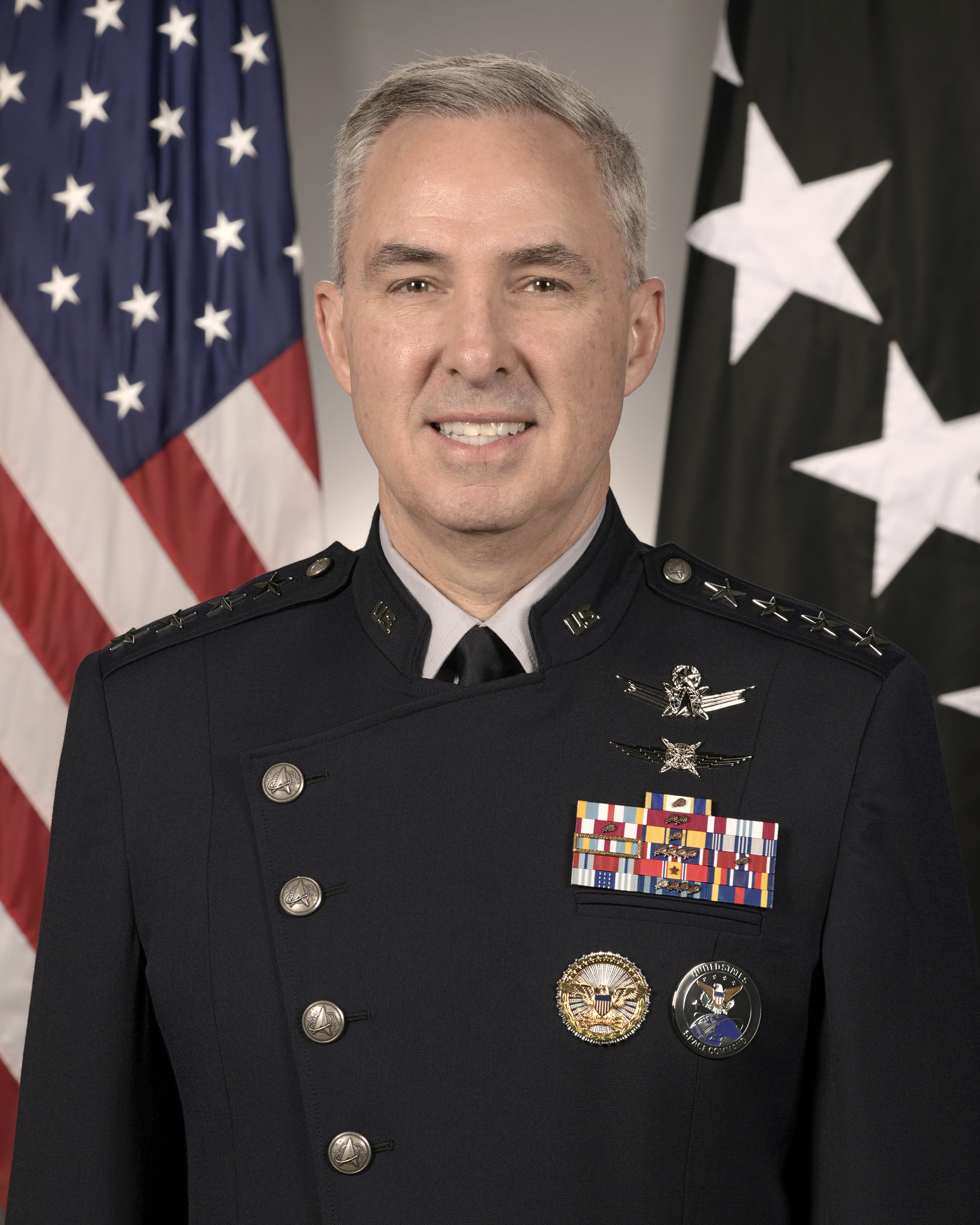
- Official portrait, 2024
- Born: Stephen Newman Whiting; September 14, 1967 (age 59); Ocean Springs, Mississippi, U.S.
- Alma mater: United States Air Force Academy (BS); George Washington University (MA); Air University (MMAS, MS)
- Military career
- Allegiance: United States
- Branch: United States Air Force (1989–2020); United States Space Force (2020–present)
- Service years: 1989–present
- Rank: General
- Commands: United States Space Command; Space Operations Command; Combined Force Space Component Command; Fourteenth Air Force; 21st Space Wing; 614th Air Operations Center; 13th Space Warning Squadron
- Awards: Air Force Distinguished Service Medal (3); Defense Superior Service Medal; Legion of Merit (3)
- Whiting's voice Whiting testifying at the Senate Armed Services Committee on the state of U.S. Space Command. Recorded 29 February 2024

Signature
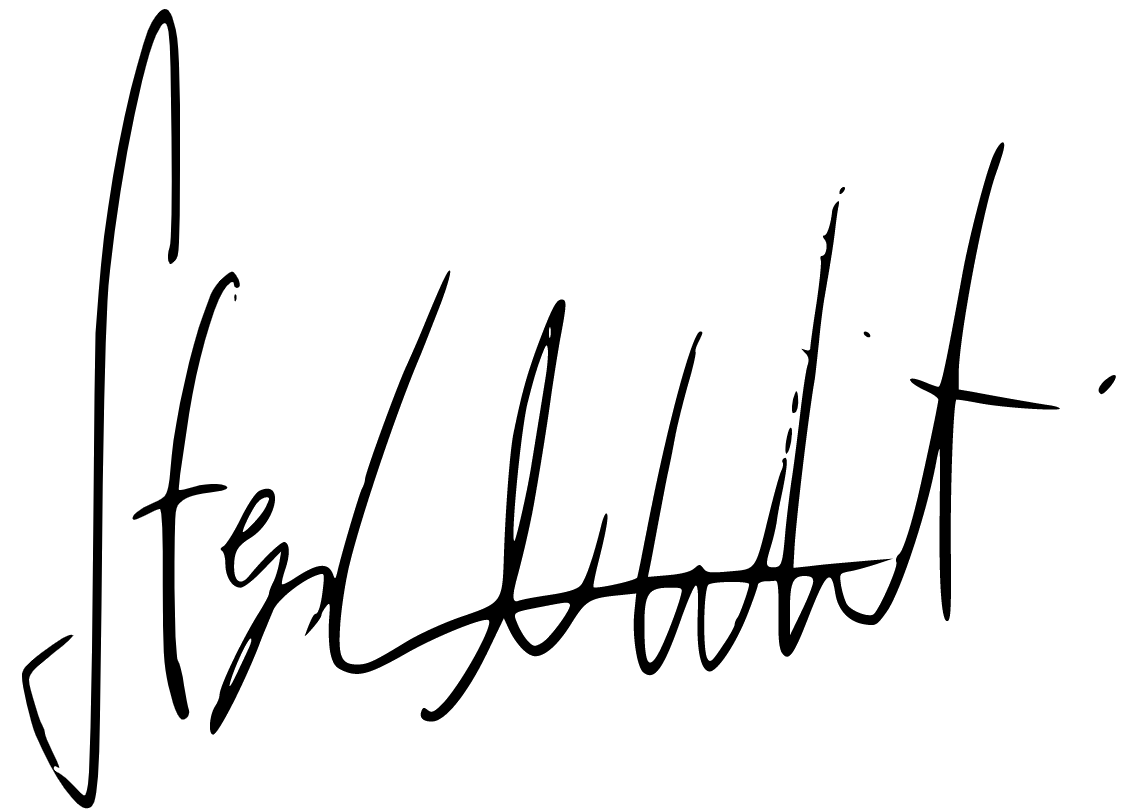

Stephen Newman Whiting (born 14 September 1967) is a United States Space Force general who serves as the commander of the United States Space Command. He previously served as the first commander of Space Operations Command from 2020 to 2024.

Whiting entered the United States Air Force in 1989 as a distinguished graduate of the United States Air Force Academy. He is a space operations officer, commanding the 13th Space Warning Squadron, the 614th Air and Space Operations Center and Joint Space Operations Center, the 21st Space Wing, and the Combined Force Space Component Command and Fourteenth Air Force. He has also served staff assignments at the Air Force headquarters, United States Space Command, United States Strategic Command, the Chief of Naval Operations’ Strategic Studies Group, the Office of the Deputy Secretary of Defense, and the Air Force Space Command. Whiting transferred to the Space Force in 2020.

Whiting transferred to the Space Force in 2020 and became the first commander of Space Operations Command. In 2024, he was promoted to general and took command of the U.S. Space Command.

== Early life and education ==
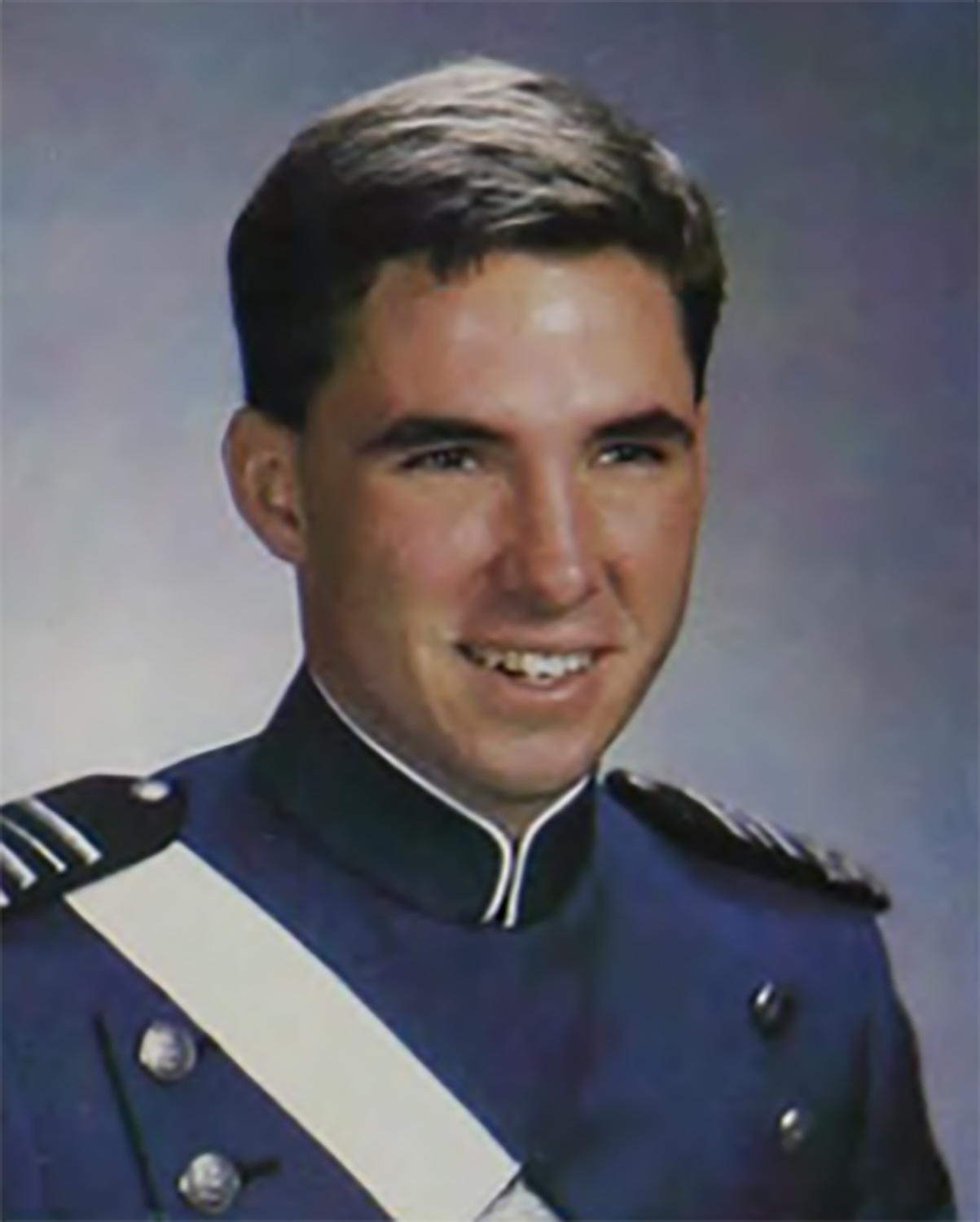
Whiting as a cadet at USAFA, 1989

Whiting was born on 14 September 1967, in Ocean Springs, Mississippi. He studied at Ocean Springs High School, where he was a class officer and member of the soccer team that won four state championships.

In 1989, Whiting received a B.A. degree in aeronautical engineering from the United States Air Force Academy as a distinguished graduate. He then received an M.A. in administrative sciences (organizational management) in 1997 from the George Washington University. He also has M.A. degrees in military operational arts and sciences from the Air Command and Staff College and airpower strategy from the School of Advanced Air and Space Studies, both at Air University. He has also attended the Senior Executives in National and International Security program of the Harvard Kennedy School in 2017. He has also studied in the Squadron Officer School and Joint Forces Staff College as part of his professional military education.

== Military career ==
=== Air Force ===
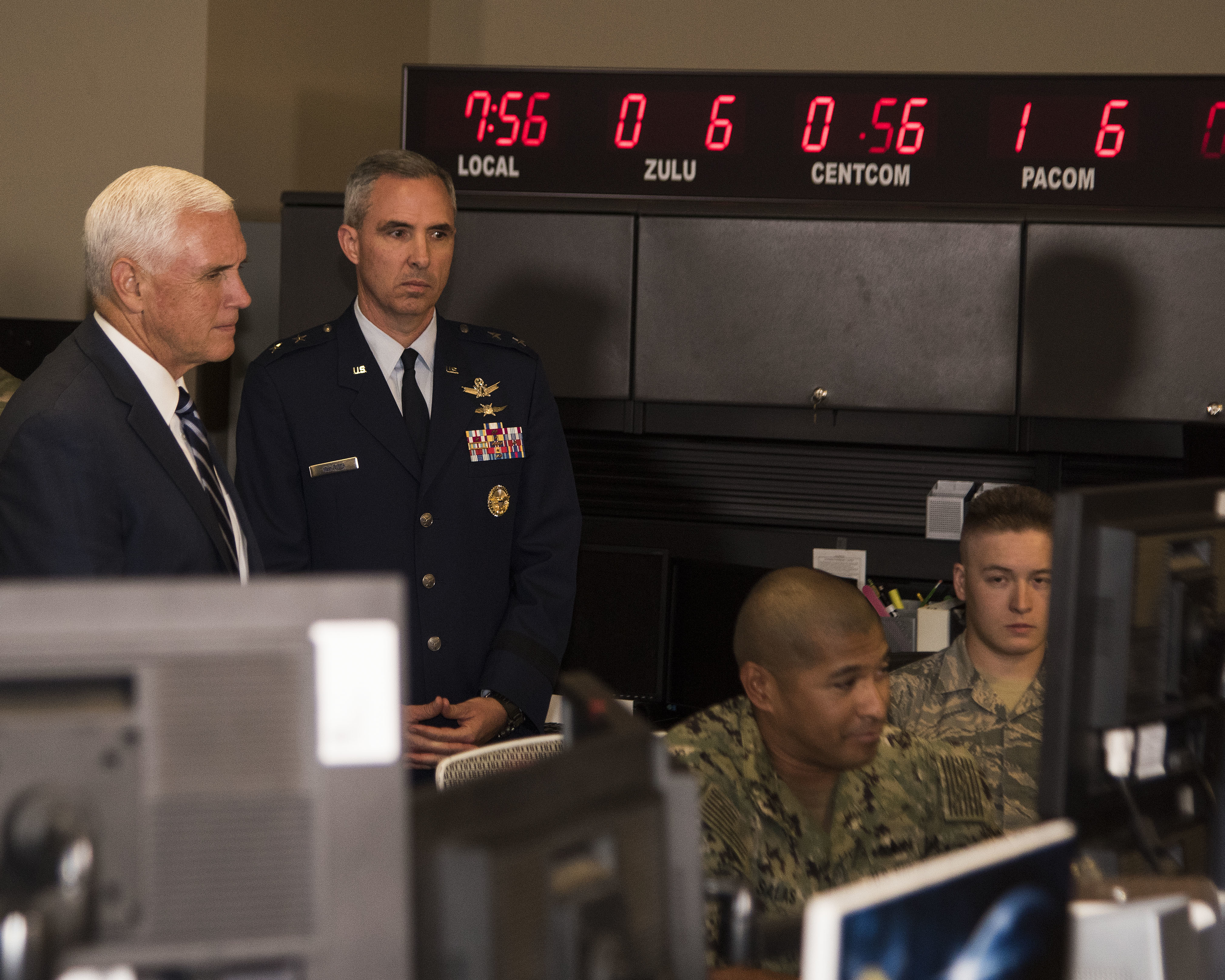
Whiting touring Vice President Mike Pence to the Combined Space Operations Center, July 2019

Whiting was commissioned into the United States Air Force as a second lieutenant on 31 May 1989, as a distinguished graduate from the United States Air Force Academy. First assigned to UPT Columbus AFB MS. (14th Flying training squadron), failed out in Nov 89. He was then reassigned to Lowry AFB CO. A year later, he finished undergraduate space training at Lowry Air Force Base, Colorado, as the top graduate and distinguished graduate. From 1990 to 1993, he served on his first operational assignment at the 6th Space Warning Squadron at Cape Cod Air Force Station in Massachusetts as a crew commander, deputy chief of training, and chief of standardization and evaluation.

As a captain, Whiting served as a radar systems officer at the 21st Operations Support Squadron in Peterson Air Force Base, Colorado from 1993 to 1994. After that, he served a year as the executive officer for the 21st Operations Group. In 1995, he was reassigned to Washington, D.C. as an Air Force intern while he studied at the George Washington University. From 1997 to 1999, he was stationed at Schriever Air Force Base, Colorado as UHF Follow-On satellite satellite vehicle operator, crew commander, and operations flight commander for the 3rd Space Operations Squadron.

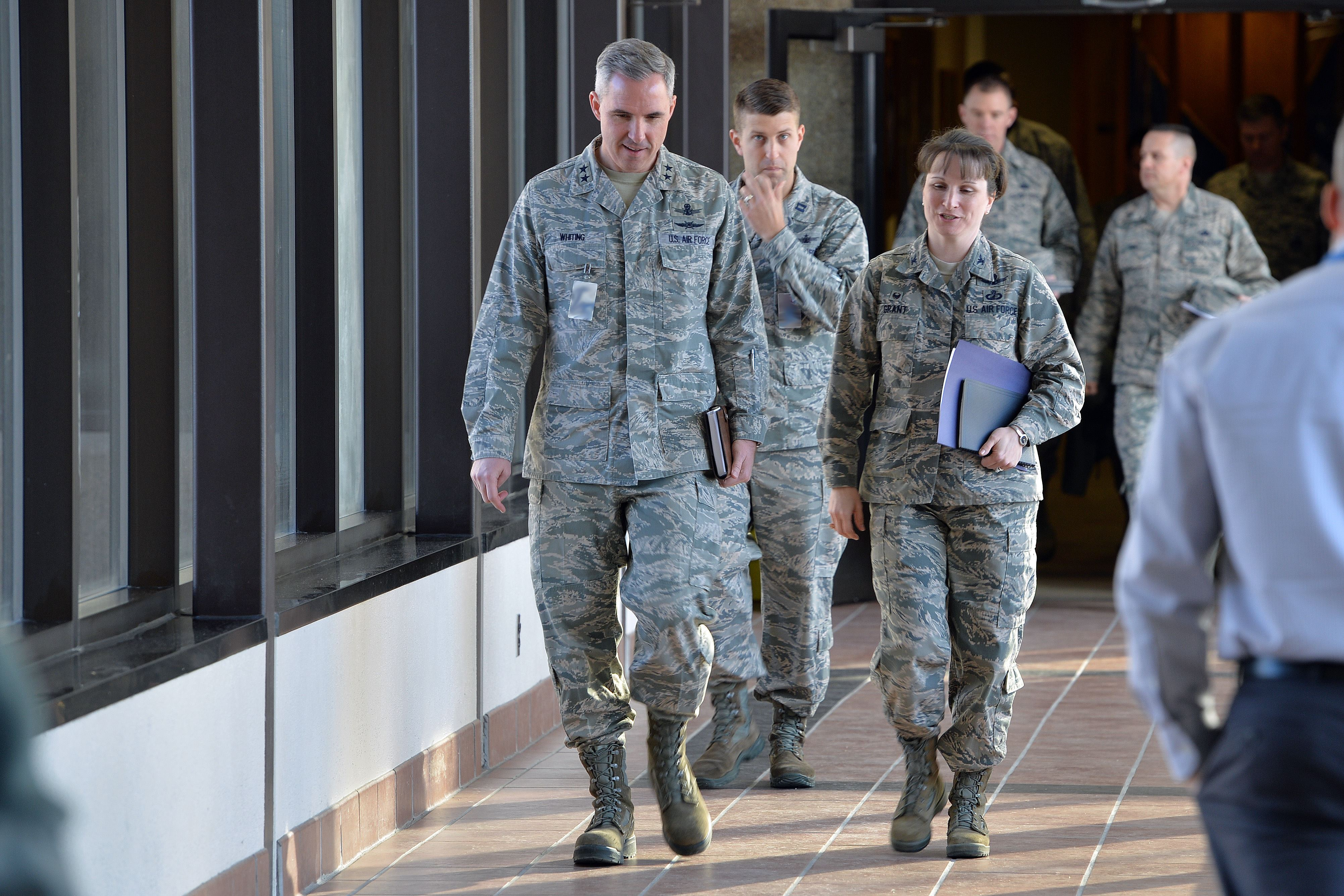
Whiting talks to Col Grant during a tour at Schriever Air Force Base

Whiting was promoted to major on 1 July 1999. At this time, he was working as an operations officer for the 22nd Space Operations Squadron at Schriever Air Force Base. From 2000 to 2002, he studied at the Air Command and Staff College and School of Advanced Air and Space Studies at Maxwell Air Force Base, Alabama. After studying, he was assigned as a regional policy officer at the United States Space Command, during which time the combatant command was disestablished, thereby he continuing this role at United States Strategic Command West. After that assignment, he was selected to serve as special assistant to the commander of U.S. Strategic Command, Admiral James O. Ellis, for a year.

In July 2004, Whiting took command of the 13th Space Warning Squadron at Clear Air Force Station, Alaska. He relinquished command a year later when he was selected as an Air Force fellow at the RAND Corporation. From June 2006 to June 2008, he served as commander of the 614th Air and Space Operations Center and director of the Joint Space Operations Center at Vandenberg Air Force Base, California. After his second command tour, he was selected as a Chief of Staff U.S. Air Force Fellow assigned at the Chief of Naval Operations' Strategic Studies Group in Newport, Rhode Island.

From August 2009 to June 2011, Whiting served as commander of the 21st Space Wing at Peterson Air Force Base. After that, he served as a military assistant to the Deputy Secretary of Defense Ash Carter, for whom he also served as senior military assistant.

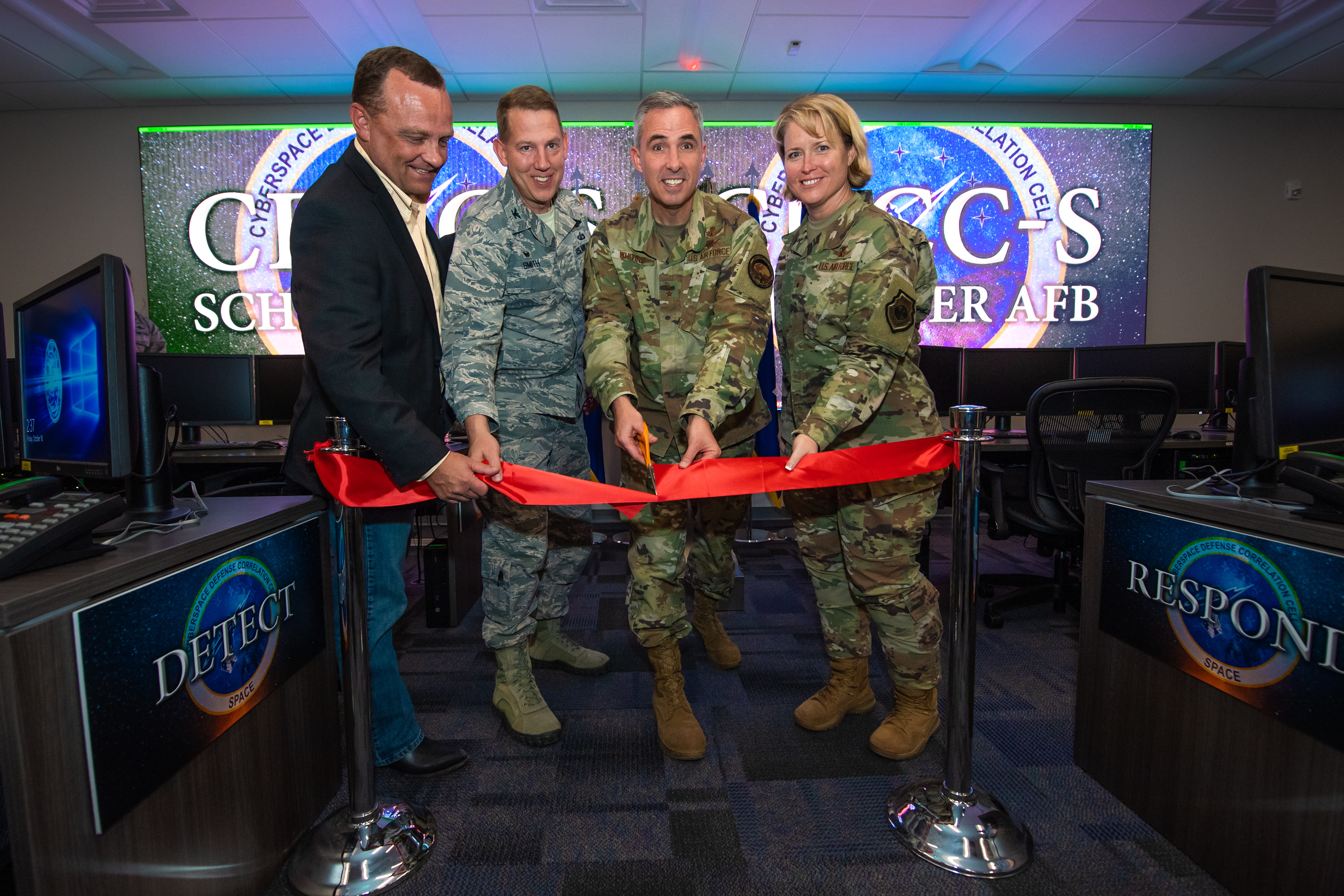
Retired Col Sutton, Col Smith, Maj Gen Whiting, and Brig Gen Burt during the Cyber Defense Correlation Cell-Space ribbon cutting ceremony in October 2019

On 8 July 2013, Whiting was promoted to brigadier general and assigned as vice commander of the Air Force Warfare Center. Two years later, he was selected to lead Air Force Space Command's (AFSPC) Space Enterprise Vision Team. After that, he was assigned as director of integrated air, space, and cyberspace and intelligence, surveillance, and reconnaissance of AFSPC. In 2017, he also served as the lead for the Joint Force Space Component Command (JFSCC) Integration Team.

In December 2017, Whiting took command of the Fourteenth Air Force (14 AF) and became deputy commander of JFSCC. In August 2019, JFSCC was inactivated and the U.S. Space Command was reestablished. Consequently, the Combined Force Space Component Command (CFSCC) was stood up and he took command of the new unit. Three months later, in November 2019, he relinquished command of CFSCC and 14AF to Major General John E. Shaw and became deputy commander of AFSPC.

=== Space Force ===
On 20 December 2019, the United States Space Force was established and AFSPC was temporarily designated as Headquarters, United States Space Force. Whiting thus continued to serve as deputy commander of Headquarters, United States Space Force. In August 2020, he was one of the first general officers nominated to transfer to the Space Force and promoted to general. He was also selected to serve as the first commander of Space Operations Command (SpOC). On 21 October 2020, SpOC was established and Whiting became its first commander.

In July 2023, Whiting was nominated for promotion to general and appointment as commander of the United States Space Command. He was confirmed on 19 December 2023. On 10 January 2024, he took command of the United States Space Command from General James H. Dickinson. In February 2024, he released his strategic vision as commander of the combatant command.

== Personal life ==
Whiting is the son of late Mr. and Mrs. Larry Whiting. His father was a retired Air Force lieutenant colonel. He married Tammy Lynn Preslar on 1 June 1989.

== Awards and decorations ==
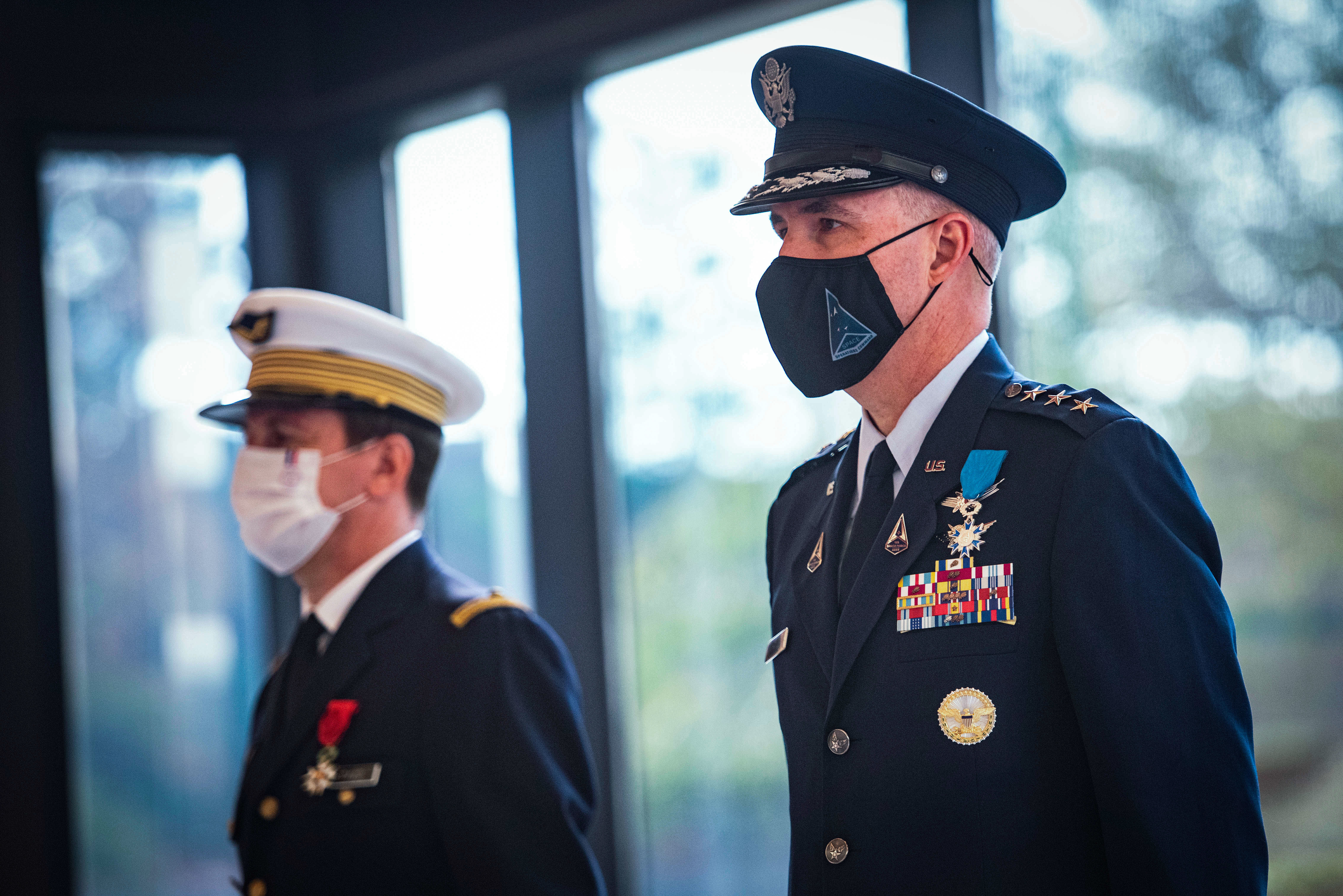
Whiting (right) after receiving the French Ordre national du Mérite, November 2021

Whiting is the recipient of the following awards:

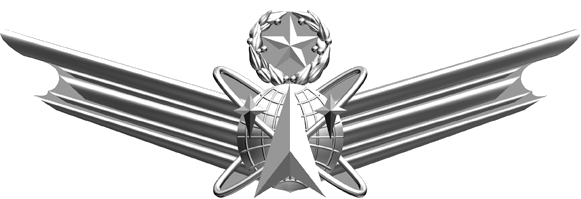
Command Space Operations Badge
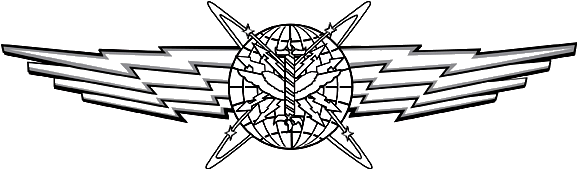
Basic Cyberspace Operator Badge

Office of the Secretary of Defense Badge

United States Space Command Badge

Air Force Distinguished Service Medal with two bronze oak leaf clusters
Defense Superior Service Medal
Legion of Merit with two bronze oak leaf cluster
Defense Meritorious Service Medal
Meritorious Service Medal with one bronze oak leaf cluster
Air Force Commendation Medal with one bronze oak leaf cluster
Air Force Achievement Medal
Joint Meritorious Unit Award
Air Force Outstanding Unit Award with four bronze oak leaf clusters
Air Force Organizational Excellence Award with one bronze oak leaf cluster
Combat Readiness Medal
National Defense Service Medal with one bronze service star
Global War on Terrorism Service Medal
Air Force Overseas Short Tour Service Ribbon
Air Force Longevity Service Award with one silver and three bronze oak leaf clusters
Air Force Training Ribbon
French National Order of Merit (Knight)

== Dates of promotion ==
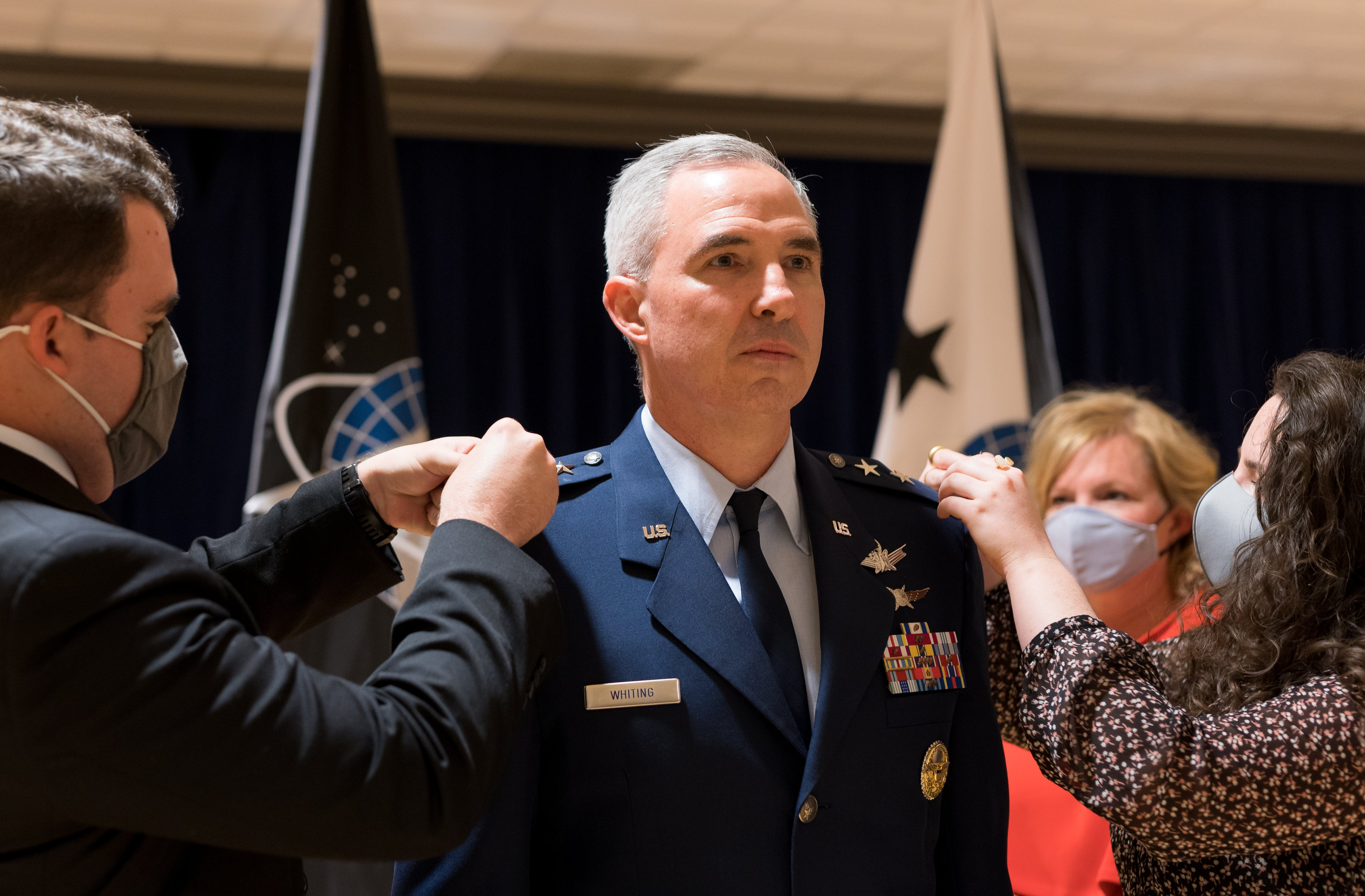
Whiting getting his third star prior to taking command of Space Operations Command, October 2020

Rank	Branch	Date
Second Lieutenant	Air Force	31 May 1989
First Lieutenant	Air Force	31 May 1991
Captain	Air Force	31 May 1993
Major	Air Force	1 July 1999
Lieutenant Colonel	Air Force	1 March 2002
Colonel	Air Force	1 March 2006
Brigadier General	Air Force	8 July 2013
Major General	Air Force	2 May 2017
Lieutenant General	Space Force	21 October 2020
General	Space Force	10 January 2024

== Writings ==
- Whiting, Stephen N. (2003). "Space and Diplomacy: A New Tool for Leverage". Astropolitics. 1 (1): 54–77. Bibcode:2003AstPo...1...54W. doi:10.1080/1477-760391832516. S2CID 143339687.
- Policy, Influence, and Diplomacy: Space as a National Power Element (PDF) (M.S.). School of Advanced Air and Space Studies. June 2002. Archived (PDF) from the original on 1 November 2021.

Military offices
Preceded by John W. Raymond	Commander of the 21st Space Wing; 2009–2011	Succeeded by Chris D. Crawford
Preceded by David J. Buck	Commander of the 14th Air Force; 2017–2019	Succeeded by John E. Shaw
New office	Commander of the Combined Force Space Component Command; 2019	Succeeded by John E. Shaw
New office	Commander of Space Operations Command; 2020–2024	Succeeded by David N. Miller
Preceded by James H. Dickinson	Commander of the United States Space Command; 2024–present	Incumbent
U.S. order of precedence (ceremonial)
Preceded by Kevin Lunday as Commandant of the Coast Guard	Order of precedence of the United States as Commander of U.S. Space Command	Succeeded by Gregory Guillot as Commander of U.S. Northern Command
