= National Space Defense Center =

- Seal of the National Space Defense Center
- Founded: 1 October 2015; 10 years, 2 months
- Country: United States
- Role: Space defense
- Part of: Joint Task Force–Space Defense
- Headquarters: Schriever Space Force Base, Colorado, U.S.

Commanders
- Director: Col Stephen G. Lyon
- Deputy Director: Col Matthew P. Bruno
- Senior Enlisted Leader: SMSgt Kion F. Shaw

Insignia
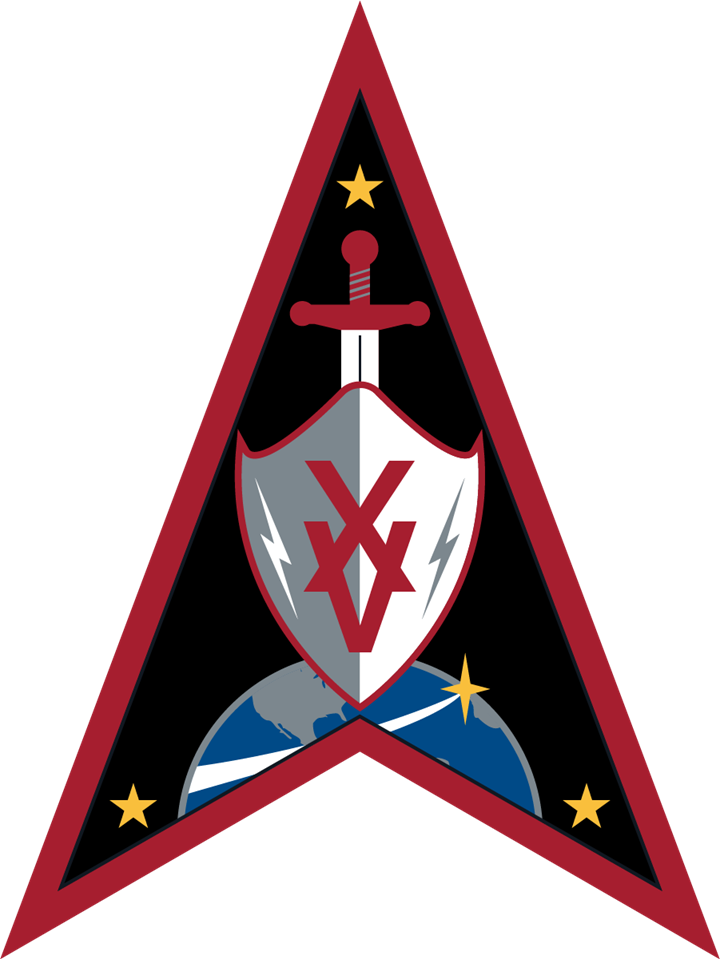
- Space Delta 15

The National Space Defense Center (NSDC) is a subordinate center of United States Space Command's Joint Task Force–Space Defense. It is responsible for coordinating military, intelligence, civil, and commercial space for unified space defense operations. The NSDC is located at Schriever Space Force Base, outside of Colorado Springs.

== Mission ==
The National Space Defense Center integrates Department of Defense, multiple agencies, and Intelligence Community personnel and authorities to enable unified space defense. The National Space Defense Center executes mission orders received from the joint space tasking order (JSTO) and NRO space tasking order.

== History ==
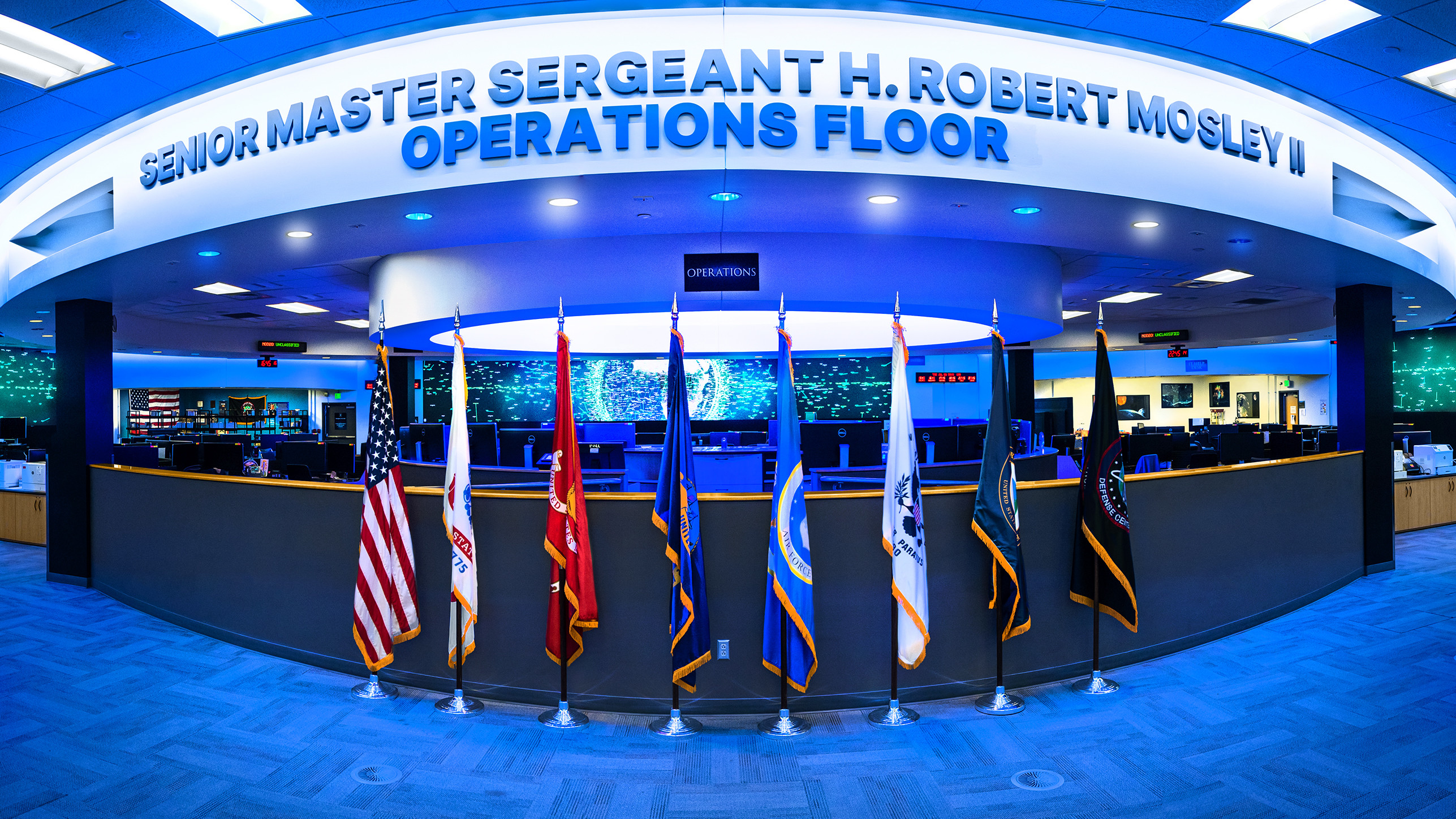
Senior Master Sergeant Robert Mosley Operations Floor

Initially established as the Joint Interagency Combined Space Operations Center (JICSpOC) on 1 October 2015, it was intended to improve processes and procedures, ensuring data fusion among DoD, intelligence community, interagency, allied and commercial space entities.

On 1 April 2017, the JICSpOC was renamed the National Space Defense Center, to better clarify its role and eliminate confusion with the Joint Space Operations Center (JSpOC).

On 9 July 2019, the NSDC dedicated its operations floor and a warfighter library to Senior Master Sergeant Harold Robert Mosley II. Mosley was the NSDC's Senior Enlisted Leader in 2018. He died on 23 November 2018 in a rock climbing accident.

== List of commanders ==
No.	Commander		Term			Ref
No.	Portrait	Name	Took office	Left office	Duration	Ref
1	Todd Brost	Colonel; Todd Brost	1 October 2015	6 September 2018	6 years, 263 days	
2	Mitchell D. Stratton	Colonel; Mitchell D. Stratton	6 September 2018	August 2020	~1 year, 344 days	
3	Scott D. Brodeur	Colonel; Scott D. Brodeur	August 2020	August 2020	~1 year, 330 days	
4	Stephen G. Lyon	Colonel; Stephen G. Lyon	11 July 2022	Incumbent	~3 years, 149 days	

== See also ==
- Combined Space Operations Center
