= Combined Force Space Component Command =

U.S.-led multinational space operations military command (2019-2023)

- Combined Force Space Component Command shield
- Active: 29 August 2019–6 December 2023
- Country: United States; Australia; Canada; United Kingdom
- Branch: United States Space Force
- Type: Subordinate command
- Role: Tactical control of space forces
- Size: 17,000 personnel
- Part of: Combined Joint Task Force–Space Operations
- Headquarters: Vandenberg Space Force Base, California, U.S.

Insignia
- Flag

The Combined Force Space Component Command (CFSCC) was a U.S.-led multinational subordinate command of United States Space Command. It was responsible for tactical control of American and multinational space forces. The CFSCC's mission was to "plan, integrate, conduct, and assess global space operations in order to deliver combat relevant space capabilities to Combatant Commanders, Coalition partners, the Joint Force, and the Nation." It was established on 29 August 2019.

The United States Space Force's Space Operations Command West served as the headquarters and staff for the Combined Force Space Component Command.

CFSCC was inactivated on 6 December 2023 with the activation of United States Space Forces – Space. On 8 January 2024, a ceremony was held to inactivate CFSCC.

== Structure ==
The Combined Force Space Component Command's included four centers:

- Combined Space Operations Center (CSpOC), Vandenberg Space Force Base, California
- Missile Warning Center (MWC), Cheyenne Mountain Space Force Station, Colorado
- Joint Overhead Persistent Infrared Center (JOPC), Buckley Space Force Base, Colorado
- Joint Navigation Warfare Center (JNWC), Kirtland Air Force Base, New Mexico

== History ==
The Combined Force Space Component Command was established immediately after the establishment of United States Space Command on August 29, 2019. In addition to having tactical control of Space Force, Army, Navy, and multinational forces, the CFSCC also plans and executes space operations. The CFSCC both executes space operations and integrates space effects and support within the existing combatant commands. The CFSCC also provides support to, and receives support from, Coalition operations centers including the Australian Space Operations Centre, part of Headquarters Joint Operations Command, Canadian Space Operations Centre, and United Kingdom Space Operations Centre.

In addition the CFSCC commands and controls assigned multinational forces in support of Operation Olympic Defender. Olympic Defender is aimed at "strengthening allies’ abilities to deter hostile actions by rivals." British Defense Minister Penny Mordaunt told delegates to a July 2019 conference that "over the next 18 months.. Britain will send eight personnel" to the CFSCC to help "“strengthen deterrence against hostile actors in space." Olympic Defender, dating to 2013, "coordinate[s] allies’ efforts to protect key satellites."

The CFSCC specifically commands space domain awareness, space electronic warfare, satellite communications, missile warning, nuclear detonation detection, environmental monitoring, military intelligence, surveillance, and reconnaissance, navigation warfare, command and control, and positioning, navigation, and timing.

A ceremony recognizing the establishment of the CFSCC occurred on October 1, 2019 at Vandenberg AFB.

Listed featured units on the CFSCC's webpage include the Combined Space Operations Center/Space Delta 5; the Commercial Integration Cell (CIC); the three other operations centers listed above; the U.S. Army 1st Space Brigade; Space Deltas 2, 3, 4, and 8; and the U.S. Army Satellite Operations Brigade (which is being transferred to the Space Force).

The Commercial Integration Cell (CIC) enables operational and technology exchange between operators at the Combined Space Operations Center and commercial satellite owner operator partners to assist real‐time and near real‐time information flow during daily routine operations and to enable rapid, informed response to critical unplanned space events or other activities.

== List of commanders ==
No.	Commander		Term			Service branch
No.	Portrait	Name	Took office	Left office	Term length	Service branch
1	Stephen Whiting	Major General; Stephen Whiting	29 August 2019	20 November 2019	83 days	U.S. Air Force
2	John E. Shaw	Major General; John E. Shaw	20 November 2019	16 November 2020	362 days	U.S. Air Force
3	DeAnna Burt	Major General; DeAnna Burt	16 November 2020	22 August 2022	1 year, 279 days	U.S. Space Force
4	Douglas Schiess	Major General; Douglas Schiess	22 August 2022	6 December 2023	1 year, 106 days	U.S. Space Force

== See also ==
- Space Operations Command
- Joint Task Force–Space Defense
