= 614th =

614th may refer to:

== Military units ==
- 614th (Devon) Fortress Company, Royal Engineers, a volunteer unit of Britain's Royal Engineers dating back to 1862
- 614th Air and Space Operations Center, a United States Air Force operations center
- 614th Radar Squadron, an inactive United States Air Force unit, last assigned to Cherry Point Marine Corps Air Station, North Carolina
- 614th Space Intelligence Squadron, unit located at Vandenberg AFB, California
- 614th Space Operations Squadron (614 SOPS) was a squadron of the United States Air Force (USAF) under Air Force Space Command (AFSPC)
- 614th Tactical Fighter Squadron, inactive United States Air Force unit
- 614th Tank Destroyer Battalion, tank destroyer battalion of the United States Army active during the Second World War

== Other uses ==
- 614th, the cardinal for the ordinal 614 (number)
- The 614th Commandment, propounded by Emil Fackenheim (1916–2003), noted Jewish philosopher and Reform rabbi

== See also ==
Military topics
Ships

- Cassard (D614), a post-Cold-War French navy ship with pennant D614, numbered 614
- USS Greenling (SSN-614), a Cold-War U.S. Navy submarine pennant SSN614, numbered 614
- HMS Hollesley Bay (K614), a post-WWII British Royal Navy ship with pennant K614, numbered 614
- USS Margaret O (SP-614), a WWI U.S. Navy speedboat pennat SP614, numbered 614
- French submarine Sultane (S614), a post-WWII French navy submarine pennant S614, numbered 614

Squadrons

- No. 614 Volunteer Gliding Squadron RAF, British Royal Air Force unit
- No. 614 Squadron RAF, British Royal Air Force unit

Other topics

- AD 614, the year 614 (DCXIV) of the Julian calendar
- 614 BC, the year
- 614 (disambiguation)
