= B. Chance Saltzman =

U.S. Space Force chief of space operations

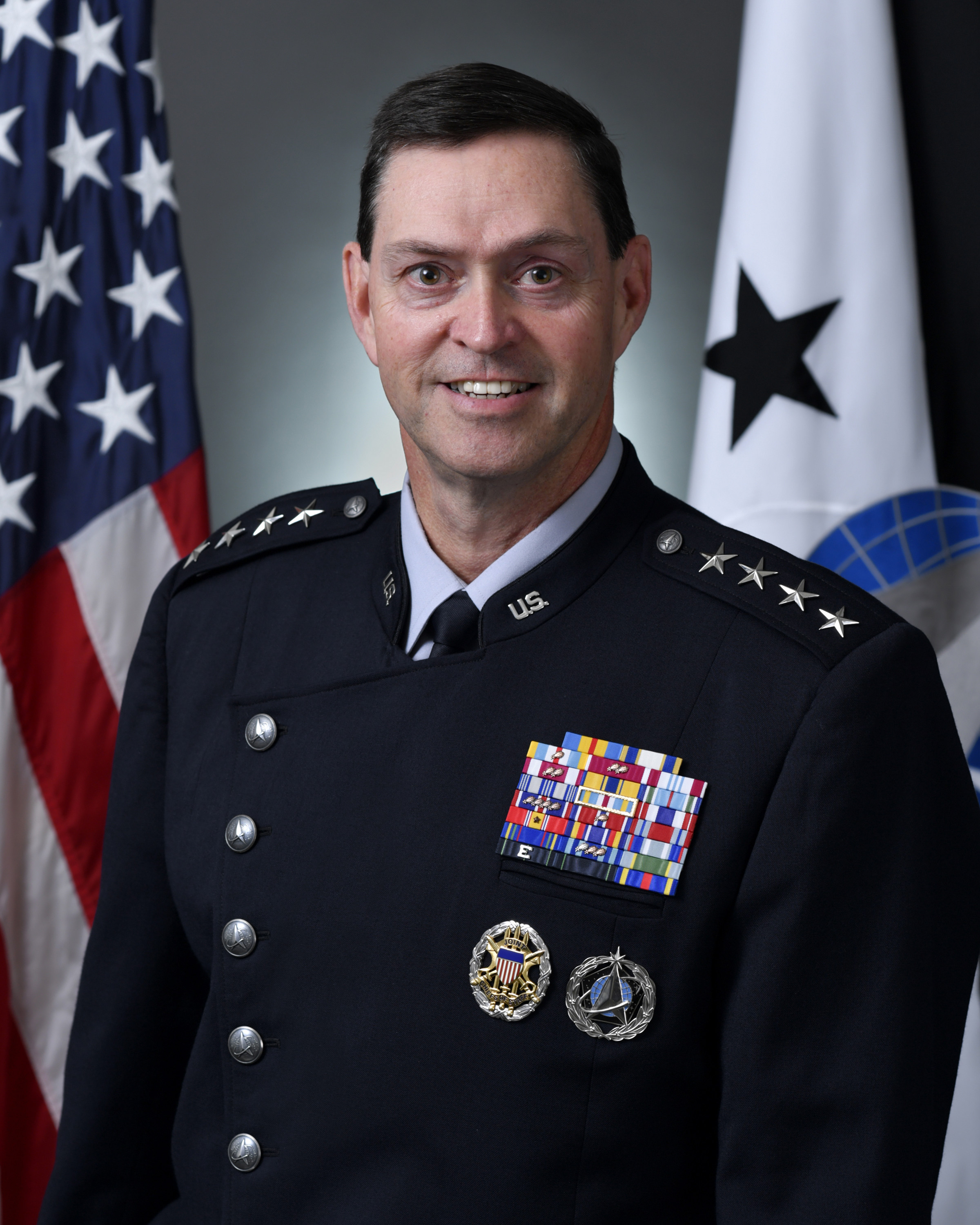
- Official portrait, 2026
- Nickname: Salty
- Born: June 30, 1969 (age 57); Daviess County, Kentucky, U.S.
- Allegiance: United States
- Branch: United States Air Force: United States Space Force
- Service years: 1991–2020 (Air Force): 2020–2026 (Space Force)
- Rank: General
- Commands: Chief of Space Operations; Aerospace Data Facility-Colorado; 460th Operations Group; 1st Space Control Squadron; 614th Space Operations Squadron
- Awards: Air Force Distinguished Service Medal; Defense Superior Service Medal (2); Legion of Merit (3)
- Education: Boston University (BA); University of Montana (MPA); George Washington University (MBA)
- Spouse: Jennifer Petersen (m. 1992)
- Children: 2
- B. Chance Saltzman's voice Saltzman outlines his priorities for the Space Force at a Senate Armed Services subcommittee hearing Recorded 14 March 2023

Bradley Chance Saltzman (born June 30, 1969) is a retired United States Space Force general who served as the second chief of space operations from November 2022 to September 2026. He served as the deputy chief of space operations for operations, cyber, and nuclear from 2020 to 2022. He is the first lieutenant general and the first general officer promoted into the Space Force.

Saltzman was born and raised in Kentucky. In 1991, he graduated from Boston University and was commissioned into the United States Air Force. He is a career missile and space operations officer with operational experience as a Minuteman III launch officer and as a satellite operator for the National Reconnaissance Office. He served as the last commander for both the 614th Space Operations Squadron and 1st Space Control Squadron, during which time he led the operations during the 2007 Chinese ASAT test. He also commanded the 460th Operations Group and Aerospace Data Facility-Colorado.

As a general officer, Saltzman has been called the "father of multi-domain operations" for his work in leading the Air Force multi-domain command and control effort. He was also the first non-flying officer to serve as deputy commander of the United States Air Forces Central Command. He transferred in 2020 to the Space Force, serving as its first chief operations officer.

== Early life and education ==
Saltzman was born to Belinda C. Troutman in Daviess County, Kentucky, in 1969. His father and grandfather were in the United States Army. He grew up in Bowling Green, Kentucky, attending Bowling Green High School where he played tennis.

Saltzman studied at Boston University on an Air Force scholarship, graduating in 1991 with a B.A. degree in history. He later completed a Master of Public Administration degree at the University of Montana in 1994 and a Master of Strategic Management degree from the George Washington University School of Business in 1998. He also completed seminar programs at the University of North Carolina at Chapel Hill and Harvard Kennedy School.

Saltzman underwent undergraduate missile training at Vandenberg Air Force Base, California, in 1992, less than a year after commissioning into the Air Force. In 1997, he earned the Air Assault Badge from attending the United States Army Air Assault School. He is also a space weapons officer, graduating from the USAF Weapons School in 2001, where students are taught how to be weapons instructors in their units. During his promotion to lieutenant general in 2020, General John W. Raymond pointed to Saltzman's entrance to the weapons school as one of his defining qualities. "[If] you think about Salty, that's what I think of: as an instructor", said Raymond. "Just last week, we went out to Vandenberg... Two young captains briefed me on what they were doing, and then I continued the tour. And for about another 20 or 30 minutes, I was looking and I said, 'Where'd General Saltzman go?' Well, he was sitting down with those two captains teaching, and sitting down having a conversation, and helping them think through what they had just briefed, and helping them understand the importance of the work they were doing".

Saltzman's other professional military education included attending Squadron Officer School, Air Command and Staff College, School of Advanced Air and Space Studies, Air War College, National Security Space Institute, Center for Creative Leadership, National Defense University, Institute for Defense Business, and LeMay Center for Doctrine Development and Education.

== Military career ==
=== Early Air Force career ===
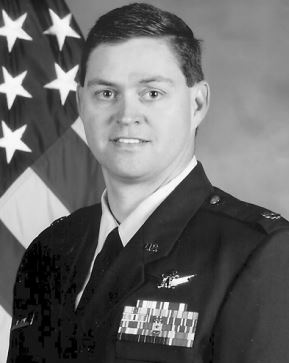
Saltzman as a lieutenant colonel

Saltzman was commissioned into the United States Air Force on 15 May 1991, as a second lieutenant through Boston University's Air Force Reserve Officer Training Corps program. After earning distinguished graduate honors from missile operational readiness training at Vandenberg Air Force Base, California, he held numerous missile crew, instructor, and evaluator positions at Malmstrom Air Force Base, culminating in his selection as the senior evaluator crew commander at the 10th Strategic Missile Squadron and 341st Strategic Missile Wing. While assigned to the 341st Missile Wing, he competed in the inaugural Guardian Challenge Space Competition and led the team to the 1995 Blanchard Trophy for the best missile operations squadron.

In 1996, Saltzman was selected for the Air Force Intern Program where he was assigned to the Air Force Office of the Director of Intelligence, Surveillance, and Reconnaissance and the Air Staff History Office. While on the Air Staff, he worked planning, programming and budgeting issues for the Information Warfare Panel; wrote higher headquarters inspection classification guidance for information operations; and provided historical research for the chief of staff. In 1998, he was assigned to the National Reconnaissance Office (NRO), Operating Division Four (OD-4). In OD-4, he served as flight commander, senior flight commander and mission planning flight commander responsible for planning and command and control of three NRO reconnaissance satellite constellations. He also served as the on-console launch officer and led early-orbit engineering checkout for a $1 billion NRO satellite.

In 2000, Saltzman was selected to attend the USAF Weapons School. After graduating from the Weapons School in 2001, he was selected to remain at the Weapons School as an instructor. While there, he served as academics flight commander and an assistant director of operations.

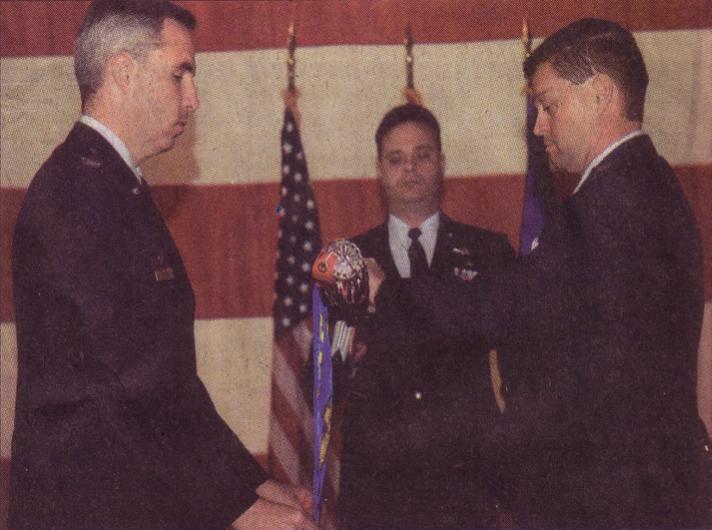
Col Whiting (left) and Lt Col Saltzman (right) during the inactivation of the 1st Space Control Squadron

From 2003 to 2007, Saltzman returned to Vandenberg to serve in a variety of assignments. In March 2003, he served in the Fourteenth Air Force's strategy division as the chief of operational assessment during Operation Iraqi Freedom. In July 2005, he was assigned as the first chief of combat plans for the Joint Space Operations Center, and later, as chief of combat operations. He served as the last commander for both the 614th Space Operations Squadron and 1st Space Control Squadron before their inactivation and their missions were merged to the 614th Air and Space Operations Center in 2007 and 2008, respectively.

On 11 January 2007, then-Lieutenant Colonel Saltzman was serving under Colonel Stephen N. Whiting, then the director of the Joint Space Operations Center, and with Major DeAnna Burt, who succeeded Saltzman as chief of combat plans, when the 2007 Chinese anti-satellite missile test occurred. Recalling what he believes is the key date of modern military space operations history, Whiting noted, "We watched that test unfold over time, and we led the response for U.S. STRATCOM. We spent weeks and weeks figuring out how we would notify national leadership in real time. And those of us who was there knew the world had changed, on that day".

After his command tour, Saltzman studied at Harvard University as a national security fellow at the Harvard Kennedy School. In July 2009, he was promoted to colonel and returned to the Pentagon as the chief of the strategic plans and policy division. From 2010 to 2014, he was stationed at Buckley Air Force Base in Aurora, Colorado, as commander of the 460th Operations Group from June 2010 to June 2012 and commander of the NRO's Aerospace Data Facility-Colorado from June 2012 to June 2014.

In June 2014, Saltzman transferred to the Air Force Space Command (AFSPC) at Peterson Air Force Base, Colorado, as the deputy director of plans and programs. After less than a year in that stint, he was chosen as the executive officer to General John E. Hyten, then AFSPC commander. It was during this time when he was nominated for promotion to general officer in March 2016 and confirmed by the Senate a month later. On 3 July 2016, he was promoted to brigadier general.

=== Multi-domain command and control ===
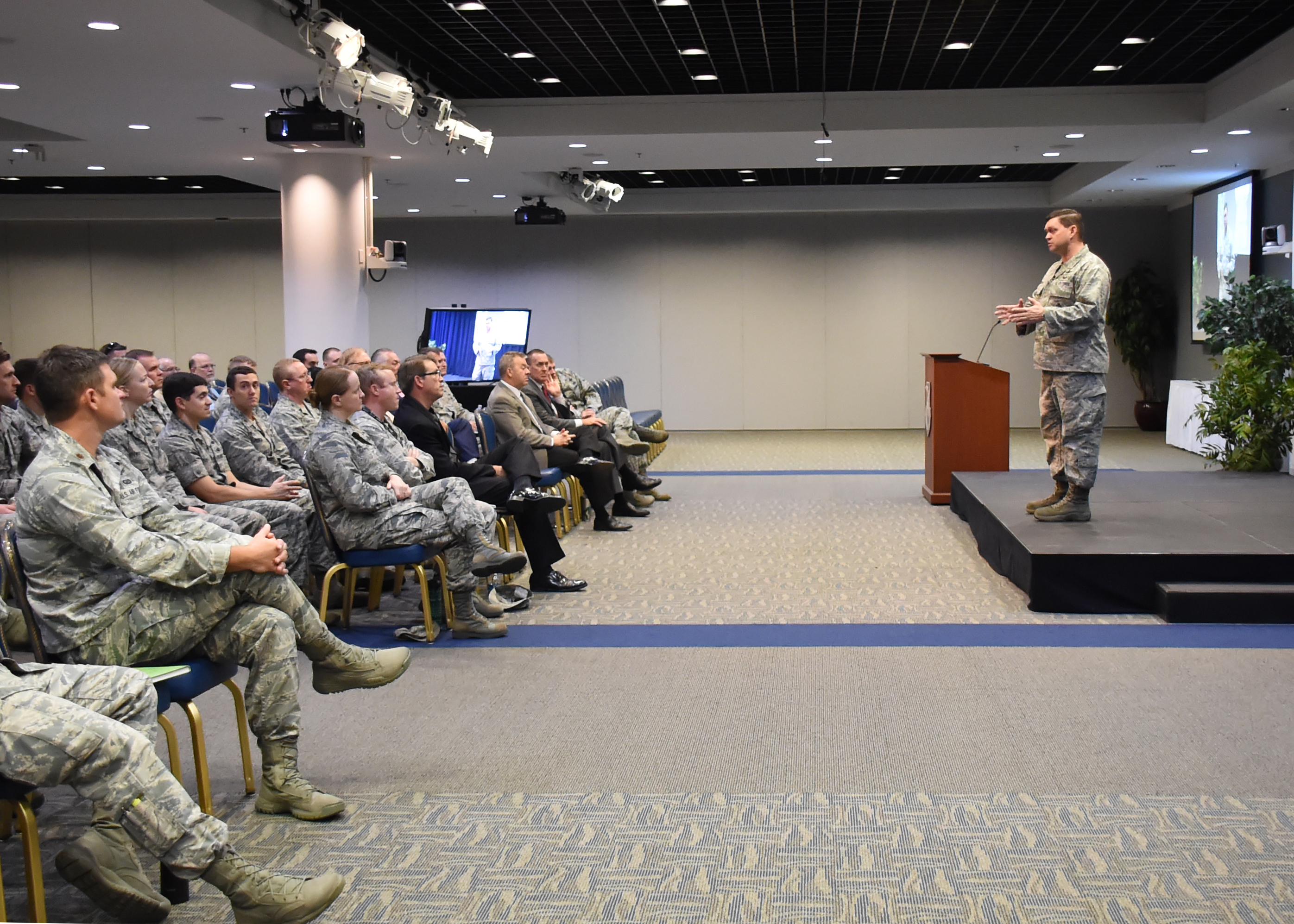
Saltzman, who led the Air Force's Multi-Domain Command and Control (MDC2), explains the concept to airmen at the Space and Missile Systems Center, 2017

In September 2016, General David L. Goldfein outlined his three priorities as chief of staff of the United States Air Force. Among them was advancing multi-domain, multi-functional command and control. Saltzman, who was then director of future operations at the Air Force headquarters, was handpicked by Goldfein to lead the multi-domain command and control (MDC2) effort. He served as director of Air Force Strategic Integration Group, running the service's yearlong study of MDC2. For his work on MDC2, he has been called as the "father of multi-domain operations", which is now known in the United States Department of Defense as joint all-domain command and control.

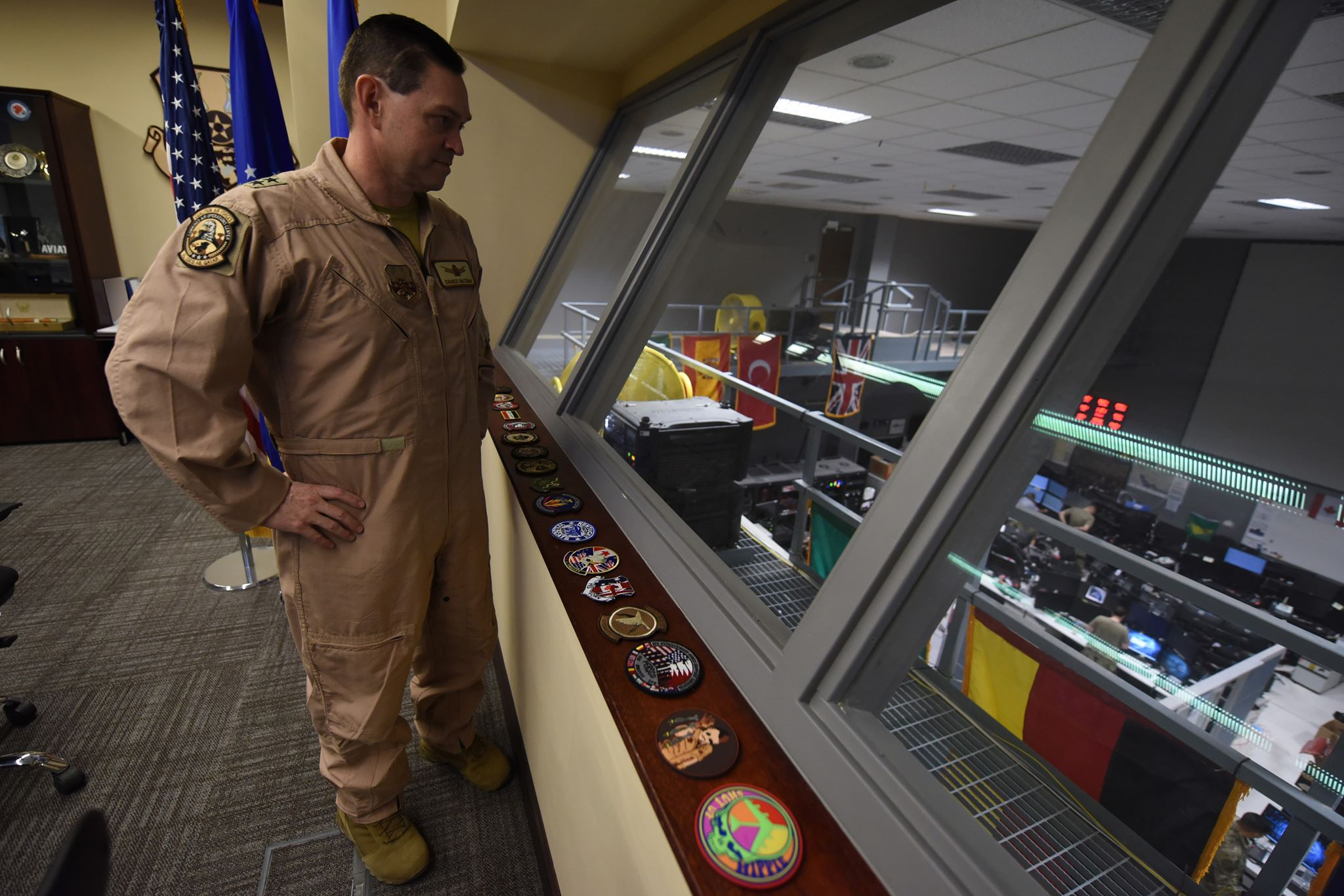
Saltzman was the first non-flying officer to serve as deputy commander of the U.S. Air Forces Central Command

After his stint at the Pentagon, Saltzman was chosen by Lieutenant General Joseph T. Guastella, commander of the U.S. Air Forces Central Command (AFCENT), as his deputy commander. He is the first AFCENT deputy commander to come from a non-flying background.

=== Transfer to the Space Force ===
The United States Space Force was established while Saltzman was at AFCENT as deputy commander. By July 2020, after his tour in Southwest Asia, he went back to the Pentagon to serve as acting director of staff of the United States Space Force, a post held by retiring Major General Clinton Crosier. He held this position until he was among the four Air Force major generals selected for promotion to lieutenant general and transfer to the Space Force.

Saltzman transferred into the Space Force and was promoted to lieutenant general during a ceremony on 14 August 2020, making him the first lieutenant general of the Space Force and the first general officer promoted into the new service. During the ceremony, General John W. Raymond remarked:

I think it's very appropriate that the first general who comes in is a warfighter. I think that sends a really strong message that this is an armed service, and we are about deterring conflict that could begin or extend into space. We couldn't ask for a better person.

— General John W. Raymond

Saltzman assumed the position of deputy chief of space operations for operations, cyber, and nuclear, becoming the first chief operations officer of the Space Force with overall responsibility for intelligence, operations, sustainment, cyber, and nuclear operations.

As chief operations officer, Saltzman plays a key role in defining readiness in the Space Force. He also has a role in the establishment of Space Force component commands to unified combatant commands. In November 2021, he announced that the service was establishing Space Force elements in the United States European Command, United States Indo-Pacific Command, United States Central Command, and United States Forces Korea.

=== Chief of Space Operations ===
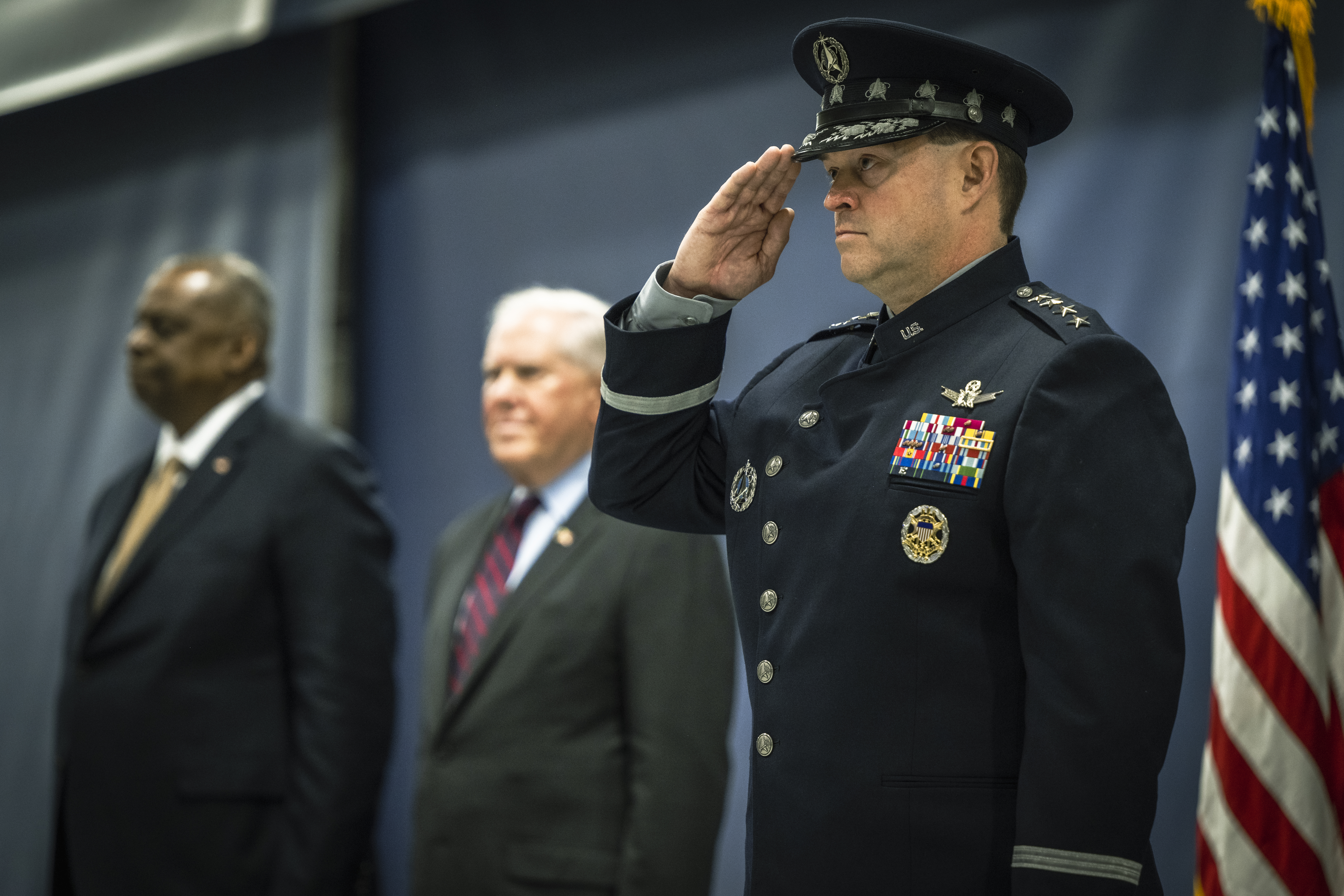
Saltzman renders a salute during his transition ceremony after he relieved Raymond as the second CSO, 2022

On 27 July 2022, U.S. President Joe Biden nominated Saltzman for promotion to general and appointment as the second chief of space operations (CSO) of the Space Force. One of four lieutenant generals considered, Saltzman was a dark horse candidate for the job. The outgoing CSO, General Raymond, with whom he has close personal ties dating back years, strongly supported his selection. Saltzman testified before a United States Senate Committee on Armed Services hearing on 13 September 2022. In his opening statement, he mentioned three broad fronts he would focus on as CSO: maturing as an independent service, leveraging partnerships, and innovating to accomplish missions. His nomination was confirmed by voice vote of the Senate on 29 September 2022.

On 2 November 2022, Saltzman assumed office as the second chief of space operations during the Space Force's first change of responsibility ceremony. He pledged to build on the Space Force's achievements while also infusing the service with new approaches.

As chief, Saltzman has sent out "C-notes" to guardians as a means of communicating with them, an adaptation of Admiral Elmo Zumwalt's "Z-grams". In a series of three C-notes in January 2023, he released three lines of efforts that would guide his term as chief: (1) fielding combat-ready forces, (2) amplifying the guardian spirit, and (3) partnering to win. In February 2023, he unveiled his "Theory of Success", intended to initiate a debate within the service. Two weeks later, he unveiled the concept of Competitive Endurance as a theory of success for the Space Force, which has three core tenets: (1) avoiding operational surprise, (2) denying first-mover advantage, and (3) responsible counterspace campaigning.

In another C-note, Saltzman criticized the existing mission statement of the Space Force, noting that it falls short of explaining the mission of the service. He used the memo to crowd-source ideas for revising the mission statement.

On 1 April 2026, Saltzman said that the Space Force is deeply integrated into the joint operations against Iran, assisting with communications, targeting, and navigation. Saltzman was involved in the Space Force's effort to achieve space superiority over Iran during the conflict, including by supporting its regional component field command, Space Forces Central.

He retired from the Space Force on 13 August 2026.

== Personal life ==
Saltzman married Jennifer (Petersen) Saltzman on 12 September 1992. They have two children, John and Sarah.

== Awards and decorations ==
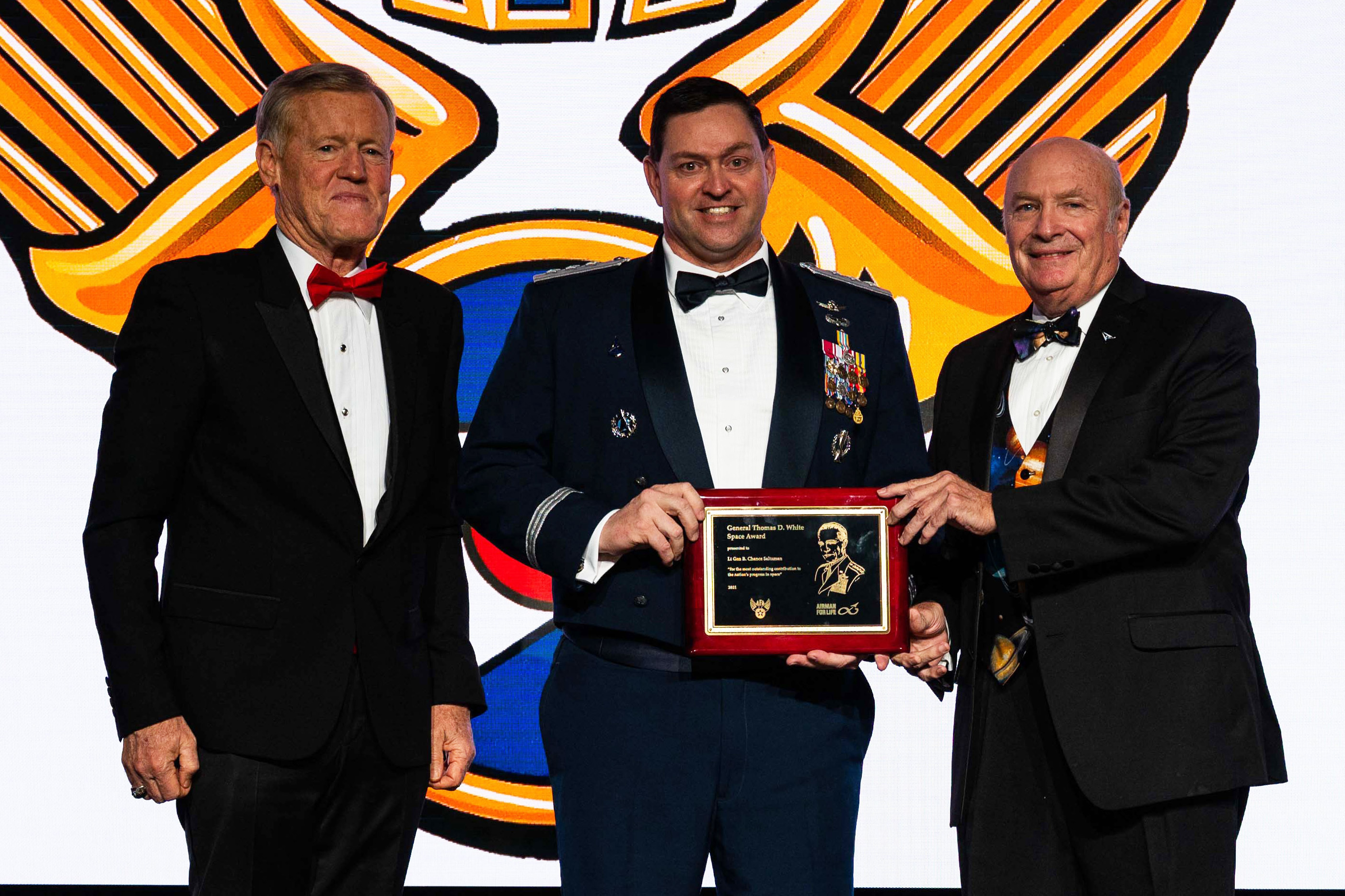
Saltzman (center) receives the General Thomas D. White Space Award during the Air Force Association's Inaugural Space Force Ball, 2021

Saltzman is the recipient of the following awards and decorations:

=== Badges ===
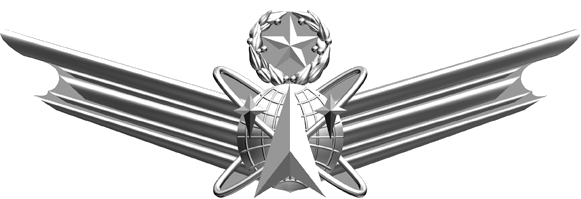
Command Space Operations Badge

Air Assault Badge

Basic Missile Operations Badge

Office of the Joint Chiefs of Staff Identification Badge

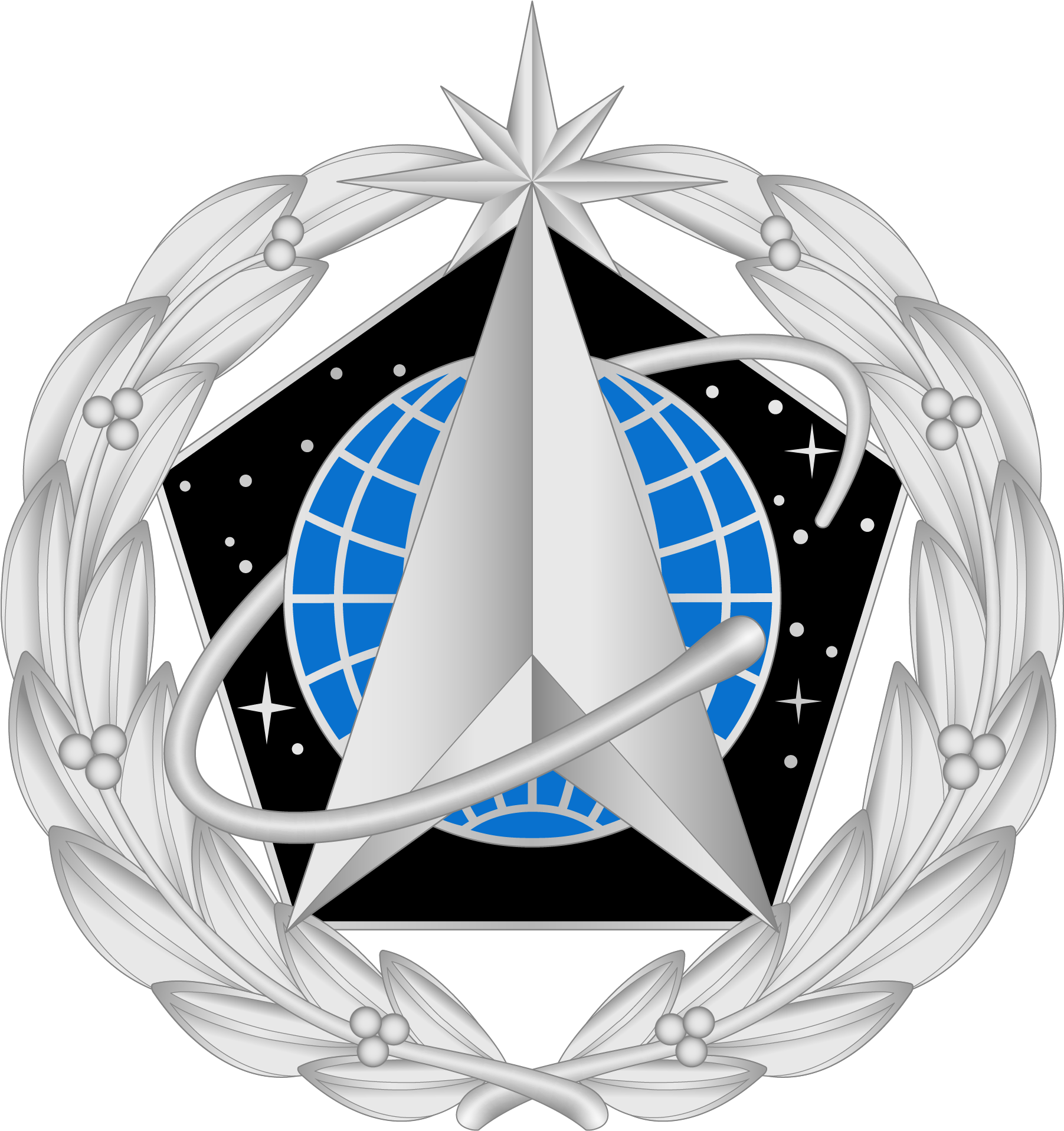

Space Staff Badge

=== Ribbons ===
Air Force Distinguished Service Medal
Defense Superior Service Medal with one bronze oak leaf cluster
Legion of Merit with two bronze oak leaf clusters
Defense Meritorious Service Medal
Meritorious Service Medal with two bronze oak leaf clusters
Air Force Commendation Medal with oak leaf cluster
Joint Service Achievement Medal
Air Force Achievement Medal
Joint Meritorious Unit Award
Air Force Meritorious Unit Award
Air Force Outstanding Unit Award with four bronze oak leaf clusters
Air Force Organizational Excellence Award with one bronze oak leaf cluster
Combat Readiness Medal
National Defense Service Medal with one bronze service star
Global War on Terrorism Service Medal
Air and Space Campaign Medal
Nuclear Deterrence Operations Service Medal
Air Force Longevity Service Award with one silver and one bronze oak leaf clusters
Small Arms Expert Marksmanship Ribbon
Navy Expert Rifleman Medal
Navy Pistol Marksmanship
Air Force Training Ribbon

=== Awards ===
- Air Force Association's Thomas D. White Space Award (2021)

== Dates of promotion ==
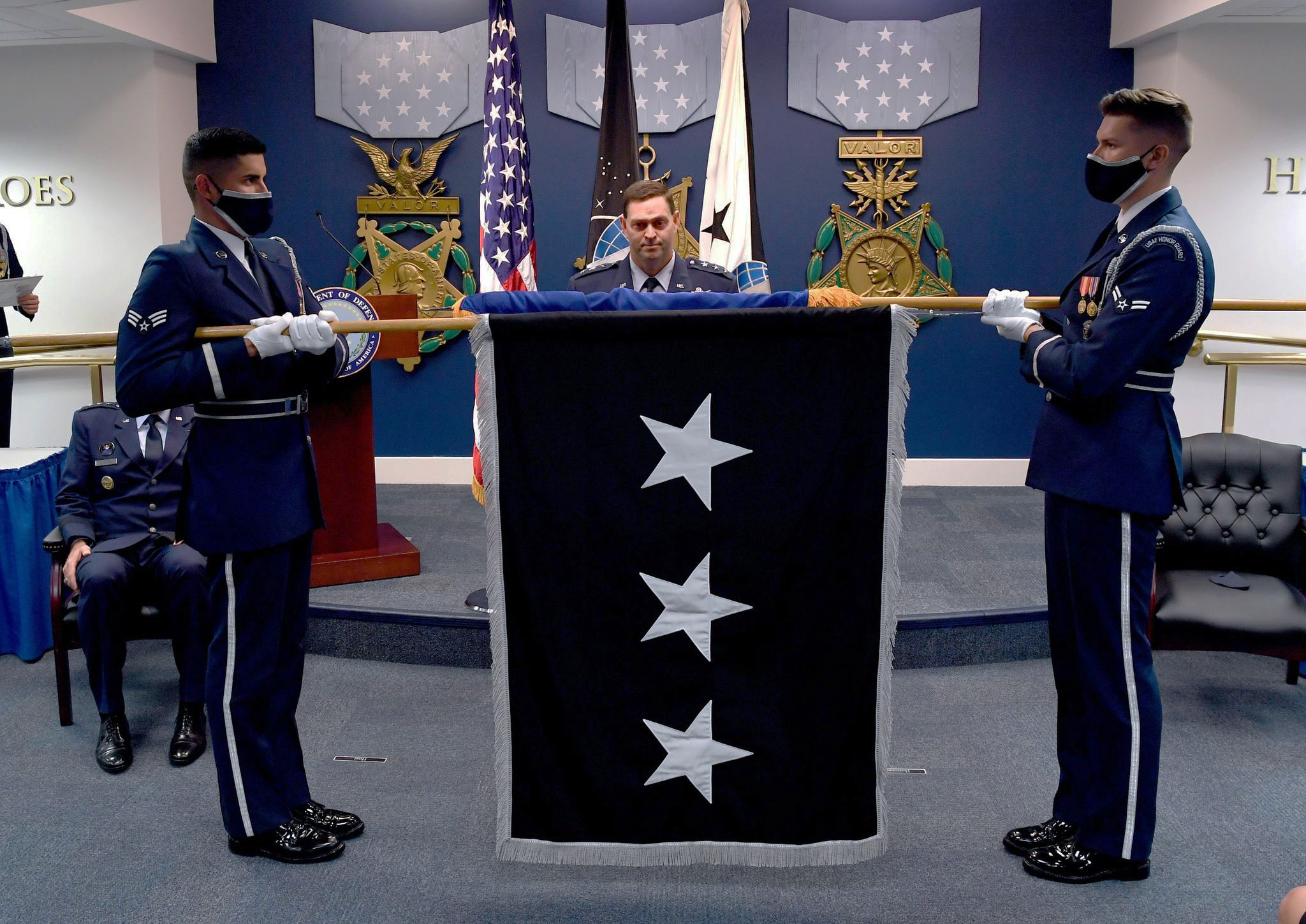
Saltzman being presented with the very first three-star flag in the U.S. Space Force during his promotion, 14 August 2020

Rank	Branch	Date
Second lieutenant	Air Force	15 May 1991
First lieutenant	Air Force	18 October 1993
Captain	Air Force	18 October 1995
Major	Air Force	1 August 2002
Lieutenant colonel	Air Force	1 March 2006
Colonel	Air Force	1 October 2009
Brigadier general	Air Force	3 July 2016
Major general	Air Force	4 September 2019
Lieutenant general	Space Force	7 August 2020
General	Space Force	2 November 2022

== Writings ==
=== Books ===
- With Tom Searle (2001). Introduction to the United States Air Force (PDF). Maxwell Air Force Base, Alabama: Air University Press. ISBN 978-1478352686.

=== Articles ===
- With James Wood Forsyth Jr. and J. Wesley Hutto (Summer 2022). "Ten Propositions Regarding Great Power Politics" (PDF). Æther: A Journal of Strategic Airpower & Spacepower. 1 (2): 5–12.
- With James Wood Forsyth Jr. (Winter 2010). "Minimum Deterrence and Its Critics" (PDF). Strategic Studies Quarterly. 4 (4): 3–12. JSTOR 26269812.
- With James Wood Forsyth Jr. and Gary Schaub Jr. (Spring 2010). "Remembrance of Things Past: The Enduring Value of Nuclear Weapons" (PDF). Strategic Studies Quarterly. 4 (4): 3–12. JSTOR 26269812.
- With James Wood Forsyth Jr. (Summer 2009). "Stay Out: Why Intervention Should Not Be America's Policy" (PDF). Strategic Studies Quarterly. 3 (2): 3–12. JSTOR 26269812.
- With William Liquori (December 2006). "Counterspace Command and Control: Looking to History for Advice" (PDF). In Brown, Kendall K. (ed.). Space Power Integration: Perspective from Space Weapons Officer. Maxwell Air Force Base, Alabama: Air University Press. pp. 159–168. ISBN 1-58566-158-9.

=== Thesis ===
- Liberty and Justice for All: The Democracy Project and the Global War on Terrorism (PDF) (Thesis). School of Advanced Air and Space Studies. 2005. Archived (PDF) from the original on 12 August 2021.

Military offices
Preceded by Brian Fredrickson	Commander of the 614th Space Operations Squadron; 2006–2007	Position abolished
Preceded by Michael Mason	Commander of the 1st Space Control Squadron; 2010–2012	Position abolished
Preceded by Richard Schoonmaker	Commander of the 460th Operations Group; 2010–2012	Succeeded by DeAnna Burt
Preceded by Ronald L. Huntley	Commander of Aerospace Data Facility-Colorado; 2012–2014	Succeeded by Daniel Wright
New office	Deputy Chief of Space Operations for Operations, Cyber, and Nuclear; 2020–2022	Succeeded by DeAnna Burt
Preceded by John W. Raymond	Chief of Space Operations; 2022–2026	Succeeded by Douglas Schiess
Order of precedence
Preceded by Christopher J. Mahoney as Vice Chairman of the Joint Chiefs of Staff	Order of precedence of the United States as Chief of Space Operations	Succeeded by Randy A. George as Chief of Staff of the Army
