= 614 (disambiguation) =

614 may refer to:

- 614 (number), a number in the 600s
- AD 614, the 614th year of the Common Era
- 614 BC, the 614th year before the common era
- 614th (disambiguation)
- 614 Pia, asteroid #614, the 614th asteroid registered, a main-belt asteroid
- NGC 614, a galaxy in the Triangulum constellation
- Area code 614, a telephone area code in the North American numbering plan, serving Columbus, Ohio, USA
- Route 614, see List of highways numbered 614
- No. 614 Volunteer Gliding Squadron RAF, British Royal Air Force unit
- No. 614 Squadron RAF, British Royal Air Force unit
- Type 614 research vessel, a ship class of the People's Liberation Army Navy of the People's Republic of China
- DB Class 614, diesel multiple unit train set class of Deutsche Bundesbahn
- Chesapeake and Ohio 614, a steam locomotive train engine
- Bus route 614, one of two The Comet routes operated by Uno of Hertfordshire

== See also ==
- 614th (disambiguation)
- D614G mutation of the COVID-19 virus SARS-CoV-2, which became dominant in the summer of 2020
- Cassard (D614), a post-Cold-War French navy ship with pennant D614, numbered 614
- USS Greenling (SSN-614), a Cold-War U.S. Navy submarine pennant SSN614, numbered 614
- HMS Hollesley Bay (K614), a post-WWII British Royal Navy ship with pennant K614, numbered 614
- USS Margaret O (SP-614), a WWI U.S. Navy speedboat pennat SP614, numbered 614
- French submarine Sultane (S614), a post-WWII French navy submarine pennant S614, numbered 614
- Minuscule 614, a Greek manuscript of the New Testament
- Uppland Runic Inscription 614
