= 614th Space Operations Squadron =

Former US Air Force unit

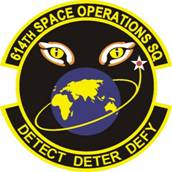
614 SOPS Emblem

The 614th Space Operations Squadron (614 SOPS) was a squadron of the United States Air Force (USAF) under Air Force Space Command (AFSPC). By AFSPC order the unit inactivated 24 May 2007. Its mission and members moved to the Combat Operations Division of the 614th Air and Space Operations Center (614 AOC). The inactivation was part of the larger USAF plan to implement the Numbered Air Force-Component structure. The unit's members became the plankholders of the 614th Air and Space Operations Center and the Joint Space Operations Center.

== Mission ==
The 614th Space Operations Squadron mission was to provide Air Force Space Command's Fourteenth Air Force Commander (14 AF/CC (AFSTRAT-SP)) and US Strategic Command’s Commander, Joint Functional Component Command for Space (CDR JFCC SPACE) with the space operations expertise to command and control space forces in continuous support of global and theater operations.

Representing the 14 AF/CC (AFSTRAT-SP) and CDR JFCC SPACE, the 614 SOPS delivered Air Force space force capabilities to users around the globe, 24-hours a day.

== History ==
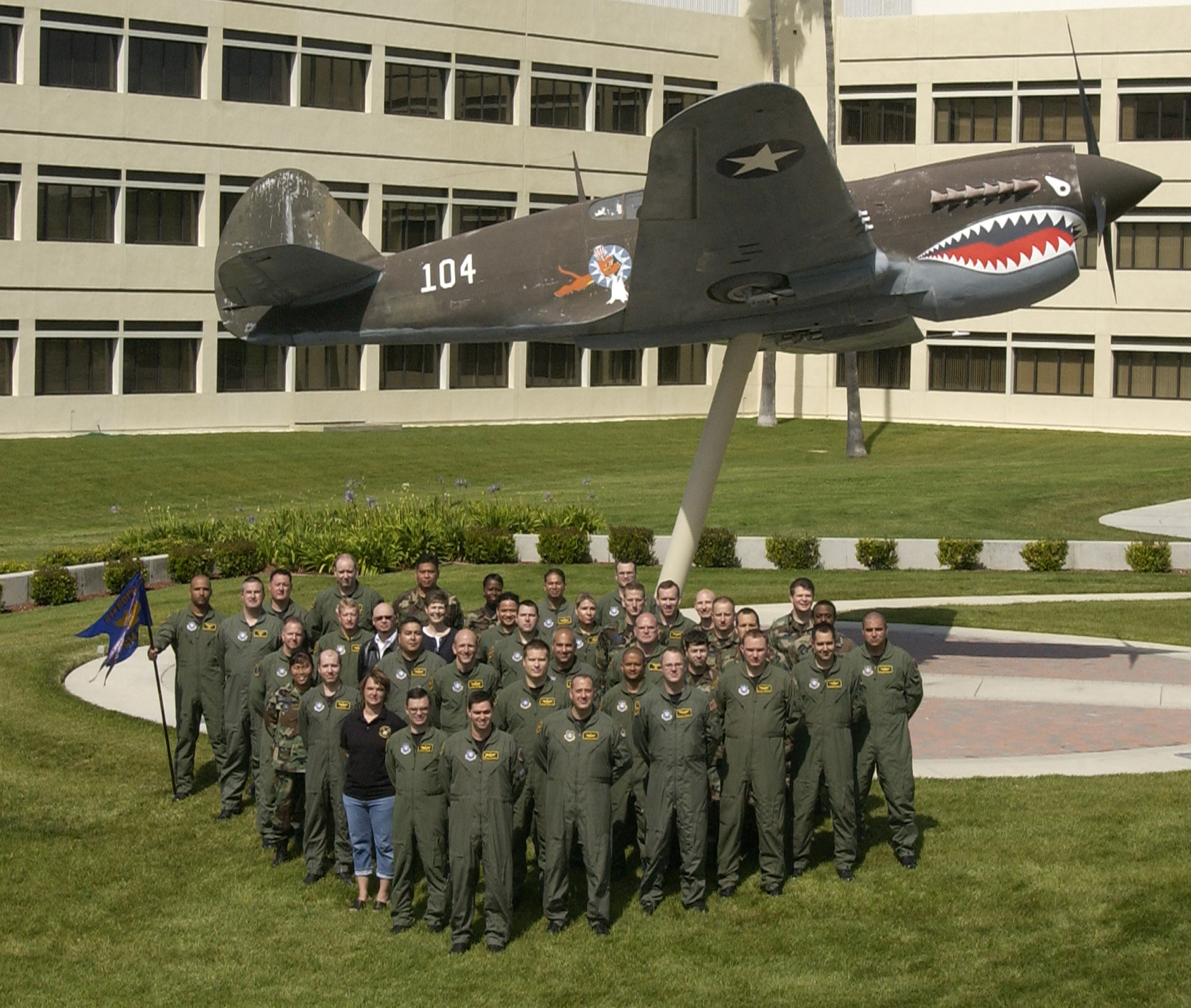
The last official photo of the 614 SOPS (18 May 2007)

The 614 SOPS was first constituted as the 614th Space Operations Flight (SOPF) in April 1996 with thirty-seven assigned members. Initially housed in two temporary facilities, the 614 SOPF christened a new Space Operations Center (SOC) in November 1997. The SOC was redesignated the Joint Space Operations Center (JSpOC) in July 1999 under the command of Major General Robert Hinson . With the support Headquarters Air Force Space Command, the JSpOC manpower grew to over 100 positions. With the May 2005 ribbon-cutting of the new JSpOC, along with the stand up of the 614th Space Intelligence Squadron and 614th Space Communications Squadron, as well as the alignment of the 1st Space Control Squadron under the 614th Space Operations Group, and augmentation of the 9th Space Operations Squadron (Air Force Reserve) in every joint mission area, the 614 SOPS transitioned from the sole force provider to one of several force providers to the JSpOC.

With the January 2005 stand-up of the 614th Space Communications Squadron, the four Satellite Communication (SATCOM) Support Centers located at Peterson AFB, Colorado; MacDill AFB, Florida; Stuttgart, Germany; and Wahiawa, Hawaii transferred from 614 SOPS administrative control. These operating locations and their twenty-five communications NCOs had been under 614 SOPS control since October 1999.

A combination of the realignment of the Numbered Air Force components with the implementation of Program Action Directive 06-09 (Nov 2006), the redesignation of the 614th Space Operations Group to the 614th Air and Space Operations Center, and the signature of an AFSPC special order, the squadron of inactivated on 24 May 2007. A ceremony celebrating their past and look toward the future was conducted by Maj Gen William L. Shelton on 18 Jun 2007 in front of the HQ 14 AF.

== Honors ==
Members assigned to the 614 SOPS have a distinguished history earning many awards, including the Air Force Organizational Excellence Award in 1998; Air Force Outstanding Unit for 2005, 2006 and 2007; and Air Force Association Citation of Honor for 2006. As a force provider to the Joint Space Operations Center, the squadron also shared in the honors as the 2005 and 2007 winner of USSTRATCOM's Omaha Trophy for the Best Space and Information Operations Unit.

Air Force Outstanding Unit Award Air Force Organizational Excellence Award

== Emblem ==
The 614 SOPS patch primary colors were black and gold. Black signifies dignity and determination and gold represents excellence, honor, and high values: the qualities and spirit of the 614 SOPS. The tiger eyes represent the mission for assessing the status of the 14 Air Force space forces. The globe, with the overseas landmasses, symbolizes the squadron’s worldwide mission. Additionally, the Air Force star shows our tie to the original Army Air Corps. The parabolic arch encircling the globe denotes command and control of space forces operating weapons systems traversing through space.

The 614 Air and Space Operations Center/Combat Operations Division (614 AOC/COD) patch, shown above, is a morale patch and not approved by Air Force Heraldry. With exception of the top and bottom rockers, the patch is exactly the same as the 614 SOPS patch. The patch was issued to division members after the inactivation of the 614 SOPS.

== Chain of Command ==
- United States Air Force
- Air Force Space Command
- 14th Air Force (unit was redesignated 14 AF (AFSTRAT-SP) on 24 May 2007)
- 614th Space Operations Group (unit was redesignated 614th Air and Space Operations Center (614 AOC) on 24 May 2007)

== Past Unit Commanders ==
- Lt Col James G. Lee, June 1996 – March 1998 (first 614 SOPF/CC)
- Lt Col Teresa A. H. Djuric, March 1998 – June 2000 (first 614 SOPS/CC; now Brig Gen, USAF)
- Lt Col Cary C. Chun, June 2000 – June 2002 (now Brig Gen, USAF)
- Lt Col Donald McGee, June 2002 – May 2004 (now Colonel, USAF)
- Lt Col Brian Fredrickson, May 2004 – June 2006 (now Colonel, USAF)
- Lt Col B. Chance Saltzman, June 2006 – 24 May 2007 (now General, USSF)

== Gallery ==
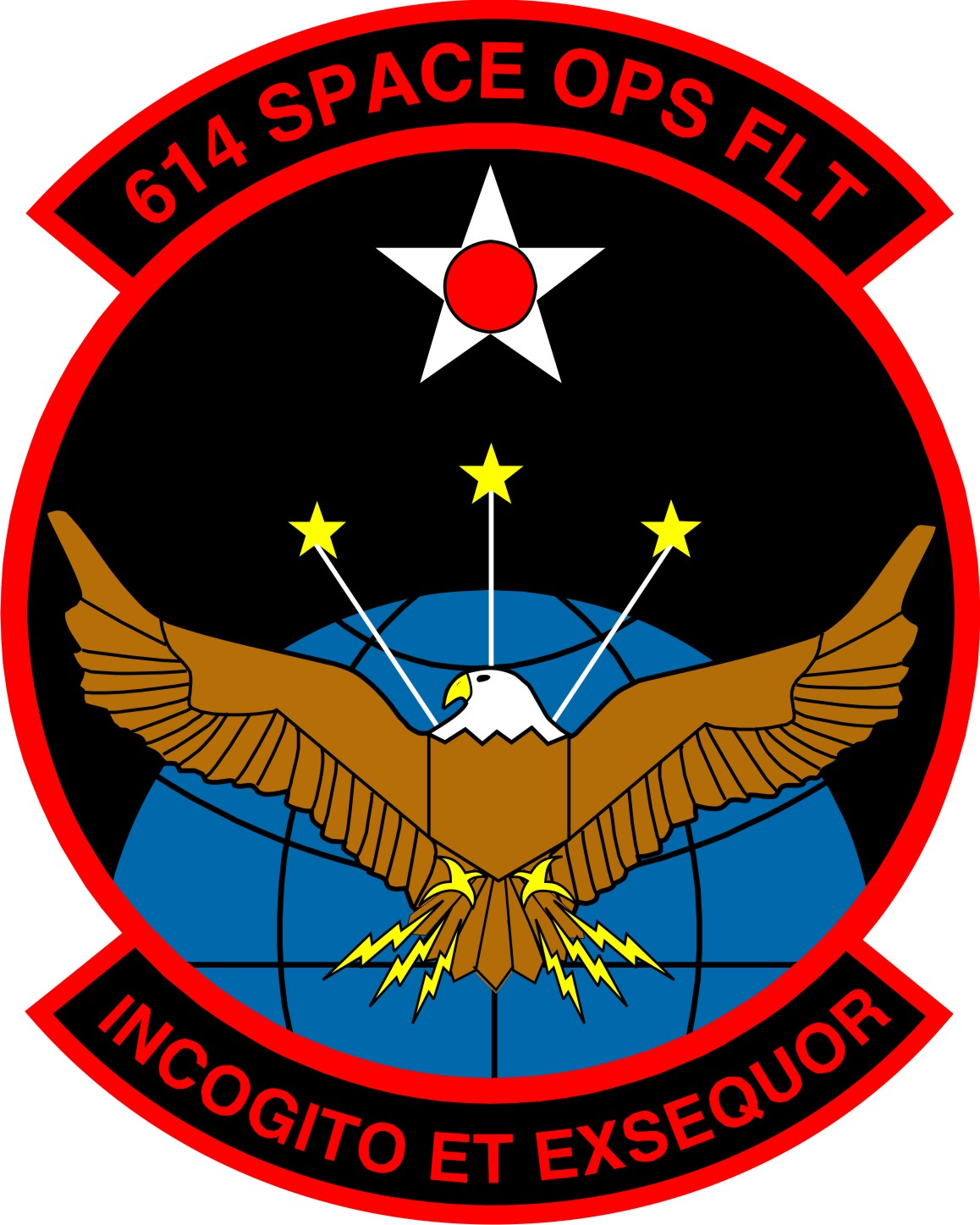
614 SOPF Emblem

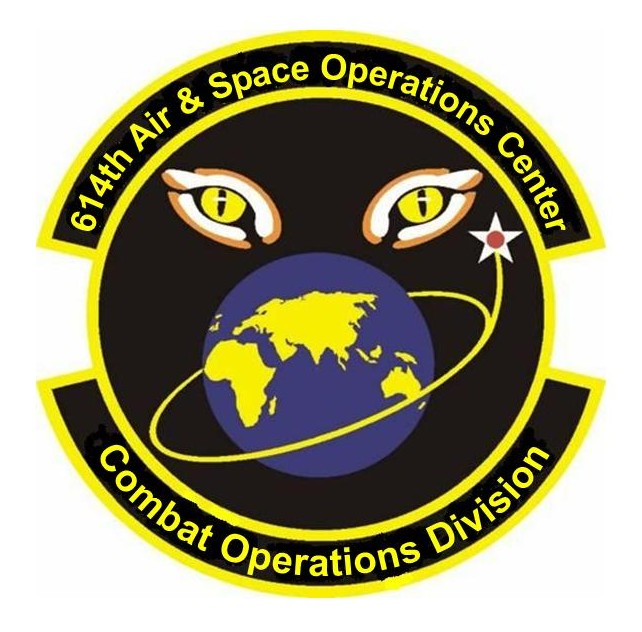
614 AOC/COD Emblem

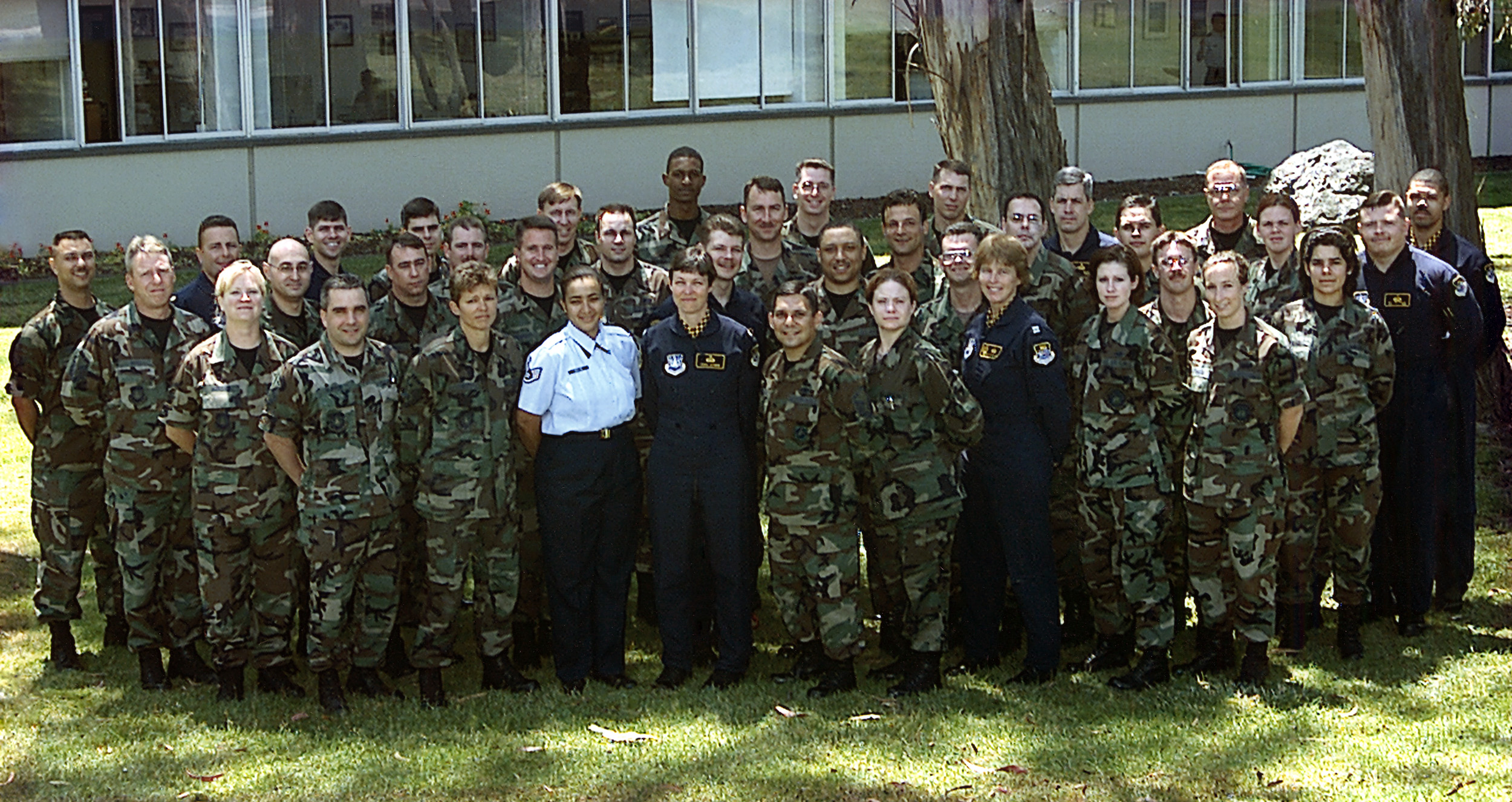
614 SOPS (May 2000)

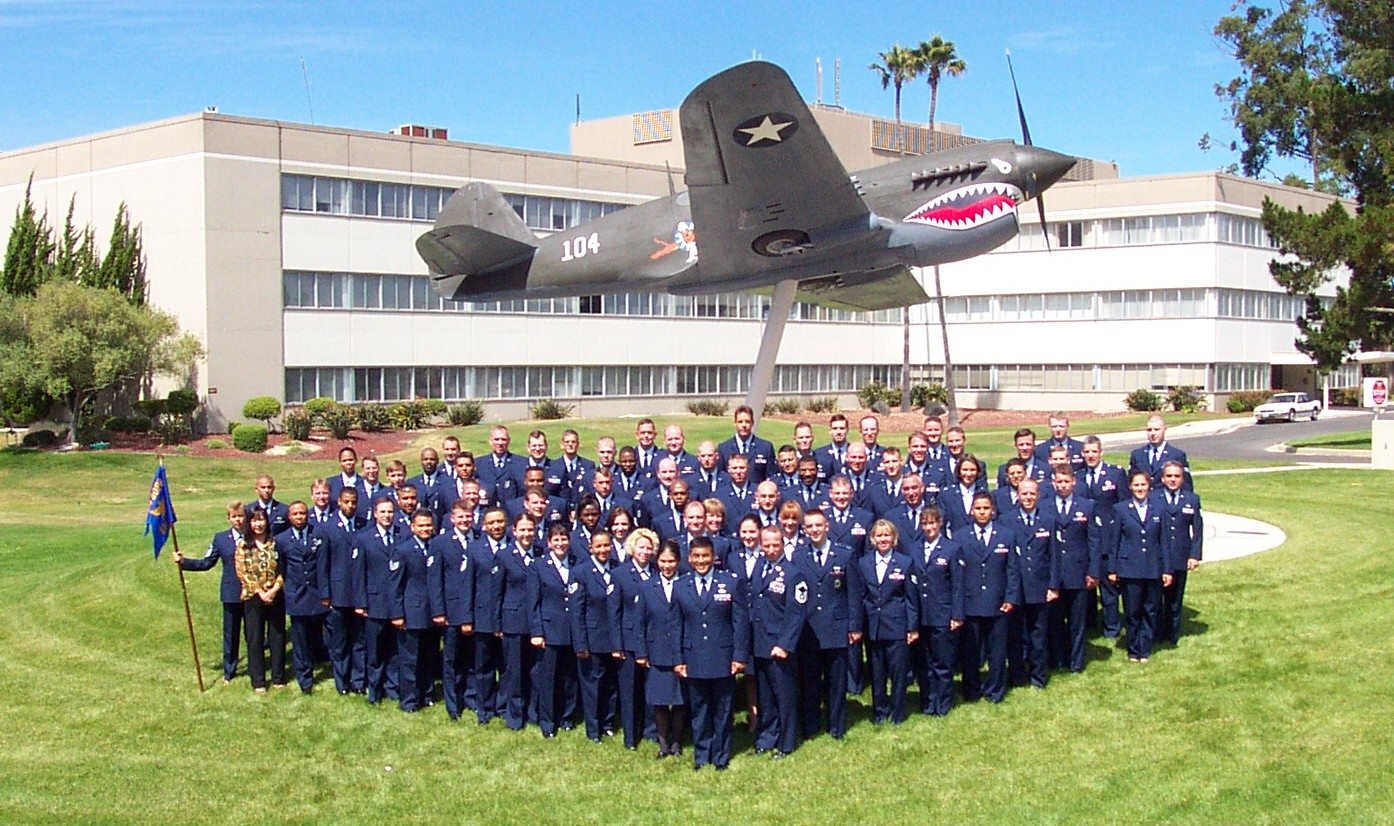
614 SOPS (26 June 2001)

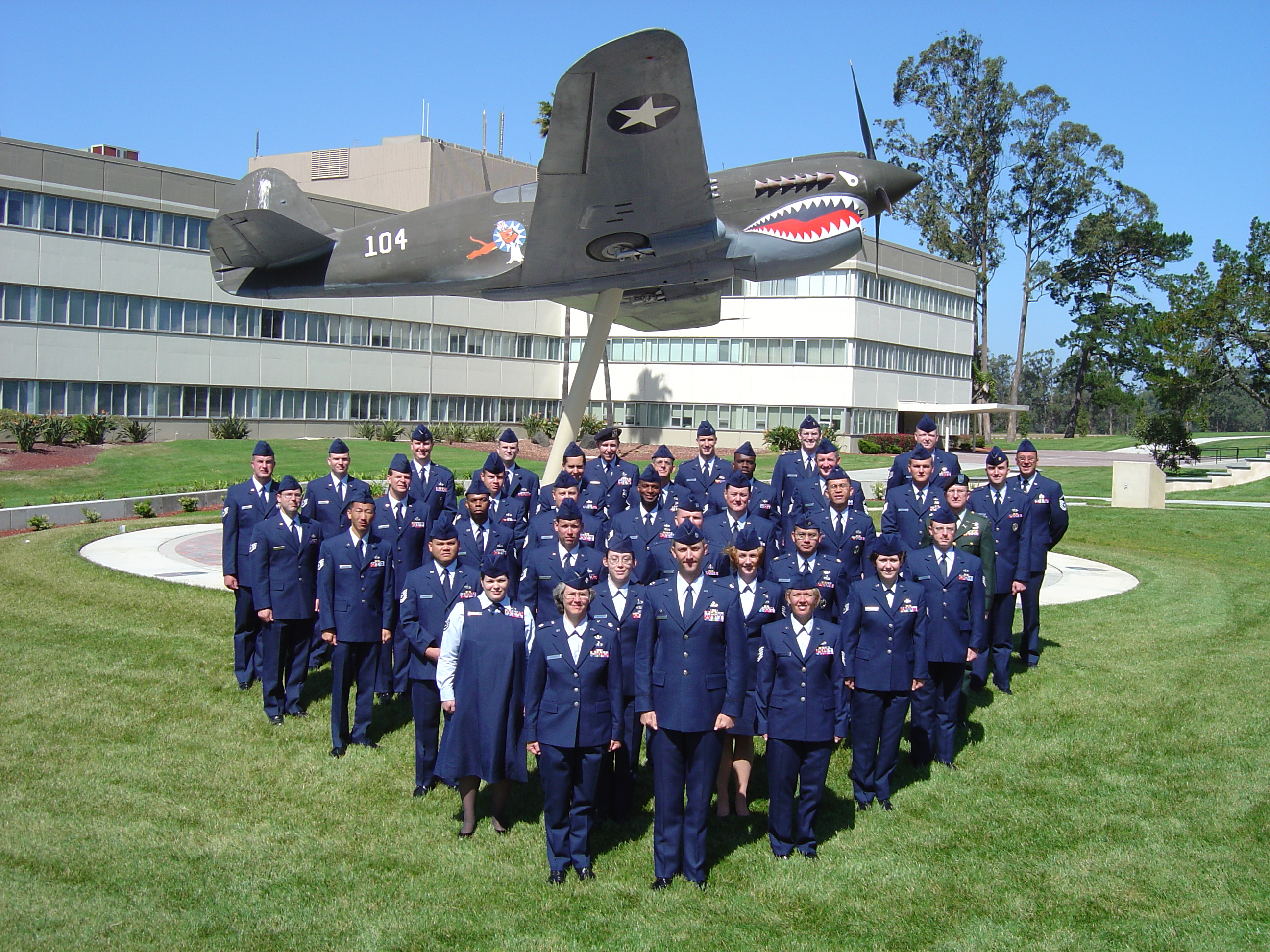
614 SOPS (May 2004)
