= LeMay Center for Doctrine Development and Education =

- Active: August 2007 - Present
- Country: United States
- Branch: United States Air Force
- Garrison/HQ: Maxwell Air Force Base, Alabama

Insignia
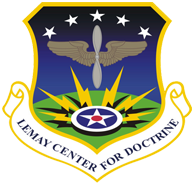
- Identification symbol

The Curtis E. LeMay Center for Doctrine Development and Education (LeMay Center) is a branch of the United States Air Force. It was formed in 2007 at the Maxwell Air Force Base in Alabama.

== History ==
In August 1996, the Air Force Chief of Staff consolidated all Air Force doctrine development under a single authority, the Headquarters Air Force Doctrine Center (HQAFDC). To emphasize the importance of doctrine, General Ronald E. Fogleman established HQ AFDC as a direct reporting unit reporting directly to him to better increase the Air Force's understanding of airpower doctrine by having a single and very clear voice for the Air Force on all doctrine matters. Major General Ronald E. Keys, the first HQ AFDC commander, set up the new center at Maxwell AFB, Alabama in 1997.

HQ AFDC was a Direct Reporting Unit (DRU) to the Chief of Staff of the United States Air Force. HQ AFDC was merged in 2007 with the College for Aerospace Doctrine, Research and Education Center. The new organization was initially known as the Air Force Doctrine Development and Education Center, but was shortly renamed as the Curtis E. LeMay Center for Doctrine Development and Education the LeMay Center under Air University in honor of late Air Force Chief of Staff Curtis E. LeMay. News

== Operations ==
The center researches, develops, and produces Air Force basic and operational doctrine, as well as joint and multinational doctrine. It coordinates with the major commands on their development of tactical doctrine, and assists other Services' doctrinal development efforts. The LeMay Center is responsible for reviewing the application of doctrine education in the continuum of education for all Air Force personnel, and is an advocate for the doctrinally correct representation of air, space, and cyberspace power in key Air Force, other Service, and joint exercises and experiments. The center participates in Air Force and other Services' joint wargames and key exercises to ensure scenarios provide a realistic depiction of the uses and impact of airpower.

== Lineage and honors ==
The center has a staff of over 300 active-duty members, reservists, military civilians, and contractors. The organization consists of five directorates at the headquarters; an air staff liaison at the Pentagon; and the Joint Integration Directorate located at Fort Leavenworth, Kansas.

=== List of commanders ===
The commander reports directly to the Chief of Staff of the Air Force for matters pertaining to doctrine. The officeholder also serves as the deputy commander of the Air University.

- Maj Gen Bentley B. Rayburn, July 2004
- Maj Gen Stephen J. Miller, June 2008 - Jan 2010
- Maj Gen David S. Fadok, July 2010 - July 2011
- Maj Gen Thomas K. Andersen, July 2011 - Jan 2013
- Maj Gen Walter D. Givhan, January 2013 - Dec 2013
- Col John Groff Dec 2013- Feb 2014 (acting)
- Maj Gen Steven L. Kwast, February 2014 - Nov 2014
- Col Jill E. Singleton, Nov 2014 - June 2015 (acting)
- Maj Gen Timothy J. Leahy, June 2015 - August 2017
- Maj Gen Michael D. Rothstein August 2017- July 2019
- Maj Gen Brad M. Sullivan, July 2019–January 2021
- Maj Gen William G. Holt, May 2021 - July 2023
- Maj Gen Parker H. Wright, July 2023 - present

== Directorates and Operating Locations ==
The Doctrine Development Directorate researches, develops and produces Air Force basic and operational doctrine, as well as joint and multinational doctrine, spanning the full range of military operations. The directorate coordinates with the major commands on their development of tactical doctrine, and assists other Services' doctrinal development efforts. It conducts historical research to support doctrine development and service positions, and participates in developing and investigating future operational concepts, technologies, and strategies. The directorate also maintains awareness of future Air Force planning and establishes policy for executing the development of Air Force doctrine. The directorate consists of two subdirectorates: one that researches, produces, and disseminates Air Force doctrine, and one that represents the center and provides Air Force doctrinal advocacy in the joint arena. The latter also provides interface and liaison with other services' doctrine development activities and the Joint Warfighting Center, and participates in joint doctrine development.

The Wargaming Directorate conducts Professional Military Education (PME) wargames for Air University along with Title 10 and other wargames for the Air Force, and to maintain a state-of-the-art wargaming facility. Wargaming is used at Air University (AU) as a means of applying and reinforcing strategic, operational and tactical doctrine-based warfighting principles taught in officer and enlisted PME programs. Wargaming at AU also supports scenarios with a broader joint focus that contribute to the Process of Accreditation of Joint Education requirements, as well as supporting several foreign partners with wargames tailored for their particular learning objectives.

The Warfighting Education Directorate develops and implements doctrine-specific education for Air Force senior officers and senior mentors, and develops and provides professional continuing education to selected Air Force warfighters in preparation for their participation in wargames and exercises. The directorate offers doctrine-based resident courses to address Warfighters' needs throughout their careers. As part of its doctrine outreach effort, the directorate provides speakers to lecture on doctrine related topics.

The Intelligence Directorate provides intelligence, surveillance and reconnaissance (ISR) support and subject matter expertise for Air University (AU) and LeMay Center doctrine, education, and wargaming missions. It also operates the AU Special Security Office (SSO). The Director serves as the Senior Intelligence Officer for AU. The ISR Applications Division develops and coordinates Joint and Air Force ISR doctrine in support of the Doctrine Development Directorate as well as provides scenarios/controllers, opposing forces expertise, and ISR education to wargames. The ISR Education Division prepares ISR curricula and provides instruction/expertise for AU across the joint air, space and cyberspace domains. The Security Division serves as the SSO, and manages the AU Sensitive Compartmented Information program. The Intelligence Directorate is supported by a team of senior Individual Mobilization Augmentees.

The Joint And Air Staff Liaisons provide the connection between the center, the Air Staff, and the Joint Staff on doctrine and related issues. They advocate the doctrinally correct representation of airpower in publications, models, and exercises, and oversees the Air and Joint Staff doctrine review processes. The liaisons also monitor the timely completion of all Air Staff and Joint Staff actions tasked to the center.

The Joint Integration Directorate supports Army doctrine development; provides Air Force support to TRADOC exercises, experiments, and wargames; and plans, prepares and presents Air Force instruction to Army personnel in basic qualification courses. The Joint Integration Directorate has operations locations at Fort Leavenworth, Fort Sill, Fort Benning, and Fort Rucker.

The Air University Press Directorate is the sole academic publisher for the United States Air Force. It publishes faculty and student research, textbooks, other materials relevant to the Air University program, school-selected student papers, faculty research efforts, textbooks, curriculum-related materials, the Air University Catalog, and other administrative documents that directly support AU's program of professional military education (PME). Among its series are Air War College's Maxwell Papers, Air Command and Staff College's Wright Flyers, theses by students at the School of Advanced Air and Space Studies (SAASS), and the College of Aerospace Doctrine, Research and Education's (CADRE) Papers. AU Press sponsors the Fairchild Papers, selected essays having research value to the Air Force. It also publishes the English, Spanish, Portuguese, Arabic, Chinese, and Africa-Francophonie editions of Air and Space Power Journal, the professional journal of the Air Force. Additionally, the Press publishes the distinguished Strategic Studies Quarterly journal, which focuses on issues related to national and international security.
