= Space Operations Center =

A Space Operations Center (SOC) is a facility such as a Mission Control Center for controlling spaceflight and/or spacelift missions, and may refer to:

- 614th Air and Space Operations Center, a U.S. Space Force operations center at Vandenberg AFB, California
- Air Force Satellite Control Facility, a former USAF structure with various SOCs (e.g. for the Corona satellite, GPS, etc.) at Onizuka AFS, California
- Combined Space Operations Center, a U.S. Space Command operations center at Vandenberg AFB
- European Space Operations Centre, a European Space Agency facility at Darmstadt, Germany
- Space Flight Operations Facility, a Jet Propulsion Laboratory facility in Pasadena, California
- Consolidated Space Operations Center, the development name for Falcon Air Force Station (now Schriever Air Force Base)
- Marshall Space Flight Center, a NASA facility at Huntsville, Alabama
