= 1st Expeditionary Space Control Squadron =

1st Expeditionary Space Control Squadron

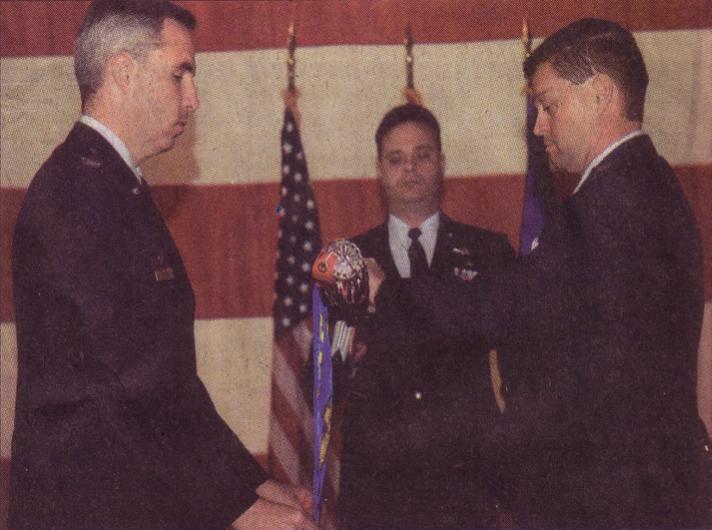
- The squadron guidon is furled during its inactivation ceremony, 9 June 2008
- Active: 1989-2008
- Country: United States
- Branch: United States Air Force
- Role: Space Control
- Part of: Air Force Space Command
- Motto: Vigilance Over Space
- Decorations: Air Force Outstanding Unit Award

Commanders
- Notable commanders: B. Chance Saltzman

Insignia
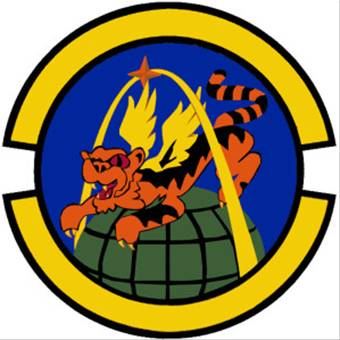
- 1st Expeditionary Space Control Squadron emblem (approved 15 November 1994)

The United States Air Force's 1st Expeditionary Space Control Squadron is a provisional squadron attached to the 21st Space Wing at Peterson Air Force Base, Colorado.

Before conversion to provisional status, the 1st Space Control Squadron' was a space situational awareness unit last located at Vandenberg Air Force Base, California. The squadron commanded the United States Space Surveillance Network to detect, track, identify and catalog positional data for all human-made objects in Earth orbit. The squadron was established in 1989 as the 1st Command and Control Squadron at Cheyenne Mountain Air Force Base, Colorado. It was inactivated in 2008 and its personnel and equipment were integrated into the 614th Air and Space Operations Center.

== History ==
=== Background ===
The roots of the squadron can be traced to 1961, when the Space Detection and Tracking System Center at opened at Ent Air Force Base, Colorado. The center brought together Air Force and Navy systems designed to track objects in space in all directions, not merely Soviet missiles launched over the North Pole. The center came under the operational control of North American Air Defense Command. There were several subsequent moves, name changes, and changes in personnel, experience, and equipment.

=== Activation ===
The Air Force activated the 1st Command and Control Squadron at Cheyenne Mountain Air Force Station, Colorado in December 1989 to operate the system. The 1st Command and Control Squadron provided collision avoidance support during each shuttle mission as well as maintaining an extensive satellite catalog (the "SATCAT" or "Box score"). This catalog is used by U.S. civilian and military agencies when launching new satellites into space, as well as by U.S. allies.

The 1 SPCS tracked and compiled positional data on thousands of man-made objects in space partly to prevent collisions between newly launched satellites and other objects already orbiting the Earth. Additionally, the unit had the mission to task 30 space sensors within Space Surveillance Network to track satellites for US Strategic Command (USSTRATCOM) to maintain an accurate satellite catalog (SATCAT) of over 9000 objects orbiting the Earth., To support crewed space flight, 1 SPCS constructs a theoretical box around the Space Shuttle, MIR or ISS, and projects flight path intersections for 36 to 72 hours. If any objects intersects the theoretical box, the unit forwarded the analysis to NASA, allowing them to determine whether to change the spacecraft/space station's flight path. Based on 1 SPCS mission analysis, and its predecessor units, NASA has moved the Space Shuttle 12 times and the International Space Station five times since 1981. In June 1995, the unit tracked the U.S. Space Shuttle Atlantis during its historic rendezvous with the Russian space station Mir. The unit also compiled a catalog of space objects.

The 1 SPCS also contained international personnel, such as Canadian military, since SSA was not just a U.S. problem.

=== Move ===
In 2006, Admiral Timothy Keating, commander of NORAD directed a study on the continued use of the hardened command post at Cheyenne Mountain in view of what was perceived as diminished threats. The decision to close Cheyenne Mountain required a unit move. The unit moved to Vandenberg Air Force Base, California in 2007 to better coordinate activities with the Joint Space Operations Center, it lost over 150 years of expert civilian experience.

=== Inactivation ===
The unit was inactivated on 9 Jun 2008, and its mission and members integrated into the 614th Air and Space Operations Center / Joint Space Operations Center. Unconfirmed sources state that Cheyenne Mountain may retain some capability to cover the 1 SPCS mission, if required.

== Lineage ==
- Constituted as the 1st Command and Control Squadron on 30 November 1989

Activated on 1 December 1989
Redesignated 1st Space Control Squadron on 1 October 2001
Inactivated c. 9 June 2008

- Redesignated 1st Expeditionary Space Control Squadron and converted to provisional status on 11 February 2009

Activated 27 February 2009

=== Assignments ===
- 1st Space Wing, 1 December 1989
- 73d Space Surveillance Group (later 73d Space Group), 28 February 1992
- 721st Space Group, 24 June 1994
- 21st Operations Group, 26 April 1995 – c. 9 June 2008
- Air Force Space Command to activate or inactivate as needed, 11 February 2009

Attached to 21st Space Wing, 27 February 2009

=== Stations ===
- Cheyenne Mountain Air Force Base (later Cheyenne Mountain Air Station, Cheyenne Mountain Air Force Station), Colorado, 1 December 1989
- Vandenberg Air Force Base, California, 31 July 2007 – 9 June 2008
- Peterson Air Force Base, Colorado, 27 February 2009 – present

=== Commanders ===
- Lt David Agee (1989–1991)
- Lt Col Joseph Wysocki (1991–1992)
- Lt Col John M. Rabins (1992–1994)
- Lt Col Michael A. Muolo (1994–1996)
- Lt Col Joseph G. Baillargeon (1996–1998)
- Lt Col David A. Strand (14 Aug 1998-2000)
- Lt Col Craigen B. Anderson (2000-2002)
- Lt. Col. Scott F. Shepherd (2002–2004)
- Lt Col Michael Mason (circa 2007),
- Lt Col Chance Saltzman (July 2007-2008)

=== Awards ===
Award streamer	Award	Dates	Notes
	Air Force Outstanding Unit Award	1 December 1989-31 August 1991	1st Command and Control Squadron
	Air Force Outstanding Unit Award	1 October 1995-30 September 1997	1st Command and Control Squadron
	Air Force Outstanding Unit Award	1 January 1998-31 December 1998	1st Command and Control Squadron
	Air Force Outstanding Unit Award	1 October 1997-30 September 1999	1st Command and Control Squadron
	Air Force Outstanding Unit Award	1 January 1999-31 December 1999	1st Command and Control Squadron
	Air Force Outstanding Unit Award	1 January 2000-31 August 2001	1st Command and Control Squadron
	Air Force Outstanding Unit Award	1 October 2004-30 September 2005	1st Space Control Squadron
	Air Force Outstanding Unit Award	1 October 2005-30 September 2006	1st Space Control Squadron
	Air Force Outstanding Unit Award	1 October 2006-30 July 2007	1st Space Control Squadron
	Air Force Outstanding Unit Award	31 July 2007-9 June 2008	1st Space Control Squadron

== See also ==
- Space Surveillance Network
- Midcourse Space Experiment
- Air Force Space Command
- Fourteenth Air Force
