= Cary C. Chun =

United States Air Force general

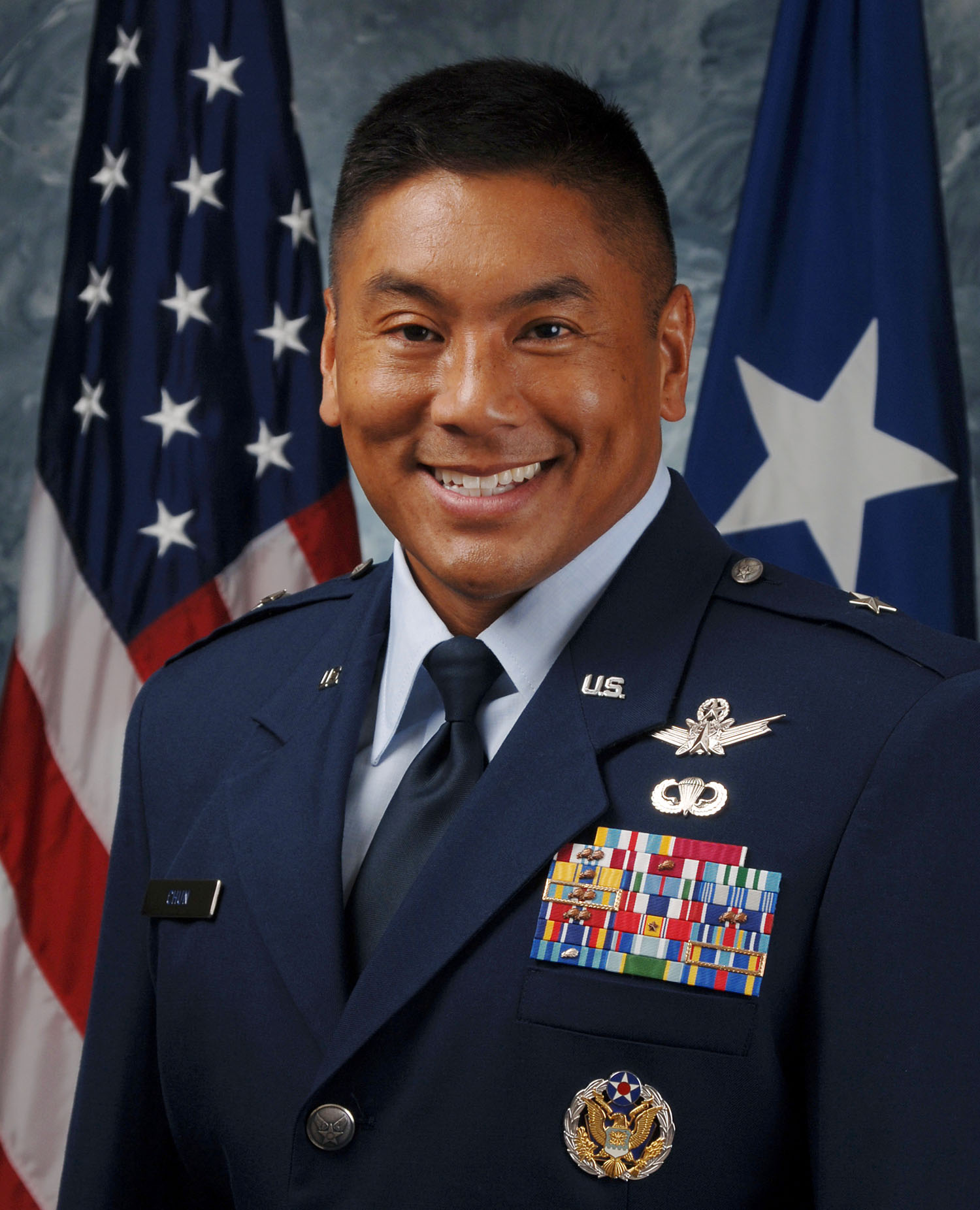
- Born: August 23, 1963 (age 63); Cavite, Philippines
- Military career
- Allegiance: United States
- Branch: United States Air Force
- Service years: 1985–2012
- Rank: Brigadier general
- Commands: 50th Space Wing; 614th Space Operations Squadron
- Awards: Defense Superior Service Medal (2); Legion of Merit

Brigadier General Cary C. Chun (born August 23, 1963) is a retired senior officer of the United States Air Force. He served as the Deputy Commander, Operations and Interagency Integration, Joint Functional Component Command for Space, United States Strategic Command (USSTRATCOM), and the Director for Mission Operations, National Reconnaissance Office. In this role, he led all Department of Defense space forces aligned with USSTRATCOM and provided tailored, responsive, local and global effects in support of national, USSTRATCOM and combatant commander objectives. As Director for Mission Operations, he led operations for all NRO overhead reconnaissance systems, ground stations, operational communications, and the operations center used to conduct intelligence activities essential for the national security of the United States and its allies.

Chun is the first United States Air Force general of Filipino descent. He retired from the air force on August 1, 2012.

== Early life ==
Chun was born in Cavite, Philippines, at Sangley Point Naval Air Station, where his father was on active duty in the United States Coast Guard. He graduated from Amador Valley High School in 1981. He was commissioned as a second lieutenant from the United States Air Force Academy in 1985.

== Military career ==
Chun gained extensive space operations experience working with United States Space Command, Air Force Space Command, 14th Air Force, the National Reconnaissance Office and Central Air Forces. He is a graduate of the Space Warfare Center's Space Tactics School. Additionally, he has supported the President and First Lady as a White House social aide.

Chun commanded the 614th Space Operations Squadron at Vandenberg AFB, California; NRO Operations Group at Onizuka Air Force Station, California; Space Operations Wing at the Aerospace Data Facility, Buckley AFB, Colorado; and 50th Space Wing, Schriever AFB, Colorado. He has also served as the Director of Space Forces while deployed to Southwest Asia for operations Enduring Freedom and Iraqi Freedom.

== Education ==
- 1985 Bachelor of Science degree in operations research, U.S. Air Force Academy, Colorado Springs, Colorado
- 1987 Master of Science degree in systems management, University of Southern California, Los Angeles
- 1990 Master of Science degree in space operations, Air Force Institute of Technology, Wright-Patterson AFB, Ohio
- 1991 Distinguished graduate, Squadron Officer School, Maxwell AFB, Alabama
- 1996 Distinguished graduate, Space Tactics School, Space Warfare Center, Schriever AFB, Colorado
- 1997 Air Command and Staff College, Maxwell AFB, Alabama
- 1998 Armed Forces Staff College, Norfolk, Virginia
- 2003 Master of Strategic Studies degree, Air War College, Maxwell AFB, Alabama
- 2006 Leadership Development, Center for Creative Leadership, Greensboro, North Carolina
- 2007 Enterprise Leadership Seminar, Kenan-Flagler School of Business, University of North Carolina at Chapel Hill
- 2008 Senior Executive Fellow, John F. Kennedy School of Government, Harvard University, Cambridge, Massachusetts

== Assignments ==
- May 1985 – August 1987, contract manager, Satellite Control Network Activation, Onizuka Air Force Station, California
- August 1987 – May 1989, Operations Director, Special Programs Division, Onizuka AFS, California
- May 1989 – December 1990, student, Air Force Institute of Technology, Wright-Patterson AFB, Ohio
- January 1991 – June 1992, chief of Systems Analysis Branch, Los Angeles AFB, California
- June 1992 – August 1993, chief of Integration, Test and Operations Division, Los Angeles AFB, California
- August 1993 – September 1994, program manager for advanced tactical applications, Fort Myer, Virginia
- September 1994 – January 1996, executive officer, National Reconnaissance Office, Washington, D.C.
- January 1996 – June 1996, student, Space Tactics School, Space Warfare Center, Schriever AFB, Colorado
- August 1996 – June 1997, student, Air Command and Staff College, Maxwell AFB, Alabama
- June 1997 – June 1999, chief of Special Operations Section, Cheyenne Mountain Air Station, Colorado
- June 1999 – May 2000, operations officer, 76th Space Operations Squadron, Schriever AFB, Colorado
- May 2000 – June 2002, commander of 614th Space Operations Squadron, Vandenberg AFB, California
- July 2002 – June 2003, student, Air War College, Maxwell AFB, Alabama
- June 2003 – June 2005, commander of Operations Group, National Reconnaissance Office, Onizuka AFS, California
- July 2005 – August 2007, commander of Space Operations Wing, Aerospace Data Facility, Buckley AFB, Colorado
- January 2007 – June 2007, director of Space Forces, Combined Air and Space Operations Center, Central Air Forces, Southwest Asia
- August 2007 – June 2008, executive officer to the commander of Air Force Space Command, Peterson AFB, Colorado
- June 2008 – September 2009, commander of 50th Space Wing, Schriever AFB, Colorado
- September 2009 – August 2012, deputy commander of operations and interagency integration, Joint Functional Component Command for Space, U.S. Strategic Command, and director for mission operations, National Reconnaissance Office, Chantilly, Virginia

== Achievements ==
=== Major awards and decorations ===
- Defense Superior Service Medal with oak leaf cluster
- Legion of Merit
- Defense Meritorious Service Medal with two oak leaf clusters
- Meritorious Service Medal with oak leaf cluster
- Joint Service Commendation Medal
- Air Force Commendation Medal with oak leaf cluster
- Joint Service Achievement Medal
- Air Force Achievement Medal

=== Other ===
- 1991, Outstanding squadron graduate, Squadron Officer School
- 1997, Top 25 percent graduate, Air Command and Staff College
- 2000, Field Grade Officer of the Year, California Air Force Association
- 2005, National Reconnaissance Office Leadership Award
- 2006, Office of the Secretary of the Air Force Leadership Award
- 2007, National Security Agency Bronze Medallion
- 2007, National Reconnaissance Office Gold Medal

Military offices
Preceded by ???	Commander of Aerospace Data Facility-Colorado; 2005–2007	Succeeded by David D. Thompson
Preceded by Teresa A. H. Djuric	Commander of the 50th Space Wing; 2008–2009	Succeeded by Wayne Monteith
Preceded by ???	Deputy Commander of the Joint Functional Component Command for Space; 2009–2012	Succeeded by Timothy R. Coffin
