= Space Futures Command =

Space Futures Command is a planned United States Space Force field command that forecasts the threat environment, develops and validates concepts, conducts experimentation and wargames, and performs mission area design.

The establishment of Space Futures Command was announced on 12 February 2024. It will be composed of the Space Warfighting Analysis Center, Concepts and Technology Center, and Wargaming Center. According to General B. Chance Saltzman, the field command would ensure competitiveness over time and couple mission needs with capability development.

== History ==
In September 2022, Secretary of the Air Force Frank Kendall III initiated an assessment of how the Department of the Air Force is organized with an eye towards preparing the Air Force and Space Force for a potential conflict with China. On February 12, 2024, these changes were announced, including the creation of Space Futures Command. According to General B. Chance Saltzman, initial mission analysis will be done by a small team to plan its establishment. He hopes that by the end of 2024, the two new centers will be established and, by 2025, there would be a decision for the command's leadership and headquarters.

Lieutenant General Shawn Bratton, who led the standup of Space Training and Readiness Command, was tasked to lead a task force of 10-15 people to work the Department of Defense requirements to establish SFC.
