= Space Delta 5 =

U.S. Space Force command and control unit

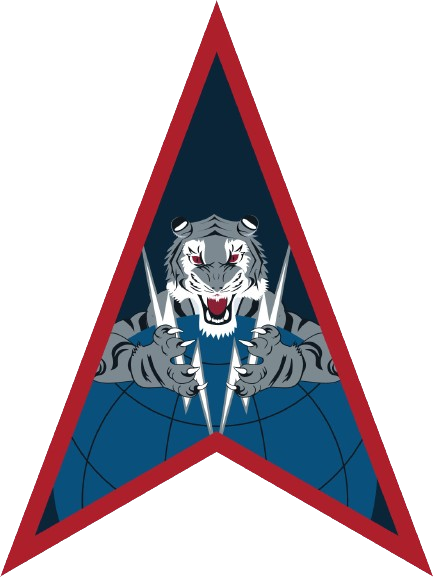
- Emblem of Space Delta 5
- Founded: 24 July 2020; 5 years ago
- Country: United States
- Branch: United States Space Force
- Type: Delta
- Role: Command and control
- Part of: United States Space Forces – Space
- Headquarters: Vandenberg Space Force Base, California, U.S.

Commanders
- Commander: Col Samuel R. Oppelaar II
- Senior Enlisted Leader: CMSgt Shannan K. Sanchez

Insignia
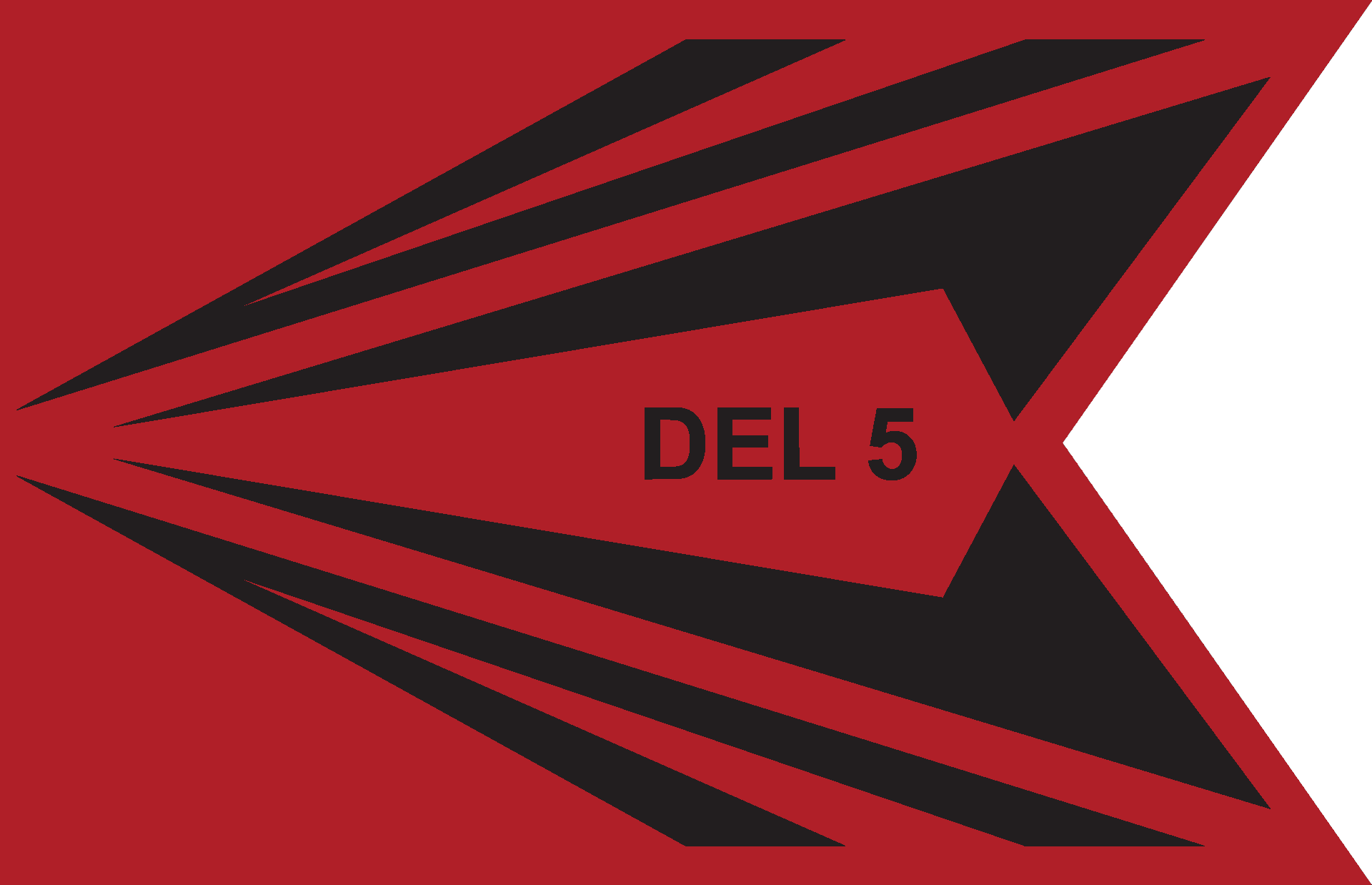
- Guidon

Space Delta 5 (DEL 5) is a United States Space Force unit responsible for preparing, presenting, and fighting assigned and attached forces for the purpose of conducting operational-level command and control (C2) of space forces to achieve theater and global objectives. It provides the majority of the forces and the structure for the Combined Space Operations Center. Activated on 24 July 2020, the delta is headquartered at Vandenberg Space Force Base, California. Its current commander is Colonel Phillip A. Verroco.

It was based upon the previous 614th Air Operations Center, the previous 14th Air Force operations center.

In lineage terms, the delta was established as the 614 Space Operations Group on 1 Aug 1998; activated on 28 August 1998; redesignated as 614 Air and Space Operations Center on 24 May 2007; 614 Air Operations Center on 1 Dec 2014; and then Space Delta 5 on 24 July 2020. It was transferred from the United States Air Force to the United States Space Force on 21 October 2020.

== Structure ==
Emblem	Name	Function	Headquarters
Divisions
	Combat Operations Division	Space forces Command and control	Vandenberg Space Force Base, California
SPD Patch	Strategy and Plans Division	Strategy and plans development	Vandenberg Space Force Base, California
Intelligence, Surveillance, and Reconnaissance Division		Intelligence, surveillance, and reconnaissance	Vandenberg Space Force Base, California
	Satellite Communications Integrated Operations Division	Satellite communications integration	Vandenberg Space Force Base, California
	Joint Fires and Information Operations Team		Vandenberg Space Force Base, California

== List of commanders ==
No.	Commander		Term			Ref
No.	Portrait	Name	Took office	Left office	Duration	Ref
1	Monique C. DeLauter	Colonel; Monique C. DeLauter	24 July 2020	24 May 2022	1 year, 304 days	
2	Phillip Verroco	Colonel; Phillip Verroco	24 May 2022	3 July 2024	2 years, 40 days	
3	Justin E. Sorice	Colonel; Justin E. Sorice	3 July 2024	19 June 2026	1 year, 351 days	
4	Samuel R. Oppelaar II	Colonel; Samuel R. Oppelaar II	19 June 2026	Incumbent	1 day	-
