= 614th Space Intelligence Squadron =

- Active: 19?? – 18 June 2007
- Country: United States
- Branch: United States Air Force
- Part of: USAF Squadron
- Garrison/HQ: Vandenberg Air Force Base

The United States Air Force's 614th Space Intelligence Squadron was a unit located at Vandenberg AFB, California. It was inactivated on 18 June 2007 when the 614th Space Operations Group was redesignated the 614 Air and Space Operations Center. The 614th Space Intelligence Squadron was formed on November 22, 2003 and assigned to Vandenberg Air Force Base. The purpose of this squadron was to defend navigation, weather, communications and missile warning satellites from enemy attacks in space and on the ground.

== Mission ==
The 614th Space Intelligence Squadron is the first squadron in the USAF that has been designed to protect satellites belonging to the military. This squadron is stationed at Vandenberg Air Force Base.

Before the second invasion of Iraq, the space shuttle Endeavour used its radar to make a map of Iraq; this map was used to make targets for the invasion.

The 614th Space Intelligence Squadron has somewhere between 20 and 88 members. They are located in an existing headquarters building.

== Location ==
Vandenberg Air Force Base is located between San Francisco and Los Angeles on the "Central Coast". It is located on a 98,000-acre (400 km^{2}) site. The base is operated by Air Force Space Command's 30th Space Wing and has a spaceport. A spaceport is an installation for testing and launching spacecraft. The base, originally named Camp Cooke, was renamed Vandenberg Air Force Base in 1957 when the US Air Force took control of the site. Some of the duties upheld at the base include: responding to global contingencies, operating the Western Range and conducting and supporting missile and space launches.
