= Air and Space Power Journal =

Military science scholarly journal

Air & Space Power Journal
- Cover of the Fall 2020 issue

The Air & Space Power Journal was the name of the flagship journal of the Department of the United States Air Force from 2001 to 2021. The journal, now named Air & Space Operations Review, is a quarterly military science scholarly journal published by Air University Press, the academic publisher of the United States Air Force, in English. Due to budget cuts, the print version was temporarily suspended in 2022. Its website hosts electronic versions of all past publications. The journal is headquartered at Maxwell AFB in Montgomery, Alabama.

== History ==
The English language version was established in 1947. Previous names of the publication include Air University Quarterly Review, Aerospace Power Journal, Airpower Journal, and Air University Review. The Spanish edition was established in 1949. The French edition started in 2005. The Chinese language edition was established in 2007. Portuguese and Arabic editions were mothballed in 2013 due to widespread cuts in defense spending.

In 2018, the Mandarin edition was replaced by the English-language The Air Force Journal of Indo-Pacific Affairs (JIPA).
