= NGC 614 =

Lenticular galaxy

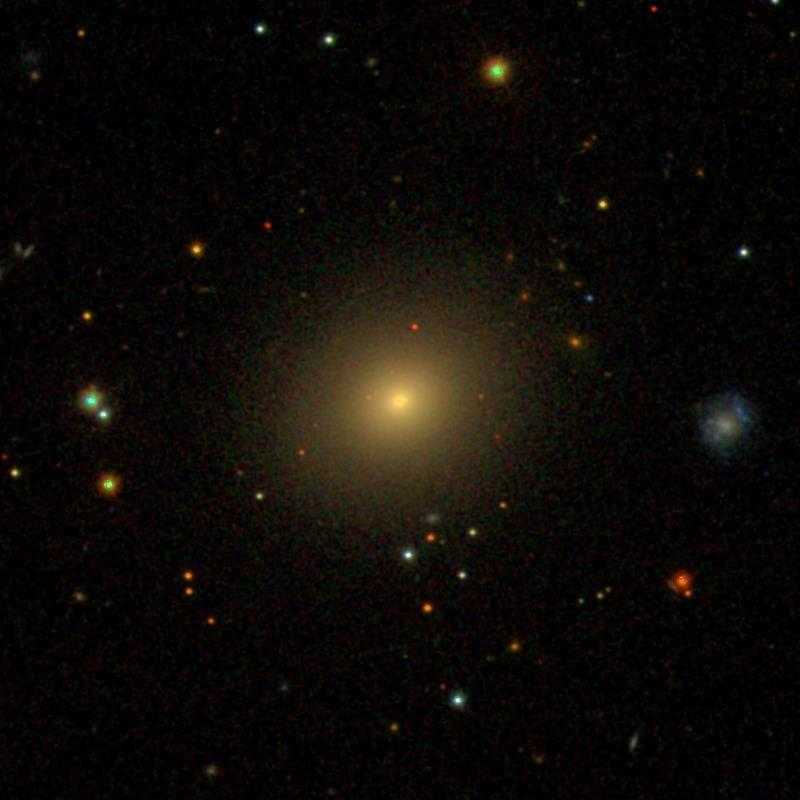

Observation data (J2000 epoch)
- Constellation: Triangulum
- Right ascension: 01^{h} 35^{m} 52.2^{s}
- Declination: +33° 40′ 55.1″
- Heliocentric radial velocity: 5,059 km/s
- Distance: 222.6 Mly (68.26 Mpc)

Characteristics
- Type: SO

Other designations
- NGC 614, UGC 1140, LEDA 5933, MCG +05-04-075

NGC 614 is a lenticular galaxy in the constellation Triangulum about 223 million light-years from the Milky Way. It is forming a pair with NGC 608. It was discovered on September 13, 1784 by the astronomer William Herschel.
