= Teresa A. H. Djuric =

United States Air Force general

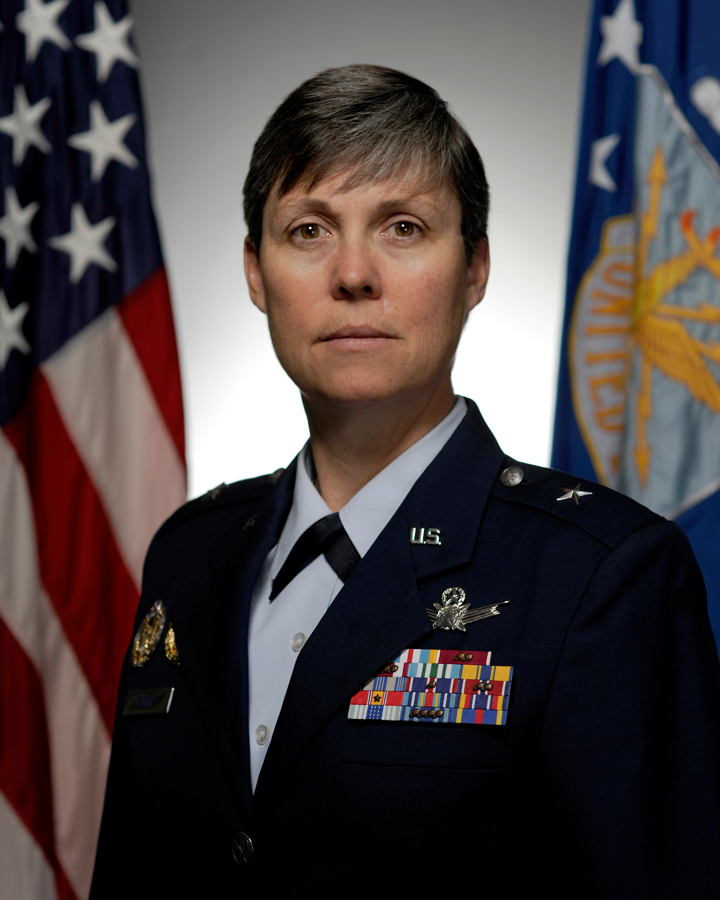
- Brigadier General Teresa Djuric in 2013
- Military career
- Allegiance: United States
- Branch: United States Air Force
- Service years: 1983–2013
- Rank: Brigadier general
- Commands: Jeanne M. Holm Center for Officer Accessions and Citizen Development; 50th Space Wing; 21st Operations Group; 614th Space Operations Squadron
- Conflicts: War in Afghanistan; Iraq War
- Awards: Air Force Distinguished Service Medal; Defense Superior Service Medal; Legion of Merit (3)

Teresa A.H. Djuric is a retired United States Air Force brigadier general. Her last assignment was deputy director, Space and Intelligence Office, Office of the Under Secretary of Defense for Acquisition, Technology and Logistics, The Pentagon, Washington, D.C.

== Military career ==
Teresa Anne Hudachek Djuric is the daughter of U.S. Army Major General John W. Hudachek and Anne (Hamilton) Hudachek. She was commissioned in 1983 through Officer Training School. She has operated space systems at three space wings and Headquarters 14th Air Force. In 2004, she deployed to Southwest Asia as director of space forces for operations Enduring Freedom and Iraqi Freedom. She has commanded at the squadron, group and wing levels, and has served on staffs at the Air Force Personnel Center, United States Strategic Command and Headquarters United States Air Force. Prior to her final assignment, she was Commander, Jeanne M. Holm Center for Officer Accessions and Citizen Development, Maxwell Air Force Base, Alabama.

== Post-retirement ==
Djuric is the commandant of cadets for the Virginia Women's Institute for Leadership (VWIL) and special assistant to the president at Mary Baldwin College, effective October 1, 2013.

== Education ==
1983 Bachelor of Science degree in computer science, University of Mary Washington, Fredericksburg, Virginia
1983 Officer Training School, Lackland Air Force Base, Texas
1987 Squadron Officer School, Maxwell Air Force Base, Alabama
1994 Master of Arts degree in Curriculum & Instruction, University of Colorado, Colorado Springs, Colorado
1996 Air Command and Staff College, Maxwell Air Force Base, Alabama
1999 Air War College, by correspondence
2001 Master of Strategic Studies degree, Army War College, Carlisle Barracks, Carlisle, Pennsylvania
2006 Joint and Combined Warfighting School, Joint Forces Staff College, Norfolk, Virginia

== Assignments ==
- October 1983 – August 1987, satellite operations officer, North American Aerospace Defense Command, Cheyenne Mountain Air Force Station, Colorado
- August 1987 – November 1988, crew commander, 5th Space Warning Squadron, Woomera, South Australia
- November 1988 – January 1992, flight commander, Squadron Officer School, Maxwell Air Force Base, Alabama
- January 1992 – May 1994, section commander, 21st Crew Training Squadron, Peterson Air Force Base, Colorado
- May 1994 – August 1995, flight commander, 21st Operations Support Squadron, Peterson Air Force Base, Colorado
- July 1995 – June 1996, student, Air Command and Staff College, Maxwell Air Force Base, Alabama
- June 1996 – March 1998, section chief, division chief and executive officer, Assignments Directorate, Air Force Personnel Command, Randolph Air Force Base, Texas
- March 1998 – June 2000, commander, 614th Space Operations Squadron, Vandenberg Air Force Base, California
- June 2000 – June 2001, student, Army War College, Carlisle Barracks, Pennsylvania
- July 2001 – June 2003, U.S. Strategic Command representative to U.S. Pacific Command, Camp H.M. Smith, Hawaii
- June 2003 – May 2005, commander, 21st Operations Group, Peterson Air Force Base, Colorado (April 2004 – August 2004, director of space forces, U.S. Central Command Air Forces, Southwest Asia)
- May 2005 – September 2006, chief, Space Superiority Division, Deputy Chief of Staff for Strategic Plans and Programs, Headquarters U.S. Air Force, Washington, D.C.
- September 2006 – May 2007, vice commander, 30th Space Wing, Vandenberg Air Force Base, California
- May 2007 – June 2008, commander, 50th Space Wing, Schriever Air Force Base, Colorado
- June 2008 – October 2010, commander, Jeanne M. Holm Center for Officer Accessions and Citizen Development, Maxwell Air Force Base, Alabama
- October 2010 – September 2013, deputy director, Space and Intelligence Office, Office of the Under Secretary of Defense for Acquisition, Technology and Logistics, The Pentagon, Washington, D.C.

== Awards and decorations ==
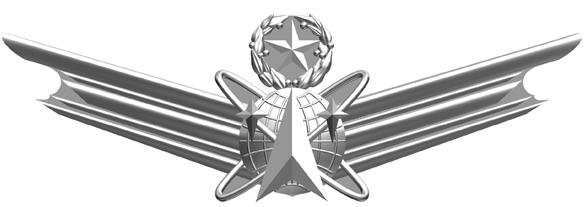
| Command Space Badge |
| Headquarters Air Force Badge |
| Office of the Secretary of Defense Identification Badge |

| Air Force Distinguished Service Medal |
| Defense Superior Service Medal |
| Legion of Merit with two bronze oak leaf clusters |
| Meritorious Service Medal with four bronze oak leaf clusters |
| Joint Service Commendation Medal |
| Air Force Commendation Medal |
| Air Force Achievement Medal |
| Air Force Outstanding Unit Award with bronze oak leaf cluster |
| Air Force Organizational Excellence Award with two bronze oak leaf clusters |
| National Defense Service Medal with bronze service star |
| Global War on Terrorism Expeditionary Medal |
| Global War on Terrorism Service Medal |
| Air Force Overseas Short Tour Service Ribbon |
| Air Force Expeditionary Service Ribbon with gold frame |
| Air Force Longevity Service Award with silver and bronze oak leaf clusters |
| Air Force Training Ribbon |

=== Other achievements ===
2005 Gen. Jerome O'Malley Distinguished Space Leadership Award

== Effective dates of promotion ==
| Insignia | Rank | Date |
|---|---|---|
| | Brigadier general | December 9, 2008 |
| | Colonel | August 1, 2002 |
| | Lieutenant colonel | September 1, 1998 |
| | Major | October 1, 1995 |
| | Captain | September 30, 1987 |
| | First lieutenant | September 30, 1985 |
| | Second lieutenant | September 30, 1983 |
