= USS Margaret O =

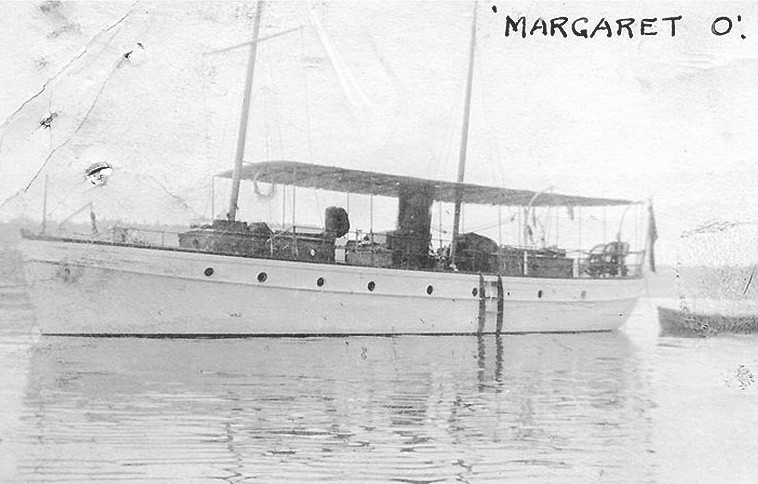
- Margaret O (American Motor Boat, 1915) photographed prior to World War I.

History

United States
- Name: USS Margaret O
- Builder: George Lawley & Sons, Neponset, Massachusetts
- Laid down: date unknown
- Completed: 1915 at Neponset, Massachusetts
- Acquired: leased by the Navy on 2 October 1917
- Commissioned: 2 October 1917 as USS Margaret O (SP-614)
- Decommissioned: c. 1919
- Renamed: USS SP-614 in April 1918
- Stricken: c. 1919
- Fate: Returned to her owner on 24 April 1919

General characteristics
- Type: Motorboat
- Displacement: not known
- Length: 55 ft (17 m)
- Beam: not known
- Draft: not known
- Propulsion: not known
- Speed: not known
- Complement: not known
- Armament: not known

USS Margaret O (SP-614) was a civilian motorboat that temporarily served in the U.S. Navy during World War I. She was outfitted by the Navy as a patrol craft and patrolled on the U.S. East Coast. Post-war she was returned to her owner.

== Built in Massachusetts ==
Margaret O, a 55-foot motor pleasure boat, was built in 1915 at Neponset, Massachusetts, by George Lawley & Sons.

== World War I service ==
After being acquired by the Navy for World War I service she was placed in commission in October 1917 as USS Margaret O (SP-614). Her name was changed to SP-614 in April 1918. She was assigned section patrol use, presumably in New England waters.

== Post-war disposition ==
Post-war she was decommissioned and then returned to her owner in April 1919.
