= Strategic Studies Quarterly =

- Discipline: Military
- Language: English

Publication details
- History: 2007–2021
- Publisher: Air University Press
- Frequency: Quarterly

Standard abbreviations
- ISO 4: Strateg. Stud. Q.

Indexing
- ISSN: 1936-1815

Links
- Journal homepage

Strategic Studies Quarterly (2007–2021) was a quarterly peer-reviewed academic journal sponsored by the United States Air Force covering issues related to national and international security. Published by Air University Press, the SSQ explores strategic issues of current and continuing interest to the United States Department of Defense and US international partners. New editions are released on the first day of March, June, September, and December. In early 2017, the journal launched an online news talk show, "Issues and Answers," with interviews and discussion panels of United States Department of Defense subject matter experts and outside academics. The final issue of the journal was published in 2021, and Air University Press shortly thereafter inaugurated the new journal Æther: A Journal of Strategic Airpower & Spacepower.
