= Air University Press =

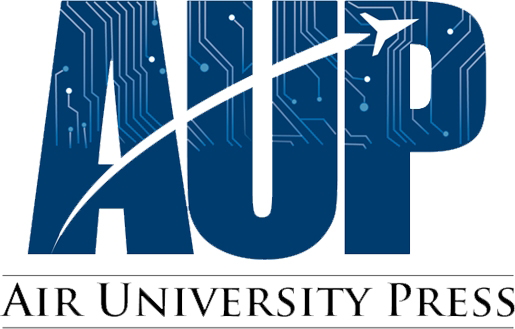
- Parent company: Air University
- Founded: 1953; 73 years ago
- Country of origin: United States
- Headquarters location: Maxwell Air Force Base, Alabama
- Publication types: Academic journals, books
- Official website: www.airuniversity.af.edu/AUPress/

Air University Press is a division of the Academic Services Directorate and housed under the Muir S. Fairchild Research Information Center of Air University, Maxwell AFB, Alabama. It publishes faculty and student research, academic journals, other materials relevant to the Air University program, school-selected student papers, faculty research efforts, and other documents that support AU's program of professional military education.

Among its paper series are Air War College's Maxwell Papers, Air Command and Staff College's Wright Flyers, the School of Advanced Air and Space Studies's Drew Papers, and the Fairchild, Walker, Chennault and Kenney series.

It also publishes Air and Space Power Journal, the professional journal of the Air Force. Additionally, the Press publishes the distinguished Strategic Studies Quarterly journal, which focuses on issues related to national and international security. Additionally, it publishes two regionally focused academic journals: the Journal of Indo-Pacific Affairs, and the Journal of the Americas.

Air University Press has been a member of the Association of University Presses since 2020.

Following a temporary offline period to ensure Executive Order compliance across its extensive backlist of books, journals, and paper series, Air University Press will relaunch with a rebranded and modernized website on April 21, 2025 and began releasing new books and journal issues on April 18, 2025. This update aligns with the Department of Defense and Department of the Air Force's renewed focus on warfighting effectiveness and lethality. The Press will now prioritize publications and submissions that support operational readiness and enhance strategic capabilities for the warfighter.

== See also ==
- List of English-language book publishing companies
- List of university presses
