= HMS Statesman =

Submarine of the Royal Navy

Coordinates: 11°40′N 92°45′E

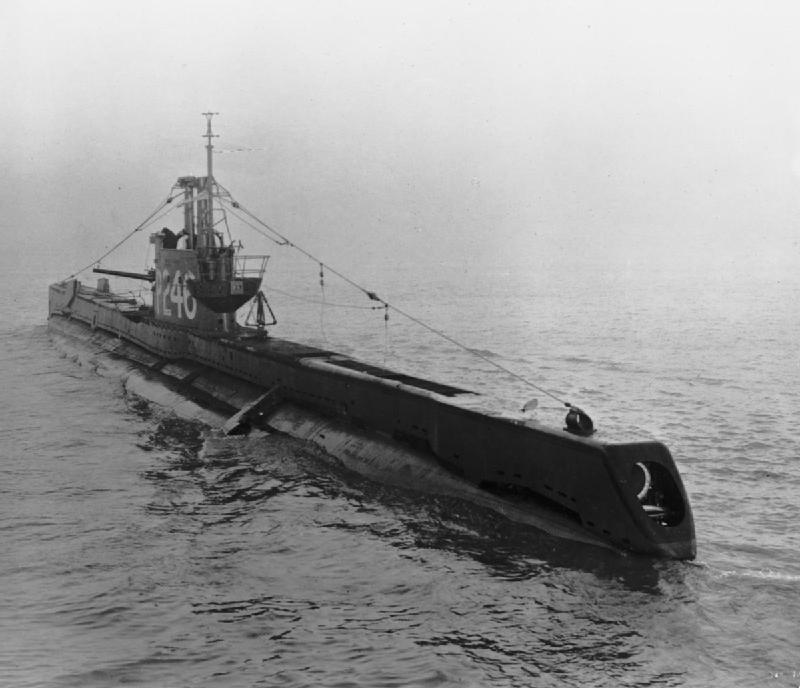
- HMS Statesman

History

United Kingdom
- Name: HMS Statesman
- Builder: Cammell Laird & Co Limited, Birkenhead
- Laid down: 2 November 1942
- Launched: 14 September 1943
- Commissioned: 13 December 1943
- Renamed: Sultane, 5 November 1959
- Reclassified: Lent to French Navy 1952
- Fate: Sold 3 January 1961
- Badge

General characteristics
- Class & type: S-class submarine
- Displacement: 814-872 tons surfaced; 990 tons submerged
- Length: 217 ft (66 m)
- Beam: 23 ft 6 in (7.16 m)
- Draught: 11 ft (3.4 m)
- Speed: 14.75 knots (27.32 km/h; 16.97 mph) surfaced; 8 knots (15 km/h; 9.2 mph) submerged
- Complement: 48
- Armament: 6 × forward 21 in (533 mm) torpedo tubes, one aft; 13 torpedoes; 1 × 3 in (76 mm) gun (QF 4 in gun on later boats); 1 × 20 mm cannon; 3 × .303-calibre machine guns

HMS Statesman (P246) was an S-class submarine of the Royal Navy, and part of the Third Group built of that class. She was built by Cammell Laird and launched on 14 September 1943. So far she has been the only ship of the Royal Navy to bear the name Statesman.

== Career ==
She spent the time between August 1944 and August 1945 with the Eastern Fleet, where she had an eventful career. She sank the Japanese army cargo ship Sugi Maru No.5 (the former Panamanian-flagged, Norwegian-owned Gran), twenty-five Japanese sailing vessels, the Japanese trawler Matsujima Maru No.3, four Japanese coasters, including Nippon Maru No.19, Nanyo Maru No. 17 and Nippon Maru No.14, a small Japanese tanker, five small unidentified Japanese vessels, ten small Japanese landing craft, three Japanese barges and a derelict wreck drifting in the Straits of Malacca, described as probably a coaster.

=== Sinking of Haguro ===
On 9 May 1945 the Japanese heavy cruiser Haguro and the Japanese destroyer Kamikaze left Singapore for a transport run to the Andaman Islands. They were sighted the next day in the Malacca Strait by Statesman and her sister, HMS Subtle. To intercept the Japanese ships, a task force made up of two battleships, one heavy cruiser, two light cruisers, four escort carriers and eight destroyers left Trincomalee. Aircraft from the escort carriers attacked the Nicobar Islands on 11 May, forcing Haguro and Kamikaze to head back to Singapore.

On 14 May the Japanese ships again departed Singapore for the Andaman Islands. They were spotted the next day northeast of Sabang by aircraft from the British escort carrier HMS Shah. A few hours later they were attacked by aircraft from the British escort carrier HMS Emperor, causing light damage to Haguro. In the meantime Japanese aircraft had sighted Allied destroyers closing in on Haguro and once again the Japanese ships reversed course.

In anticipation on the Japanese reversal of course, the commander of the British 26th Destroyer Flotilla, Captain M.L. Power, on board HMS Saumarez and the other British destroyers HMS Venus, HMS Verulam, HMS Vigilant and HMS Virago plotted a course to intercept the Japanese ships, which they did shortly before midnight on 15 May. After careful manoeuvering the destroyers began attacking the Japanese ships from all sides shortly after one o'clock the following day. Haguro was hit by torpedoes and gunfire and sank around 0230 hours, but not before she hit Saumarez with gunfire. The escorting Japanese destroyer Kamikaze escaped with only minor damage. It was during this operation that HMS Statesman put into Pangkor Laut, a small island in the Malacca Strait to retrieve Lt Col. Spencer Chapman, a British Army officer who had been operating behind Japanese lines since the invasion in 1942.

== Postwar ==
She survived the Second World War and was lent to the French Navy in 1952 who renamed her Sultane. She was returned on 5 November 1959 and was sold on 3 January 1961 to Pounds, of Portsmouth to be broken up. However, large parts of the vessel, including the conning tower, remained intact and these have since been restored and preserved as part of a private collection at Fort Southwick, Portsmouth.
