= Combined Space Operations Center =

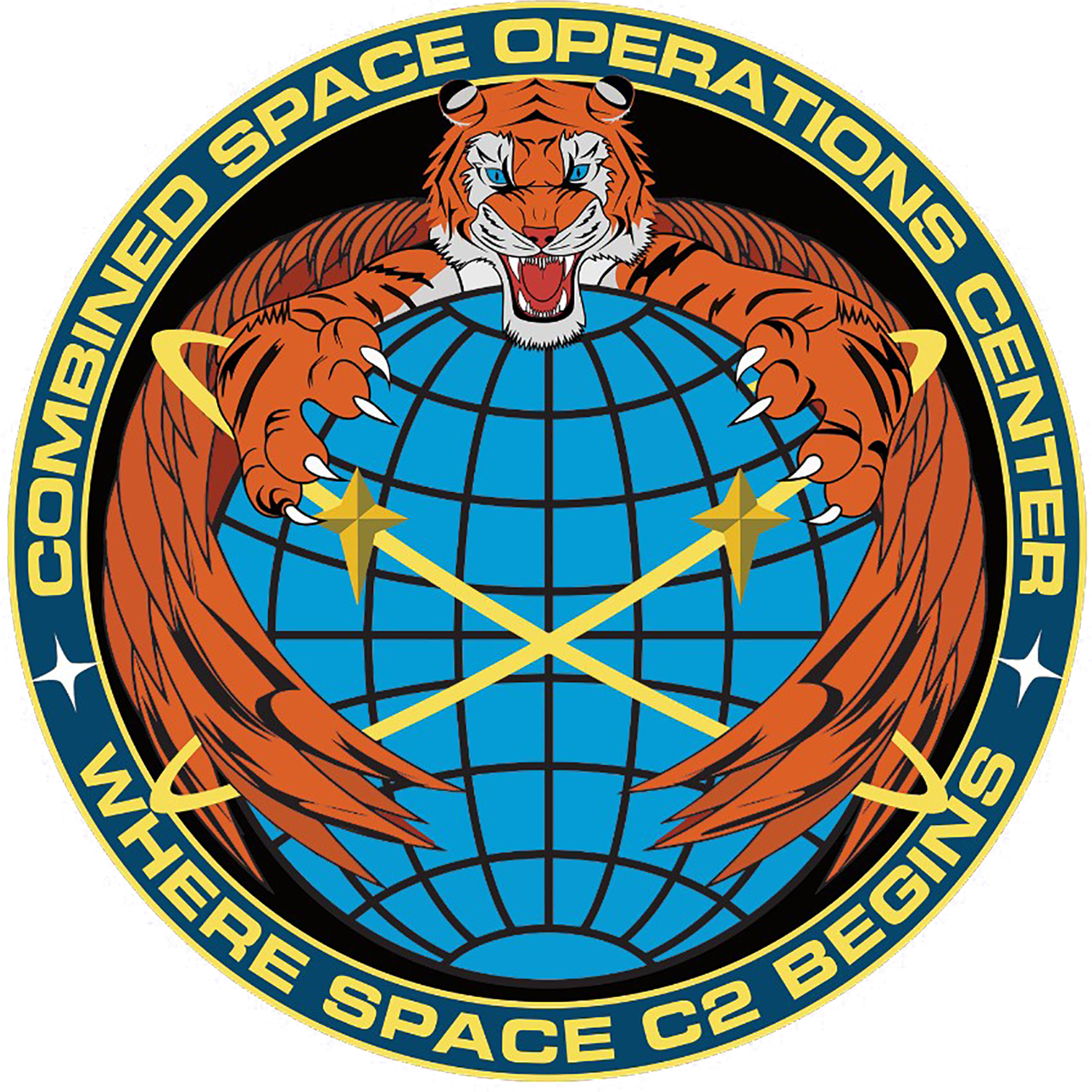
- CSpOC Seal
- Founded: 18 May 2005; 21 years, 4 months
- Country: United Kingdom; United States; Australia; Canada
- Type: Space operations center
- Role: Command and control
- Part of: United States Space Forces – Space
- Headquarters: Vandenberg Space Force Base, California, U.S.
- Mottos: Right Effect, Right Place, Right Time

Commanders
- Director: Col Phillip A. Verroco, USSF
- Deputy Director: GPCAPT Julien Greening, RAAF

The Combined Space Operations Center (CSpOC) is a U.S.–led multinational space operations center that provides command and control of space forces for the United States Space Command under the United States Space Force component field command United States Space Forces – Space. The CSpOC is located at Vandenberg Space Force Base.

== Mission ==
The mission of the Combined Space Operations Center is to "Execute operational command and control of space forces to achieve theater and global objectives."

== Structure ==
The Combined Space Operations Center is organized into six different elements:

1. Combat Operations Division (COD):The Combat Operations Division is responsible for executing the space tasking order and performing command and control of space forces.
2. Strategy and Plans Division (SPD):The Strategy and Plans Division creates the Joint Space Operations Plan (JSOP), the Space Operations Directive (SOD), Master Space Plan (MSP), Operational Assessments (OA), Combined Space Tasking Orders (CSTO), as well as any other special instructions and standards. It not only plans space operations, but also integrates air and cyber plans.
3. Intelligence,Surveillance,and Reconnaissance Division (ISRD):The Intelligence,Surveillance and Reconnaissance Division provides space intelligence to CSpOC elements.
4. 55th Combat Training Squadron (55 CTS):The 55th Combat Training Squadron provides advanced training, standardization and evaluation, weapons and tactics, system integration, exercise and experimentation, space weather, and special technical operations support functions for the CSpOC. Each of these functions correlate to a flight within the squadron.
5. 65th Cyber Squadron (65 CYS):The 65th Cyber Squadron provides communication support for the CSpOC.
6. Commercial Integration Cell (CIC):The Commercial Integration Cell integrates commercial space organizations, such as commercial satellite owners and operators, into the CSpOC, enabling greater communication between military and commercial space.

== History ==
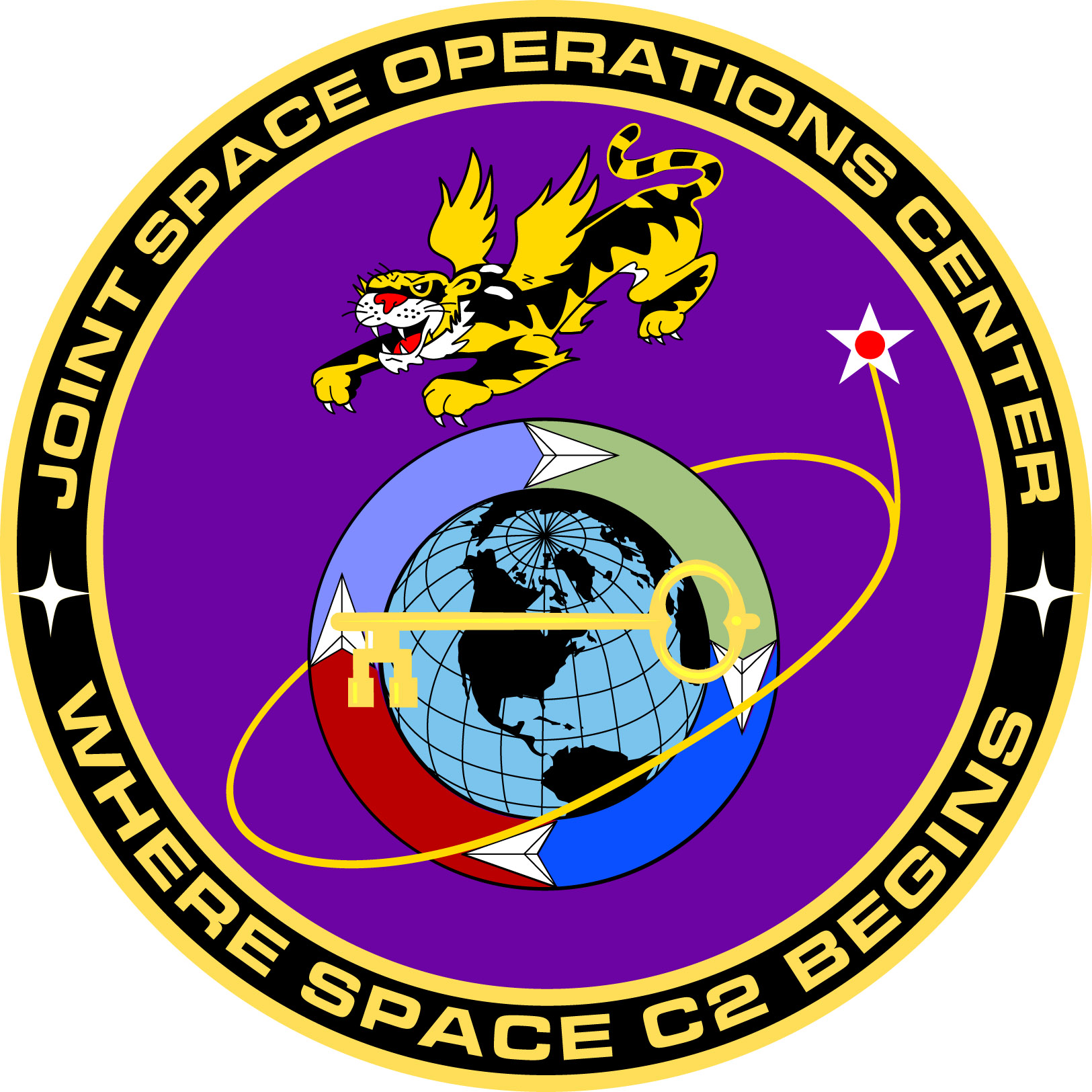
Joint Space Operations Center emblem

The Joint Space Operations Center (JSpOC) was initially established on 18 May 2005 to control all joint military space assets. It was organized under U.S. Strategic Command's Joint Force Space Component Commander. The core cadre of personnel from the Joint Space Operations Center was provided by the Air Force's 614th Air Operations Center (now Space Force's Space Delta 5), but other space personnel from the Army, Navy, and Marine Corps also were tasked to the JSpOC.

On 18 July 2018 it was redesignated as the Combined Space Operations Center, reorganizing to improve coordination between the United States and its allies, as well as between commercial and civil space organizations. The Combined Space Operations Center is a strategic defense partnership between the United States, Australia, Canada, and the United Kingdom. Other collaborating countries include France, Germany, and New Zealand.

== List of directors ==
- Col Scott D. Brodeur, 8 June 2018
- Col Monique C. DeLauter, 24 July 2020
- Col Phillip A. Verroco, 24 May 2022

== See also ==
- 614th Air Operations Center
