= 614th Air Operations Center =

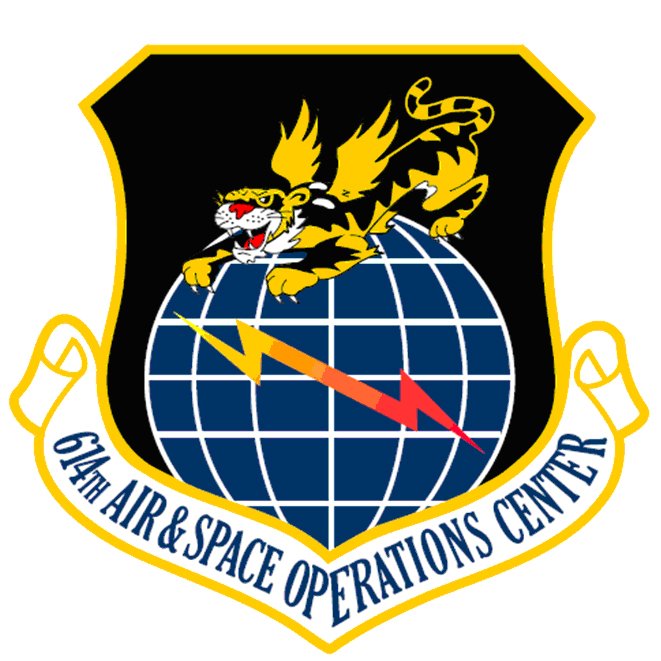
- 614th Air Operations Center shield
- Active: 1 August 1998–24 July 2020
- Country: United States
- Branch: United States Space Force
- Type: Space operations center
- Role: Command and control
- Part of: Space Operations Command
- Headquarters: Vandenberg Air Force Base, California, U.S.
- Decorations: Air Force Outstanding Unit Award Air Force Organization Excellence Award

The 614th Air Operations Center (614 AOC) was a space operations center of the United States Space Force's Space Operations Command. It served as the core of the Combined Space Operations Center, as well as serving as the Space Force's primary force provider to the CSpOC.

== History ==
Initially established on 1 August 1998, the 614th Space Operations Group conducted space operations as a part of Air Force Space Command's 14th Air Force. On 24 May 2007 it was redesignated as the 614th Air and Space Operations Center in alignment with the Component-Numbered Air Force structure. The 614th Space Intelligence Group, 614th Space Intelligence Squadron, and 614th Space Operations Squadron were all merged into the new Air and Space Operations Center. The 614th Air and Space Operations Center also served as the Air Force Space Command force provider to the Joint Space Operations Center. On 1 December 2014, the 614th Air and Space Operations Center was redesignated as the 614th Air Operations Center, continuing to serve as the primary Air Force Space Command provider to the Joint Space Operations Center. When the JSpOC was redesignated as the Combined Space Operations Center in 2018, the 614th AOC continued to support, later transitioning to the U.S. Space Force with the rest of Air Force Space Command on 20 December 2019.

On July 24, 2020, the 614 AOC was inactivated and redesignated as Space Delta 5.

== List of commanders ==
- Col Stephen N. Whiting, June 2006 – June 2008
- Col Dick Boltz
- Col Christopher Moss, 2010 – June 4, 2012
- Col John Wagner, June 4, 2012 – June 6, 2014
- Col John Giles, June 6, 2014 – June 30, 2016
- Col Michael Manor, June 30, 2016 – June 8, 2018
- Col Scott D. Brodeur, June 8, 2018 – July 24, 2020
- Col Monique C. DeLauter, July 24, 2020 – July 24, 2020
