= List of active duty United States Air Force major generals =

List of US Air Force major generals

U.S. Air Force major general insignia

U.S. Air Force rank insignia of a major general (service dress uniform)

The rank flag of a U.S. Air Force major general

This is a list of active duty United States Air Force major generals collected from publicly available and accessible information.

== Joint positions ==
=== Department of Defense ===
==== Office of the Secretary of Defense ====
Position insignia	Position	Part of	Photo	Incumbent	Service branch
California Air National Guard Defense Innovation Unit	Commander, California Air National Guard (CA ANG) and Military Deputy to the Secretary of Defense for the Defense Innovation Unit (DIU)	Office of the Secretary of Defense (OSD); California National Guard (CNG)		Major General; Steven J. Butow (Note: from the Air National Guard (ANG))	U.S. Air Force
Reserve Forces Policy Board	Military Executive and Senior Policy Advisor, Reserve Forces Policy Board (RFPB)	Office of the Secretary of Defense (OSD)		Major General; Vanessa J. E. Dornhoefer	U.S. Air Force
Office of the Under Secretary of Defense (Acquisition and Sustainment)	Director, Department of Defense Special Access Program Central Office (SAPCO)	Office of the Deputy Secretary of Defense; Office of the Under Secretary of Defense (Acquisition and Sustainment) (USD(A&S))		Major General; Derek J. O'Malley	U.S. Air Force
Office of the Assistant Secretary of Defense (Sustainment)	Executive Director, Joint Rapid Acquisition Cell (JRAC)	Office of the Assistant Secretary of Defense (Sustainment) (ASD(Sustainment))		Major General; Edward L. Vaughan	U.S. Air Force

==== National intelligence agencies ====
Position insignia	Position	Part of	Photo	Incumbent	Service branch
Central Security Service	Deputy Chief, Central Security Service (CSS)	Not applicable		Major General; Matteo G. Martemucci	U.S. Air Force
Defense Intelligence Agency	Military and Mobilization Assistant to the Director, Defense Intelligence Agency (DIA)	Not applicable		Major General; Robert I. Kinney	U.S. Air Force

==== Defense Agencies ====
Position insignia	Position	Part of	Photo	Incumbent	Service branch
Defense Health Agency	Director, Defense Health Network Central (DHN Central) and Commander, Medical Readiness Command – Alpha (MRC)	Defense Health Agency (DHA); U.S. Air Force Medical Service (AFMS)		Major General (Dr.); Thomas W. Harrell	U.S. Air Force
Defense Health Agency U.S. Air Force Medical Service	Director, Defense Health Network Continental (DHN Continental) and Commander, Medical Readiness Command – Bravo (MRC)	Defense Health Agency (DHA); U.S. Air Force Medical Service (AFMS)		Major General; Jeannine M. Ryder	U.S. Air Force
Defense Logistics Agency	Director, Logistics Operations (J-3), Defense Logistics Agency (DLA) and Commander, Joint Regional Combat Support, Defense Logistics Agency	Office of the Assistant Secretary of Defense (Sustainment) (ASD(Sustainment))		Major General; David J. Sanford	U.S. Air Force
Defense Threat Reduction Agency	Director, Defense Threat Reduction Agency (DTRA) and Deputy Director, Defense Threat Reduction Agency	Not applicable		Major General; Lyle K. Drew; Acting	U.S. Air Force

==== Joint Staff ====
Position insignia	Position	Part of	Photo	Incumbent	Service branch
Joint Staff	Vice Director for Strategy, Plans and Policy (J-5), Joint Staff	Office of the Joint Staff		Major General; Mark H. Slocum	U.S. Air Force
Joint Staff	Deputy Director for Joint Force Development (J-7), Joint Staff	(J-7) Joint Force Development Directorate		Major General; Peter G. Bailey	U.S. Air Force

==== Unified combatant commands ====
Position insignia	Position	Part of	Photo	Incumbent	Service branch
Africa Command
U.S. Africa Command	Director of Operations (J-3), U.S. Africa Command (USAFRICOM)	Not applicable		Major General; Justin R. Hoffman	U.S. Air Force
Central Command
U.S. Central Command	Director of Operations (J-3), U.S. Central Command (USCENTCOM)	Not applicable		Major General; Curtis R. Bass	U.S. Air Force
Cyber Command
U.S. Cyber Command National Security Agency	Air National Guard Assistant to the Commander, U.S. Cyber Command (USCYBERCOM) and Director, National Security Agency (NSA)	Air National Guard (ANG)		Major General; Matthew D. Dinmore	U.S. Air Force
European Command
U.S. European Command	Director of Operations (J-3), U.S. European Command (USEUCOM)	Not applicable		Major General; Daniel T. Lasica	U.S. Air Force
U.S. European Command	Director of Plans, Policy, and Strategy (J-5), U.S. European Command (USEUCOM)	Not applicable		Major General; Russell D. Driggers	U.S. Air Force
U.S. European Command	Director of Exercises and Assessments (ECJ7) and Reserve Component Advisor, U.S. European Command (USEUCOM)	Not applicable		Major General; James R. Kriesel	U.S. Air Force
Indo-Pacific Command
U.S. Indo-Pacific Command	Chief of Staff, U.S. Indo-Pacific Command (USINDOPACOM)	Not applicable		Major General; Michael R. Drowley	U.S. Air Force
U.S. Indo-Pacific Command	Mobilization Assistant to the Commander, U.S. Indo-Pacific Command (USINDOPACOM)	Not applicable		Major General; Christopher K. Faurot	U.S. Air Force
Northern Command
North American Aerospace Defense Command	Deputy Director of Operations (J-3), North American Aerospace Defense Command (NORAD)	Not applicable		Major General; Mark D. Piper	U.S. Air Force
U.S. Northern Command North American Aerospace Defense Command	Special Assistant to the Commander, U.S. Northern Command (USNORTHCOM) and North American Aerospace Defense Command (NORAD) for Reserve Matters	Not applicable		Major General; Bradford R. Everman	U.S. Air Force
Space Command
U.S. Space Command	Director of Joint Exercises and Training (J-7), U.S. Space Command (USSPACECOM)	Not applicable		Major General; Samuel C. Keener	U.S. Air Force
U.S. Space Command	Mobilization Assistant to the Commander, U.S. Space Command (USSPACECOM)	U.S. Air Force Reserve (AFR)		Major General; Jody A. Merritt	U.S. Air Force
Strategic Command
U.S. Strategic Command	Mobilization Assistant to the Commander, U.S. Strategic Command (USSTRATCOM)	U.S. Air Force Reserve (AFR)		Major General; William D. Murphy	U.S. Air Force
U.S. Strategic Command	Mobilization Assistant to the Deputy Commander, U.S. Strategic Command (USSTRATCOM)	Air National Guard (ANG)		Major General; Matthew A. Barker	U.S. Air Force
Joint Electromagnetic Spectrum Operations Center, U.S. Strategic Command	Director, Joint Electromagnetic Spectrum Operations Center, U.S. Strategic Command (USSTRATCOM)	Not applicable		Major General; AnnMarie K. Anthony	U.S. Air Force
Transportation Command
U.S. Transportation Command	Mobilization Assistant to the Commander, U.S. Transportation Command (USTRANSCOM)	U.S. Air Force Reserve (AFR)		Major General; Dana N. Nelson	U.S. Air Force
Georgia Air National Guard U.S. Transportation Command	Assistant Adjutant General – Air, Georgia, Commander, Georgia Air National Guard (GA ANG) and Air National Guard Assistant to the Commander, U.S. Transportation Command (USTRANSCOM)	Air National Guard (ANG)		Major General; Konata A. Crumbly	U.S. Air Force

==== National Guard ====
Position insignia	Position	Part of	Photo	Incumbent	Service branch
National Guard Bureau
National Guard Bureau	Director of Staff, National Guard Bureau (NGB)	Not applicable		Major General; Darrin E. Slaten	U.S. Air Force
National Guard Bureau	Director of Manpower and Personnel (J-1), National Guard Bureau (NGB)	Not applicable		Major General; Wendy B. Wenke	U.S. Air Force

==== Other joint positions ====
Position insignia	Position	Part of	Photo	Incumbent	Service branch
Sub-unified commands
Special Operations Command Africa	Commander, Special Operations Command Africa (SOCAFRICA)	U.S. Special Operations Command (USSOCOM); U.S. Africa Command (USAFRICOM)		Major General; Claude K. Tudor Jr.	U.S. Air Force
Special activities
Joint Forces Staff College	Commandant, Joint Forces Staff College (JFSC)	National Defense University (NDU)		Major General; Thomas D. Crimmins	U.S. Air Force
F-35 Lightning II Joint Program Office	Director, Lightning Sustainment Center, F-35 Lightning II Joint Program Office	Not applicable		Major General; Donald K. Carpenter	U.S. Air Force
Allied Joint Force Command Brunssum	Netherlands; Deputy Chief of Staff for Operations, Allied Joint Force Command Brunssum (JFCBS)	North Atlantic Treaty Organization (NATO)		Major General; Randolph J. Staudenraus	U.S. Air Force
	Germany; Deputy Commander, Security Assistance Group – Ukraine (SAG-U), Operation Atlantic Resolve (OAR)	U.S. European Command (USEUCOM)		Major General; Kevin V. Doyle	U.S. Air Force

== United States Air Force and Space Force ==
=== Department of the Air Force ===
Position insignia	Position	Part of	Photo	Incumbent	Service branch
Offices of the Secretary and Under Secretary
Inspector General of the Department of the Air Force	Deputy Inspector General of the Department of the Air Force	Office of the Secretary of the Air Force (SAF/OS)		Major General; Neil R. Richardson	U.S. Air Force
Office of the Legislative Liaison, Office of the Secretary of the Air Force	Director, Legislative Liaison, Office of the Secretary of the Air Force	Office of the Secretary of the Air Force (SAF/OS)		Major General; Benjamin R. Maitre	U.S. Air Force
Deputy Under Secretary of the Air Force for International Affairs	Assistant Deputy Under Secretary of the Air Force for International Affairs, Office of the Under Secretary of the Air Force	Office of the Under Secretary of the Air Force (USECAF)		Major General; Ricky L. Mills	U.S. Air Force
Arizona Air National Guard Deputy Under Secretary of the Air Force for International Affairs	Assistant Adjutant General for Air – Arizona and Air National Guard Assistant to the Secretary of the Air Force for International Affairs (SAF/IA)	Office of the Under Secretary of the Air Force (USECAF); Air National Guard (ANG)		Major General; Troy T. Daniels	U.S. Air Force
Offices of the Assistant Secretaries
Office of the Assistant Secretary of the Air Force (Acquisition, Technology and Logistics)	Deputy Assistant Secretary for Contracting, Office of the Assistant Secretary of the Air Force (Acquisition, Technology and Logistics)	Office of the Assistant Secretary of the Air Force (Acquisition, Technology and Logistics) (SAF/AQ)		Major General; Alice W. Treviño	U.S. Air Force
Office of the Assistant Secretary of the Air Force (Acquisition, Technology and Logistics)	Director of Global Power Programs, Office of the Assistant Secretary of the Air Force (Acquisition, Technology and Logistics)	Office of the Assistant Secretary of the Air Force (Acquisition, Technology and Logistics) (SAF/AQ)		Major General; John R. Edwards	U.S. Air Force
Office of the Assistant Secretary of the Air Force (Acquisition, Technology and Logistics)	Director of Global Reach Programs, Office of the Assistant Secretary of the Air Force (Acquisition, Technology and Logistics)	Office of the Assistant Secretary of the Air Force (Acquisition, Technology and Logistics) (SAF/AQ)		Major General; Darren R. Cole	U.S. Air Force
Washington National Guard Assistant Secretary of the Air Force (Manpower and Reserve Affairs)	The Adjutant General, Washington, Director, Washington Military Department and Assistant to the Assistant Secretary of the Air Force (Manpower and Reserve Affairs) (SAF/MR)	Office of the Assistant Secretary of the Air Force (Manpower and Reserve Affairs) (SAF/MR)		Major General; Gent Welsh Jr.	U.S. Air Force

=== Air Staff ===
Position insignia	Position	Part of	Photo	Incumbent	Service branch
Air Staff directorates
Chief of Staff of the Air Force	Mobilization Assistant to the Chief of Staff of the Air Force (CSAF)	Air Staff; U.S. Air Force Reserve (AFR)		Major General; Robert M. Blake	U.S. Air Force
Air Staff	Director, Air Force Reserve (AF/RE) Personnel	Air Staff; U.S. Air Force Reserve (AFR)		Major General; Melissa A. Coburn	U.S. Air Force
Air Staff	Senior; Assistant Deputy Chief of Staff for Operations (A3)	Air Staff		Major General; Akshai M. Gandhi	U.S. Air Force
Air Staff	Junior; Assistant Deputy Chief of Staff for Operations (A3)	Air Staff		Major General; John M. Klein Jr.	U.S. Air Force
Air Staff	Mobilization Assistant to the Deputy Chief of Staff for Operations (A3)	Air Staff; U.S. Air Force Reserve (AFR)		Major General; Mitchell A. Hanson	U.S. Air Force
Air Staff	Mobilization Assistant to the Deputy Chief of Staff for Logistics, Engineering and Force Protection (A4)	Air Staff; U.S. Air Force Reserve (AFR)		Major General; Elizabeth E. Arledge	U.S. Air Force
Air Staff	Special Assistant to the Deputy Chief of Staff for Logistics, Engineering and Force Protection (A4)	Air Staff		Major General; Roy W. Collins	U.S. Air Force
Air Staff	Director of Force Design, Integration and Wargaming (A5/7I), Office of the Deputy Chief of Staff for Air Force Futures	Air Staff		Major General; Joseph D. Kunkel	U.S. Air Force
Air Staff	Mobilization Assistant to the Deputy Chief of Staff for Air Force Futures (A5)	Air Staff; U.S. Air Force Reserve (AFR)		Major General; Paul R. Fast	U.S. Air Force
Air Staff	Deputy Chief of Staff for Warfighter Communications and Cyber Systems (A6)	Air Staff		Major General; Michele C. Edmondson	U.S. Air Force
Air Staff	Director of Programs, Office of the Deputy Chief of Staff for Plans and Programs (A8P)	Air Staff		Major General; Mark B. Pye	U.S. Air Force
Air Staff	Deputy Director of Programs, Office of the Deputy Chief of Staff for Plans and Programs (A8P)	Air Staff		Major General; Michele L. Kilgore	U.S. Air Force
Air Staff	Director of Intercontinental Ballistic Missile Modernization, Site Activation Task Force, Office of the Deputy Chief of Staff for Strategic Deterrence and Nuclear Integration (A10)	Air Staff		Major General; Colin J. Connor	U.S. Air Force
Specialty positions
U.S. Air Force Chaplain Corps	Chief of Chaplains of the United States Air Force (HAF/HC)	U.S. Air Force Chaplain Corps		Chaplain (Major General); Trent C. Davis	U.S. Air Force
United States Air Force Judge Advocate General's Corps	Judge Advocate General of the United States Air Force and Space Force	U.S. Air Force Judge Advocate General's Corps		Major General; Christopher A. Eason	U.S. Air Force
United States Air Force Judge Advocate General's Corps	United States Air Force Deputy Judge Advocate General (DJAG)	U.S. Air Force Judge Advocate General's Corps		Vacant	U.S. Air Force
U.S. Air Force Judge Advocate General's Corps	Mobilization Assistant to the United States Air Force Judge Advocate General (JAG)	U.S. Air Force Judge Advocate General's Corps; U.S. Air Force Reserve (AFR)		Major General; Mitchel Neurock	U.S. Air Force
United States Air Force Judge Advocate General's Corps	Air National Guard Assistant to the United States Air Force Judge Advocate General (AF/JA)	U.S. Air Force Judge Advocate General's Corps; Air National Guard (ANG)		Major General; Charles M. Walker	U.S. Air Force
U.S. Air Force Medical Service	Mobilization Assistant to the Surgeon General of the United States Air Force and United States Space Force (AF/SG & SF/SG)	U.S. Air Force Medical Service (AFMS)		Major General; John J. Bartrum	U.S. Air Force
U.S. Air Force Medical Service	Air National Guard Assistant to the Surgeon General of the United States Air Force and United States Space Force (AF/SG & SF/SG) and Director of Space Force Medical Operations	U.S. Air Force Medical Service (AFMS); Air National Guard (ANG)		Major General; Sean T. Collins	U.S. Air Force

=== Air Force major commands ===
==== Direct headquarters staff ====
Position insignia	Position	Part of	Photo	Incumbent	Service branch
Air Combat Command
Air Combat Command	Director of Logistics, Engineering and Force Protection (A4), Headquarters Air Combat Command (ACC)	Not applicable		Major General; Jennifer Hammerstedt	U.S. Air Force
Air Combat Command	Director, Plans, Programs and Requirements (A5/8/9), Headquarters Air Combat Command (ACC)	Not applicable		Major General; William D. Betts	U.S. Air Force
Air Combat Command	Mobilization Assistant to the Commander, Air Combat Command (ACC)	U.S. Air Force Reserve (AFR)		Major General; Christopher A. Freeman	U.S. Air Force
Air Combat Command	Air National Guard Assistant to the Commander, Air Combat Command (ACC)	Air National Guard (ANG)		Major General; Bryan E. Salmon	U.S. Air Force
Air Education and Training Command
Air Education and Training Command	Mobilization Assistant to the Commander, Air Education and Training Command (AETC)	U.S. Air Force Reserve (AFR)		Major General; Howard T. Clark III	U.S. Air Force
Air Education and Training Command	Air National Guard Assistant to the Commander, Air Education and Training Command (AETC)	Air National Guard (ANG)		Major General; Frank W. Roy	U.S. Air Force
Air Force Global Strike Command
Air Force Global Strike Command	Air National Guard Assistant to the Commander, Air Force Global Strike Command (AFGSC)	U.S. Strategic Command (USSTRATCOM); Air National Guard (ANG)		Major General; Kenneth S. Eaves	U.S. Air Force
Air Force Materiel Command
Air Force Materiel Command	Comptroller, Headquarters Air Force Materiel Command (AFMC)	Not applicable		Major General; Frank R. Verdugo	U.S. Air Force
Air Force Materiel Command	Mobilization Assistant to the Commander, Air Force Materiel Command (AFMC)	U.S. Air Force Reserve (AFR)		Major General; Mark V. Slominski	U.S. Air Force
Air Force Materiel Command	Air National Guard Assistant to the Commander, Air Force Materiel Command (AFMC)	Air National Guard (ANG)		Major General; Virginia I. Gaglio	U.S. Air Force
Air Force Reserve Command
Air Force Reserve Command	Deputy to the Chief of Air Force Reserve (AF/RE)	U.S. Air Force Reserve (AFR)		Major General; David W. Smith	U.S. Air Force
Air Force Reserve Command	Deputy Commander, Air Force Reserve Command (AFRC)	U.S. Air Force Reserve (AFR)		Major General; Regina A. Sabric	U.S. Air Force
Air Force Reserve Command	Chief of Staff, Air Force Reserve Command (AFRC)	U.S. Air Force Reserve (AFR)		Major General; Jennie R. Johnson	U.S. Air Force
Air Force Reserve Command	Director of Logistics, Engineering and Force Protection, Air Force Reserve Command (AFRC)	U.S. Air Force Reserve (AFR)		Major General; Stacey L. Scarisbrick	U.S. Air Force
Air Force Reserve Command	Mobilization Assistant to the Chief of Air Force Reserve (AF/RE)	U.S. Air Force Reserve (AFR)		Major General; Michael P. Cruff	U.S. Air Force
Air Force Reserve Command	Special Assistant to the Chief of Air Force Reserve (AF/RE)	U.S. Air Force Reserve (AFR)		Major General; Lynnette J. Hebert	U.S. Air Force
Air Force Reserve Command	Mobilization Assistant to the Commander, Air Force Reserve Command (AFRC)	U.S. Air Force Reserve (AFR)		Major General; Preston F. McFarren	U.S. Air Force
Air Force Special Operations Command
Air Force Special Operations Command	Deputy Commander, Air Force Special Operations Command (AFSOC)	U.S. Special Operations Command (USSOCOM)		Major General; Michael E. Martin	U.S. Air Force
Air Force Special Operations Command	Mobilization Assistant to the Commander, Air Force Special Operations Command (AFSOC)	U.S. Special Operations Command (USSOCOM); U.S. Air Force Reserve (AFR)		Major General; Leslie S. Hadley	U.S. Air Force
Air Force Special Operations Command	Air National Guard Assistant to the Commander, Air Force Special Operations Command (AFSOC)	U.S. Special Operations Command (USSOCOM); Air National Guard (ANG)		Major General; Benjamin M. Cason	U.S. Air Force
Air Mobility Command
Air Mobility Command	Director of Operations, Strategic Deterrence, and Nuclear Integration, Headquarters Air Mobility Command (AMC)	U.S. Transportation Command (USTRANSCOM)		Major General; Gerald A. Donohue	U.S. Air Force
Air Mobility Command	Mobilization Assistant to the Commander, Air Mobility Command (AMC)	U.S. Transportation Command (USTRANSCOM); U.S. Air Force Reserve (AFR)		Major General; Adrian K. White	U.S. Air Force
Air Mobility Command	Air National Guard Assistant to the Commander, Air Mobility Command (AMC)	U.S. Transportation Command (USTRANSCOM); Air National Guard (ANG)		Major General; Gary A. McCue	U.S. Air Force
Pacific Air Forces
Pacific Air Forces	Director, Air and Cyberspace Operations, Headquarters Pacific Air Forces (PACAF)	U.S. Indo-Pacific Command (USINDOPACOM)		Major General; David S. Eaglin	U.S. Air Force
Pacific Air Forces	Director, Strategy, Plans, Programs and Requirements (A-5/8), Headquarters Pacific Air Forces (PACAF)	U.S. Indo-Pacific Command (USINDOPACOM); Air National Guard (ANG)		Major General; Christopher J. Sheppard	U.S. Air Force
Pacific Air Forces	Mobilization Assistant to the Commander, Pacific Air Forces (PACAF)	U.S. Indo-Pacific Command (USINDOPACOM); U.S. Air Force Reserve (AFR)		Major General; David A. Piffarerio	U.S. Air Force
U.S. Air Forces in Europe – Air Forces Africa
U.S. Air Forces in Europe U.S. Air Forces in Africa	Director of Operations, Strategic Deterrence, and Nuclear Integration, Headquarters U.S. Air Forces in Europe – Air Forces Africa (USAFE-AFAFRICA)	U.S. European Command (USEUCOM); U.S. Africa Command (USAFRICOM)		Major General; Joseph L. Campo	U.S. Air Force
U.S. Air Forces in Europe U.S. Air Forces in Africa	Mobilization Assistant to the Commander, U.S. Air Forces in Europe – Air Forces Africa (USAFE-AFAFRICA)	U.S. European Command (USEUCOM); U.S. Africa Command (USAFRICOM); U.S. Air Force Reserve (AFR)		Major General; Christopher F. Yancy	U.S. Air Force
Air Forces Southern
Air Forces Southern	Commander, Air Forces Southern (AFSOUTH)	U.S. Southern Command (USSOUTHCOM)		Major General; David A. Mineau	U.S. Air Force
Integrated Capabilities Command (Provisional)
	Commander, Integrated Capabilities Command (Provisional)	Not applicable		Major General; Mark W. Mitchum	U.S. Air Force

==== Subordinate commands ====
Position insignia	Position	Part of	Photo	Incumbent	Service branch
Subordinate to Air Combat Command
U.S. Air Force Warfare Center	Commander, U.S. Air Force Warfare Center (USAFWC)	Air Combat Command (ACC)		Major General; Christopher J. Niemi	U.S. Air Force
Subordinate to Air Education and Training Command
Curtis E. LeMay Center for Doctrine Development and Education Air University	Commander, Curtis E. LeMay Center for Doctrine Development and Education and Deputy Commander, Air University	Air Education and Training Command (AETC)		Major General; Parker H. Wright	U.S. Air Force
Air University	Mobilization Assistant to the Commander and President, Air University	Air Education and Training Command (AETC); U.S. Air Force Reserve (AFR)		Major General; Anne B. Gunter	U.S. Air Force
Subordinate to Air Force Materiel Command
Air Force Installation and Mission Support Center	Commander, Air Force Installation and Mission Support Center (AFIMSC)	Air Force Materiel Command (AFMC)		Major General; Thomas P. Sherman	U.S. Air Force
Program Executive Office, Command, Control, Communications and Battle Management	Program Executive Officer for Command, Control, Communications and Battle Management (PEO C3BM)	Office of the Assistant Secretary of the Air Force (Acquisition, Technology and Logistics) (SAF/AQ); Air Force Life Cycle Management Center (AFLCMC)		Major General; Luke C. G. Cropsey	U.S. Air Force
Air Force Test Center	Commander, Air Force Test Center (AFTC)	Air Force Materiel Command (AFMC)		Major General; Scott A. Cain	U.S. Air Force

=== Field Operating Agencies ===
Position insignia	Position	Part of	Photo	Incumbent	Service branch
Air Force Safety Center	Chief of Safety of the United States Air Force (AF/SE) and Commander, Air Force Safety Center (AFSEC)	Air Staff		Major General; Sean M. Choquette	U.S. Air Force
Air Force Personnel Center	Commander, Air Force Personnel Center (AFPC)	Office of the Deputy Chief of Staff for Manpower, Personnel and Services (A1)		Major General; Jefferson J. O'Donnell	U.S. Air Force

=== Direct reporting units ===
Position insignia	Position	Part of	Photo	Incumbent	Service branch
Air Force District of Washington	Commander, Air Force District of Washington (AFDW) and Commander, 320th Air Expeditionary Wing	Joint Task Force – National Capital Region (JTF-NCR)		Major General; Daniel A. DeVoe	U.S. Air Force

=== Operating forces ===
Position insignia	Position	Part of	Photo	Incumbent	Service branch
Numbered air forces
First Air Force (Air Forces Northern and Air Forces Space)	Deputy Commander, First Air Force (Air Forces Northern/AFNORTH and Air Forces Space/AFSPACE) (1 AF)	U.S. Northern Command (USNORTHCOM); U.S. Space Command (USSPACECOM); Air National Guard (ANG)		Major General; Michael A. Valle	U.S. Air Force
First Air Force (Air Forces Northern and Air Forces Space) Continental U.S. NORAD Region	Mobilization Assistant to the Commander, Continental U.S. NORAD Region (CONR) and Commander, First Air Force (Air Forces Northern/AFNORTH and Air Forces Space/AFSPACE) (1 AF)	U.S. Northern Command (USNORTHCOM); U.S. Space Command (USSPACECOM); U.S. Air Force Reserve (AFR)		Major General; David P. Garfield	U.S. Air Force
Second Air Force	Commander, Second Air Force (2 AF)	Air Education and Training Command (AETC)		Major General; Matthew W. Davidson	U.S. Air Force
Third Air Force (Air Forces Europe)	Commander, Third Air Force (Air Forces Europe) (3 AF)	U.S. Air Forces in Europe – Air Forces Africa (USAFE-AFAFRICA)		Major General; Paul D. Moga	U.S. Air Force
Fourth Air Force	Commander, Fourth Air Force (4 AF)	Air Force Reserve Command (AFRC); U.S. Air Force Reserve (AFR)		Major General; Derin S. Durham	U.S. Air Force
Eighth Air Force (Air Forces Strategic)	Commander, Eighth Air Force (Air Forces Strategic) (8 AF) and Commander, Joint-Global Strike Operations Center (J-GSOC)	U.S. Strategic Command (USSTRATCOM); Air Force Global Strike Command (AFGSC)		Major General; Ty W. Neuman	U.S. Air Force
Ninth Air Force U.S. Air Forces Central Command	Deputy Commander, Ninth Air Force (9 AF), Deputy Commander, U.S. Air Forces Central Command (USAFCENT) and Deputy, Combined Forces Air Component Commander, U.S. Central Command	U.S. Central Command (USCENTCOM); Air Combat Command (ACC)		Major General; David G. Shoemaker	U.S. Air Force
Ninth Air Force U.S. Air Forces Central Command	Mobilization Assistant to the Commander, Ninth Air Force (9 AF) and U.S. Air Forces Central Command (USAFCENT)	U.S. Central Command (USCENTCOM); Air Combat Command (ACC); U.S. Air Force Reserve (AFR)		Major General; David M. Castaneda	U.S. Air Force
Ninth Air Force U.S. Air Forces Central Command	Air National Guard Assistant to the Commander, Ninth Air Force (9 AF) and U.S. Air Forces Central Command (USAFCENT)	U.S. Central Command (USCENTCOM); Air Combat Command (ACC); Air National Guard (ANG)		Major General; Paul D. Johnson	U.S. Air Force
Fifteenth Air Force	Commander, Fifteenth Air Force (15 AF)	Air Combat Command (ACC)		Major General; Steven G. Behmer	U.S. Air Force
Sixteenth Air Force Air Forces Cyber	Deputy Commander, Sixteenth Air Force (Air Forces Cyber/AFCYBER) (16 AF)	U.S. Cyber Command (USCYBERCOM); Air Combat Command (ACC)		Major General; Larry R. Broadwell Jr.	U.S. Air Force
Sixteenth Air Force Air Forces Cyber	Mobilization Assistant to the Commander, Sixteenth Air Force (Air Forces Cyber/AFCYBER) (16 AF)	U.S. Cyber Command (USCYBERCOM); Air Combat Command (ACC); U.S. Air Force Reserve (AFR)		Major General; Lori C. Jones	U.S. Air Force
Sixteenth Air Force Air Forces Cyber	Air National Guard Assistant to the Commander, Sixteenth Air Force (Air Forces Cyber/AFCYBER) (16 AF)	U.S. Cyber Command (USCYBERCOM); Air Combat Command (ACC); Air National Guard (ANG)		Major General; Victor R. Macias	U.S. Air Force
Eighteenth Air Force (Air Forces Transportation)	Commander, Eighteenth Air Force (Air Forces Transportation) (18 AF)	U.S. Transportation Command (USTRANSCOM); Air Mobility Command (AMC)		Major General; Charles D. Bolton	U.S. Air Force
Nineteenth Air Force	Commander, Nineteenth Air Force (19 AF)	Air Education and Training Command (AETC)		Major General; Gregory Kreuder	U.S. Air Force
Twentieth Air Force (Air Forces Strategic)	Commander, Twentieth Air Force (Air Forces Strategic) (20 AF)	U.S. Strategic Command (USSTRATCOM); Air Force Global Strike Command (AFGSC)		Major General; Stacy Jo Huser	U.S. Air Force
Twenty-Second Air Force	Commander, Twenty-Second Air Force (22 AF)	Air Force Reserve Command (AFRC); U.S. Air Force Reserve (AFR)	cenrer	Major General; Frank L. Bradfield III	U.S. Air Force

=== Air National Guard ===
Position insignia	Position	Part of	Photo	Incumbent	Service branch
Air National Guard	Director, Air National Guard (ANG) and Deputy Director, Air National Guard	National Guard; National Guard Bureau (NGB)		Major General; Duke A. Pirak; Acting	U.S. Air Force
Air National Guard	Junior; Special Assistant to the Director, Air National Guard (ANG)	National Guard; National Guard Bureau (NGB)		Major General; Bryony A. Terrell	U.S. Air Force
Air National Guard First Air Force (Air Forces Northern Air Forces Space)	Junior; Special Assistant to the Director, Air National Guard (ANG) and Deputy, Combined Force Air Component Commander, First Air Force (Air Forces Northern/AFNORTH and Air Forces Space/AFSPACE) (1 AF)	National Guard; National Guard Bureau (NGB); U.S. Northern Command (USNORTHCOM)		Major General; Randal K. Efferson	U.S. Air Force

=== United States Space Force ===
Position insignia	Position	Part of	Photo	Incumbent	Service branch
Space Staff	Mobilization Assistant to the Chief of Space Operations (CSO)	Not applicable		Major General; Robert W. Claude	U.S. Air Force
Space Operations Command	Mobilization Assistant to the Commander, Space Operations Command (SpOC)	U.S. Air Force Reserve (AFR)		Major General; Stephen E. Slade	U.S. Air Force

== List of pending appointments ==
=== Retaining current position/position unannounced ===
Photo	Name	Service branch	Status and date
Nominations (June 2025)
	Brigadier General; Aaron D. Drake	U.S. Air Force	Confirmed by the Senate; 29 June 2025
	Brigadier General; Dean D. Sniegowski	U.S. Air Force	Confirmed by the Senate; 29 June 2025
Nominations (January 2023)
	Brigadier General; William W. Whittenberger Jr.	U.S. Air Force	Confirmed by the Senate; 5 December 2023

== See also ==
- List of active duty United States four-star officers
- List of active duty United States three-star officers
- List of active duty United States Army major generals
- List of active duty United States Marine Corps major generals
- List of active duty United States rear admirals
- List of active duty United States Space Force general officers
- List of active duty United States senior enlisted leaders and advisors
- List of current United States National Guard major generals
- List of United States Army four-star generals
- List of United States Marine Corps four-star generals
- List of United States Navy four-star admirals
- List of United States Air Force four-star generals
- List of United States Coast Guard four-star admirals
