= Leadership of United States Space Forces – Space =

U.S. Space Force senior officer

This is a list of all commanders of United States Space Forces – Space and all its historical antecedents, organizations that took its lineage.

== Current headquarters staff ==
- Dennis Bythewood, Commander
  - U.S. Space Force CMSgt Tina R. Timmerman, Senior Enlisted Leader
  - Frank R. Kincaid, Deputy Commander
    - Nathaniel A. Peace, Director, Intelligence (S2)

== List of commanders ==
Commander of United States Space Forces – Space
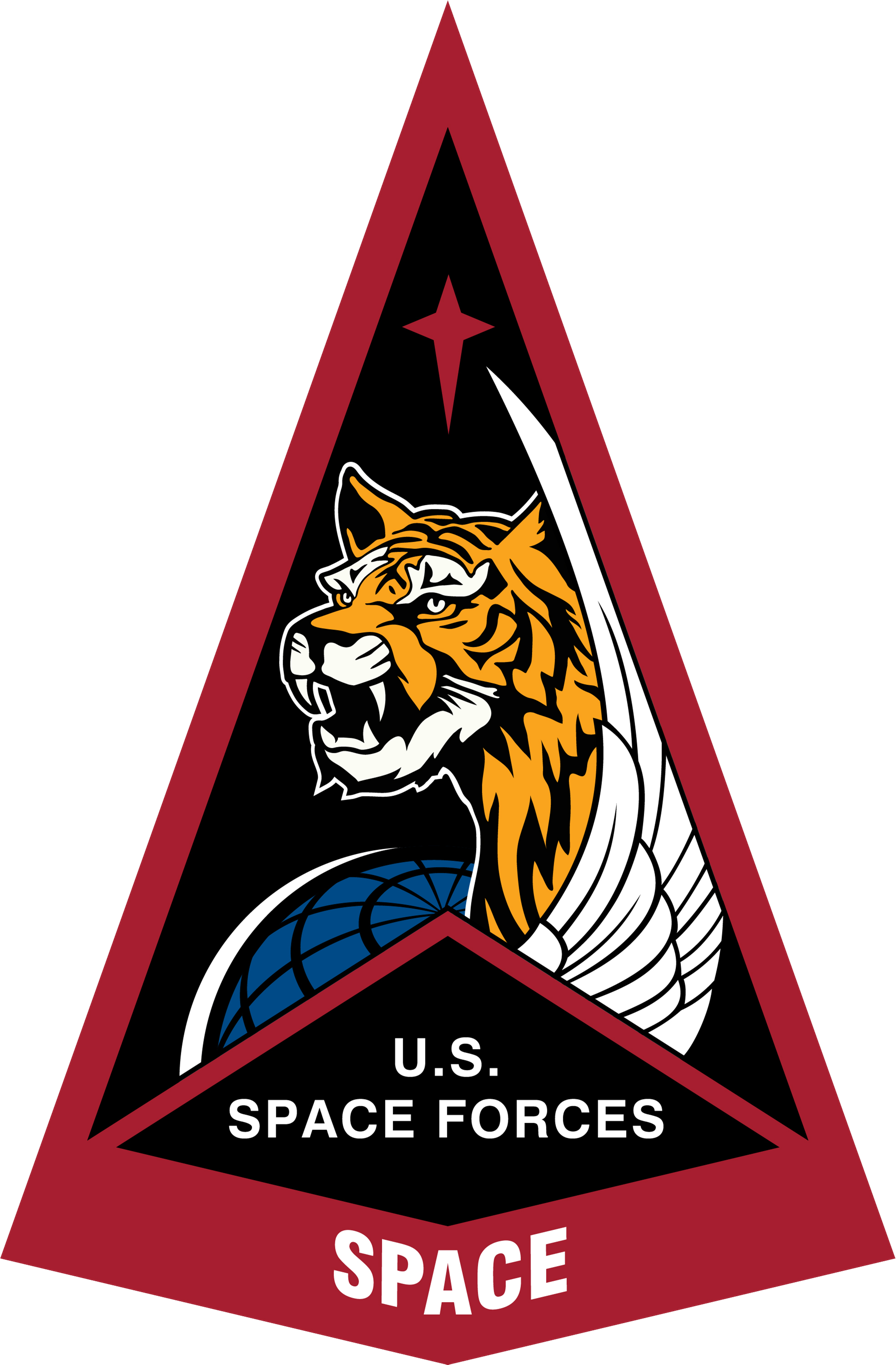
- United States Space Forces – Space emblem

- Flag of a Space Force lieutenant general

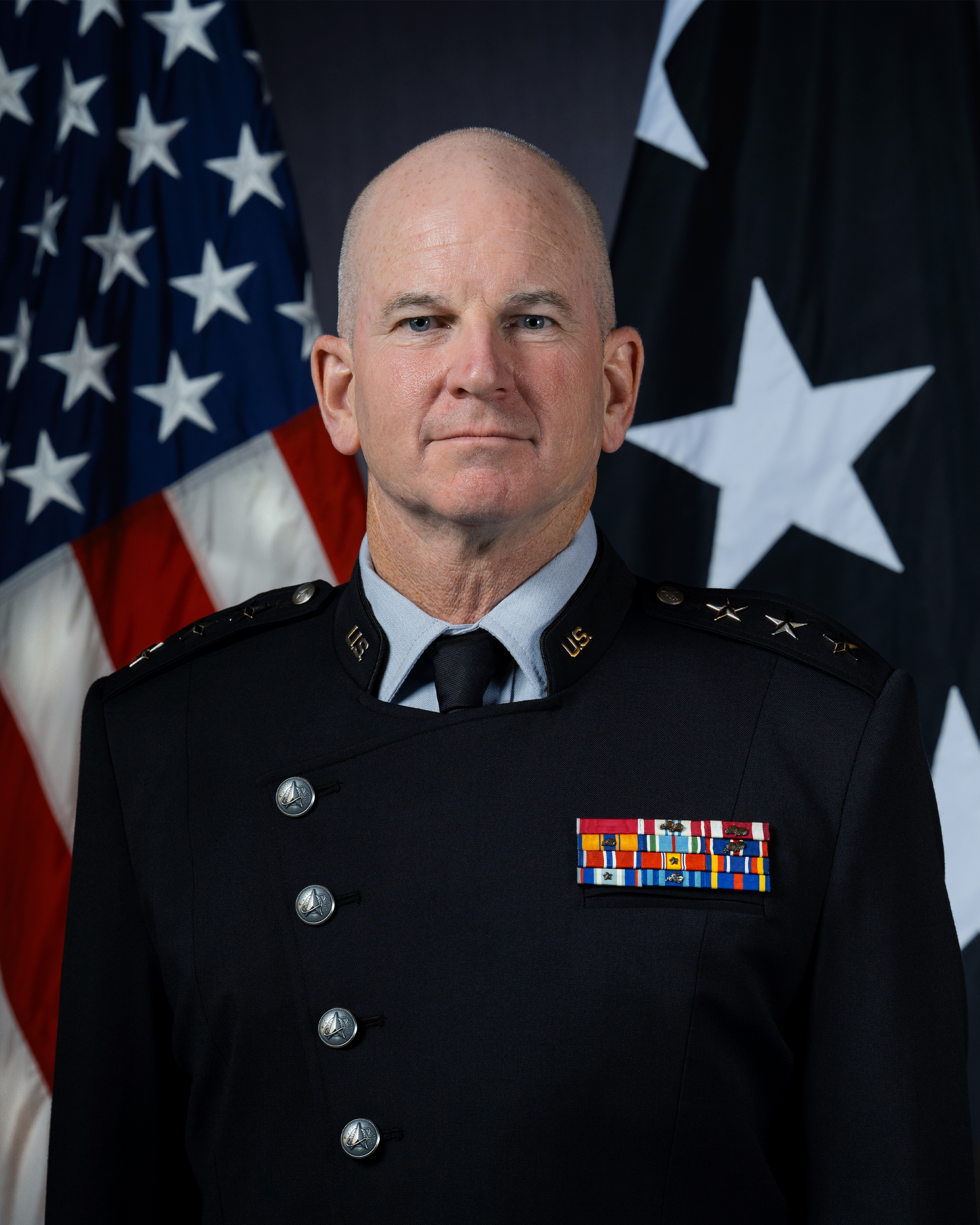
- Incumbent; Lieutenant General Dennis Bythewood since 4 November 2025
- United States Space Force
- Reports to: Chief of Space Operations; Commander, U.S. Space Command
- Seat: Vandenberg Space Force Base, Colorado, U.S.
- Precursor: Commander, Space Operations Command West
- First holder: Douglas A. Schiess
- Deputy: Deputy Commander, United States Space Forces – Space

No.	Commander		Term			Ref
No.	Portrait	Name	Took office	Left office	Duration	Ref
Space Operations Command
1	John E. Shaw	Major General; John E. Shaw (born 1968)	20 December 2019	21 October 2020	306 days	
Space Operations Command West
1	John E. Shaw	Major General; John E. Shaw (born 1968)	21 October 2020	16 November 2020	26 days	
2	DeAnna Burt	Major General; DeAnna Burt (born 1969)	16 November 2020	22 August 2022	1 year, 279 days	
3	Douglas Schiess	Major General; Douglas Schiess (born 1970)	22 August 2022	6 December 2023	1 year, 106 days	
United States Space Forces – Space
1	Douglas Schiess	Lieutenant General; Douglas Schiess (born 1970)	6 December 2023	4 November 2025	1 year, 333 days	
2	Dennis Bythewood	Lieutenant General; Dennis Bythewood (born c. 1970)	4 November 2025	Incumbent	349 days	

== List of deputy commanders ==
No.	Deputy Commander		Term			Ref
No.	Portrait	Name	Took office	Left office	Duration	Ref
Space Operations Command
1	Matthew Wolfe Davidson	Brigadier General; Matthew Wolfe Davidson (born c. 1971)	20 December 2019	April 2020	~118 days	
2	Michael E. Conley	Brigadier General; Michael E. Conley (born c. 1974)	April 2020	21 October 2020	~189 days	
Space Operations Command West
1	Michael E. Conley	Brigadier General; Michael E. Conley (born c. 1974)	21 October 2020	July 2022	~1 year, 267 days	
2	Shay Warakomski	Colonel; Shay Warakomski (born c. 1972)	July 2022	August 2023	~1 year, 31 days	
3	Dennis Bythewood	Brigadier General; Dennis Bythewood (born c. 1970)	August 2023	6 December 2023	~113 days	
United States Space Forces – Space
1	Dennis Bythewood	Major General; Dennis Bythewood (born c. 1970)	6 December 2023	~25 July 2024	~232 days	
2	Frank R. Kincaid	Brigadier General; Frank R. Kincaid (born c. 1972)	~25 July 2024	Incumbent	2 years, 86 days	

== List of senior enlisted leaders ==
No.	Senior Enlisted Leader		Term			Ref
No.	Portrait	Name	Took office	Left office	Duration	Ref
1	John F. Bentivegna	Chief Master Sergeant; John F. Bentivegna (born c. 1976)	20 December 2019	21 October 2020	306 days	
2	Grange S. Coffin IV	Chief Master Sergeant; Grange S. Coffin IV (born c. 1982)	21 October 2020	22 August 2024	3 years, 306 days	
3	Tina R. Timmerman	Chief Master Sergeant; Tina R. Timmerman (born c. 1982)	22 August 2024	Incumbent	2 years, 58 days	

== See also ==
- United States Space Forces – Space
- Leadership of Space Operations Command
- Leadership of Space Systems Command
- Leadership of Space Training and Readiness Command
