= Albert Elton =

Retired U.S. Air Force general

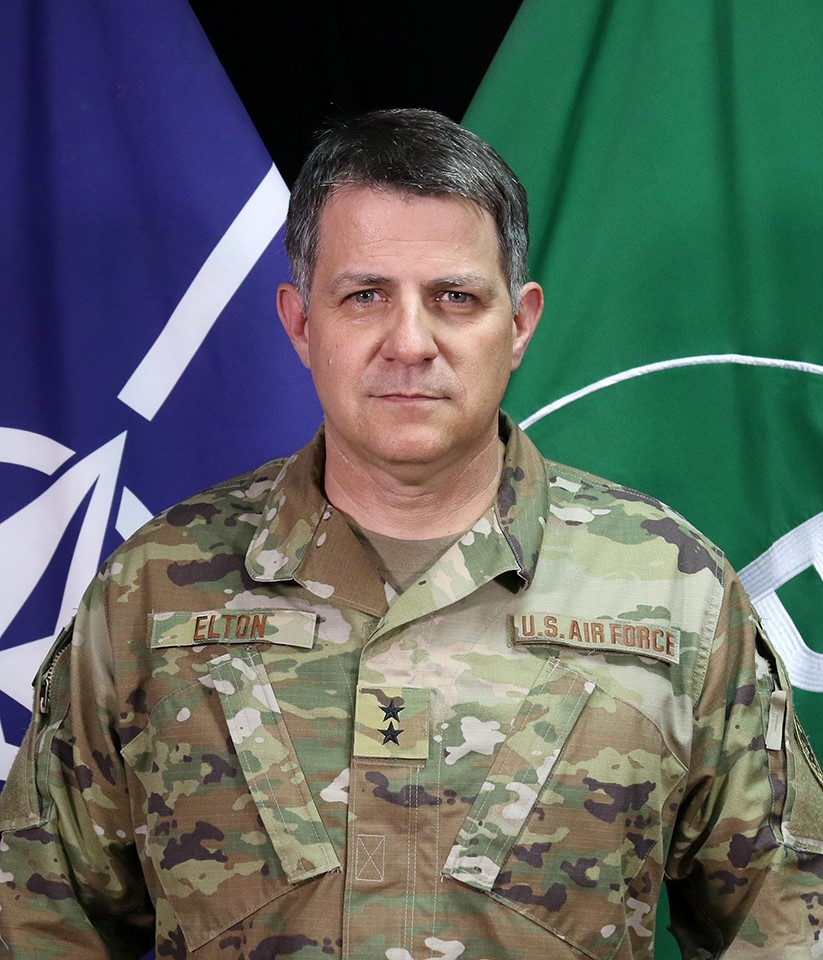
- Military career
- Allegiance: United States
- Branch: United States Air Force
- Service years: 1989–2020
- Rank: Major general
- Nickname: Buck
- Commands: Special Operations Joint Task Force–Afghanistan; NATO Special Operations Component Command–Afghanistan; 27th Special Operations Wing; 1st Special Operations Group
- Conflicts: War in Afghanistan; Iraq War
- Awards: Defense Superior Service Medal (2); Legion of Merit (2); Bronze Star Medal (2)

Albert M. "Buck" Elton II is a retired United States Air Force major general who last served as the commander of the Special Operations Joint Task Force–Afghanistan and NATO Special Operations Component Command–Afghanistan. Previously, he was the deputy director for special operations and counterterrorism of the Joint Staff. Raised in Lone Pine, California, Elton earned a Bachelor of Science degree in management from the United States Air Force Academy in 1989. He later received a Master of Aviation Science degree from Embry–Riddle Aeronautical University in 1996. He has the rating of command pilot and more than 4,300 flight hours, including 190 combat hours over Afghanistan, Iraq, and Bosnia-Herzegovina.

Military offices
Preceded by Stephen A. Clark	Commander of the 27th Special Operations Wing; 2011–2013	Succeeded by Tony D. Bauernfeind
Preceded by Michael Kurilla	Deputy Director for Special Operations and Counter-Terrorism of the Joint Staff; 2016–2018	Succeeded by Chris Donahue
Preceded by James B. Linder	Commander of the Special Operations Joint Task Force–Afghanistan and NATO Special Operations Component Command–Afghanistan; 2018–2019	Succeeded by Chris Donahue
