= 605th Special Operations Squadron =

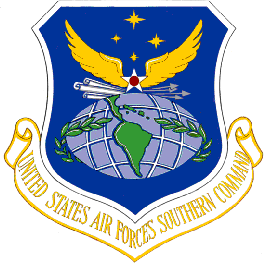
5th Fighter Squadron (Commando)

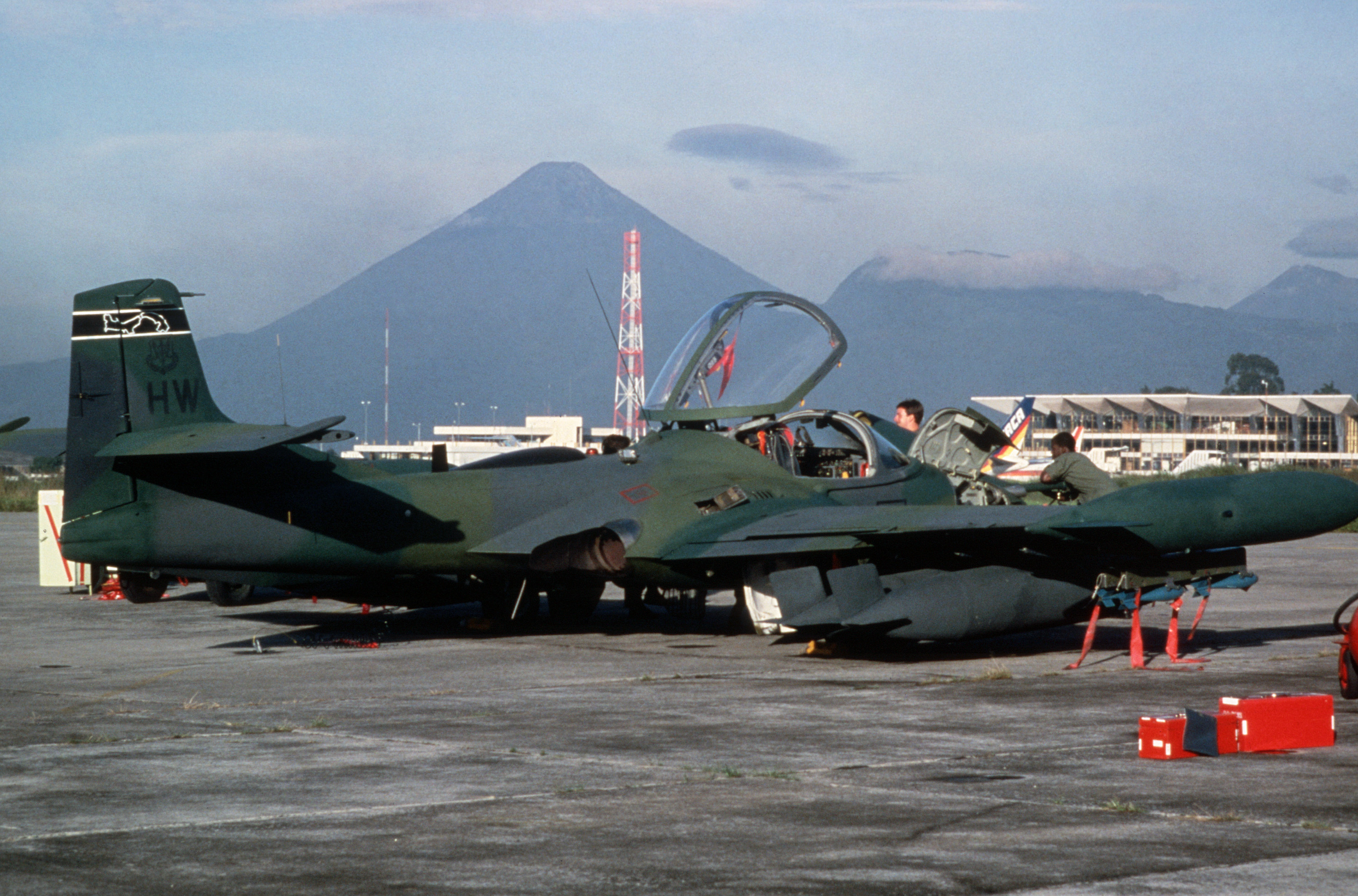
- OA-37B of the 24th Wing in Guatemala
- Active: 1944–1945, 1962–1972
- Country: United States
- Branch: United States Air Force
- Role: Special Operations
- Mottos: Cualquier Hora, Cualquier Lugar Spanish Anyplace, Anytime

Insignia
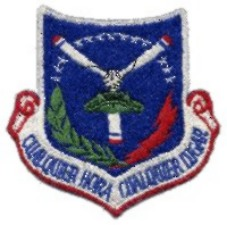
- 605th Special Operations Squadron emblem

The 605th Special Operations Squadron is an inactive United States Air Force unit. Its last assignment was with the 24th Special Operations Wing at Howard Air Force Base, Panama Canal Zone, where it was inactivated on 30 April 1972.

== History ==
The squadron was first active during World War II as the 5th Fighter Squadron, Commando. After training in the United States the squadron moved to the China Burma India Theater, where it served in combat until the surrender of Japan. The squadron returned to the United States where it was inactivated in November 1945.

The squadron was activated again in October 1963 as the United States expanded its special operations units and was stationed in the Panama Canal Zone, where it trained units of various Latin American air forces until it was inactivated in late 1972.

== Lineage ==
- Constituted as the 5th Fighter Squadron, Commando on 9 August 1944

Activated on 1 September 1944
Inactivated on 3 November 1945

- Disbanded on 8 October 1948
- Reconstituted 24 October 1963, redesignated 605th Air Commando Squadron, Composite and activated (not organized)

Organized on 15 November 1963
Redesignated 605th Special Operations Squadron on 1 August 1968
Inactivated on 30 April 1972

=== Assignments ===
- 1st Air Commando Group, 1 September 1944 – 3 November 1945 (attached to 1st Provisional Fighter Group, February 1945 – May 1945)
- Tactical Air Command, 24 October 1963 (not organized)
- 1st Air Commando Wing 15 November 1963 (attached to USAF Southern Command (?) November 1963 – July 1964)
- 5700th Air Base Wing. 1 July 1965
- 24th Air Commando Wing (later 24th Special Operations Wing), 8 November 1967 – 30 April 1972

=== Stations ===
- Asansol, Bihar, India, 1 September 1944
  - one detachment operated from Cox's Bazar, Bengal, India, 15–21 Oct 1944, and another from Fenny Airfield, Bengal, India, 8–30 Nov 1944)
- Fenny Airfield, Bengal, India, 28 December 1944;
- Hay, India, 7 February 1945
- Asansol, Bihar, India, 13 May 1945
- Kalaikunda Air Force Station, Bengal, India, 23 May 1945
- Asansol, Bihar, India, 22 June 1945 – 6 October 1945
- Camp Kilmer, New Jersey, 1 November 1945 – 3 November 1945.
- Howard Air Force Base, Panama Canal Zone 15 November 1963 – 30 April 1972

=== Aircraft ===
- Helio U-10 Courier
- Douglas A-26K Invader
- Douglas C-47 Skytrain
- North American T-28 Trojan
- North American P-51 Mustang (1945)
- Republic P-47 Thunderbolt (1944–1945)
- Curtiss C-46 Commando
