= Tony D. Bauernfeind =

US Air Force Lieutenant general

- Official portrait, 2026

Personal details
- Born: November 3, 1969 (age 57)
- Education: United States Air Force Academy (BS); Auburn University (MBA)

Military service
- Allegiance: United States
- Branch/service: United States Air Force
- Years of service: 1991–present
- Rank: Lieutenant General
- Commands: United States Air Force Academy; Air Force Special Operations Command; Special Operations Command Korea; 27th Special Operations Wing; 1st Special Operations Group
- Battles/wars: War in Afghanistan; Iraq War
- Awards: Defense Superior Service Medal (3); Legion of Merit (2); Bronze Star Medal (3)

Tony D. Bauernfeind (born 3 November 1969) is a United States Air Force lieutenant general who served as the 22nd superintendent of the United States Air Force Academy. He most recently served as the commander of Air Force Special Operations Command from 2022 to 2024. He served as vice commander of the United States Special Operations Command from 2020 to 2022; as vice commander, Bauernfeind was responsible for planning, coordinating, and executing actions with the Office of the Secretary of Defense, the Joint Staff, the services and other government agencies in the national capital region on behalf of the commander of United States Special Operations Command. He previously served as Special Operations Command's chief of staff and as commander of Special Operations Command Korea.

In June 2022, Bauernfeind was selected as commander of the Air Force Special Operations Command. In May 2024, he was nominated for assignment as superintendent of the United States Air Force Academy. He began this assignment on 2 August 2024, until 7 August 2026.

== Awards and decorations ==
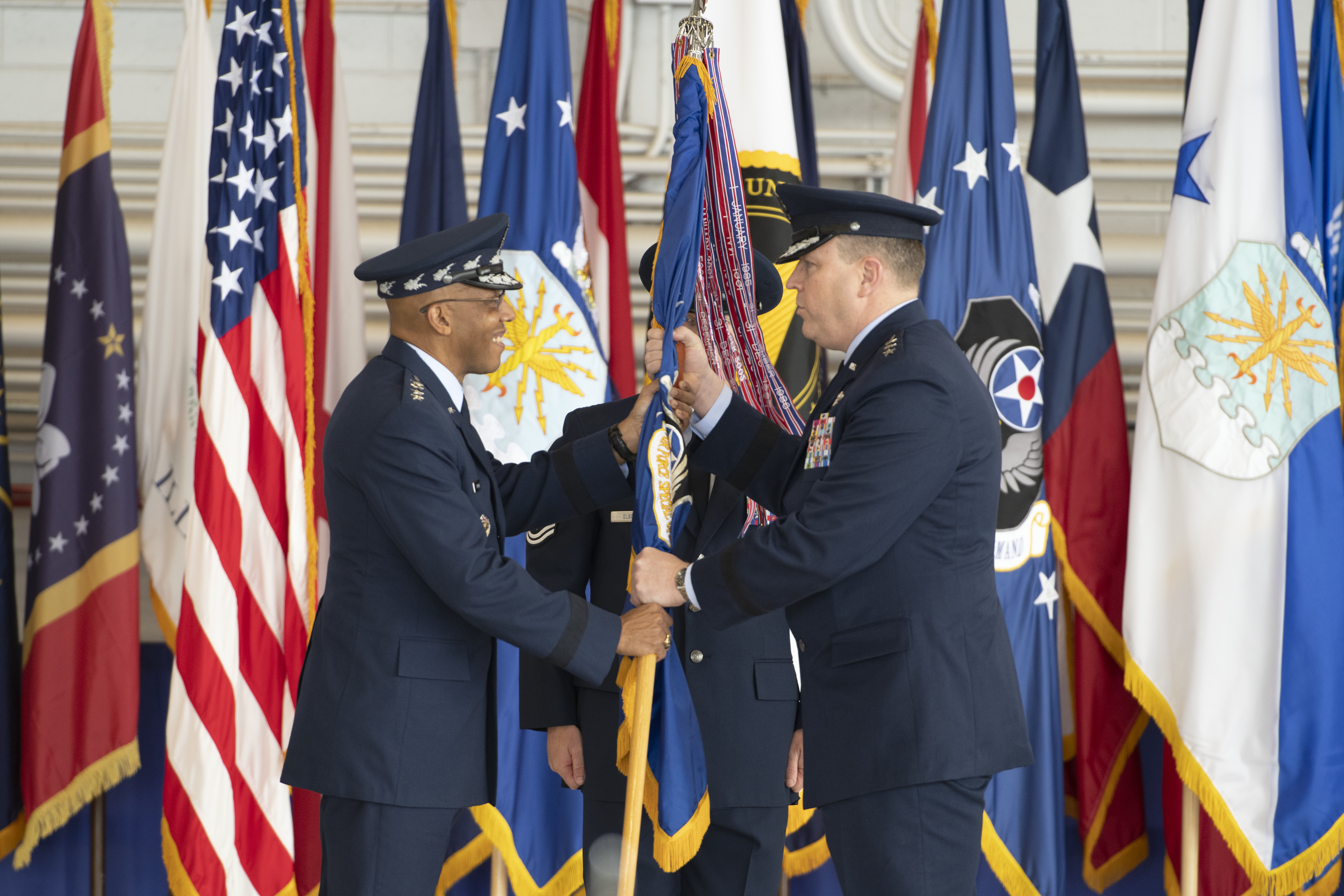
Bauernfeind assumes command of Air Force Special Operations Command on 9 December 2022

US Air Force Command Pilot Badge
United States Special Operations Command Badge
Office of the Secretary of Defense Identification Badge

Defense Superior Service Medal with one bronze oak leaf cluster
Legion of Merit with oak leaf cluster
Bronze Star Medal with two oak leaf clusters
Defense Meritorious Service Medal
Meritorious Service Medal with three oak leaf clusters
Air Medal with oak leaf cluster
Aerial Achievement Medal with oak leaf cluster
Air Force Commendation Medal with two oak leaf clusters
Joint Service Achievement Medal
Air Force Achievement Medal with two oak leaf clusters
Joint Meritorious Unit Award with four oak leaf clusters
Air Force Meritorious Unit Award with three oak leaf clusters
Air Force Outstanding Unit Award with "V" device, one silver and two bronze oak leaf clusters
Combat Readiness Medal with two oak leaf clusters
Air Force Recognition Ribbon with oak leaf cluster
National Defense Service Medal with one bronze service star
Afghanistan Campaign Medal with two service stars
Iraq Campaign Medal with service star
Global War on Terrorism Service Medal
Korea Defense Service Medal
Humanitarian Service Medal
Air and Space Campaign Medal
Air Force Overseas Long Tour Service Ribbon
Air Force Expeditionary Service Ribbon with gold frame and two oak leaf clusters
Air Force Longevity Service Award with one silver and two bronze oak leaf clusters
Small Arms Expert Marksmanship Ribbon with service star
Air Force Training Ribbon
NATO Medal for the former Yugoslavia

== Effective dates of promotions ==
Rank	Date
Second lieutenant	29 May 1991
First lieutenant	29 May 1993
Captain	29 May 1995
Major	1 March 2002
Lieutenant colonel	1 March 2006
Colonel	1 October 2009
Brigadier general	2 August 2015
Major general	1 August 2018
Lieutenant general	31 July 2020

Military offices
Preceded by Albert Elton	Commander of the 1st Special Operations Group; 2011–2013	Succeeded by ???
Preceded by Albert Elton	Commander of the 27th Special Operations Wing; 2013–2015	Succeeded by Benjamin R. Maitre
Preceded by Mark C. Schwartz	Deputy Commanding General of the NATO Special Operations Component Command and Special Operations Joint Task Force-Afghanistan; 2015–2016	Succeeded by ???
Preceded by E. John Deedrick	Commanding General of the Special Operations Command Korea; 2016–2019	Succeeded by Otto K. Liller
Preceded by James B. Linder	Chief of Staff of the United States Special Operations Command; 2019–2020	Succeeded by Collin P. Green
Preceded by James C. Slife	Vice Commander of the United States Special Operations Command; 2020–2022	Succeeded by Francis L. Donovan
Preceded by James C. Slife	Commander of the Air Force Special Operations Command; 2022–2024	Succeeded by Michael E. Conley
Preceded by Thomas P. Sherman; Acting	22nd Superintendent of the United States Air Force Academy; 2024–2026	Succeeded by Paul Moga
