= Michael E. Martin =

U.S. Air Force general

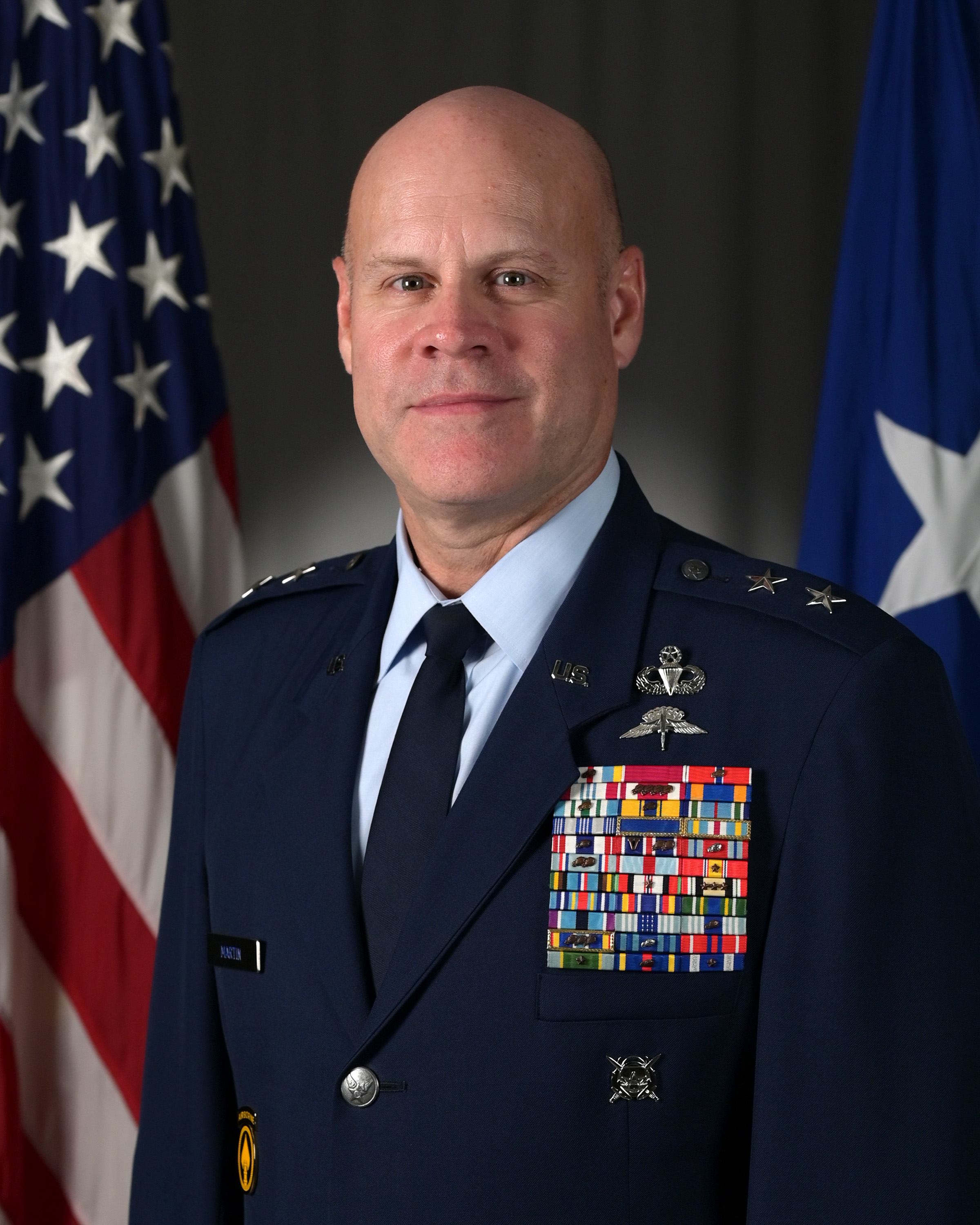
- Martin in 2025
- Military career
- Allegiance: United States
- Branch: United States Air Force
- Service years: 1993–present
- Rank: Major General
- Commands: Special Operations Command Korea; 24th Special Operations Wing; 724th Special Tactics Group; 21st Special Tactics Squadron
- Conflicts: War in Afghanistan; Iraq War
- Awards: Defense Superior Service Medal (2); Legion of Merit; Bronze Star Medal (2)

Michael E. Martin is a United States Air Force major general who has served as the director of operations of the United States Special Operations Command since July 2023. He most recently served as the commander of Special Operations Command Korea from June 23, 2021 to July 12, 2023. He previously served as the Director of Operations of the Air Force Special Operations Command and prior to that was the Deputy Commander of the NATO Special Operations Component Command-Afghanistan.

Military offices
Preceded by Matthew Wolfe Davidson	Commander of the 24th Special Operations Wing; 2016–2018	Succeeded by Claude K. Tudor
Preceded by James C. Johnson	Director of Air Force Resilience, Sexual Assault Prevention and Response, and Suicide Prevention Office; 2018–2019	Succeeded by Claude K. Tudor
Preceded by Otto K. Liller	Deputy Commanding General of the NATO Special Operations Component Command and Special Operations Joint Task Force-Afghanistan; 2019–2020	Succeeded by Matthew Wolfe Davidson
Preceded by Brenda P. Cartier	Director of Operations of the Air Force Special Operations Command; 2020–2021	Succeeded by Matthew Wolfe Davidson
Preceded by Otto K. Liller	Commander of Special Operations Command Korea; 2021–2023	Succeeded by Derek N. Lipson
Preceded by John W. Brennan Jr.	Director of Operations of the United States Special Operations Command; 2023–present	Incumbent
