= Special Operations Command Korea =

Sub-unified command of the U.S. Forces Korea

Special Operations Command, Korea
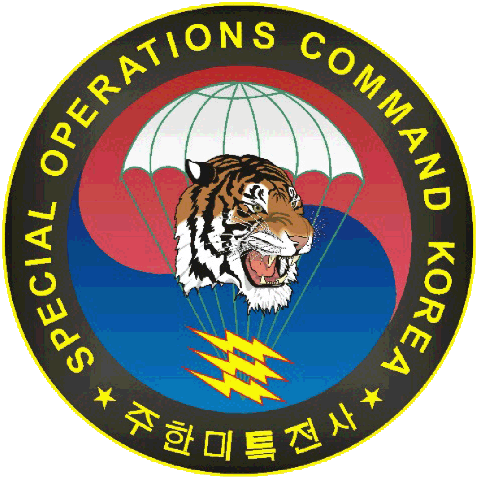
- SOCKOR Seal
- Country: United States of America
- Type: Special Operations
- Role: Serves as the headquarters for command and control of all U.S. Special Operations Forces (SOF) assets in Korea, develops supporting plans, and works together with the Republic of Korea Special Warfare Command (ROK SWC)
- Part of: United States Special Operations Command; United States Pacific Command
- Garrison/HQ: Camp Humphreys Pyeongtaek, South Korea
- Color of berets (U.S. Army Personnel): Tan Maroon Rifle green

Commanders
- Commander: BG Derek N. Lipson

Insignia
- Distinctive unit insignia (U.S. Army personnel)

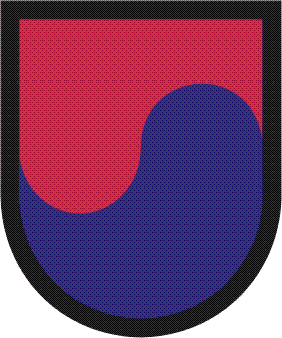
- Beret flash (U.S. Army Personnel)

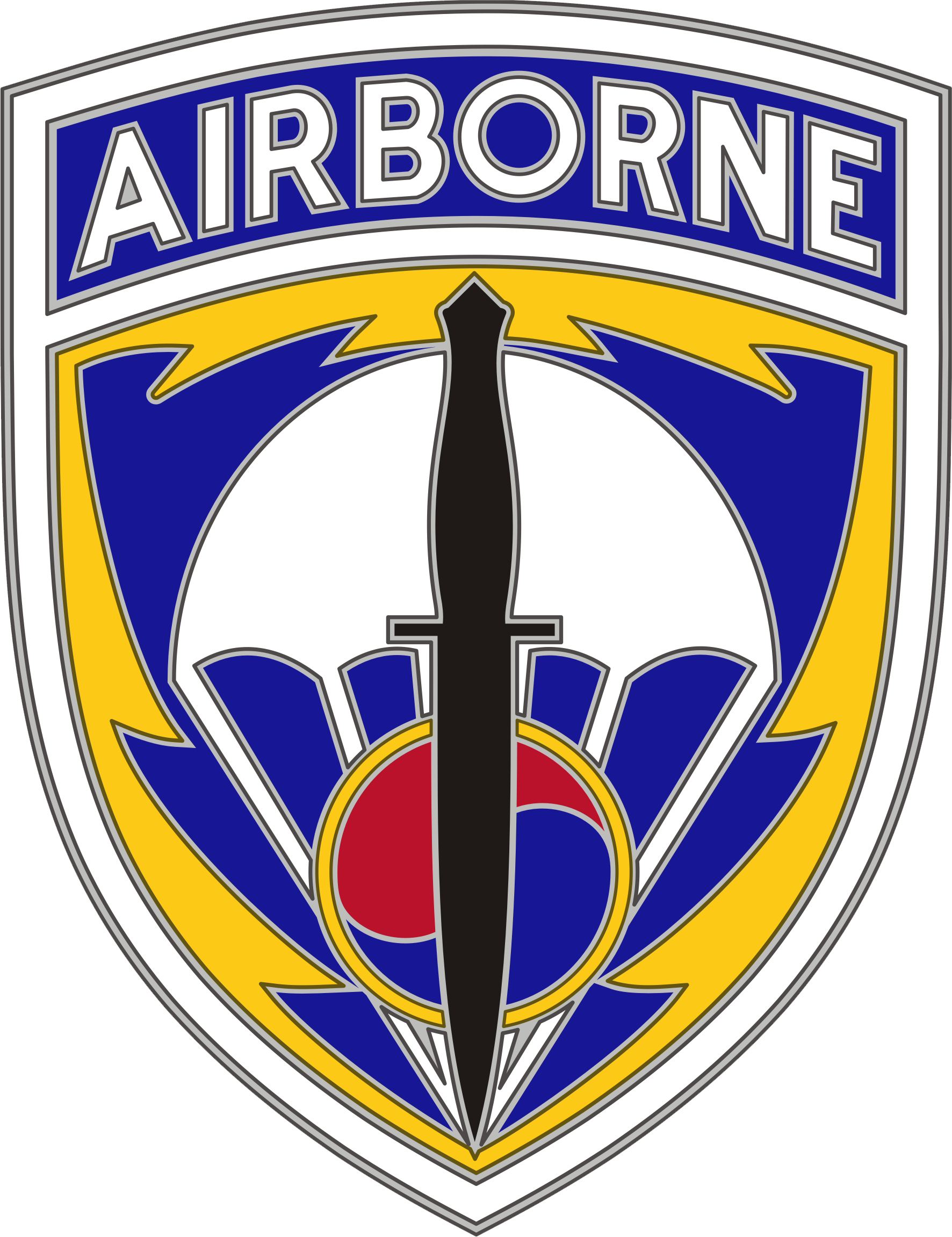
- Shoulder Sleeve Insignia (U.S. Army Personnel)

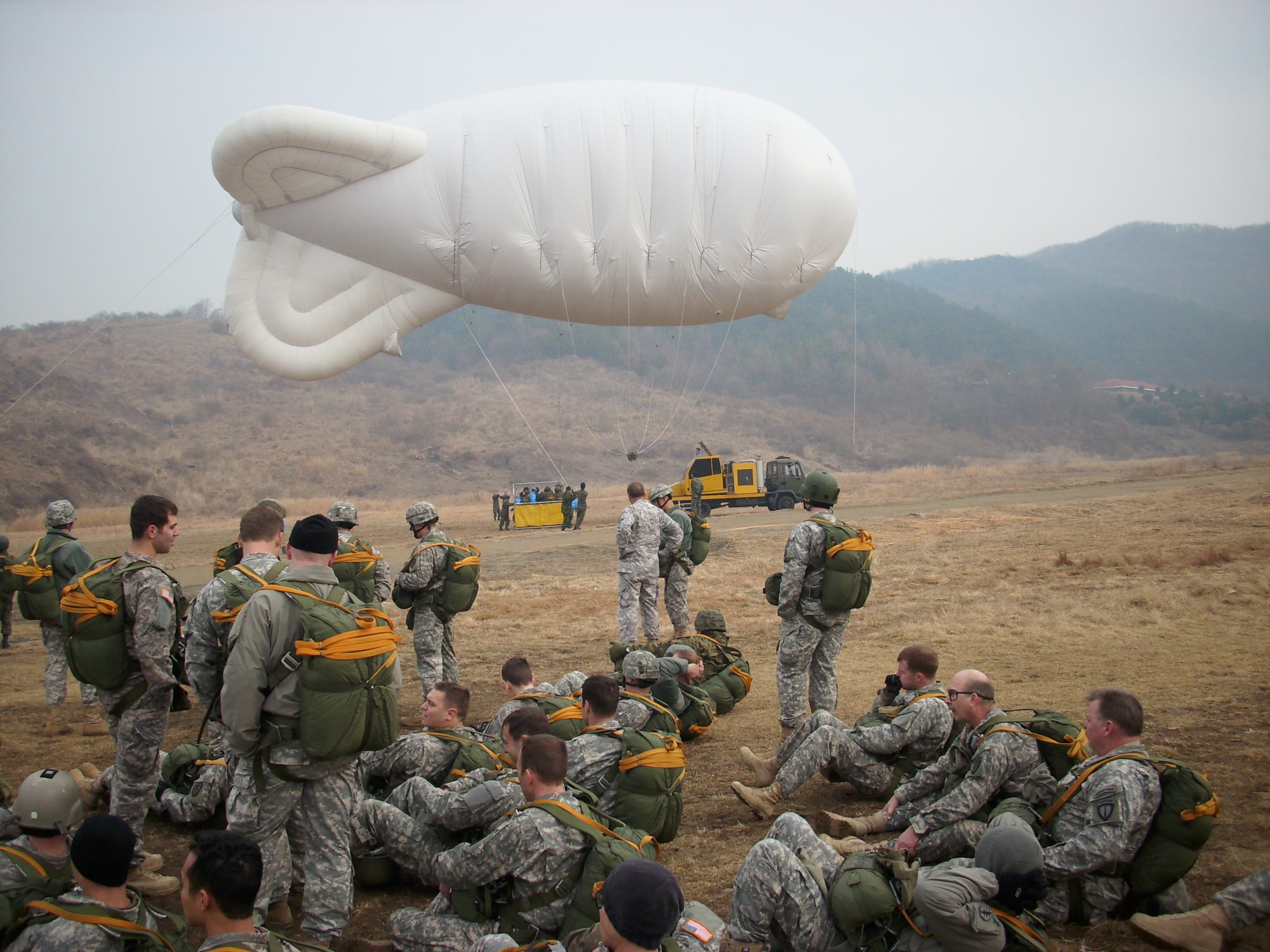
SOCKOR soldiers conduct airborne jumps with a helium blimp and gondola at the ROK Drop Zone on 5 March 2009 during Exercise Key Resolve 09.

The Special Operations Command Korea (SOCKOR) the United States (US) Theater Special Operations Command (TSOC) in the Republic of Korea (ROK), is a sub-unified command assigned under the combatant command (CCMD) of United States Special Operations Command (USSOCOM), who delegated operational command (OPCON) of SOCKOR to the U.S. Pacific Command (USPACOM) commander, who further delegated OPCON of SOCKOR to the United States Forces Korea (USFK) commander.

SOCKOR focuses on readiness and the ability to fight in defense of the Korean peninsula and the US-South Korea alliance. This is accomplished through several means, ranging from individual and unit readiness and training to continuous updates and validation of operational plans, and participation in Joint Chiefs of Staff meetings and other exercises.

== Mission ==
During armistice, crisis, and conflict, SOCKOR serves as the headquarters for command and control of all U.S. Special Operations Forces (SOF) assets in Korea, develops supporting plans, and works together with the Republic of Korea Special Warfare Command (ROK SWC) and United Nations (UN) SOF in support of the Commander, United Nations Command (UNC)/ Combined Forces Command (CFC)/ United States Forces Korea (USFK) in order to deter aggression and promote stability in the region. During wartime, SOCKOR combines with ROK SWC to form the Combined Unconventional Warfare Task Force (CUWTF) and the Commander, SOCKOR also becomes the United Nations Command Special Operations Component (UNCSOC) Commanding General to conduct special operations in support of the Commander, UNC/CFC/USFK efforts to defeat external threats and restore stability.

== History ==
Prior to 1988, management of Special Operations Forces in Korea fell to United States Forces Korea (USFK) Joint Operations (J3), Special Operations Division-Korea (SOD-K). The concept of a permanent TSOC in Korea began to take shape in 1983, growing on 1 October 1988 to the creation of a special operations element within the USFK J3. Colonel James Estep, the first Commander, also served as Chief, J3 SOD-K and Deputy Commander, Combined Operations (C-3,) SOD-K. This dual-hatted command continued until July 1995. Colonel Skip Booth separated this special operations element from USFK J3 SOD, establishing it as an independently functioning command. The name of this element changed to SOCKOR to begin to align with the other TSOCS, and the staff began transforming SOCKOR into a separate sub-unified command under the operational control of the Commander, United States Forces Korea (COMUSFK). In 2000, SOCKOR was recognized as a fully operational TSOC and the billet for the commander of SOCKOR was elevated to Brigadier General, mirroring the other TSOCs. SOCKOR has been commanded by a General Officer since 2000.

Since inception, SOCKOR has been the only TSOC in which U.S. and host nation SOF are institutionally organized for combined operations. SOCKOR and ROK SWC regularly train in their combined roles, while SOCKOR’s Special Forces Detachment-39 works as the full-time liaison between ROK SF and U.S. SOF.

In armistice, the CG of SOCKOR is responsible for the planning, training, and execution of all U.S. SOF activities in Korea. The SOCKOR CG also serves as the senior advisor to COMUSFK regarding all U.S. SOF issues. If the armistice fails, SOCKOR and ROK SWC will combine to establish the Combined Unconventional Warfare Task Force under the Combined Forces Command. SOCKOR is then also designated as the United Nations Command Special Operations Component under the United Nations Command, with the SOCKOR Commanding General serving as the UNCSOC Commanding General.

== Headquarters ==
SOCKOR is located at Camp Humphreys in Pyeongtaek, South Korea.

== List of commanders ==
- 12 Brig Gen Richard Haddad, October 2008 to October 2010
- 13: Neil H. Tolley, October 2010- October 2012
- 14: Eric P. Wendt, October 2012 to April 2014
- 15: BG E. John Deedrick, April 2014 to April 2016
- 16: Maj Gen Tony D. Bauernfeind, April 2016 to June 2019
- 17: BG Otto K. Liller, July 2019 to June 2021
- 18: Maj Gen Michael E. Martin, June 2021 to June 2023
- 19: Brig Gen Derek N. Lipson, June 2023 to present

== Unit decorations ==
The unit awards depicted below are for Headquarters, Special Operations Command Korea. Award for unit decorations do not apply to any subordinate organizations, commands or any other activities unless the orders specifically address them.

Award streamer	Award	Dates	Notes
	Joint Meritorious Unit Award	1 September 1999 – 1 May 2002	
	Joint Meritorious Unit Award	1 May 2004 – 31 March 2008	
	Joint Meritorious Unit Award	10 March 2012 – 20 February 2015	
