= Claude Tudor =

U.S. Air Force general

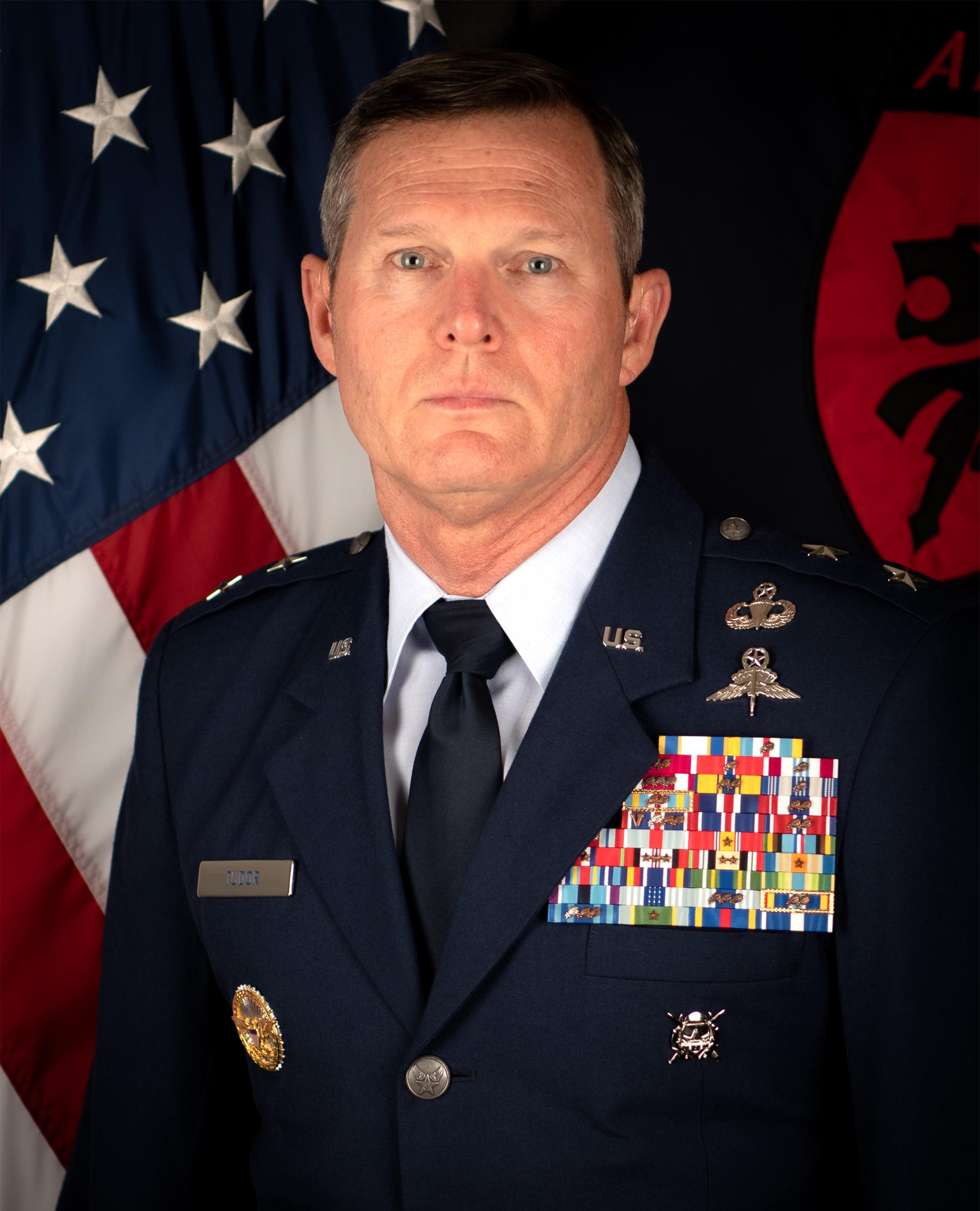
- Official portrait, 2025
- Born: Merritt Island, Florida, U.S.
- Military career
- Allegiance: United States
- Branch: United States Air Force
- Service years: 1992–present
- Rank: Major General
- Commands: Special Operations Command Africa; Combined Special Operations Joint Task Force-Levant; 24th Special Operations Wing; 368th Expeditionary Air Support Operations Group; 321st Special Tactics Squadron
- Awards: Air Force Distinguished Service Medal; Defense Superior Service Medal; Legion of Merit (2)

Claude K. Tudor Jr. is a United States Air Force major general who has served as the commander of Special Operations Command Africa since June 3, 2025. He most recently served as the director for operations and cyber of United States Africa Command from 2023 to 2025. He most recently served as the commander of Combined Special Operations Joint Task Force-Levant. Prior to that, he served as the Chief of Staff of the Pacific Air Forces. Previously, he served as the Director of Air Force Resilience of the United States Air Force and, prior to that, he was the Commander of the 24th Special Operations Wing.

In March 2023, Tudor was nominated for promotion to major general.

Military offices
Preceded by Michael E. Martin	Commander of the 24th Special Operations Wing; 2018–2019	Succeeded by Matthew S. Allen
Preceded by Michael E. Martin	Director of Air Force Resilience of the United States Air Force; 2019–2021	Succeeded by Debra A. Lovette
Preceded by Jennifer Short	Chief of Staff of the Pacific Air Forces; 2021–2022	Succeeded by Brandon D. Parker
Preceded by Isaac Peltier	Commander of Combined Special Operations Joint Task Force-Levant; 2022–2023	Succeeded by Philip J. Ryan
Preceded by David J. Francis	Director for Operations of the United States Africa Command; 2023–2025	Vacant
Preceded by Ronald A. Foy	Commander of Special Operations Command Africa; 2025–present	Incumbent
