= 24th Special Operations Wing =

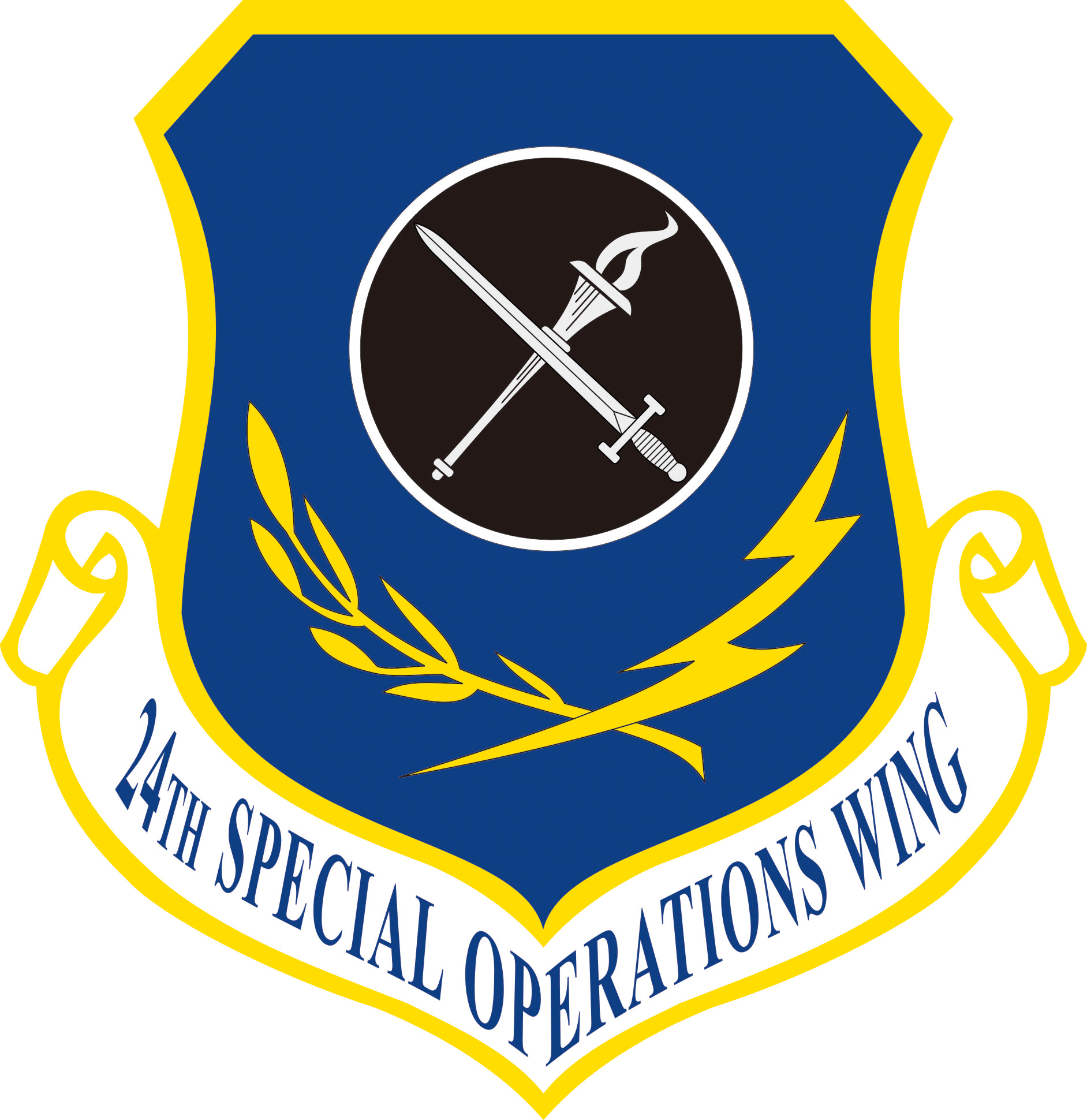
- 24th Special Operations Wing emblem (Note: Approved 1968, reinstated 2012.)
- Active: 1942–1944; 1946–1948; 1967–1987; 1989–1991; 1992–1999; 2012–2025
- Country: United States
- Branch: United States Air Force
- Role: Special operations
- Garrison/HQ: Hurlburt Field
- Motto: Los Professionales (Spanish for 'The Professionals')
- Engagements: War in Afghanistan
- Decorations: Air Force Outstanding Unit Award

Insignia
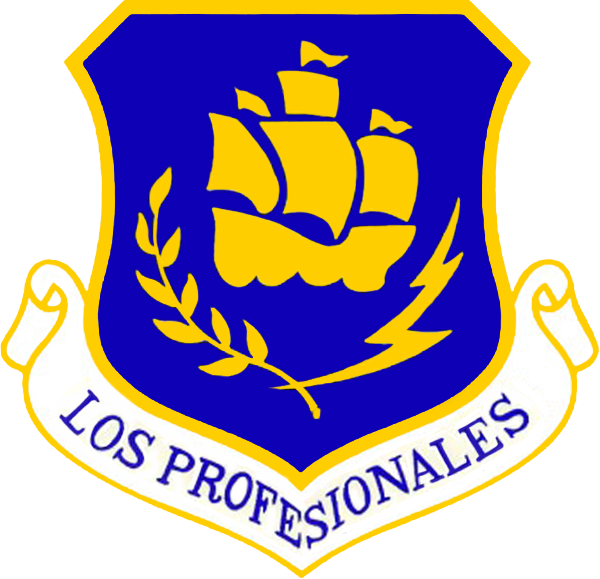
- 24th Composite Wing emblem (Note: Approved 16 August 1994.) (Note: Azure, a stylized square-rigged ship of three mast sails set, flag and pennants flotant sailing to sinister above an arced olive branch to dexter and an arced lightning flash to sinister conjoined in base Or, all within a diminished bordure of the like [color].)

The 24th Special Operations Wing was a tactical air/ground integration force of the United States Air Force that was activated on 12 June 2012 and which was inactivated on 16 May 2025. Its headquarters was at Hurlburt Field, Florida and it had component groups located in North Carolina, Georgia and Washington. It was the third special operations wing in Air Force Special Operations Command (AFSOC).

The 24th Wing was previously assigned to Twelfth Air Force, stationed at Howard Air Force Base, Panama. It was inactivated on 1 November 1999. The inactivation of the 24th Wing and the closure of Howard Air Force Base ended an 82-year United States Air Force presence in Panama, which began with the formation of the 7th Aero Squadron on 29 March 1917.

== Mission ==
The 24th Special Operations Wing was the only special tactics wing in the Air Force. Its primary mission was to conduct global air, space, and cyber-enabled special operations. The 24th was U.S. Special Operations Command's tactical air/ground integration force and the Air Force's special operations ground force that led global access, precision strike, personnel recovery and battlefield surgery operations.

24th Wing elements included:

- United States Air Force Combat Control Teams - who are FAA-certified air traffic controllers and establish air control and provide combat support.
- United States Air Force Pararescues - primary mission is personnel recovery in hostile areas and are expert combat medical professionals.
- United States Air Force Special Reconnaissance – Special Reconnaissance Airmen are trained in surveillance and reconnaissance, electronic warfare (EW), long-range precision engagement and target interdiction, small unmanned aircraft systems.
- United States Air Force Tactical Air Control Party - provide precision terminal attack control and terminal attack guidance of U.S. and coalition fixed- and rotary-wing close air support aircraft, artillery, and naval gunfire; establish and maintain command and control (C2) communications; and advise ground commanders on the best use of air power.

Core capabilities encompassed airfield reconnaissance, assessment, and control; personnel recovery; joint terminal attack control; battlefield surgery; and environmental reconnaissance.

== Organization ==
Prior to its inactivation, the wing was organized as follows:

- 24th Special Operations Wing, Hurlburt Field, FL
  - Special Tactics Training Squadron, Hurlburt Field, FL
  - 720th Special Tactics Group, Hurlburt Field, FL
    - 21st Special Tactics Squadron, Pope Army Airfield, NC
    - 22nd Special Tactics Squadron, Joint Base Lewis-McChord, (McChord Air Force Base), WA
    - 23rd Special Tactics Squadron, Hurlburt Field, FL
    - 26th Special Tactics Squadron, Cannon Air Force Base, NM
    - 720th Operations Support Squadron, Hurlburt Field, FL
  - 724th Special Tactics Group, Pope Army Airfield, NC
    - 17th Special Tactics Squadron, Fort Benning, GA
    - 24th Special Tactics Squadron, operationally assigned to Joint Special Operations Command, Pope Army Airfield, NC
    - 724th Operations Support Squadron, Pope Army Airfield, N.C.
    - 724th Intelligence Squadron, Pope Army Airfield, NC
    - 724th Special Tactics Support Squadron, Pope Army Airfield, N.C.

== History ==
=== World War II ===
The 24th Composite Wing was activated on 25 December 1942 to control all Army Air Forces units on Iceland and subsequently disestablished in June 1944.

=== Post war era ===
From August 1946 until replaced by the Antilles Air Division in July 1948 the wing supervised large numbers of major and minor bases and Air Force units in the Caribbean area from Puerto Rico to British Guiana.

=== Panama and special operations ===
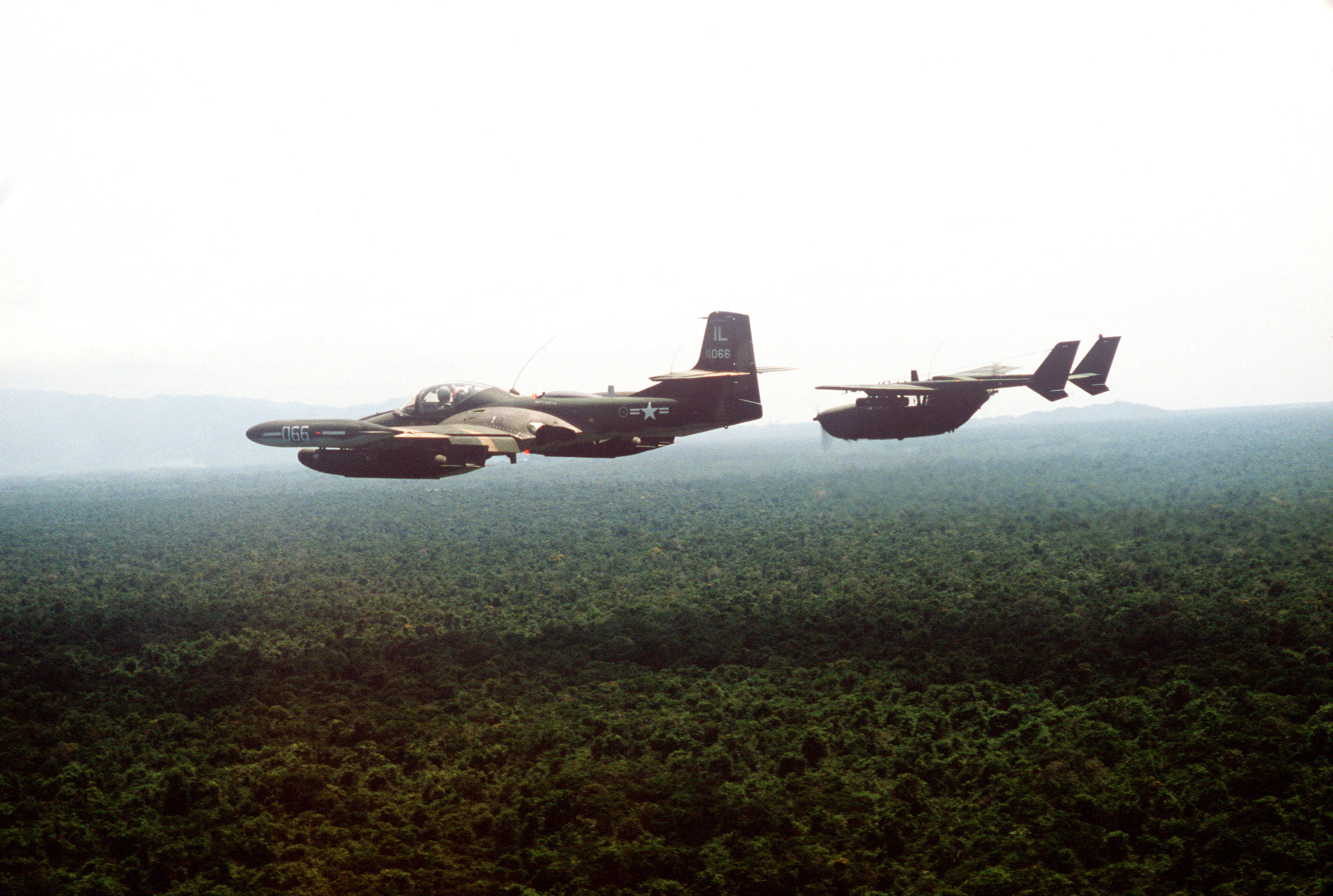
A 24th TASS O-2A and an Illinois ANG OA-37B over Honduras, 1984.

It was organized once more in November 1967 in the Panama Canal Zone, replacing the 5700th Air Base Wing. The wing assumed operation and maintenance responsibilities for Howard and Albrook Air Force Bases and a special operations mission that included air transport, paramilitary operations, exercise participation, civic actions in Central and South America, search and rescue missions, humanitarian operations, mercy missions, aeromedical evacuation, and support of Army Special Forces, U.S. military assistance units, and training of Latin American air forces. From its activation in 1967 until mid-1972, the 24th Wing operated the USAF Tropic Survival School at Albrook. It also controlled various rotational detachments from 1967–1987. The wing lost Bell UH–1 Iroquois helicopters and control of search and rescue missions in the area after 1 March 1983. The wing inactivated on 31 January 1987, its subordinate components were reassigned directly to the USAF Southern Air Division.

The 24th was reactivated on 1 January 1989, as the 24th Composite Wing again assuming responsibilities for Howard and Albrook. The wing flew combat sorties in the Invasion of Panama, December 1989 – January 1990. The wing trained foreign and domestic pilots in forward air control. It again flew search and rescue, aeromedical airlift and disaster relief missions in the Latin American region from 1989–1990. Members of the wing deployed to Southwest Asia to provide air liaison support between ground forces and air operations from 1 October 1990 – February 1991. When the 24th Composite Wing inactivated in 1991, its assets were placed under Air Forces in Panama.

On 11 February 1992 the wing again reactivated as the 24th Wing and became the ranking USAF organization in Panama and replaced the previous command and division-level Air Force host units. In June 1992, it began operating the only Learjet C-21, Boeing CT-43 Bobcat, Alenia C-27 Spartan and special mission Lockheed C-130 Hercules in Air Combat Command. The wing provided control and support to multi-service units directed by United States Southern Command and United States Southern Air Force from 1992–1999. Missions included counter-narcotics operations, aerial command and control, intratheater airlift, security assistance and defense of the Panama Canal.

On 1 April 1997 the 310th Airlift Squadron was reassigned to Air Mobility Command's 21st Air Force. The 24th Wing was inactivated on 1 November 1999 with the closure of Howard and its turnover to the Panamanian government.

=== Special tactics ===
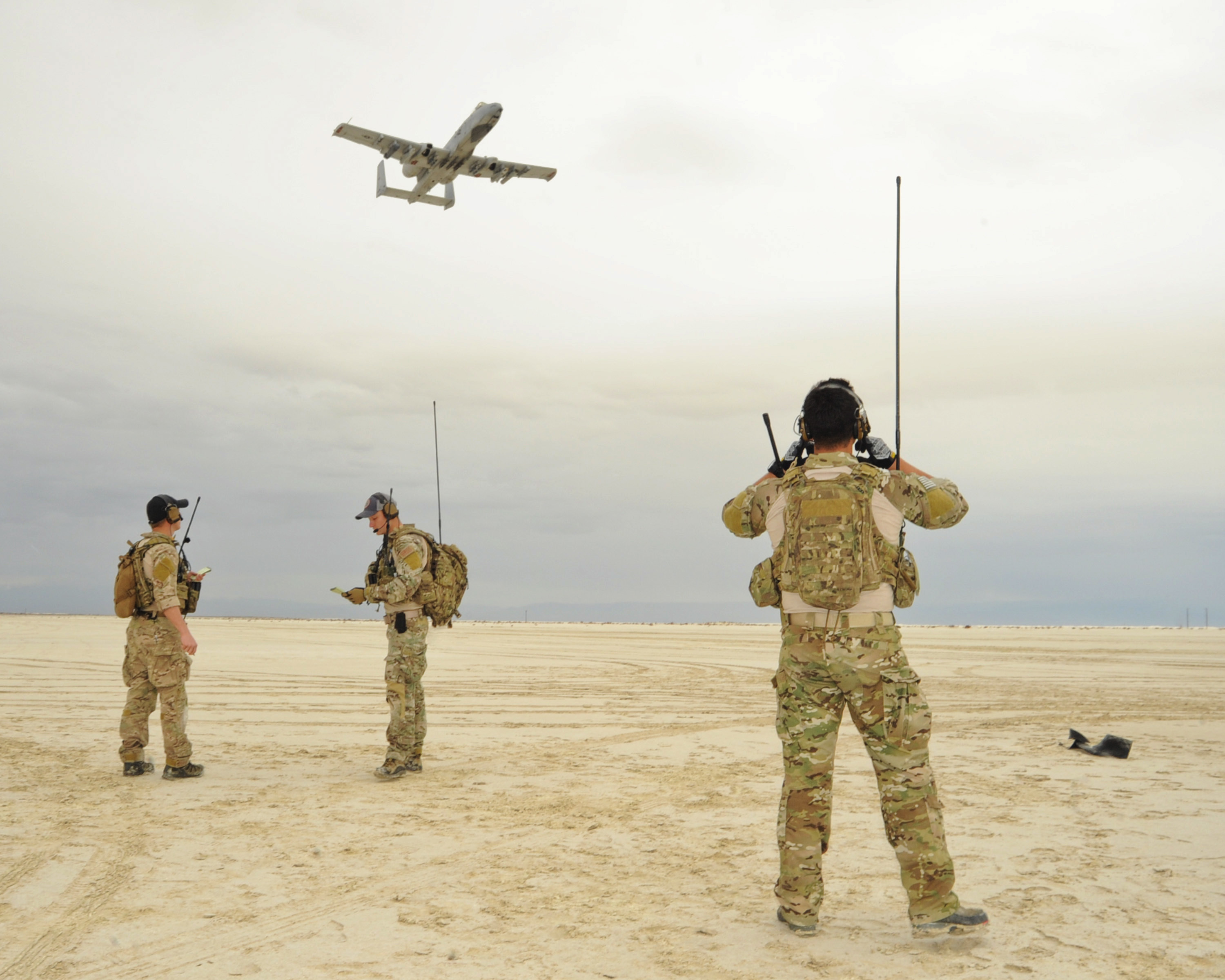
U.S. Air Force combat controllers from the 23rd Special Tactics Squadron, Hurlburt Field, Fla., perform air traffic control radio transmissions to an A-10C Thunderbolt II pilot of the 354th Fighter Squadron, Davis-Monthan Air Force Base, Ariz., approaching an austere landing strip during training at White Sands Missile Range, N.M., Dec. 4, 2014. The combat controllers set up the landing strip as part of their initial and reoccurring training. (U.S. Air Force photo by Airman 1st Class Chris Massey/Released)

When the wing was reactivated in June 2012 it comprised the 720th Special Tactics Group and the Special Tactics Training Squadron based at Hurlburt Field, the 724th Special Tactics Group based at Pope Army Airfield. The Special Tactics Squadrons are made up of Special Tactics Officers, Combat Controllers, Combat Rescue Officers, Pararescuemen, Special Reconnaissance (formerly Special Operations Weather Technicians), Air Liaison Officers, Tactical Air Control Party operators, and a number of combat support airmen which comprise 58 Air Force specialties.

Special tactics airmen often embed with United States special forces including Navy SEALs, Army Green Berets and Rangers to provide various skills from combat air support to medical aid and personnel recovery.

== Commanders ==
24th Composite Wing (Special)

- Brig Gen George P. Tourtellot, 25 Dec 1942
- Brig Gen Early E. W. Duncan, 5–15 Jun 1944

24th Composite Wing

- Col George H. Steel, 25 Aug 1946
- Brig Gen John A. Samford, 6 Mar 1947–28 Jul 1948
- Col Richard Jones, 8 Nov 1967
- Col James G. Silliman, 13 Dec 1967

24th Special Operations Wing

- Col Joseph A. Stuart, Jr., 14 Jun 1968
- Col Leslie E. Gaskins, 1 Jun 1971

24th Special Operations Group

- Col Robert S. Beale, 30 Mar 1974
- Col William E. Roth, 15 Aug 1975
- Col Paul M. Davis, 1 Jan 1976

24th Composite Wing

- Col Alton J. Thogersen, 16 Jan 1976
- Col Robert E. Patterson, 5 Jan 1979
- Col Robert R. Reed, 10 Jun 1980
- Col Wayne R. Topp, 5 Oct 1982
- Col Loren E. Timm, 2 Jul 1984
- Col Harold E. Watson, 3 Dec 1985–31 Jan 1987
- Col Lansford E. Trapp, Jr., 17 Jan 1989
- Col David J. McCloud, 25 Jun 1990–15 Feb 1991

24th Wing

- Brig Gen David Oakes, 11 Feb 1992
- Brig Gen David A. Sawyer, 13 Jul 1992
- Brig Gen Richard E. Brown III, 13 Jun 1994
- Brig Gen Randall M. Schmidt, 5 Sep 1995
- Col Michael N. Schulman (temporary), 1 Aug-2 Sep 1997
- Col Gregory L. Trebon, 3 Sep 1997
- Col Roger T. Corbin, 3 Jun-1 Nov 1999

24th Special Operations Wing

- Col. Robert G. Armfield June 2012 – July 2014
- Col. Matthew Wolfe Davidson July 2014 – July 2016
- Col. Michael Martin July 2016 – March 2018
- Col. Claude Tudor, Jr. March 2018 – June 2019
- Col. Matt Allen June 2019 – June 2021
- Col. Jason Daniels June 2021 – June 2023
- Col. Daniel L. Magruder, Jr. June 2023 – May 2025

== Lineage ==
- Established as the 24th Composite Wing (Special) on 19 November 1942

Activated on 25 December 1942
Disestablished on 15 June 1944

- Reestablished as 24th Composite Wing on 5 August 1946

Activated on 25 August 1946
Inactivated on 28 July 1948

- Activated on 30 October 1967 (not organized)

Organized on 8 November 1967
Redesignated 24th Air Commando Wing on 15 March 1968
Redesignated 24th Special Operations Wing on 15 July 1968
Redesignated 24th Special Operations Group on 30 June 1972
Redesignated 24th Composite Group on 15 November 1973
Redesignated 24th Composite Wing on 1 January 1976
Inactivated on 31 January 1987

- Activated on 1 January 1989

Inactivated on 15 February 1991
Redesignated 24th Wing on 1 February 1992
Activated on 11 February 1992
Inactivated on 1 November 1999

- Redesignated 24th Special Operations Wing

Activated on 12 June 2012
Inactivated on 16 May 2025

=== Assignments ===
- Iceland Base Command, US Army Forces, Iceland, 25 December 1942 – 15 June 1944
- Sixth Air Force, 25 August 1946 – 28 July 1948
- United States Air Forces Southern Command, 30 October 1967
- United States Air Force Southern Air Division, 1 January 1976 – 31 January 1987
- 830th Air Division, 1 January 1989 – 15 February 1991
- Twelfth Air Force, 11 February 1992 – 1 November 1999
- Air Force Special Operations Command, 12 June 2012 – present

=== Components ===
Groups

- 24th Operations Group: 11 February 1992 – 1 November 1999
- 130th Special Operations Group: attached 30 January 1971 – 27 February 1971, 5–14 February 1973
- 134th Anti-Aircraft Artillery Group: attached 1 November 1943 – 15 June 1944
- 143d Air Commando Group: attached 8 February – 9 March 1969
- 342d Composite Group: 25 December 1942 – 18 March 1944
- 720th Special Tactics Group: 12 June 2012 – present
- 724th Special Tactics Group: 12 June 2012 – present

Squadrons

- 33d Fighter Squadron: 18 March 1944 – 15 June 1944
- 91st Reconnaissance Squadron: 12 January 1948 – 26 July 1948
- 330th Transport Squadron: 25 August 1946 – 15 October 1946
- 24th Air Transport: 15 March 1968 – 30 June 1971
- 605th Air Commando Squadron (later 605th Special Operations Squadron): 8 November 1967 – 30 April 1972
- 24th Special Operations Squadron (later 24th Composite Squadron; 24th Tactical Air Support Squadron): 18 March 1969 – 1 July 1975; 1 January 1976 – 31 January 1987; 1 January 1989 – 15 February 1991
- Special Tactics Training Squadron: 12 June 2012 – present

Detachments

- Det A, Fighter Command (IBC, US Army Forces, Iceland): attached 12 Feb – 15 June 1944
- Det, 314 Troop Carrier Group: attached 1 October 1946 – 26 July 1948
- TAC A-7 Rotational Element (various detachments): attached 13 November 1972 – 30 September 1978
- ANG A-7 Rotational Element (various detachments): attached 1 October 1978 – 31 January 1987
- ANG A-10 Rotational Element (various detachments): attached Feb–Apr 1985
- TAC C-130 Rotational Element (various detachments): attached 8 November 1967 – 30 November 1974
- MAC C-130 Rotational Element (various detachments): attached 1 December 1974 – 30 September 1977
- AFRES and ANG C-130 Rotational Element (various detachments): attached 1 Oct 1977 – c. 1 December 1984

=== Stations ===
- Camp Olympia, Reykjavík, Iceland, 25 December 1942
- Camp Tripoli, Reykjavik, Iceland, 13 March – 15 June 1944
- Borinquen Field (later Borinquen Army Air Field, Borinquen Field, Ramey Air Force Base), Puerto Rico, 25 August 1946 – 28 July 1948
- Albrook Air Force Base, Panama Canal Zone, 8 November 1967
- Howard Air Force Base, Panama Canal Zone, 3 January 1968 – 31 January 1987
- Howard Air Force Base, Panama Canal Zone (later Panama), 1 January 1989 – 15 February 1991
- Howard Air Force Base, Panama, 11 February 1992 – 1 November 1999
- Hurlburt Field, Florida, 12 June 2012 – present

=== Aircraft ===
The 24th Special Operations Wing currently does not have any aircraft; it is composed of ground operators.

- Lockheed P-38 Lightning (1942–1944)
- Bell P-39 Airacobra (1942–1943)
- Curtiss P-40 Warhawk (1943–1944)
- Republic P-47 Thunderbolt (1944)
- Boeing B-17 Flying Fortress (1946–1948)
- Douglas C-47 Skytrain (1946–1948, 1967–1970)
- Douglas C-54 Skymaster (1947–1948, 1967–1972)
- Beechcraft F-2 Expeditor (1948)
- Douglas A-26 Invader (1967–1968)
- Curtiss C-46 Commando (1967–1968)
- Douglas C-118 Liftmaster (1967–1971)
- Lockheed C-130 Hercules (1967–1984, 1992–1999)
- Convair C-131 Samaritan (1967–1968)
- Sikorsky CH-3 (1967–1970)
- Sikorsky H-19 (1967–1969)
- North American T-28 Trojan (1967–1970)
- Convair VT-29 (1967–1970)
- Helio U-10 Courier (1967–1971)
- Bell UH-1 Iroquois (1967–1983)
- Cessna A-37 Dragonfly (1967–1972)
- Grumman HU-16 Albatross (1969)
- Fairchild C-123 Provider (1970–1975)
- Fairchild C-119 Flying Boxcar (1971, 1973)
- Cessna O-2 Skymaster (1971–1986)
- LTV A-7 Corsair II (1972–1987)
- Fairchild Republic A-10 Thunderbolt II (1985)
- Cessna OA-37 Dragonfly (1985–1991)
- Learjet C-21 (1992–1999)
- Boeing T-43 Bobcat (1992–1999)
- Alenia C-27 Spartan (1992–1999)
