= Michael E. Conley =

U.S. Air Force general officer

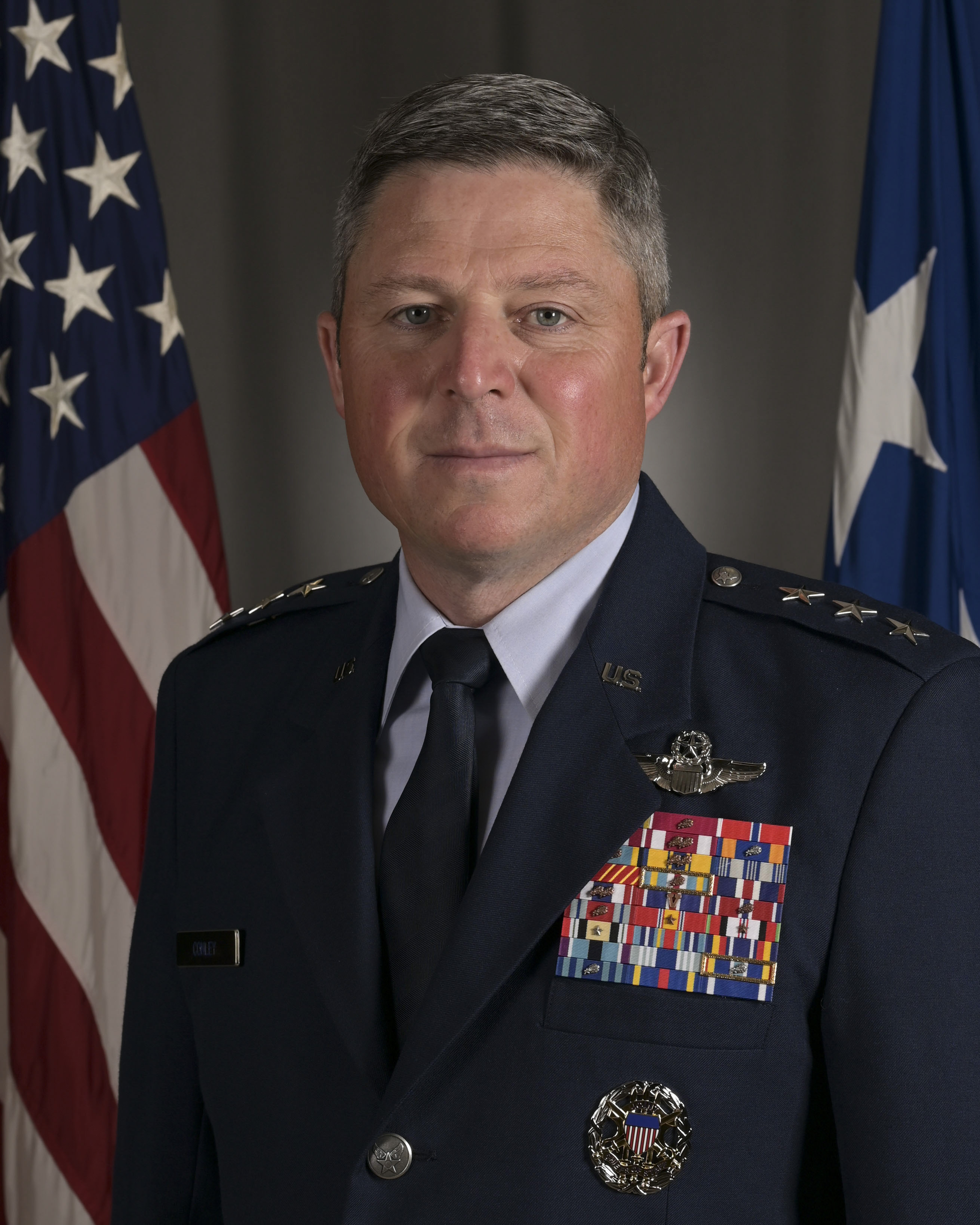
- Born: Geneva, New York, U.S.
- Military career
- Allegiance: United States
- Branch: United States Air Force
- Service years: 1996–present
- Rank: Lieutenant General
- Commands: Air Force Special Operations Command; 1st Special Operations Wing; 58th Operations Support Squadron
- Awards: Air Force Distinguished Service Medal; Legion of Merit (2)

Michael Edward Conley is a United States Air Force lieutenant general who has served as the commander of Air Force Special Operations Command since 2 July 2024. Conley most recently served as the director of operations of the Air Force Special Operations Command from 2023 to 2024. He also served as the director of strategic plans, requirements, and programs of the Air Mobility Command from 2022 to 2023, and as the deputy commander of the Combined Force Space Component Command from 2020 to 2022. Prior to that, he was commander of the 1st Special Operations Wing of the United States Air Force from 2018 to 2020.

Conley was born and raised in Geneva, New York. He was commissioned to the U.S. Air Force in May 1996 after graduating from the United States Air Force Academy. He also completed pilot training in 1998, and since then, has flown the UH-1N and MH-53 helicopters, and the CV-22 tilt-rotor aircraft. Also during his Air Force career, Conley served as special assistant to the chairman of the Joint Chiefs of Staff. In 2005, he was named Air Force Special Operations Pilot of the Year. Conley holds three master's degrees, including a degree in national security and strategic studies from the Naval War College.

== Education ==
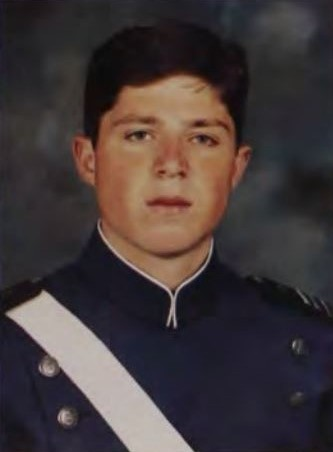
Conley in the United States Air Force Academy

- 1996 Bachelor of Science, U.S. Air Force Academy, Colorado
- 2000 Squadron Officer's School, Maxwell AFB, Alabama
- 2004 M.S. in management, University of Maryland, University College, Maryland
- 2006 Air Command and Staff College, by correspondence
- 2008 M.A. in communication, George Mason University, Virginia (AF Intern Program)
- 2010 Air War College, by correspondence
- 2014 M.A. in national security and strategic studies, U.S. Naval War College, Rhode Island
- 2017 Air Force Enterprise Leadership Seminar, Kenan-Flagler Business School, University of North Carolina, North Carolina

== Assignments ==
- 1997–1997, student pilot, T-37, Vance AFB, Oklahoma
- 1997–1998, student pilot, UN-1H, Ft. Rucker, Alabama
- 1998–2001, UH-1N IP/executive officer, 1st Helicopter Squadron, Andrews AFB, Maryland
- 2001–2002, student pilot, MH-53J, 551 SOS, Kirtland AFB, New Mexico
- 2002–2004, MH-53J/M instructor pilot, 20 SOS, Hurlburt Field, Florida
- 2004–2006, MH-53M evaluator pilot/flight commander, 21st SOS, RAF Mildenhall, United Kingdom
- 2006–2007, assistant operations officer, 352 OSS, RAF Mildenhall, United Kingdom
- 2007–2008, AF Intern Program-Strategic Communication, George Mason University, Fairfax, Virginia
- 2008–2009, chief of operations team, SAF/PA, Headquarters U.S. Air Force, Arlington, Virginia
- 2009–2011, chief of wing safety/CV-22 pilot, 1 SOW, Hurlburt Field, Florida
- 2011–2013, commander, 58 OSS, Kirtland AFB, New Mexico
- 2013–2014, student, U.S. Naval War College, Newport, Rhode Island
- 2014–2015, branch chief, Joint Staff, J-7, Joint Lessons Learned Division, Pentagon, Arlington, Virginia
- 2015–2016, deputy director, CAG/special assistant to the CJCS, Pentagon, Arlington, Virginia
- 2016–2018, vice commander, 27 SOW, Cannon AFB, New Mexico
- 2018–2020, commander, 1 SOW, Hurlburt Field, Florida
- 2020–2022, deputy combined force space component commander, U.S. Space Command, Vandenberg AFB, California
- 2022–2023, director of strategy, plans, requirements, and programs, Headquarters Air Mobility Command, Scott AFB, Illinois
- 2023–2024, director of operations, Headquarters Air Force Special Operations Command, Hurlburt Field, Florida
- 2024–present, commander, Air Force Special Operations Command, Hurlburt Field, Florida

== Awards and decorations ==
- Legion of Merit with oak leaf cluster
- Bronze Star
- Defense Meritorious Service Medal
- Meritorious Service Medal with two oak leaf clusters
- Air Medal with five oak leaf clusters
- Aerial Achievement Medal with six oak leaf clusters
- Air Force Commendation Medal with two oak leaf clusters
- Air Force Achievement Medal
- Air Force Combat Action Medal
- Humanitarian Service Medal
- 2005 Air Force Special Operations Command Pilot of the Year

== Effective dates of promotion ==
Conley was nominated for the rank of brigadier general on January 9, 2020, and was sworn in June 2020.

Rank	Date
Second lieutenant	May 1996
First lieutenant	May 1998
Captain	May 2000
Major	May 2006
Lieutenant colonel	March 2010
Colonel	April 2016
Brigadier general	June 2020
Lieutenant general	July 2024

Military offices
Preceded by Tom Palenske	Commander of the 1st Special Operations Wing; 2018–2020	Succeeded by Jocelyn J. Schermerhorn
Preceded by Matthew Wolfe Davidson	Vice Commander of the Combined Force Space Component Command; 2020–2022	Succeeded by Zachary S. Warakomski
Preceded by Kyle Kremer	Director of Strategic Plans, Requirements, and Programs of the Air Mobility Command; 2022–2023	Succeeded by Albert G. Miller
Preceded by Jocelyn J. Schermerhorn	Director of Operations of the Air Force Special Operations Command; 2023–2024	Succeeded by ???
Preceded by Tony D. Bauernfeind	Commander of the Air Force Special Operations Command; 2024–present	Incumbent
