= Matthew Wolfe Davidson =

U.S. Air Force general

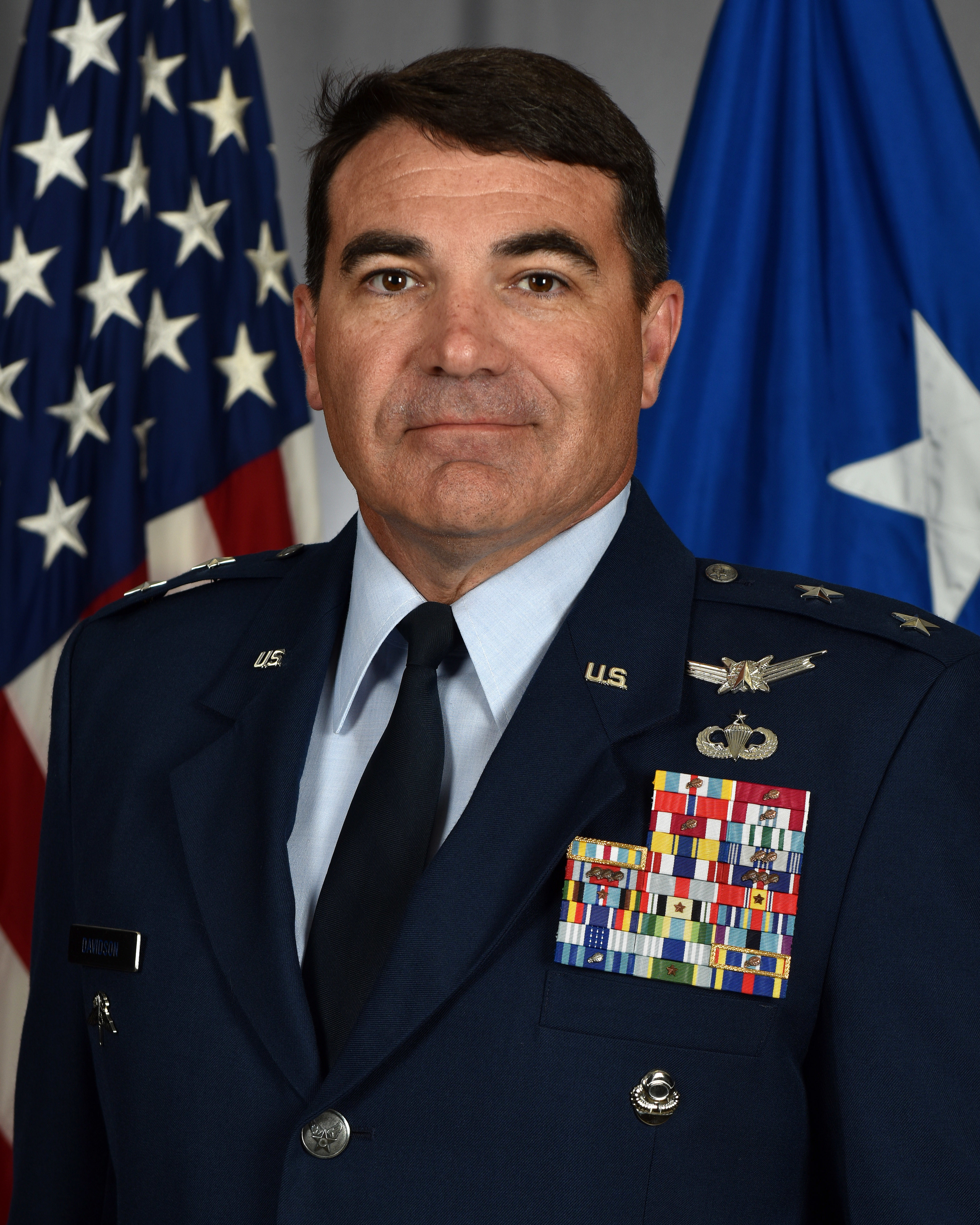
- Military career
- Allegiance: United States
- Branch: United States Air Force
- Service years: 1994–present
- Rank: Major General
- Commands: Second Air Force; 24th Special Operations Wing; 724th Special Tactics Group; 24th Special Tactics Squadron; 320th Special Tactics Squadron
- Awards: Defense Superior Service Medal (2); Legion of Merit (2)

Matthew Wolfe Davidson is a United States Air Force major general who serves as the commander of the Second Air Force. He previously served as the deputy director of the Defense Threat Reduction Agency from 2023 to 2024.

Davidson is a 1993 graduate from Oklahoma State University's Reserve Officer Training Corps program. He is a career Special Tactics Officer and has led special operations forces during operations Provide Comfort II, Assured Response, Joint Endeavor, Enduring Freedom – Philippines, Enduring Freedom and Iraqi Freedom. He commanded at the squadron, group and wing levels and led joint operations as the Chief of Staff for Special Operations Command Central. Prior to assuming his current assignment, Davidson served as the Executive Officer to the Air Force Chief of Staff.

== Education ==
- 1993 Bachelor of Science, Geography, Oklahoma State University, Stillwater
- 1999 Squadron Officer School, Maxwell Air Force Base, Alabama
- 2004 Air Command and Staff College, Maxwell AFB, Ala., by correspondence
- 2004 Master of Science, International Relations, Troy State University, Alabama
- 2005 Army Command and General Staff College, Fort Leavenworth, Kansas
- 2006 Master of Military Art and Science, School of Advanced Military Studies, Fort Leavenworth, Kansas
- 2007 Air War College, Maxwell AFB, Ala., by correspondence
- 2012 Woodrow Wilson International Center for Scholars, Washington, D.C.
- 2014 Joint Forces Staff College, Norfolk Naval Station, Va.

== Military career ==
Davidson served as the deputy commander of the Air Force Special Operations Command. He also served as the director for operations of the Air Force Special Operations Command, as deputy commander of the Special Operations Joint Task Force – Afghanistan, and once served as deputy commander of the Combined Force Space Component Command of the United States Space Command and vice commander of the Space Operations Command, United States Space Force. He was also previously assigned as executive officer to the Chief of Staff of the United States Air Force from June 2016 to April 2018. He was replaced by Michael E. Conley in June 2015.

=== Assignments ===
- January 1994–December 1994, Special Tactics Training Pipeline
- December 1994–August 1997, flight commander, 23rd Special Tactics Squadron, Hurlburt Field, Florida
- August 1997–August 1998, assistant director of Operations, 720th Special Tactics Group, Hurlburt Field, Florida
- August 1998–January 2002, flight commander, 24th Special Tactics Squadron, Pope Air Force Base, North Carolina
- January 2002–May 2003, director of operations, 320th Special Tactics Squadron, Kadena Air Base, Japan
- May 2003–June 2004, commander, 320th Special Tactics Squadron, Kadena AB, Japan
- June 2004–June 2005, U.S. Army Command and General Staff College, Fort Leavenworth, Kansas
- June 2005–June 2006, School of Advanced Military Studies, Fort Leavenworth, Kansas
- June 2006–June 2008, Air and Space Strategist, headquarters Air Force, Project CHECKMATE, the Pentagon, Arlington, Virginia
- June 2008–June 2009, deputy commander, 24th Special Tactics Squadron, Pope AFB, North Carolina
- June 2009–April 2011, commander, 24th Special Tactics Squadron, Pope AFB, North Carolina
- April 2011–June 2012, commander, 724th Special Tactics Group, Pope Army Field, North Carolina
- June 2012–June 2013, Fellow, Woodrow Wilson International Center for Scholars, Washington, D.C.
- June 2013–June 2014, chief of staff, Special Operations Command Central Forward headquarters, Al Udeid Air Base, Qatar
- September 2014–June 2016, commander, 24th Special Operations Wing, Hurlburt Field, Fla.
- June 2016–April 2018, Executive Officer to the Air Force Chief of Staff, the Pentagon, Arlington, Virginia
- April 2018–August 2019, vice commander, 14th Air Force, Vandenberg AFB, Calif.
- August 2019–December 2019, Deputy Combined Force Space Component Commander, U.S. Space Command, and Vice Commander, 14th Air Force, Air Force Space Command, Vandenberg AFB, California
- December 2019–April 2020, Deputy Combined Force Space Component Commander, U.S. Space Command, and Vice Commander, Space Operations Command, U.S. Space Force, Vandenberg AFB, California
- April 2020–August 2022, Director of Operations, Air Force Special Operations Command, Hurlburt Field, Fla.
- August 2022–June 2023, Deputy Commander, AFSOC, Hurlburt Field, Fla.
- July 2023–July 2024, Deputy Director, Defense Threat Reduction Agency, Fort Belvoir, Va.

== Awards and decorations ==
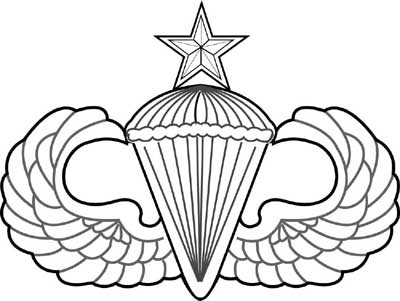
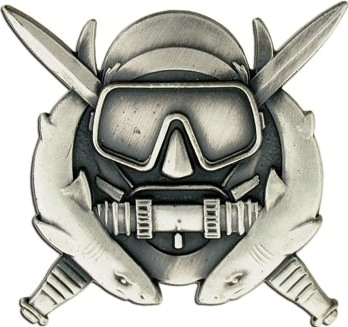
| Senior Parachutist Badge |
| Military Free Fall Parachutist Badge |
| Special Operations Diver Badge |
| Headquarters Air Force Badge |

| Defense Superior Service Medal with one bronze oak leaf cluster |
| Legion of Merit with oak leaf cluster |
| Bronze Star Medal |
| Defense Meritorious Service Medal with oak leaf cluster |
| Meritorious Service Medal with oak leaf cluster |
| Joint Service Commendation Medal |
| Air Force Commendation Medal |
| Air Force Achievement Medal with two oak leaf clusters |
| Joint Meritorious Unit Award |
| Air Force Meritorious Unit Award |
| Air Force Outstanding Unit Award with three oak leaf clusters |
| Combat Readiness Medal with three oak leaf clusters |
| Air Force Recognition Ribbon |
| National Defense Service Medal with one bronze service star |
| Armed Forces Expeditionary Medal with service star |
| Iraq Campaign Medal with service star |
| Global War on Terrorism Expeditionary Medal |
| Global War on Terrorism Service Medal |
| Armed Forces Service Medal |
| Humanitarian Service Medal |
| Air Force Overseas Short Tour Service Ribbon |
| Air Force Overseas Long Tour Service Ribbon |
| Air Force Expeditionary Service Ribbon with gold frame and oak leaf cluster |
| Air Force Longevity Service Award with silver oak leaf cluster |
| Small Arms Expert Marksmanship Ribbon with service star |
| Air Force Training Ribbon |

== Effective dates of promotion ==
| Rank | Date |
|---|---|
| Second lieutenant | Sept. 23, 1993 |
| First lieutenant | Sept. 23 1995 |
| Captain | Sept. 23, 1997 |
| Major | Feb. 1, 2004 |
| Lieutenant colonel | Sept. 1, 2007 |
| Colonel | Sept. 1, 2011 |
| Brigadier general | July 24, 2018 |

Military offices
| Preceded by Robert G. Armfield | Commander of the 24th Special Operations Wing; 2014–2016 | Succeeded by Michael E. Martin |
| Preceded by Heather L. Pringle | Executive Officer to the Chief of Staff of the United States Air Force; 2016–2018 | Succeeded by Larry R. Broadwell |
| Preceded by Chad Franks | Vice Commander of the 14th Air Force, later Space Operations Command; 2018–2020 | Succeeded by Michael E. Conley |
| New office | Deputy Commander of the Combined Force Space Component Command; 2019–2020 | Succeeded by Michael E. Conley |
| Preceded by Michael E. Martin | Deputy Commanding General for Operations of NATO Special Operations Component Command and Special Operations Joint Task Force-Afghanistan; 2020–2021 | Command disestablished |
| Preceded by Michael E. Martin | Director of Operations of the Air Force Special Operations Command; 2021–2022 | Succeeded by Jocelyn J. Schermerhorn |
| Preceded by Eric T. Hill | Deputy Commander of the Air Force Special Operations Command; 2022–2023 | Succeeded by Rebecca J. Sonkiss |
| Preceded by Peter M. Bonetti; Acting | Deputy Director of the Defense Threat Reduction Agency; 2023–2024 | Succeeded by Lyle K. Drew |
| Preceded by Michele C. Edmondson | Commander of the Second Air Force; 2024–present | Incumbent |
