= Leadership of the United States Space Command =

U.S. Space Command leadership

Seal of the United States Space Command

This is a list of all commanders, deputy commanders, senior enlisted leaders, and chiefs of staff of the United States Space Command.

== Current combatant command staff ==
=== Headquarters staff ===
- Stephen Whiting, Commander
  - Vacant, Command Senior Enlisted Leader
  - Richard Zellmann, Deputy Commander
    - Sean Bailey, Chief of Staff
      - David L. Stanfield, Director, Human Capital (J1)
      - Nathan L. Rusin, Director, Intelligence (J2)
      - Anthony Mastalir, Director, Global Space Operations (J3)
        - Eric D. Little, Deputy Director, Operations (J3)
      - Maurice O. Barnett, Director, Plans and Policy (J5)
        - Marcos A. Jasso, Deputy Director, Plans and Policy (J5)
        - Jesse M. Morehouse, Deputy Director, Artificial Intelligence and Security Cooperation (J5)
        - Brig Eddie Maskell-Pedersen (British Army), Deputy Director, Strategy, Plans and Policy (J5)
      - Tse-Horng "Richard" Yu, Director, Command, Control, Communications, Computers, and Cyber (J6)
        - Tracy L. Hines, Deputy Director, Command, Control, Communications, Computers, and Computer Systems (C4) and Information Technology (J6)
      - Samuel C. Keener, Director, Joint Forces Development and Training (J7)
      - U.S. Army CSM Thinh T. Huynh, Commandant
  - Jody Merritt, Mobilization Assistant to the Commander
  - Sean N. Day, Mobilization Assistant to the Deputy Commander
  - Chris Buckley, Inspector General
  - Mark F. Thomas, Chaplain

=== Component commands staff ===
==== Combined Joint Force Space Component Command ====
- Douglas Schiess, Commander
  - Richard Zellmann, Deputy Commander

==== Joint Functional Component Command for Integrated Missile Defense ====
- Sean Gainey, Commander

== List of leaders of the United States Space Command ==
=== Commanders ===
Commander of United States Space Command
- Emblem of the United States Space Command

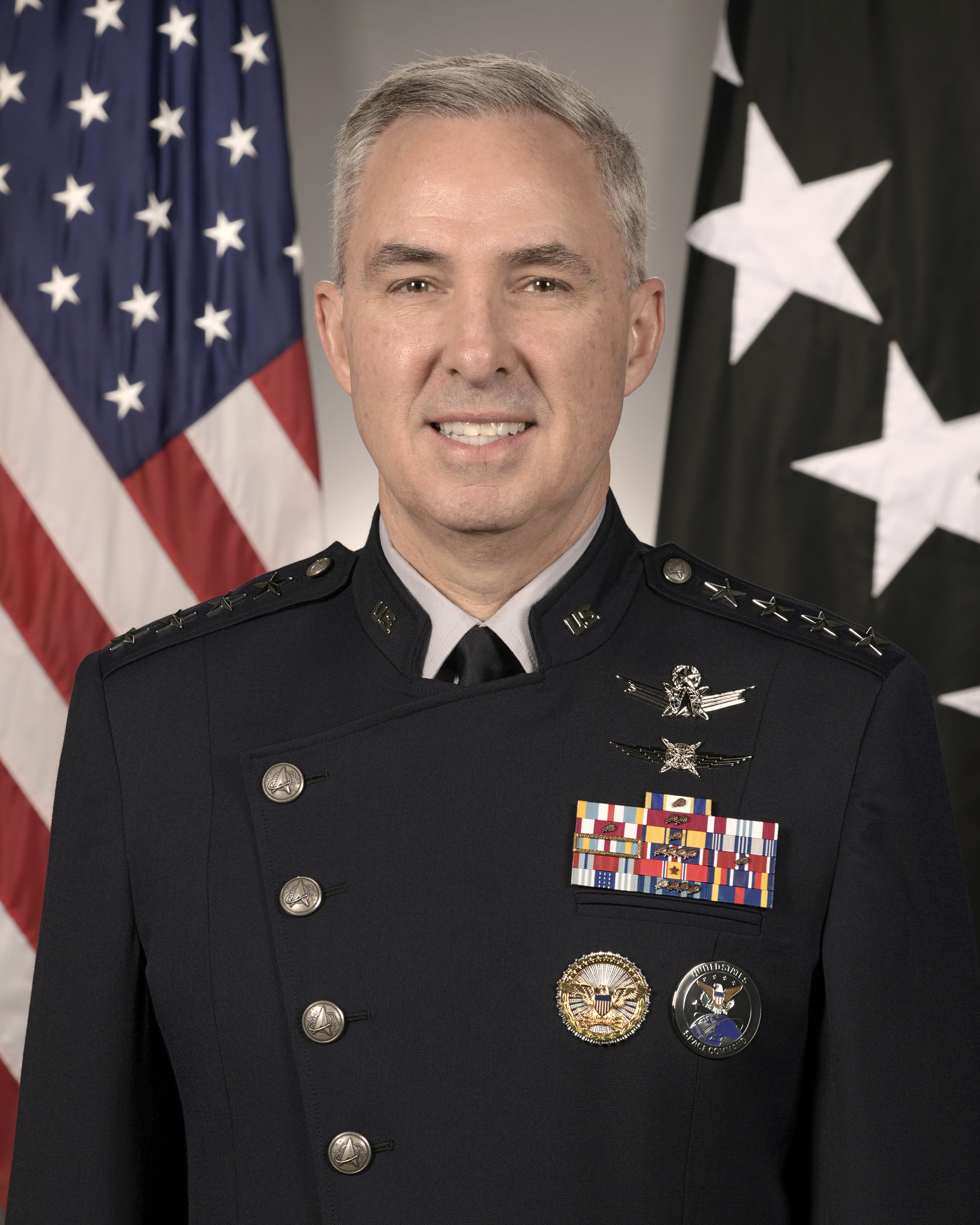
- Incumbent; General Stephen Whiting, USSF since 10 January 2024
- United States Department of Defense
- Type: Unified combatant commander
- Abbreviation: CDRUSSPACECOM
- Reports to: President of the United States; Secretary of Defense
- Seat: Peterson Space Force Base, Colorado Springs, Colorado, U.S.
- Nominator: Secretary of Defense
- Appointer: The president; with Senate advice and consent
- Term length: 2–3 years; (approx.)
- Constituting instrument: 10 U.S.C. § 164
- Precursor: Joint Force Space Component Commander
- Formation: 29 August 2019
- First holder: John W. Raymond
- Deputy: Deputy Commander, United States Space Command

No.	Commander		Term			Service branch
No.	Portrait	Name	Took office	Left office	Term length	Service branch
Commander–in–Chief, United States Space Command
1	Robert T. Herres	General; Robert T. Herres (1932–2008)	23 September 1985	6 February 1987	1 year, 136 days	U.S. Air Force
2	John L. Piotrowski	General; John L. Piotrowski (born 1934)	6 February 1987	1 April 1990	3 years, 84 days	U.S. Air Force
3	Donald J. Kutyna	General; Donald J. Kutyna (born 1933)	1 April 1990	30 June 1992	2 years, 60 days	U.S. Air Force
4	Chuck Horner	General; Chuck Horner (born 1936)	30 June 1992	13 September 1994	2 years, 75 days	U.S. Air Force
5	Joseph W. Ashy	General; Joseph W. Ashy (born 1940)	13 September 1994	26 August 1996	1 year, 348 days	U.S. Air Force
6	Howell M. Estes III	General; Howell M. Estes III (1941–2024)	26 August 1996	14 August 1998	1 year, 353 days	U.S. Air Force
7	Richard B. Myers	General; Richard B. Myers (born 1942)	14 August 1998	22 February 2000	1 year, 192 days	U.S. Air Force
8	Ralph Eberhart	General; Ralph Eberhart (born 1946)	22 February 2000	1 October 2002	2 years, 221 days	U.S. Air Force
Commander, United States Space Command
1	John W. Raymond	General; John W. Raymond (born 1962)	29 August 2019	20 August 2020	357 days	U.S. Space Force
2	James H. Dickinson	General; James H. Dickinson (born 1962/1963)	20 August 2020	10 January 2024	3 years, 143 days	U.S. Army
3	Stephen Whiting	General; Stephen Whiting (born 1967)	10 January 2024	Incumbent	2 years, 273 days	U.S. Space Force

=== Deputy commanders ===
No.	Deputy Commander		Term			Service branch
No.	Portrait	Name	Took office	Left office	Term length	Service branch
Deputy Commander-in-Chief/Chief of Staff, United States Space Command
1	William E. Ramsay	Vice Admiral; William E. Ramsay (1931–2018)	September 1985	March 1989	~3 years, 181 days	U.S. Navy
2	Diego E. Hernandez	Vice Admiral; Diego E. Hernandez (1934–2017)	March 1989	~17 September 1990	~1 year, 200 days	U.S. Navy
3	William A. Dougherty Jr.	Vice Admiral; William A. Dougherty Jr. (born 1947)	December 1990	~20 May 1993	~2 years, 170 days	U.S. Navy
4	David E. Frost	Vice Admiral; David E. Frost	~20 May 1993	August 1996	~3 years, 73 days	U.S. Navy
5	Lyle G. Bien	Vice Admiral; Lyle G. Bien (born 1945)	August 1996	August 1998	~2 years, 0 days	U.S. Navy
6	Herbert A. Browne II	Vice Admiral; Herbert A. Browne II	November 1998	~7 October 2000	~1 year, 341 days	U.S. Navy
7	Edward G. Anderson III	Lieutenant General; Edward G. Anderson III	~7 October 2000	January 2002	~1 year, 86 days	U.S. Army
Deputy Commander, United States Space Command
1	James H. Dickinson	Lieutenant General; James H. Dickinson (born 1962/1963)	28 September 2019	20 August 2020	327 days	U.S. Army
–	Tim C. Lawson	Major General; Tim C. Lawson; Acting	20 August 2020	24 November 2020	96 days	U.S. Army
2	John E. Shaw	Lieutenant General; John E. Shaw (born 1968)	24 November 2020	5 October 2023	2 years, 315 days	U.S. Space Force
–	Will Pennington	Rear Admiral; Will Pennington; Acting	5 October 2023	5 December 2023	61 days	U.S. Navy
3	Thomas L. James	Lieutenant General; Thomas L. James (born c. 1968)	5 December 2023	3 November 2025	1 year, 333 days	U.S. Army
4	Richard Zellman	Lieutenant General; Richard Zellman (born c. 1970)	3 November 2025	Incumbent	341 days	U.S. Army

=== Senior enlisted leaders ===
No.	Senior enlisted leader		Term			Service branch
No.	Portrait	Name	Took office	Left office	Term length	Service branch
1	Roger A. Towberman	Chief Master Sergeant; Roger A. Towberman (born 1966/1967)	29 August 2019	28 August 2020	365 days	U.S. Space Force
2	Scott H. Stalker	Master Gunnery Sergeant; Scott H. Stalker (born 1975)	28 August 2020	7 August 2023	2 years, 344 days	U.S. Marine Corps
3	Jacob C. Simmons	Chief Master Sergeant; Jacob C. Simmons (born c. 1974)	7 August 2023	1 September 2026	3 years, 25 days	U.S. Space Force

=== Chiefs of staff ===
No.	Chief of Staff		Term			Service branch
No.	Portrait	Name	Took office	Left office	Term length	Service branch
1	Brook J. Leonard	Major General; Brook J. Leonard (born 1970)	29 August 2019	24 August 2022	2 years, 360 days	U.S. Air Force
2	Will Pennington	Rear Admiral; Will Pennington (born 1967)	24 August 2022	5 August 2025	2 years, 346 days	U.S. Navy
3	Sean Bailey	Rear Admiral; Sean Bailey (born 1969)	5 August 2025	Incumbent	1 year, 66 days	U.S. Navy

== See also ==
- United States Space Command
- Leadership of the United States Africa Command
- Leadership of the United States European Command
- Leadership of the United States Indo-Pacific Command
- Leadership of the United States Northern Command
- Leadership of the United States Cyber Command
- Leadership of the United States Strategic Command
- Leadership of the United States Transportation Command
