= Brook J. Leonard =

U.S. Air Force general

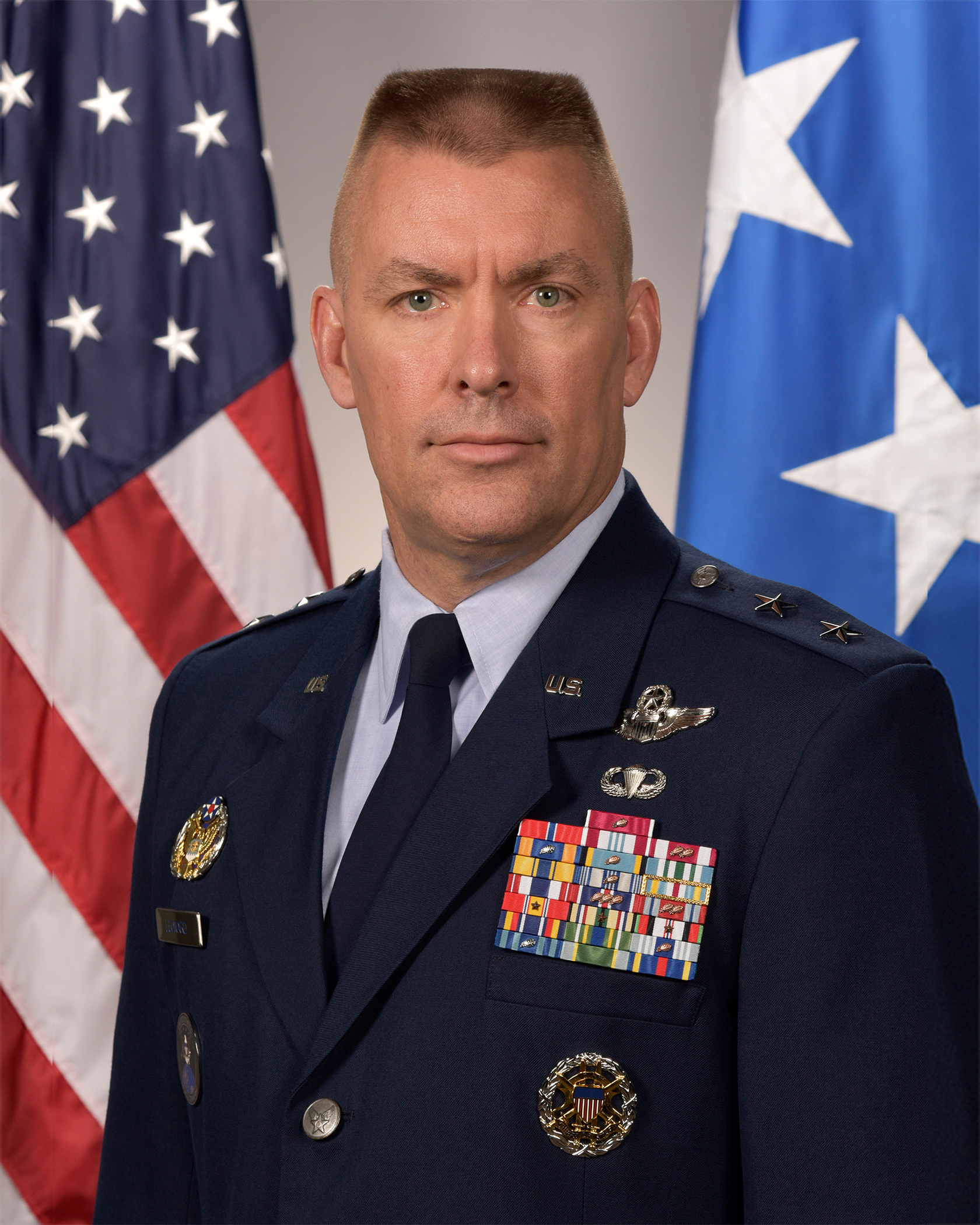
- Official portrait, 2021
- Born: c. 1970 (age 55–56); Annandale, Virginia, U.S.
- Military career
- Allegiance: United States
- Branch: United States Air Force
- Service years: 1992–2023
- Rank: Major General
- Commands: 321st Air Expeditionary Wing; 56th Fighter Wing; 51st Fighter Wing; 451st Expeditionary Operations Group; 16th Weapons Squadron
- Conflicts: War in Afghanistan
- Awards: Legion of Merit (2); Bronze Star Medal

Brook Jason Leonard (born c. 1970) is a retired United States Air Force major general who last served as the deputy commander and director of operations of Combined Joint Task Force–Space Operations. He previously served as the chief of staff of the United States Space Command. A fighter pilot, he has commanded the 321st Air Expeditionary Wing, 56th Fighter Wing, and 51st Fighter Wing.

Leonard entered the Air Force in May 1992 as a graduate of the United States Air Force Academy. In his current position, Leonard is the principal advisor to the commander and vice commander of the United States Space Force and directs the activities of the command staff in order to deter aggression and develop combat-ready forces prepared to fight for and preserve United States and allied space superiority. He also chairs numerous boards, oversees the command's corporate process, and serves as the director of the commander's staff.

== Education ==
- 1992 Bachelor of Science degree in aeronautical engineering, U.S. Air Force Academy, Colorado Springs, Colo.
- 1998 USAF Weapons School, F-16 Weapons Instructor Course, Nellis AFB, Nev.
- 1999 Squadron Officer School, Maxwell AFB, Ala.
- 2005 Master of Military Operational Art and Science degree, Air Command and Staff College, Maxwell AFB, Ala.
- 2006 Master of Airpower Art and Science degree, School of Advanced Air and Space Studies, Maxwell AFB, Ala.
- 2010 Master of Strategic Studies degree, U.S. Army War College, Carlisle Barracks, Pa.
- 2016 Enterprise Leadership Seminar, Kenan-Flagler Business School, University of North Carolina, Chapel Hill
- 2017 Joint Force Air Component Commander Course, Maxwell AFB, Ala.
- 2017 Joint Flag Officer Warfighting Course, Maxwell AFB, Ala.

== Assignments ==
1. May 1992 – December 1993, Student, Euro-NATO Joint Jet Pilot Training, Sheppard AFB, Texas
2. January 1994 – February 1995, Student, F-16 Initial Qualification Course, Luke AFB, Ariz.
3. February 1995 – July 1996, Assistant Weapons Officer, 74th Fighter Squadron, Pope AFB, N.C.
4. July 1996 – July 1998, Flight Commander, 36th Fighter Squadron, Osan AB, South Korea
5. July 1998 – December 1998, Student, USAF Weapons School Instructor Course, Nellis AFB, Nev.
6. January 1999 – July 1999, Chief of Weapons, 36th Fighter Squadron, Osan AB, South Korea
7. August 1999 – January 2002, Wing Weapons Officer, 35th Fighter Wing, Misawa AB, Japan
8. January 2002 – July 2004, Assistant Director of Operations and F-16 Weapons Instructor Pilot, USAF Weapons School, F-16 Division, Nellis AFB, Nev.
9. July 2004 – July 2005, Student, Air Command and Staff College, Maxwell AFB, Ala.
10. July 2005 – July 2006, Student, School of Advanced Air and Space Studies, Maxwell AFB, Ala.
11. September 2006 – June 2007, Director of Operations, 18th Fighter Squadron, Eielson AFB, Alaska
12. June 2007 – June 2009, Commander, 16th Weapons Squadron, Nellis AFB, Nev.
13. June 2009 – June 2010, Student, U.S. Army War College, Carlisle Barracks, Pa.
14. June 2010 – July 2012, Division Chief, Iran and Levant Division, Joint Staff (J5), Deputy Directorate Political-Military Affairs Middle East, the Pentagon, Arlington, Va.
15. July 2012 – July 2013, Commander, 451st Expeditionary Operations Group, Kandahar, Afghanistan
16. July 2013 – June 2015, Commander, 51st Fighter Wing, Osan AB, South Korea
17. June 2015 – July 2016, Senior Military Assistant to the Secretary of the Air Force, Arlington, Va.
18. July 2016 – June 2018, Commander, 56th Fighter Wing, Luke AFB, Ariz.
19. July 2018 – July 2019, Director of Air Operations, Combined Joint Task Force – Operation INHERENT RESOLVE; Commander, 321st Air Expeditionary Wing; Commander, Task Force - Air; and Deputy Commander 9th Air Expeditionary Task Force – Levant, Union III, Baghdad, Iraq
20. July 2019 – August 2019, Chief of Staff, Joint Force Space Component Command, Peterson AFB, Colo.
21. August 2019 – August 2022, Chief of Staff, United States Space Command, Peterson AFB, Colo.
22. September 2022 – November 2022, Special Assistant to the Commander, United States Space Command, Peterson AFB, Colo.
23. November 2022 – August 2023, Director of Operations, Combined Joint Task Force–Space Operations, Peterson AFB, Colo.
24. December – August 2023, Deputy Commander, Combined Joint Task Force–Space Operations, Peterson AFB, Colo.

== Awards and decorations ==
US Air Force Command Pilot Badge
Basic Parachutist Badge
Joint Chiefs of Staff Identification Badge
United States Space Command Badge
Headquarters Air Force Badge

Legion of Merit with one bronze oak leaf cluster
Bronze Star Medal
Defense Meritorious Service Medal
Meritorious Service Medal with two oak leaf clusters
Air Medal with silver oak leaf cluster
Aerial Achievement Medal with oak leaf cluster
Joint Service Commendation Medal
Air Force Commendation Medal
Air Force Achievement Medal with oak leaf cluster
Joint Meritorious Unit Award
Air Force Meritorious Unit Award
Air Force Outstanding Unit Award with two oak leaf clusters
Combat Readiness Medal with two oak leaf clusters
National Defense Service Medal with one bronze service star
Southwest Asia Service Medal with service star
Afghanistan Campaign Medal with service star
Global War on Terrorism Service Medal
Korea Defense Service Medal
Air Force Overseas Long Tour Service Ribbon with oak leaf cluster
Air Force Longevity Service Award with one silver and one bronze oak leaf clusters
Small Arms Expert Marksmanship Ribbon
Air Force Training Ribbon

== Effective dates of promotion ==
Rank	Date
Second lieutenant	27 May 1992
First lieutenant	2 May 1994
Captain	27 May 1996
Major	1 November 2002
Lieutenant colonel	1 December 2006
Colonel	1 September 2011
Brigadier general	5 May 2017
Major general	7 May 2021

Military offices
Preceded by Patrick McKenzie	Commander of the 51st Fighter Wing; 2013–2015	Succeeded by Andrew P. Hansen
Preceded by Wayne Monteith	Senior Military Assistant to the United States Secretary of the Air Force; 2015–2016	Succeeded by Kristin E. Goodwin
Preceded by Scott L. Pleus	Commander of the 56th Fighter Wing; 2016–2018	Succeeded by Todd Canterbury
Preceded by ???	Director of Air Operations of the Combined Joint Task Force – Operation Inherent Resolve and Commander of the 321st Air Expeditionary Wing; 2018–2019	Succeeded by Richard Boutwell
Preceded by Kristin E. Goodwin	Chief of Staff of the Joint Force Space Component Command, later United States Space Command; 2019–2022	Succeeded by Will Pennington
New title	Director of Operations of Combined Joint Task Force–Space Operations; 2022–2023	Succeeded by Samuel C. Keener
Preceded by Thomas L. James	Deputy Commander of Combined Joint Task Force–Space Operations; 2022–2023	Succeeded by Richard Zellmann
