= Robert Claude =

U.S. Air Force general

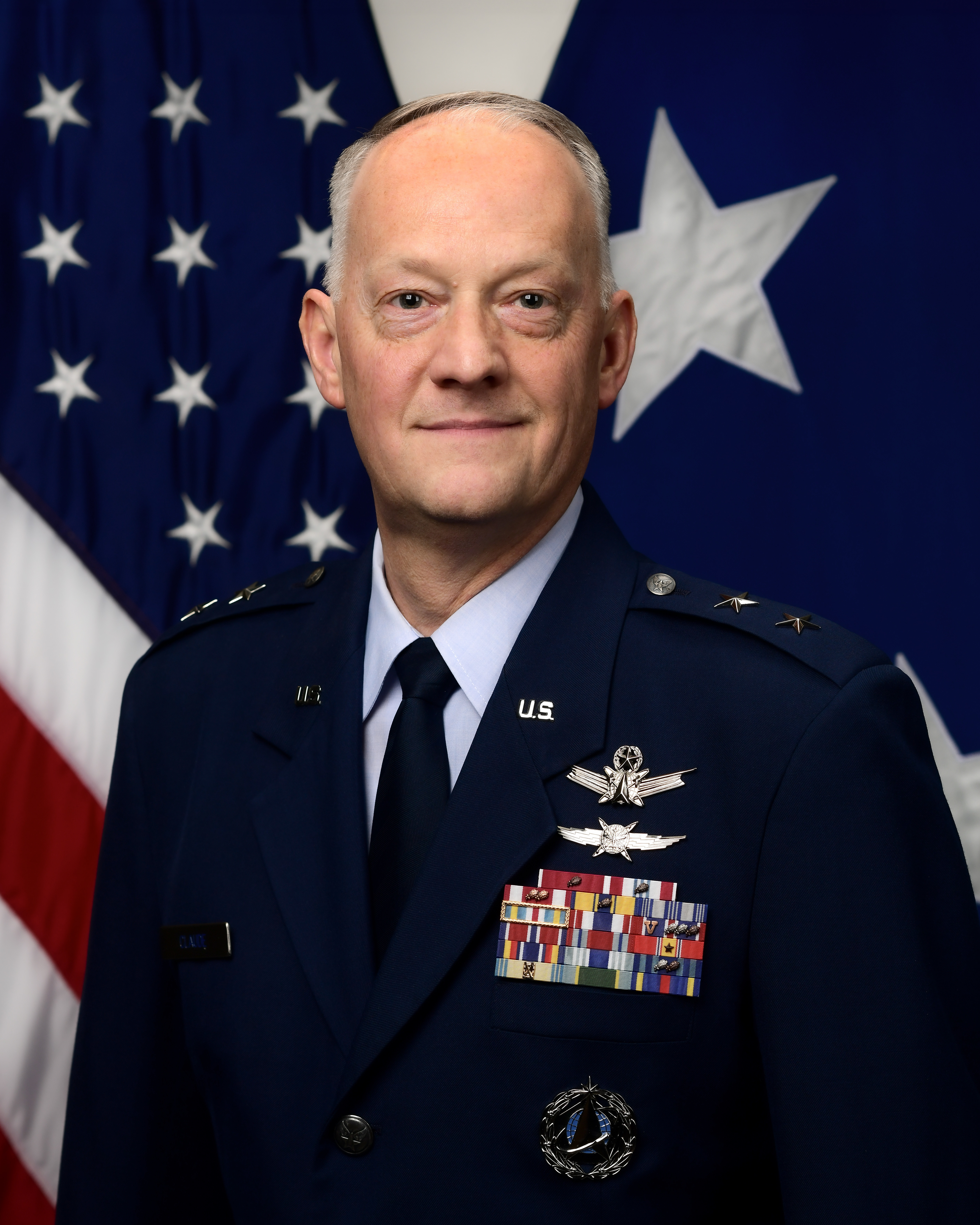
- Official portrait, 2024
- Military career
- Allegiance: United States
- Branch: United States Air Force
- Service years: 1991–present
- Rank: Major general
- Commands: 380th Space Control Squadron
- Awards: Legion of Merit (2)

Robert W. Claude is a United States Air Force major general who served as the mobilization assistant to the chief of space operations. He previously served as the mobilization assistant to the commander of the United States Space Command.

== Military career ==
In January 2024, Claude was nominated for promotion to major general.

Military offices
Preceded by Pamela J. Lincoln	Vice Commander of the 310th Space Wing; 2014–2016	Succeeded by Darren Buck
New title	Mobilization Assistant to the Deputy Chief of Space Operations for Strategy, Plans, Programs, Requirements, and Analysis of the United States Space Force; 2021	Succeeded by Damon S. Feltman
Preceded by Damon S. Feltman	Mobilization Assistant to the Director of Operations, Training, and Force Development of the United States Space Command; 2021–2022	Succeeded by Stephen E. Slade
Preceded by Tim C. Lawson	Mobilization Assistant to the Commander of the United States Space Command; 2022–2024	Succeeded by Jody Merritt
Preceded by John M. Olson	Mobilization Assistant to the Chief of Space Operations; 2024–present	Incumbent
