= General Lincoln =

General Lincoln may refer to:

- Benjamin Lincoln (1733–1810), Continental Army major general
- Lawrence Joseph Lincoln, (1909-2000), U.S. Army lieutenant general
- Pamela J. Lincoln (fl. 1980s–2020s), U.S. Air Force major general
- Rush B. Lincoln Jr. (1910–2002), U.S. Army major general
