= General Merritt =

General Merritt may refer to:

- Edwin Atkins Merritt (1828–1916), New York Militia brigadier general
- Jack N. Merritt (1930–2018), U.S. Army four-star general
- Jody Merritt (fl. 1980s–2020s), U.S. Air Force brigadier general
- Lewie G. Merritt (1897–1974), U.S. Marine Corps major general
- Wesley Merritt (1836–1910), U.S. Army major general
