= Patrick Cobb =

U.S. Air Force general

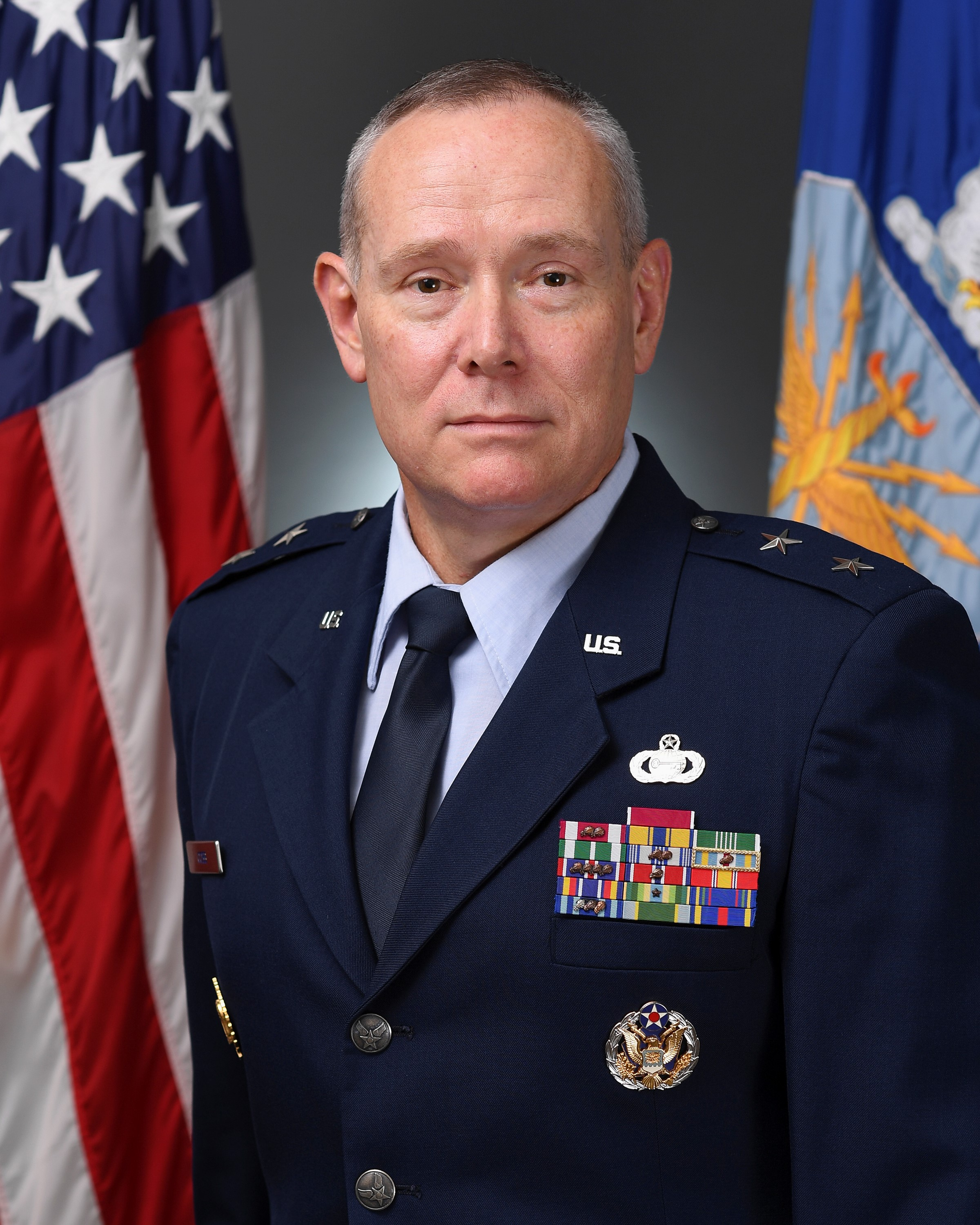
- Official portrait, 2021
- Military career
- Allegiance: United States
- Branch: United States Air Force
- Service years: 1991–present
- Rank: Major general
- Commands: 102nd Intelligence Wing
- Awards: Legion of Merit

Patrick J. Cobb is a retired United States Air Force major general who has served as the Air National Guard Assistant to the Commander of the Space Operations Command since July 2021. Previously, he was the Special Assistant for Space to the Chief of the National Guard Bureau from April to July 2021. He was nominated for promotion to major general on November 18, 2020.

Military offices
New office	Deputy Director of Space Operations of the National Guard Bureau; 2019–2021	Succeeded by Samuel C. Keener
Preceded by Shawn Bratton	Special Assistant for Space to the Chief of the National Guard Bureau; 2021	Succeeded by ???
Preceded by Ryan Okahara	Air National Guard Assistant to the Commander of the Space Operations Command; 2021–present	Incumbent
