= Traci Kueker-Murphy =

U.S. Air Force general

Traci L. Kueker-Murphy
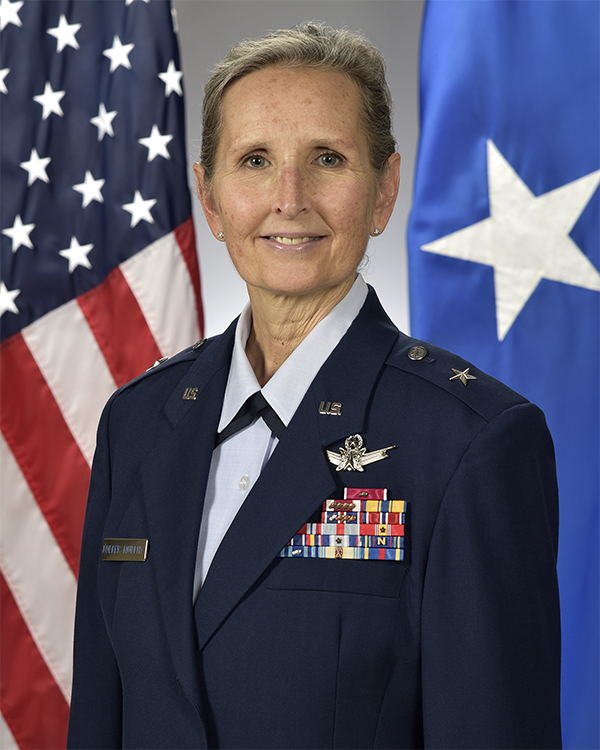
- Military career
- Allegiance: United States
- Branch: United States Air Force
- Service years: 1990–2024
- Rank: Brigadier General
- Commands: 310th Space Wing; 310th Operations Group; 19th Space Operations Squadron
- Awards: Legion of Merit (2)

Traci L. Kueker-Murphy is a United States Air Force brigadier general serving as the deputy director of strategy, plans, and policy of the United States Space Command. She previously served as the mobilization assistant to the deputy chief of space operations for operations, cyber, and nuclear of the United States Space Force. She has also served as the commander of the 310th Space Wing.

Military offices
Preceded by Damon S. Feltman	Commander of the 310th Space Wing; 2016–2018	Succeeded by Dean D. Sniegowski
Preceded by Catherine Kleman	Mobilization Assistant to the Director of Space and Cyber Operations of the Air Force Space Command, later Space Operations Command; 2018–2021	Succeeded by ???
Preceded by DeAnna Burt	Director of Space and Cyber Operations of the Space Operations Command; Acting; 2020	Succeeded by Douglas Schiess
New title	Mobilization Assistant to the Deputy Chief of Space Operations for Operations, Cyber, and Nuclear of the United States Space Force; 2021–2022	Succeeded by Nathan D. Yates
Preceded by Devin Pepper	Deputy Director of Strategy, Plans, and Policy of the United States Space Command; 2022–present	Incumbent
