= David F. Stewart =

U.S. Army general

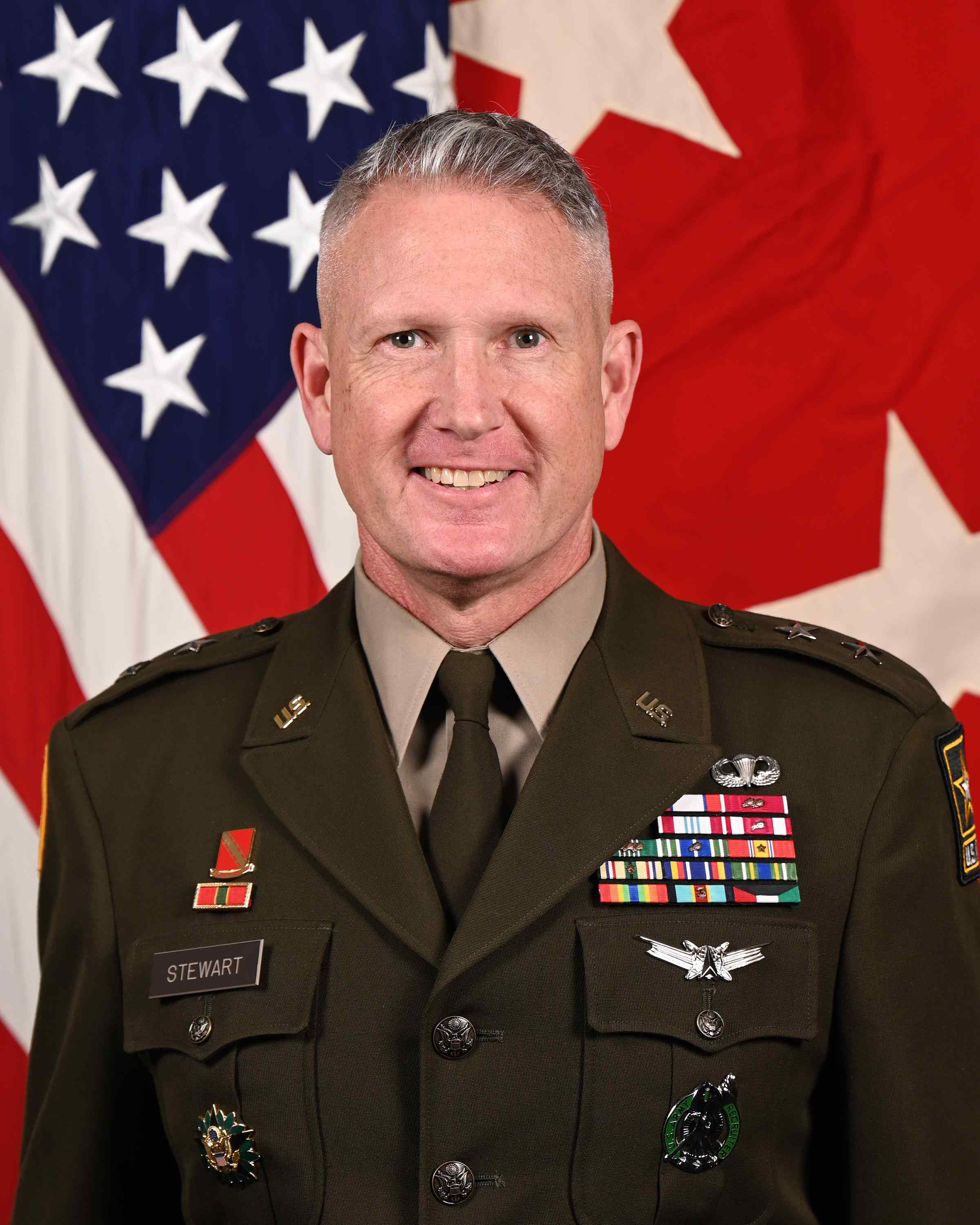
- Official portrait, 2024
- Military career
- Allegiance: United States
- Branch: United States Army
- Service years: 1991–present
- Rank: Major General
- Commands: 32nd Army Air and Missile Defense Command; 2nd Recruiting Brigade; U.S Army Mission Support Battalion

David F. Stewart is a United States Army major general who serves as director of the Counter-Unmanned Aircraft Systems Office and director of fires of the Army. He previously served as the commanding general of the 32nd Army Air and Missile Defense Command from 2021 to 2023.

In September 2023, Stewart was nominated for promotion to major general.

Military offices
Preceded by Tim C. Lawson	Deputy Commander for Operations of the United States Army Space and Missile Defense Command; 2019–2020	Succeeded by Eric D. Little
Preceded by Clement S. Coward Jr.	Commanding General of the 32nd Army Air and Missile Defense Command; 2020–2023	Succeeded by Richard A. Harrison
Preceded by Sean Gainey	Director of the Counter-Unmanned Aircraft Systems Office and Director of Fires of the United States Army; 2024–present	Incumbent
