= Ryan Okahara =

U.S. Air Force general

Ryan T. Okahara
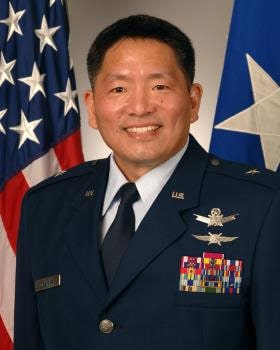
- Military career
- Allegiance: United States
- Branch: United States Air Force
- Service years: 1990–present
- Rank: Brigadier General
- Awards: Legion of Merit

Ryan T. Okahara is a United States Air Force brigadier general serving as the Air National Guard assistant to the commander of the United States Space Command. Previously, he served as Air National Guard assistant to the commander of the Space Operations Command. He has also served as commander of the Hawaii Air National Guard.

In October 2020, he was nominated for promotion to major general but the nomination was returned by the United States Senate. He was again nominated for promotion in June 2021.

Military offices
Preceded by Edward A. Sauley III	Air National Guard Assistant to the Commander of the Air Force Space Command; 2020–2021	Succeeded by Patrick Cobb
Preceded by Pamela J. Lincoln	Mobilization Assistant to the Commander of the United States Space Command; 2021–present	Incumbent
