= 94th Army Air and Missile Defense Command =

94th Army Air and Missile Defense Command (94th AAMDC)
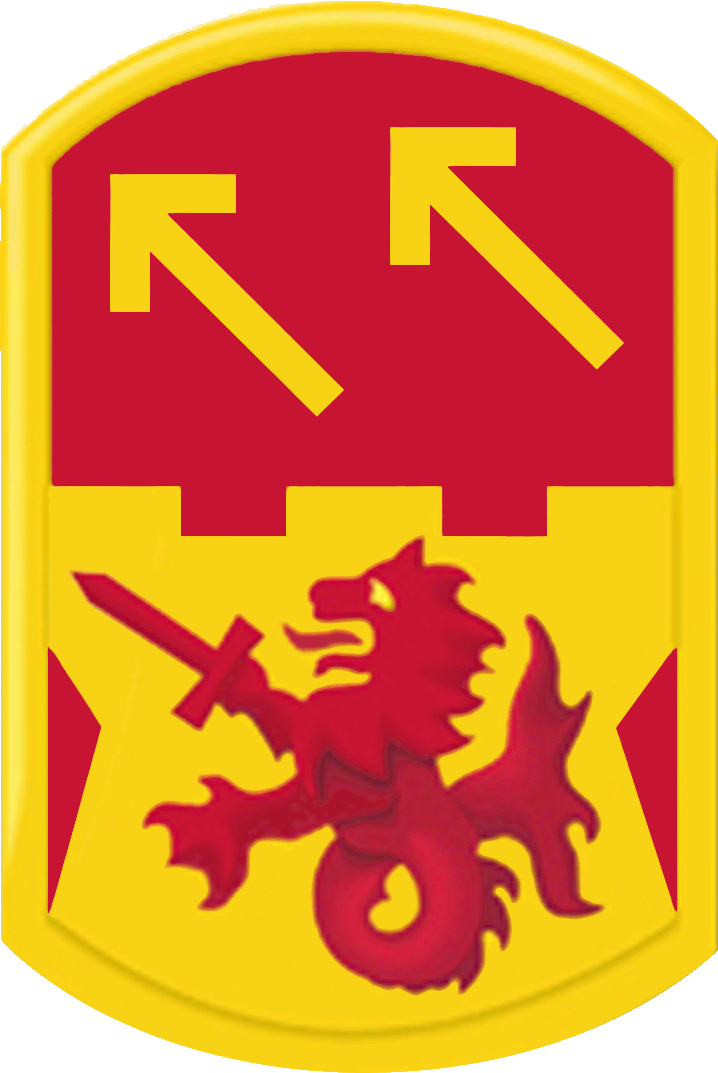
- 94th Air Defense Artillery Command Shoulder Sleeve Insignia
- Active: 1940 – Present
- Country: United States
- Branch: United States Army
- Type: Air Defense Artillery
- Role: Army's operational lead for Theater Air and Missile Defense
- Part of: United States Army Pacific
- Garrison/HQ: Joint Base Pearl Harbor–Hickam, Hawaii, U.S.
- Motto: "First Line of Defense"
- Colors: Yellow and Scarlet
- Decorations: Philippine Republic Presidential Unit Citation 1944-1945, Superior Unit Award

Commanders
- Commanding General: MG Brian W. Gibson
- Command Sergeant Major: Command Sergeant Major Quinnus Caldwell

Insignia
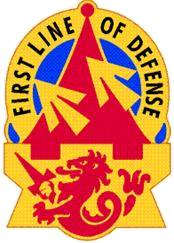
- Distinctive Unit Insignia

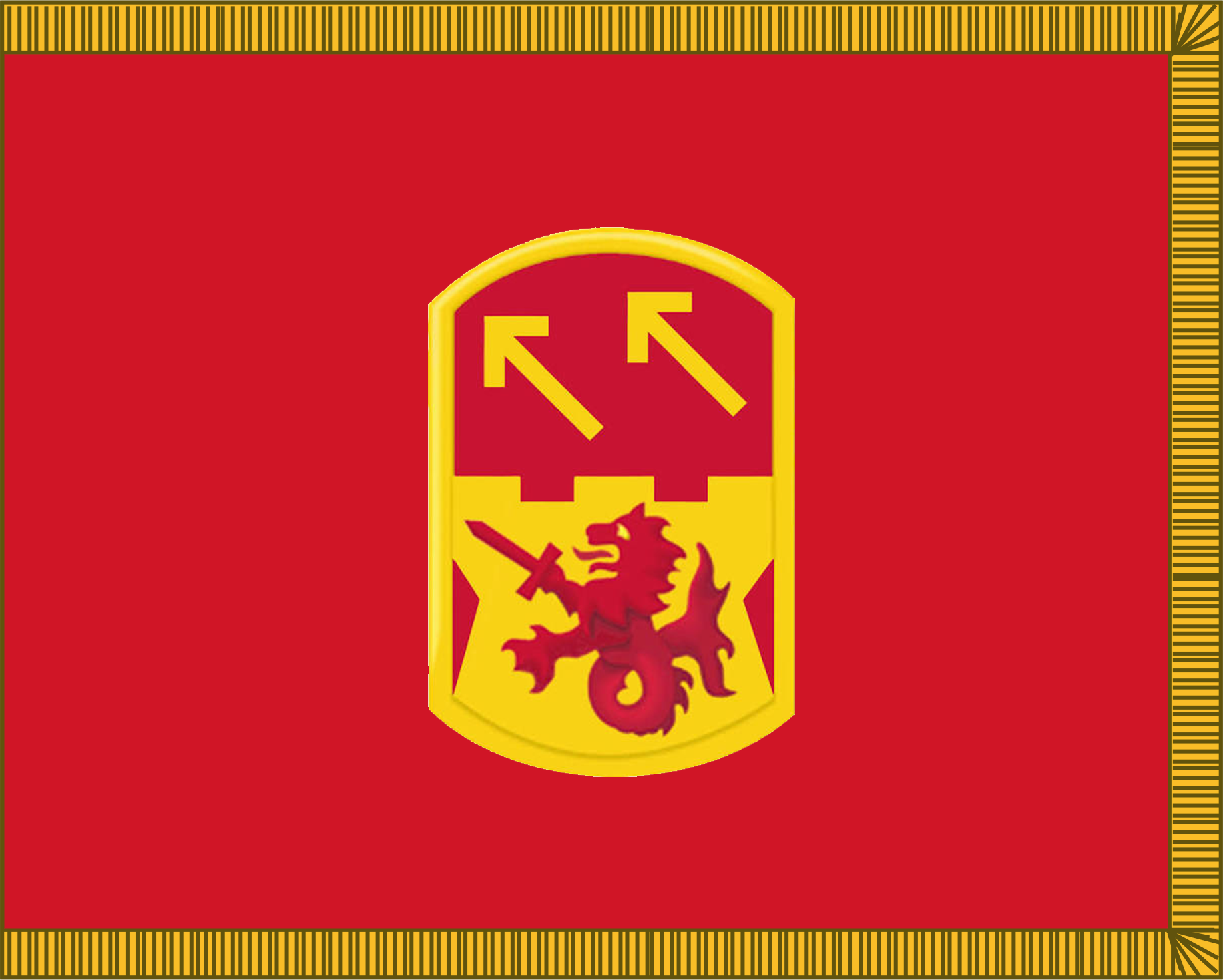
- 94th Air and Missile Defense Command Flag

The 94th Army Air and Missile Defense Command (94th AAMDC) is an activated (at Fort Shafter on 16 October 2005) Air Defense Artillery command of the United States Army assigned to United States Army Pacific. It is headquartered at Joint Base Pearl Harbor–Hickam, Hawai'i at the Pacific Air Force Headquarters.

== Organization ==
As of 2025 the 94th AAMDC consists of the following units:

- 94th Army Air And Missile Defence Command
  - 94th AAMDC Headquarters and Headquarters Battery, at Joint Base Pearl Harbor–Hickam (Hawaii)
    - Headquarters and Headquarters Battery
    - 35th Air Defense Artillery Brigade, at Osan Air Base (South Korea)
      - Headquarters and Headquarters Battery
      - 2nd Battalion, 1st Air Defense Artillery Regiment, at Camp Carroll (MIM-104 Patriot)
      - 6th Battalion, 52nd Air Defense Artillery Regiment, at Suwon Air Base (MIM-104 Patriot, AN/TWQ-1 Avenger)
      - Combined Task Force-Defender (CTF-D), at Camp Carroll
        - Battery D, 2nd Air Defense Artillery Regiment, at Camp Carroll (THAAD)
    - 38th Air Defense Artillery Brigade, at Sagami General Depot (Japan)
      - Headquarters and Headquarters Battery
      - 1st Battalion, 1st Air Defense Artillery Regiment, at Kadena Air Base (MIM-104 Patriot)
      - 10th Missile Defence Battery, in Shariki (AN/TPY-2 THAAD radar site)
      - 14th Missile Defence Battery, in Kyogamisaki (AN/TPY-2 THAAD radar site)
      - Task Force Talon, at Andersen Air Force Base in Guam
        - Battery E, 3rd Air Defense Artillery Regiment, at Andersen Air Force Base in Guam

== History ==
The 94th Air Defense Artillery was constituted on 16 December 1940 in the Regular Army as the 94th Coast Artillery. On 17 April 1941 it was activated at Camp Davis, North Carolina. The Regiment was later broken up on 15 May 1943 and its elements reorganized and re-designated as Headquarters and Headquarters Battery, 94th Antiaircraft Artillery Group. During the Second World War, the 94th Coast Artillery participated in major war campaigns within the East Indies, New Guinea, Leyte, and Luzon during which it received commemorate streamers and was additionally decorated with the Philippine Presidential Unit Citation streamer.

After World War II, the Headquarters and Headquarters Battery, 94th Antiaircraft Artillery Group, was inactivated on 15 March 1947 in the Philippines. On 1 April 1960, it was re designated in Kaiserslautern, Germany as Headquarters and Headquarters Battery, 94th Artillery Group, as part of the 32nd Army Air Defense Command. The 94th Air Defense Artillery Group was re-designated on 15 March 1972 as Headquarters and Headquarters Battery, 94th Air Defense Artillery Group. The 94th Air Defense Artillery Group was later re-designated on 16 July 1983 as Headquarters and Headquarters Battery, 94th Air Defense Artillery Brigade.

Missile defense was important during the Cold War period, the 94th Artillery Group defended NATO with Nike Hercules, HAWK, PATRIOT, Chaparral and Vulcan Air Defense Systems inspiring the motto of "First Line of Defense". After the collapse of communism in Europe, the 94th Air Defense Artillery Brigade continued to support European Command contingencies throughout the European Command Area of Operations.

During deployment from September 1991 to February 1992, Headquarters and Headquarters Battery, 94th Air Defense Artillery Brigade earned the Army Superior Unit Award for its direct support of United States led multinational operation "Determined Resolve" in the Persian Gulf. Before its inactivation in 1998, the 94th Air Defense Artillery Brigade formed the nucleus for the first ever Joint Theater Missile Defense Task Force that deployed to Israel in support of Operation Noble Safeguard and Desert Thunder.

On 16 July 2021 soldiers from 94th AAMDC conducted the first-ever MIM-104 Patriot live fire exercise in Australia during the Talisman Saber 21 exercise at the Shoalwater Bay Training Area in Queensland, Australia.

On 7 October 2021 94th AAMDC announced it was deploying one of the Army's two Iron Dome Defense System - Army (IDDS-A) batteries to Andersen Air Force Base in Guam for experimental testing. The deployment was focused on gathering data on deployability, sustainment, and how Iron Dome integrates with current Army air defense architecture.

In March 2022 the command deployed a THAAD remote launch package to the CNMI island of Rota - the first operational use of THAAD's new remote launch capability.

On 15 June 2022 the command conducted the first Patriot live-fire in Palau as well as the first Patriot live-fire to integrate F-35 radar data outside of a testing environment. The live-fire was a part of the Valiant Shield 22 exercise.

== List of commanders ==
- BG John Seward 2005
- BG Roger Mathews 2007
- BG Jeffery Underhill
- BG James H. Dickinson, August 2011
- BG Daniel L. Karbler, July 2012
- BG Eric L. Sanchez, June 2014
- BG Sean Gainey, 5 August 2016
- BG Michael T. Morrissey, 26 July 2018
- BG Mark A. Holler, 11 February 2020
- MG Brian W. Gibson, 30 June 2022
