= Richard Boutwell =

U.S. Air Force general

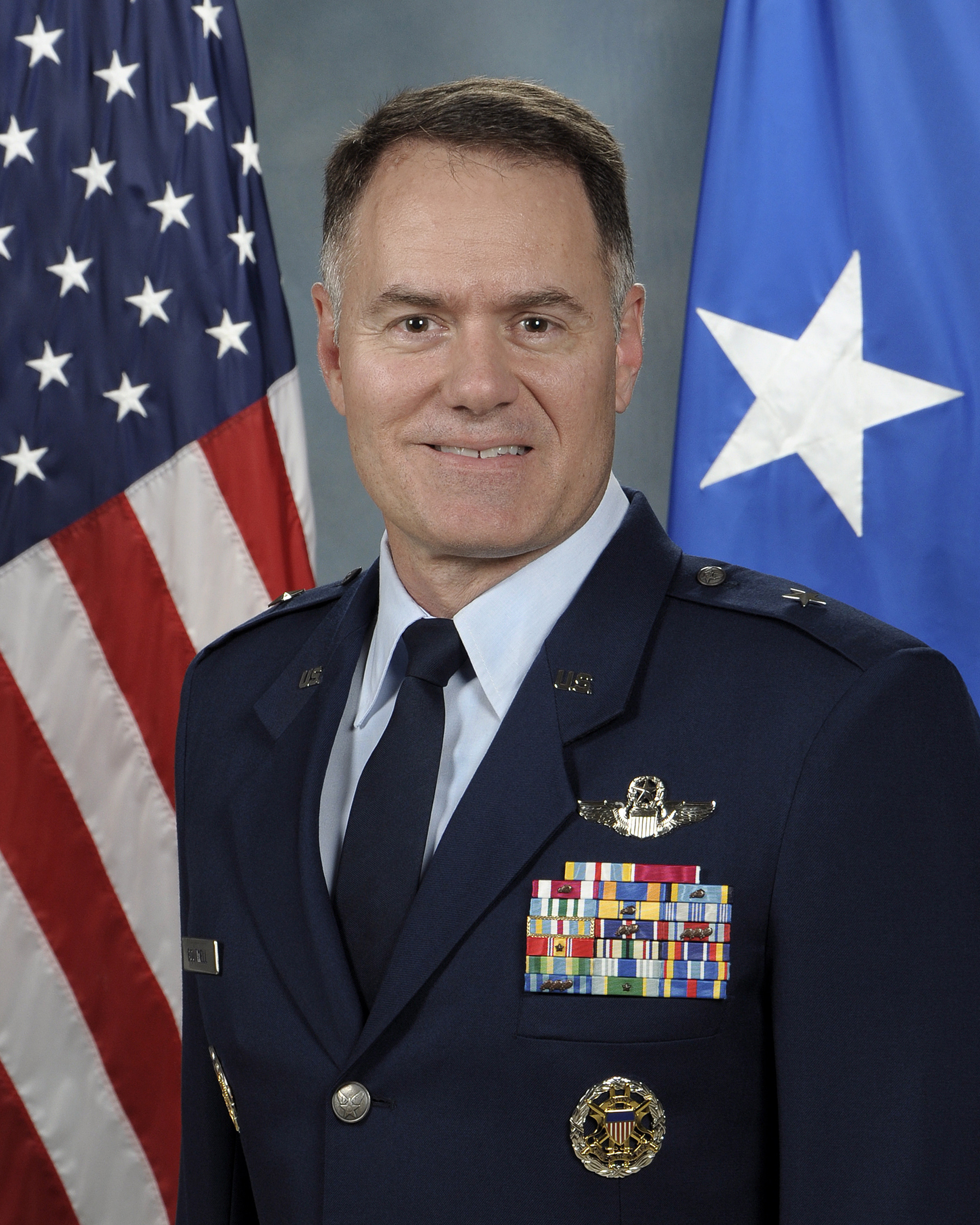
- Official portrait, 2017
- Military career
- Allegiance: United States
- Branch: United States Air Force
- Service years: 1991–present
- Rank: Brigadier general
- Commands: 321st Air Expeditionary Wing; 99th Air Base Wing; 1st Operations Group; 44th Fighter Squadron
- Awards: Defense Superior Service Medal; Legion of Merit (2)

Richard H. Boutwell is a United States Air Force brigadier general who had served as the vice commander of the Fifteenth Air Force. He previously commanded the 321st Air Expeditionary Wing.

Military offices
| Preceded by Barry Cornish | Commander of the 99th Air Base Wing; 2014–2016 | Succeeded by Paul J. Murray |
| Preceded by ??? | Executive Officer to the Commander of the North American Aerospace Defense Command and United States Northern Command; 2016–2017 | Succeeded by Adrian Spain |
| Preceded by Billy D. Thompson | Director for Regional Affairs of the Office of the Deputy Under Secretary of the Air Force for International Affairs; 2018 | Succeeded by Matthew C. Isler |
| Preceded by Brook J. Leonard | Commander of the 321st Air Expeditionary Wing; 2019–2020 | Succeeded by William D. Betts |
| Preceded by ??? | Vice Commander of the Fifteenth Air Force; 2020–present | Vacant |
