= Michael T. Morrissey =

U.S. Army general

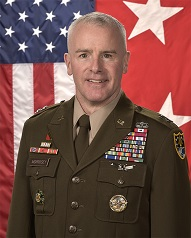
- Official portrait, 2021
- Born: c. 1962 (age 63–64); Milford, Delaware, U.S.
- Military career
- Allegiance: United States
- Branch: United States Army
- Service years: 1989–present
- Rank: Major General
- Commands: 94th Army Air and Missile Defense Command; 31st Air Defense Artillery Brigade; 5th Battalion, 5th Air Defense Artillery Regiment
- Conflicts: Gulf War; Iraq War; Syria
- Awards: Army Distinguished Service Medal (2); Defense Superior Service Medal; Legion of Merit; Bronze Star Medal (3)

Michael T. Morrissey (c. 1962) is a United States Army major general who last served as the director of plans and policy of the United States Space Command. A career air defense artillery officer, he previously commanded the 94th Army Air and Missile Defense Command.

== Early life and education ==
Morrissey is the son of Michelle A. and Coleman Webb of Milford, Delaware. He is a 1986 graduate of Milford High School.

He graduated from Bloomsburg University of Pennsylvania in 1990 with a BA degree in political science. He received an M.A. degree in 2002 from the School of Advanced Military Studies and an M.S. degree in national security in 2012 from the National War College. He also attended a Massachusetts Institute of Technology seminar.

== Military career ==
Morrissey first enlisted in the United States Army Reserve in 1986. In 1990, he received his commission in the United States Army after graduating from Bloomsbury University.

From June 2008 to April 2011, Morrissey commanded the 5th Battalion, 5th Air Defense Artillery Regiment, which operated a counter rocket, artillery, and mortar system in support of Operation Iraqi Freedom and Operation New Dawn.

Morrissey commanded the 31st Air Defense Artillery Brigade from July 2012 to June 2014, when they deployed Operation Enduring Freedom. He was then assigned as a legislative affairs staffer in the Office of the Secretary of Defense until June 2017 when he was reassigned as the United States Army Central director of operations.

On February 2, 2018, Morrissey was promoted to brigadier general. On July 26, 2018, he took command of the 94th Army Air and Missile Defense Command from Sean A. Gainey. He relinquished command on February 11, 2020.

On February 26, 2020, he was assigned to the Missile Defense Agency as the director for test, where he oversaw testing of the RIM-161 Standard Missile 3, Terminal High Altitude Area Defense, and Aegis Combat System. He was promoted to major general on February 25, 2021.

In March 2022, Morrissey was reassigned as the director for plans and policy of the United States Space Command.

== Dates of promotion ==
Rank	Date
Brigadier general	February 2, 2018
Major general	February 25, 2021

Military offices
Preceded by Sean A. Gainey	Commanding General of the 94th Army Air and Missile Defense Command; 2018–2020	Succeeded by Mark A. Holler
Preceded by Douglas Gabram	Director for Test of the Missile Defense Agency; 2020–2022	Succeeded by Douglas L. Williams
Preceded by Mike Bernacchi	Director of Plans and Policy of the United States Space Command; 2022–2023	Succeeded by Brian W. Gibson
