= Andrew P. Hansen =

U.S. Air Force general

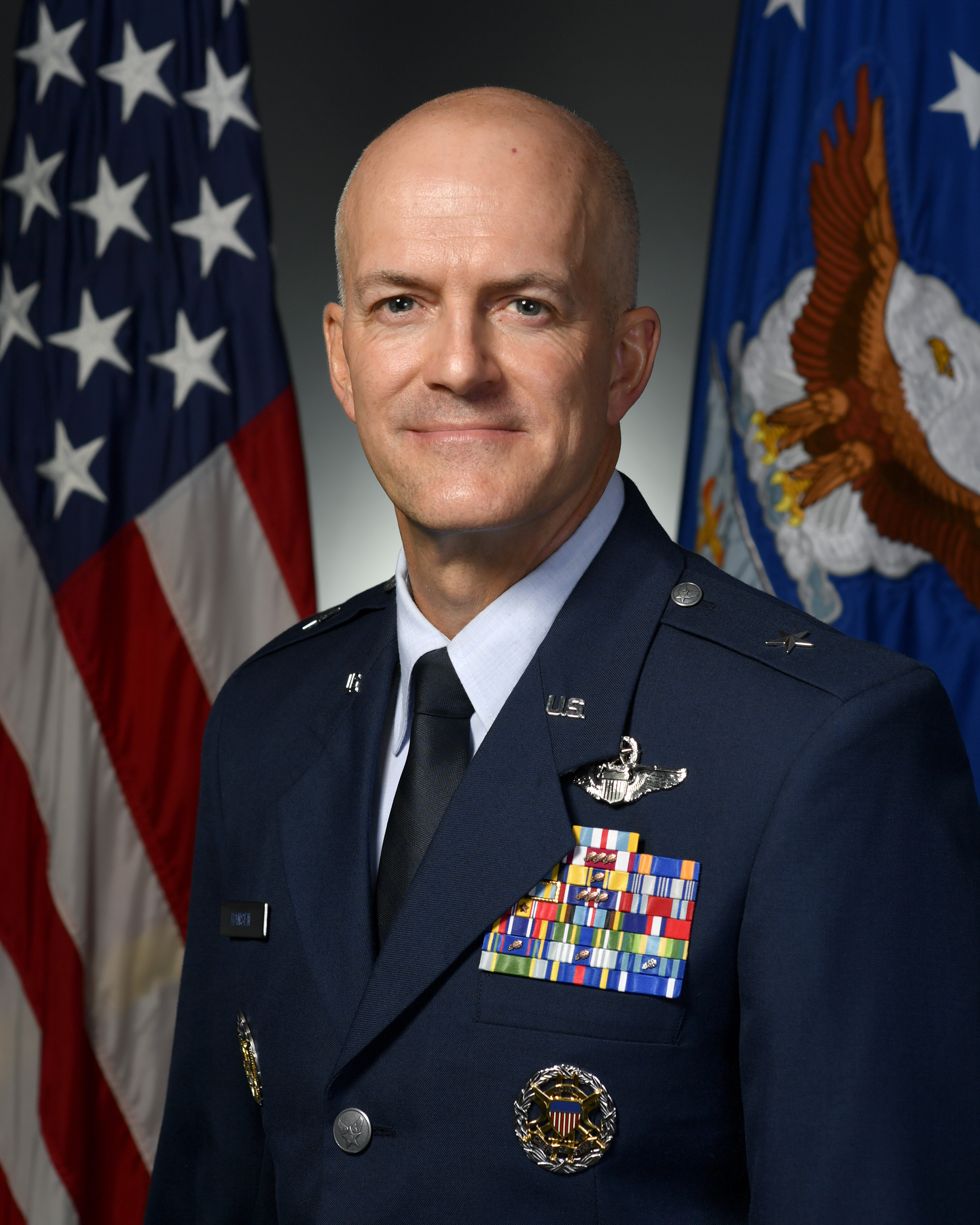
- Official portrait, 2021
- Military career
- Allegiance: United States
- Branch: United States Air Force
- Service years: 1993–present
- Rank: Brigadier General
- Nickname: Popeye
- Commands: 51st Fighter Wing; 18th Aggressor Squadron
- Awards: Defense Superior Service Medal; Legion of Merit (2)

Andrew P. Hansen is a retired United States Air Force brigadier general who last served as the Deputy Chief of Staff for Operations for the Allied Air Command. Prior to that, he was the Director of United States Air Forces in Europe-United Kingdom.

Military offices
Preceded by Brook J. Leonard	Commander of the 51st Fighter Wing; 2015–2017	Succeeded by William D. Betts
Preceded by ???	Director of Joint and National Security Council Matters of the United States Air Force; 2017–2018	Succeeded by David Mineau
Preceded by ???	Director of United States Air Forces in Europe-United Kingdom; 2018–2019	Succeeded by Mark Ciero
Preceded by Charles Corcoran	Deputy Chief of Staff for Operations of the Allied Air Command; 2019–2021	Succeeded by Joel Carey
