= Clement Coward =

U.S. Army general

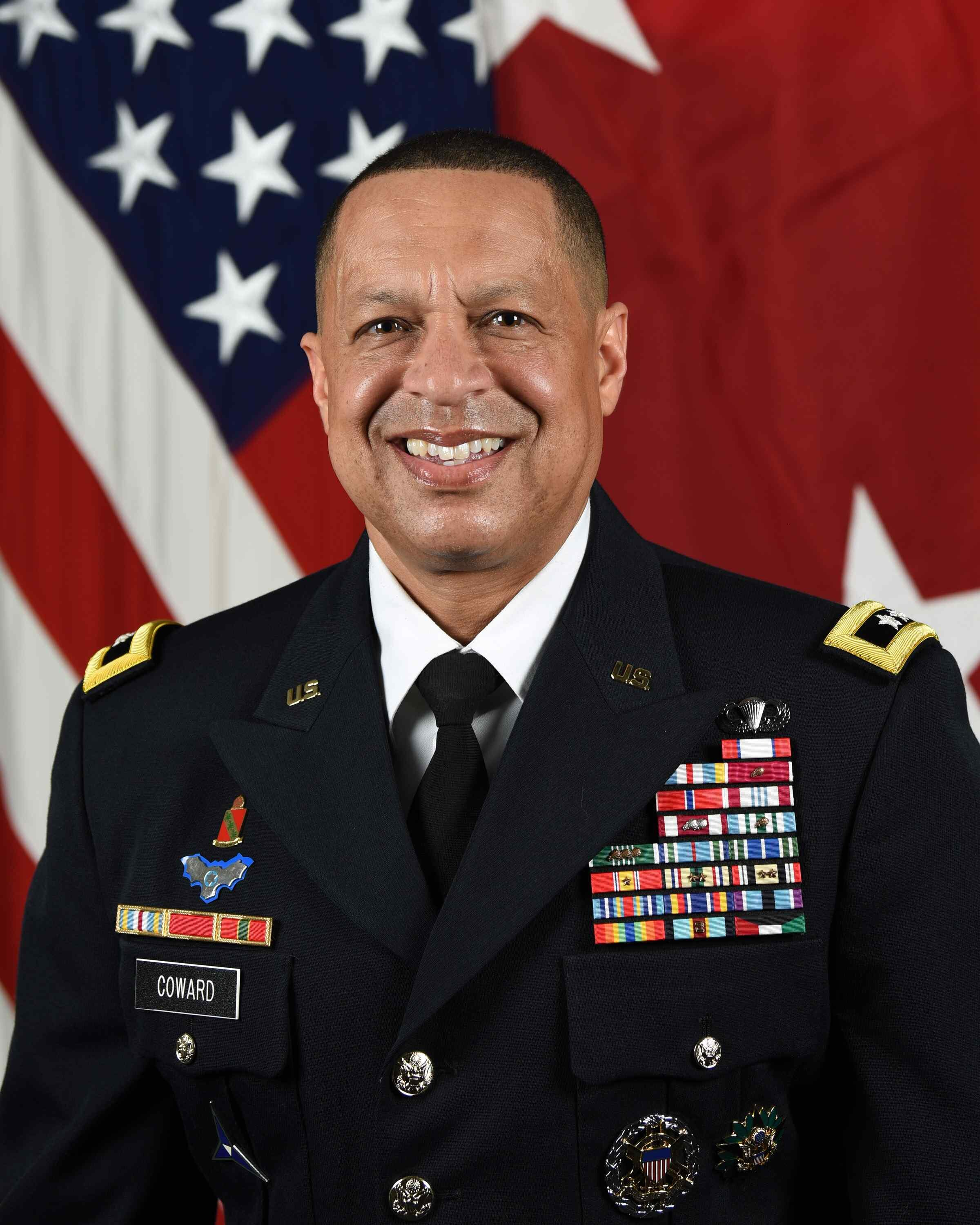
- Official portrait, 2021
- Military career
- Allegiance: United States
- Branch: United States Army
- Service years: 1989–2022
- Rank: Major General
- Commands: 32nd Army Air and Missile Defense Command; 11th Air Defense Artillery Brigade; 3rd Battalion, 43rd Air Defense Artillery Regiment
- Conflicts: Gulf War; Iraq War
- Awards: Army Distinguished Service Medal; Defense Superior Service Medal; Legion of Merit (2); Bronze Star Medal

Clement S. Coward Jr. is a retired United States Army major general who has served as the Director of the Sexual Assault Prevention and Response Office of the Office of the Under Secretary of Defense for Personnel and Readiness since September 2020. Previously, he served as the Commanding General of the 32nd Army Air and Missile Defense Command from November 2018 to August 2020. Raised in Fayetteville, North Carolina, Coward earned a Bachelor of Arts degree in speech communications from the University of North Carolina at Wilmington in 1989. He later received a Master of Arts degree in national security and strategic studies from the Naval War College and a Master of Science degree in strategic studies from the United States Army War College.

Military offices
Preceded by ???	Deputy Director of Force Protection of the Joint Staff; 2017–2018	Succeeded by Sean A. Gainey
Preceded by Christopher L. Spillman	Commanding General of the 32nd Army Air and Missile Defense Command; 2018–2020	Succeeded by David F. Stewart
Preceded by ???	Director of the Sexual Assault Prevention and Response Office of the Office of the Under Secretary of Defense for Personnel and Readiness; 2020–present	Incumbent
