= Brian W. Gibson =

US Army general officer

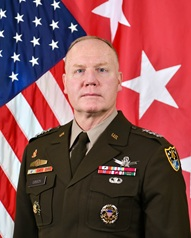
- Official portrait, 2026
- Born: c. 1970 (age 55–56)
- Military career
- Allegiance: United States
- Branch: United States Army
- Rank: Lieutenant General
- Service number: 1992–present
- Commands: 94th Army Air and Missile Defense Command; Air and Missile Defense Cross Functional Team; United States Army Air Defense Artillery School; 1st Battalion, 44th Air and Missile Defense
- Awards: Army Distinguished Service Medal; Defense Superior Service Medal; Legion of Merit

Brian W. Gibson (born c. 1970) is a United States Army lieutenant general who serves as the director of plans and policy of the United States Space Command. He previously served as the commanding general of the 94th Army Air and Missile Defense Command.

In November 2023, Gibson was assigned as director of plans and programs of the United States Space Command.

Military offices
Preceded by Randall A. McIntire	Commandant of the United States Army Air Defense Artillery School; 2018–2019	Succeeded by Mark A. Holler
New unit	Director of the Air and Missile Defense Cross Functional Team; 2019–2022	Succeeded by Patrick M. Costello
Preceded by Mark A. Holler	Commanding General of the 94th Army Air and Missile Defense Command; 2022–2023	Succeeded by Patrick M. Costello
Preceded by Michael T. Morrissey	Director of Plans and Policy of the United States Space Command; 2023–2026	Succeeded by Maurice O. Barnett
