= Har Qeren =

Mountain in Israel

- Jabal Kayrin

Highest point
- Elevation: 365 m (1,198 ft)
- Coordinates: 30.9964°N 34.4856°E

Naming
- Native name: Hebrew: הר קרן

Geography
- Country: Israel
- District: Southern District

Har Qeren (Hebrew: הר קרן) is a mountain in Israel. Har Qeren is located in the Southern District. Har Qeren is located 365 meters above sea level. There is a U.S. military radar station here, known as Site 512.

The highest place nearby is Har Safun, 456 meters (1,496 ft) above sea level, 19.3 kilometres (12.0 miles) southeast of Har Qeren. (Note: The highest point above the local horizon, according to the elevation data of GeoNames.)

The climate is hot dry. The average temperature is 24 °C. The warmest month is August, at 34 °C, and the coldest is January, at 12 °C. The average rainfall is 130 millimeters per year. The wettest month is January, with 31 millimeters of rain, and the driest is June, with 1 millimeters.

Har Qeren

Climate chart (precipitation, max. and min. temperature)
J	F	M	A	M	J	J	A	S	O	N	D
31 18 6	23 21 7	19 29 10	1 34 12	10 41 16	1 46 20	1 44 22	1 44 23	1 41 20	3 36 17	16 28 11	21 21 7
- █ Average max. and min. temperatures in °C
- █ Precipitation totals in mm
Imperial conversion
J	F	M	A	M	J	J	A	S	O	N	D
1.2 64 43	0.9 70 45	0.7 84 50	0 93 54	0.4 106 61	0 115 68	0 111 72	0 111 73	0 106 68	0.1 97 63	0.6 82 52	0.8 70 45
- █ Average max. and min. temperatures in °F
- █ Precipitation totals in inches

== Flora and Environment ==
The area surrounding Har Qeren is characterized by stabilized and semi-stabilized sand dunes which support unique desert vegetation. During the late winter, specifically between late February and mid-March, the base of the mountain and its access trails become a prime viewing location for the spectacular blooming of the Negev Iris (Iris mariae), a rare and protected endemic wildflower. In addition to the irises, the sandy terrain supports other desert flora such as the Rumex cyprius (red sorrel) and white broom (Retama raetam) bushes. Due to the sensitive security nature of the area and its adjacent military firing zones, visitors looking to see the blooms are required to follow marked paths and check safety updates prior to arrival.

Location of Har Qeren in Israel.
