= 117th Space Battalion =

- Active: 20 October 2007 - present
- Country: United States
- Nickname: Space Cowboys
- Motto: "Guardians of Space"
- Website: co.ng.mil/Army/Space-Support-Bn

Insignia
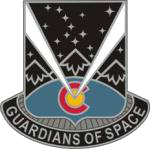
- Distinctive unit insignia

The 117th Space Battalion is a battalion of the Colorado National Guard constituted in 2006. Nicknamed the "Space Cowboys", by 2018 the unit was one of the most deployed in the National Guard of the United States.

On 20 October 2007 the provisional 193rd Space Battalion became a permanent-status unit, the 117th Space Battalion. The 117th Space Battalion is not part of 1st Space Brigade and is controlled by the National Guard. However, it has a Training, Readiness, Oversight (TRO) relationship with 1st Space Brigade.

== See also ==
- United States Space Command
