= Site 512 =

US military radar site in Israel

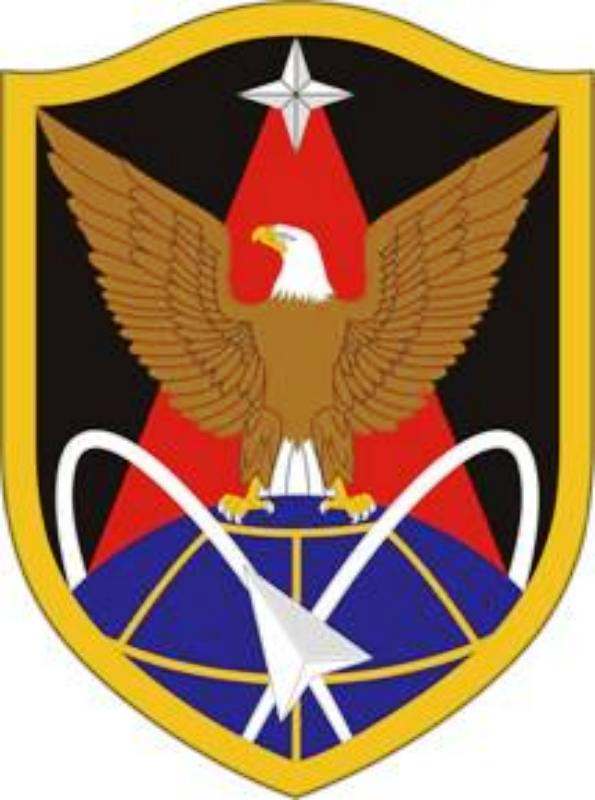
Site 512
- Har Qeren, Negev; Near Kmehin in Israel

Site information
- Operator: 1st Space Brigade
- Controlled by: United States Army Space and Missile Defense Command

Location
- Coordinates: 30.995952°N 34.494353°E

Site 512 is the name given to a United States Department of Defense radar facility atop Har Qeren in Israel's Negev desert to provide ballistic missile early warning against launches by Iran or its proxy groups against Israel and other US allies in the Middle East.

The site houses a AN/TPY-2 Surveillance Transportable Radar operated in 2021 by the United States Army's 1st Space Brigade. Originally operated by approximately 100 soldiers, that number has increased significantly since the site's initial construction, with a $35.8 million expansion in 2023 increasing the base's capacity to 1000.

Other data indicates that the operating unit is now the 13th Missile Defense Battery, 52nd Air Defense Artillery Brigade, 10th Army Air and Missile Defense Command, United States Army Europe.

One of a number of facilities operated under the auspices of the Missile Defense Agency's focus on protecting against potential missile launches from smaller, regional actors such as Iran and North Korea, the base operates alongside similar AN/TPY-2 radar positions in Japan and another clandestine site called Site K, the Kürecik Radar Station, near Malatya, Turkey.

== See also ==
- Israel–United States military relations

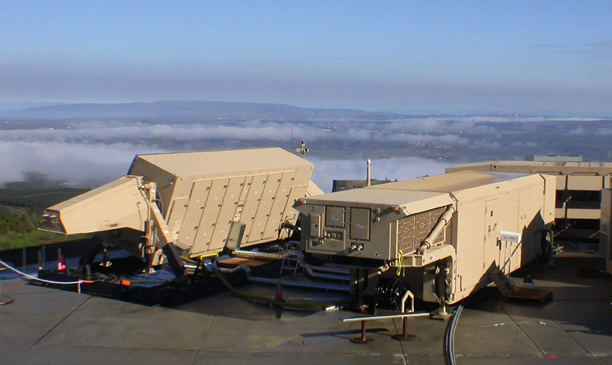
View from the back on a deployed TPY-2 radar
