= Tim C. Lawson =

U.S. Space Command acting deputy commander

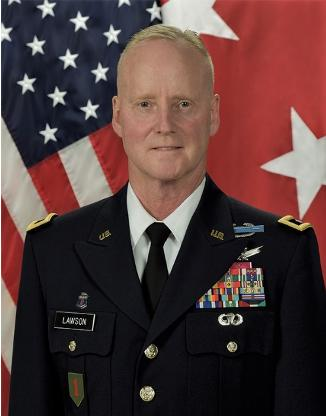
- Military career
- Allegiance: United States
- Branch: United States Army
- Service years: 1988–2022
- Rank: Major General
- Commands: 100th Missile Defense Brigade; 32nd Infantry Brigade Combat Team
- Conflicts: Gulf War; War in Afghanistan
- Awards: Legion of Merit (3); Bronze Star Medal (2)

Tim C. Lawson is a retired United States Army major general who last served as the mobilization assistant to the commander of the United States Space Command. He previously served as the deputy commanding general for operations of the United States Army Space and Missile Defense Command.

== Awards and decorations ==
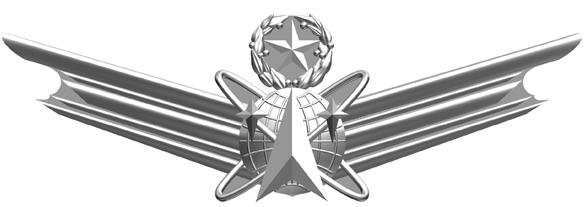
Combat Infantryman Badge
Master Space Operations Badge
Basic Parachutist Badge
1st Infantry Division Shoulder Sleeve Insignia
Unidentified Distinctive Unit Insignia
? Overseas Service Bars

Legion of Merit with two bronze oak leaf clusters
Bronze Star Medal with oak leaf cluster
Defense Meritorious Service Medal
Meritorious Service Medal with three oak leaf clusters
Army Commendation Medal with silver oak leaf cluster
Army Achievement Medal with oak leaf cluster
Army Reserve Component Achievement Medal with oak leaf cluster
National Defense Service Medal with one bronze service star
Southwest Asia Service Medal with three service stars
Afghanistan Campaign Medal
Global War on Terrorism Service Medal
Armed Forces Reserve Medal with gold Hourglass device, "M" device and bronze award numeral 2
Army Service Ribbon
Army Overseas Service Ribbon
Reserve Overseas Training Ribbon with award numeral 2
NATO Medal for service with ISAF
Kuwait Liberation Medal (Saudi Arabia)
Kuwait Liberation Medal (Kuwait)

Military offices
Preceded by Gregory S. Bowen	Deputy Commanding General for Operations of the United States Army Space and Missile Defense Command; 2017–2019	Succeeded by David F. Stewart
Preceded by James H. Dickinson	Deputy Commander of the United States Space Command; Acting; 2020	Succeeded by John E. Shaw
New office	Mobilization Assistant to the Commander of the United States Space Command; 2019–2022	Succeeded by Robert Claude
