= Damon S. Feltman =

U.S. Air Force general

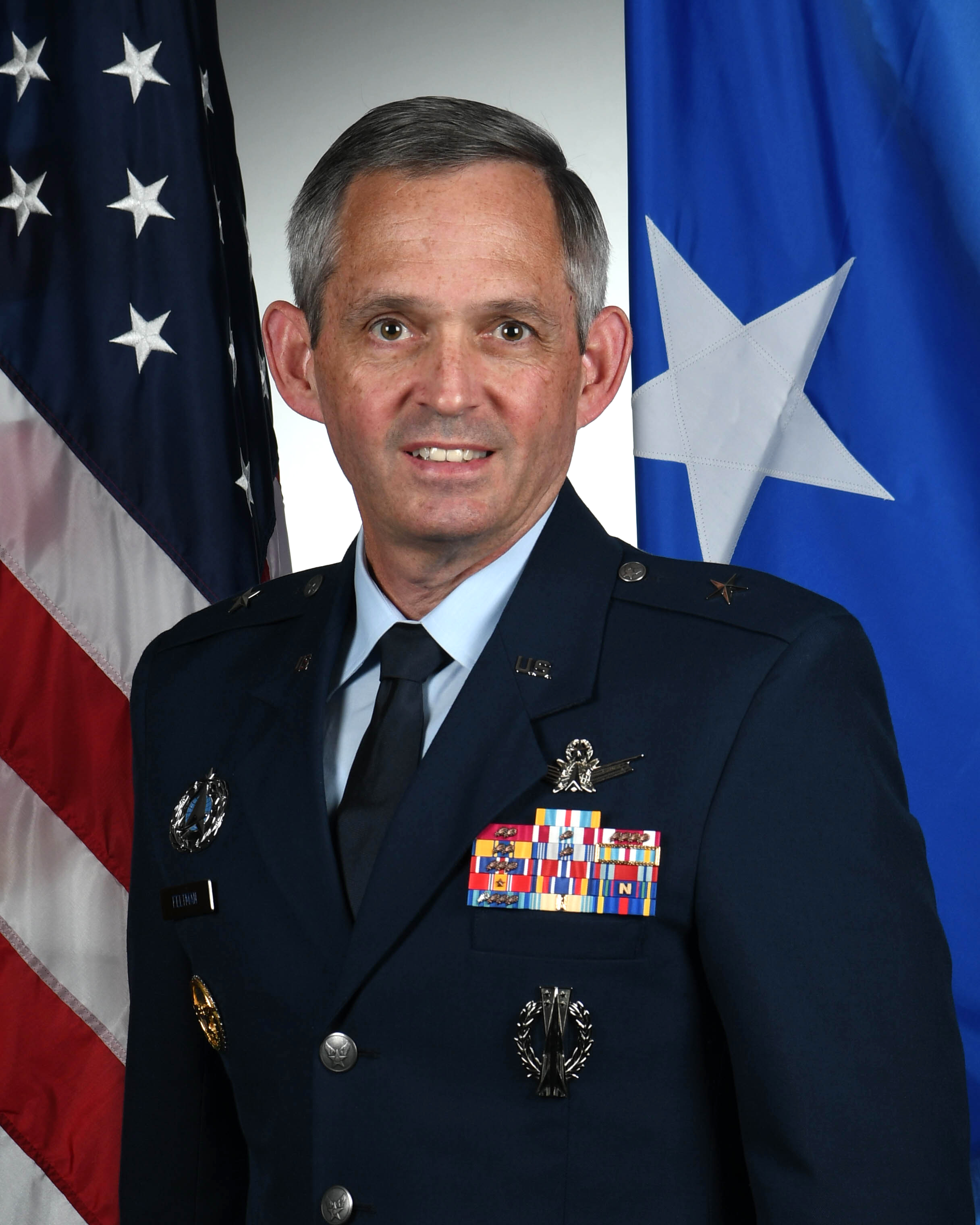
- Official portrait, 2022
- Military career
- Allegiance: United States
- Branch: United States Air Force
- Service years: 1991–present
- Rank: Brigadier general
- Commands: 310th Space Wing; 19th Space Operations Squadron
- Awards: Legion of Merit

Damon S. Feltman is a United States Air Force brigadier general serving as the mobilization assistant to the deputy chief of space operations for strategy, plans, programs, requirements, and analysis of the United States Space Force. He previously served as the mobilization assistant to the director of operations of the United States Space Command

Military offices
Preceded by Jeffrey T. Mineo	Commander of the 310th Space Wing; 2014–2016	Succeeded by Traci Kueker-Murphy
Preceded by Pamela J. Lincoln	Mobilization Assistant to the Commander of the 14th Air Force; 2018–2019	Succeeded by Jody Merritt
New title	Mobilization Assistant to the Director of Operations, Training, and Force Development of the United States Space Command; 2019–2021	Succeeded by Robert Claude
Preceded by Robert Claude	Mobilization Assistant to the Deputy Chief of Space Operations for Strategy, Plans, Programs, Requirements, and Analysis of the United States Space Force; 2022–present	Incumbent
