= 1st Space Brigade =

U.S. Army unit

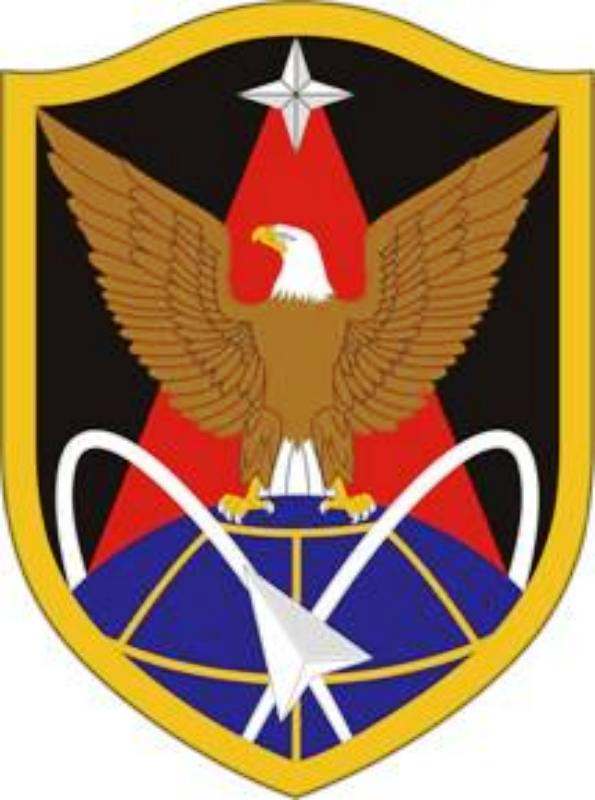
- Brigade shoulder sleeve insignia
- Active: 2005–present
- Country: United States
- Branch: United States Army
- Role: Space operations
- Size: Brigade
- Part of: United States Army Space and Missile Defense Command
- Headquarters: Colorado Springs, Colorado, U.S.
- Engagements: 2026 Iran war
- Website: www.smdc.army.mil/ORGANIZATION/1st-Space-Brigade/

Commanders
- Commander: COL Mark A. Cobos
- CSM: CSM Maurice L. Tucker

Insignia
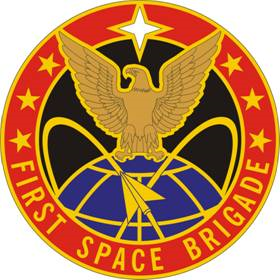
- Distinctive unit insignia

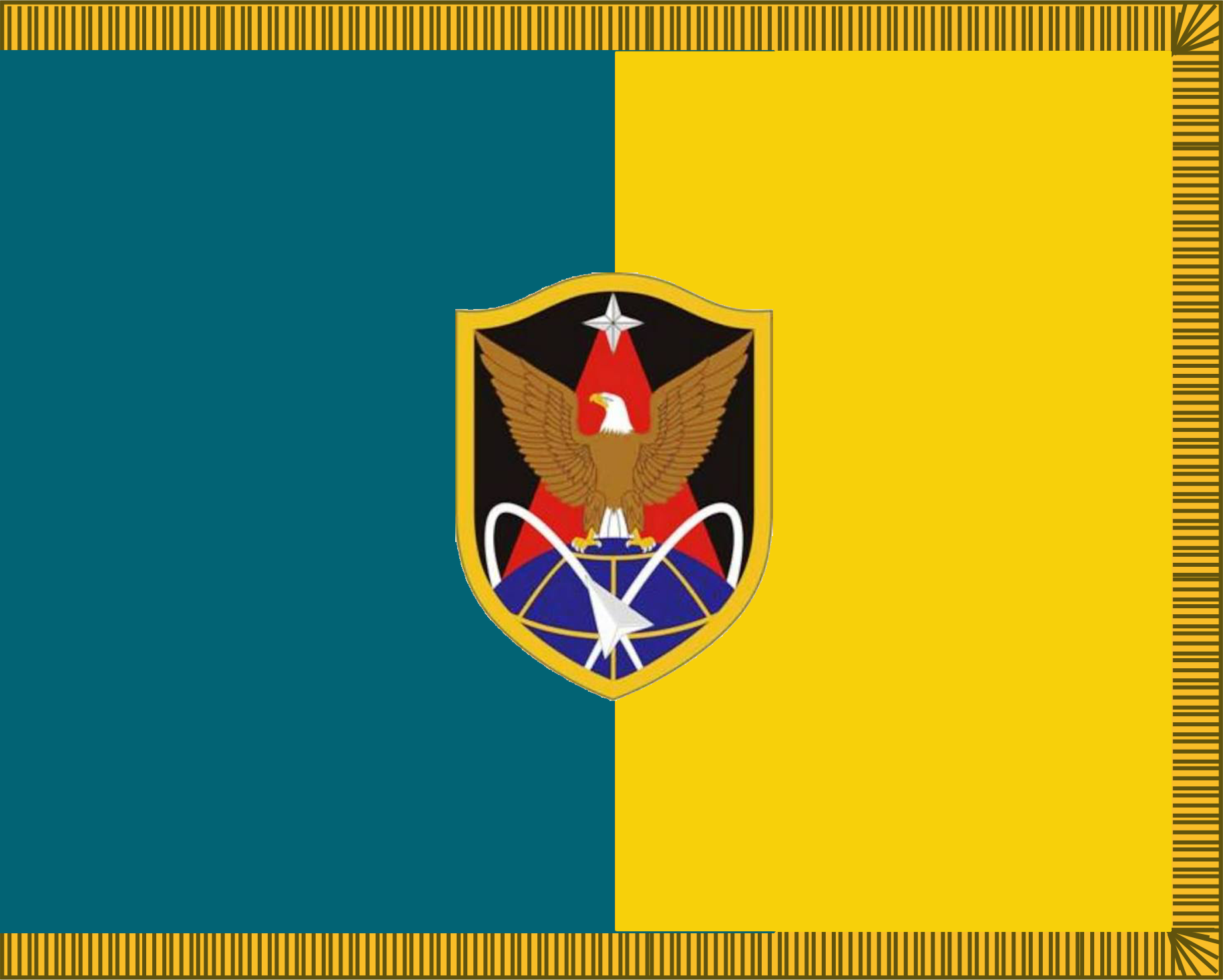
- 1st Space Brigade Flag

The 1st Space Brigade is a United States Army unit. Assigned to the United States Army Space and Missile Defense Command, it is responsible for providing space combat power support to Army units. Activated in 2005 as a TOE unit after being provisionally active since 2003, it is headquartered at Colorado Springs, Colorado.

The 1st Space Brigade (Provisional) was activated in May 2003, with the 1st Space Battalion, the 1st Satellite Control Battalion (later to become the 53rd Signal Battalion), and the 193rd Space Battalion (Colorado Army National Guard). On 20 October 2007 the provisional 193rd Space Battalion became a permanent-status unit, the 117th Space Battalion.

The provisional brigade's mission was to "conduct continuous, global space support, space control and space force enhancement operations in support of U.S. Strategic Command and Supported Combatant Commanders enabling the delivery of decisive combat power."

53rd Signal Battalion (SATCON) conducted payload and transmission control of the Defense Satellite Communications System and Wideband Global Satellite Communications System constellations. It was later reorganised and transferred to the Space Force.

In Fiscal Year 2019, five missile defense batteries were assigned to 1st Space Brigade including two in Japan and one each in Israel, Turkey, and Qatar.

In 2026, elements of the 1st Space Brigade were deployed to Prince Sultan Air Base, Saudi Arabia in support of Operation Epic Fury.

== Structure ==
Distinctive unit insignia	Name	Headquarters	Subordinate units
	1st Space Battalion	Fort Carson, Colorado	Headquarters and Headquarters Company; 2nd Space Company (Space Control); 4th Space Company (Army Space Support Team); 18th Space Company (Army Space Support Team); 24th Missile Defense Service Battery
	2nd Space Battalion (Army Reserve)	Fort Carson, Colorado	Headquarters and Headquarters Company; 3rd Space Company (Army Space Support Team); 5th Space Company (Army Space Support Team); 6th Space Company(Army Space Support Team); 8th Space Company (Space Control); 23rd Space Company (Space Control)
	117th Space Battalion (Colorado Army National Guard)	Fort Carson, Colorado	Headquarters and Headquarters Company; 217th Space Company (Army Space Support Team); 1158th Space Company (Army Space Support Team)

- 10th Missile Defense Battery, Shariki, Japan
- 11th Missile Defense Battery, Turkey
- 12th Missile Defense Battery, Saudi Arabia
- 13th Missile Defense Battery, Israel
- 14th Missile Defense Battery, Kyogamisaki, Japan

The brigade also has five missile defense batteries equipped with AN/TPY-2 forward-based radar conducting ballistic missile tracking operations in support of theater and homeland defense. The forward-based radar may also be used to conduct space surveillance and data collection. In 2023, the brigade also operated Site 512, a United States Department of Defence radar facility in Negev, Israel.

The 117th Space Battalion, Colorado Army National Guard has a training, readiness, and oversight (TRO) relationship with the 1st Space Brigade but is not actually part of it, as of 2021.

== List of commanders ==
- COL Timothy R. Coffin, 27 July 2006
- COL Jeffrey A. Farnsworth, 10 July 2008
- COL Eric P. Henderson, 30 June 2010
- COL James R. Meisinger, July 2012
- COL Thomas L. James, 11 July 2014
- COL Richard Zellmann, 21 June 2016
- COL Eric D. Little, 13 July 2018
- COL Brian C. Bolio, 1 July 2020
- LTC Whitney Hall, ~2020 (acting)
- COL Donald K. Brooks, 5 March 2021

== See also ==
- U.S. Army Satellite Operations Brigade
