= Pamela J. Lincoln =

U.S. Air Force general

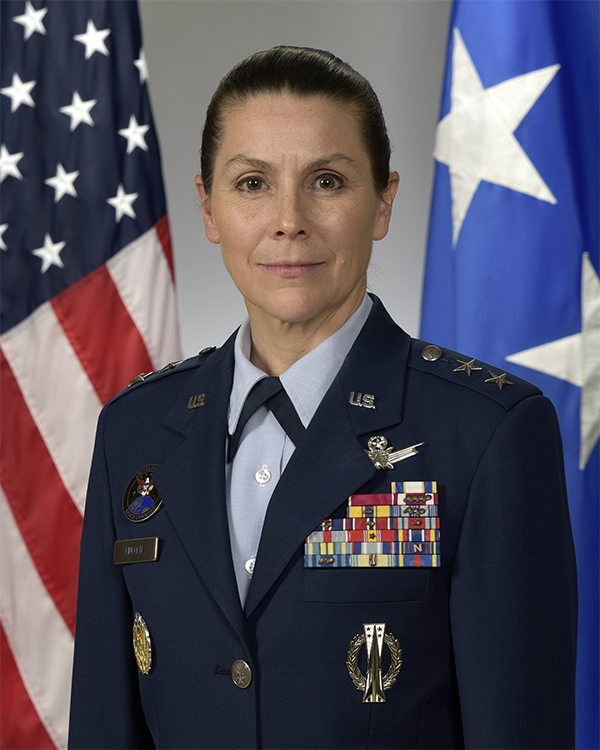
- Military career
- Allegiance: United States
- Branch: United States Air Force
- Service years: 1989–2021
- Rank: Major General
- Commands: 19th Space Operations Squadron
- Awards: Air Force Distinguished Service Medal; Legion of Merit

Pamela J. Lincoln is a retired United States Air Force major general who had served as the mobilization assistant to the commander of the United States Space Command. Prior to that, she was the mobilization assistant to the Chief of Staff of the United States Air Force.

Military offices
Preceded by ???	Vice Commander of the 310th Space Wing; 2011–2014	Succeeded by Robert Claude
Preceded by ???	Mobilization Assistant to the Commander of the 14th Air Force; 2015–2018	Succeeded by Damon S. Feltman
New office	Mobilization Assistant to the Commander of the United States Space Command; 2019–2021	Succeeded by Ryan Okahara
