= Sean Gainey =

U.S. Army general

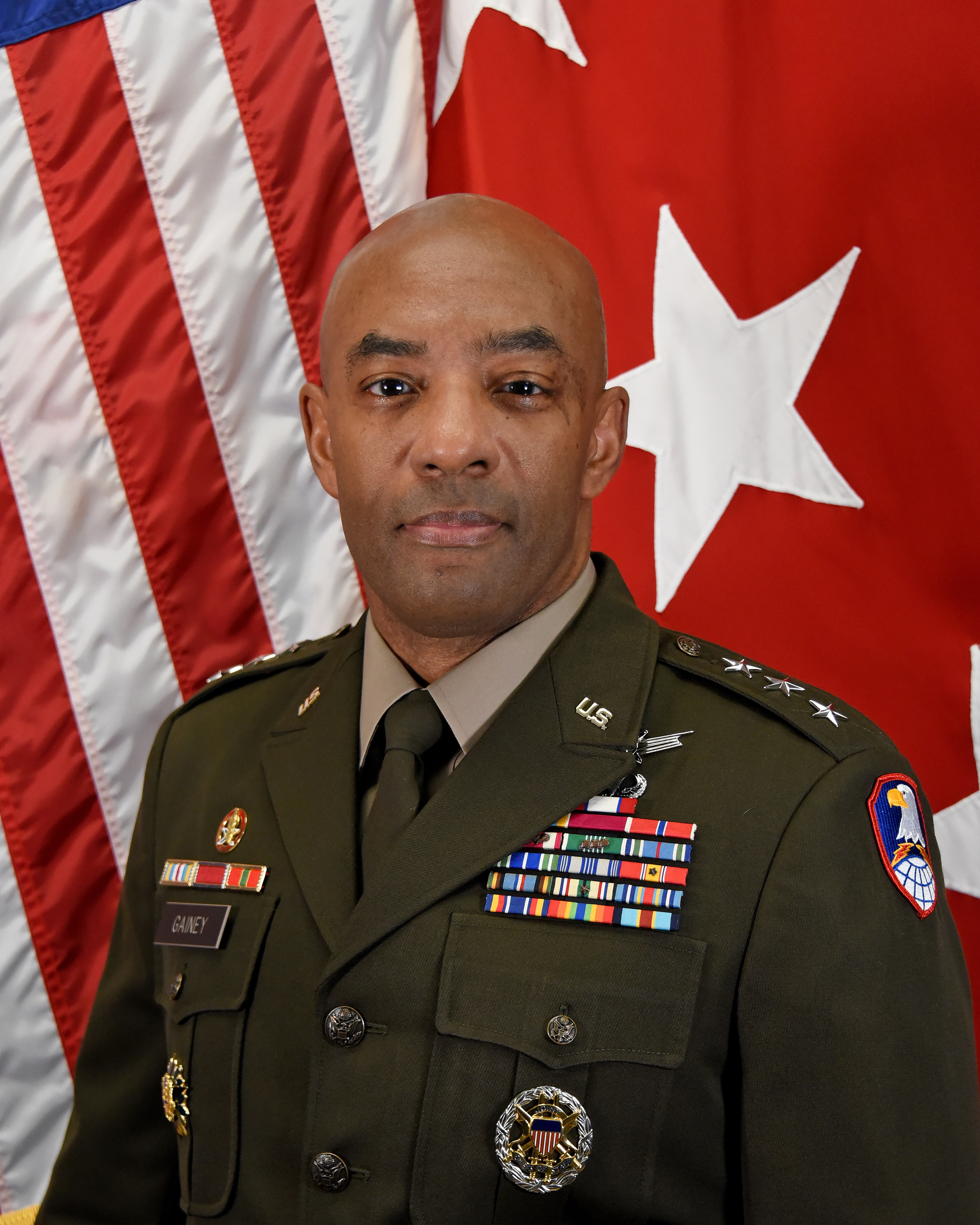
- Official portrait, 2024
- Military career
- Allegiance: United States
- Branch: United States Army
- Service years: 1990–2026
- Rank: Lieutenant General
- Commands: United States Army Space and Missile Defense Command; Joint Counter-Unmanned Aircraft Systems Office; 94th Army Air and Missile Defense Command; 108th Air Defense Artillery Brigade; 5th Battalion, 7th Air Defense Artillery Regiment
- Awards: Army Distinguished Service Medal; Defense Superior Service Medal; Legion of Merit

Sean A. Gainey is a retired United States Army lieutenant general who served as the commanding general of the United States Army Space and Missile Defense Command. He previously served as the Director of the Joint Counter-Unmanned Aircraft Systems Office and Director of Fires of the U.S. Army.

In January 2023, Gainey was nominated for promotion to lieutenant general and assignment as the commanding general of the U.S. Army Space and Missile Defense Command.

Military offices
Preceded by Eric L. Sanchez	Commanding General of the 94th Army Air and Missile Defense Command; 2016–2018	Succeeded by Michael T. Morrissey
Preceded by Clement Coward	Deputy Director of Force Protection of the Joint Staff; 2018–2020	Succeeded by John V. Fuller
New office	Director of the Counter-Unmanned Aircraft Systems Office and Director of Fires of the United States Army; 2020–2024	Succeeded by David F. Stewart
Preceded by Daniel L. Karbler	Commanding General of the United States Army Space and Missile Defense Command; 2024–2026	Succeeded by John L. Rafferty Jr.
