= Eric D. Little =

U.S. Army general

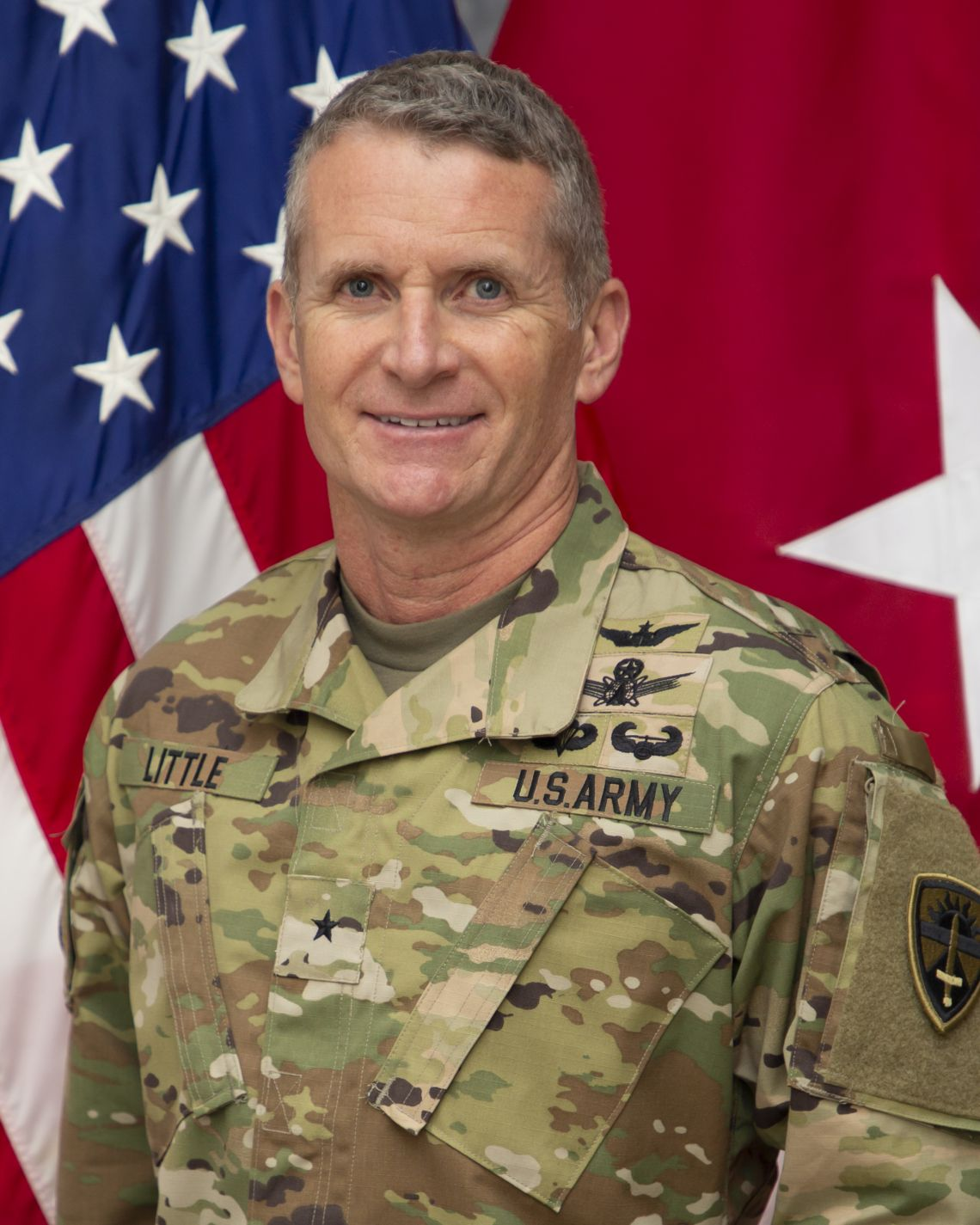
- Official portrait, 2021
- Military career
- Allegiance: United States
- Branch: United States Army
- Service years: 1993–present
- Rank: Brigadier General
- Commands: White Sands Missile Range; 1st Space Brigade; 1st Space Company, 1st Space Battalion

Eric D. Little is a United States Army brigadier general who serves as the deputy director for operations of the United States Space Command. He previously served as commanding general of the White Sands Missile Range and deputy commanding general for developmental testing of the United States Army Test and Evaluation Command from May 2021 to November 2023.

== Military career ==
Little received his commission in 1993 through ROTC at the University of Colorado at Colorado Springs. Commissioned as an aviation officer, he completed the Initial Entry Rotary Wing and Aviation Officer Basic Courses in June 1994 and was assigned to 1st Battalion, 501st Aviation Regiment at Camp Coiner and Seoul Air Base, Republic of Korea, where he served as battalion assistant S-4 and a UH-1 platoon leader.

Upon completion of the UH-60 Qualification Course at Fort Rucker, Alabama, in 1995, he was assigned to 4th Battalion, 101st Airborne Division (Air Assault) as a UH-60 platoon leader, POL platoon leader, and assistant S-3. In 1998, he attended the Aviation Officer Advanced Course at Fort Rucker followed by assignment to 3-58th Aviation Regiment (ATS) in Wiesbaden, Germany, with duties as assistant S-3 and battalion S-1.

Little then assumed command of C Company, 5-158th Aviation Regiment in Giebelstadt, Germany, in 2000. Upon completion of command, he was assigned to Fort Carson, Colorado, as the deputy G-3 Air for the 7th Infantry Division. In 2002, he assumed command of Stetson Troop, 3d Armored Cavalry Regiment, deploying the troop to Operation Iraqi Freedom in 2003. Returning from Iraq, Little was assigned to Fort Carson as the G-3 Air for the 7th Infantry Division.

In 2005, he transitioned to USASMDC/ARSTRAT with a primary duty to stand up the Joint Functional Component Command for Integrated Missile Defense at Schriever Air Force Base, Colorado, and later served as the J37 for that command. In 2006, he moved to Quantico, Virginia, as a student at the Marine Corps Command and Staff College. Upon completion, Little was accepted as a Functional Area 40A, Space Operations Officer. He completed the Space Operations Officer Qualification course in late 2007 and returned to Colorado Springs with an assignment to Peterson Air Force Base, Colorado, serving in the 1st Space Battalion as an Army Space Support Team leader and later as commander, 1st Space Company. He then served as executive officer to the deputy commanding general, USASMDC/ARSTRAT.

In 2010, Little deployed to Al Udeid Air Base, Qatar, as the deputy director of Space Forces, U.S. Central Command. In 2011, he returned to Peterson AFB for a six-month assignment to the G33, USASMDC/ARSTRAT. He then attended the Joint Forces Staff College enroute to Kirtland Air Force Base, New Mexico, with duty at the Joint Navigation Warfare Center, U.S. Strategic Command. In 2014, he attended the Army War College at Carlisle Barracks, Pennsylvania, with subsequent assignment to U.S. Army Pacific as the director, Strategic Programs Division where he was responsible for Space, Cyber Electromagnetic Activities, and Special Technical Operations. In July 2018 he assumed command of the 1st Space Brigade at Fort Carson, Colorado. He became USASDMC's deputy commander for operations in July 2020.

Little earned a Bachelor of Science in business administration from the University of Colorado, a Master of Arts in public administration from Bowie State University, a Masters of Military Studies from the Marine Corps University, and a Master of Arts in strategic studies from the U.S. Army War College. He is a graduate of the U.S. Army War College, the Marine Corps Command and Staff College, the Joint Forces Staff College, the Space 300 Course, the Space Operations Officer Qualification Course, and the Combined Arms Service Staff School.

His awards and decorations include the Legion of Merit, the Bronze Star Medal (one oak leaf cluster), the Defense Meritorious Service Medal, the Meritorious Service Medal (three oak leaf clusters), the Air Medal, the Joint Service Commendation Medal, the Military Outstanding Volunteer Service Medal, the Senior Aviator Badge, the Master Space Badge, the Air Assault Badge and the Parachutist Badge. He is qualified in the UH-1, OH-58, and UH-60 aircraft. Little has four children.

== Dates of promotion ==
Rank	Date
Brigadier general	June 2, 2021

Military offices
Preceded by Richard Zellmann	Commander of the 1st Space Brigade; 2018–2020	Succeeded by Brian C. Bolio
Preceded by David F. Stewart	Deputy Commander for Operations of the United States Army Space and Missile Defense Command; 2020–2021	Succeeded by Matthew J. Schreiber; Acting
Preceded by David C. Trybula	Commanding General of the White Sands Missile Range and Deputy Commanding General for Developmental Testing of the United States Army Test and Evaluation Command; 2021–2023	Succeeded by George C. Turner
Preceded by Richard Zellmann	Deputy Director for Operations of the United States Space Command; 2023–present	Incumbent
