= Richard Zellmann =

Deputy Commander of U.S Space Command

Richard L. Zellmann
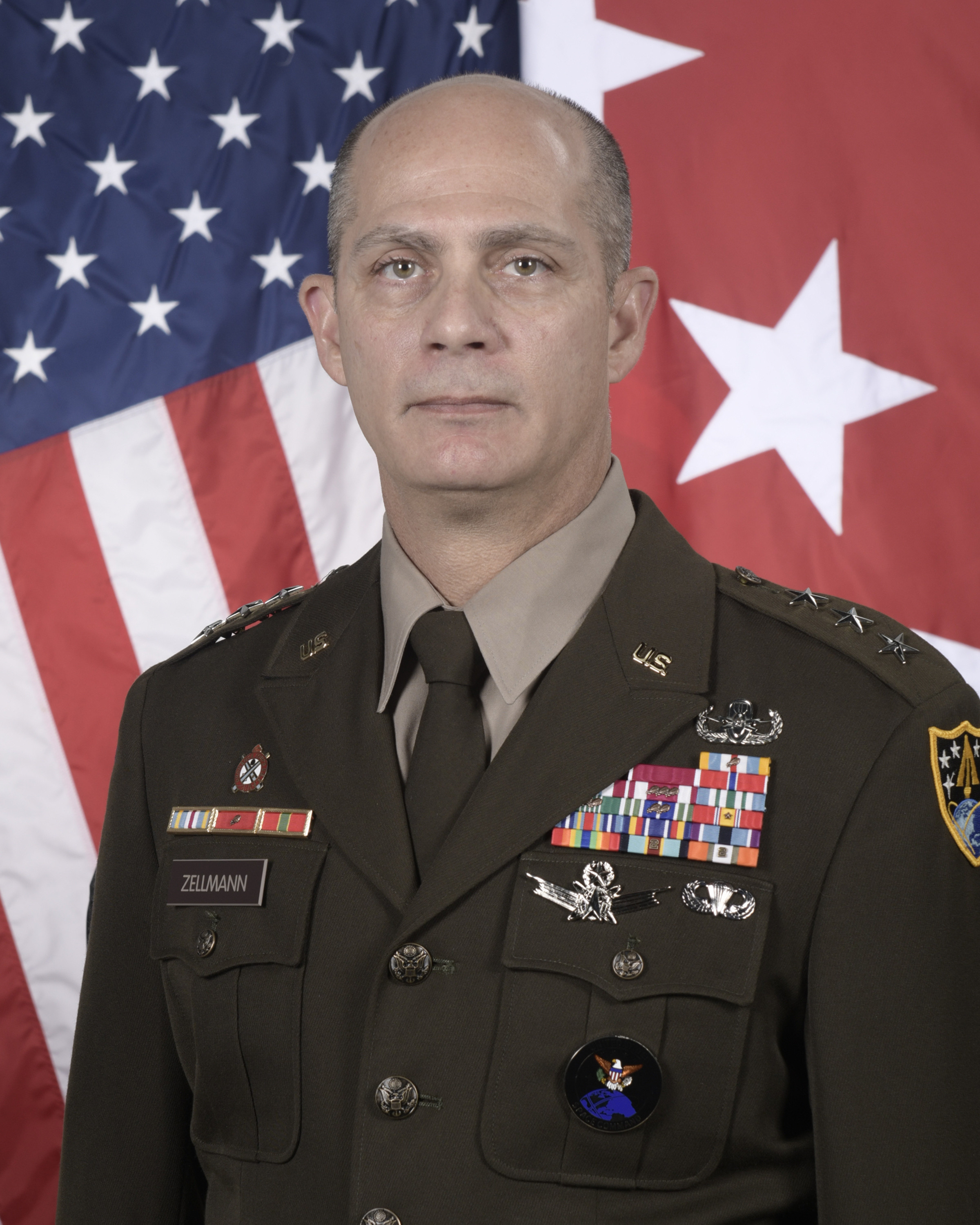
- Military career
- Allegiance: United States
- Branch: United States Army
- Service years: 1992–present
- Rank: Lieutenant General
- Commands: 1st Space Brigade; 1st Space Battalion
- Awards: Defense Distinguished Service Medal; Legion of Merit; Bronze Star Medal

Richard L. Zellmann is a United States Army lieutenant general who serves as the deputy commander of the United States Space Command. He previously served as the deputy combined joint force space component commander of the United States Space Command and the command's deputy director for operations.

In September 2023, Zellman was nominated for promotion to major general and promoted in December.

== Awards and Decorations ==
Zellmann was awarded the following decorations during his military career:

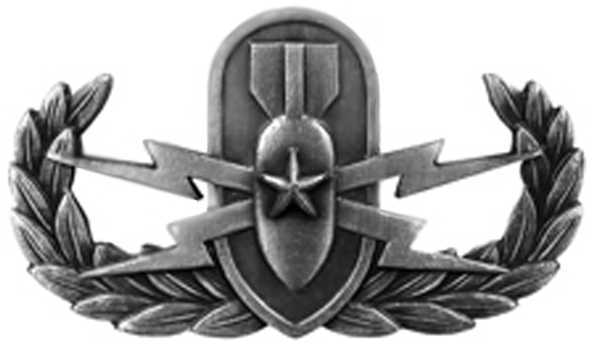

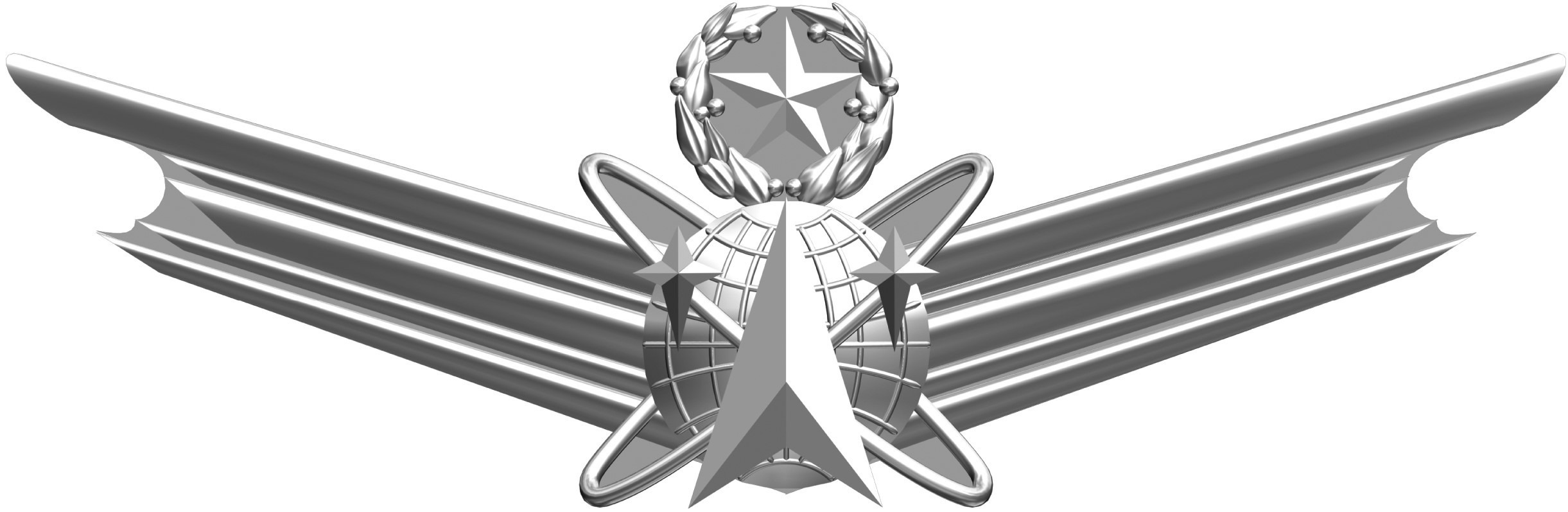

Senior Explosive Ordnance Disposal Badge
Defense Superior Service Medal with bronze oak leaf cluster	Legion of Merit	Bronze Star Medal
Defense Meritorious Service Medal	Meritorious Service Medal with three bronze oak leaf clusters	Joint Service Commendation Medal
Army Commendation Medal with two bronze oak leaf clusters	Army Achievement Medal with two bronze oak leaf clusters	National Defense Service Medal with bronze service star
Global War on Terrorism Expeditionary Medal	Global War on Terrorism Service Medal	Humanitarian Service Medal
Army Service Ribbon	Army Overseas Service Ribbon award numeral 2	Multinational Force and Observers Medal award numeral 2
Parachutist Badge		Command Space Operations Badge

Unit Awards
Joint Meritorious Unit Award	Army Meritorious Unit Commendation with bronze oak leaf cluster	Army Superior Unit Award

United States Space Command Badge
Ordnance Corps Regimental Insignia
3 Overseas Service Bars

== Dates of promotion ==
Rank	Date
Brigadier general	August 2, 2020
Major general	December 5, 2023
Lieutenant General	November 3, 2025

Military offices
Preceded by Thomas L. James	Commander of the 1st Space Brigade; 2016–2018	Succeeded by Eric D. Little
Preceded by ???	Director of Future Operations of the Joint Force Space Component Command; 2018–2019	Command redesignated
New office	Deputy Director for Strategy, Plans, and Policy of the United States Space Command; 2019–2021	Succeeded by Devin Pepper
Preceded by Shawn Bratton	Deputy Director for Operations of the United States Space Command; 2021–2023	Succeeded by Eric D. Little
New title	Deputy Combined Joint Force Space Component Commander of United States Space Command; 2023–2025	Succeeded by Kyle C. Paul
Preceded by Thomas L. James	Deputy Commander of the United States Space Command; 2025–present	Incumbent
