= Jody Merritt =

U.S. Air Force general

Jody A. Merritt
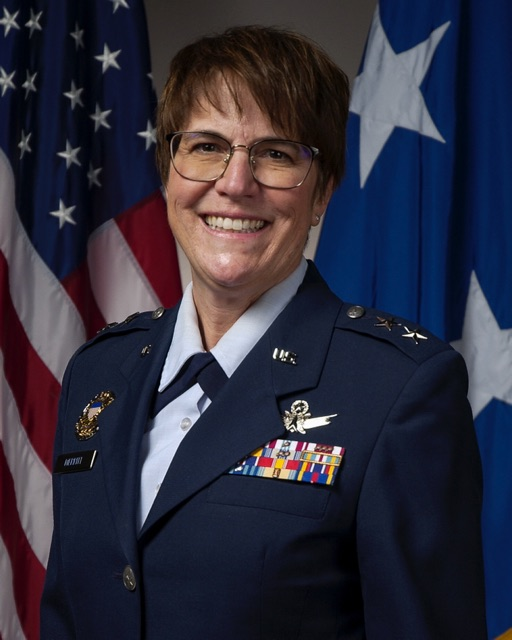
- Born: c. 1967 (age 58–59)
- Military career
- Allegiance: United States
- Branch: United States Air Force
- Service years: 1989–present
- Rank: Major General
- Commands: 6th Space Operations Squadron

Jody A. Merritt (born c. 1967) is a United States Air Force major general serving as the mobilization assistant to the commander of the United States Space Command. She previously served as the mobilization assistant to the commander of the Space Operations Command.

In January 2023, Merritt was nominated for promotion to major general.

Military offices
Preceded by ???	Mobilization Assistant to the Commander of the Space and Missile Systems Center; 2017–2019	Succeeded by John D. Cherry
Preceded by Damon S. Feltman	Mobilization Assistant to the Commander of Space Operations Command; 2019–2020	Command redesignated
Preceded by Damon S. Feltman	Mobilization Assistant to the Commander of the Combined Force Space Component Command; 2019–2021	Succeeded by Stephen E. Slade
New title	Mobilization Assistant to the Deputy Commander of Space Operations Command; 2020–2021	Succeeded by Stephen E. Slade
New title	Mobilization Assistant to the Commander of Space Operations Command; 2021–2024	Succeeded by Stephen E. Slade
Preceded by Robert Claude	Mobilization Assistant to the Commander of the United States Space Command; 2024–present	Incumbent
