= CJ Fraleigh =

American businessman

- Born: Christopher John Fraleigh; October 1, 1963 (age 62); New Jersey
- Occupation: Executive
- Known for: Cadillac re-launch Food-industry executive

Christopher "CJ" Fraleigh (born October 1, 1963) is an American food-industry executive. He is the Executive Chairman of an entity sponsored by private equity firm Kohlberg & Company to acquire the Sara Lee frozen bakery assets from Tyson Foods. Fraleigh is the former chairman and CEO of Shearer's Foods.

== Early life ==
Fraleigh was born in New Jersey, the son of Virginia Hughes and Frank Fraleigh, an Irish-American family. He grew up in Hackettstown, New Jersey, and attended Hackettstown High School. Fraleigh received a Bachelor of Science in industrial engineering in 1986 from Lehigh University, followed by an MBA in 1989 from Columbia University.

== Career ==
After leaving university, Fraleigh started at PepsiCo in New York, where he worked to develop the 1 liter (33.814 us fl oz) 'Wide Mouth' bottle as a single serving bottle for the US market, first under Mountain Dew. After becoming the VP of Colas, Fraleigh left for General Motors in 2001 where he fought to relaunch the Cadillac brand, working with Led Zeppelin among others to ensure success. He has been credited with turning the brand around. He also orchestrated with Oprah Winfrey the giveaway of a Pontiac G6 to all audience members at a taping of the Oprah Winfrey Show.

After becoming the general manager of Pontiac, Buick, and GMC it was said that he, Bob Lutz, and Rick Wagner disagreed on the future direction of the brands, with Fraleigh suggesting that brands needed to be shuttered for the company to stay afloat. Disagreeing with the company, Fraleigh left GM for (now defunct) Downers Grove, Illinois-based Sara-Lee, where he oversaw North America with former PepsiCo colleague Brenda Barnes. While preparing to split the company in two, The Wall Street Journal widely reported of internal change in direction, with Fraleigh and the board agreeing to part ways. Assuming his current position, he partnered with Windpoint Partners to acquire Ohio-based Shearer's Foods in a bid to create the largest private label snack food manufacturer. Fraleigh left Shearer's Foods in September 2017.

== Board roles ==
Fraleigh has also served on several boards of directors.

- Sabre Holdings (ended 2007)
- Darden Restaurants (ended 2014)
- Nonni's Food Company (current)

== Personal life ==
CJ Fraleigh lives in the Chicago area with his family.

== See also ==
- Shearer's Foods
- Hillshire Brands
- Pepsi
- Bob Lutz
- Rick Wagoner
- Brenda Barnes
