= The Semonski Sisters =

American family musical act

The Semonski Sisters are a family musical act that appeared on television's The Lawrence Welk Show from 1975 to 1977.

The sextet consisted of sisters Diane (born August 31, 1956), Donna (born April 20, 1958), Joanne (born July 23, 1960), Valerie (March 1, 1962 - May 22, 2022), Audrey (born March 28, 1963) and Michelle (born August 16, 1967). They were born and raised in Hackettstown, New Jersey to parents Joe and Roberta "Rusty" Semonski; the family was of Polish and Irish descent.

Musically gifted, the family moved to Altamonte Springs, Florida in 1974 and after just two months there, the sisters got to sing in public for the first time when they and their parents went to see Donald O'Connor perform at Disney World's Top Of The World dinner theater. O' Connor invited the girls onto the stage to perform two numbers. The band leader at Top of the World knew that Lawrence Welk was coming to Florida for the Disney Golf Classic, and he arranged an audition for the sisters with Welk at Channel 9 studios in Orlando, Florida. Encouraged by their audition, Welk invited them out to California to be on his show.

The Semonskis spent 2 1/2 seasons as members of Welk's Musical Family from 1975 to 1977. During their time with the show, the series as a whole had a far greater focus on musical skits (a medium at which the sextet was particularly adept) than it did without them. Eldest sister Diane left in late 1976 to pursue a solo singing and songwriting career, and the act was a quintet until they themselves left a year later.

Today Diane is employed by Fletcher Music in The Villages, Florida where she teaches residents how to play organ music. She also gives weekly performances singing songs from the Lawrence Welk Show.
