= Kenneth Hopper =

Scottish academic (1926–2019)

Kenneth Hopper (May 1926 – 20 May 2019) was a Scottish academic. His studies of the origins of America's factory management culture and its influence on Japanese factory management and elsewhere after World War II have received international recognition. He was the author of numerous academic and professional articles on manufacturing and management.

== Biographical Background ==
He was married to Claire White Hopper, a former bank executive, and lived in Hackettstown, New Jersey. His brother, William Hopper, is an investment banker, based in London. Kenneth Hopper was born in Glasgow, Scotland.

Kenneth Hopper was the son of an eminent Scottish professor of chemistry who had been raised on a small farm in Northern Ireland and educated in a one-room schoolhouse through secondary school. The father's talent, however, earned him a scholarship to the Royal Academy of Science in Dublin. Professor Hopper, being Irish, was not allowed to serve in the Army during World War I, so he found employment as a graduate foreman with British Dyestuffs ( later the Imperial Chemical Industries, Ltd.). The nitroglycerine section, where he worked, was known as "the land of the one-legged stools," as plant operators could not be allowed to doze off allowing a vat of new highly explosive liquid to overheat and explode. His father, in addition to his duties at the Royal Technical College, was co-author of a respected text on organic chemistry which is still being used. Professor Hopper also headed the Scottish section for the Society of Chemical Industry. Kenneth recalls many discussions about the chemical industry around the family table, particularly the issues raised about his father's opinion that the Haber labs in Germany were much superior to any British installation. This question of the superior efficacy of various nations' manufactures was thus an early perception of Kenneth Hopper's.

After a short illness, Kenneth Hopper died on 20 May 2019 in his home in Hackettstown. Most of his archives, recording the US influence on Japan's recovery, were donated to the Drucker Institute in California.

== Experiential Research Sources ==
Hopper attended "public" schools in Glasgow, graduating in 1942. During college, he worked one summer as a "production chaser" in the Cathcart Pump works and another in G & J Weir—a young man with a wheelbarrow fetching parts from remote departments, as he describes it. This also gave him the opportunity to visit many areas of the works and observe first-hand the practical problems of major manufacturers. He matriculated at Glasgow University, the premiere British training ground for technology. Upon graduation in 1946, he earned First Class Honours in Mechanical Engineering, Glasgow University.

Pending graduation, he had enlisted in the British Army's Signal Corps Officer Training, but when he reported for duty in 1946, it was time for demobilization of the British Armed Forces after World War II. However, this brief contact with the world of radio electronics stimulated an interest in that field that flowed naturally into his later studies of the Civil Communications Section seminars. These post-war seminars were designed by the American occupation for Japanese electronics manufacturers, as there was a considerable need to keep the Japanese population informed of America's postwar reconstruction efforts there. Mr Hopper also observed that innovations such as radar, penicillin, and the jet engine came from English inventors, but each of these was turned to another nation, often America, for manufacturing. This was blatantly obvious during the war when fleets of merchant vessels had to be employed to bring parts back to Great Britain that could have been made on the island kingdom, a tragic story of submarine warfare that Hopper heard from P&G's principle fitter. Radar's refinement from a non-directional to a directional scanning device, for instance, came from the Bell Laboratories of Summit, New Jersey, USA. So, Hopper entered the manufacturing phase of his career with a keen awareness of the need for understanding how industries evolved innovative practices.

Hopper served a graduate apprenticeship at Metropolitan-Vickers from 1946 to 1948, in Manchester, England, then worked for Procter & Gamble (UK) from 1948 to 1957. There he was engineer in charge on the start-up of P&G's Manchester high pressure hydrolysis unit for making soap and on the start-up of P&G's first Standard Tower Unit for making synthetic detergents outside the US. More to the point, as a P&G engineer he was responsible for applying P&G's long-established Just-in-Time Production Control Method. In 1957, as Head of Mechanical Methods and Planning, he led the first introduction of P&G's advanced participative industrial management methods outside the US. On a 1957 visit to the US, Hopper met Prof. Peter Drucker, who stimulated his interest in the work of the Civil Communications Section during the American Occupation of Japan.

Hopper expanded on those accomplishments at P&G, and from 1957 to 1962, was a consultant with Associated Industrial Consultants (AIC). He helped Irish manufacturers and the Irish Government reorganise to meet Common Market competition in the early years of the Celtic Miracle. • From 1961 to 1962 he represented the Irish Hosiery Manufacturers on the Committee on Industrial Organization (CIO) and was joint author of the CIO 1962 Report on the Irish Hosiery industry.

From 1962 to 1963, he was a member of AIC's Division of Industrial and Human Relations, working with manufacturers in the UK. Mr Hopper returned to general consulting with Belgian and French industry in 1964–65. He worked with both the funeral and wine businesses on the continent.

== Issues and Publications ==
A grant from the Foundation for Management Education allowed Hopper to carry out research on college graduate foremen at the Harvard Business School from 1965 to 1966, some of which was published by the University of Michigan. Entering consulting practice in the US, he provided seminars for Industrial Education International in the US, Canada and the UK and continued publishing articles on the strategy of placing college graduates in strategic manufacturing positions as foremen to get "on the ground" experience . This practice was still rare outside of American industry in the Sixties, and with the rise of a certain business school curriculum that promoted financial management over most other skills, it became rarer even in US industry in subsequent decades. His seminal article, "Can the US Stay Competitive?" raised his profile among industrialists for a time. From 1970 onwards. However, illness restricted Hopper from active consulting but allowed him to pursue research into comparative factory management from his base in New Jersey, and he developed a considerable collection of primary and secondary documents as background for a major publication. This research effort revived the interest of some academic scholars (such as Myron Tribus, emeritus Dean of the Tuck Business School at Dartmouth) in lesser known members of the US Occupation team which sparked the Japanese Miracle after World War II:

• Frank A. Polkinghorn • Charles W. Protzman • Homer M. Sarasohn • Joseph M. Juran and, of course, • W. Edwards Deming

In 1979, with his health much improved, Hopper took his studies to the Japanese, making a five-week tour of Japanese industry, sponsored by Mr. Bunzaemon Inoue, former chairman of the Sumitomo Group. He subsequently publishing several articles about his findings. He continued to publish occasionally while working with his brother, William Hopper, on a major book, The Puritan Gift. Hopper, Kenneth and William Hopper, The Puritan Gift. NY: I.B. Tauris/Macmillan, 2007. He also developed an interest in American colonial history and lectured on various subjects at Waterloo Village, a restored canal museum (now defunct) in western New Jersey. Kenneth also provided a background seminar on sailing ships for NBC news announcers, John Chancellor and David Brinkley, during the 1975 New York Bi-Centennial Tall Ships festival.

In 1994, the brothers organised and contributed to a major seminar on the work of MacArthur’s Civil Communications Section at the Japanese Embassy, London, chaired by Lord Howe, former British Foreign Secretary and attended by manufacturing, governmental and financial leaders from the European Union as well as Asian and East European nations.

Book Reviews: Among the many very positive reviews of The Puritan Gift we note that The London Financial Times called the Hoppers' book "one of the most important business books of the past decade” Stefan Stern, The Financial Times, 22 December 2009 and The Harvard Business Review reviewed it as “This astonishing book about American managerial culture … 'I’ve never read a business book that packed so much information, history, and insight into one compact volume.” Harvard Business Review, January 2010. Senior Editor, Sarah Cliffe
