= 1977 Erie Lackawanna Railway shooting =

Mass shooting in New Jersey, US

- Location where the shooting began in Warren County, New Jersey
- Location: 40°50′29.4″N 74°50′41.7″W; Hackettstown and Mansfield Township, New Jersey, US
- Date: August 26, 1977; 49 years ago c. 5:15 – 9:10 p.m. (EDT; UTC−04:00)
- Attack type: Mass shooting; mass murder; murder–suicide
- Weapons: .44 Magnum Ruger Model 44 semi-automatic rifle; Knife (unused)
- Deaths: 7 (including the perpetrator)
- Injuries: 0
- Perpetrator: Emile Pierre Benoist

On August 26, 1977, a mass shooting occurred along the Erie Lackawanna Railway tracks spanning Hackettstown and Mansfield Township, New Jersey, United States. The perpetrator, 20-year-old Emile Pierre Benoist, shot and killed six people. Following a large-scale police manhunt that lasted for several hours, Benoist committed suicide that evening as authorities surrounded him in a nearby field.

== Shooting ==
On the afternoon of August 26, 1977, Benoist became enraged following a phone call with Allstate Insurance Company regarding an accident claim that had kept his 1972 Oldsmobile Cutlass in a repair shop for five weeks. Frustrated over a low settlement offer and feeling he was getting the "runaround" from his adjuster, an intoxicated Benoist banged his fists on the kitchen table while his mother attempted to reason with him, shouting, "Goddammit, I want my car!" Before leaving, Benoist told her he was going "target shooting." He ran upstairs to grab a knapsack, and at approximately 5:00 p.m., he stormed out the back door with the pack on his back, carrying a knife and an illegally obtained .44-caliber Ruger Model 44 rifle loaded with blunt-nosed magnum bullets, which he had reportedly purchased in town three days prior. His mother tried to stop him but could not, later stating she was afraid to call the police because she thought he would shoot any officer who came near him; instead, she phoned his father, Pierre Benoist, and told him Emile was very upset. He headed across the street and down the tracks, proceeding to set up an ambush along a two-mile stretch of the Erie Lackawanna Railway spanning from Hackettstown into Mansfield Township, New Jersey.

At about 5:15 p.m., police and local residents first received word that someone had been shot along the tracks. The first victim was believed to be 20-year-old Stephen Werner, who was riding his motorcycle along the railroad bed near an abandoned leather tannery. Benoist opened fire from the bushes, fatally shooting Werner through the back of the neck while he was still wearing his motorcycle helmet. Police later determined that although Benoist and Werner had known each other prior to the incident, Benoist did not recognize Werner at the time of the shooting. As Benoist was dragging Werner's body into the bushes, the second victim, 35-year-old Robert Visconti, wandered onto the path to investigate the gunshots. Visconti, a laborer who had been helping clear debris and dismantle the old tannery nearby, was ambushed when Benoist jumped out and shot him at almost point-blank range, killing him with bullet wounds to the chest and face.

The third victim was 14-year-old David Galvin, who was riding a motorized mini-bike along a narrow strip of the railroad right-of-way. His friend of four years, 16-year-old John Joo, was following roughly 20 yards behind on his own bike. Around 5:10 or 5:15 p.m., Joo observed a short-haired man wearing a yellowish-brown windbreaker and blue jeans standing in front of Galvin. When Galvin was only a few yards away, the man raised a long-barreled rifle to his hip and fired several shots. Joo recalled hearing a dull noise and seeing his friend fall; though mortally wounded, Galvin raised his head from the ground and screamed.

Quickly wheeling his bike around, Joo sped back toward Mansfield Township to escape. After fleeing about a hundred yards, Joo looked over his shoulder and saw Benoist chasing him on Galvin's bike, though Benoist no longer appeared to be holding the rifle. Joo managed to outdrive the shooter, escaping the railroad area, and alerted a neighbor who notified the police at 5:36 p.m. When Joo later led officers back to the scene, two boys ran up to the tracks to show police where a body was located; one of the boys was Benoist's younger brother, Mark. Benoist had already dragged the bodies of his first two victims into the brush to hide them. He then got on Werner's motorcycle and eventually drove away, following the tracks southwest into Mansfield Township. When police later arrived at the scene, they found Werner's motorcycle aflame.

Continuing his rampage along the tracks into Mansfield Township, Benoist encountered and killed 27-year-old William Nagle, who had heard the earlier gunfire and went to the tracks to investigate before he was fatally shot. The fifth victim, 19-year-old Jeffrey Gianquitti, was shot between 6:00 and 6:30 p.m. while taking a shortcut along the railway on his trail bike. The final victim, 39-year-old Clifford Sowers, was killed while jogging. In an attempt to cover his tracks, Benoist dragged each body into the surrounding shrubbery. During the incident, two cars were hit by shots from Benoist's rifle. He also fired at a passing motorist but missed, and an arriving police car barely missed being hit, though no one was injured in those instances. Responding officers initially discovered three bodies, and ten minutes later, a ConRail train crew located the remaining three bodies down the line. Later that evening, Pierre Benoist went to the local police station to offer his assistance with the active situation, reportedly telling friends that they needed to find the shooter to protect the public. Shortly after arriving at the station, he was informed by authorities that the sniper they were seeking was his own son.

A search operation involving local police, around 30 state troopers, bloodhounds, and a state police helicopter ensued. Using a high-intensity searchlight, the helicopter traced Benoist from the tracks to a cornfield at around 6:30 p.m. As darkness fell under a full moon, the spotlight illuminated the field while law enforcement surrounded the perimeter. At 9:10 p.m., after a nearly four-hour search, Sergeant John Seabeck, alongside off-duty New Jersey State Police troopers Hugh K. Highet and James P. Smith, spotted a man walking toward them about 50 yards ahead, located approximately 500 yards south of the railroad tracks. The man suddenly jumped into the bushes. Seabeck approached the brush and found Benoist lying on his left side in a slight ditch on the side of the road, partially concealing his weapon under his body. Seabeck aimed the barrel of his shotgun at Benoist's head and stated he was under arrest. Within one or two seconds of the command, Benoist pulled the trigger of the hidden rifle, fatally shooting himself. He was pronounced dead at the scene.

== Victims ==
Six people were killed at the scene. Autopsies performed on the deceased revealed that they had been shot between four and five times in the upper torso or head at fairly close range.

=== Killed ===
- Robert Visconti, 35, of Great Meadows, New Jersey.
- Stephen Werner, 20, of Independence Township, New Jersey.
- David Galvin, 14, of Hackettstown
- William Nagle, 27, of Mansfield
- Jeffrey Gianquitti, 19, of Hackettstown
- Clifford Sowers, 39, of Washington, New Jersey.

== Perpetrator ==
Benoist in 1973

Emile Pierre Benoist (May 24, 1957 – August 26, 1977) was born in Newport, Rhode Island, to Pierre Antoine Benoist and his wife Frances A. Benoist (née Garcia). He was the second oldest of four sons. Benoist grew up in Hackettstown, New Jersey, where his father, Pierre, was a former Golden Gloves boxer and councilman who had run unsuccessfully for mayor the previous year. Following his graduation from Hackettstown High School, he enlisted in the United States Marine Corps on October 10, 1975. Benoist attended basic training at Parris Island in South Carolina but he received an honorable discharge after just 32 days. His father picked him up in Newark, New Jersey, after Benoist complained that instructors had spit on him and that he could not tolerate the treatment, although he claimed he was man enough to endure the military if he had wanted. Following his separation from the military, he obtained a job with the New Jersey Department of Transportation. Like his father, Benoist also took up boxing; fighting as a middleweight, he won his preliminary bouts in the summer 1977 Golden Gloves competition before being eliminated in a later round.

Shortly after his discharge from the military, Benoist began accumulating a police record. On November 29, 1975, he was arrested for destroying private property after breaking a window, resulting in a $25 fine and an order to pay restitution. In February 1976, Benoist was treated at Hackettstown Community Hospital for superficial stab wounds to his stomach. Although he told police he had been jumped by an unknown knife-wielder and refused to provide further details, authorities and local residents theorized the wounds were self-inflicted. On March 2, 1976, he was convicted of impaired driving, and his driver's license was revoked for six months. On May 26, 1976, Benoist applied for a firearms purchasing permit. The Hackettstown Police Department rejected the application, citing his prior arrest record and stating the permit was "not consistent with the public safety and welfare".

Benoist's encounters with law enforcement escalated in late 1976. Following a public drunkenness charge in August that was later dismissed, he was issued multiple traffic summonses on September 6, 1976, for careless driving and driving with a suspended license. Later that same day, he was arrested for attempting to break into a local auction house while armed with two loaded shotguns. The following day, September 7, he voluntarily checked himself into the psychiatric unit of the Lyons Veterans Administration Hospital in Bernards Township, New Jersey. He checked himself out just one day later, complaining about the facility's conditions, and reportedly told a psychiatrist that "someone or something was inside him trying to get out". In October 1976, a municipal court judge fined Benoist $230 and sentenced him to a six-month probationary period for the firearms offenses. The judge also ordered him to undergo psychiatric treatment, but the mandate was withdrawn after Benoist refused to sign a waiver to release his previous medical records. His probation ended in April 1977, during which time he had no further incidents with police.
