= Hackettstown High School =

High school in Warren County, New Jersey, US

Location
- 701 Warren Street; Hackettstown, Warren County, New Jersey 07840; United States; 40.844°N 74.829°W

Information
- Type: Public high school
- Motto: Qui Audet Vincit
- Established: 1883; 143 years ago
- School district: Hackettstown School District
- NCES School ID: 340630005814
- Principal: Kyle S. Sosnovik
- Faculty: 74.0 FTEs
- Grades: 9-12
- Enrollment: 868 (as of 2024–25)
- Student to teacher ratio: 11.7:1
- Campus type: Suburb: Large
- Colors: Orange and Black
- Athletics conference: Northwest Jersey Athletic Conference (general); North Jersey Super Football Conference (football)
- Team name: Tigers
- Newspaper: Tiger Times
- Yearbook: Oracle
- Website: hhs.hackettstown.org

Hackettstown High School is a four-year comprehensive public high school that serves students in ninth through twelfth grades from Hackettstown in Warren County, in the U.S. state of New Jersey, operating as the lone secondary school of the Hackettstown School District. Hackettstown High School serves students from Hackettstown, along with those from the townships of Allamuchy, Independence and Liberty, who attend as part of sending/receiving relationships.

As of the 2024–25 school year, the school had an enrollment of 868 students and 74.0 classroom teachers (on an FTE basis), for a student–teacher ratio of 11.7:1. There were 211 students (24.3% of enrollment) eligible for free lunch and 50 (5.8% of students) eligible for reduced-cost lunch.

== History ==
The first class of eight girls and three boys graduated in 1882 or 1883. The school's first principal was E.K. Richardson. The first football game in school history was played in 1898.

On August 26, 1977, a 14-year-old school football player was one of six people killed in a mass shooting event nearby.

On March 26, 2013, a 20-year-old South Korean man living in Seoul triggered a lockdown at the school by making a hoax call to the Warren County 9-1-1 center threatening to use an AK-47 to shoot up the school. Officials claimed that he was upset that a long-distance relationship with a female student had broken up.

== Awards, recognition and rankings ==
The school was the 211th-ranked public high school in New Jersey out of 339 schools statewide in New Jersey Monthly magazine's September 2014 cover story on the state's "Top Public High Schools", using a new ranking methodology. The school had been ranked 216th in the state of 328 schools in 2012, after being ranked 191st in 2010 out of 322 schools listed. The magazine ranked the school 236th in 2008 out of 316 schools. The school was ranked 215th in the magazine's September 2006 issue, which surveyed 316 schools across the state. Schooldigger.com ranked the school tied for 97th out of 381 public high schools statewide in its 2011 rankings (an increase of 73 positions from the 2010 ranking) which were based on the combined percentage of students classified as proficient or above proficient on the mathematics (85.8%) and language arts literacy (97.6%) components of the High School Proficiency Assessment (HSPA).

== Athletics ==
The Hackettstown High School Tigers compete in the Northwest Jersey Athletic Conference which is comprised of public and private high school in Morris, Sussex and Warren counties, having been established in the 2009-10 school year as a result of the realignment of conferences in Northern New Jersey by the New Jersey State Interscholastic Athletic Association (NJSIAA). With 656 students in grades 10-12, the school was classified by the NJSIAA for the 2019–20 school year as Group II for most athletic competition purposes, which included schools with an enrollment of 486 to 758 students in that grade range. The football team competes in the American White division of the North Jersey Super Football Conference, which includes 112 schools competing in 20 divisions, making it the nation's biggest football-only high school sports league. The school was classified by the NJSIAA as Group II North for football for 2024–2026, which included schools with 484 to 683 students. The school competes in interscholastic football, golf, soccer, cheerleading, volleyball, marching band, cross country, basketball, wrestling, fencing, baseball, softball, field hockey, lacrosse and track.

Together with Hopatcong High School, the school participates in a joint cooperative ice hockey team with Mount Olive High School as the host school / lead agency. The program operates under agreements scheduled to expire at the end of the 2023–24 school year.

The girls spring track team was the Group II state champion in 1976.

The 1981 football team finished the season with an 8-2-1 record after winning the North II Group II state sectional title with a 7-6 win against Jonathan Dayton High School in the championship game after a failed extra point that would have tied the game. Through 2020, the team has played in two sectional finals and made it into the playoffs in 15 seasons.

The boys' soccer team won the Group III state championship in 2001 (defeating Hopewell Valley Central High School in the tournament final) and the Group II title in 2014 (vs. Cinnaminson High School). The 2001 team finished the season with a 18-6-2 record after winning the Group III title with a 2-0 victory in the championship game played at The College of New Jersey. In 2014, the boys' varsity soccer team finished the season with a record of 23-1-1. They entered the state tournament with a record of 17-1 and were a three seed. In the North II Group II sectional final, Hackettstown beat Garfield High School by a score of 2-1, capturing the North II Group II title. They then went on to play Ramsey High School where they were tied 1-1 after regulation and two overtimes; In penalty kicks, Hackettstown won by a score of 4-1. In the Group II tournament finals, Hackettstown beat Cinnaminson High School by a score of 3-1 at Kean University, earning the team's first championship since winning the Group III state championship in 2001 and capping a season in which the team broke a total of 8 school records including most goals scored in a season (27), most shutouts posted (8) and fewest losses (1).

The wrestling team won the North II Group II state sectional championships in 2006 and 2007. The team won the 2007 Skyland Conference Raritan Division championships, the team's first ever conference crown, and went on to win the North II, Group II state sectional championship with a score of 54-6 against West Morris Mendham High School in the tournament final.

The baseball team won the 2007 North II, Group II state sectional championship, for the first time in 20 years, with a 5-4 win over Cliffside Park High School. The Tigers won the Skyland Raritan Conference title in 2009; their first Skyland title in 20 years. They won the Northwest Jersey Athletic Conference title in 2010.

In 2010, the girls' soccer team ended the season with a 17-8 record and winning the North II Group II state sectional championship. The championship game was won with 28.6 seconds remaining in the game and was the school's first NJAC Freedom Division championship. For their accomplishment the New Jersey Herald recognized the team as their 2010 Girls' Soccer Team of the Year.

== Administration ==
The school's principal is Kyle S. Sosnovik. His core administration team includes three assistant principals and the athletic director.

== Notable alumni ==
- John D. Bulkeley (1911–1996), Medal of Honor recipient and United States Navy vice admiral
- John DiMaio (born 1955), member of the New Jersey General Assembly who has represented the 23rd Legislative District since 2009 and has served as Minority Leader since 2022
- Brian Fallon (born 1980), guitarist and lead vocalist for The Gaslight Anthem
- CJ Fraleigh (born 1963), food-industry executive
- Edwin Kaprat (1964–1995), serial killer, rapist, and arsonist who committed six murders in Tampa and Hernando County, Florida from 1991 to 1993, with a majority of his victims being elderly women
- Cole Kimball (born 1985), pitcher for the Washington Nationals
- Jimmi Simpson (born 1975), actor known for Westworld, House of Cards, Zodiac, Breakout Kings, Black Mirror and It's Always Sunny in Philadelphia
- Brandon Sklenar (born 1990, class of 2008), actor best known for his roles in the films Mapplethorpe, Vice, Midway and It Ends with Us
