= Shearer's Foods =

Snack product manufacturer

Shearer's Foods, LLC

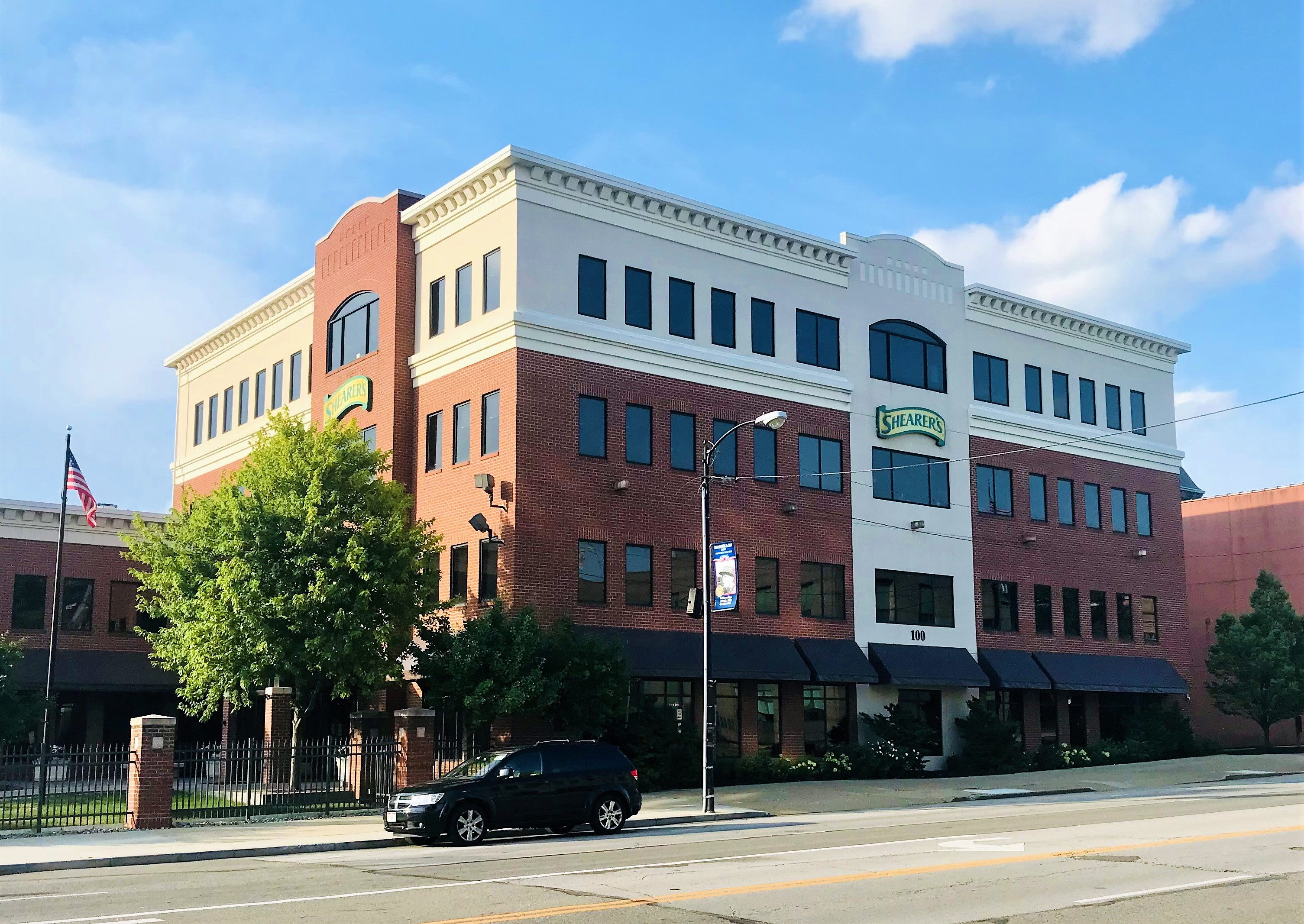
- Type: Private company
- Industry: Snack food
- Founded: 1974; 52 years ago
- Headquarters: Massillon, Ohio, United States
- Area served: United States; Canada minimal global distribution
- Key people: Bill Nictakis CEO
- Products: List of products
- Owner: Independent; (1974–2015); Ontario Teachers' Pension Plan; (2015–23); Clayton Dubilier & Rice; (2023–present)
- Website: www.shearers.com

Shearer's Foods, LLC is a U.S. manufacturer and distributor of snack foods owned by Clayton, Dubilier & Rice, LLC (CD&R), a U.S. private equity company. Founded in 1974 by Walsh College alumnus Jack Shearer as Shearer's Snacks, it was sold in 2012 but continues to be headquartered in Massillon, Ohio.

With more than 5,000 employees across eight facilities, since 2021 the company manufactures, warehouses, and distributes \ private label products only for other snack food companies and retailers. Shearer's Foods discontinued production of its own Shearer's brand snacks, in favor of private label and contract snack manufacturing.

Shearer's now has factories in Ohio, Texas, Arkansas, Oregon, Virginia, Iowa, Minnesota and Ontario, with worldwide distribution. Its plant in Massillon is the first food manufacturing plant in the world to achieve LEED platinum certification.

In December 2023, Clayton Dubilier & Rice completed the acquisition of the company.

== History ==
In the early 1900s, the Shearer family opened Shearer's Market in Canton, Ohio. The third generation, Jack Shearer and his wife, Rosemary, operated the family grocery store from the 1950s until 1976, and in 1974 bought a snack food distributorship and named it Brookside Distributing. In 1979, they began manufacturing "hand-cooked" potato chips until discovering that a kettle cooked chip provided more of a crunch and a standardized method of preparation. The Shearers hand-cooked potato chips from the kettle, packaged them in one-pound poly bags with a twist tie, delivered them from a warehouse and first sold them under the Kettle-Cook'd label.

=== Growth and transition ===
In 1982, Shearer's purchased a 20,000 square foot facility on ten acres in Brewster, Ohio. Soon after, six hand-kettles and a peanut roaster were in operation. The Grandma Shearer's logo appeared on shelves in 1983, and 3,700 pounds of potatoes were processed daily. Shearer's installed its first continuous fryer to produce up to 1,000 pounds of potato chips every hour and expanded its warehouse and maintenance space by 9,000 square feet in 1986.

In 1988, the company increased its plant size again. This growth continued through the 1990s and included the addition of a second continuous fryer, two hand-kettle fryers that featured automatic stirring systems (among the first manufactured in all of the United States), computerized combination weighers, state-of-the-snack equipment for tortilla chips and cheese curls, and an additional 100,000 square feet of space.

In the early 2000s, six hand-kettle cookers, a new potato peeling system, distribution and transfer conveyors, and a new seasoning system were installed. Thirty-three acres adjacent to the current location were purchased to combine for 77 acres in total, while a portion of the storage operation was relocated nine miles from the headquarters to Massillon. The company was named "Snack Manufacturer of the Year" by Snack Food & Wholesale Bakery magazine in 2002 and again in 2011.

Shearer's developed a new logo, revamped packaging, and expanded its factory outlet store in 2004. A $2.6 million wastewater treatment plant was completed in the spring, and six additional hand-kettle cookers were installed along with a new packaging area, making Shearer's one of the largest manufacturers of kettle-cooked potato chips in the nation.

=== Recent history ===
An increasing trend of whole grains and better-for-you snacks resulted in three new whole grain tortilla chip products with 100% whole grain yellow corn in 2006.

- 2008: unveiled plans to build the first manufacturing plant in the world to achieve the highest sustainability award for environmental responsibility
- 2009: introduced two multi-SKU brands to retail, Tangos™ Tortilla Chips and Shapers™ Whole Grain Chips
- 2010: acquired Snack Alliance, Inc. and its Canadian affiliate (collectively, “Snack Alliance”), a branded, contract pack and private label snack producer in North America (Founded in 2000, Snack Alliance employed over 400 associates across the United States and Canada. Snack Alliance had manufacturing operations located in Hermiston, Oregon and Bristol, Virginia that produced potato chips, tortilla chips, extruded products, popcorn, and their Riceworks brand of whole grain rice snacks.)
- May 2011: extended its line of potato chips to include zero trans fat chips, cooked in 100% canola oil
- June 2012: moved its headquarters into the four story Grand Mill Centre building in downtown Massillon, Ohio
- October 2012: was sold to Chicago-based Wind Point Partners.
- January 2015: majority stake was acquired by Ontario Teacher's Pension Plan through the purchase of additional equity stake (The private equity group had initially acquired stake in the company in 2012 alongside Wind Point Partners and in partnership with CJ Fralaigh. Since the sale in 2012, Shearer's completed acquisitions of Lance Private Brands and Medallion Foods. These acquisitions doubled the size of the business and significantly expanded private label and contract manufacturing offerings.)
- 2016: acquired Barrel O' Fun, a division of KLN Family Brands located in Perham, Minnesota (The Barrel O' Fun brand includes many of the same snack items that Shearer's already produced. Shearer's now operates the Barrel O' Fun manufacturing plant and warehouse under their name and are not associated with KLN, although they share the same property. The Perham plant continues to manufacture the Barrel O' Fun brand of snacks, but now produces private label brands as well.)
- 2021: Shearer's Foods discontinued production of its own Shearer's brand snacks, in favor of private label and contract snack manufacturing.

== Environmental sustainability ==
The company has expressed a commitment to sustainability and energy performance, joining Energy Star in 2006 and working to improve energy performance in its offices, manufacturing facilities and distribution centers. The company received recognition by way of a Crain's Cleveland Business Emerald Award for its efforts.

Their energy management program includes:

- A zero waste program that calls for all facilities to send less than one percent of waste to landfills
- Recycling finished goods and wet waste for use as animal feed
- Reclamation of all potato starch for refinement as industrial lubricant
- Recycling of all used vegetable oil
- Conversion to high efficiency T8 & T5 lighting in Brewster and Lubbock manufacturing sites, and in Navarre Distribution warehouse areas
- New oil filtration equipment to increase oil quality and eliminate rendering of oil
- Economizers on large air handling units to greatly reduce natural gas consumption during heating season
- Wastewater management facilities that comply with state Environmental Protection Agency requirements

The company broke ground on its LEED Platinum Certified snack food manufacturing plant in 2009. The plant in Massillon, Ohio was the first manufacturing plant in the world to achieve the highest sustainability award for environmental responsibility.

== Manufacturing ==
=== Manufacturing capabilities ===
Shearer's various products are made from potatoes, yellow, white, blue, and organic corn, and for tortilla chips, company-produced masa. Seasonings and flavors are developed by an in-house R&D group and also in conjunction with external partners. Production capabilities include:

- hand kettles for production of kettle cooked potato chips
- continuous potato chip lines for standard, wavy and rippled chip production
- tortilla chip lines
- extruders for production of curl and puff product
- twin screw extrusion production

Products include sliced, rippled, and wavy potato chips, kettle-cooked potato chips, tortilla and whole grain extruded chips, and other extruded products such as cheese curls and puff corn (also known as hulless popcorn).

The company maintains six distribution centers in Ohio and Pennsylvania, and operates its own distribution routes, while also relying on a network of select distributors throughout the midwestern United States, New England, and parts of Canada.

=== Plants ===
- Massillon, Ohio: Headquarters; LEED manufacturing plant
- Brewster, Ohio: main manufacturing plant
- Bristol, Virginia: manufacturing plant
- Burlington, Iowa: manufacturing plant
- Fort Worth, Texas: manufacturing plant
- Guelph, Ontario: manufacturing plant
- Hermiston, Oregon: manufacturing plant (Former location. Boiler explosion destroyed plant in early 2022.)
- Lubbock, Texas: co-pack manufacturing plant
- Newport, Arkansas: manufacturing plant
- Phoenix, Arizona: manufacturing plant
- Perham, Minnesota: manufacturing plant
- Waterford, Pennsylvania: manufacturing plant

== Products ==
Shearer's Branded Snacks

- Kettle Cooked Potato Chips in flavors Original, Mesquite BBQ, Sea Salt and Pepper, Sea Salt and Vinegar, Hot Pepper Jalapeño and 40% Less Fat
- Home-Style Potato Chips in Classic, Bacon-Cheddar and Rippled
- Rippled Potato Chips in flavors in Original, Sour Cream and Onion, Home Run Hot Dog (seasonal)
- Savory Potato Chips in Original, Sour Cream & Onion, Lightly Salted, Cheddar & Sour Cream and Barbeque
- Baked Cheese Curls and Krazi Curls
- Butter Puffs and Cheese Puffs
- Pretzels in Thins, Minis, Sticks and flavors Honey Wheat and Butter Twist
- Pork Rinds in flavors Original and Barbecue
- Tortilla chips in Multigrain & Flaxseed, Fire Roasted Veggie, Blue Corn & Sesame, Deli Rounds, Bite Size, Cantina Style, Margarita Lime and Restaurant Style

Other Shearer's brands include riceworks, Granny Goose, Thin & Crispy, Brent & Sam's, Delicious Bakery, and Vista.
