= Hackettstown, New Jersey =

Town in Warren County, New Jersey, US

- Town
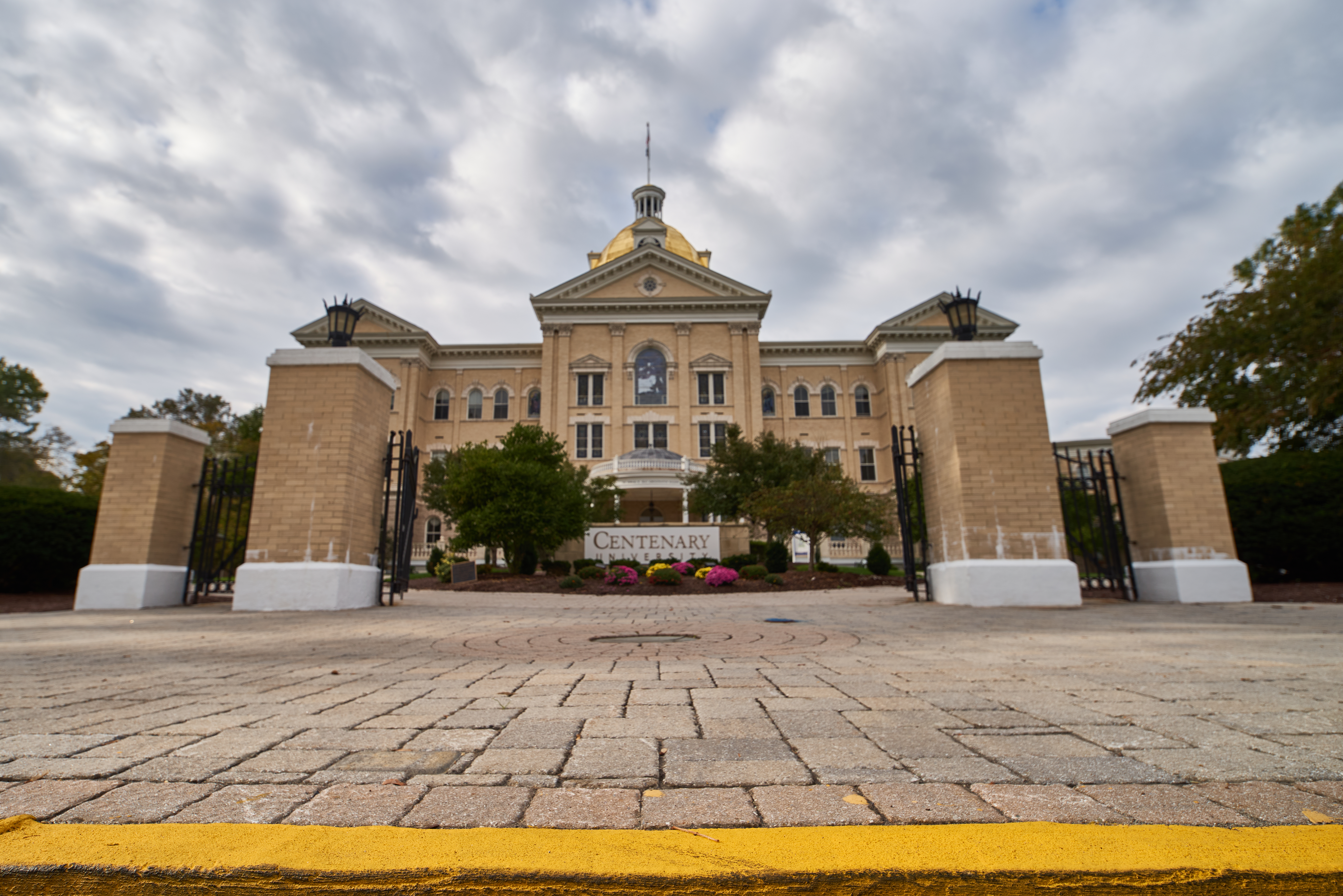
- Centenary University, Warren County’s only four year post secondary institution

- Seal

- Location in Warren County Location in New Jersey Location in the United States
- Coordinates: 40.853704°N 74.824877°W
- Country: United States
- State: New Jersey
- County: Warren
- Incorporated: March 9, 1853
- Named for: Samuel Hackett

Government
  - Type: Special charter
  - Body: Town Council
  - Mayor: Jerry DiMaio (R)
  - Administrator / Municipal clerk: P.J. Reilly

Area
  - Total: 3.71 sq mi (9.61 km^{2})
  - Land: 3.61 sq mi (9.35 km^{2})
  - Water: 0.10 sq mi (0.26 km^{2}) 2.67%
  - Rank: 307th of 565 in state 18th of 22 in county
- Elevation: 554 ft (169 m)

Population (2020)
  - Total: 10,248
  - Estimate (2023): 10,125
  - Rank: 239th of 565 in state 2nd of 22 in county
  - Density: 2,837.2/sq mi (1,095.4/km^{2})
  - Rank: 230th of 565 in state 3rd of 22 in county
- Time zone: UTC−05:00 (Eastern (EST))
  - Summer (DST): UTC−04:00 (Eastern (EDT))
- ZIP Code: 07840
- Area code: 908
- FIPS code: 3404128710
- GNIS feature ID: 0885237
- Website: www.hackettstown.net

Hackettstown is a town in Warren County, in the U.S. state of New Jersey. It is perhaps best known as the home to the US headquarters of Mars, Inc. As of the 2020 United States census, the town's population was 10,248, an increase of 524 (+5.4%) from the 2010 census count of 9,724, which in turn reflected a decline of 679 (−6.5%) from the 10,403 counted in the 2000 census.

Hackettstown was incorporated as a town by an act of the New Jersey Legislature on March 9, 1853, from portions of Independence Township. Portions of territory were exchanged with Mansfield Township in 1857, 1860, 1872 and 1875.

== History ==
=== Founding ===
William Johnson (1817–1891) was a prime contributor to the incorporation of the town in 1853. He and his brother George (1815–1889) were successful merchants in the town beginning in 1839 when they began operating the W.L. & G.W Johnson dry good store. The two men were very active in community affairs. George was a member of First Presbyterian Church, a director of the Hackettstown National Bank, and a member of the Hackettstown Water Board. Both men were involved in the establishment of the Union Cemetery.

Hackettstown was named after Samuel Hackett, an early settler and large landowner. Hackett is said to have "contributed liberally to the liquid refreshments on the christening of a new hotel, in order to secure the name which, before this, had been Helms' Mills or Musconetcong."

=== Tillie Smith murder case ===
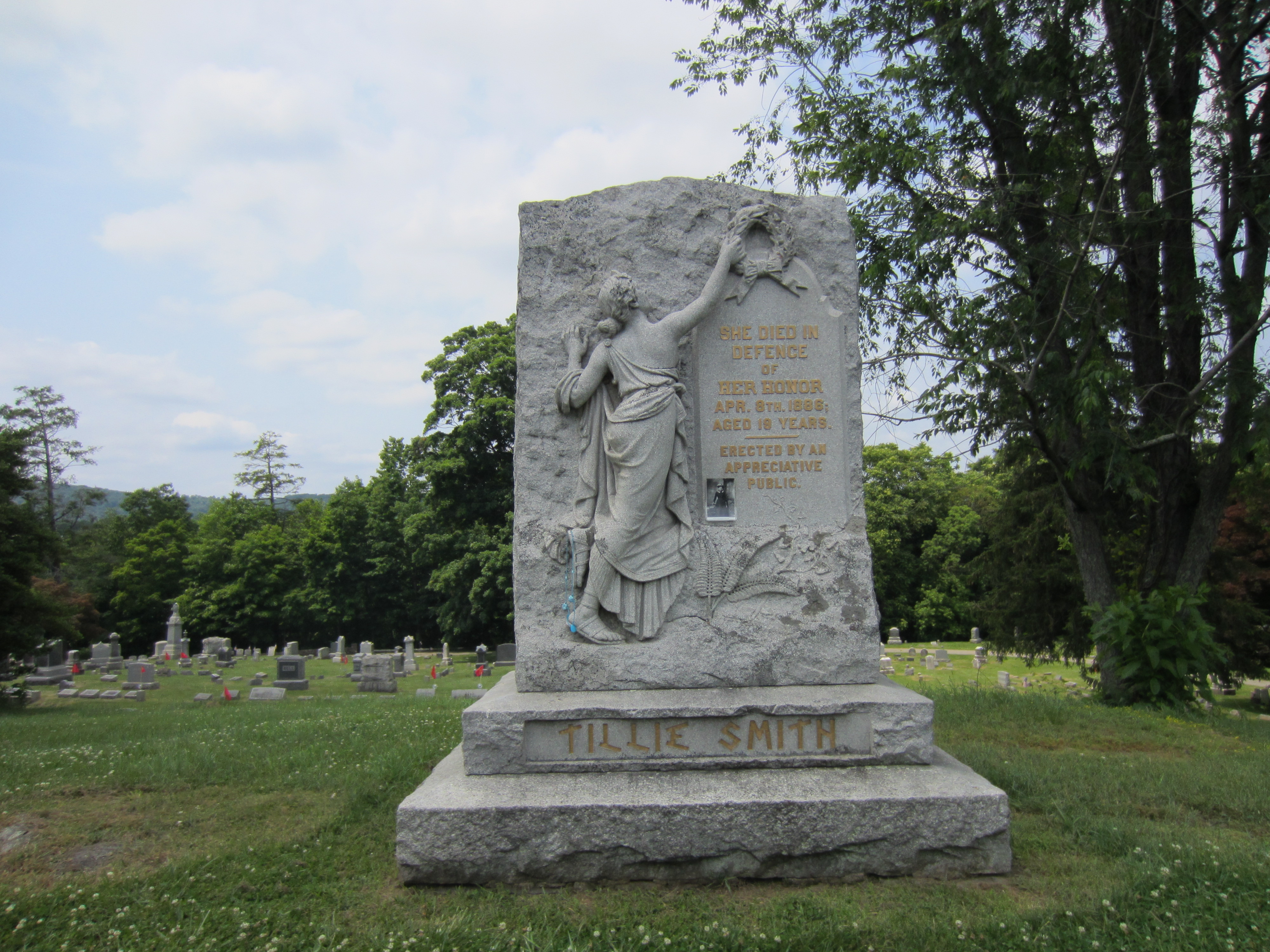
The Tillie Smith monument to chastity, She Died In Defence of Her Honor, April 8, 1886

In 1886, Tillie Smith, a 19-year-old kitchen worker from a poverty-stricken family, was raped, murdered and left lying in an open field near the campus of the Centenary Collegiate Institute, where she worked. James Titus, a janitor at the school, was tried and convicted of the rape and murder, based on circumstantial evidence and public opinion shaped by yellow journalism. Titus was sentenced to hang, but he signed a confession to avoid the death penalty and served 19 years of hard labor. He lived from 1904 to 1952 in Hackettstown among many of the same residents who championed his conviction, the validity of which remains controversial. The killing is a perennial urban legend in town, inspiring multiple books, Weird NJ magazine articles, theatrical performances and dark tourism ghost tours.

=== 20th century ===
The Hackettstown State Fish Hatchery, a popular tourist destination, was established in 1912.

In 1925, a train wreck just outside of town killed about 50 people and injured about 50 others en route to Hoboken, New Jersey, from Chicago. The derailment involved a Lackawanna Railroad train and occurred at the Hazen Road grade crossing near Rockport Road at approximately 3:30 am, as a result of debris washed downhill by a storm fouling the road crossing. The event made national headlines and stands as the deadliest event in Warren County history.

Fund-raising campaigns for a new hospital started as early as 1945, supported and organized by local civic and business groups including Kiwanis, Unico International, PTA and others, a large donation by the Seventh Day Adventists and a grant from the United States Public Health Service, the 106-bed Hackettstown Community Hospital was established in 1973.

In 1977, a mass shooting occurred in the town when Emile Pierre Benoist, a 20-year-old graduate of Hackettstown High School and former U.S. Marine, took random shots at passing cars over the course of about four hours and shot and killed six people before turning the rifle on himself.

In 1994, a charity BBQ picnic organized by the "Tri-County Motorcycle Club" at the Elk's Lodge in Hackettstown was crashed by rival members of the outlaw Pagan's Motorcycle Club. "An altercation started that escalated into knives and guns being used", according to the Warren County Prosecutor. Two Pagans were killed and three other bikers were injured.

=== 21st century ===
Hackettstown was named #72 of the top 100 towns in the United States to Live and Work In by Money Magazine in 2005; it has not been included since.

In 2011, the town council proclaimed a sister city relationship with Hacketstown, Ireland.

== Geography ==
According to the United States Census Bureau, the town had a total area of 3.71 square miles (9.61 km^{2}), including 3.61 square miles (9.35 km^{2}) of land and 0.10 square miles (0.26 km^{2}) of water (2.67%) as of 2019. The town is located in a valley along the banks of the Musconetcong River.

Upper Pohatcong Mountain extends northeast of Washington approximately 6 mi (9.7 km).

Unincorporated communities, localities and place names located partially or completely within the town include Warren Furnace.

Hackettstown borders the townships of Washington (Morris County) to the southeast, Mansfield to the southwest, Allamuchy to the north, Mount Olive to the northeast, and Independence to the west.

Hackettstown is 49.6 miles (79.8 km) northeast of Allentown and 55.3 miles (89.0 km) northwest of New York City.

== Climate ==
Climate data for Hackettstown, New Jersey, 40.8537°N 74.8249°W, Elevation: 554 ft (169 m)
Month	Jan	Feb	Mar	Apr	May	Jun	Jul	Aug	Sep	Oct	Nov	Dec	Year
Mean daily maximum °F (°C)	36.4 (2.4)	39.3 (4.1)	47.6 (8.7)	60.4 (15.8)	70.4 (21.3)	78.2 (25.7)	82.9 (28.3)	81.1 (27.3)	74.9 (23.8)	63.3 (17.4)	51.9 (11.1)	41.5 (5.3)	60.7 (15.9)
Daily mean °F (°C)	27.6 (−2.4)	29.6 (−1.3)	37.5 (3.1)	49.1 (9.5)	59.3 (15.2)	67.7 (19.8)	72.4 (22.4)	70.7 (21.5)	63.9 (17.7)	52.3 (11.3)	41.9 (5.5)	33.1 (0.6)	50.4 (10.2)
Mean daily minimum °F (°C)	18.7 (−7.4)	19.8 (−6.8)	27.5 (−2.5)	37.8 (3.2)	48.2 (9.0)	57.2 (14.0)	62.0 (16.7)	60.3 (15.7)	52.8 (11.6)	41.4 (5.2)	31.8 (−0.1)	24.7 (−4.1)	40.2 (4.5)
Average precipitation inches (mm)	3.68 (93)	2.94 (75)	4.13 (105)	4.02 (102)	4.17 (106)	4.84 (123)	4.76 (121)	4.79 (122)	4.70 (119)	4.79 (122)	3.54 (90)	4.52 (115)	50.88 (1,293)
Source: PRISM (spatially interpolated, 1991-2020 normals)

== Demographics ==
Historical population
Census	Pop.	Note	%±
1860	1,322		—
1870	2,202		66.6%
1880	2,502		13.6%
1890	2,417		−3.4%
1900	2,474		2.4%
1910	2,715		9.7%
1920	2,936		8.1%
1930	3,038		3.5%
1940	3,289		8.3%
1950	3,894		18.4%
1960	5,276		35.5%
1970	9,472		79.5%
1980	8,850		−6.6%
1990	8,120		−8.2%
2000	10,403		28.1%
2010	9,724		−6.5%
2020	10,248		5.4%
2023 (est.)	10,125	▼	−1.2%
Population sources: 1860–1920 1860–1870 1870; 1880–1890 1890–1910; 1910–1930 1940–2000; 2000 2010 2020

=== 2020 census ===
As of the 2020 census, Hackettstown had a population of 10,248. The median age was 39.3 years. 20.7% of residents were under the age of 18 and 17.6% of residents were 65 years of age or older. For every 100 females there were 90.8 males, and for every 100 females age 18 and over there were 89.3 males age 18 and over.

99.8% of residents lived in urban areas, while 0.2% lived in rural areas.

There were 3,769 households in Hackettstown, of which 30.6% had children under the age of 18 living in them. Of all households, 48.5% were married-couple households, 17.6% were households with a male householder and no spouse or partner present, and 27.3% were households with a female householder and no spouse or partner present. About 29.7% of all households were made up of individuals and 14.5% had someone living alone who was 65 years of age or older.

There were 3,945 housing units, of which 4.5% were vacant. The homeowner vacancy rate was 0.8% and the rental vacancy rate was 2.8%.

Racial composition as of the 2020 census
Race	Number	Percent
White	7,130	69.6%
Black or African American	370	3.6%
American Indian and Alaska Native	33	0.3%
Asian	409	4.0%
Native Hawaiian and Other Pacific Islander	1	0.0%
Some other race	1,198	11.7%
Two or more races	1,107	10.8%
Hispanic or Latino (of any race)	2,393	23.4%

=== 2010 census ===
The 2010 United States census counted 9,724 people, 3,575 households, and 2,256 families in the town. The population density was 2,696.1 per square mile (1,041.0/km^{2}). There were 3,755 housing units at an average density of 1,041.1 per square mile (402.0/km^{2}). The racial makeup was 85.08% (8,273) White, 2.46% (239) Black or African American, 0.24% (23) Native American, 4.97% (483) Asian, 0.05% (5) Pacific Islander, 5.19% (505) from other races, and 2.02% (196) from two or more races. Hispanic or Latino of any race were 15.16% (1,474) of the population.

Of the 3,575 households, 29.4% had children under the age of 18; 49.5% were married couples living together; 8.6% had a female householder with no husband present and 36.9% were non-families. Of all households, 30.0% were made up of individuals and 12.3% had someone living alone who was 65 years of age or older. The average household size was 2.48 and the average family size was 3.09.

20.3% of the population were under the age of 18, 14.5% from 18 to 24, 25.5% from 25 to 44, 25.5% from 45 to 64, and 14.1% who were 65 years of age or older. The median age was 37.3 years. For every 100 females, the population had 91.8 males. For every 100 females ages 18 and older there were 91.4 males.

The Census Bureau's 2006–2010 American Community Survey showed that (in 2010 inflation-adjusted dollars) median household income was $62,215 (with a margin of error of +/− $6,907) and the median family income was $82,216 (+/− $10,611). Males had a median income of $51,489 (+/− $5,850) versus $41,822 (+/− $5,248) for females. The per capita income for the borough was $29,433 (+/− $2,122). About 4.4% of families and 7.7% of the population were below the poverty line, including 11.4% of those under age 18 and 6.4% of those age 65 or over.

=== 2000 census ===
As of the 2000 United States census there were 10,403 people, 4,134 households, and 2,530 families residing in the town. The population density was 2,809.5 inhabitants per square mile (1,084.8/km^{2}). There were 4,347 housing units at an average density of 1,174.0 per square mile (453.3/km^{2}). The racial makeup of the town was 90.25% White, 2.18% African American, 0.12% Native American, 2.91% Asian, 0.06% Pacific Islander, 2.00% from other races, and 2.47% from two or more races. Hispanic or Latino of any race were 8.01% of the population.

There were 4,134 households, out of which 30.2% had children under the age of 18 living with them, 48.0% were married couples living together, 9.3% had a female householder with no husband present, and 38.8% were non-families. 31.7% of all households were made up of individuals, and 11.0% had someone living alone who was 65 years of age or older. The average household size was 2.41 and the average family size was 3.10.

In the town, the population was spread out, with 22.7% under the age of 18, 10.0% from 18 to 24, 33.9% from 25 to 44, 21.2% from 45 to 64, and 12.2% who were 65 years of age or older. The median age was 35 years. For every 100 females, there were 92.8 males. For every 100 females age 18 and over, there were 89.6 males.

The median income for a household in the town was $51,955, and the median income for a family was $64,383. Males had a median income of $44,420 versus $31,110 for females. The per capita income for the town was $24,742. About 2.3% of families and 4.8% of the population were below the poverty line, including 4.9% of those under age 18 and 7.1% of those age 65 or over.

== Economy ==
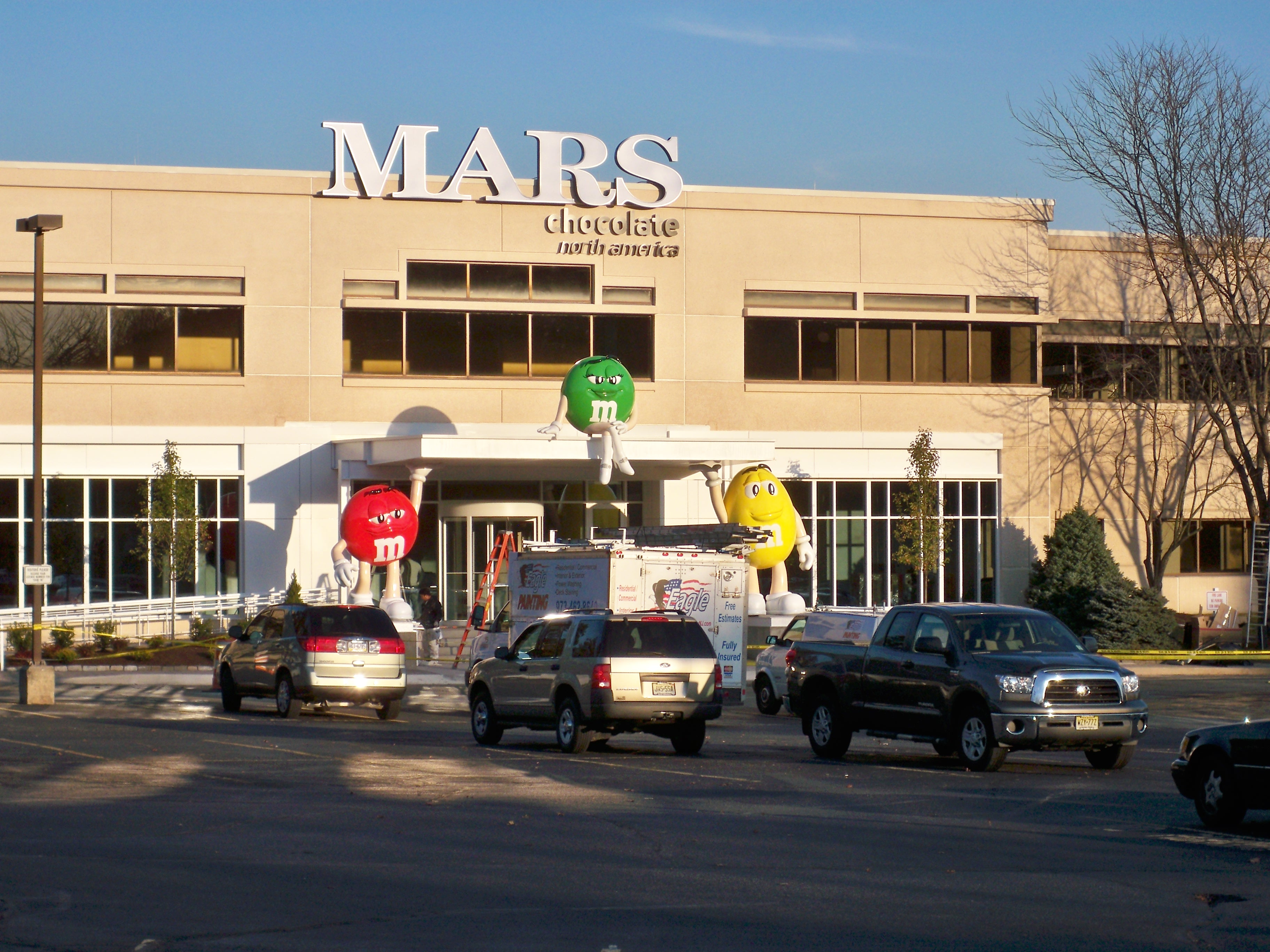
Mars Wrigley US Headquarters, 800 High Street

Hackettstown houses the US headquarters of Mars Wrigley Confectionery, a business segment of Mars, Incorporated, makers of Milky Way, Mars, M&M's, Twix and Snickers.

== Arts and culture ==
Musical groups from Hackettstown include The Semonski Sisters, a family musical act that appeared on television's The Lawrence Welk Show from 1975 to 1977.

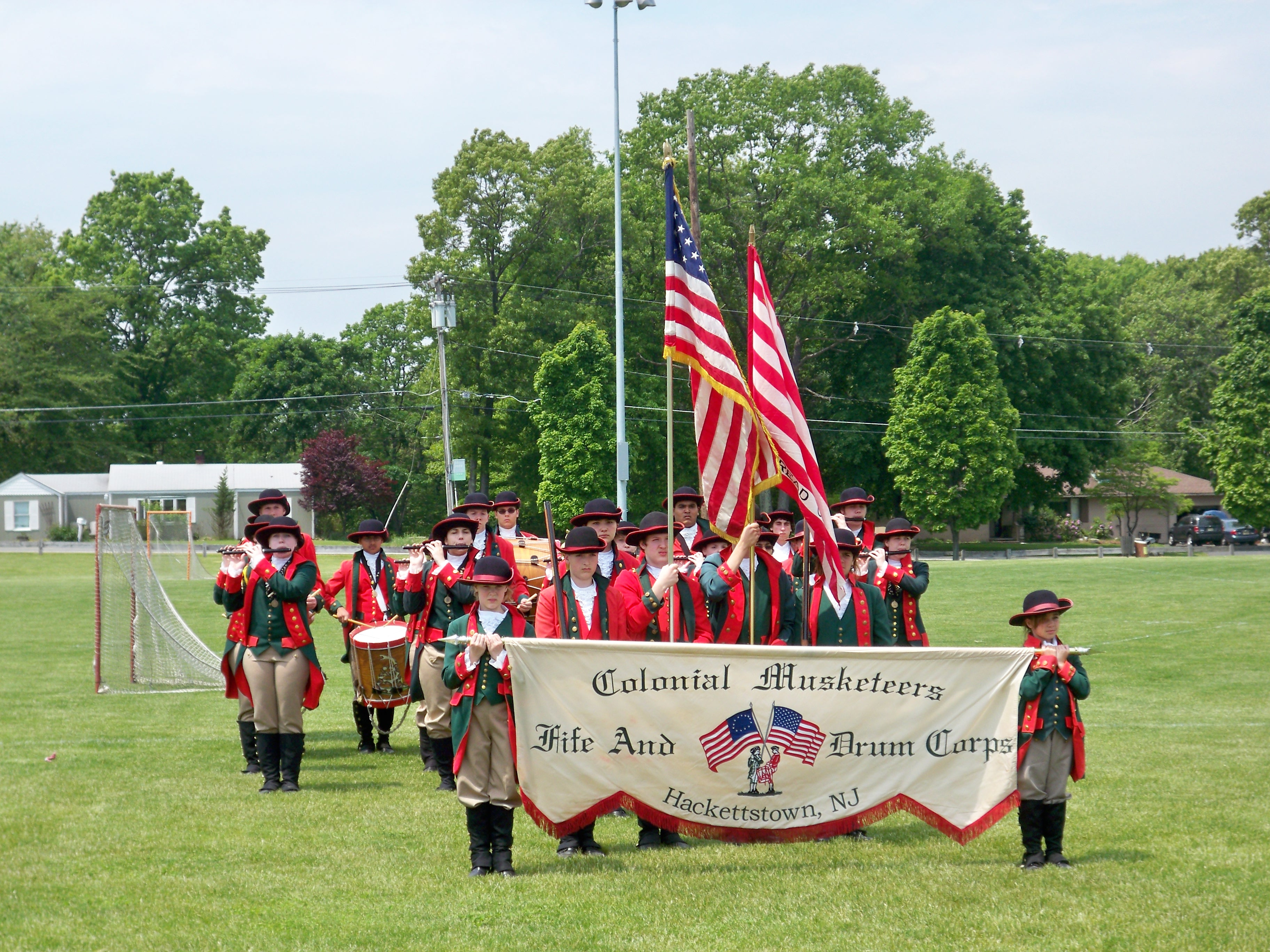
Colonial Musketeers

The "Colonial Musketeers" Junior Fife & Drum Corps has been marching in parades and ceremonies around the region since 1975. An adult version of the group began operating in 2000.

== Sports ==
- The Skyland Rollergirls were a roller derby team founded in 2008 that bouted out of Excel Roller Skating Center in Hackettstown until it closed in late 2011.
- The Jersey Express, a team in the American Basketball Association moved to Hackettstown in late 2012 and played in the gym at Centenary College.
- Hackettstown High School sports teams are known as the Tigers and compete as part of the Northwest Jersey Athletic Conference.
- The Centenary University sports teams are known as the Cyclones.
- The Hackettstown Harleys ice hockey team was founded in 2008.

== Government ==
=== Local government ===
Hackettstown operates under a mayor-council form of government that was created by a special charter adopted by the New Jersey Legislature and approved by the voters in 1970. The town is one of 11 municipalities (of the 564) statewide that operate under a special charter. The town's governing body is comprised of a strong mayor who serves a three-year term of office and six councilpersons who are elected at large to three-year terms of office on a staggered basis, with two seats up for election each year. The mayor is the town's chief executive officer, overseeing its day-to-day operation and presenting an annual budget. The council is the town's legislative body. The mayor attends town council meetings, but may only vote in the event of a tie. The mayor may veto ordinances passed by the council, which can be overridden with the votes of four council members.

As of 2022, the mayor of Hackettstown is Republican Gerald DiMaio Jr. whose term of office ends December 31, 2023. Members of the Town Council are Jody Becker (R, 2024), Matthew Engelau (R, 2022), Leonard Kunz (R, 2023), James Lambo (R, 2022; elected to serve an unexpired term), Scott Sheldon (R, 2024) and Eric Tynan (R, 2023).

James Lambo was selected from a list of three candidates nominated by the Republican municipal committee to fill a vacant seat. The seat, which expired in December 2018, was vacated by William Conforti in August 2016, after his announcement that he was moving out of the municipality. Lambo served on an interim basis until the November 2016 general election during which he was elected to serve the balance of the term of office.

=== Federal, state, and county representation ===
Hackettstown is located in the 7th congressional district and is part of the 23rd state legislative district.

For the 119th United States Congress, New Jersey's 7th congressional district is represented by Thomas Kean Jr. (R, Westfield). New Jersey is represented in the United States Senate by Democrats Cory Booker (Newark, term ends 2027) and Andy Kim (Moorestown, term ends 2031).

For the 2026–2027 session, the 23rd legislative district of the New Jersey Legislature is represented in the State Senate by Doug Steinhardt (R, Lopatcong Township) and in the General Assembly by John DiMaio (R, Hackettstown) and Erik Peterson (R, Franklin Township).

Warren County is governed by a three-member Board of County Commissioners, who are chosen at-large on a staggered basis in partisan elections with one seat coming up for election each year as part of the November general election. At an annual reorganization meeting held in the beginning of January, the board selects one of its members to serve as Commissioner Director and other as Deputy Director. As of 2025, Warren County's Commissioners are:

Deputy Director Jason J. Sarnoski (R, Lopatcong Township; 2025), Lori Ciesla (R, Lopatcong Township; 2026), and Director James R. Kern III (R, Pohatcong Township; 2027).

Constitutional officers of Warren County are: Clerk Holly Mackey (R, Alpha; 2027), Sheriff James McDonald Sr. (R, Phillipsburg; 2025) and Surrogate Michael J. Doherty (R, Washington; 2025).

=== Politics ===
As of March 2011, there were a total of 5,410 registered voters in Hackettstown, of which 1,169 (21.6% vs. 21.5% countywide) were registered as Democrats, 1,764 (32.6% vs. 35.3%) were registered as Republicans and 2,468 (45.6% vs. 43.1%) were registered as Unaffiliated. There were 9 voters registered as Libertarians or Greens. Among the town's 2010 Census population, 55.6% (vs. 62.3% in Warren County) were registered to vote, including 69.8% of those ages 18 and over (vs. 81.5% countywide).

Gubernatorial election results for Hackettstown
Year	Republican		Democratic		Third party(ies)	
Year	No.	%	No.	%	No.	%
2025	1,740	50.12%	1,709	49.22%	23	0.66%
2021	1,619	57.60%	1,168	41.55%	24	0.85%
2017	1,257	58.55%	836	38.94%	54	2.52%
2013	1,543	72.48%	545	25.60%	41	1.93%
2009	1,547	62.15%	662	26.60%	280	11.25%
2005	1,533	59.88%	919	35.90%	108	4.22%

In the 2012 presidential election, Republican Mitt Romney received 1,973 votes (52.2% vs. 56.0% countywide), ahead of Democrat Barack Obama with 1,661 votes (44.0% vs. 40.8%) and other candidates with 77 votes (2.0% vs. 1.7%), among the 3,777 ballots cast by the town's 5,516 registered voters, for a turnout of 68.5% (vs. 66.7% in Warren County). In the 2008 presidential election, Republican John McCain received 2,090 votes (52.7% vs. 55.2% countywide), ahead of Democrat Barack Obama with 1,724 votes (43.4% vs. 41.4%) and other candidates with 64 votes (1.6% vs. 1.6%), among the 3,969 ballots cast by the town's 5,437 registered voters, for a turnout of 73.0% (vs. 73.4% in Warren County). In the 2004 presidential election, Republican George W. Bush received 2,368 votes (60.3% vs. 61.0% countywide), ahead of Democrat John Kerry with 1,492 votes (38.0% vs. 37.2%) and other candidates with 48 votes (1.2% vs. 1.3%), among the 3,928 ballots cast by the town's 5,241 registered voters, for a turnout of 74.9% (vs. 76.3% in the whole county).

United States presidential election results for Hackettstown
Year	Republican		Democratic		Third party(ies)	
Year	No.	%	No.	%	No.	%
2024	2,490	54.20%	2,020	43.97%	84	1.83%
2020	2,473	51.02%	2,280	47.04%	94	1.94%
2016	2,193	54.51%	1,659	41.24%	171	4.25%
2012	1,973	53.17%	1,661	44.76%	77	2.07%
2008	2,090	53.89%	1,724	44.46%	64	1.65%
2004	2,368	60.59%	1,492	38.18%	48	1.23%

In the 2013 gubernatorial election, Republican Chris Christie received 72.5% of the vote (1,543 cast), ahead of Democrat Barbara Buono with 25.6% (545 votes), and other candidates with 1.9% (41 votes), among the 2,166 ballots cast by the town's 5,608 registered voters (37 ballots were spoiled), for a turnout of 38.6%. In the 2009 gubernatorial election, Republican Chris Christie received 1,547 votes (61.1% vs. 61.3% countywide), ahead of Democrat Jon Corzine with 662 votes (26.1% vs. 25.7%), Independent Chris Daggett with 250 votes (9.9% vs. 9.8%) and other candidates with 30 votes (1.2% vs. 1.5%), among the 2,533 ballots cast by the town's 5,321 registered voters, yielding a 47.6% turnout (vs. 49.6% in the county).

United States Senate election results for Hackettstown1
Year	Republican		Democratic		Third party(ies)	
Year	No.	%	No.	%	No.	%
2024	2,397	53.89%	1,938	43.57%	113	2.54%
2018	1,779	55.46%	1,277	39.81%	152	4.74%
2012	1,900	53.73%	1,572	44.46%	64	1.81%
2006	1,289	59.51%	788	36.38%	89	4.11%

United States Senate election results for Hackettstown2
Year	Republican		Democratic		Third party(ies)	
Year	No.	%	No.	%	No.	%
2020	2,406	50.68%	2,215	46.66%	126	2.65%
2014	1,041	58.71%	680	38.35%	52	2.93%
2013	916	63.35%	515	35.62%	15	1.04%
2008	2,058	56.37%	1,527	41.82%	66	1.81%

== Education ==
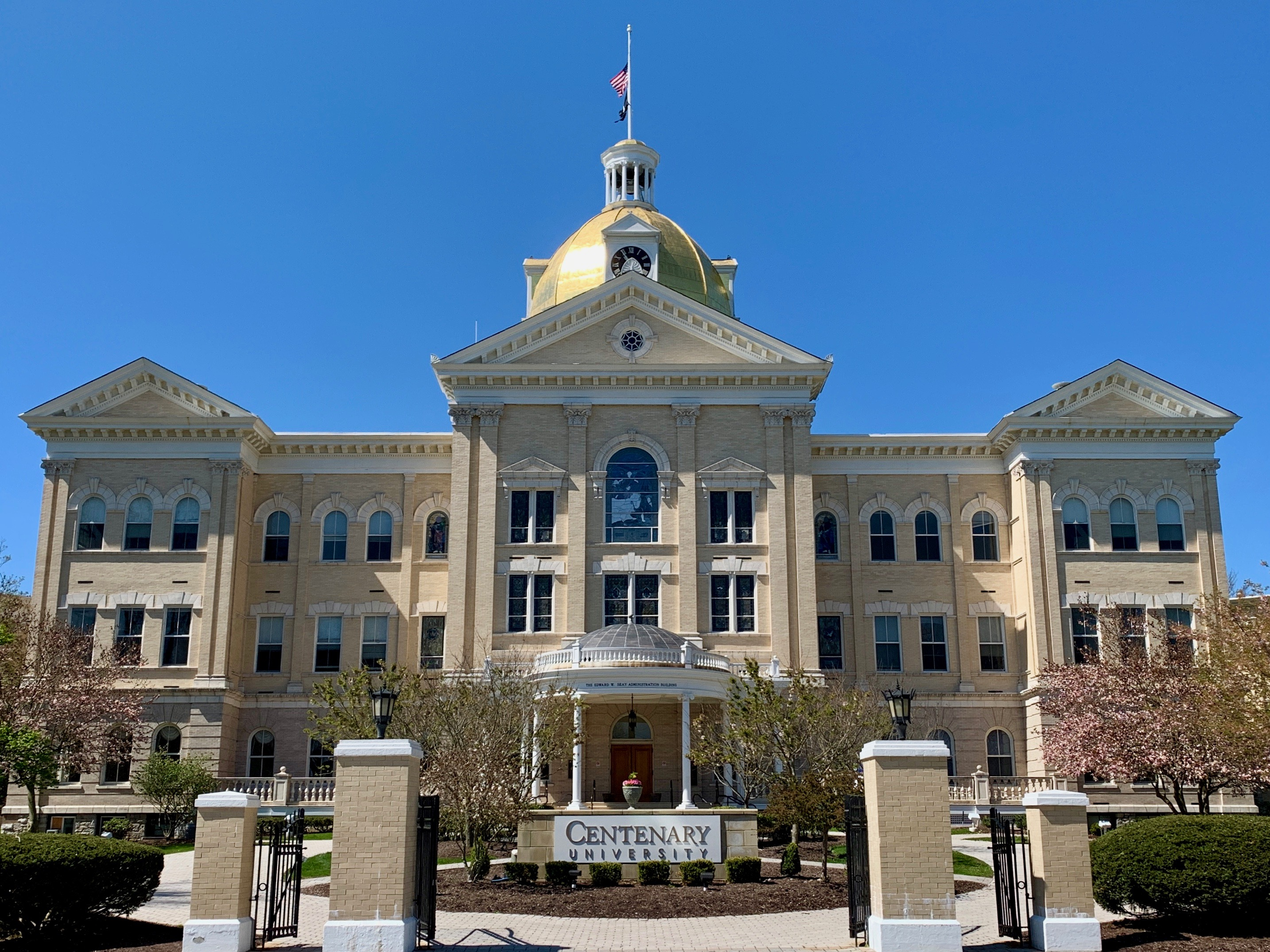
Edward Seay Administration Building, Centenary University

The Hackettstown School District serves students in pre-kindergarten through twelfth grade. The district serves students in four schools: two elementary schools (covering K-4), a middle school (5–8), and a four-year high school (9–12). As of the 2021–22 school year, the district, comprised of four schools, had an enrollment of 2,003 students and 172.5 classroom teachers (on an FTE basis), for a student–teacher ratio of 11.6:1. Schools in the district (with 2021–22 enrollment data from the National Center for Education Statistics) are Hatchery Hill School with 275 students in grades PreK-1, Willow Grove School with 368 students in grades 2–4, Hackettstown Middle School with 475 students in grades 5-8 and Hackettstown High School with 869 students in grades 9–12. Students from the townships of Allamuchy, Independence, and Liberty, attend the district's high school as part of sending/receiving relationships. For the 2001–2002 school year, Hackettstown Middle School was recognized with the National Blue Ribbon Award of Excellence from the United States Department of Education, the highest honor that an American school can achieve.

Students from the town and from all of Warren County are eligible to attend Ridge and Valley Charter School in Frelinghuysen Township (for grades K–8) or Warren County Technical School in Washington borough (for 9–12), with special education services provided by local districts supplemented throughout the county by the Warren County Special Services School District in Oxford Township (for Pre-K–12).

Centenary University, a private university affiliated with the United Methodist Church, was founded in 1867 as a preparatory school and evolved into a junior college and later a four-year undergraduate college. In 2017 the college was granted University status by the Middle States Commission on Higher Education. Centenary University is the only four-year post-secondary institution in Warren County.

== Media ==
- WRNJ at 1510 AM and simulcast on FM Translators 92.7 FM 104.7 FM and 105.7 FM, is licensed to Hackettstown and locally owned and operated.
- WXPJ at 91.9 FM – Originally Centenary University radio, the station was sold in 2015 and is owned and operated by the University of Pennsylvania.
- Two regional Advance Digital publications serve the town, The Star-Ledger of Newark, and The Express-Times of Easton, Pa. The company formerly kept a newsroom for the free weekly newspaper The Warren Reporter on East Moore Street, which has since been closed and folded into its digital products.

== Transportation ==
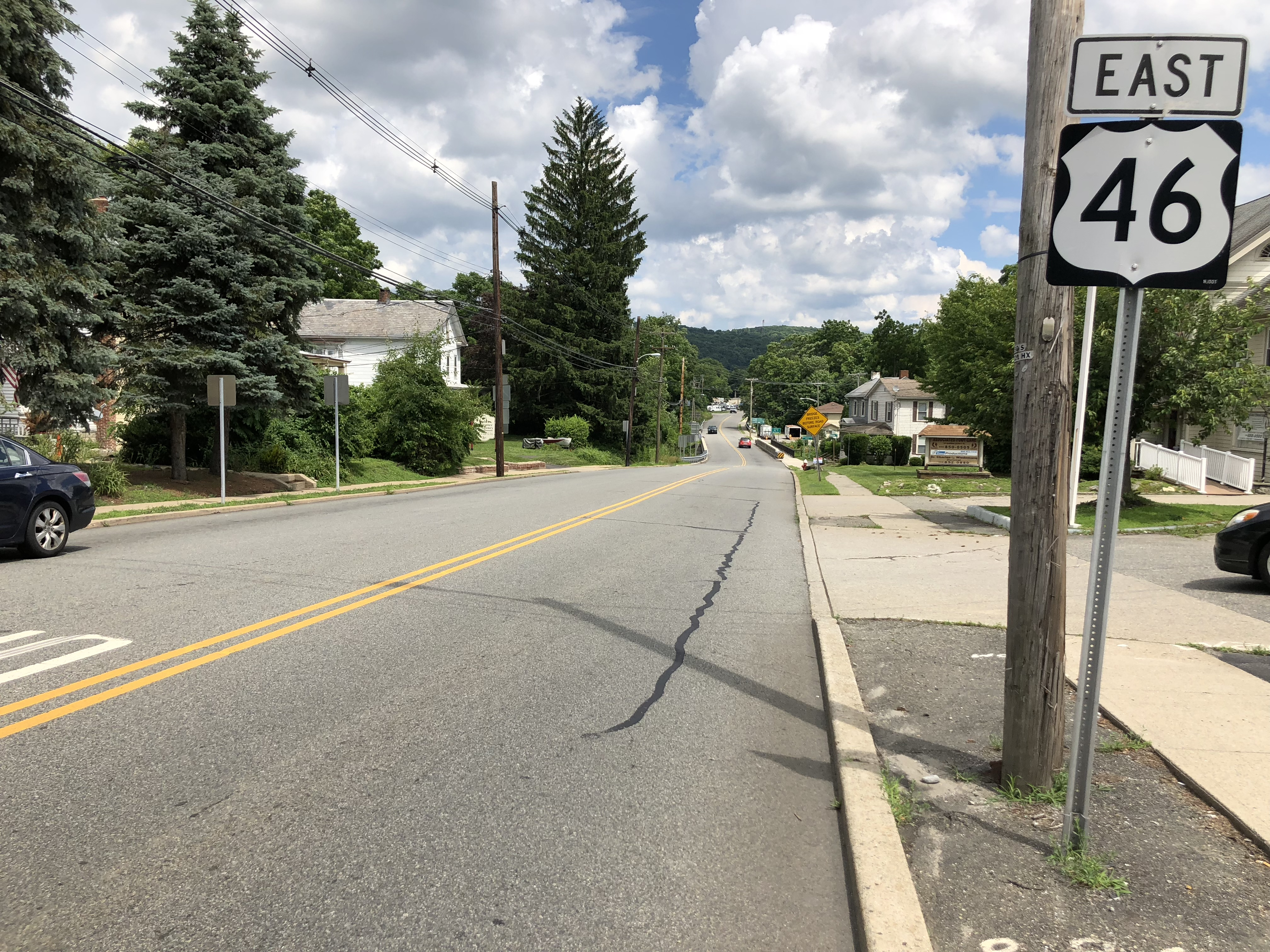
U.S. Route 46 in Hackettstown

=== Roads and highways ===
As of May 2010, the town had a total of 34.47 miles (55.47 km) of roadways, of which 28.83 miles (46.40 km) were maintained by the municipality, 2.96 miles (4.76 km) by Warren County and 2.68 miles (4.31 km) by the New Jersey Department of Transportation.

Passing through Hackettstown are U.S. Route 46, Route 57, and County Route 517. Route 182 exists completely within the boundaries of Hackettstown. Interstate 80 runs to the north of the town.

=== Public transportation ===
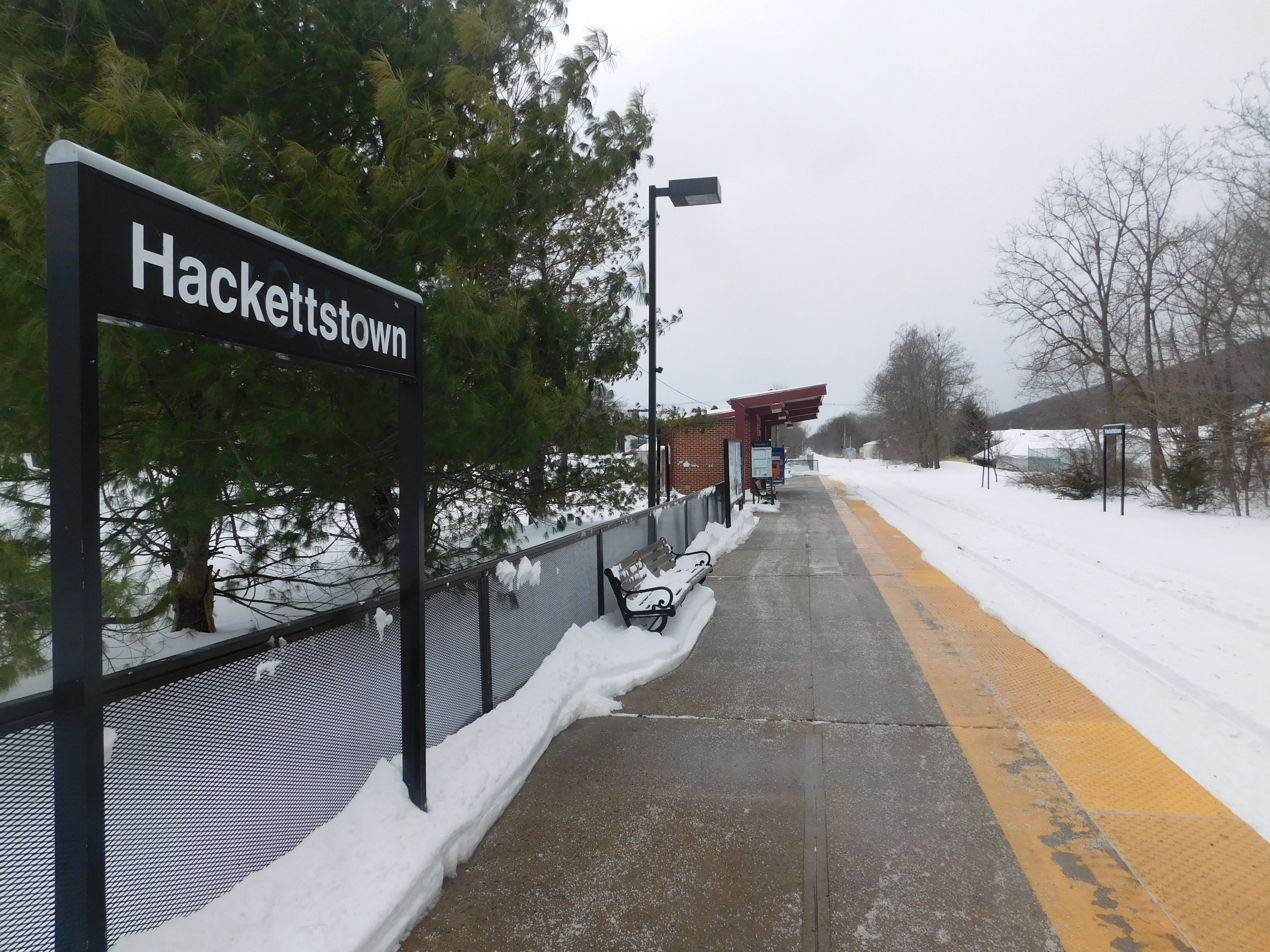
Hackettstown station

The Hackettstown station is the western terminus of the NJ Transit Morristown Line and the Montclair-Boonton Line, which both provide service to Hoboken Terminal with connections to Pennsylvania Station in Midtown Manhattan via Midtown Direct trains. New Jersey Transit bus service used to be provided on the MCM5 and 973 local routes before they were discontinued.

Warren County operates a shuttle along Route 57 to Washington Township that operates on an hourly loop on weekdays, with connections available to a shuttle to Phillipsburg.

=== Airports ===
Hackettstown is located 49.3 miles (79.3 km) from Newark Liberty International Airport in Newark / Elizabeth. Lehigh Valley International Airport, near Allentown, Pennsylvania, is 39.0 miles (62.8 km) away.

Hackettstown Airport, a small general aviation airport with the official database designation of (FAA LID: N05) is located in adjoining Mansfield Township, only a few hundred yards from the municipal border with Hackettstown proper.

== Points of interest ==
- Union Cemetery, Mountain Avenue
- Mars Wrigley US Headquarters
- 'Billy Yank' Civil War Monument
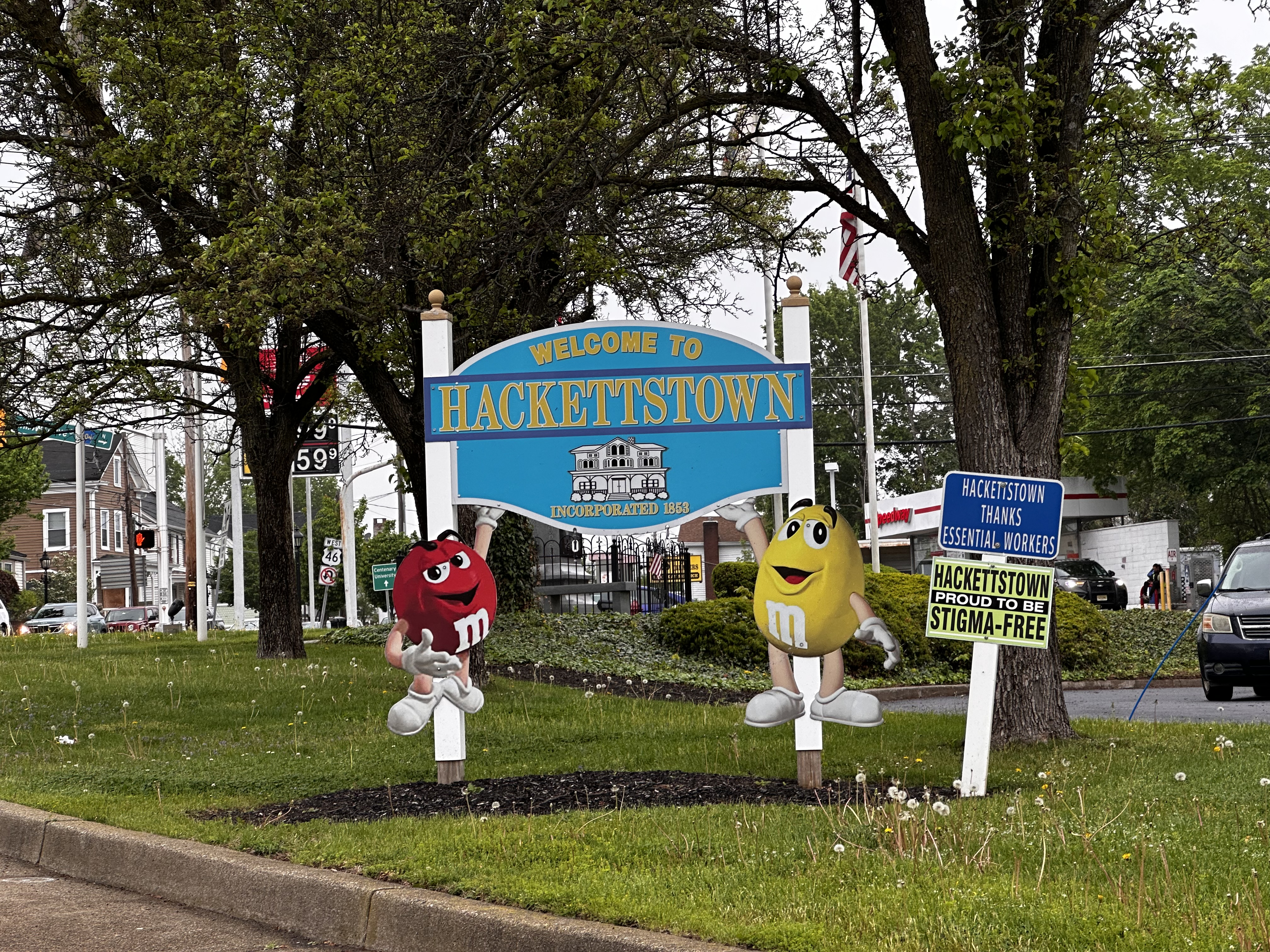
"Five Corner Intersection"

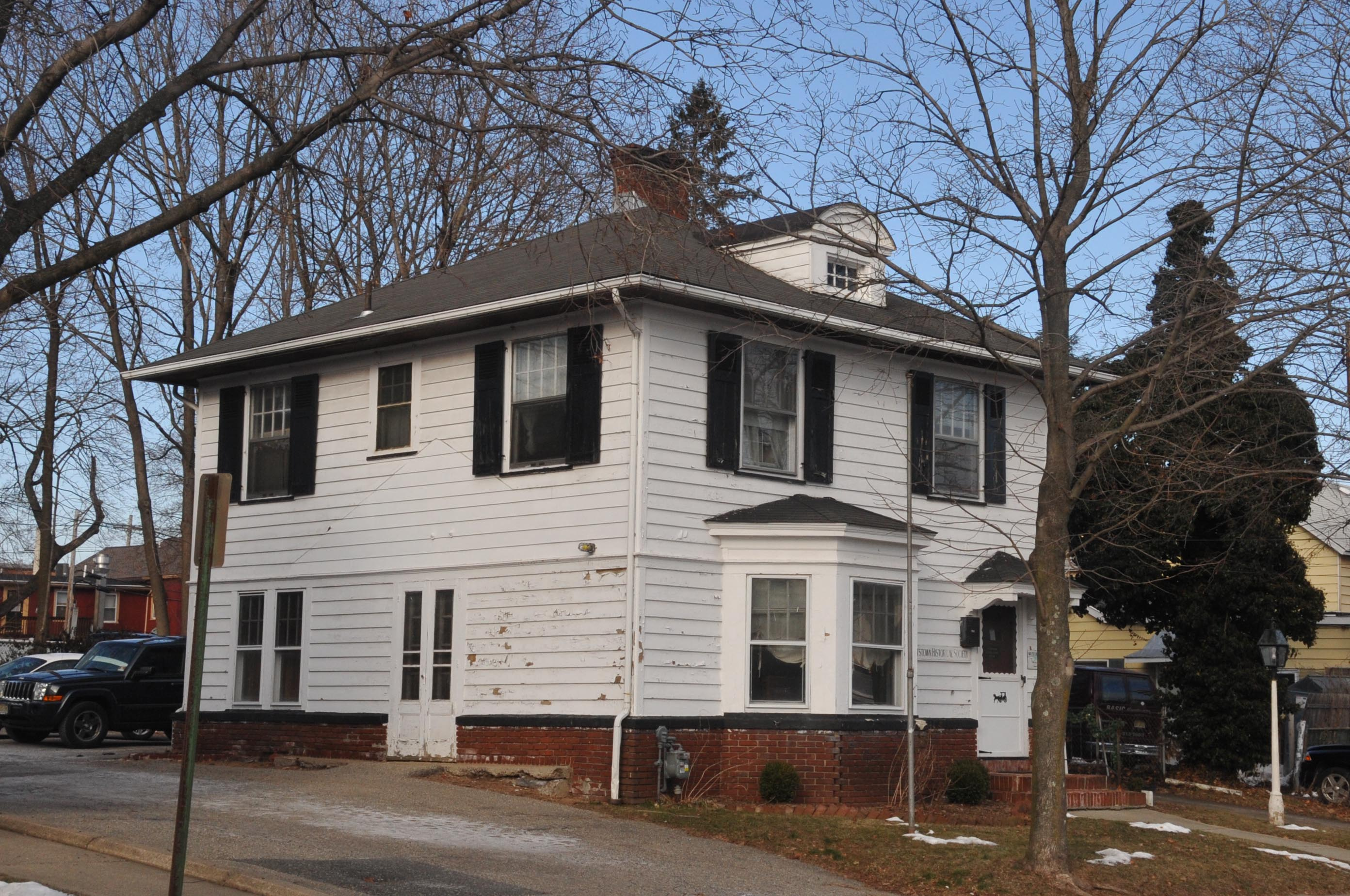
Historical Society Museum

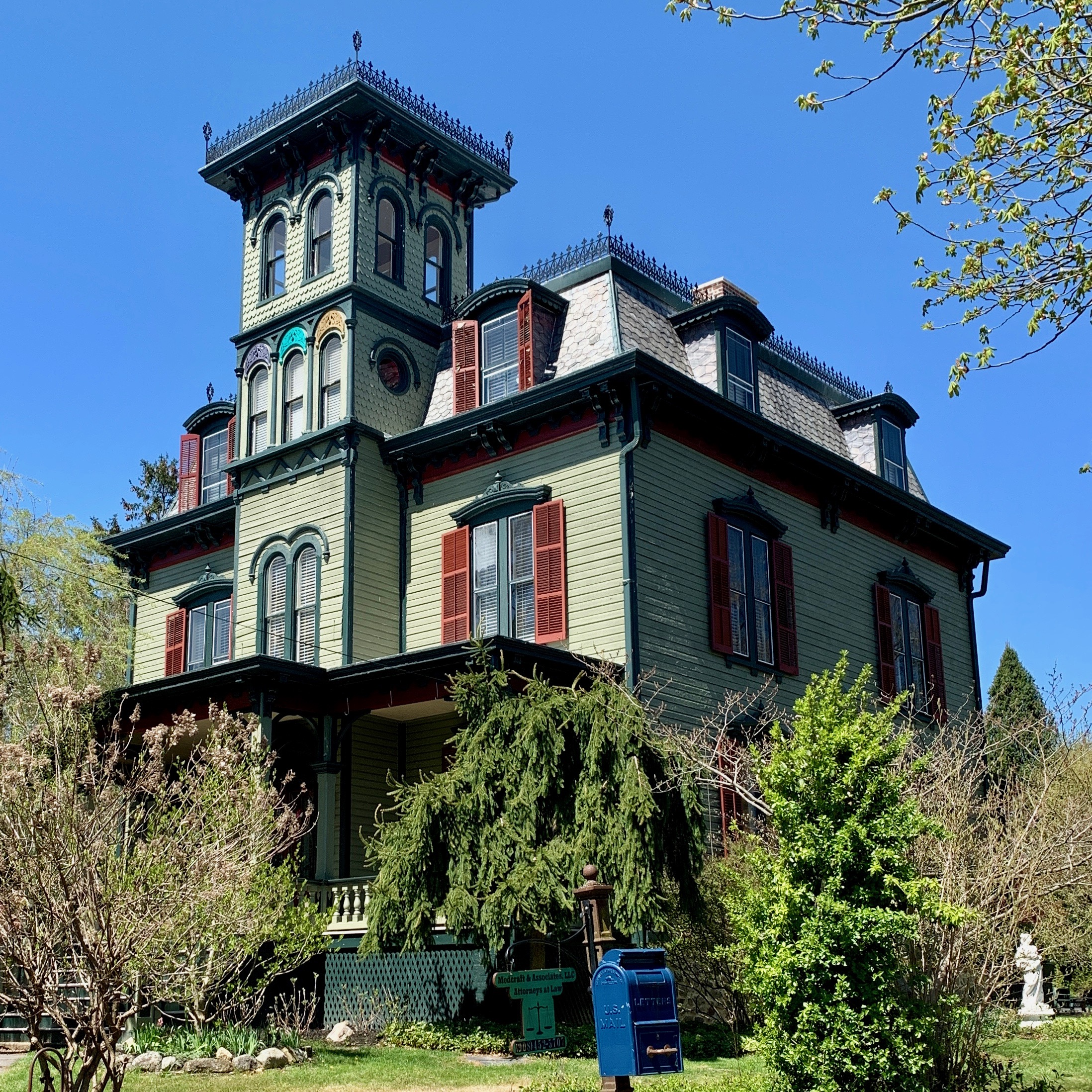
Jacob C. Allen House, listed on the National Register of Historic Places

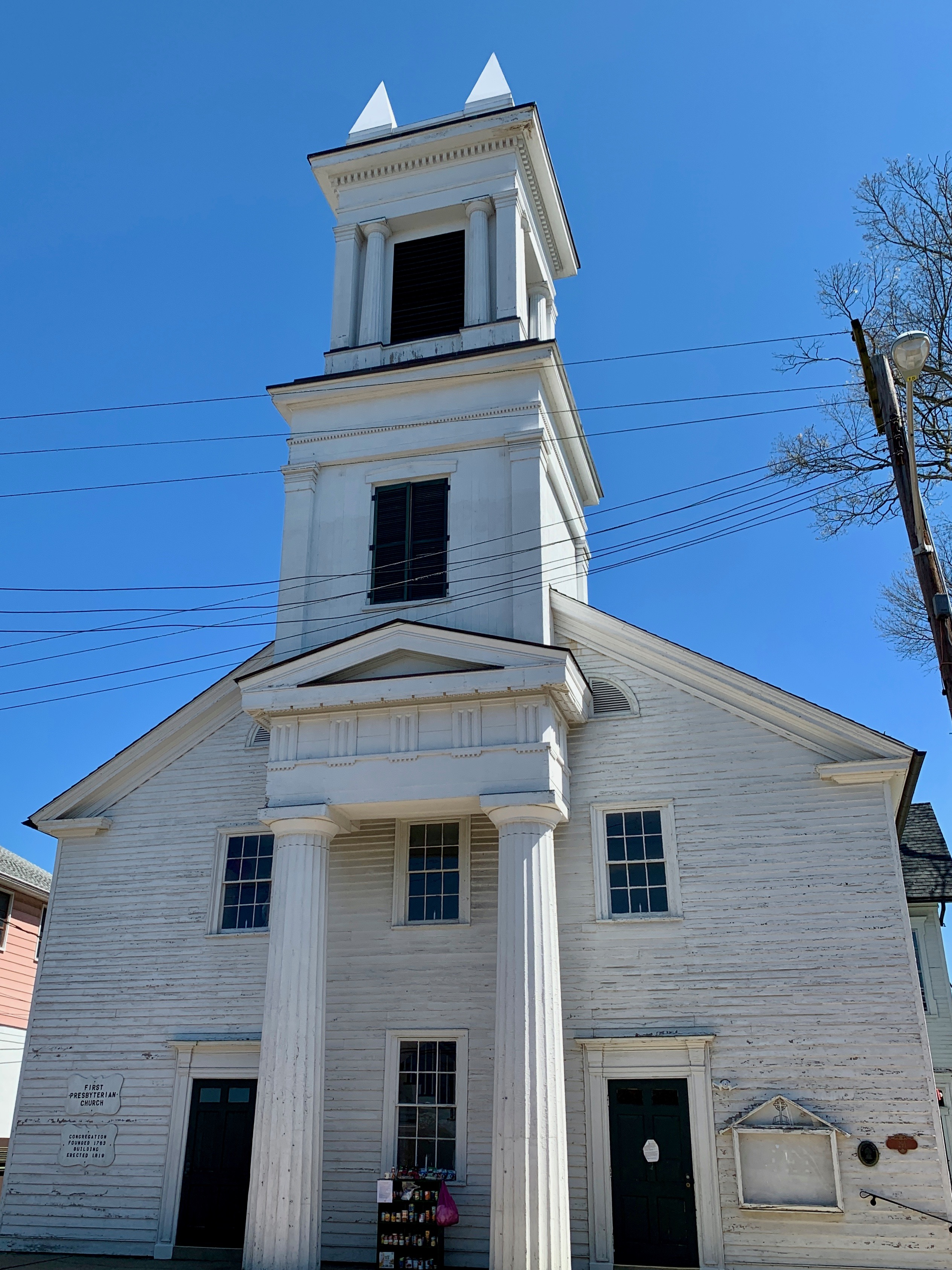
First Presbyterian Church

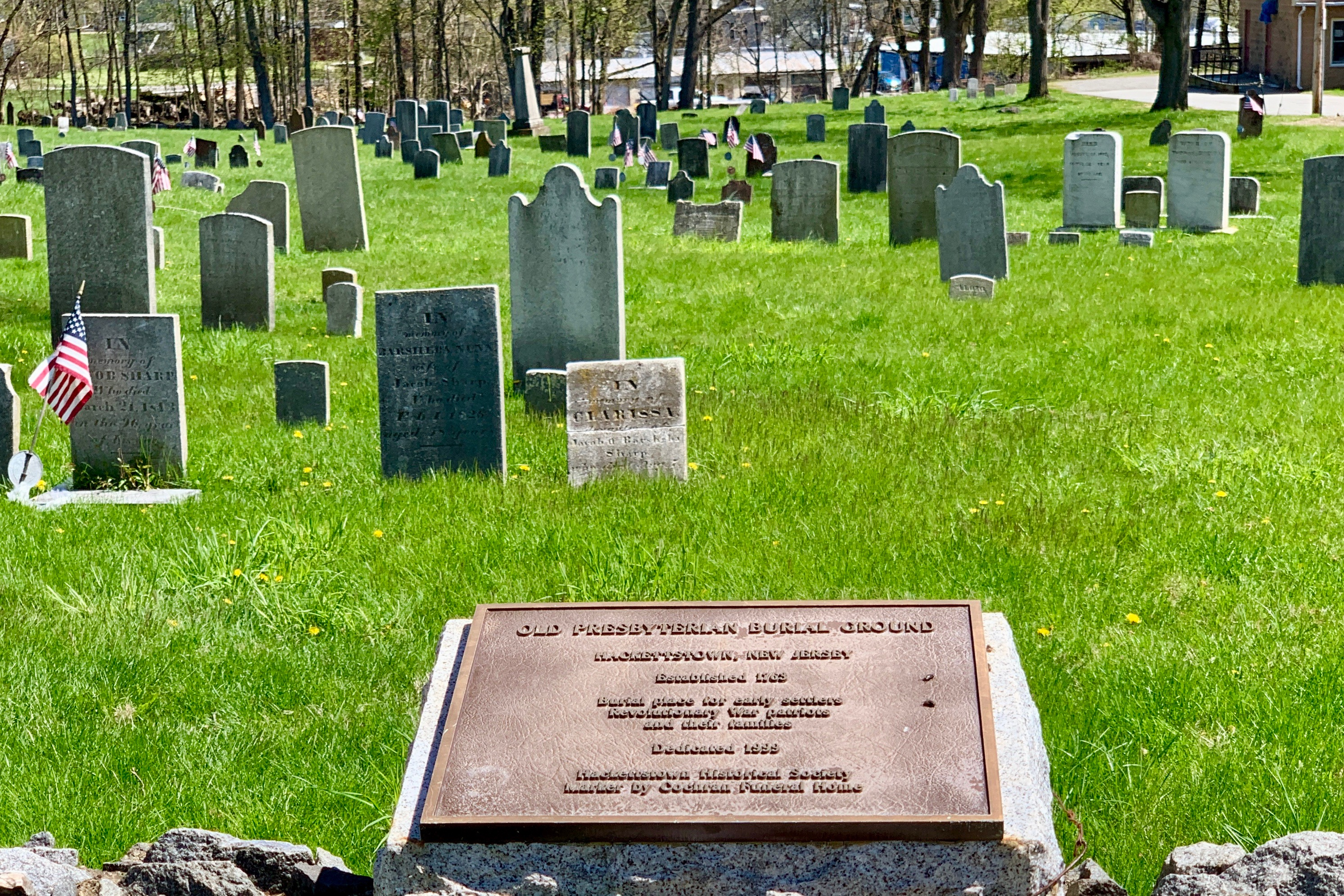
Old Presbyterian Burial Ground

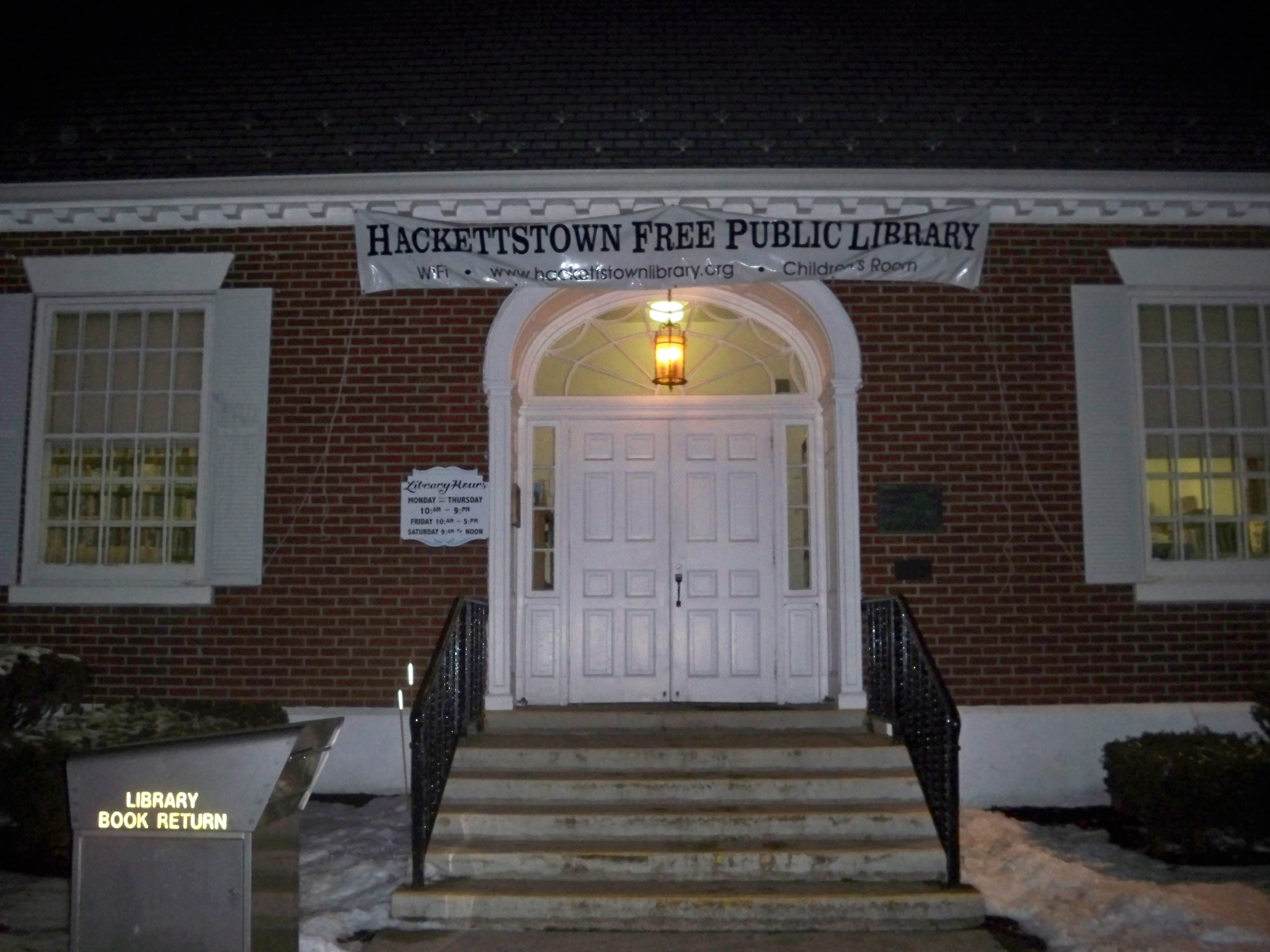
Hackettstown Free Public Library

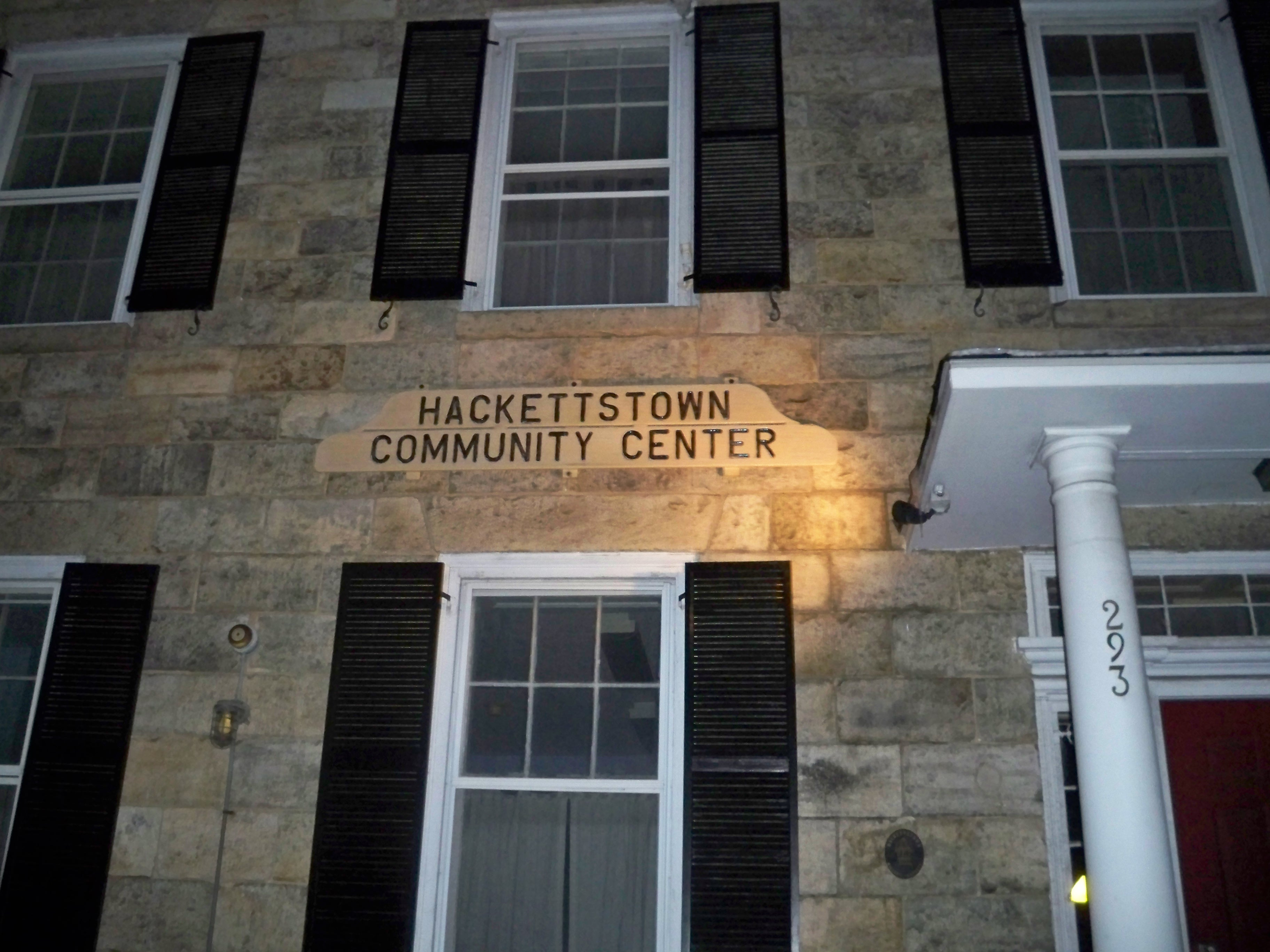
Hackettstown Community Center

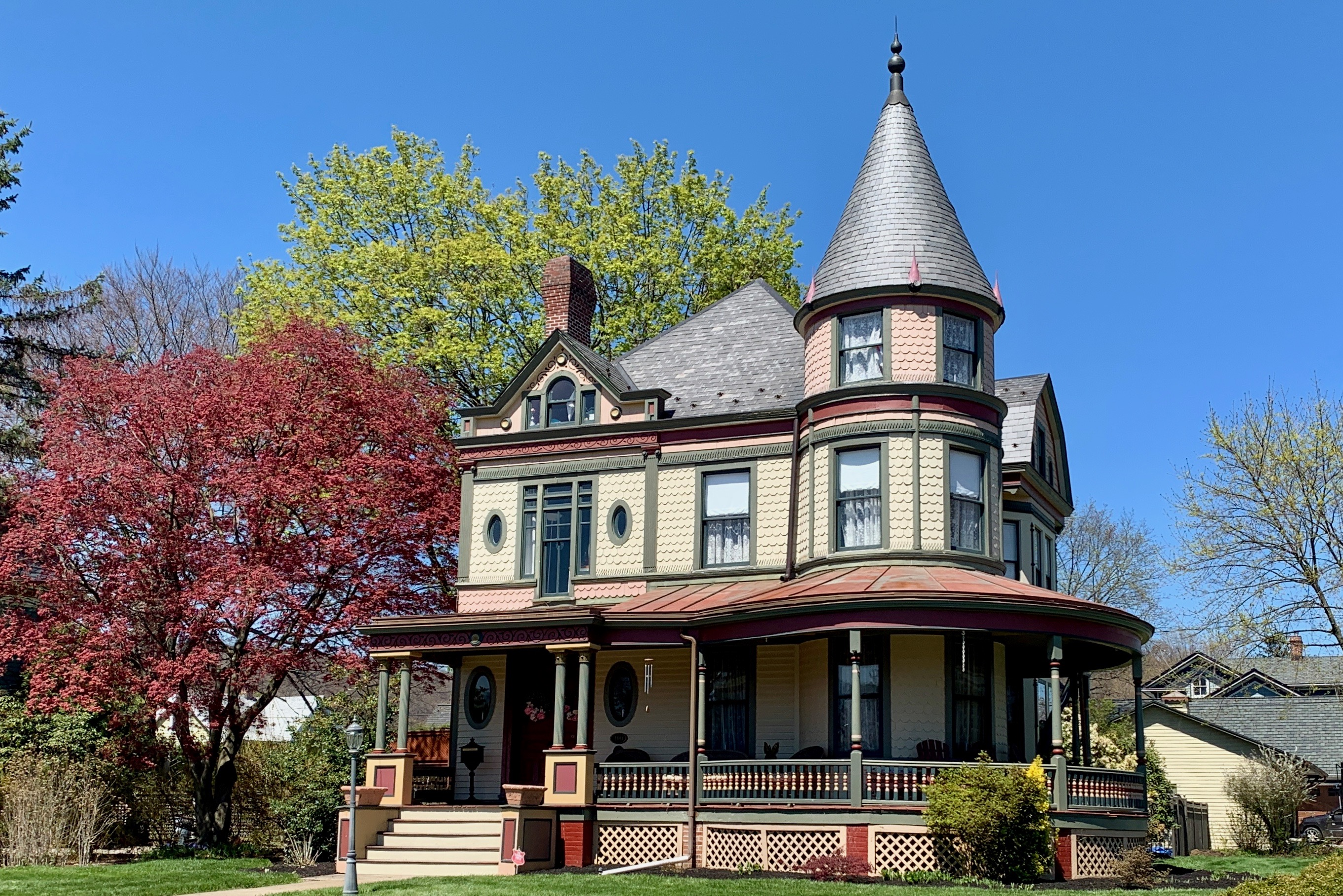
400 West Moore Street

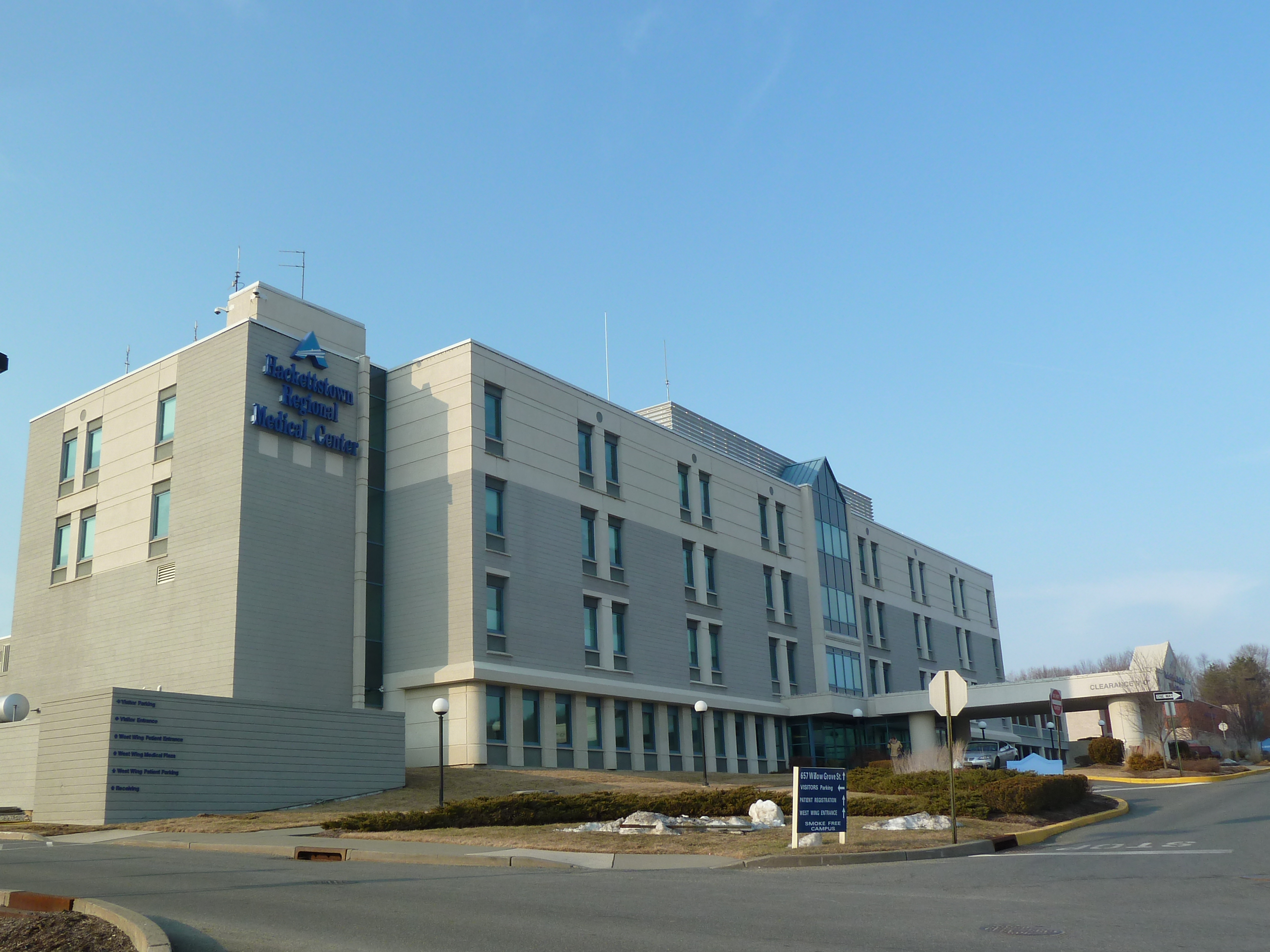
Hackettstown Medical Center

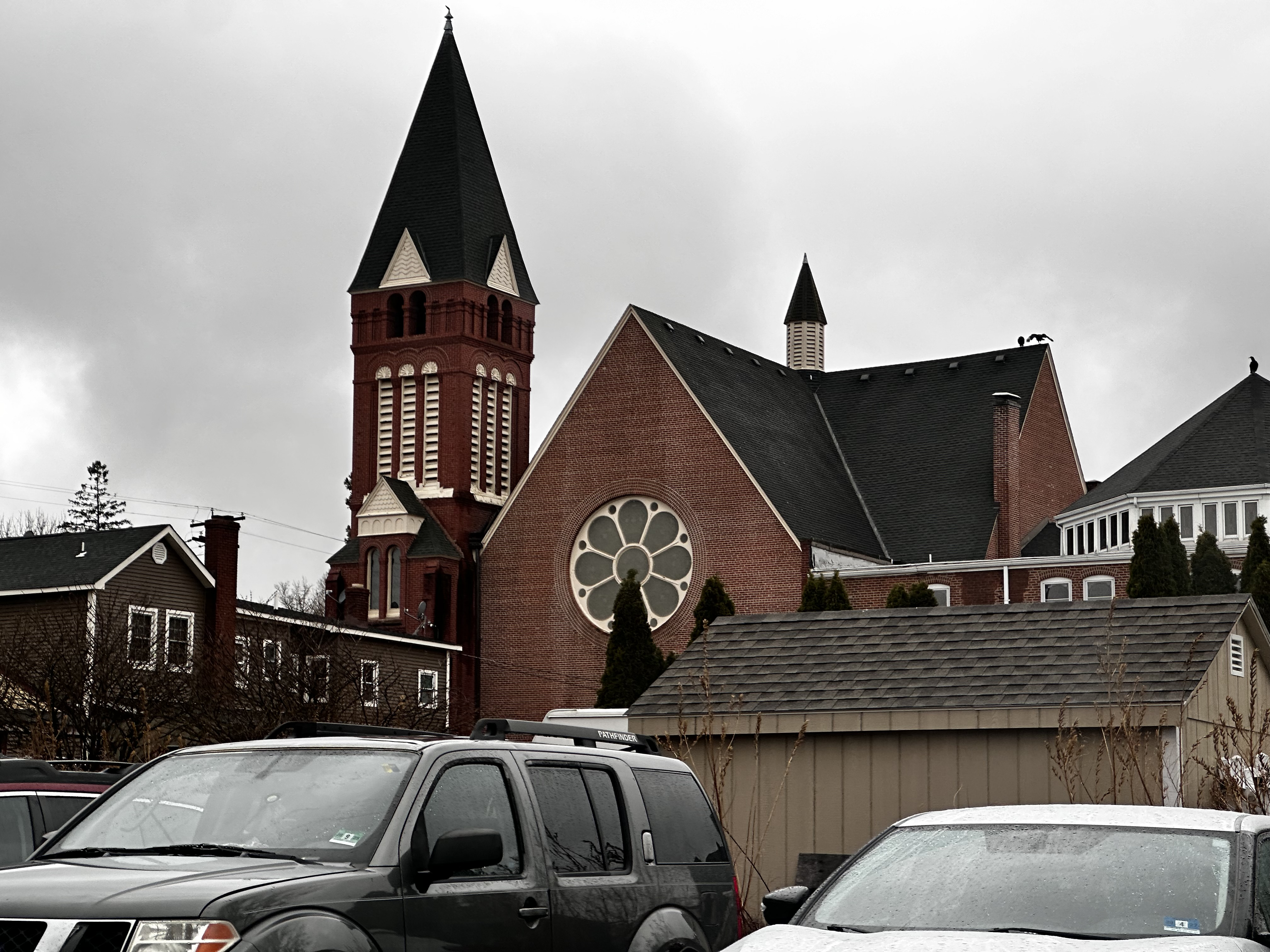
Trinity Church

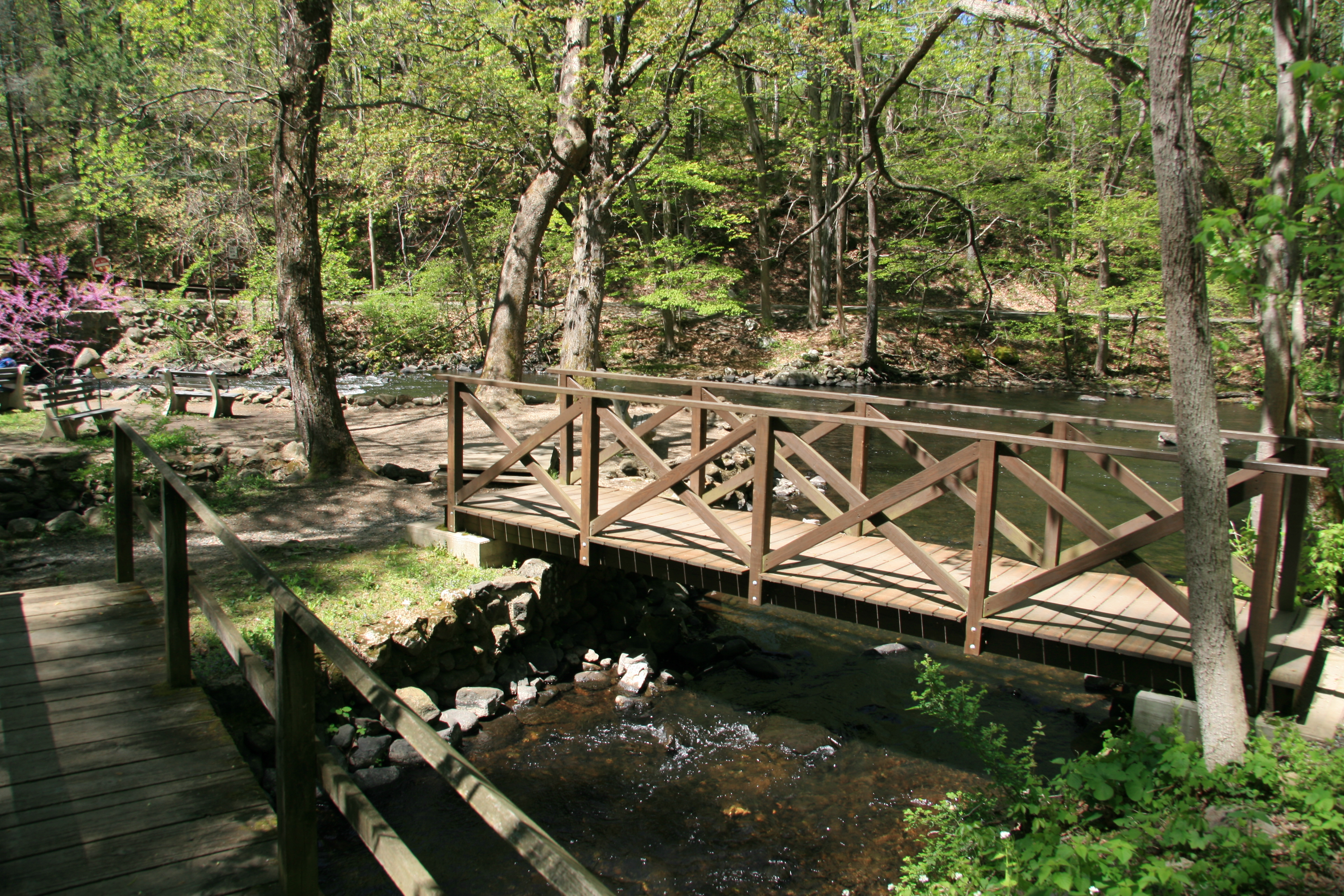
Stephens State Park

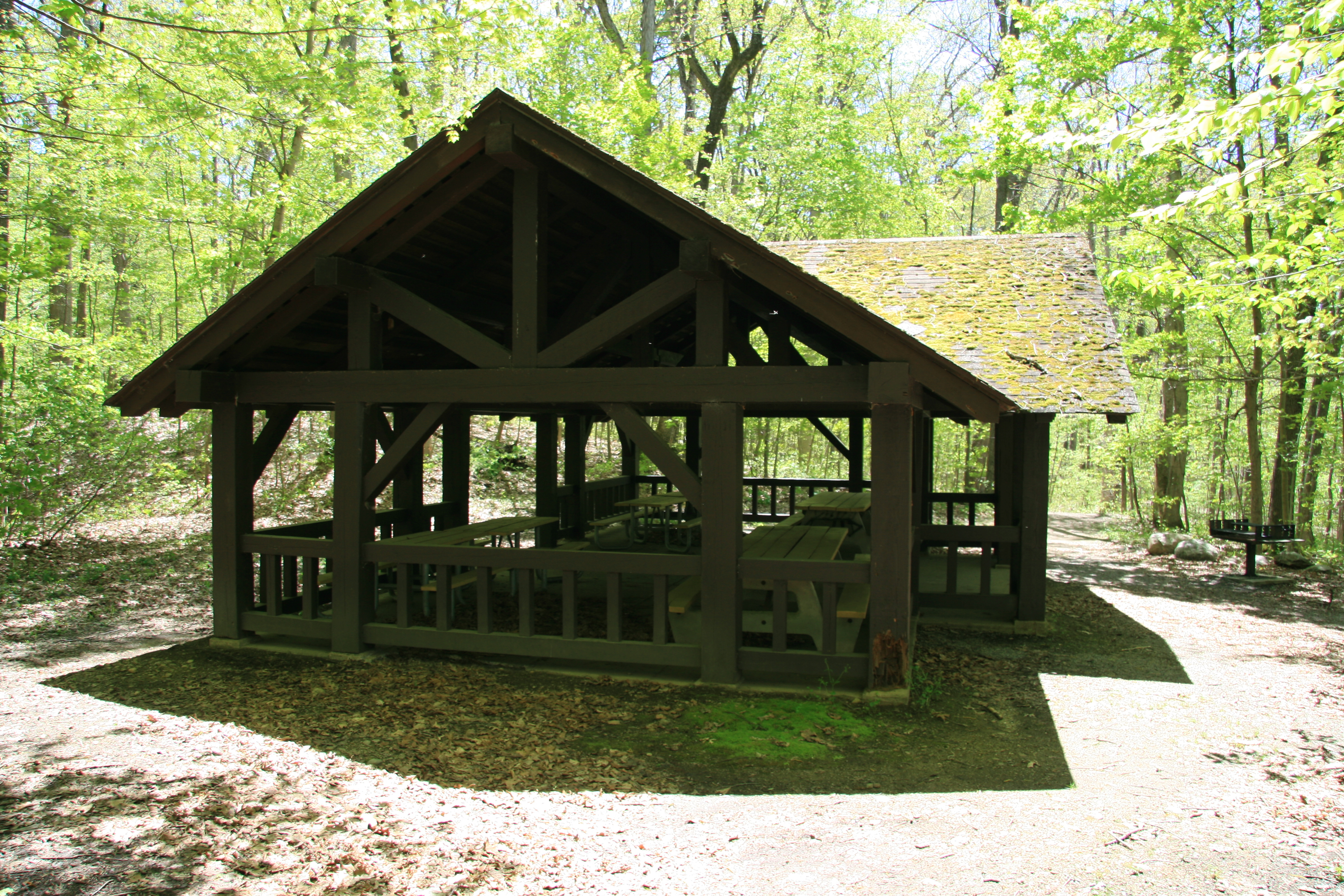
Stephens State Park

== Notable people ==
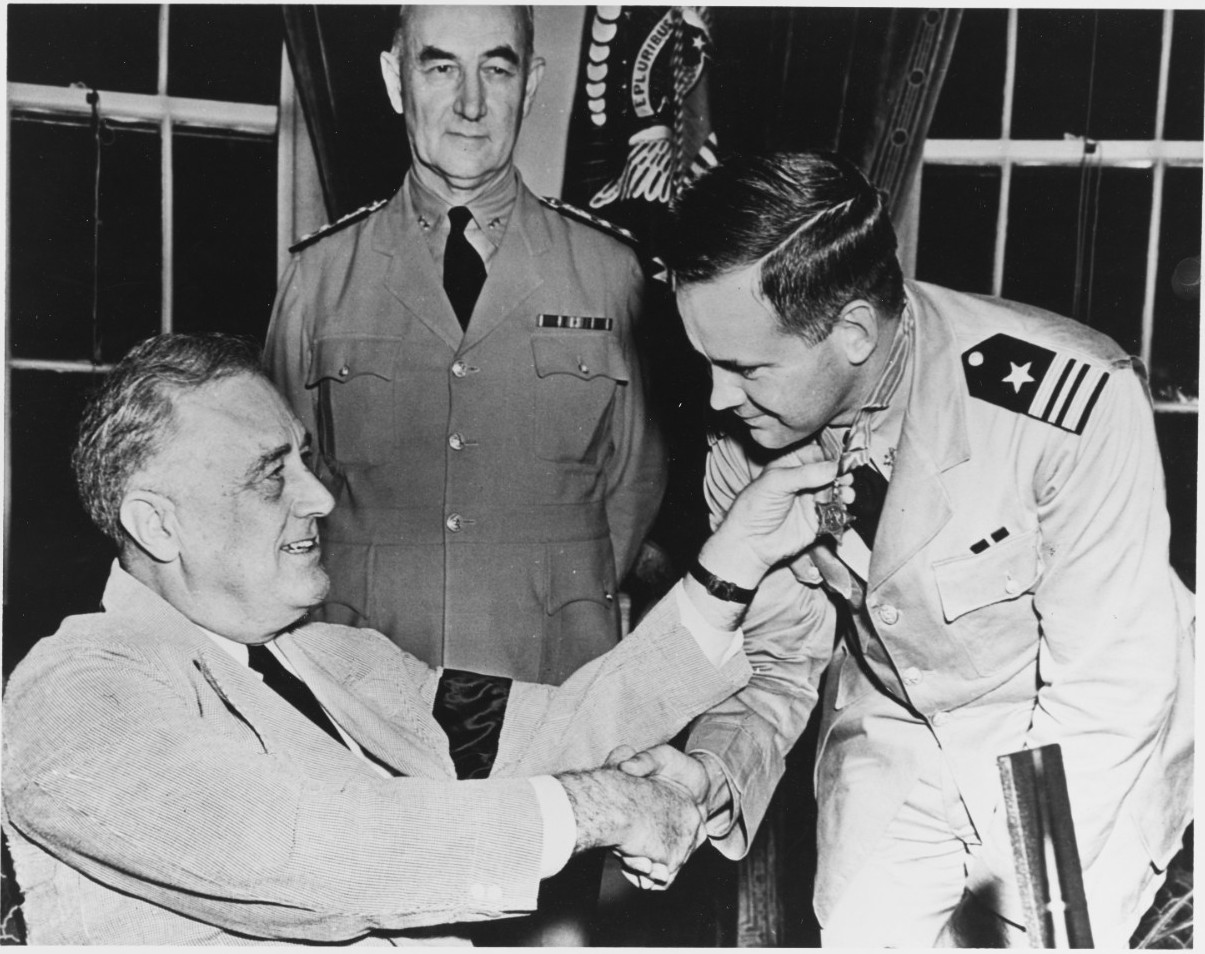
Lt. Bulkeley receiving the Medal of Honor c. 1942

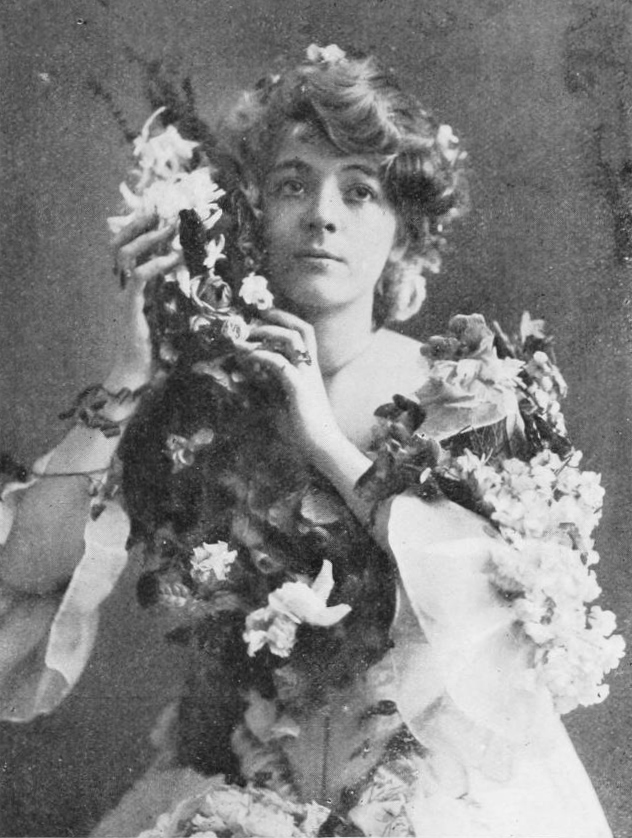
Izetta Jewel c. 1903

People who were born in, residents of, or otherwise closely associated with Hackettstown include:

- Abraham H. Albertson (1872–1964), one of Seattle's most prominent architects of the first half of the 20th century
- John D. Bulkeley (1911–1996), Vice Admiral in the United States Navy, Medal of Honor winner, PT boat skipper who evacuated General Douglas MacArthur from Corregidor
- Bette Cooper (1920–2017), Miss America 1937
- Jim Courter (born 1941), former Member of Congress
- Jonathan Townley Crane (1819–1880), clergyman, author, abolitionist, father of author Stephen Crane, founder of Centenary Collegiate Institute
- Christina Desiderio (born 2000), artistic gymnast
- John DiMaio (born 1955), minority leader of the New Jersey General Assembly who served as mayor of Hackettstown from 1991 to 1999
- Brian Fallon (born 1980), lead singer for The Gaslight Anthem / The Horrible Crowes
- John Clifford Heed (1862–1908), composer and musician, best known for composing over 60 marches
- Kenneth Hopper (1926–2019), engineer
- Izetta Jewel (1883–1978), born Izetta Jewel Kenney, actress and women's rights activist
- Ken Kelsch (1947–2023), cinematographer of films including Bad Lieutenant and Big Night
- Cole Kimball (born 1985), pitcher who has played for the Washington Nationals
- William Logan (1914–2002), cyclist who competed in the tandem and team pursuit events at the 1936 Summer Olympics
- Kristen Maloney (born 1981), former gymnastics Olympian
- Naked Cowboy (stage name of Robert John Burck, born 1970), street performer and 2012 Presidential candidate
- Louis F. Post (1849–1928), journalist, lawyer, author, former US Attorney, former Assistant United States Secretary of Labor during the Wilson administration
- The Simonski Sisters, family musical act who performed on The Lawrence Welk Show
- Jimmi Simpson (born 1975), Emmy nominated film and television actor
- Joe Stanowicz (1921–1999), football player who attended the United States Military Academy where he played at the guard position for the Army Black Knights football team
- Anthony Veneziano (born 1997), Major League Baseball pitcher for the Kansas City Royals
- George Theodore Werts (1846–1910), Governor of New Jersey (1893–1896)
