= Hopper (surname) =

Hopper is an English surname meaning “dancer” or “leaper”. Notable people with the surname include:

== People ==
- Abigail Hopper Gibbons (née Hopper, 1801–1893), American abolitionist
- Ailish Hopper, American poet
- Alan Hopper (born 1937), English footballer
- Allan Hopper, multiple people
- Andrew Hopper (1948–2018), British solicitor
- Andy Hopper (born 1977), American politician from Texas
- Andy Hopper (born 1953), British computer scientist
- Anita Hopper, 21st-century American molecular geneticist
- Annie Powe Hopper (1876–1952), American college dean
- Augustus Hopper
- Bill Hopper, multiple people
- Briallen Hopper, American writer and scholar
- Brian Hopper (born 1943), English musician
- Bruce Campbell Hopper (1891–1973), American WWI pilot and political scientist
- Catherine Odora Hoppers
- Christopher Hopper (1918–2009), British arts administrator
- Christopher Hopper (Methodist)
- Clay Hopper (1902–1976), American basketball player
- Darrel Hopper (born 1963), American football player
- Deborah Hopper, American costume designer
- Dennis Hopper (1936–2010), American actor
- DeWolf Hopper (1858–1935), American actor, singer, comedian and producer
- E. Mason Hopper (1885–1967), American film director
- Edward Hopper (1882–1967), American painter and printmaker
- Edna Wallace Hopper (1872–1959), American actress
- Fran Hopper (1922–2017), American comic book artist
- Frederick Hopper, founder of Elswick Hopper
- Gary Hopper, American politician
- Grace Hopper (1906–1992), American computer scientist and naval officer
- Hal Hopper (1912–1970), American musician, composer, and screenwriter
- Harrison Hopper (born 2000), English footballer
- Hedda Hopper (1885–1966), American actress and gossip columnist
- Henry J. Hopper, American politician and steel merchant
- Hugh Hopper (1945–2009), English guitarist and composer
- Humphrey Hopper (1764/5–1844), English mason and sculptor
- Irma Hopper, American fencer
- Isobel Hoppar (c. 1490–after 1538), Scottish courtier
- Isaac Hopper (1771–1852), American abolitionist and underground railroad pioneer
- J. Hopper (Kent cricketer) (fl. 1822–1827)
- Jacob Hopper (born 1997), Australian footballer
- Jade Hopper (born 1991), Australian tennis player
- James Hopper, multiple people
- Jerry Hopper (1907–1988), American film and television director
- Jessica Hopper (born 1976), American writer
- Jim Hopper, multiple people
- John Hopper, multiple people
- Josephine Hopper (1883–1968), American artist
- Ken Hopper, Australian rules footballer
- Kenneth Hopper (1926–2019), Scottish academic
- Kev Hopper (born 1961), English musician
- Lefty Hopper (1874-1959), American baseball player
- Linda Hopper (born 1959), American musician
- Luico Hopper (born 1952), American musician
- Mary Hopper (born 1951), American musical artist
- Matt Hopper (born 1985), English rugby player
- Matthew Hopper (1893–1978), English footballer
- Max Hopper (1934–2010), American IT manager
- Michael Hopper, Canadian Forces officer
- Niall Hopper (born 1935), Scottish footballer
- Norris Hopper (born 1979), American baseball player
- Paul Hopper, multiple people
- Queenie Scott-Hopper, English children's author
- R. J. Hopper (1910–1987), British archaeologist and historian
- Randy Hopper (born 1966), American politician
- Ray Hopper (born 1960), Australian politician
- Regina Hopper, American journalist and attorney
- Robin Hopper (1939–2017), Canadian ceramist
- Ruthanna Hopper (born 1972), American author and actress
- Ryan Hopper (born 1993), English footballer
- Santana Hopper (born 2004), American football player
- Sean Hopper, musical artist
- Shirley Ximena Hopper Russell (1886–1985), American artist
- Stephen Hopper (born 1951), Australian botanist
- Suzanne Hopper (1970–2011), American police officer
- Thomas Hopper, multiple people
- Tim Hopper, American actor
- Tony Hopper (1976–2018), English footballer
- Ty'Ron Hopper (born 2001), American footballer
- Vernon Hopper (1911–1988), American football coach
- Victoria Hopper (1909–2007), Canadian-born British actress
- Wilbert Hopper (1933–2006), Canadian business executive
- William Hopper, multiple people

== Fictional characters ==
- Doc Hopper, the villain in The Muppet Movie
- Franz Hopper, a character in Code Lyoko
- Jane Hopper, a character in the Netflix television series Stranger Things
- Jim Hopper, a character in the Netflix television series Stranger Things
- Hopper, the main antagonist of Pixar's 2nd animated film A Bug's Life (1998)
- Vance Hopper, a character in The Black Phone
