= William Hopper (disambiguation) =

William Hopper (1915–1970) was an American actor.

William or Bill Hopper may also refer to:

== People ==
- William Hopper (industrialist) (1816-1885), Scottish industrialist and sports proponent in Imperial Russia
- Bill Hopper (baseball) (1891–1965), American baseball player
- Bill Hopper (footballer) (born 1938), English footballer
- Bill Hopper (rugby league) (1922–2008), Welsh rugby league footballer
- William Hopper (politician) (born 1929), British banker and politician
- William DeWolf Hopper (1858–1935), American actor
- William Hopper (1966–2017), Canadian author of The Heathen's Guide to World Religions and other works

== Other uses ==
- Bill hopper (furniture), a receptacle used in the United States House of Representatives

== See also ==
- Wilbert Hopper (1933–2006), Canadian civil servant and businessman
