= Hoppen =

Hoppen is a surname. Notable people with the surname include:

- Dave Hoppen (born 1964), American basketball player
- Kelly Hoppen (born 1959), British interior designer, writer, and entrepreneur
- Larry Hoppen (1951–2012), American musician

== See also ==
- Hopper (surname)
- Joppen
