= Initial Flight Training =

Flight training course for U.S. Air Force officers

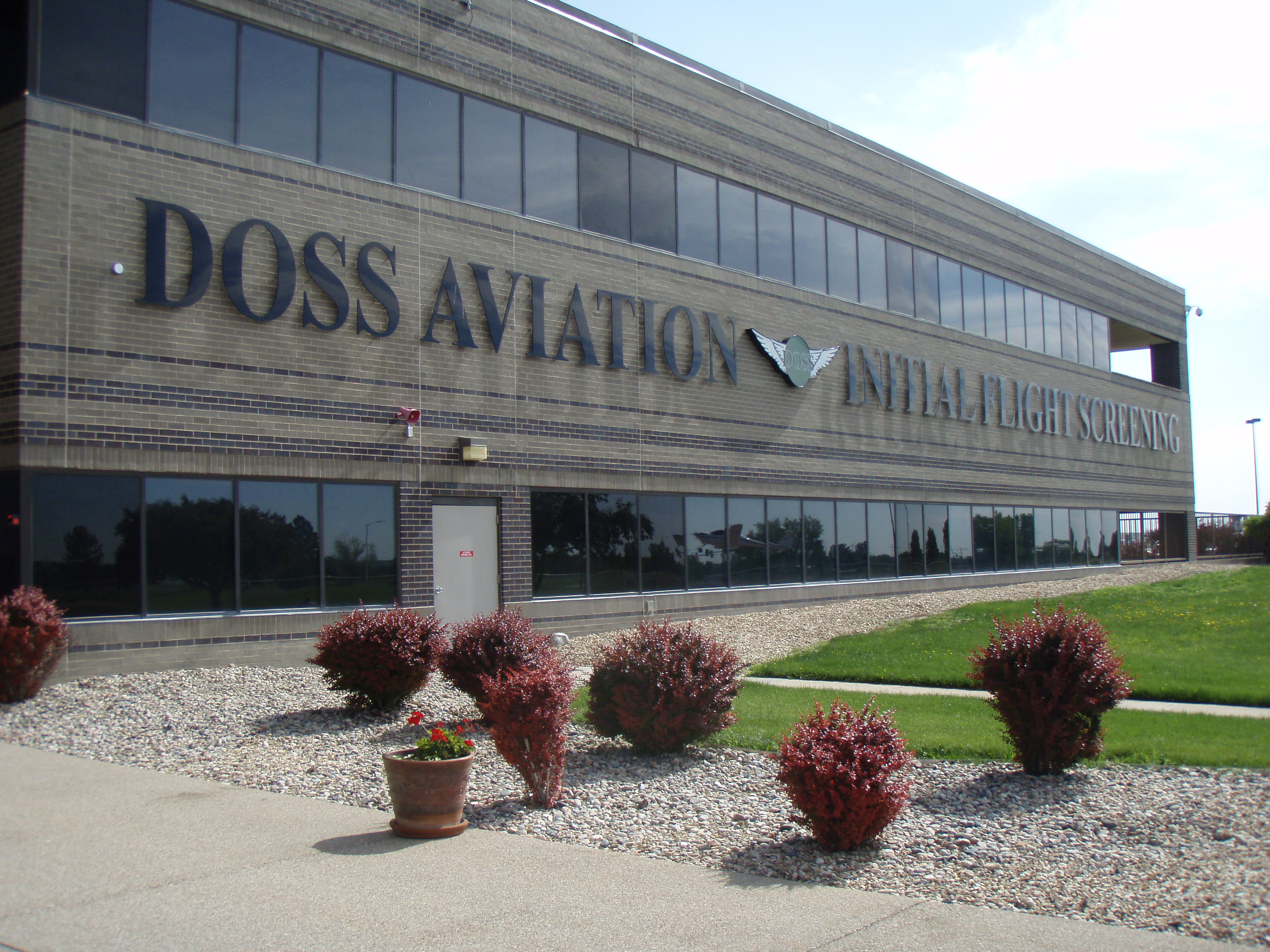
DOSS Aviation Building

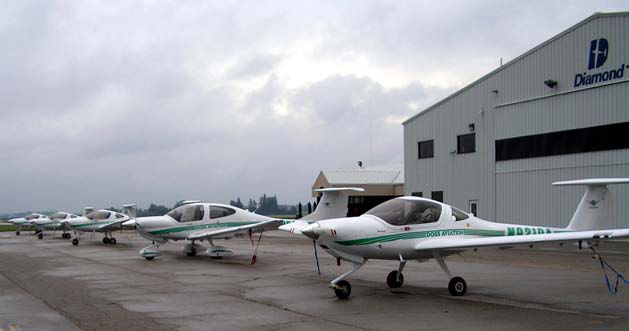
IFT Aircraft at a Diamond Aircraft Facility

Initial Flight Training (IFT) is a preliminary flight training course for U.S. Air Force officers, to include active-duty Regular Air Force, Air Force Reserve, and Air National Guard, who have been selected for Pilot training. Attendance consists of both newly commissioned USAF officers (i.e., second lieutenants) and prior-commissioned USAF officers (e.g., first lieutenants, captains and in very rare instances majors) with no previous rated flight experience.

IFT consolidated three separate programs:

Program	Students	Description
Pilot Indoctrination Program (PIP)/ Initial Flight Training (IFT)/ Academy Flight Training (AFT)	USAF Academy cadets	Conducted by military and civilian instructors at the USAF Academy Airfield;
Flight Instruction Program (FIP)	College/university Air Force ROTC cadets	Conducted by contracted civilian flight instructors at nearby civilian airports adjacent to those academic institutions,
Flight Screening Program Officer Training (FSPOT)	USAF Officer Training School graduates	Conducted at Hondo Municipal Airport, Texas

These three programs were originally for pilot candidates who did not have at least an FAA Private Pilot Certificate (e.g. current pilots and navigators/combat system operators), and were consolidated into the current single civilian contractor-operated program under direct USAF auspices and oversight of the 12th Flying Training Wing (12 FTW) of the Air Education and Training Command (AETC) at Randolph AFB, Texas, and its subordinate 306th Flying Training Group (306 FTG) at the USAF Academy, Colorado. IFT is conducted at Pueblo Memorial Airport, Colorado and is most similar to the former FSPOT for OTS graduates since it is conducted at a single site and all students are commissioned USAF officers.

IFT students must be undergraduate pilot training (UPT) candidates and be medically qualified with a Federal Aviation Administration Class III airman medical certificate and a USAF Flying Class 1 or 1A flight physical, as appropriate. The IFT curriculum is highly structured and fast-paced.

The IFT program began operations on 1 October 2006. Doss Aviation was the original contract, but now CAE holds the contract. IFT conducts flight screening for 1,300 to 1,700 USAF officers annually. As the gateway to USAF aviation, IFT provides initial flying training allowing students to successfully transition to the Euro-NATO Joint Jet Pilot Training Program (ENJJPT), Specialized Undergraduate Pilot Training (SUPT), Undergraduate Helicopter Pilot Training (UHT), and Undergraduate Combat Systems Officer Training (UCSOT) at their associated air force bases, naval air stations, or army air field throughout the United States. The 45-acre (180,000 m^{2}) IFT campus is located immediately adjacent to the Pueblo Memorial Airport, Pueblo, Colorado.

A single-building facility provides for students’ general needs:

- Hotel-style doubles rooms with desks and dressers for personal belongings
- Gym with workout rooms, volleyball and basketball courts, weightlifting equipment and treadmills, cafeteria
- Small communal room (the Tiger Den)
- Large auditorium (used during the first week of training to teach students the basics of aviation)
- Classrooms where students study and meet with their instructor pilots before performing their graded flights.
