= Air Education and Training Command =

Command of the United States Air Force

- Shield of Air Education and Training Command
- Active: 22 January 1942 – present (84 years, 7 months) Detailed: 1 July 1993 – present (as Air Education and Training Command) 1 July 1946 – 1 July 1993 (as Air Training Command) 31 July 1943 – 1 July 1946 (as Army Air Forces Training Command) 15 March 1942 – 31 July 1943 (as Army Air Forces Flying Training Command) 22 January 1942 – 15 March 1942 (as Army Air Corps Flying Training Command)
- Country: United States of America
- Branch: United States Air Force (17 September 1947 – present); United States Army ( Army Air Forces, 7 July 1943 – 17 September 1947; Army Air Corps 23 January 1942 – 7 July 1943)
- Type: Major Command
- Role: "Find, recruit, train and educate the Airmen the nation needs."
- Size: 69,989 Airmen; 1,395 aircraft
- Headquarters: Randolph Air Force Base, Joint Base San Antonio, Texas, U.S.
- Nickname: "The First Command"
- Motto: "Airpower starts here!"
- Engagements: World War II – American Theater

- Decorations: Air Force Organization Excellence Award
- Website: www.aetc.af.mil

Commanders
- Commander: Lt Gen Clark J. Quinn
- Deputy Commander: Maj Gen Roy W. Collins
- Command Chief: CMSgt Chad W. Bickley

Aircraft flown
- Fighter: F-15C/D, F-16A/B/C/D, F-35A
- Multirole helicopter: HH-60G, UH-1N
- Trainer helicopter: TH-1H
- Reconnaissance: RC-26B
- Trainer: DA-20, T-1A, T-6A, T-38C, T-41, T-51, T-53A, TG-15A/B, TG-16A
- Transport: C-17A, C-130J, CV-22B, UV-18B
- Tanker: HC-130J/P/N, KC-46A, KC-135R, MC-130H/J/P

The Air Education and Training Command (AETC) is a major command (MAJCOM) of the United States Air Force (USAF), reporting to Headquarters, United States Air Force. It was established July 1, 1993, with the realignment of Air Training Command and Air University.

AETC is headquartered at Randolph Air Force Base, Joint Base San Antonio, Texas. AETC is the primary training and professional education command in the Air Force.

More than 48,000 active duty and Air Reserve Component members and 14,000 civilian personnel make up AETC. The command has responsibility for approximately 1,600 aircraft.

AETC's mission is to "recruit, train and educate Airmen to deliver air power for America".

== Air Force Recruiting Service ==
AETC's mission begins with the Air Force Recruiting Service (AFRS), an AETC activity also headquartered at Randolph AFB, Texas. AFRS comprises three regional groups and 24 squadrons with more than 1,400 commissioned officer and enlisted recruiters assigned throughout the United States, including territories Puerto Rico and Guam, as well as foreign countries England, Germany, and Japan. Recruiters in more than 1,000 offices worldwide recruit the young men and women needed as both enlisted airmen and commissioned officers to meet the demands of the U.S. Air Force.

AFRS recruitment of commissioned officers is limited to 4-year college/university graduates via Air Force Officer Training School (OTS). Individuals who desire to become commissioned USAF officers and enter the service via the U.S. Air Force Academy (USAFA) and Air Force ROTC (AFROTC) are not recruited by AFRS and are instead accessed via recruitment and application activities of USAFA and AFROTC, respectively.

== Basic military training and technical training ==
Second Air Force (2 AF), with headquarters at Keesler AFB, Mississippi, is responsible for conducting basic military and technical training for Air and Space Force enlisted members and technical training for non-flying missile launch officers, as well as support officers. The first stop for all Regular Air Force, Air National Guard and Air Force Reserve Command, as well as Space Force enlisted personnel is Basic Military Training (BMT) at Lackland AFB, Texas. More than 36,000 new Airmen and Guardians complete this recently lengthened eight-and-a-half-week program each year.

After completing BMT, Airmen and Guardians begin technical training in their career field specialties, primarily at five installations: Goodfellow AFB, Lackland AFB, and Sheppard AFB in Texas; Keesler AFB, Mississippi; and Vandenberg SFB, California. There are also several cross-service schools such as Defense Language Institute in Monterey, California and the U.S. Army CCBRN School at Fort Leonard Wood, Missouri that select USAF enlisted personnel will also attend. A recently established technical training institute at Fort Sam Houston, Texas, also conducts training in several medical career fields. Each base is responsible for a specific portion of formal technical training airmen require to accomplish the Air Force mission. Instructors conduct technical training in specialties such as aircraft maintenance, electronic principles, air transportation, civil engineering, medical services, computer systems, security forces, air traffic control, personnel, intelligence, fire fighting, weather forecasting and space and missile operations.

Commissioned officers not assigned to flight training as prospective pilots, combat systems officers or air battle managers attend technical training courses for similar career fields at the same locations.

2 AF also conducts specialized training for military working dogs and dog handlers at Lackland AFB, Texas, for the entire Department of Defense and the Federal Aviation Administration. Additionally, the Inter-American Air Forces Academy at Lackland AFB hosts more than 160 courses in aviation specialties, taught in Spanish, to students from 19 Western hemisphere countries.

== Flying training ==
When AETC was established in 1993, Nineteenth Air Force (19 AF) was also established as a companion numbered air force to 2 AF within AETC. While 2 AF focused on ground-based technical training, 19 AF focused on all undergraduate flying training and those formal training units (FTU) under its claimancy from 1993 until 2012, and again from 2014 to present. On 12 July 2012, 19 AF was temporarily inactivated for budgetary reasons in an effort to gain efficiencies. By 2014, these efficiencies had failed to materialize and the then-Commander of AETC, Gen Robin Rand, directed reestablishment of 19 AF effective 1 October 2014 for the oversight of all flight training operations under AETC's claimancy.

=== Pilot training ===
Air Force pilot candidates begin their flying careers with Initial Flight Training (IFT) at Pueblo Memorial Airport, Colorado. In IFT, civilian flight instructors working under contract to AETC and the command's 306th Flying Training Group (306 FTG) provide up to 25 hours of flight instruction to commissioned officer and enlisted student pilots accessed via the U.S. Air Force Academy, Air Force ROTC and Air Force OTS.

Following successful completion of IFS, student pilots attend either:

- Specialized Undergraduate Pilot Training (SUPT)
- Euro-NATO Joint Jet Pilot Training (ENJJPT)

==== Primary Training – SUPT ====
SUPT students accomplish primary training in the T-6A Texan II at one of three Air Force bases:

- Columbus AFB, Mississippi
- Laughlin AFB, Texas
- Vance AFB, Oklahoma

Between 1994 and 2013, SUPT was titled JSUPT for "Joint Specialized Undergraduate Pilot Training" and 100 USAF students annually accomplished primary training in the T-34C Turbomentor and later the T-6B Texan II with Training Air Wing FIVE at Naval Air Station Whiting Field, Florida via a combination of USN, USAF, USMC and USCG flight instructors while 80 USN and 20 USMC students annually accomplished primary training in the T-6A Texan II with the 71st Flying Training Wing at Vance Air Force Base. This program was terminated on 25 July 2013 with the graduation of the final USAF student pilot from primary training at NAS Whiting Field.

==== Primary Training – ENJJPT ====
ENJJPT students accomplish primary training in the T-6A Texan II at the following location:

- Sheppard AFB, Texas

The entire ENJJPT course lasts about 54 weeks and students learn with, and are taught by, officers of the U.S. Air Force and various European air forces. During the primary phase, students master contact, instrument, low-level and formation flying.

==== Advanced Training – Fighter/Bomber (ENJJPT + SUPT) ====
After the primary phase of SUPT and ENJJPT, student pilots select one of three advanced training tracks based on their class standing. Those qualified for fighter or bomber assignments are assigned to the fighter/bomber track and train in the T-38 Talon at the SUPT and ENJJPT bases. Following completion of the fighter/bomber track, graduates will be assigned to the A-10, F-15 Eagle, F-15E Strike Eagle, F-16, F-22 and F-35, B-1, B-2 or B-52.

NOTE: The U-2 is not an option for new graduates of the Fighter/Bomber track. Prospective U-2 pilots must be qualified in another fighter, bomber, reconnaissance or mobility aircraft before applying to fly the U-2. First Assignment Instructor Pilots (FAIPs) are also eligible to apply following their FAIP assignment.

==== Advanced Training – Airlift/Tanker (SUPT only) ====
Prospective airlift, tanker and "big wing" reconnaissance and special mission pilots are assigned to the airlift/tanker track and train in the T-1A Jayhawk at SUPT bases only. Following completion of the Airlift/Tanker track, graduates of this track will fly the C-5, C-17, C-21, C-130, AC-130, EC-130, HC-130, LC-130, MC-130, WC-130, KC-135, KC-46, E-3, and RC-135.

Prior to mid-2012, some USAF student pilots selected for the airlift/tanker track with specific assignment to the C-130 Hercules or its variants (special operations, electronic warfare, combat rescue, weather reconnaissance, etc.) were assigned to a multi-engine turboprop track flying the T-44 Pegasus and/or TC-12B Huron at NAS Corpus Christi, Texas in a cooperative arrangement between AETC and the Naval Air Training Command / Chief of Naval Air Training (CNATRA). These USAF students received instruction from a combination of USN, USAF, USMC and USCG flight instructors with Training Air Wing FOUR at NAS Corpus Christi. This program was discontinued in 2012 and all USAF student pilots slated for the C-130 and its variants now train in the T-1A at one of the three SUPT bases.

NOTE: The 55th Wing's (55 WG) E-4B National Air Operations Center (NAOC) aircraft and any of the Special Air Mission (SAM) aircraft operated by the 89th Airlift Wing (89 AW), e.g., VC-25/Air Force One, C-32, C-40, etc., are not options for new graduates of the Airlift/Tanker track. Prospective E-4 and VC-25/C-32/C-40 pilots must be qualified in an airlift, tanker, or other intelligence, surveillance and reconnaissance (ISR) aircraft before applying to fly the E-4 or any SAM aircraft.

==== Advanced Training – Helicopter (SUPT only) ====
Those selected to fly helicopters or tilt-rotor aircraft are assigned after completion of the primary phase to AETC's 23d Flying Training Squadron at Fort Rucker, Alabama to train in the TH-1H Huey. Graduates will fly the UH-1N Twin Huey, HH-60G Pave Hawk or CV-22 Osprey.

=== Combat Systems Officer Training ===
==== Undergraduate Combat Systems Officer Training – UCSOT ====
Previously known as Navigators, the training pipeline for Combat Systems Officers has seen significant change since AETC's establishment. When AETC was first activated to replace Air Training Command (ATC), it inherited ATC's modernization effort of navigator training in the midst of a BRAC-directed closure of Mather AFB, California and the inactivation of its 323d Flying Training Wing, USAF's sole Undergraduate Navigator Training (UNT) wing, which also provided advanced training for USN Student Naval Flight Officers destined for land-based naval aircraft (e.g., P-3 Orion, E-6 Mercury, etc.) under the dual-designation of Interservice Undergraduate Navigator Training (IUNT).

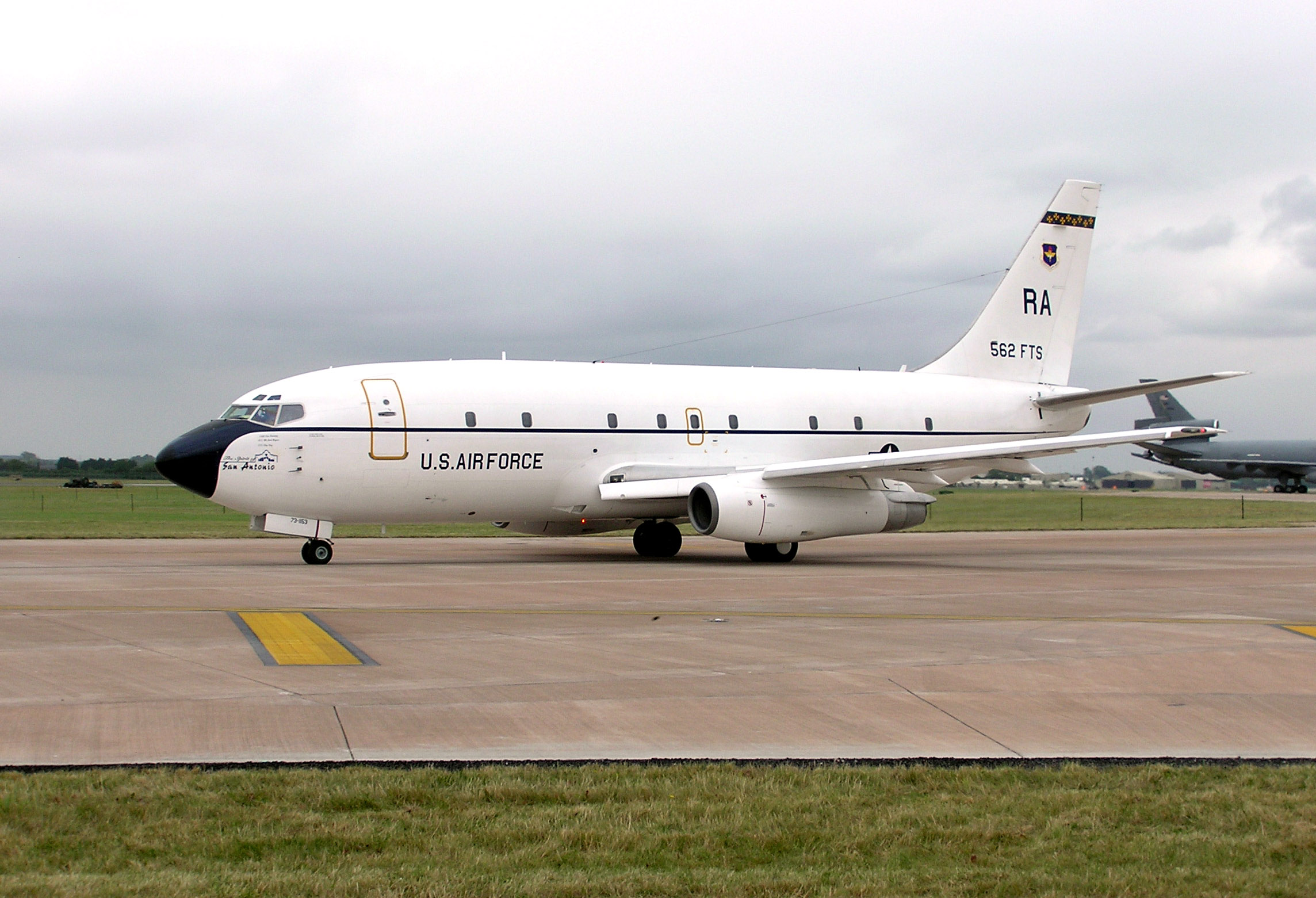
A T-43A of the 562d Flight Training Squadron taxiing at RAF Fairford, England

As part of this transition, AETC opted to implement a dual training track whereby most USAF and all land-based USN and NATO/Allied officer student navigator training would transition to the 12th Flying Training Wing (12 FTW) at Randolph AFB, Texas utilizing the T45 navigation simulator and flying the T-43 Bobcat (both relocated from Mather AFB) and adding the T-1 Jayhawk for USAF students. The relocated programs were renamed Specialized Undergraduate Navigator Training (SUNT) for USAF and USAF-sponsored NATO/Allied students, and Joint Specialized Undergraduate Navigator Training (JSUNT) for USN and USN-sponsored NATO/Allied students. USAF students graduating from SUNT were assigned to B-52, C-130, AC-130, EC-130, HC-130, LC-130, MC-130, WC-130, KC-135, E-3, E-8, RC-135 and OC-135 aircraft.

At the same time, a pre-selected cohort of USAF officer student navigators destined as weapon systems officers in the F-15E Strike Eagle, the B-1 Lancer, and, with the retirement of the EF-111 Raven, electronic warfare officers providing USAF manning of joint USN-USAF EA-6B Prowler squadrons, would complete a joint flight training program established between 19 AF and the Naval Air Training Command / Chief of Naval Air Training (CNATRA) with Training Air Wing SIX at Naval Air Station Pensacola, Florida. In this latter program, prospective USAF WSOs and EWOs would follow essentially the same training track as USN and USMC Student Naval Flight Officers destined for tactical fighter, strike and electronic attack aircraft, flying the T-34C Turbomentor in primary training until the T-34C's replacement by the T-6 Texan II, USAF T-1 Jayhawk aircraft on detached operations at NAS Pensacola, and USN/USMC T-39 Sabreliner aircraft in intermediate and advanced training under the tutelage of USN, USAF and USMC instructors.

In 2009, with the transition of all USAF Navigators to Combat Systems Officers, the merger of SUNT into Undergraduate Combat Systems Officer Training (UCSOT), and pursuant to additional BRAC directives, the 12 FTW established the 479th Flying Training Group (479 FTG) with two flying training squadrons and an operations support squadron as a geographically-separated unit (GSU) at Naval Air Station Pensacola, Florida.

Pursuant to USAF policy changes, AETC and CNATRA also discontinued joint training at Training Air Wing SIX with the establishment of the 479 FTG. Although NAS Pensacola remains the principal base for Student Naval Flight Officer (SNFO) training for the U.S. Navy, the 479 FTG operates independently of this program with its own USAF T-6 Texan II and T-1 Jayhawk aircraft. Upon establishment of the 479 FTG at NAS Pensacola, the remaining "legacy" navigator training squadrons that had relocated from the former Mather AFB to Randolph AFB in 1992 were inactivated and the remaining T-43 Bobcat aircraft retired.

Starting in the summer of 2010, following completion of Initial Flight Screening (IFS) at Pueblo Memorial Airport, Colorado with their USAF student pilot counterparts, all USAF CSO students undergo Undergraduate Combat Systems Officer Training (UCSOT) with the 479 FTG. Merging the three previous USAF Undergraduate Navigator Training (UNT) tracks formerly known as Navigator track, Weapon Systems Officer (WSO) track and Electronic Warfare Officer (EWO) track into one coherent training cycle, the first UCSOT class (11-01) under the new syllabus commenced training on 5 May 2010 and graduated on 15 April 2011. Today, USAF CSOs continue to fill all of the previously mentioned multi-place USAF combat aircraft with the exception that the USN has since retired all of its EA-6B Prowlers and the USAF now provides a few CSOs to four of the USN's thirteen Electronic Attack Squadrons flying the EA-18G Growler. Those four squadrons are land based and do not deploy aboard aircraft carriers.

=== Air Battle Manager Training ===
Air Battle Managers (ABM) are aircrew who operate mission systems in the E-3 Sentry "AWACS" and E-8 J-STARS and operate the ground based Control and Reporting Centers. Since October 1999, they have been considered "Aeronautically Rated Officers" on par with USAF pilots and CSOs. ABMs complete Undergraduate Air Battle Manager Training (UABMT) under AETC cognizance at Tyndall AFB, Florida that consists of a 6-9 month training syllabus with topics ranging from Radar Theory, Basic Aviation, The Continuum of Control (Close Control, Tactical Fluid Control, Broadcast Control, Advisory and Autonomous Control), Red Air (adversary aircraft capabilities) and Blue Air (joint and coalition aircraft capabilities) Academics, Electro-Magnetic Spectrum Academics, Air to Ground combat simulator, Large Force Employment simulators and culminating with live Air to Air control with Fighter Squadrons along the East Coast/Gulf of Mexico. The syllabus also includes 6 training sorties in the MU-2 Peacock. As of May 2010, a new training syllabus at Tyndall AFB allows ABMs to receive their wings at the conclusion of UABMT, finally bringing their undergraduate flight training in line with pilots and CSOs. Follow-on simulator and flying training in the E-3 or E-8 aircraft takes place under the cognizance of Air Combat Command at Tinker AFB, Oklahoma with the 966th Airborne Air Control Squadron and Robins AFB, Georgia, with the 330 Combat Training Squadron respectively. ABMs also receive their follow on simulator and live control training for the CRC at Luke AFB, AZ with the 607th Air Control Squadron.

=== Enlisted Aircrew Training ===
AETC also provides enlisted aircrew training for a wide variety of aircrew specialties including flight engineers, air-to-air refueling boom operators, loadmasters, aerial gunners, and airborne communications specialists as follows:

- Flight engineers, loadmasters, other aircrew (C-130, EC-130, LC-130, WC-130) – Little Rock AFB
- Flight engineers, loadmasters, other aircrew (AC-130, MC-130, HC-130) – Little Rock AFB and Kirtland AFB
- Flight engineers, aerial gunners, other aircrew (CV-22, HH-60, UH-1) – Kirtland AFB
- Aerial refueling boom operators (KC-46, KC-135) – Altus AFB
- Loadmasters (C-5) – Lackland AFB / Kelly Field Annex
- Loadmasters (C-17) – Altus AFB
- Airborne communications specialists (various aircraft) – Lackland AFB
- RPA Sensor Operator – Randolph AFB

=== Formal Training Unit ===
Air Education and Training Command also provides follow-on training for most Air Force pilots, CSOs and enlisted aircrew in their assigned aircraft via Formal Training Units (FTUs). For those pilots and CSOs selected for assignment to fighter aircraft, they will complete the Introduction to Fighter Fundamentals (IFF) course, an AETC-administered program, at Randolph AFB, Texas, Columbus AFB, Mississippi, or Sheppard AFB, Texas, shortly following completion of undergraduate flying training and prior to reporting to their FTU. At IFF, pilots fly the AT-38B Talon. Until 2026, AETC hosted FTUs for some fighter and remotely-piloted aircraft, including the F-15C, F-16, F-35, and MQ-9. However, their training became the responsibility of Air Combat Command's Fifteenth Air Force, including ACC-gainable Air National Guard units in July of 2026 as a reorganization of combat aircraft training.

- Air Education and Training Command FTUs:
  - C-5 Galaxy – Lackland AFB/Kelly Field Annex (former Kelly AFB)
    - Training conducted by an AETC-gained airlift wing of the Air Force Reserve Command; this unit trains Air Force and Air Force Reserve personnel for the C-5 and previously trained Air National Guard personnel for the C-5 until retirement of the C-5 from the ANG
  - C-17 Globemaster III – Altus AFB, Oklahoma
  - C-21 Learjet – Keesler AFB, Mississippi
  - C-130 Hercules – Little Rock AFB, Arkansas
  - KC-135 Stratotanker – Altus AFB, Oklahoma
  - KC-46 Pegasus – Altus AFB, Oklahoma
  - MC-130J Commando II and HC-130J Combat King II – Kirtland AFB, New Mexico
  - UH-1N Twin Huey – Kirtland AFB, New Mexico
  - HH-60G Pave Hawk and HH-60W Jolly Green II – Kirtland AFB, New Mexico
  - CV-22 Osprey – Kirtland AFB, Mexico
  - T-6 Texan II, T-38 Talon and T-1 Jayhawk Pilot Instructor Training (PIT) – Randolph AFB, Texas

FTUs not under AETC claimancy are:

- Air Combat Command
  - A-10 Thunderbolt II
  - F-15C/D Eagle
  - F-15E Strike Eagle
  - F-15EX Eagle II
  - F-16 Fighting Falcon
  - F-22 Raptor
  - F-35 Lightning II
  - E-3 Sentry
  - E-4 NAOC
  - EC-130 Hercules (Compass Call)
  - RC-135 Rivet Joint
  - U-2 Dragon Lady
  - MQ-9 Reaper
  - RQ-170 Sentinel
  - RQ-180
- Air Force Global Strike Command
  - B-1 Lancer
  - B-2 Spirit
  - B-52 Stratofortress
- Air Force Special Operations Command
  - AC-130J Ghostrider
  - EC-130 (Commando Solo)
  - U-28
- Air Mobility Command
  - C-20 Gulfstream IV
  - C-21 Learjet
  - VC-25
  - C-40 Clipper
  - C-32
  - C-37 Gulfstream V

== Air University ==
Air University (AU), headquartered at Maxwell AFB, Alabama, conducts professional military education (PME), graduate education and professional continuing education for officers, senior enlisted members and DoD and DAFC civilians throughout their careers.

=== USAF Commissioned Officer Accession & Training ===
Air University also has responsibility for all Air Force officer accession and training other than those officers accessed and commissioned the United States Air Force Academy (USAFA). This is conducted via AU's subordinate activity, the Jeanne M. Holm Center for Officer Accessions and Citizen Development (Holm Center), formerly the Air Force Officer Accession and Training Schools (AFOATS).

As an AU activity, the Holm Center oversees both the Air Force Reserve Officer Training Corps (AFROTC), with detachments at numerous colleges and universities across the United States, and the Air Force Officer Training School (OTS) at Maxwell AFB, Alabama.

=== Professional Military Education (PME) and Graduate and Continuing Education ===
Air University's professional military education schools prepare students from the Air Force, its sister services and both NATO and other U.S.-allied nations as they progress through their careers. Emphasis in these programs includes leadership, military doctrine and air power.

The three primary PME schools are:

- Squadron Officer School (SOS), an approximately two-month leadership development program primarily for USAF company grade officers (First Lieutenants (O-2) and Captains (O-3)); attendance is also open to US civil service (primarily DAFC) in grades GS-11 and GS-12
- Air Command and Staff College (ACSC), an approximately year long joint "intermediate" service college program for officers of all services in the rank of (or selected for) Major (O-4), Lieutenant Commander (O-4) in the Navy and Coast Guard, other Allied military equivalents, or US civil service GS-13, primarily DAFC, DoD, DHS and NASA
- USAF Air War College (AWC), an approximately year long joint "senior" service college program for officers in the rank of (or selected for) Lieutenant Colonel (O-5), Commander (O-5) in the Navy and Coast Guard, other Allied military equivalents, or US civil service GS-14. Officers in the grade of Colonel (O-6), Captain (O-6) in the Navy and Coast Guard, and US civil service GS-15 (primarily DAFC, DoD, DHS and NASA) may also attend AWC in residence, although this is usually due to previous completion of AWC via correspondence or seminar, career timing, or early promotion.

Air University oversees the Air Force Institute of Technology (AFIT), the Air Force's primary institution for graduate and continuing education. Approximately 700 full-time students, most of whom are Air Force and Space Force officers, pursue both master of science and doctor of philosophy degrees through the institute's Graduate School of Education and Management. The School of Systems and Logistics, the Civil Engineer School, and the School of Strategic Force Studies provides opportunities for acquisition management, logistics management, civil engineering, and nuclear and cyber professional and continuing education.

=== Air Force Junior ROTC ===
Air University also oversees one of Air Force's two civilian participatory programs, Air Force Junior ROTC. Civil Air Patrol was moved under Air Combat Command in 2016:

- The Air Force Junior ROTC program is a cadet program for high school students at more than 870 high schools in the United States and at Department of Defense Dependent Schools (DoDDS) locations overseas. AFJROTC Instructors are retired USAF officers in the ranks of Major, Lieutenant Colonel and Colonel, assisted by retired USAF non-commissioned officers in the ranks of Technical Sergeant through Chief Master Sergeant.
  - As opposed to its college/university counterpart, Air Force ROTC (AFROTC), the AFJROTC program is not a military pre-commissioning program for prospective USAF officers, but is instead a citizenship program for youth similar to, but with an overall narrower age range than, the Civil Air Patrol Cadet Program.

AFJROTC are subordinate to the Jeanne M. Holm Center for Officer Accessions and Citizen Development (Holm Center).

Other academic support services at Air University include the Academic Instructor School, the Air Force Public Affairs Center of Excellence, the Muir S. Fairchild Research Information Center (formerly known as Air University Library) and the International Officer School.

== Bases ==
AETC has claimancy and oversight of the following installations:

- Altus AFB, OK
- Columbus AFB, MS
- Goodfellow AFB, TX
- Holloman AFB, NM
- Keesler AFB, MS
- Joint Base San Antonio, TX
  - JBSA-Lackland
  - JBSA-Randolph
  - JBSA-Fort Sam Houston
- Laughlin AFB, TX
- Maxwell-Gunter AFB, AL
- Sheppard AFB, TX
- Vance AFB, OK

AETC is also a major tenant at Kirtland AFB, NM; Little Rock AFB, AR; NAS Pensacola, FL; and Vandenberg SFB, CA.

== Units ==
- Wings
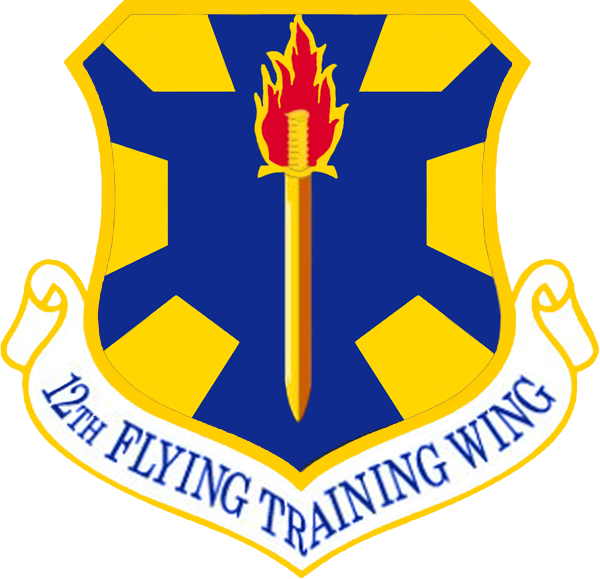
  - 12th Flying Training Wing
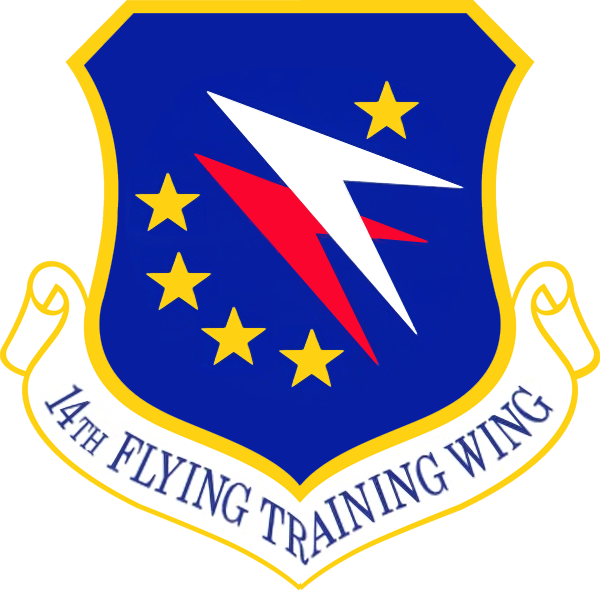
  - 14th Flying Training Wing
  - 17th Training Wing
  - 37th Training Wing
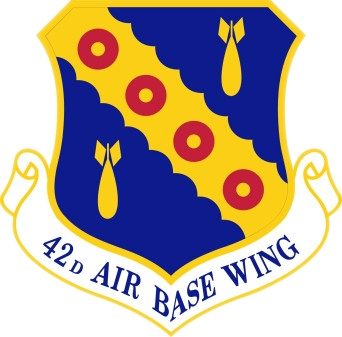
  - 42d Air Base Wing
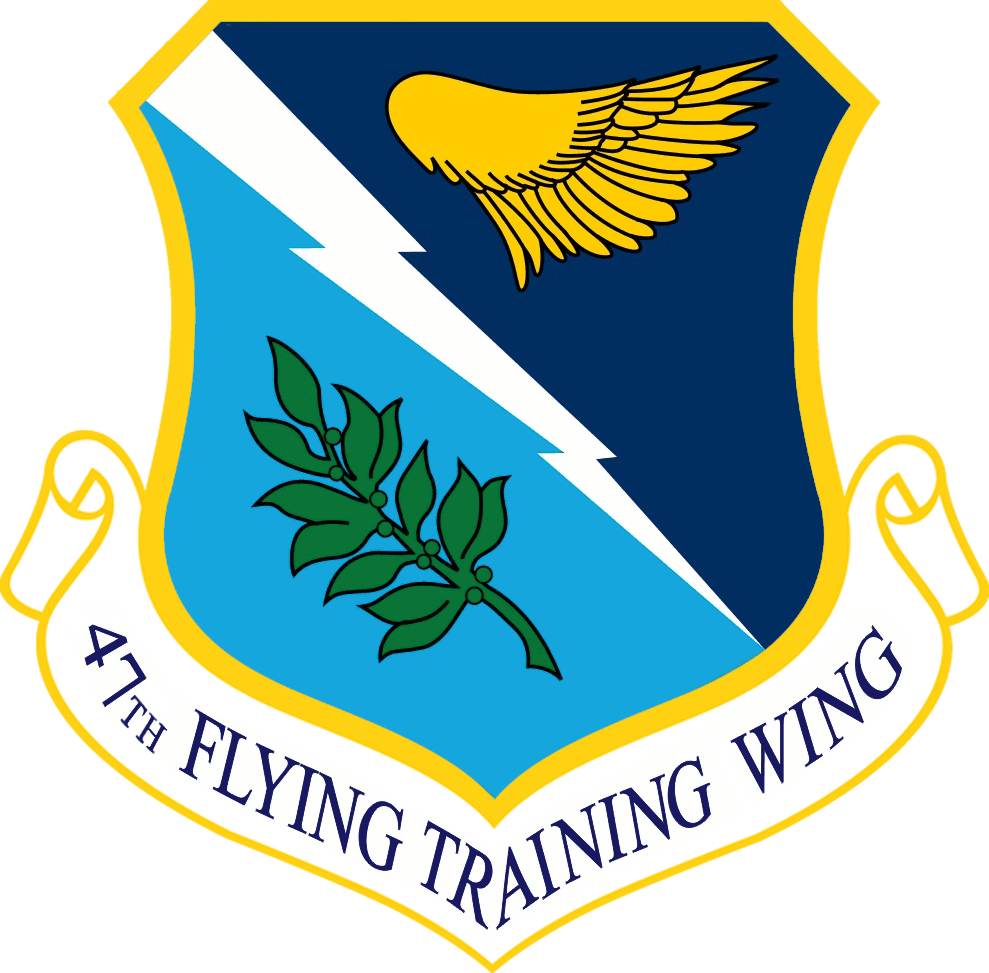
  - 47th Flying Training Wing
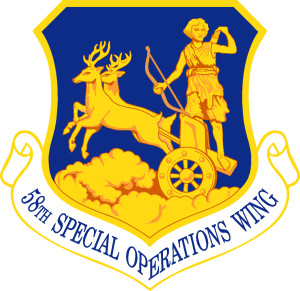
  - 58th Special Operations Wing
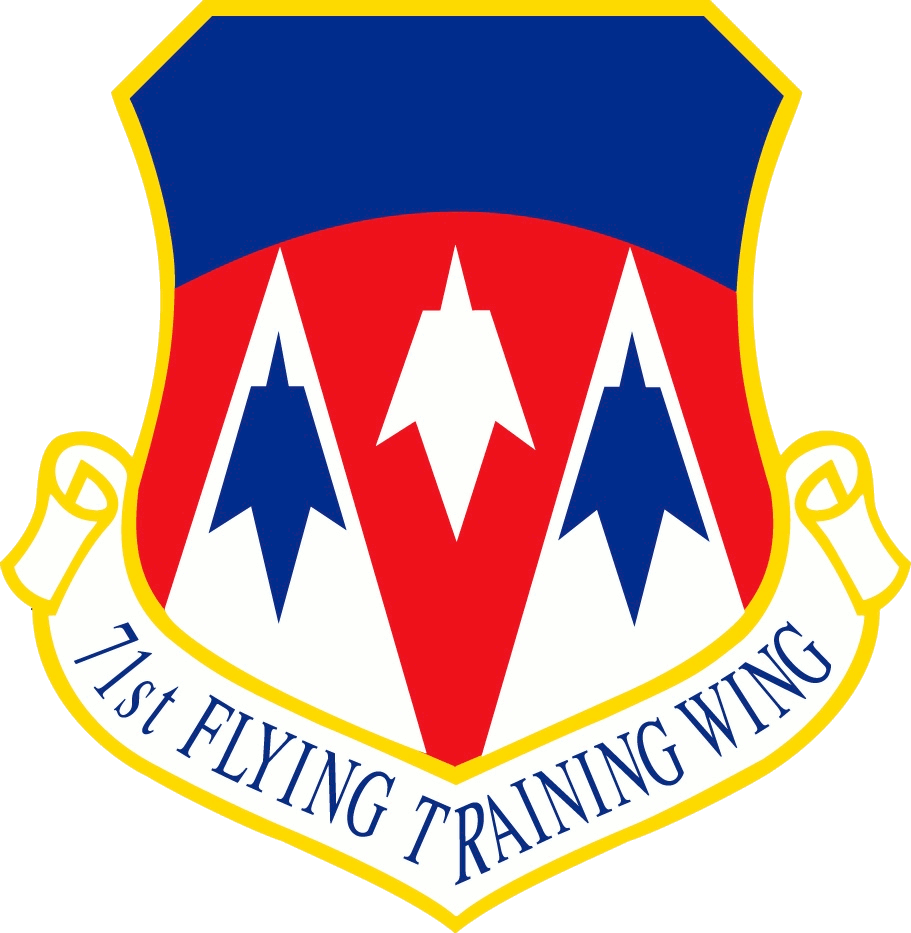
  - 71st Flying Training Wing
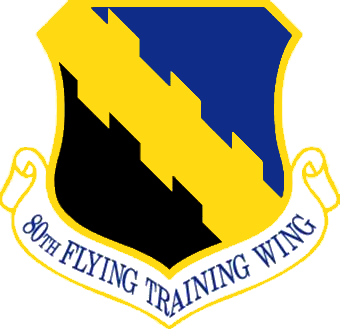
  - 80th Flying Training Wing
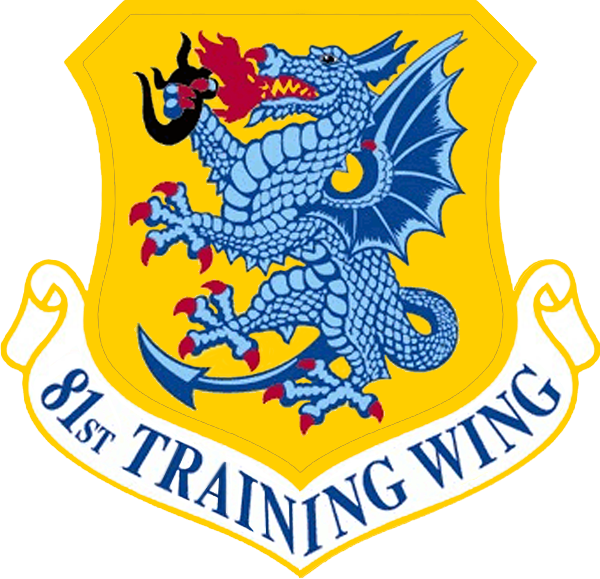
  - 81st Training Wing
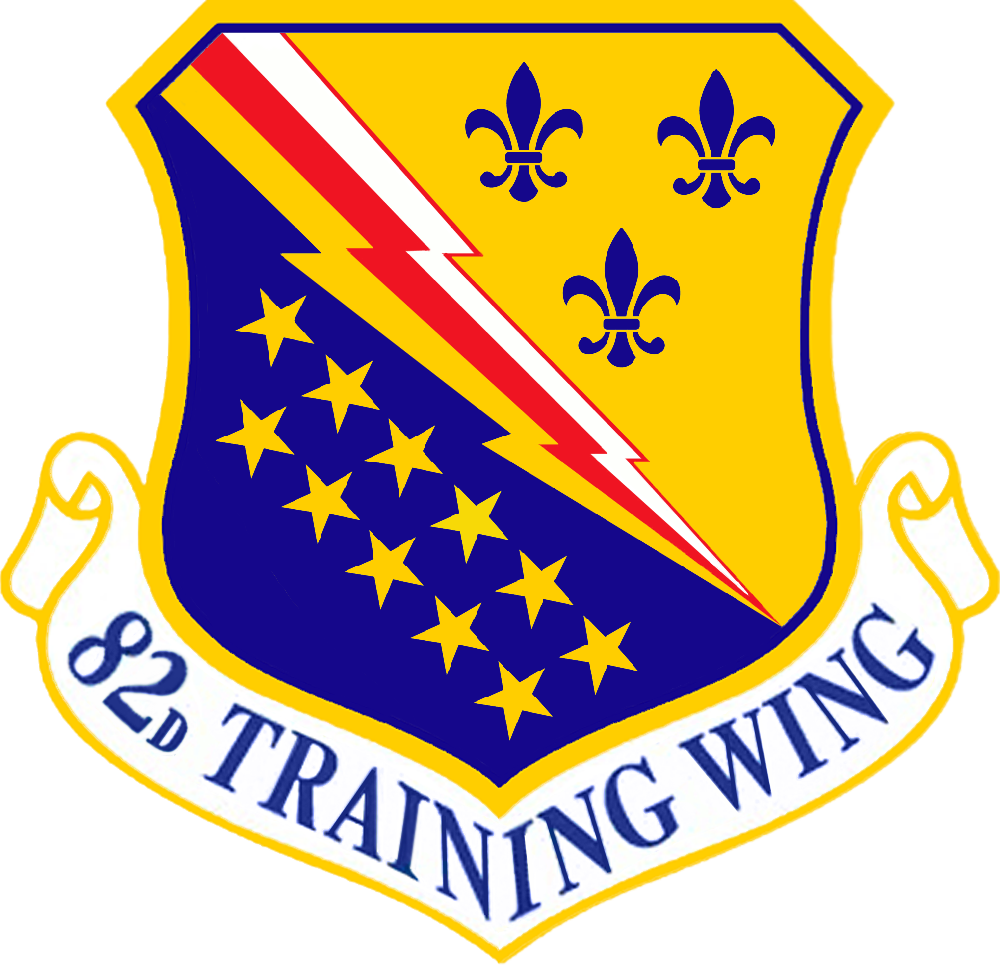
  - 82d Training Wing
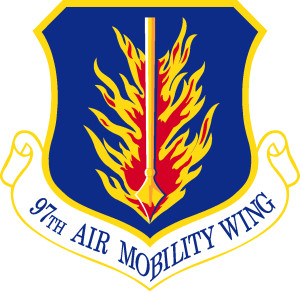
  - 97th Air Mobility Wing
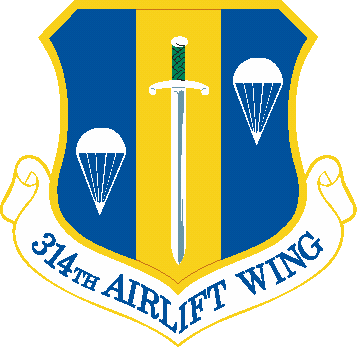
  - 314th Airlift Wing
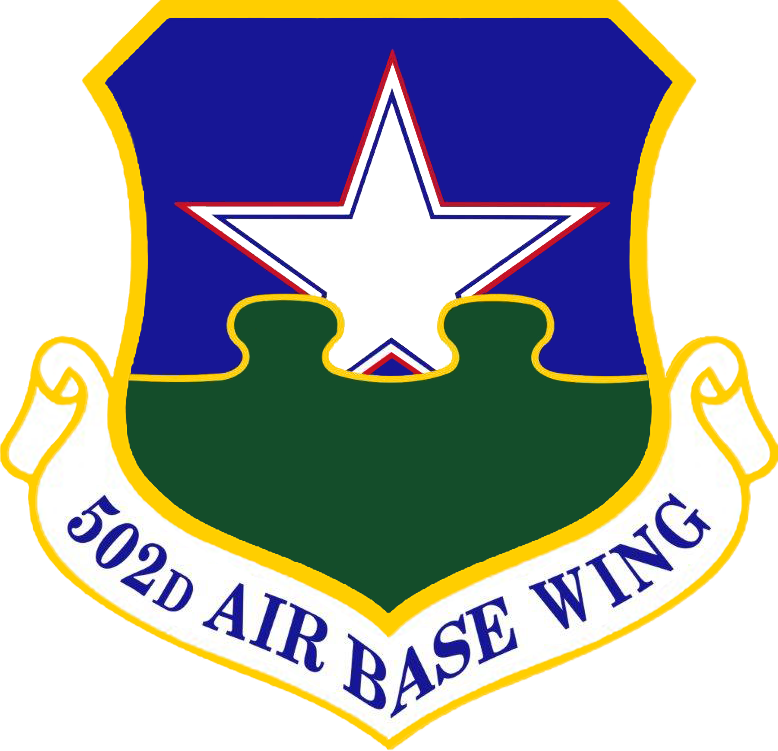
  - 502d Air Base Wing
- Groups
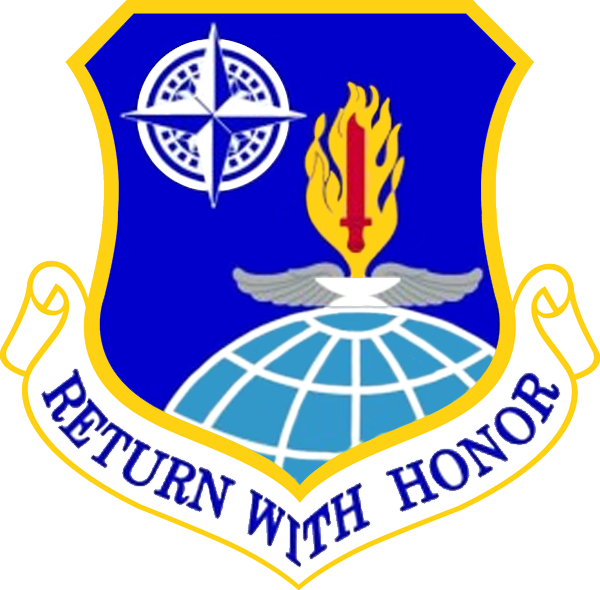
  - 336th Training Group

== History ==
For a history prior to 1993, see Air Training Command

On 1 January 1993, Air Training Command absorbed Air University and changed the command designation to Air Education and Training Command (AETC). AETC assumed responsibilities for both aspects of career development: training and education. Missions such as combat crew training, pararescue, and combat controller training, and (later) space training transferred to the new command, so that airmen would report to their operational units mission ready.

Restructuring the command assumed priority among the issues facing the command staff. The introduction of three new training aircraft, the Raytheon T-1 Jayhawk, Slingsby T-3 Firefly, and Beech T-6 Texan II (JPATS); the addition of joint training; and the BRAC-mandated closures of Chanute AFB, Illinois (a major technical training center); Mather AFB, California (previously USAF's sole Undergraduate Navigator Training base) and Williams AFB, Arizona (an Undergraduate Pilot Training base) were major challenges following the establishment of AETC.

In 1994, AETC adopted the Objective Wing Concept and stood up several wings responsible for crew training in the F-15, F-16, special operations aircraft, airlift aircraft, the KC-135 aerial refueling aircraft, and space and missile operations. AETC also began the first Specialized Undergraduate Pilot Training (SUPT) and Joint-SUPT courses.

Lowry AFB, Colorado, a technical training center with closed runways that, like the previously closed Chanute AFB, no longer conducted flight operations but conducted both non-flying officer and enlisted technical training, was added to the list of AETC bases closed by the Base Realignment and Closure Commission (BRAC) in the mid-1990s. This was followed by the BRAC mandated closure of Reese AFB, Texas, an Undergraduate Pilot Training base, in 1995. The transition to SUPT was completed in 1996, the delivery of the first JPATS aircraft in 1999, and the discontinuation of the controversial T-3 as an initial flight screening aircraft in 2000 following a higher than average fatal mishap record.

In response to the terrorist attacks on 11 September 2001, AETC went on a war footing, activating a Crisis Action Team and supplying both fighters and tankers from its wings for combat air patrols in American airspace as part of Operation Noble Eagle. An operational test and evaluation of JPATS began in 2002 at Moody AFB and upgrades to its Training Integration Management System (TIMS) were begun the next year, resulting in retirement of the T-37 Tweet and full implementation of JPATS with the T-6 Texan II in 2007.

== List of Commanders ==
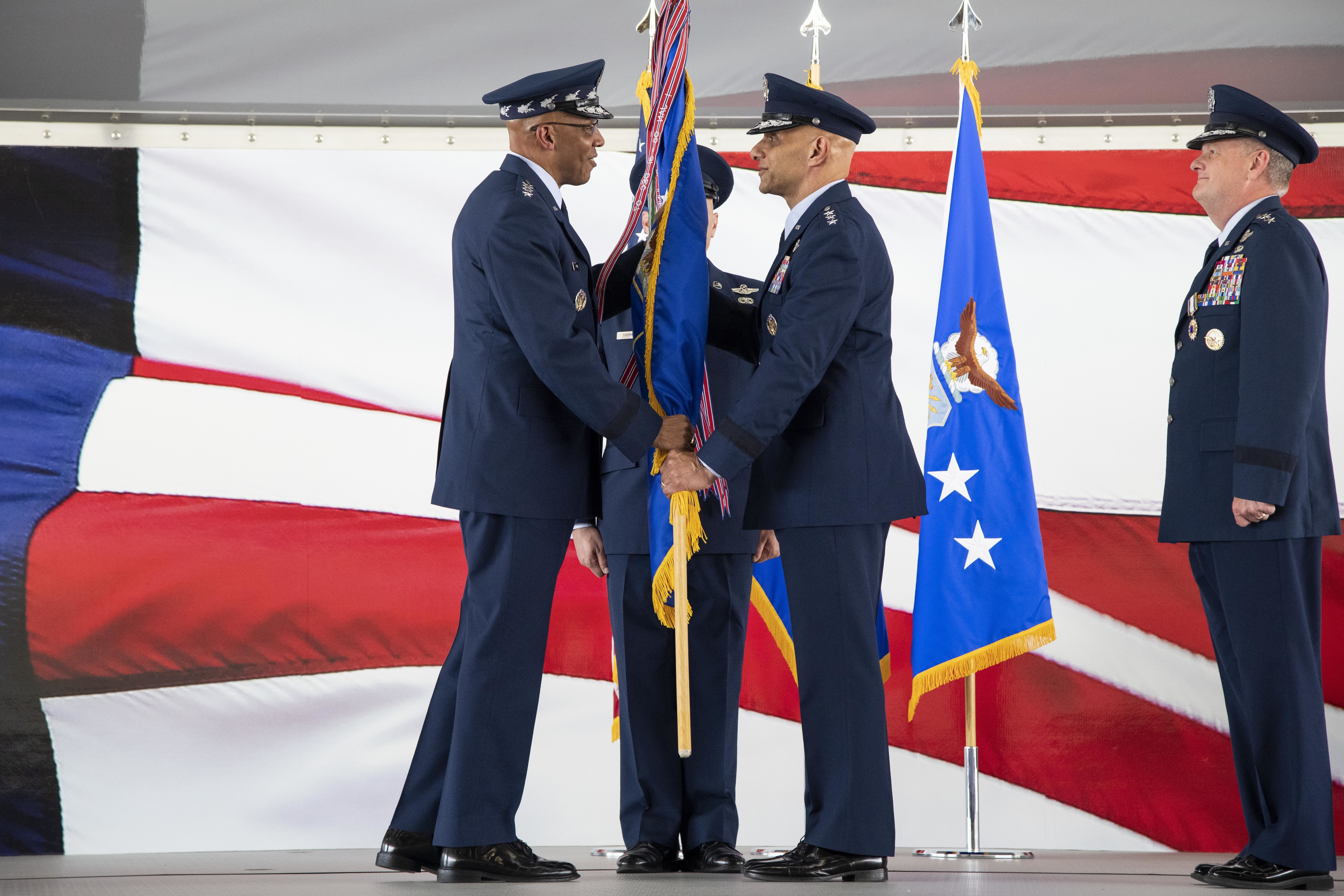
Lt Gen Brian S. Robinson receives the AETC command guidon from Air Force chief of staff General Charles Q. Brown Jr. on May 20, 2022.

No.	Commander		Term		
No.	Portrait	Name	Took office	Left office	Term length
1	Henry Viccellio Jr.	General; Henry Viccellio Jr.	11 December 1992	20 June 1995	2 years, 191 days
2	Billy J. Boles	General; Billy J. Boles	20 June 1995	17 March 1997	1 year, 270 days
3	Lloyd W. Newton	General; Lloyd W. Newton	17 March 1997	22 June 2000	3 years, 97 days
4	Hal M. Hornburg	General; Hal M. Hornburg	22 June 2000	10 November 2001	1 year, 141 days
–	John D. Hopper Jr.	Lieutenant General; John D. Hopper Jr. Acting	10 November 2001	15 December 2001	35 days
5	Donald G. Cook	General; Donald G. Cook	15 December 2001	17 June 2005	3 years, 184 days
6	William R. Looney III	General; William R. Looney III	17 June 2004	2 July 2008	4 years, 15 days
7	Stephen R. Lorenz	General; Stephen R. Lorenz	2 July 2008	17 November 2010	2 years, 138 days
8	Edward A. Rice Jr.	General; Edward A. Rice Jr.	17 November 2010	10 October 2013	2 years, 327 days
9	Robin Rand	General; Robin Rand	10 October 2013	21 July 2015	1 year, 284 days
10	Darryl L. Roberson	Lieutenant General; Darryl L. Roberson	21 July 2015	16 November 2017	2 years, 118 days
11	Steven L. Kwast	Lieutenant General; Steven L. Kwast	16 November 2017	26 July 2019	1 year, 252 days
12	Marshall B. Webb	Lieutenant General; Marshall B. Webb	26 July 2019	20 May 2022	2 years, 298 days
13	Brian S. Robinson	Lieutenant General; Brian S. Robinson	20 May 2022	31 October 2025	3 years, 164 days
14	Clark Quinn	Lieutenant General; Clark Quinn	31 October 2025	Incumbent	315 days

== Lineage ==
- Established as Air Corps Flying Training Command on 23 January 1942
- Redesignated as Army Air Forces Flying Training Command on or about 15 March 1942
- Redesignated as Army Air Forces Training Command on 31 July 1943
- Redesignated as Air Training Command (ATC) on 1 July 1946
- Redesignated as Air Education and Training Command (AETC) on 1 July 1993

== See also ==
- AETC Studies and Analysis

U.S. Armed Forces training and education commands

- Army Training and Doctrine Command
- Marine Corps Training and Education Command
- Naval Education and Training Command
- Space Training and Readiness Command

== Bibliography ==
- Manning, Thomas A (2005). History of Air Education and Training Command, 1942–2002. Randolph Air Force Base, Tex. : Office of History and Research, Headquarters, Air Education and Training Command.
