= John Hopper =

John Hopper may refer to:

- John Hopper (politician) (John D. Hopper) (1923–1996), member of the Pennsylvania State Senate
- John Hopper (epidemiologist) (1950–2024), Australian genetic epidemiologist and professor
- John D. Hopper Jr. (born 1946), United States Air Force general

== See also ==
- John Hopper House, in Hackensack, Bergen County, New Jersey, United States
- John Hopper Mathews (1926–2015), American and Osage Nation actor, professor, and research scientist
- John Hoppner (1758–1810), English portrait painter
