= Joppen =

Joppen is a Dutch surname. Notable people with the surname include:

- Egon Joppen (1926–2018), German chess master
- Guus Joppen (born 1989), Dutch professional footballer

== See also ==
- Hoppen
