= Allan Hopper =

Allan Hopper may refer to:

- Alan Hopper, English footballer
- Allan Hopper, character in 2 Days in the Valley
