= Petro-Canada =

Canadian oil company

- Type: Subsidiary
- Industry: Petroleum
- Founded: 30 July 1975
- Defunct: 1 August 2009
- Fate: Acquired by Suncor
- Headquarters: Petro-Canada Centre, Calgary, Alberta
- Parent: Suncor Energy
- Website: www.petro-canada.ca

Petro-Canada is a retail and wholesale marketing brand subsidiary of Suncor Energy. Until 1991, it was a federal Crown corporation (a state-owned enterprise). In August 2009, Petro-Canada merged with Suncor Energy, with Suncor shareholders receiving approximately 60 percent ownership of the combined company and Petro-Canada shareholders receiving approximately 40 percent. The company retained the Suncor Energy name for the merged corporation and its upstream operations. It continues to use the Petro-Canada name nationwide.

== History ==
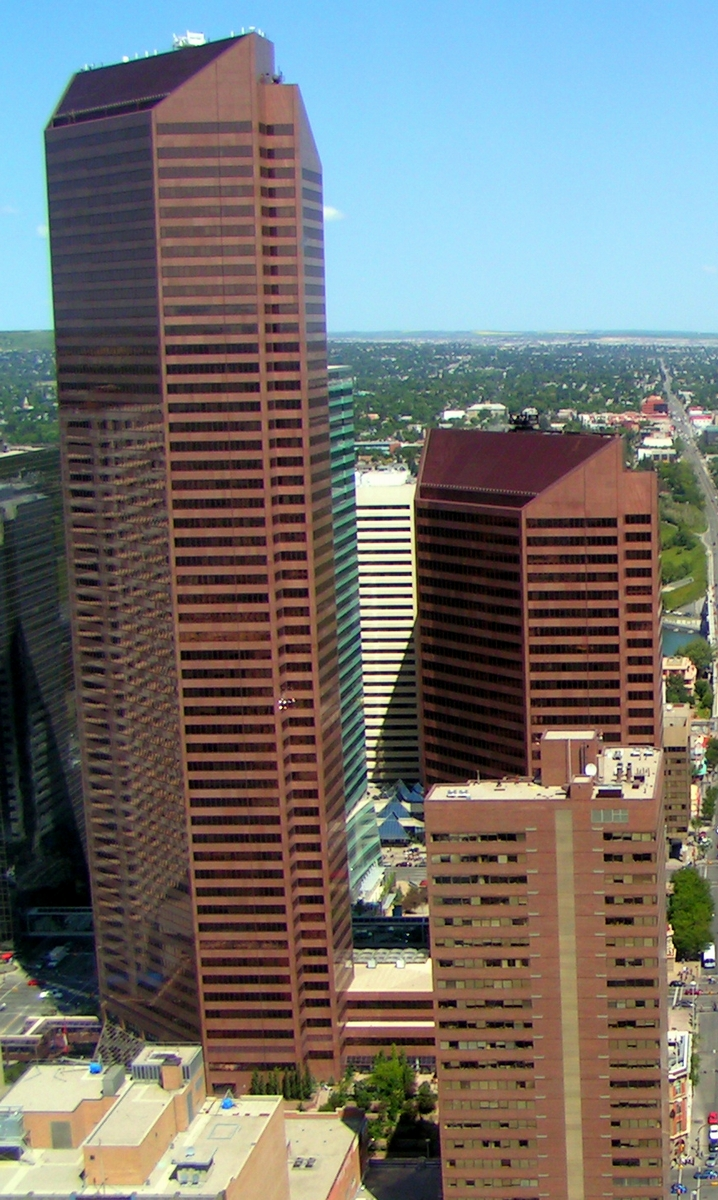
Petro-Canada headquarters in Calgary

=== Founding ===
In 1973, world oil prices quadrupled due to the Arab oil embargo following the Yom Kippur War. The province of Alberta had substantial oil reserves, whose extraction had long been controlled by American corporations. The government of Canada Prime Minister Pierre Trudeau and the opposition New Democratic Party felt that these corporations geared most of their production to the American market, and as a result, little of the benefit of rising oil prices went to Canadians. During debates in the House of Commons, for example, Tommy Douglas supported the new Crown Corporation by saying: "It should be remembered that the people of Canada have paid billions of dollars to enlarge and enrich foreign oil companies, and only now, belatedly, are we setting up an economic vehicle to develop our petroleum resources for the benefit of Canadians."

Trudeau's Liberals were then in a minority government and dependent upon the support of the NDP to stay in power. The idea also fit with the growing movement toward economic nationalism within the Liberals. The Liberals and NDP passed the bill over the opposition of the Progressive Conservative Party led by Robert Stanfield.

=== Crown Corporation (1975–1991) ===
Petro-Canada was founded as a Crown Corporation in 1975 by an act of Parliament. It started its operations on 1 January 1976. The company was given C$1.5 billion in start-up money and easy access to new sources of capital. It was set up in Calgary, despite the hostility of existing oil firms. Its first president was Maurice Strong. The Progressive Conservatives (PCs), then led by Albertan Joe Clark, were opponents of the company, and advocated breaking it up and selling it. However, they were unable to proceed with these plans during their brief time in power in 1979–80.

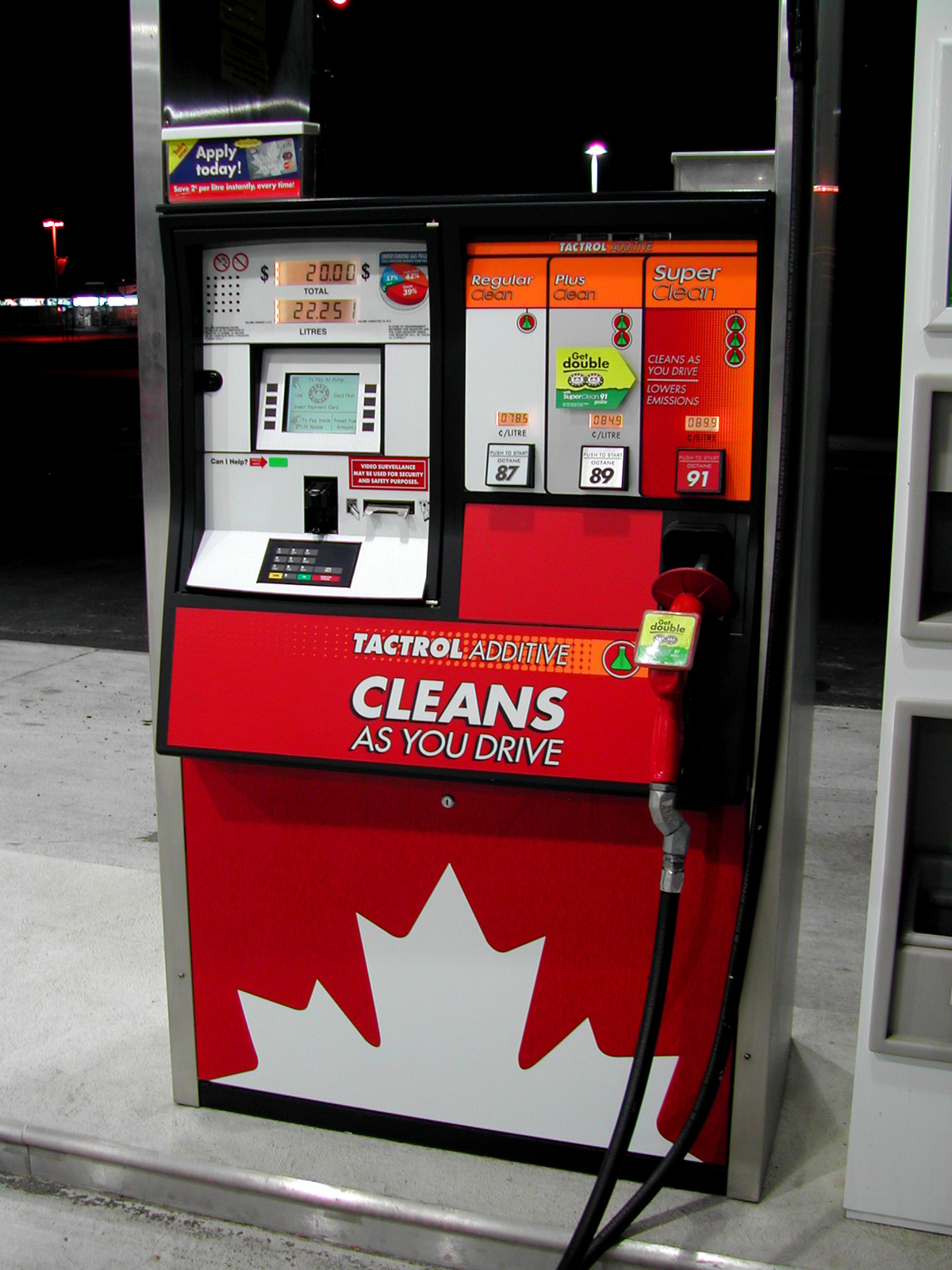
Petro-Canada Fuel Pump

With the establishment of Petro-Canada, the federal government transferred its 45% stake in Panarctic Oils Ltd. and its 12% stake in Syncrude to the newly established company. In 1976, Petro-Canada purchased Atlantic Richfield Canada, in 1978 Pacific Petroleums, and in 1981 the Canadian operations of Petrofina. Most of the original Petro-Canada refineries and service stations were acquired from BP Canada in 1983.

The company became popular outside of Alberta as a symbol of Canadian nationalism. It quickly grew to become one of the largest players in the traditional oil fields of the west as well as in the oil sands and the East coast offshore oil fields.

When the Liberals returned to power in 1980, energy policy was an important focus, and the sweeping National Energy Program was created. This expanded Petro-Canada, but was seen as detrimental to Alberta's economy. The PC government of Prime Minister Brian Mulroney (1984–1993) stopped using Petro-Canada as a policy tool (also abandoning the National Energy Program with it), and it began to compete fully and successfully with the private sector companies while abandoning its founding principles of economic nationalism.

=== Private, Independent Company (1991–2009) ===
In 1990, the Mulroney government announced its intention to privatize Petro-Canada, and the first shares were sold on the open market in July 1991 at $13 each. The government began to slowly sell its majority control, but kept a 19% stake in the company. No other shareholder was allowed to own more than 10%, however. Also, foreigners could not control more than 25% of the company.

During the first year, the value of the shares gradually dropped to $8 as Petro-Canada suffered a loss of $603 million, primarily because of the devaluation of some assets. The newly private company significantly reduced the number of properties in which it had a direct interest. It reduced its annual operating costs by $300 million and it went from a staff of close to 11,000 to only about 5,000 employees. Many of these laid-off employees went on to work and start up other oil companies in Alberta, creating a new group of Canadian producers. But many did not work in other oil companies and some left Alberta to find work elsewhere.

In his 2004 federal budget, Finance Minister Ralph Goodale pledged to sell the government's remaining stake in the company; by the end of the year it had sold its 19% stake, 49 million shares in all, for net proceeds of $3.2 billion. As of June 2007, the company's largest shareholders were Capital Research and Management Company (a Capital Group company), with 7.3%, and Barclays, with 4%.

=== Subsidiary of Suncor (2009–present) ===
On March 23, 2009, Suncor Energy announced its intent to acquire Petro-Canada, which would form a company with a combined market capitalization of C$43.3 billion. Suncor planned to rebrand its existing Sunoco-branded retail operations in Ontario under the Petro-Canada name following the completion of the acquisition.

The sale was approved by shareholders in June 2009, and completed on August 1, 2009. As a condition of the purchase, Suncor was required to divest some of its retail outlets. In December 2009, 98 Suncor-owned gas stations in Ontario (68 Sunoco and 30 Petro-Canada) were sold to Husky Energy.

== Operations ==
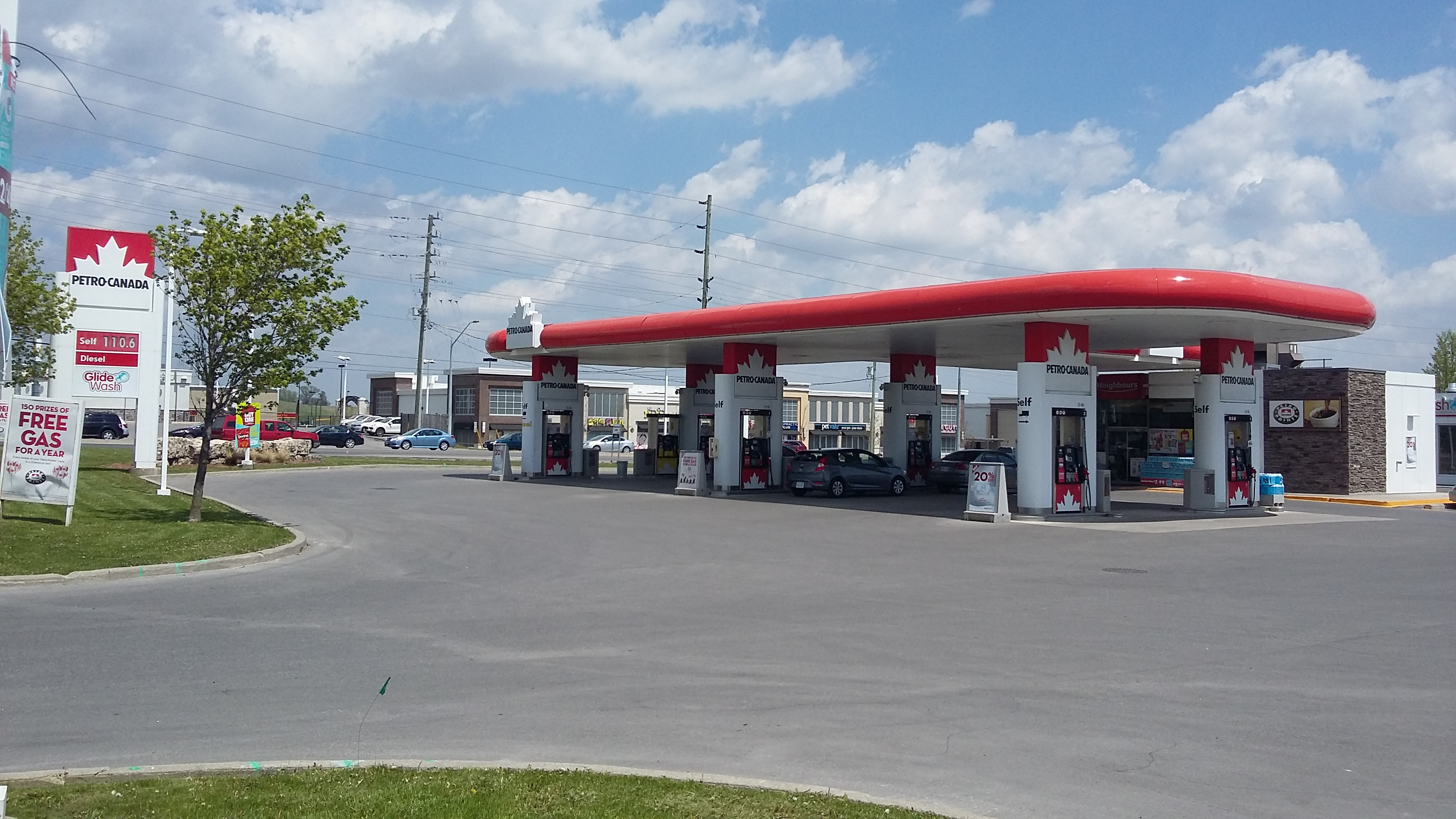
A Petro-Canada filling station in Newmarket, Ontario, with a Neighbours convenience store.

As of 2008, Petro-Canada was Canada's 11th largest company and the second-largest downstream company, with important interests in such projects as Hibernia, Terra Nova, and White Rose; its gas stations remained a presence in most Canadian cities. It owned refineries in Edmonton, Alberta (135,000 bpd) and Montreal, Quebec (160,000 bpd), accounting for 16% of the Canadian industry's total refining capacity. All these facilities are currently run by Suncor.

Petro-Canada had a lubricants plant in Mississauga, Ontario, but Suncor sold the unit to HollyFrontier in late 2016.

At one time, the company had international operations in Algeria, the Netherlands, Tunisia, the United Kingdom, Syria, Italy, Libya, Trinidad and Tobago, Venezuela, Morocco and Norway. These sites outside of North America were run by the International and Offshore Business Unit of Petro-Canada with its headquarters in London. This was the largest business unit, and much of its assets were part of the former Veba Oel company based in Essen, Germany.

In January 2019, Petro-Canada installed electric vehicle charging stations at one of their gas stations in Milton, Ontario, making it the company's first EV chargers. The following month, Suncor announced that it would develop a national network of charging stations serving the Trans-Canada Highway.

=== Retail ===
A Petro-Canada station in Toronto operated by 7-Eleven.

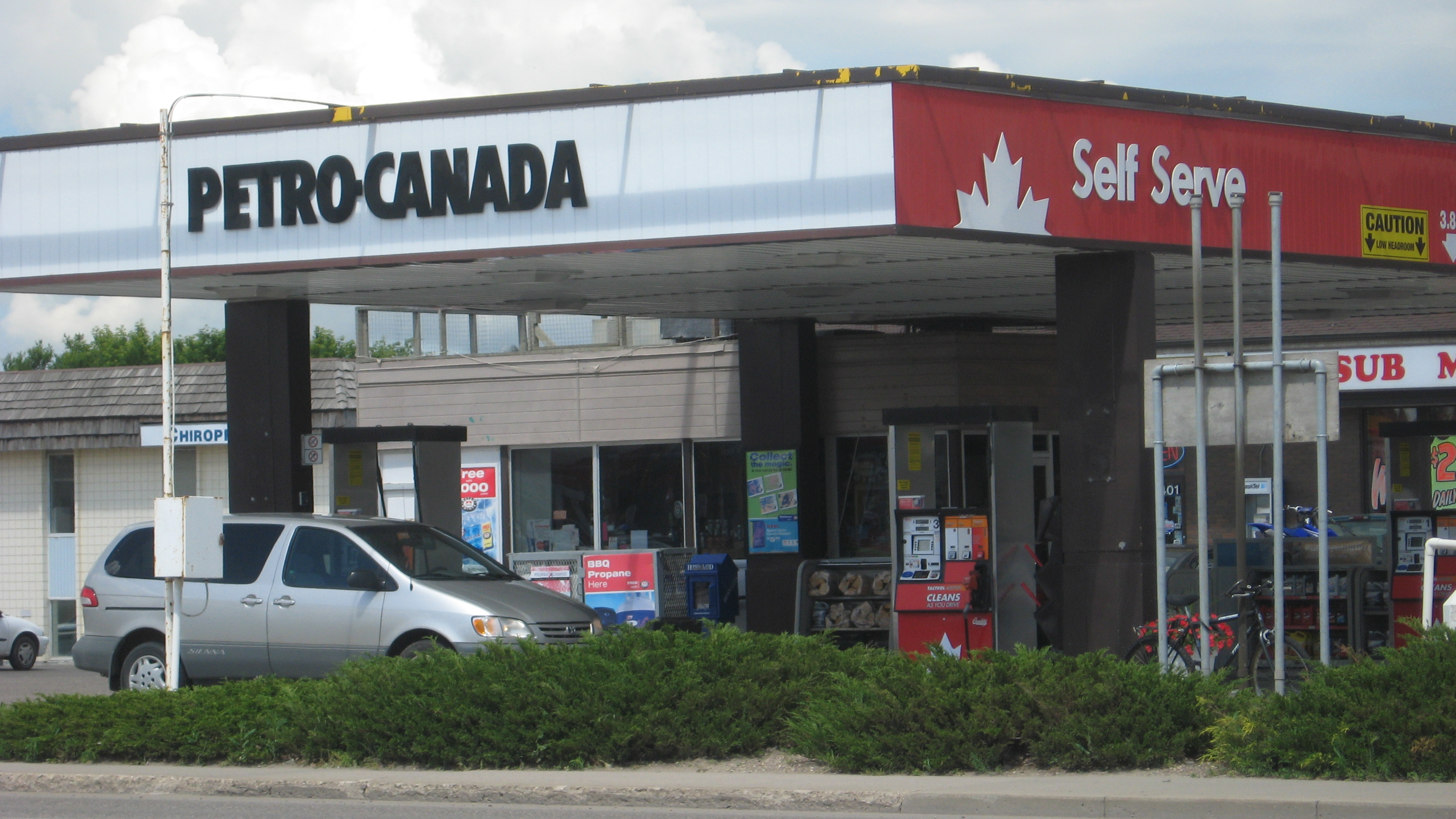
A Petro-Canada station in Saskatoon, Saskatchewan

As early as the mid-1990s in some Alberta locations, Petro-Canada started opening a new fast-food deli-oriented branded convenience store called Neighbours. As of 2025, most of these stores are in Ontario’s GTA. The kitchen provided freshly made sandwiches as well as breakfast and burgers heated from frozen, and in most cases was open from early morning till 9 or 10 in the evening. As of 2013, many of these Neighbours stores have had their kitchens' afternoon and dinner hours drastically slashed and some have been permanently closed and are being rebranded to A&W.

In 2006, Petro-Canada launched a pre-paid wireless carrier known as Petro-Canada Mobility. It is a mobile virtual network operator (MVNO) on the Rogers Wireless network.

Petro Points is the chain's loyalty program. Petro-Canada previously offered a co-branded Petro Points MasterCard in partnership with Citibank Canada. In June 2010, CIBC announced its intent to acquire Citibank's Canadian MasterCard portfolio, including the co-branded Petro-Canada cards. Petro Points currently offers bonuses for RBC clients.

Around 220 Petro-Canada outlets include a "SuperWash" car wash; the majority of these operations use soft touch systems, but some (particularly those that were formerly Sunoco stations) feature touchless equipment instead. Some newer locations feature a "Glide Auto Wash"—a soft touch tunnel that utilizes a flat conveyor belt rather than the roller-based systems traditionally used.

In May 2023, Suncor announced an agreement with Canadian Tire Corporation to convert its over 200 Canadian Tire Gas+ locations to Petro-Canada. This will include integration of Petro Points with Canadian Tire's Triangle Rewards program. The first locations opened in 2024, also introducing a new design that will be used for future Petro-Canada locations.

== Leadership ==
=== President ===
1. Wilbert Hill Hopper, 1976–1979
2. Andrew Janisch, 1979–1982
3. Edward Michel Lakusta, 1982–1990
4. James Mark Stanford, 1990–2000
5. Ronald Alvin Brenneman, 2000–2009

=== Chairman of the Board ===
1. Maurice Frederick Strong, 1976–1978
2. Wilbert Hill Hopper, 1978–1993
3. Alfred Edwin Barroll, 1993–1995
4. James Thompson Black, 1995–1996
5. Thomas Edward Kierans, 1996–2000
6. James Mark Stanford, 2000
7. Brian Frederick MacNeill, 2000–2009

== See also ==
- List of automotive fuel brands
- OPEC
- List of oil-producing states
- History of the petroleum industry in Canada
