= Ron Brenneman =

Canadian oilman

- Born: 4 June 1946 (age 80); London, Ontario
- Education: University of Toronto (BASc 1968); University of Manchester (MSc 1969)

Ronald Alvin Brenneman (born 4 June 1946) was the president and chief executive officer of Petro-Canada. He has been a director at the company since 2000. His annual compensation for 2005 was $2.68 million CAD. Prior to joining Petro-Canada, he was also a director at Scotiabank and Bell Canada Enterprises. He graduated from the University of Toronto in 1968 with a degree in chemical engineering. He also received a Master of Science degree from the University of Manchester and completed the Senior Executive program at the MIT Sloan School of Management.
