= John D. Hopper Jr. =

United States Air Force lieutenant general (born 1946)

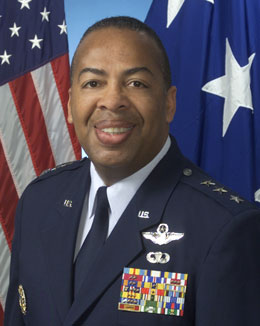
- USAF portrait of John Hopper
- Born: November 16, 1946 (age 79)
- Military career
- Allegiance: United States of America
- Branch: United States Air Force
- Service years: 1969–2005
- Rank: Lieutenant General

John D. Hopper Jr. (born November 16, 1946) is a retired lieutenant general in the United States Air Force. He was Vice Commander, Air Education and Training Command, with headquarters at Randolph Air Force Base, Texas.

Hopper received his commission in 1969 upon graduating from the U.S. Air Force Academy. He has flown in combat in Vietnam and as Commander of the 1660th Tactical Airlift Wing (Provisional) in Southwest Asia during Operation Desert Storm. He also served as the Commandant of Cadets at the U.S. Air Force Academy, and on the Joint Staff at the Pentagon. He is a command pilot with more than 4,000 flying hours in 11 different aircraft.

His awards include the Defense Distinguished Service Medal, Distinguished Service Medal, Defense Superior Service Medal, Legion of Merit with two oak leaf clusters, Distinguished Flying Cross, Meritorious Service Medal with three oak leaf clusters, Air Medal with two oak leaf clusters, Air Force Commendation Medal with oak leaf cluster, Southwest Asia Service Medal with two bronze stars, and the Kuwait Liberation Medal (Kingdom of Saudi Arabia).
