= Lefty Hopper =

American baseball player (1874-1959)

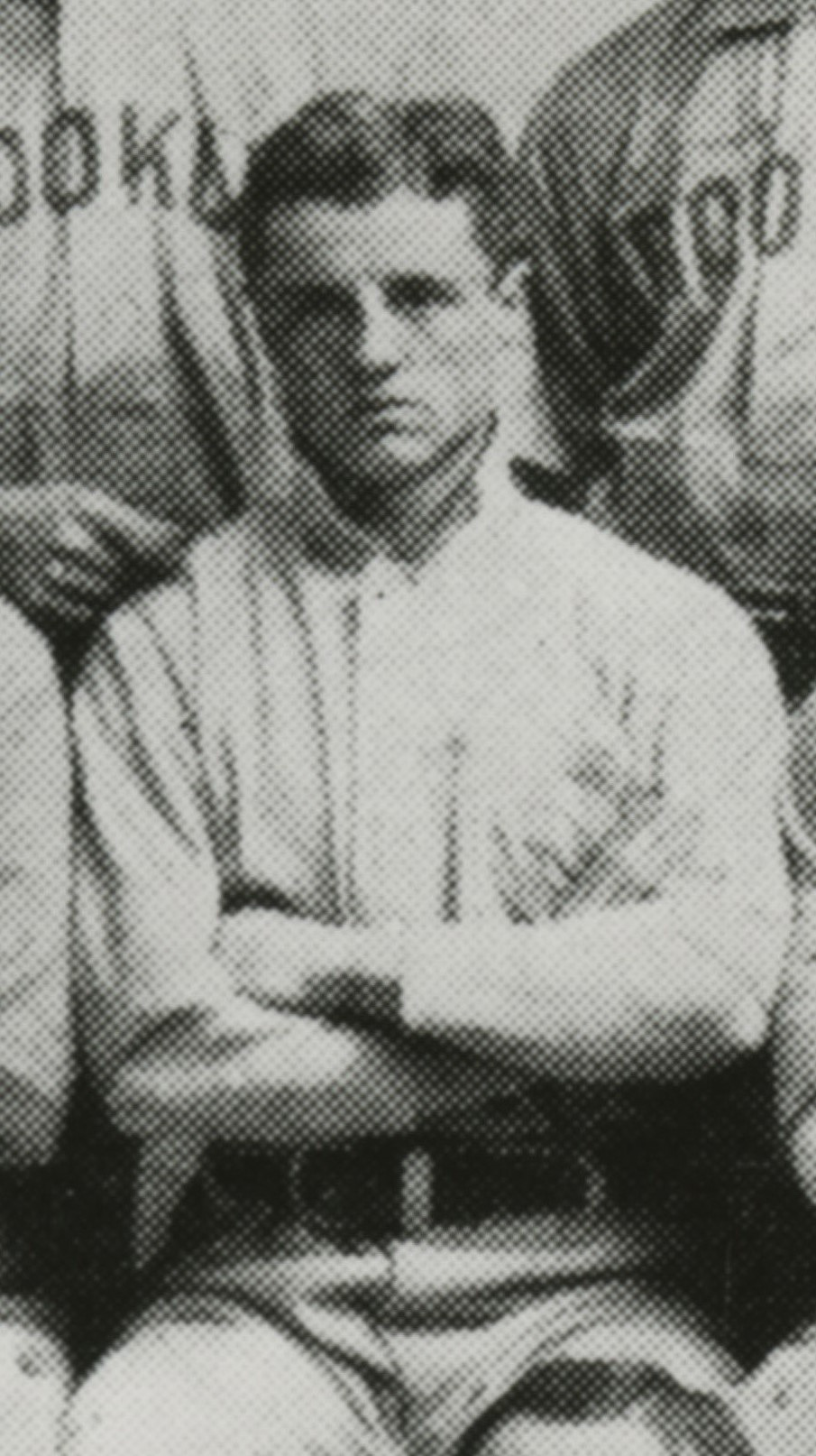
- Hopper in 1898
- Pitcher
- Born: May 27, 1874; Jersey City, New Jersey
- Died: September 27, 1959 (aged 85); San Diego, California
- Batted: Unknown Threw: Left

MLB debut
- October 10, 1898, for the Brooklyn Bridegrooms

Last MLB appearance
- October 13, 1898, for the Brooklyn Bridegrooms

MLB statistics
- Win–loss record: 0-2
- Earned run average: 4.91
- Strikeouts: 5
- Stats at Baseball Reference

Teams
- Brooklyn Bridegrooms (1898)

Clarence Franklin "Lefty" Hopper (May 27, 1874 in Jersey City, New Jersey – September 27, 1959 in San Diego) was an American pitcher in Major League Baseball. He played in two games for the Brooklyn Bridegrooms during the 1898 season.
