= Christopher Hopper =

Manager and secretary of London's Royal Albert Hall (1918–2009)

Christopher Robert Hopper MVO (18 August 1918 – 19 September 2009) was manager and secretary of London's Royal Albert Hall.

He appeared as a castaway on the BBC Radio programme Desert Island Discs on 7 February 1966.

He was a Member of the Royal Victorian Order.
