= James Hopper =

James Hopper may refer to:

- James Hopper (writer) (1876–1956), French-born American writer and novelist
- James Hopper (cricketer) (c. 1790–?), English cricketer
- Jim Hopper (baseball) (1919–1982), American baseball player
- Jim Hopper (Stranger Things), fictional character
