= Paul Hopper =

Paul Hopper may refer to:

- Paul A. Hopper (born 1956), Australian bioentrepreneur
- Paul J. Hopper, American linguist
