= Mary Hopper =

- Born: October 4, 1951 (age 74)
- Genres: Classical
- Occupation: Conductor
- Instrument: Voice

Mary Hopper (born 4 October 1951) is an American choral conductor and music minister. She was on the faculty of the Wheaton College Conservatory of Music and president of the American Choral Directors Association from 2015 to 2017.

At Wheaton, where she was on faculty from 1979 to 2022, she directed the Men's Glee Club and Women's Chorale and oversaw performance studies programs and faculty. She has had both journal articles and book chapters on choral music published.

Hopper studied at the University of Iowa.
