= Killing of Suzanne Hopper =

American deputy sheriff killed in the line of duty

Suzanne Waughtel Hopper
- Born: Suzanne Bauer; November 11, 1970
- Died: January 1, 2011 (aged 40); Enon Beach, Ohio
- Police career
- Department: Clark County Sheriff's Office
- Service years: 1999–2011
- Rank: Deputy
- Badge no.: 12-69
- Memorials: Deputy Suzanne Hopper Memorial Highway; Suzanne Hopper Act

In a shooting incident on New Year's Day 2011, Suzanne Waughtel Hopper (née Bauer; November 11, 1970), a Clark County, Ohio deputy sheriff, was killed in the line of duty. She had been responding to a call from a member of the public about shots fired in the vicinity.

The perpetrator, Michael Ferryman, aged 57, had been previously found not guilty by reason of insanity (NGRI) after a previous incident in 2001. At the time of the 2011 shooting, Ohio's Law Enforcement Automated Data System (LEADS) did not include NGRI findings, so when Hopper checked for information about Ferryman, the system did not report any information about the previous violent incident. After Ferryman shot Hopper, a shootout and standoff lasting several hours ensued, and he was killed by other responding officers.

After her Hopper's death, the state of Ohio passed the Suzanne Hopper Act. The law requires courts to send information about certain mental health rulings to a police database.

== Hopper's early life and career ==
Suzanne Bauer was born on November 11, 1970. She grew up in Ohio. In 1999 she joined the Clark County Sheriff's Office. Over 12 years she worked her way up to become a respected deputy. In 2008 she started a volleyball fundraiser for the Special Olympics. The event raised money for athletes with intellectual disabilities. Hopper was named the department's Officer of the Year. She also won gold medals in weightlifting at the Police Olympics. According to the sheriff's office, she once went six straight years without calling in sick. She married Matthew Hopper in 2010. She had two children from an earlier marriage. Matthew had two children from a previous relationship. After Matthew died of cancer in 2014, Suzanne's parents Charles and Bonnie Bauer raised all four children.

== Shooting ==
On the morning of January 1, 2011, the Clark County Sheriff's Office got a call about shots fired at the Enon Beach campground. The campground is near Enon, Ohio, about 15 miles east of Dayton. Hopper and her partner drove to the scene. They arrived around 11:30 a.m. Hopper got out of her patrol car. She saw a footprint in the snow or mud near a parked trailer. According to Sheriff Gene Kelly, she bent down to take a photograph of the footprint. Inside the trailer, a man was waiting. He fired a 12‑gauge shotgun through a window. The shot hit Hopper from very close range. She fell to the ground. Sheriff Kelly later told reporters that Hopper had no chance to take cover or fire back. "She never had an opportunity to defend herself," Kelly said.

Other officers arrived. The gunman kept shooting from inside the trailer. Police could not reach Hopper's body right away because of the gunfire. The standoff lasted for several hours. Officers from multiple agencies surrounded the trailer. At one point, German Township Police Officer Jeremy Blum was hit by gunfire. He survived his wounds. Finally, police shot and killed the gunman. After the shooting stopped, they were able to recover Hopper's body. She was pronounced dead at the scene.

The gunman was Michael Ferryman, 57 years old. Ferryman had a long history of mental illness. In 2001 he had been in a shootout with police in Morgan County, Ohio. Following that incident, a court had found him not guilty by reason of insanity (NGRI), and he was sent to a state mental hospital and later released. At the time of the 2011 shooting, Ohio's Law Enforcement Automated Data System (LEADS) did not include NGRI findings. So when Hopper ran a check on Ferryman, no mental health alert came up. She did not know about his violent past. Ferryman's girlfriend was later convicted of giving him the shotgun. She was sentenced to five years in prison.

== Suzanne Hopper Act ==
After Hopper's death, state lawmakers realized there was a gap in the information system. Police could see criminal convictions but not findings of insanity or incompetence to stand trial. That meant officers could walk into a dangerous situation without knowing the person had a history of violent mental illness. Senator Chris Widener and Senator Bill Beagle sponsored a bill to fix this. The bill was named the Suzanne Hopper Act.

The Suzanne Hopper Act (Ohio Senate Bill 7) requires Ohio courts to report three types of mental health rulings to the Ohio State Highway Patrol. The patrol then enters the information into LEADS and the federal NCIC database. The three types are: a finding of not guilty by reason of insanity (NGRI); a finding that a person is incompetent to stand trial; and a court order sending someone to a mental hospital against their will. When a police officer runs a name or address, the system shows a "mental health alert" flag if any of these rulings exist. The officer can then call a crisis team or be extra careful. The law does not include every mental health diagnosis. It only covers court rulings about insanity or incompetence.

The Ohio Senate passed the bill on March 20, 2013. The vote was 32 to 1. The Ohio House passed it on May 29, 2013 by a vote of 92 to 0. Governor John Kasich signed the law on June 4, 2013. He held the signing ceremony at the Clark County Sheriff's Office. Hopper's family and coworkers attended. The law took effect on September 4, 2013. By 2015, the Ohio Bureau of Criminal Investigation had added thousands of previously missing mental health records to LEADS. Police across the state started getting mental health alerts on their in‑car computers.

== Legacy ==
Hopper's department named her Deputy of the Year after her death. The award was given posthumously.

On May 15, 2012, President Barack Obama spoke at the National Peace Officers Memorial Service on Capitol Hill. He mentioned Hopper by name. Obama said she was "the go‑to" person in her department. He also said she "loved her family, loved her job, and loved her community."

In 2013, the Ohio legislature designated a part of Interstate 70 as the "Deputy Suzanne Hopper Memorial Highway." The sign stands between Interstate 675 and Enon Road in Clark County.

In August 2023, the Clark County 9-1-1 Communications Center was dedicated to the memory of Hopper and another deputy, Matthew Yates. The center handles all emergency calls for the county.
