= Anita Hopper =

American molecular geneticist

Anita Carol Klein Hopper
- Education: University of Illinois at Chicago; University of Illinois Urbana-Champaign
- Scientific career
- Workplaces: Ohio State University; Pennsylvania State University; University of Massachusetts Medical School
- Thesis: An investigation into the replication of satellite tobacco necrosis virus and tobacco necrosis virus RNA genomes. (1972)

Anita Hopper is an American molecular geneticist who is a professor at the Ohio State University. She studies the mechanisms of distribution of RNA between the nucleus and cytoplasm. She is a Fellow of the American Academy of Microbiology and the American Association for the Advancement of Science and was elected a Member of the National Academy of Sciences in 2021.

== Early life and education ==
Hopper was an undergraduate student at the University of Illinois at Chicago, where she studied biology. She moved to the University of Illinois Urbana-Champaign for her graduate studies, where she specialized in cell biology. Hopper studied the replication of satellite tobacco necrosis virus. After completing her doctoral research she moved to the University of Washington, where she spent four years as a postdoctoral research associate.

== Research and career ==
Hopper joined the faculty at the University of Massachusetts Medical School in 1975, and was promoted to associate professor. She was appointed professor at the Pennsylvania State University in 1979, where she spent almost thirty years before joining the Ohio State University as chair of the Department of Molecular Genetics.

Hopper makes use of Saccharomyces cerevisiae (yeast) as a model system to study processing and intracellular trafficking of tRNAs. She has shown that tRNA is transported from the nucleus into the cytoplasm, as well as from the cytoplasm into the nucleus. Almost all RNAs involved in protein synthesis are generated in the nucleus but function in the cytoplasm (and vice versa). Hopper both processes occur along nuclear export pathways, where export quality is controlled by the translation machinery itself. She showed that tRNAs from the cytoplasm accumulate in the nucleus under particular stress conditions.

Hopper's area expertise include: intracellular trafficking of RNA and proteins, RNA processing and yeast genetics and genomics.

== Awards and honors ==
- 1994 Elected Fellow of the American Academy of Microbiology
- 2003 President of the RNA Society
- 2008 Elected Fellow of the American Association for the Advancement of Science
- 2009 RNA Society Lifetime Achievement Award in Service
- 2012 Ohio State University Distinguished Scholar Award
- 2015 RNA Society Lifetime Achievement in Science Award
- 2017 Undergraduate Mortar Board/Sphinx Honor Society
- 2021 Elected Fellow of the National Academy of Sciences

== Selected publications ==
- Eric M. Phizicky; Anita K. Hopper (1 September 2010). "tRNA biology charges to the front". Genes & Development. 24 (17): 1832–60. doi:10.1101/gad.1956510. ISSN 0890-9369. PMC 2932967. PMID 20810645. Wikidata Q29616318.
- Anita K Hopper; Eric M Phizicky (15 January 2003). "tRNA transfers to the limelight". Genes & Development. 17 (2): 162–80. doi:10.1101/gad.1049103. ISSN 0890-9369. PMID 12533506. Wikidata Q28203809.
- A K Hopper; H M Traglia; R W Dunst (August 1990). "The yeast RNA1 gene product necessary for RNA processing is located in the cytosol and apparently excluded from the nucleus". Journal of Cell Biology. 111 (2): 309–21. doi:10.1083/jcb.111.2.309. ISSN 0021-9525. PMC 2116204. PMID 2116418. Wikidata Q24678911.

== Personal life ==
Hopper was married to biochemist James Hopper, with whom she had one daughter. James Hopper died at his home in Columbus, Ohio January 21, 2017.
