= Briallen Hopper =

American author, writer, and literary scholar

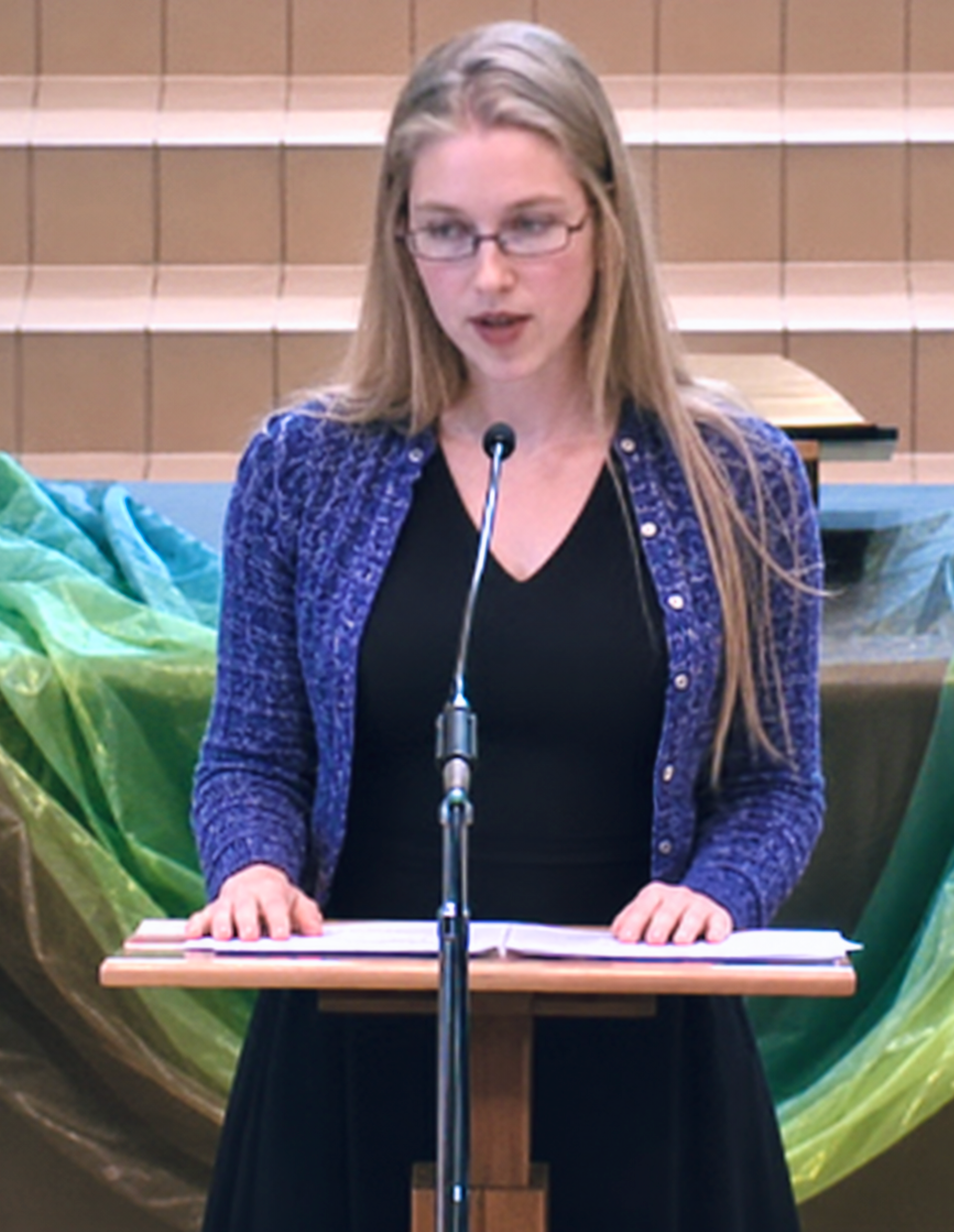
- Dr. Hopper at Yale University, 2010
- Education: University of Puget Sound (BA); Princeton University (PhD); Yale University (MDiv) (dropped out)
- Occupations: Author, professor, essayist

Briallen Hopper is an American author, writer, columnist, and literary critic. She is the author of the Bloomsbury collection Hard to Love: Essays and Confessions (2019), which was named a Kirkus Reviews Best Memoir of the Year and CBC Best International Nonfiction Book of the Year. Her work has been published in The Washington Post, The Yale Review, Vox, New York Magazine, and other publications. She is a frequent contributor to The Cut, The New Republic, Avidly, and Curbed, where her column "House Rules" covered topics such as mental health, culture, and community during the COVID-19 pandemic. Her second book, forthcoming from Columbia University Press, is described as a "critical memoir in dialogue with Marilynne Robinson’s Gilead novels."

Hopper is director of the MFA in Creative Writing program at Queens College, CUNY, and an associate professor in the English department, teaching non-fiction, creative writing, public writing, protest prose, personal essay, writing about religion, and editorial practices. She is the U.S. representative and contributing editor of award-winning independent press And Other Stories, and serves as editor-in-chief of online religion and culture literary magazine, Killing The Buddha. Her essay, "Young Adult Cancer Story," remains the most-viewed piece in the history of the Los Angeles Review of Books.

Hopper is the creator of many original writers' workshops, including Writing About Family and Writing About Religion, which have since become popular creative non-fiction courses taught at Columbia, Princeton, and Yale, as well as Plumfield Writing, a summer program whose proceeds benefit local food banks and community-based education initiatives. She teaches Writing About Family at Yale University.

== Early life ==
Briallen Hopper grew up as one of six siblings in an evangelical Christian household. As a teenager she loved 19th-century novels by women, including authors like Louisa May Alcott, George Eliot, the Bronte sisters, Jane Austen, Elizabeth Gaskell: "They all write so intensely about young women becoming adults and I took it all to heart."

Hopper began her higher education at Tacoma Community College, where she also began teaching, tutoring English and ESL as a work-study job. She transferred to the University of Puget Sound, graduating summa cum laude in English and History. She earned a PhD from Princeton in 2008. Following her PhD, Hopper became a full-time lecturer and University Church Faculty Fellow at Yale University.

== Career ==
While earning her PhD, Hopper taught in the Princeton English Department as a Quin Morton Teaching Fellow, where she won an APGA Teaching Award with the Princeton Writing Program for her classes on "American Short Fiction" and "African American Satire." Princeton Writing Program Director Kerry Walk said of Hopper, "Briallen is a teacher whose greatest gift is to inspire students to take their thinking and writing to the next level – and then to the level beyond that one."

Following her PhD, Hopper enrolled at Yale Divinity School where the 2008 academic hiring freeze made securing full-time academic posts newly difficult. The experience of writing sermons as a preacher encouraged her to experiment with writing for a broad audience ("written for actual people, not for someone on JSTOR in seven years,") and Hopper began writing popular essays, published in the Huffington Post and the Los Angeles Review of Books. In 2011, she left divinity school but remained a preacher and professor with the Yale English Department, teaching creative writing while serving on Yale's Advisory Committee for Diversity and Faculty Development. Hopper was subsequently hired by the English Department at Queens College, CUNY, where she is an associate professor of writing and co-director of the MFA Program. She has been teaching creative writing with the Yale Prison Education Initiative (YPEI) since 2020.

During the COVID-19 pandemic, Hopper's Curbed advice column "House Rules" was acquired by New York Magazine, covering topics such as mental health, remote work, and home culture during lockdown. In 2022, Hopper's essay "Sex and the Single Frump" was published in Harper Perennial feminist anthology, Sex and the Single Woman: 24 Writers Reimagine Helen Gurley Brown's Cult Classic (2022). Later that year, her essay "Everybody’s Protest Essay: Personal Protest Prose on the American Internet" was published in The Edinburgh Companion to the Essay (2022) as part of Edinburgh University Press' series, Edinburgh Companions to Literature and the Humanities.

=== Hard to Love ===
In 2019, Hopper published a collection of 21 essays on relationships entitled Hard to Love: Essays and Confessions. Writing in the Observer, Lauren LeBlanc called Hard to Love "an incredibly thoughtful examination of the various ways we depend upon others, through an expansive and engaging look at love outside a traditional romantic sphere." Rejecting the "single versus partner binary" as the primary question of relationships, Hopper's book instead focuses, in LeBlanc's description, on "the unsung ways that we support and encourage one another." Hopper discusses Spinsterhood, Ivy League sperm banks, online dating, caring for a friend going through chemotherapy, the possibility of single motherhood, and her response to the 2018 Women's March, among other topics relating to relationships outside of romantic partnership.

Publishers Weekly praised Hopper's style as "a voice that is sophisticated and analytical, but also earnest and eager". In the Los Angeles Review of Books, Ellen Wayland-Smith wrote that "what Hopper does so artfully in her work is to disrupt the foregone narrative conclusions imposed on American women," turning away (if not initially by choice) from the "plot-driven love — clocks both nuptial and biological — Hopper learned to let herself float in the immediacy and plotlessness of her friendships." The collection was a creative nonfiction finalist for the Washington State Book Award; Kirkus Reviews named it a Best Memoir of the Year and CBC named it a Best International Nonfiction Book of the Year.

=== Other writing ===
In March 2020, during the COVID-19 pandemic, Hopper wrote about living conditions in her home of Elmhurst, Queens, a blue-collar neighborhood devastated by the virus. Her essay, "Sirenland," was published as part of The Yale Review's "Pandemic Files", an ongoing series chronicling the pandemic crisis. In the essay, Hopper (who lives beside Elmhurst Hospital) details her view of the outbreak from the "center of the center" of the COVID-19 pandemic in New York, watching refrigerator trucks turn into makeshift roaming morgues and watching the state itself become the epicenter of the global pandemic. The essay was eventually published as part of Meghan O'Rourke’s collection, A World Out of Reach: Dispatches from Life Under Lockdown.

Following praise from John Green, Hopper's essay, "Young Adult Cancer Story," a review of The Fault in Our Stars, became the most-viewed essay in the history of the Los Angeles Review of Books.

== Bibliography ==
=== Books ===
- 2019, Hard to Love: Essays and Confessions

=== Essays ===
- 2026, "Lessons in Parenting From a Salmon", The New Republic
- 2026, "Anne Lamott’s Battle Against Writer’s Block", The New Republic
- 2025, "The Books That Ruin Your Life", The New Republic
- 2024, "In the Beginning, There Was Marilynne Robinson", The New Republic
- 2022, "Everybody’s Protest Essay: Personal Protest Prose on the American Internet", The Edinburgh Companion to the Essay
- 2022, "Sex and the Single Frump", Sex and the Single Woman: 24 Writers Reimagine Helen Gurley Brown's Cult Classic
- 2021, "Learning to Write about Religion," The God Beat: What Journalists Have to Say about Faith
- 2020, "Sirenland", A World Out of Reach: Dispatches from Life Under Lockdown
- "Relying on Friendship in a World Made for Couples." New York Magazine
- 2015, "On Spinsters", Los Angeles Review of Books
- 2014, "Young Adult Cancer Story", Los Angeles Review of Books
