= The Heathen's Guide to World Religions =

Book by William Hopper

- Author: William Hopper
- Illustrator: William Hopper
- Language: English
- Subject: Religious studies
- Publisher: Eris Publications
- Publication date: 2008
- Publication place: Canada
- Pages: 206
- ISBN: 0-9731508-4-X
- OCLC: 45003057

The Heathen's Guide to World Religions is a book by Kingston, Ontario-based William Hopper (1966–2017). It is a humorous look at the history of the Jewish, Christian, Islamic, Buddhist, and Hindu faiths.

The book was written in 1997, and self-published by Hopper that same year. After attracting the attention of publishers, it was re-released in 2001 by StoneFox Publishing. After StoneFox went defunct in 2003, the rights to the book reverted to the author. In 2005, Hopper founded Diogenes Press, publishing a new, expanded edition of The Heathen's Guide to World Religions. In 2008, Hopper worked with Eris Publications to produce the current "New World Order" edition. The most recent edition was published in 2011.
