= William Hopper (industrialist) =

Scottish industrialist

William Hopper(22 June, 1816, Penicuik – 23 April, 1885, Moscow) was a Scottish industrialist who moved to Moscow to found a machine tool factory there in 1847. He played an important role in introducing rugby and association football into Imperial Russia.
