= Thomas Hopper =

Thomas Hopper may refer to:

- Thomas Hopper (architect) (1776–1856), English architect
- Thomas Hopper (cricketer) (1828–1877), English cricketer
- Thomas Hopper (footballer), English footballer
- Tom Hopper (Thomas Edward Hopper, born 1985), English actor
- Tom Hopper (footballer) (Thomas Edward Hopper, born 1993), English footballer
