= Matthew Hopper =

English footballer

Personal information
- Full name: Matthew Hopper
- Date of birth: 17 January 1893
- Place of birth: Ashington, England
- Date of death: 1978 (aged 84–85)
- Place of death: Ashington, England
- Position: Outside right

Senior career*
Years	Team	Apps	(Gls)
1919	Percy Main Amateurs		
1919–1920	Ashington		
1920–1921	Lincoln City		
1921–1923	Millwall	48	(1)
1923–192?	Sittingbourne		
–	Percy Main Colliery		
–	Ashington	0	(0)
–	Catford Southend		
1926–1927	Coventry City	15	(1)
1927–1928	Ashington	19	(1)
–	Annfield Plain		
- * Club domestic league appearances and goals

Matthew Hopper (17 January 1893 – 1978) was an English footballer who made 82 appearances in the Football League playing for Millwall, Coventry City and Ashington. He played as an outside right.

Hopper, a native of Ashington, began his career in non-league football, including contributing to Lincoln City's Midland League title in 1920–21. When he signed for Third Division club Millwall in April 1921, the Daily Express reported how "the spectators appreciated his clever wing play and shooting" when Lincoln eliminated Millwall from the FA Cup earlier in the year. He made his Football League debut on 30 April, against Southampton, "proved as speedy and as hard a worker" as in that Cup tie, and was expected to "do better when he has had more experience with his new colleagues". By the end of the 1921–22 season, the Express rated him "one of the most improved players in the team". At the end of the next, Hopper left Millwall, and played non-league football until resuming his league career in 1926 with Coventry City and then Ashington. His last club was Annfield Plain in his native north-east of England.
