= Wilbert Hopper =

Canadian oilman (1933–2006)

Bill Hopper
- Born: 14 March 1933; Ottawa, Ontario
- Died: 3 July 2006 (aged 73); Ottawa, Ontario
- Education: American University (BSc 1955); University of Western Ontario (MBA 1959)
- Spouse: Patricia Marguerite Walker (m. 1957)

Wilbert Hill "Bill" Hopper OC (14 March 1933 – 3 July 2006) was a Canadian civil servant and business executive. He was the president, chief executive officer, and chairman of Petro-Canada, a Canadian oil and gas firm.

== Biography ==
Hopper was born in Ottawa on 14 March 1933 to Wilbert Clayton Hopper (1894–1965) and Eva Luella Hill (1898–1986). In Ottawa, Hopper attended Rockcliffe Park Public School and Lisgar Collegiate Institute. Later he attended Scots College in Sydney, Australia, and Wellington College in Wellington, New Zealand, where he graduated high school in 1951. After high school, Hopper attended American University in Washington, DC, where he graduated bachelor of science in geology in 1955.

Hopper began his career in 1955 when he joined Imperial Oil as a petroleum geologist. He remained with the company through the spring of 1957. In the fall of that year, he enrolled at the University of Western Ontario in London and in 1959 earned a master of business administration. In 1959, he joined Foster Associates as a petroleum economist. Two year later, Hopper moved to the National Energy Board in Ottawa where he worked again as a petroleum economist. He remained with the government until 1964, when he joined Arthur D. Little in Cambridge, Massachusetts as a senior petroleum consultant.

In 1973, Hopper returned to the Canadian federal government in Ottawa and became assistant deputy minister of energy policy within the Department of Energy, Mines and Resources. In January 1976, Hopper became the first president of the new crown corporation Petro-Canada. In 1978 he gained the additional title of chairman of the board, and in 1979 ceded the presidency. Hopper remained chairman of Petro-Canada until 1993, when he was succeeded by Alfred Edwin Barroll.

From 1983 to 1992, he was the chairman of the Board of Westcoast Energy Inc.

In 1985, he was made an Officer of the Order of Canada for his "encyclopaedic knowledge of energy and of the environment in which the industry operates has enabled him to skillfully guide the development of the company into a major component of this country's petroleum industry".

He held honorary degrees from Wilfrid Laurier University and Memorial University of Newfoundland. He died in July 2006.

In 1984, the National Film Board produced a documentary about Hopper entitled The Man from Petrocan.

On 12 August 1957 at Rundle Memorial United Church in Banff, Hopper married Patricia Marguerite Walker (d. 2011). The Hoppers had two children, Sean Wilbert and Christopher Mark. Bill Hopper died on 3 July 2006 at the Queensway Carleton Hospital in Ottawa at age 73.
