= Alan Hopper =

English footballer (born 1937)

Personal information
- Full name: Alan Hopper
- Date of birth: 17 July 1937 (age 89)
- Place of birth: Newcastle, England
- Position: Right back

Senior career*
Years	Team	Apps	(Gls)
- Horden Colliery Welfare
1959–1960	Newcastle United	0	(0)
1960–1961	South Shields		
1961–1965	Barnsley	135	(4)
1965–1966	Bradford City	8	(0)
Total		143	(4)
- * Club domestic league appearances and goals

Alan Hopper (born 17 July 1937) is an English former professional footballer who played as a right back.

== Career ==
Born in Newcastle, Hopper played for Newcastle United, South Shields, Barnsley and Bradford City.
