= Air and Space Training Ribbon =

Military award of the United States Armed Forces

- Air and Space Training Ribbon
- Type: Ribbon
- Presented by: the Department of the Air Force
- Eligibility: Completion of initial accession training
- Status: Current
- Established: 12 October 1980
- First award: Retroactive to 14 August 1974
- Ribbon as worn by prior enlisted personnel who complete officer accession training.

Precedence
- Next (higher): Small Arms Expert Marksmanship Ribbon
- Equivalent: Army Service Ribbon

The Air and Space Training Ribbon (ASTR), known as the Air Force Training Ribbon until November 2020, is the lowest military award of the United States Air Force and United States Space Force, ranking only above foreign military awards.

The Air and Space Training Ribbon was authorized as the Air Force Training Ribbon by the Chief of Staff, U.S. Air Force on 12 October 1980. It is awarded to U.S. Air Force and U.S. Space Force service members on completion of initial accession training after 14 August 1974. Initial accession training in USAF is defined as Basic Military Training (BMT) for enlisted personnel, Basic Cadet Training (BCT) at the United States Air Force Academy (USAFA), or commissioning through Air Force ROTC (AFROTC), Officer Training School (OTS) or other specialized USAF officer accession programs.

In December 1986, the criteria expanded and authorized the ribbon to anyone who was on active duty in December 1986, regardless of when they completed initial accession training. The ribbon was designed by the Institute of Heraldry. The ribbon has a wide center stripe of red, flanked on either side by a wide stripe of dark blue and a narrow yellow stripe edged by a narrow dark blue stripe.

On 16 November 2020, the Air Force Training Ribbon was renamed to the Air and Space Training Ribbon by the Secretary of the Air Force.

== Devices and subsequent awards ==
The Air and Space Training Ribbon may not be awarded for completing flight training, technical training, career development courses, professional military education (PME) and other services' basic training or officer training. USAF or USSF enlisted personnel who initially accessed through BMT who later complete USAF or USSF officer accession training (i.e., OTS, AFROTC, USAFA and so forth) are entitled to a subsequent award denoted by a bronze oak leaf cluster.

Officers who complete Air Force or Space Force officer accession training, but completed their enlisted training in the Army, receive the Air and Space Training Ribbon on the basis of their officer accessions and wear it in addition to the Army Service Ribbon.

Authorized Device: Oak Leaf Cluster

== Sister service equivalents ==
The United States Army grants the Army Service Ribbon in a manner similar to the Air and Space Training Ribbon.

The United States Navy and United States Coast Guard do not have an award corresponding to the Air and Space Training Ribbon. The ribbon is prohibited on all USN and USCG uniforms worn by former USAF or USSF personnel.

The United States Marine Corps does not have an equivalent ribbon, but instead awards their trademark Eagle, Globe & Anchor insignia upon completion of Recruit Training or Officer Candidate School, or at commissioning for those Marine Corps officers accessed via the United States Naval Academy (USNA), Naval ROTC (NROTC) Marine Corps Option or USMC Platoon Leaders Class (PLC). Like the Navy and the Coast Guard, wear of the Air and Space Training Ribbon is also prohibited on all USMC uniforms worn by former USAF or USSF personnel.
