= RCOT =

RCOT may refer to:

- Reserve Commissioned Officer Training
- Royal College of Occupational Therapists
