= Penn State Air Force ROTC =

The Air Force Reserve Officer Training Corps (ROTC) at Pennsylvania State University, known as Detachment 720, provides undergraduate students the opportunity to earn a commission as a second lieutenant in the United States Air Force immediately upon graduation from Penn State. The Air Force ROTC program takes 3 to 4 years to complete. Students do not incur an obligation to the Air Force unless they have accepted a scholarship or have entered the Professional Officer Course.

== Crosstown arrangements ==
For students not attending the University Park campus, crosstown ROTC agreements are available for students attending one of the many Commonwealth Campuses. Students at the Altoona Campus commute to University Park two days a week, while students in other parts of the state can train with Detachment 730 at the University Pittsburgh, Detachment 752 at Wilkes University, or Detachment 750 at St. Joseph's University. PSU AFROTC offers an optional New Cadet Orientation Program (NOCP) for students every August.

== Course of instruction ==
AFROTC is broken up into two sections, General Military Course (GMC) and Professional Officer Course (POC). Usually between junior and sophomore years, students will attend 24 days of field training at Maxwell AFB in Montgomery, Alabama. This is also where Officer Training School (OTS) is conducted and AFROTC cadets use the same campus and facilities as their OTS counterparts. OTS trains officer candidates for their commission after they have already graduated from college, OTS has different application and completion requirements.

=== General Military Course ===
The first two years of the program consist of the General Military Course and does not incur a military service obligation, unless the student is on an ROTC scholarship. GMC involves one hour of classwork and two hours of leadership exercises each week.

=== Professional Officer Course ===
Students who wish to continue on through ROTC must complete the POC after completing Field Training to earn their commission. POC involves three hours of classroom lecture and one or two hour leadership training lab each week.

== Scholarships ==
Full and partial scholarships are available, depending upon major. Scholarship opportunities exist for high school students who will be attending Penn State, Air Force active duty enlisted personnel, and students currently attending Penn State University. In addition to tuition and lab fee assistance, ROTC students receive up to $500 monthly living stipend and an annual textbook allowance.
