= Air Force Officer Qualifying Test =

United States Air Force officer selection test

- Acronym: AFOQT
- Type: Computer-based standardized test
- Administrator: United States Department of the Air Force
- Skills tested: Verbal, quantitative, spatial, aviation, perceptual speed, situational judgment, and personality-related measures
- Purpose: Selection for Department of the Air Force officer commissioning programs and classification into officer training programs
- Year started: 1953; 73 years ago
- Duration: About five hours including breaks
- Score range: Composite percentile scores from 1 to 99 for Pilot, Combat Systems Officer, Air Battle Manager, Academic Aptitude, Verbal, and Quantitative composites
- Score validity: No expiration date for valid Form T scores; superscoring is used across composites
- Offered: By appointment; voucher required
- Restrictions on attempts: At least 90 days between administrations; a third administration requires a waiver
- Regions: United States
- Languages: English
- Prerequisites: Eligibility verified through a recruiter or test control officer
- Fee: Free of charge; voucher required
- Used by: Department of the Air Force officer accession, selection, and classification programs
- Website: www.pearsonvue.com/us/en/afoqt.html

The Air Force Officer Qualifying Test (AFOQT) is a standardized test used by the United States Department of the Air Force to select applicants for officer commissioning programs, including Officer Training School (OTS) and the Air Force Reserve Officer Training Corps (AFROTC). Department of the Air Force policy describes the AFOQT as a commissioning requirement and as a test used to classify commissioned officers into utilization specialties such as pilot, combat systems officer, air battle manager, or technical specialties.

== Test sections ==
The AFOQT consists of 516 multiple choice questions across 12 timed subtests, with the exam lasting about five hours including breaks. The Self-Description Inventory is included in the test but is not graded.

AFOQT Test Sections
Section	Abbreviation	Time (minutes)	Questions
Verbal Analogies	VA	8	25
Arithmetic Reasoning	AR	29	25
Word Knowledge	WK	5	25
Math Knowledge	MK	22	25
Reading Comprehension	RC	24	25
Situational Judgment	SJ	35	16
Self-Description Inventory	SDI	45	240
Physical Science	PS	10	20
Table Reading	TR	7	40
Instrument Comprehension	IC	5	25
Block Counting	BC	5	30
Aviation Information	AI	8	20

=== Composite scores ===
AFOQT scores are reported through composite scores in the areas of pilot, combat systems officer (CSO), air battle manager (ABM), academic aptitude, verbal, and quantitative. Composite scores are reported as percentiles from 1 to 99, reflecting an examinee's ranking on that composite against a reference population.

AFOQT Composite Score Components
Composite	Total Score
Pilot	MK + TR + IC + AI
CSO	VA + AR + MK + PS + TR + BC
ABM	VA + WK + RC + TR + IC + AI
Academic Aptitude	VA + AR + WK + MK + RC
Verbal	VA + WK + RC
Quantitative	AR + MK

== Use in officer candidate selection ==
The AFOQT is one of several factors considered by officer selection boards. The AFOQT is also used for selection into rated training programs. For pilot and remotely piloted aircraft applicants, the AFOQT pilot composite is used with the Test of Basic Aviation Skills and logged flying hours to calculate the Pilot Candidate Selection Method score.

The AFOQT was first administered in 1953. The first version, later designated Form A, was developed for selecting officers for advanced Air Force Reserve Officer Training Corps training. During the 1950s, use of the test expanded to pilot selection, officer candidate school, the Air Force Reserve, and the Air National Guard. New forms have been introduced periodically to preserve test security, update obsolete content, and improve prediction of officer success.

=== Minimum scores ===
The Department of the Air Force has established minimum AFOQT standards for commissioning and classification in officer commissioning programs. The general commissioning minimums are a Verbal score of 15 and a Quantitative score of 10. Rated applicants must also meet the minimum for the relevant rated composite.

AFOQT Minimum Composite Score Standards
Officer Type	Verbal	Quantitative	Pilot	CSO	ABM
Any	15	10			
Pilot	15	10	25	no min	no min
Combat Systems Officer	15	10	no min	25	no min
Air Battle Manager	15	10	no min	no min	25

== Validity and psychometric research ==
The AFOQT has been the subject of research in military psychology, aviation psychology, and personnel selection. A 1996 factor-analytic study found that the AFOQT was best represented by a hierarchical model with general cognitive ability and five lower-order factors: verbal, math, spatial, aircrew, and perceptual speed.

A RAND Corporation review of AFOQT research concluded that the test predicts important Air Force outcomes and reviewed questions about its validity, fairness, bias, cost, and possible replacement by the SAT. A 2010 study in Military Psychology examined 10,542 officers in 14 non-rated technical training courses and found that 63 of 70 observed correlations between AFOQT composites and average technical training grades were statistically significant. A 2020 meta-analysis examined the predictive validity of AFOQT subtests and the Pilot composite for pilot performance.

== See also ==
- Air Force Officer Training School
- Armed Services Vocational Aptitude Battery
- Test of Basic Aviation Skills
