= Air Force Reserve Officer Training Corps =

Commissioning source for US Air Force and Space Force officers

Air Force ROTC emblem

The Air Force Reserve Officers' Training Corps (AFROTC) is one of the three primary commissioning sources for officers in the United States Air Force and United States Space Force, the other two being the United States Air Force Academy (USAFA) and Air Force Officer Training School (OTS). A subordinate command of the Air University within the Air Education and Training Command (AETC), AFROTC is aligned under the Jeanne M. Holm Center for Officer Accessions and Citizen Development at Maxwell AFB, Alabama. The Holm Center, formerly known as the Air Force Officer Accession and Training Schools (AFOATS), retains direct responsibility for both AFROTC and OTS.

AFROTC is the largest and oldest source of commissioned officers for the U.S. Air Force. AFROTC's stated mission is to produce quality leaders for the U.S. Air Force and U.S. Space Force. AFROTC units are located on 145 college and university campuses with 1100+ additional institutions of higher learning participating in cross-town agreements that allow their students to attend AFROTC classes at a nearby "host" college or university. According to AFROTC HQ, in 2006, AFROTC commissioned 2,083 USAF Second Lieutenants, with AFROTC enrollment ranging from 23,605 in 1985 to 10,231 in 1993, and around 13,000 enrolled today.

== History ==
The Reserve Officers' Training Corps (ROTC) was established with the passage of the National Defense Act of 1916, with Army ROTC established in 1916 followed by Naval ROTC in 1926. The 1916 act established program guidelines that remained in effect until 1964.

The National Defense Act of 1920 continued ROTC, and units to train aeronautically rated officers for the then-U.S. Army Air Corps were created. By 1926, seven such units existed, at the Agricultural and Mechanical College of Texas, the Georgia Institute of Technology, the Massachusetts Institute of Technology, New York University, the University of California, the University of Illinois, and the University of Washington. A lack of funds and facilities to support flight training near the colleges during the interwar period and the meager output of the programs (about fifty lieutenants a year combined) in relation to manpower requirements for the number of Air Corps Reserve units forced the units at Texas A&M, Georgia Tech, and the University of Washington to cease in 1928, with the remaining units subsequently training only non-rated (i.e., ground) officers. Since the Air Corps had virtually no requirements for non-rated officers, it closed the units at Illinois in 1931, the University of California and New York University in 1932, and MIT in 1935. Air Corps officers were subsequently accessed via either the U.S. Military Academy (USMA) at West Point, New York or via the Aviation Cadet Program at locations in Texas, California, and Alabama. As opposed to USMA, whose graduates all received bachelor's degrees and were commissioned as Regular Army officers, Aviation Cadets could be accessed without undergraduate college degrees and were all commissioned as Reserve officers. This remained the norm for the Army Air Corps and its successor, the U.S. Army Air Forces, through the end of World War II.

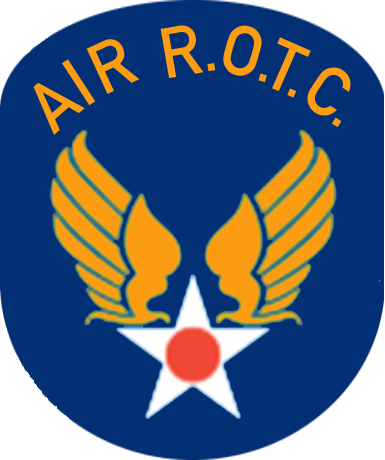
AIR ROTC SSI

After World War II, General of the Army Dwight D. Eisenhower, as Chief of Staff of the Army, signed General Order No. 124, establishing Army Air Forces ROTC units at 78 colleges and universities throughout the nation. In September 1947, with the establishment of the U.S. Air Force as an independent service, these units became Air Force ROTC units. Administrative responsibility for Air Force ROTC was assigned to the Air University (AU) at Maxwell AFB, Alabama.

In 1971, women were admitted to the Air Force ROTC program, having been previously limited to commissioning only via Officer Training School (OTS).

Beginning in 1973, eligible Air Force enlisted men and women pursuing a college degree who were interested in becoming USAF commissioned officers were also afforded the opportunity to enroll in Air Force ROTC through competitive selection to the AFROTC Airman Scholarship and Commissioning Program (AECP). AECP replaced the former BOOTSTRAP program and provided a full AFROTC scholarship in addition to whatever Veterans Administration educational benefits these Airmen were entitled to. However, unlike BOOTSTRAP where enrollees remained on active duty and received full pay and benefits while pursuing a degree and a commission, AECP selectees were required to separate from active duty and their time spent in AECP was not creditable for accrual of active duty service.

In 1978, Air Training Command (ATC) assumed responsibility for AFROTC programs. That same year, opportunities for undergraduate pilot training were afforded to female cadets. Future astronaut, Colonel Eileen Collins, USAF (Retired) was one of the first AFROTC cadets selected for pilot training upon graduation.

On July 1, 1993, ATC merged with Air University to form the Air Education and Training Command (AETC). Air University became a direct reporting unit (DRU) under AETC and AFROTC continued to be aligned under Air University.

In February 1997, AFROTC and Officer Training School merged under a newly created parent organization, Headquarters, Air Force Officer Accession and Training Schools (AFOATS). This restructuring placed oversight for three-quarters of Air Force officer production under one command and facilitated the sharing of manpower and expertise with minimum effect on the day-to-day operations of either organization. In June 2008, HQ AFOATS was re-designated as the Jeanne M. Holm Center for Officer Accessions and Citizen Development, merging administrative responsibility for Air Force ROTC, OTS, Air Force Junior ROTC (AFJROTC), and the Civil Air Patrol (CAP), especially the CAP Cadet Program.

In 2016, authority for CAP was transferred from AETC and the Holm Center to Air Combat Command (ACC) via 1st Air Force (1AF) / Air Forces Northern (AFNORTH) at Tyndall AFB, Florida. The relationship(s) of AFROTC, OTS and AFJROTC to AETC and the Holm Center remained unchanged.

In 2020, United States Space Force officers also began commissioning through the AFROTC program.

== Organization ==
AFROTC units at colleges and universities are called "detachments," and are headed by an active duty USAF officer in the rank of colonel or lieutenant colonel who functions as both the Detachment Commander for USAF purposes and with the nominal title of professor of aerospace studies (PAS) within the institution's academic community. Most colleges and universities will designate the AFROTC detachment as the Department of Aerospace Studies. Depending on the detachment size, the PAS is typically assisted by one to four assistant professors of aerospace studies (APAS), also all active-duty USAF officers. Most APAS hold the rank of captain; however, some are also first lieutenants or majors. Approximately three USAF non-commissioned officers and one senior non-commissioned officer will typically provide military administrative support and are often augmented by one to two civilian staff support employees of the academic institution. Larger detachments may also have a Lieutenant Colonel serve as a vice commander.

Within AFROTC detachments, the students (referred to as "cadets") are organized into wings, groups, squadrons, and flights, mirroring the USAF functional wing structure. The AFROTC detachment's cadet wing or cadet group is separated into two divisions: the General Military Course (GMC) consisting of the first two years of training, and the Professional Officer Course (POC) consisting of the last two years of training. The AFROTC program is also divided into two training functions: the Academic Classroom Program (Aerospace Studies classes) and Cadet Activities (i.e., Leadership Laboratory, Physical Training, and other training).

== Aerospace Studies (AS) ==
Aerospace Studies (AS) classes are the academic portion of AFROTC. The General Military Course (GMC) is a two-year course, consisting of AS100 and AS200 cadets, designed to motivate and prepare cadets for entry into the Professional Officer Course (POC). Each AS100 and AS200 course is designed as a weekly, one academic-hour course. The POC is a two-year course, consisting of AS300 and AS400, designed to prepare cadets for active duty as Air Force officers. Each course in the POC is designed as a weekly, three academic-hour course. Specific topics covered in the AS classes are as follows:

AS100 – Heritage and Values of the Air Force: Structure and missions of Air Force organizations, officership, and professionalism. Introduction to communication skills.

AS200 – Team and Leadership Fundamentals: Beginnings of crewed flight and the development of aerospace power from World War I to present-day current operations.

AS300 – Leading People and Effective Communication: Anatomy of leadership, role of discipline in leadership situations, and the variable affecting leadership. Case studies and practical application in Leadership Laboratory (LLAB). The current AS300 curriculum was previously taught as the AS400 curriculum until the 1990s, when it was shifted to the junior year.

AS400 – National Security Affairs/Preparation for Active Duty: The role of the professional military leaders in a democratic society, international developments on strategic preparedness, and active-duty assignment preparation. The National Security Studies portion of the current AS400 curriculum was previously taught as the AS300 curriculum until the 1990s, when it was shifted to the senior year.

The AS400 program previously included a single academic term Flight Instruction Program (FIP) private pilot ground school course taught by an aeronautically rated USAF officer on that AFROTC detachment's staff. This course was mandatory for all cadets slated for undergraduate pilot training on graduation who did not already hold an FAA private pilot certificate or higher and was optional for all other cadets. AFROTC cadets who lacked an FAA private pilot's certificate or higher initially received 38 flight hours of USAF-funded flight instruction in light aircraft from a civilian contractor near the college or university. In 1974, this was reduced to 25 flight hours, ensuring that these cadets were able to safely solo. With increasingly fewer aeronautically rated USAF officers assigned to AFROTC instructor positions and the subsequent establishment of Initial Flight Training (IFT) for all USAF 2d Lieutenants commissioned via USAFA, AFROTC, and OTS slated for undergraduate pilot training or undergraduate navigator training (now known as undergraduate combat systems officer training), FIP was eliminated from AFROTC in 1991.

== Leadership Laboratory (LLAB) ==
Leadership Laboratory (LLAB) is a weekly 2-hour pass/fail class that trains and prepares cadets for Field Training (FT), develops leadership skills, and promotes esprit de corps among all cadets. At some universities, credit hours may be given for completing LLAB; often universities only give credit hours for completing AS classes. For GMC cadets, LLAB provides new cadets with basic skills and knowledge to be a functional member of the cadet corps, prepares them in Warrior Knowledge and Drill and Ceremonies (marching), and teaches leadership, followership, and teamwork skills. For POC cadets, LLAB furthers leadership and followership skills learned at FT by planning and implementing the activities under the supervision of the active-duty cadre.

Specific LLAB activities are determined by the detachments themselves and thus vary across the nation. Some specific activities include: Field trips to Air Force bases and stations (to include Air Force Reserve and Air National Guard installations), Field Days, physical fitness tests and competitions, Drill and Ceremonies, leadership-building exercises, and Air Force officer career days.

== Scholarship programs ==
AFROTC offers a variety of highly competitive college scholarships, ranging from 3-year and 4-year scholarships offered to graduating high school seniors, 2-year and 3-year scholarships to college students enrolled as AFROTC cadets, and 2-, 3- and 4-year scholarships offered to enlisted military personnel.

AFROTC Scholarships offered to high school seniors are categorized as follows:

Type 1: Pays full college tuition, most fees and $900 per year for books. Approximately 5 percent of AFROTC four-year scholarship winners will be offered a Type 1 scholarship, mostly in technical fields such as engineering, chemistry, meteorology, applied mathematics or computer science.

AFROTC Scholarships offered to in-college students are as follows:

In-College Scholarship Program (ICSP): Open to college freshmen and sophomores in any major. Program is divided into two selection phases and awards-

ICSP Phase One: Open only to students enrolled in the Air Force ROTC program. Eligible applicants are nominated for ICSP Phase One by their school's AFROTC detachment commander. Nominees for each detachment are rank-ordered by the detachment commander based on their leadership ability, grades, fitness, and overall participation in the Air Force ROTC program. Headquarters AFROTC makes the final decision and awards scholarships. The nomination deadline is between 10 February and 28 February of each year.

All cadets selected through ICSP Phase One are awarded a Type 2 scholarship (capped at $18,000 per year for tuition, $600 per year for books).

Freshman nominees are awarded three-year scholarships and sophomore nominees are awarded two-year scholarships. All scholarships activate the following fall term.

ICSP Phase Two: Open to college freshman and sophomores in any major. ICSP Phase One nonselects and students not enrolled in Air Force ROTC are eligible to apply for ICSP Phase Two. Eligible applicants are nominated for ICSP Phase Two by the commander of the detachment serving the school where they attend or the school where they will attend once they join Air Force ROTC. Students not currently enrolled in Air Force ROTC must be interviewed by the detachment commander or his/her designee. The deadline for detachments to submit a nomination is 30 June. The board meets in July, and those selected are typically notified by 1 August of each year.

A limited number of cadets selected through ICSP Phase Two are awarded a Type 2 scholarship (capped at $18,000 per year for tuition, $600 per year for books). Most scholarship selected students are awarded a Type 3 scholarship (capped at $9,000 per year for tuition and $600 per year for books).

Freshmen nominees are awarded three-year scholarships, and sophomore nominees are awarded two-year scholarships. All scholarships activate the fall term following their distribution.

ICSP Phase Three: Depending on officer production and funding, a limited number of qualified sophomore ICSP Phase Two nonselects may be offered Type 6 scholarships. This process takes place at the same time ICSP Phase Two results are released.

Express Scholarship: Designed to meet Air Force ROTC officer production requirements in specific fields and year groups. This program awards Type 1 scholarships paying full college tuition, most fees and $600 per year for books. In many cases, these scholarships can activate during the same term as nomination. The Express Scholarship program is operated on a fully qualified basis. Those students who meet the qualifications are awarded the scholarship and do not meet a scholarship selection board. The processing of the scholarship award is completed at the local AFROTC detachment. Eligible majors are Computer Engineering, Electrical Engineering, Environmental Engineering and Meteorology.

Express Scholarship (Foreign Language): Designed to meet Air Force ROTC officer production requirements in specific fields and year groups. This program awards Type 1 scholarships paying full college tuition, most fees and $600 per year for books. In many cases, these scholarships can activate during the same term as nomination. The Express Scholarship (Foreign Language) program is operated on a fully qualified basis. Those students who meet the qualifications are awarded the scholarship and do not meet a scholarship selection board. The processing of the scholarship award is completed at the local AFROTC detachment. Eligible majors are: Arabic, Azerbaijani, Bengali, Cambodian, Chinese, Hausa, Hindi, Indonesian, Japanese, Kasakh, Kurdish, Malay, Pashtu, Persian-Iranian/Persian-Afghan, Russian, Serbo-Croatian, Swahili, Thai, Turkish, Uighur, Urdu/Punjabi, Uzbek and Vietnamese. Most candidates will eventually become USAF officers in the Intelligence career field.

Charles McGee Leadership Award (CMLA): This 2 year scholarship offers the same benefits of a Type 2 scholarship. Unlike the ISCP, this scholarship is unique in being offered to all qualified cadets who are not already on scholarship. New POC who satisfactorily complete Field Training will be offered the scholarship alongside their contract as a POC. This award can also be converted into a $10,000 per academic year "Housing Scholarship" that can be used to pay for on-campus housing.

AFROTC Scholarships offered to enlisted military personnel are as follows:

Airman Scholarship and Commissioning Program (ASCP): Successor program to the former BOOTSTRAP Program and Airman Education and Commissioning Program (AECP). ASCP permits active duty USAF airmen and junior non-commissioned officers to separate from active duty and receive a scholarship worth up to $18,000 per year while pursuing their commission through Air Force ROTC.

Professional Officer Course – Early Release Program (POC-ERP): Offers active duty Air Force enlisted personnel an opportunity for an early release from active duty to enter AFROTC and receive a commission as an Air Force officer. Members selected for POC-ERP will separate from active duty, sign a contract with AFROTC and become full-time college students. This program is open to undergraduate degrees only and cannot be used for postgraduate degrees. Upon completion of all undergraduate degree and commissioning requirements, cadets are commissioned as second lieutenants and returned to active duty in USAF for a period of at least four years, with longer service commitments required for those selected for flight training. POC-ERP is open to all academic majors. While in AFROTC, individuals will no longer receive military pay or benefits. All members applying for POC-ERP are required to provide proof that they have the financial means to make it through the program. Enlisted personnel selected for POC-ERP may use their Montgomery GI Bill benefits while in the program along with any additional grants or scholarships for which they may qualify.

Scholarships for Outstanding Airman to ROTC (SOAR): The SOAR program allows USAF enlisted personnel to separate from active duty and receive a scholarship worth up to $18,000 per year while pursuing their commission through AFROTC. Students may not pay the difference to attend higher-cost schools.

Nurse Enlisted Commissioning Program (NECP): The Nurse Enlisted Commissioning Program (NECP) offers active duty Air Force enlisted personnel the opportunity to earn a commission while completing their bachelor's degree in nursing. NECP students graduate, take the NCLEX, and then attend COT. Students will attend COT upon completion of their bachelor's degree and this will be their commissioning source. Those selected for NECP remain on active duty and are administratively assigned to an Air Force ROTC detachment. Their duty is to attend school as a full-time college student. NECP cadets may participate in the program for up to 24 consecutive months, depending on prior academic preparation and age limitations. During the program, they attend school year-round to include summer terms.

== Cadet organization ==
AFROTC classifies cadets into the following basic categories of training with respect to Field Training attendance and commissioning:

Basic Cadet (BC): Cadets who are part of the GMC but are not scheduled to attend FT the following summer. Normally AS100 cadets.

Basic Cadet Leader (BCL): Cadets scheduled to attend FT in the upcoming summer. Normally AS200 cadets, or if dual-enrolled in AS100 and AS200 classes, AS250 cadets.

Intermediate Cadet Leader (ICL): Cadets who have successfully completed FT but are not scheduled to commission in the upcoming year. Normally AS300 cadets.

Senior Cadet Leader (SCL): Cadets who have satisfactorily completed FT and are scheduled to be commissioned in the upcoming year. Normally AS400 cadets.

Extended Cadet Leader (ECL): Cadets who have completed the AFROTC curriculum but need additional time to complete their academic degree, such as 5-year engineering program students. Normally AS700 cadets or, if on scholarship, AS800 cadets.

Note, in September, 2024 Initial Military Training (IMT) and Field Training Preparation (FTP) were reclassified as Basic Cadet (BC) and Basic Cadet Leader (BCL), respectively.

A Cadet who has completed the first two years of academic classes but did not pass Field Training or attain a FT slot is an AS500 cadet.

Detachments organize cadets after the active-duty wing structure to the best of their ability, compensating for variable sizes and circumstances. GMC cadets participate as the underclassmen while the POC cadets participate as the upperclassmen. POC cadets have completed Field Training and are assigned leadership positions in the corps. Cadets are classified and assigned rank commensurate with their position and level of responsibility within the cadet wing and with respect to FT completion.

=== General Military Course ===
General Military Course cadets (formerly Cadet Airmen) are all cadets who have not satisfactorily completed Field Training. AS100 BC cadets hold the Cadet Fourth Class (C/4C) rank while AS200 BCL cadets hold Cadet Third Class Rank (C/3C). GMC cadets are not committed to joining the Air Force unless on AFROTC scholarship. If contracted, AS100 cadets receive a monthly tax-free stipend of $300 while AS200 cadets receive $350.

GMC cadets on contract are also considered to be inactive enlisted members in the Obligated Reserve Section (ORS) of the Air Force Reserve serving without pay. Their Air Force Reserve enlisted ranks will range from Airman Basic (AB, pay grade E-1) to Staff Sergeant (SSgt, pay grade E-5) with higher grades based on prior enlisted military experience in the Active Component or Reserve Component of the U.S. armed forces or other qualifying credentials (i.e., senior Civil Air Patrol cadets or former high school AFJROTC cadets with four years of participation enlisting at Airman First Class {A1C, E-3}, etc.).

=== Professional Officer Course ===
Professional Officer Course cadets (formerly Cadet Officers), AS300 (ICL), AS400 (SCL), and AS700 (ECL), are cadets who have satisfactorily completed Field Training or have received a Field Training deferment. POC cadets wear cadet officer rank (Cadet Second Lieutenant (C/2d Lt) – Cadet Colonel (C/Col)). Unlike the Air Force Academy, for juniors and seniors there is no rank of Cadet Second Class or Cadet First Class, respectively. With some exceptions, all POC cadets are considered to be "on contract" and are committed to being commissioned as officers in the Air Force or Space Force upon completion of their academic degree.

Like GMC cadets on contract, POC cadets are considered to be inactive enlisted members of the Air Force Reserve, serving without pay between the grades of E-1 and E-5, with said enlisted status terminating upon commissioning. However, POC cadets are not subject to the Uniform Code of Military Justice (UCMJ) and thus in strictly legal cases (such as sexual assault occurring within the cadet corps) they are considered as "civilians." As contracted cadets, AS300 cadets also receive a monthly tax-free stipend of $450 and AS400 cadets receive $500. POC cadets are required to meet USAF height and weight standards, pass the USAF Fitness Assessment (FA) each academic semester, and meet a minimum cumulative and term GPA requirement of 2.5. Repeatedly failing to meet any of these standards may result in disenrollment from AFROTC. All POC cadets must also hold at least one leadership position within the cadet wing or group as designated by the detachment cadre's Commandant of Cadets (COC).

In some cases, students with academic requirements that exceed four years (typically engineers and other technical majors in five-year programs) continue the AFROTC program for additional semesters as needed. During these additional years these cadets (AS700 or AS800, if on scholarship) are only minimally required to participate in LLAB and maintain retention standards. This is not the case for schools with co-op programs that entail a total of four years of classes and one year of cooperative experience. In these cases the cadets are classified as AS300's their first POC year and AS400's their second and third POC years. The cadets will not attend aerospace classes, Physical Training, or Leadership Lab during their co-op blocks (they will be on Periods of Non-Attendance) and otherwise complete the program like any four-year major.

=== Cadet Wing ===
The cadet wing (cadet group at smaller detachments) is organized to mirror the active-duty objective wing structure and is composed entirely of AFROTC cadets. Cadet rank is determined by the positions and levels of responsibility in which they hold. Cadet wings strive to include positions similar to those found in active-duty wings but additional positions may be added at the discretion of the detachment cadre's COC. Each wing is headed by a Cadet Colonel and has subsequent groups, squadrons, and flights. POC cadets rotate positions each semester and cannot hold the same position for two consecutive periods without approval. POC cadets are required to serve at least one term in a leadership position. Leadership positions include wing, group, squadron, and flight positions and others named by the CW/CC.

Cadet Fourth Class	C/4C	AS100
Cadet Third Class	C/3C	AS200/250/500
Cadet Second Lieutenant	C/2d Lt	POC
Cadet First Lieutenant	C/1st Lt	POC
Cadet Captain	C/Capt	POC
Cadet Major	C/Maj	POC
Cadet Lieutenant Colonel	C/Lt Col	POC
Cadet Colonel	C/Col	POC

== Physical Training (PT) ==
Cadets are required to take part in Physical Training (PT) at least twice per week each semester. Whether PT is counted as a school credit or not, attendance at PT (at least 80 percent) is required to pass Leadership Laboratory (LLAB). As a prerequisite, cadets must have a certified DoD physical or a sports physical on file at the detachment and must complete an AFROTC Physical Health Screening Questionnaire. Before the beginning of exercises, cadets receive a safety briefing on the "importance of hydration, heat stress disorders, and prompt reporting of any problems to a cadre member."

Under the supervision of qualified cadre, the PT program is organized and led by AS300 and AS400 cadets. PT activities at detachments may vary from sports games, Field Training Preparation training exercises, cardio and muscular strength exercises. PT sessions usually begin by forming up as a Wing and stretching.

The Fitness Assessment (FA) is taken by each cadet each semester and is formatted after the active-duty Air Force's FA. The FA is the primary instrument for evaluating the fitness level of each cadet. It is structured to assess the muscular endurance of specific muscle groups and the functional capacity of the cardiovascular system. Contracted cadets (i.e. those on scholarship/receiving stipend) must pass the FA. Contracted cadets that fail the FA are subject to discipline. Two consecutive failures can result in dismissal from the program. Non-contracted cadets must attempt the FA each semester. Within 72 hours of taking the FA, cadets have their height, waist, and weight measured to calculate body mass index (BMI). The FA consists of the BMI measurement, one minute of push-ups, one minute of sit-ups, and a 1.5-mile run. Maximum points for each area is 20 for BMI, 10 for push-ups, 10 for crunches, and 60 for the 1.5 mile run. To pass the FA, cadets must obtain a composite score of at least 75 and meet the minimum score requirements in each category.

== Field Training (FT) ==
Field Training is a training program that takes place the summer before cadets enter the POC. Completion of this boot camp-style training is a mandatory program for all individuals qualified to pursue an Air Force commission through AFROTC. All FTP cadets compete among each other nationwide during the spring semester to receive an EA (Enrollment Allocation), which allows them to progress to FT. Cadets who express interest in the Space Force will compete on a separate board for a Space Force EA. Cadets compete based on their Grade Point Average, Physical Fitness Assessment scores, and their ranking among other cadets in their class, as determined by the detachment commander. The number of EAs awarded is determined each year by the needs of the Air Force.

2008 marked the first year that all AFROTC Field Training Units (FTU) were held at the Officer Training School complex at Maxwell AFB, Alabama. This move reflects the Air Force's greater emphasis on expeditionary operations in combat zone and the Joint Force Training Center (JFTC) at Camp Shelby, Mississippi.

The Field Training program is designed to evaluate military leadership and discipline, determine the cadet's potential for entry into the Professional Officer Course (POC), and to stratify cadets amongst their peers. In-Garrison (11 days), and Vigilant Warrior is currently 3 days long, however the length may change depending on the year. FT is split up into two sections: In-Garrison (located at Maxwell AFB) and Air Expeditionary Force (located at the Vigilant Warrior Training Center near Titus, Alabama). The In-Garrison portion focuses on academics and drill & ceremonies, while AEF part focuses on Expeditionary Skills Training (EST) and deployment, respectively. With FT 2023, cadets with a Space Force EA will participate in Space Force specific training.

Field Training is commanded by an active duty USAF Colonel and a staff of approximately 55 active duty USAF officers, non-commissioned officers, and cadet training assistants (CTA). Active duty FT staff are typically selected from cadre at AFROTC detachments and serve in four to six-week rotations. "CTAs are POC cadets selected, based on their FT performance and overall cadet record, to return to Field Training as assistants to active duty staff members." There is one Flight Training Officer, one Non-Commissioned Officer, and one CTA assigned to each flight. In addition to flight CTAs, there are also traditional CTAs (who focus on Drill & Ceremonies, Physical Training, Public Affairs, and Standardization).

The 2020 Field Training period will have two Field Training Units (FTUs) instead of three, meaning staff will serve for three Field Trainings (also known as Maxwells or Maxes) instead of two.

In recent years, Field Training has been shortened in order to provide more time for Professional Development Training, also known as PDT, for activities such as base visits, internships, and other cadet development opportunities. While normally a two-week event, FT 2023 marked a 17-day program that includes PDT or incentive flights for selected cadets—giving insight into the daily operations of an AFSC.

In each flight, cadets are ranked from first to last. The top 10% earn the distinction of "Distinguished Graduate". The rest of the cadets are ranked in one of three divisions in their respective flight: top, middle, or bottom third. Various other awards are given for excelling at physical fitness and warrior spirit.

Cadets' rankings depend on the following criteria:

- Preparation for Field Training
- Fitness Assessment (FA)
- Leadership skills
- Professional qualities
- Communication skills
- Judgment/decision-making skills
- Warrior Ethos

Only the active duty officers evaluate and stratify the cadets. CTAs often give input but do not officially evaluate cadets. Cadets who are ranked among the top third or better in their flight are recommended for CTA duty and have the option to apply to become CTAs the following year.

FT 2023 marked the first year of the first Space Force Field Training graduates.

== Career / Air Force Specialty Code (AFSC) selection ==
=== General AFSCs ===
Prior to Field Training, AS200 Cadets will express preference in Air Force or Space Force career fields. Most cadets will apply for their initial AFSC career field towards the middle of their second semester in their AS 300 (junior) year. AFROTC cadets can apply for various career fields, to include aeronautically rated Pilot, Remotely Piloted Aircraft (RPA), Navigator/Combat Systems Officer and Air Battle Manager (ABM) slots, as well as non-rated slots such as Missile Operations or Missile Maintenance, Space Operations, Intelligence, Aircraft Maintenance, Meteorology, Civil Engineering, Security Forces, Admin/Personnel, etc. Cadets will be notified of their prospective AFSCs during the following semester, typically from as early as late August or as late as mid-September. The eventual duty station/ base of assignment for these various AFSCs will not be determined until midway through their final year in school.

=== Rated candidates ===
Cadets applying for rated slots, such as Pilot, RPA Pilot (MQ-9 Reaper), Navigator / Combat Systems Officer (CSO), and Air Battle Manager (ABM), will have the opportunity to apply no later than towards the end of the first semester of their second-to-last year (generally, the 1st semester of the academic junior year). These candidates will also be notified of their alternate AFSC (i.e., Intel, Space, Missiles, etc.) at the same time as all other cadets who applied for non-rated AFSCs. However, before candidates are eligible to apply for aeronautically rated positions, they must be medically qualified for their selection. There are different medical standards for pilots, nav/CSOs, and ABMs, respectively, with undergraduate pilot training medical requirements, primarily uncorrected eyesight, being the most stringent. Like OTS candidates, all AFROTC cadets must take the Air Force Officer Qualifying Test (AFOQT) prior to going on contract and must pass prior to commissioning. The Pilot Candidate Selection Method rating is a component of the Order of Merit, which allows the USAF to rank-order every single pilot candidate in AFROTC, and determine who gets what undergraduate pilot training (UPT) slot. While percentages are dictated by the AFROTC commander, the overall score consists of:

AFOQT Scores — The AFOQT contains Pilot and Navigator sections for prospective pilots and navs/CSOs.

Test of Basic Aviation Skills (TBAS) — Computerized test to determine candidate pilot aptitude.

Flight Hours — No flight hours are required, but higher flight hours result in higher scores up to 41 hours. This includes FAA-certified simulator hours.

Once the requirements are met for application, the candidates can apply at this time for specific flight training options at the following Air Education and Training Command (AETC) locations:

Pilots can opt for Euro-NATO Joint Jet Pilot Training (ENJJPT) with the 80th Flying Training Wing (80 FTW) at Sheppard AFB, Texas, which will take the top 9-10% of the pilot candidates that wish to pursue ENJJPT in lieu of traditional Specialized UPT (SUPT). ENJJPT selection is based solely off the Order of Merit scores and rank-order.

SUPT options include the 14th Flying Training Wing (14 FTW) at Columbus AFB, Mississippi; the 47th Flying Training Wing (47 FTW) at Laughlin AFB, Texas; and the 71st Flying Training Wing (71 FTW) at Vance AFB, Oklahoma.

A final pilot training option is the rotary-wing and tilt-rotor track via Undergraduate Helicopter Pilot Training (UHT) with the 23d Flying Training Squadron (23 FTS) at Fort Novosel, Alabama.

Combat Systems Officers, formerly known as Navigators, will receive their undergraduate CSO flight training with AETC's 479th Flying Training Group (479 FTG), a tenant USAF organization at Naval Air Station Pensacola, Florida.

Aeronautically rated candidates will be notified of their rated selection or denial during their second semester of their junior year. Base assignments, including ENJJPT assignment, will be given midway through their first semester of the last year in college. Those cadets who were selected for rated slots are then allowed to wear a flight suit during specified LLABs where the Operational Camouflage Pattern (OCP) is the Uniform of the Day, unless otherwise noted by the Cadet Wing Commander or Cadet Group Commander. Once selected, pilot-selected cadets will contract with the USAF for 10 years of active duty USAF service following completion of flight training, nav/CSO-selected and ABM-selected cadets will contract for 6 years of active duty following flight training, while cadets in all other AFSCs will contract for four years after commissioning.

Pilot candidates also undergo a Flying Class I physical and navigator/CSO candidates a Flying Class IA physical during the first semester of their last year. These are the most stringent physical exams given by the USAF. ABM candidates will undergo a Flying Class III physical exam. If a cadet with a rated slot is unable to pass their flight physical, they will instead be assigned to a non-rated career field.

==== Flight Indoctrination Program (FIP) ====
Prior to 1991, AFROTC also conducted a Flight Instruction Program (FIP) parallel to the Pilot Indoctrination Program (PIP) at USAFA. Although often touted as a means for AFROTC cadets to earn a free FAA Private Pilot Certificate while in college, the actual intent of the program was to provide an additional flight training screening process for prospective USAF pilot candidates who had no prior flight experience.

In AFROTC, FIP consisted of two blocks, the first being a private pilot ground school course taught by an aeronautically rated USAF officer assigned to the AFROTC detachment's cadre. The ground school course was also given an AS400 series designation and open to all AFROTC cadets in their senior year regardless of selection or non-selection for USAF undergraduate pilot training. Cadets who had prior civilian flight training and/or civilian pilot certifications could also enroll in the FIP ground school and the course was also offered as option for Army ROTC cadets, Naval ROTC (NROTC) midshipmen on both Navy and Marine Corps commissioning tracks, Naval Aviation Reserve Officer Candidates (AVROC) and Marine Corps Platoon Leaders Class-Air (Marine PLC-Air) officer candidates slated for flight training in their respective services following graduation.

The flying portion of FIP was typically conducted by civilian instructors under USAF contract at a nearby civilian airport, normally employing light general aviation aircraft such as the Cessna 150 / Cessna 152 series, Cessna 172, Piper Cherokee, or other similar aircraft. Since FIP was designed as a washout/attrition device, AFROTC cadets who already held an FAA Private Pilot's Certificate or greater were not eligible for any actual flight time via FIP. Those cadets without prior flight experience initially received 38 flight hours, but post-Vietnam War defense cutbacks in the mid-1970s resulted in FIP being reduced to a "safe for solo" program with 25 hours of funded flight time. FIP was discontinued in 1991 when it was replaced by the single-site Enhanced Flight Screening Program (EFSP) at Hondo, Texas.

==== Initial Flight Training (IFT) and Navigator Introductory Flight Training (NIFT) ====
With the demise of FIP and PIP in 1991, the 12th Flying Training Wing (12 FTW) at Randolph AFB, Texas initially assumed responsibility for the Enhanced Flight Screening Program (EFSP) of all candidates for UPT from all USAF commissioning sources (AFROTC, USAFA and OTS). This training was conducted for these officers following graduation and commissioning at Hondo Municipal Airport, Texas in T-41 Mescalero and T-3 Firefly aircraft until 1998. Following several fatal mishaps with the T-3 Firefly, the program was transferred from the 12 FTW to a civilian contract operation under AETC auspices at Pueblo Memorial Airport, Colorado.

The Pueblo program employs civilian Diamond DA-20 aircraft and is officially known as Initial Flight Training (IFT) for USAF specialized undergraduate pilot trainees and Navigator Introductory Flight Training (NIFT) for USAF specialized undergraduate navigator/CSO trainees.

== Ribbons ==
AFROTC ribbons are awarded for many various achievements. The complete list is below as per AFROTCVA 36-3, 4 May.

== Badges and pins ==
Cadet Pilot Badge

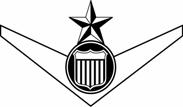
Cadet Senior Pilot Badge

Cadet Navigator Badge

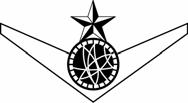
Cadet Senior Navigator Badge

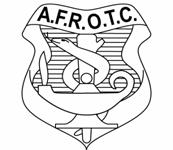
Cadet Nurse Badge

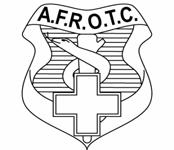
Cadet Pre-Health Badge

Cadet Training Assistant Badge

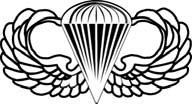
Parachutist Badge

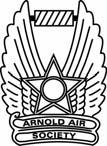
Arnold Air Society Member Pin (AAS C/2d/1st Lt rank)

Arnold Air Society Candidate Pin

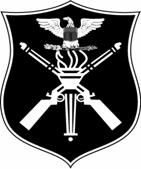
Pershing Rifles Member Pin

In addition, cadets who have completed Advanced Course in Engineering (ACE) or have attended AFIT courses on information assurance are authorized to wear the Cadet Master Cyber Badge.

== Notable Air Force ROTC graduates ==
- B. Chance Saltzman, Chief of Space Operations – Boston University
- James P. Fleming, Medal of Honor Recipient; Colonel, USAF (ret.) – Washington State University
- Jimmie V. Adams, former Commander, Pacific Air Forces (PACAF); General, USAF (ret.) – Auburn University
- Michael P. Anderson, Astronaut; Lieutenant Colonel, USAF (deceased) – University of Washington
- Rudolf Anderson Jr, U-2 pilot during (and only casualty of) the Cuban Missile Crisis, first Air Force Cross recipient (posthumous); Major, USAF (Deceased) – Clemson University
- Ricardo Aponte, Brigadier General, USAFR (ret.) – University of Puerto Rico
- Andrew Armacost, Dean of Faculty, United States Air Force Academy, Brigadier General, USAF – Northwestern University
- Robert Armfield, Brigadier General, USAF, Vice Director, Strategy, Plans and Policy on the staff of U.S. Central Command at MacDill Air Force Base, Florida. The Citadel, The Military College of South Carolina
- Joseph W. Ashy, former Commander, U.S. Space Command (USSPACECOM) and North American Aerospace Defense Command (NORAD); General, USAF (ret.) – Texas A&M University
- George T. Babbitt Jr., former Commander, Air Force Materiel Command (AFMC);, General, USAF (ret.) – University of Washington
- Dr. Thomas P. Ball, Commander, Joint Military Medical Command, Major General, USAF (ret.) – The Citadel, The Military College of South Carolina
- Charles B. DeBellevue, ranking fighter ace during Vietnam War and Air Force Cross recipient; Colonel, USAF (ret.) – University of Southwestern Louisiana
- Steven L. Bennett, Medal of Honor recipient (posthumous); Captain, USAF (deceased) – University of Louisiana at Lafayette
- Gerald A. Black, Commander 349th Air Mobility Wing, Brigadier General, USAFR (ret.) – The Citadel, The Military College of South Carolina
- Casey Blake, Deputy Assistant Secretary for Contracting, Office of the Assistant Secretary of the Air Force for Acquisition, Major General, USAF – The Citadel, The Military College of South Carolina
- Guion Bluford, Astronaut; Colonel, USAF (ret.) – Penn State University
- Billy J. Boles, former Commander, Air Education and Training Command (AETC); General, USAF (ret.) – North Carolina State University
- Claude M. Bolton, Assistant Secretary of the Army for Acquisition, Logistics and Technology; former Commander, Air Force Security Assistance Center; Major General, USAF (ret.) – University of Nebraska–Lincoln
- John A. Bradley, former Chief of Air Force Reserve and Commander, Air Force Reserve Command (AFRC); Lieutenant General, USAFR (ret.) – University of Tennessee at Knoxville
- Roger A. Brady, former Commander, U.S. Air Forces in Europe (USAFE); General, USAF (ret.) – University of Oklahoma
- Philip M. Breedlove, Commander, U.S. European Command, and 17th Supreme Allied Commander Europe (SACEUR) of NATO Allied Command Operations, General, USAF – Georgia Tech
- Charles Q. Brown, Jr., General, USAF, 22nd Chief of Staff of the Air Force and 21st Chairman of the Joint Chiefs of Staff - Texas Tech University
- Mark N. Brown, Astronaut; Colonel, USAF (ret.) – Purdue University
- Frank B. Campbell, Director J-5, Joint Chiefs of Staff; former Commander 12th Air Force and U.S. Southern Command Air Forces, Lieutenant General, USAF (ret.) – The Citadel, The Military College of South Carolina
- Bruce Carlson, Director, National Reconnaissance Office (NRO); former Commander, Air Force Materiel Command (AFMC); General, USAF (ret.) – University of Minnesota Duluth
- Duane G. Carey, Astronaut; Lieutenant Colonel, USAF (ret.) – University of Minnesota
- John T. Chain Jr., former Commander, Strategic Air Command (SAC); General, USAF (ret.) – Denison University
- James R. Clapper Jr., Director of National Intelligence; former director, Defense Intelligence Agency (DIA); Lieutenant General, USAF (ret.) – University of Maryland, College Park
- Catherine Coleman, Astronaut; Colonel, USAF (ret.) – Massachusetts Institute of Technology
- Eileen Collins, Astronaut and first female Space Shuttle Commander; Colonel, USAF (ret.) – Syracuse University
- J. Quincy Collins, F-105 pilot, captured in Vietnam, served as a Prisoner of War (POW) in the "Hanoi Hilton" for 7 1/2 years; his cellmate was John McCain 2008 Republican Presidential Nominee, Colonel, USAF (ret.) – The Citadel, The Military College of South Carolina
- Donald G. Cook, former Commander, Air Education and Training Command (AETC); General, USAF (ret.) – Michigan State University
- Lee Cooke, former mayor of Austin, Texas, Captain, USAF – Louisiana Tech University
- John B. Cooper, Deputy Chief of Staff for Logistics, Engineering and Force Protection, Headquarters U.S. Air Force, Lieutenant General, USAF – The Citadel, The Military College of South Carolina
- William B. Davidson, Administrative Assistant to the Secretary of the Air Force, Senior Executive Service; Colonel, USAF (ret.) – Florida State University
- Roger G. DeKok, former Vice Commander, Air Force Space Command (AFSPC); Lieutenant General, USAF (ret., deceased)
- David A. Deptula, Deputy Chief of Staff for Intelligence, Surveillance and Reconnaissance (A2), HQ USAF; Lieutenant General, USAF – University of Virginia
- William J. Elander, former USAF Thunderbirds Demonstration Pilot, captured and was tortured at the "Hanoi Hilton" in Vietnam, Lieutenant Colonel, USAF (ret.) – The Citadel, The Military College of South Carolina
- Joseph Henry Engle, Astronaut; Colonel, USAF (ret.) – University of Kansas
- John M. Fabian, Astronaut; Colonel, USAF (ret.) – Washington State University
- Ed Fienga, Deputy Assistant Secretary for Programs, Office of the Assistant Secretary of the Air Force for Financial Management and Comptroller; Brigadier General, USAF – The Citadel, The Military College of South Carolina
- Michael Fincke, Astronaut; Colonel, USAF – Massachusetts Institute of Technology
- Bernard Francis Fisher, Medal of Honor recipient; Colonel, USAF (ret.) – University of Utah
- Robert H. Foglesong, former president of Mississippi State University; former Commander, U.S. Air Forces in Europe (USAFE); General, USAF (ret.) – West Virginia University
- Michael E. Fossum, Astronaut; Colonel, USAFR – Texas A&M University
- William M. Fraser III, Commander, Air Combat Command (ACC); General, USAF – Texas A&M University
- Patrick K. Gamble, former Commander, Pacific Air Forces (PACAF); General, USAF (ret.) – Texas A&M University
- Jim Geringer, former governor of Wyoming; former Captain, USAF – Kansas State University
- John A. Gordon, former Deputy Director of Central Intelligence, Central Intelligence Agency (CIA); General, USAF (ret.) – University of Missouri
- Irwin P. Graham, former Deputy Chief of Staff Plans, Pacific Air Forces (PACAF); Major General, USAF (ret.) – The Citadel, The Military College of South Carolina
- Lindsey Graham, US Senator from South Carolina (R-SC); Colonel, USAFR – University of South Carolina
- George A. Gray III, Commander 438th Airlift Wing, Brigadier General, USAF (ret.) – The Citadel, The Military College of South Carolina
- Jack I. Gregory, former Commander, Pacific Air Forces (PACAF); General, USAF (ret.) – University of Kentucky
- Phil Hardberger, former mayor of San Antonio, Texas; former captain, USAF – Texas Tech University
- Henry Hartsfield, Astronaut; Colonel, USAF (ret.) – Auburn University
- Michael Hayden, former director, Central Intelligence Agency (CIA) and former director, National Security Agency (NSA); General, USAF (ret.) – Duquesne University
- Guy L. Hecker, former director of the Office of Legislative Liaison, Office of the Secretary of the Air Force, Washington, D.C., Major General, USAF (ret.) – The Citadel, The Military College of South Carolina
- Paul V. Hester, former Commander, Pacific Air Forces (PACAF); General, USAF (ret.) – University of Mississippi
- Van Hilleary, US Congressman from Tennessee (R-TN); Colonel, USAFR – University of Tennessee
- Hal M. Hornburg, former Commander, Air Combat Command (ACC); General, USAF (ret.) – Texas A&M University
- Charles A. Horner, former Commander, U.S. Space Command (USSPACECOM) and North American Aerospace Defense Command (NORAD); commanded U.S. and Allied/Coalition air operations during Operation Desert Shield and Desert Storm; General, USAF (ret.) – University of Iowa
- Gilmary Michael Hostage III, Commander, U.S. Air Forces Central Command (USAFCENT); Lieutenant General, USAF – Duke University
- Kristin Hubbard, Advance Pilot/Narrator (Thunderbird #8), USAF Air Demonstration Squadron/United States Air Force Thunderbirds; Captain, USAF – University of Washington
- Andrew P. Iosue, former Commander, Air Training Command (ATC); General, USAF (ret.) – University of Massachusetts
- John P. Jumper, former Air Force Chief of Staff; former Commander, Air Combat Command (ACC); former Commander, U.S. Air Forces in Europe (USAFE); General, USAF (ret.) – Virginia Military Institute
- Robert Kehler, Commander, Air Force Space Command (AFSPC); General, USAF – Pennsylvania State University
- Ronald E. Keys, former Commander, Air Combat Command (ACC); General, USAF (ret.) – Kansas State University
- James M. Kowalski, Commander, Air Force Global Strike Command; Lieutenant General, USAF – University of Cincinnati
- Lance A. Kildron, former Commander, 77th Fighter Squadron; Colonel, USAF – Louisiana Tech University
- David A. Krumm, Commander Alaskan Command; Lieutenant General, USAF - Auburn University
- Daniel P. Leaf, former Deputy Commander, U.S. Pacific Command (USPACOM); Lieutenant General, USAF (ret.) – University of Wisconsin–Madison
- Timothy Leahy, Commander, Curtis E. LeMay Center for Doctrine Development and Education, and Vice Commander, Air University; Major General The Citadel, The Military College of South Carolina
- Arthur J. Lichte, former Commander, Air Mobility Command (AMC); General, USAF (ret.) – Manhattan College
- Lance W. Lord, former Commander, Air Force Space Command (AFSPC); former Commander, Air University (AU); General, USAF (ret.) – Otterbein College
- Lester Lyles, former Commander, Air Force Materiel Command (AFMC); General, USAF (ret.) – Howard University
- Charles W. Lyon, Director of Operations, Air Combat Command; Commander, Air Forces Afghanistan; Major General, USAF – The Citadel, The Military College of South Carolina
- Antonio Maldonado, former Chief, Office of Defense Cooperation – Madrid, Spain; Brigadier General, USAF (ret.) – University of Puerto Rico
- James P. McCarthy, former Deputy Commander, U.S. European Command (USEUCOM); former Commander, 8th Air Force; General, USAF (ret.)- Kent State University
- Pamela Melroy, Astronaut; Colonel, USAF (ret.) – Wellesley College (commissioned via AFROTC Det 365 at Massachusetts Institute of Technology)
- Richard L. Meyer, Vice Commander 12th Air Force, Brigadier General, USAF (ret.) – The Citadel, The Military College of South Carolina
- Charles C. McDonald, former Commander, Air Force Logistics Command (AFLC); General, USAF (ret.) – University of Wisconsin–Madison
- Craig R. McKinley, Chief of the National Guard Bureau (NGB), former director, Air National Guard (ANG) and former Commander, 1st Air Force; General, USAF – Southern Methodist University
- Richard W. McKinney, Senior Executive Service; Deputy Under Secretary of the Air Force for Space Programs; Colonel, USAF (ret.) – Washington State University
- Merrill A. McPeak, former Chief of Staff of the Air Force and former Commander, Pacific Air Forces (PACAF); General, USAF (ret.) – San Diego State
- Richard O. Middleton, Mobilization Assistant to the Director of Logistics, Air Mobility Command (AMC); Brigadier General, USAFR – The Citadel, The Military College of South Carolina
- Kenneth Minihan, former director, National Security Agency (NSA); Lieutenant General, USAF (ret.) – Florida State University
- Mike Minihan, former Commander, Air Mobility Command (AMC); General, USAF (ret.) - Auburn University
- Thomas S. Moorman Jr., former vice chief of staff of the Air Force and former commander, Air Force Space Command (AFSPC); General, USAF (ret.) – Dartmouth College
- T. Michael Moseley, former chief of staff of the Air Force, former vice chief of staff of the Air Force, and former commander, 9th Air Force; commanded U.S. and Allied air operations during Operation Enduring Freedom and Iraqi Freedom; General, USAF (ret.) – Texas A&M University
- Richard B. Myers, former chairman of the Joint Chiefs of Staff; former commander, U.S. Space Command (USSPACECOM) and North American Aerospace Defense Command (NORAD); former Commander, Pacific Air Forces (PACAF); General, USAF (ret.) – Kansas State University
- Lloyd W. Newton, former Commander, Air Education and Training Command (AETC); first African-American U.S. Air Force Thunderbirds pilot, General, USAF (ret.) – Tennessee State University
- Gary L. North – Commander, Pacific Air Forces (PACAF); General, USAF – East Carolina University
- Scott O'Grady, Major, USAFR – Embry-Riddle Aeronautical University (Prescott, Arizona campus)
- Ellison Onizuka, Astronaut (Killed in Space Shuttle Challenger, STS-51-L disaster), Colonel, USAF (deceased) – University of Colorado at Boulder
- Samuel C. Phillips, former Commander, Air Force Systems Command (AFSC) and former director, National Security Agency (NSA); General, USAF (ret., deceased) – University of Wyoming
- Richard A. Platt, former ANG Mobilization Assistant to the Commander, U.S. Air Forces in Europe (USAFE); Major General, USAF / Air National Guard (ret.) – New Jersey Institute of Technology
- Joseph W. Ralston, former Commander, U.S. European Command (USEUCOM) and former commander, Air Combat Command (ACC); General, USAF (ret.) – Miami University
- Antonio J. Ramos, former Commander, Air Force Security Assistance Center; Brigadier General, USAF (ret.) – University of Puerto Rico
- Thomas C. Richards, former Deputy Commander, U.S. European Command (USEUCOM) and former commander, Air University (AU); General, USAF (ret.) – Virginia Polytechnic Institute
- Cesar "Rico" Rodriguez, F-15 pilot with 2 aerial victories during Desert Storm in 1991, one MIG kill over Kosovo 1999, the fighter pilot with the most victories since Vietnam, Colonel, USAF (ret.) – The Citadel, The Military College of South Carolina
- Marc E. Rogers, Inspector General of the Air Force; Lieutenant General, USAF – University of Missouri
- John W. Rosa, former Superintendent U.S. Air Force Academy; Lieutenant General, USAF (ret.) – The Citadel, The Military College of South Carolina
- Mark Rosenker, former Mobilization Assistant to the Secretary of the Air Force, former MA to the Commander, Air Force Reserve Command, Major General USAF (ret)- University of Maryland
- Robert D. Russ, former commander, Tactical Air Command (TAC); General, USAF (ret., deceased) – Washington State University
- Robert L. Rutherford, former Commander, U.S. Transportation Command (USTRANSCOM) and former commander, Air Mobility Command (AMC); General, USAF (ret.) – Southwest Texas State University
- John B. Sams Jr., former Vice Commander, Air Mobility Command, Commander, 15th Air Force; Lieutenant General, USAF (ret.) – The Citadel, The Military College of South Carolina
- Ellie G. "Buck" Shuler Jr., former Commander 8th Air Force, Lieutenant General, USAF (ret.) – The Citadel, The Military College of South Carolina
- James C. Slife, former Vice Chief of Staff of the United States Air Force; General, USAF (ret.) - Auburn University
- David Lamar Smith, F-4 pilot with 353 combat missions in Vietnam, pilot in first USAF Aggressor Squadron, Commander and Flight Leader of the Thunderbirds; Lieutenant Colonel, USAF – The Citadel, The Military College of South Carolina
- Charles F. Wald, former Deputy Commander, U.S. European Command (USEUCOM); General, USAF (ret.) – North Dakota State University
- Claudius E. Watts III, former Comptroller, U.S. Air Force, former college President, Lieutenant General, USAF (ret.) – The Citadel, The Military College of South Carolina
- Walter E. Webb III, Director for operations, Defense Nuclear Agency, Washington, D.C.; Major General, USAF (ret.) – The Citadel, The Military College of South Carolina
- William Welser III, former Commander, 18th Air Force; Lieutenant General, USAF (ret.) – University at Buffalo
- Scott D. West, Vice Commander 13th Air Force, Pacific Air Forces (PACAF); Brigadier General, USAF – The Citadel, The Military College of South Carolina
- Wallace W. Whaley, Commander 4th Air Force; Assistant to the Commander, Air Force Reserve; Major General, USAFR (ret) – The Citadel, The Military College of South Carolina
- Randy Witt, Director of command, control, communications and computer systems, U.S. European Command (USEUCOM); Brigadier General, USAF (ret.) – The Citadel, The Military College of South Carolina
- John L. Wilkinson, Mobilization Assistant to the Director of Intelligence, Surveillance and Reconnaissance, Deputy Chief of Staff for Air and Space Operations, HQ USAF; Mobilization Assistant to the Commander, Air Intelligence Agency; Brigadier General, USAFR (ret.) – Georgetown University
- Margaret H. Woodward, Vice Commander, 18th Air Force and Prospective Commander, 17th Air Force; Brigadier General (Major General selectee), USAF – Arizona State University
- Kenneth S. Wilsbach, Commander, Pacific Air Forces; General, USAF – University of Florida
- Ronald D. Yaggi, Director, Regional Affairs, Office of the Deputy Under Secretary of the Air Force for International Affairs; Air Force member, Delegation to Inter-American Defense Board; and Air Force member, Joint Mexico-U.S. Defense Commission, Brigadier General, USAF (ret.) – The Citadel, The Military College of South Carolina

== Resources ==
- AFROTC HQ official website

== See also ==
- Army Reserve Officers' Training Corps
- Early Commissioning Program
- Naval Reserve Officers Training Corps
- Air Force Officer Training School
- Army University
- General US military ROTC overview
