= James P. McCarthy =

United States Air Force general

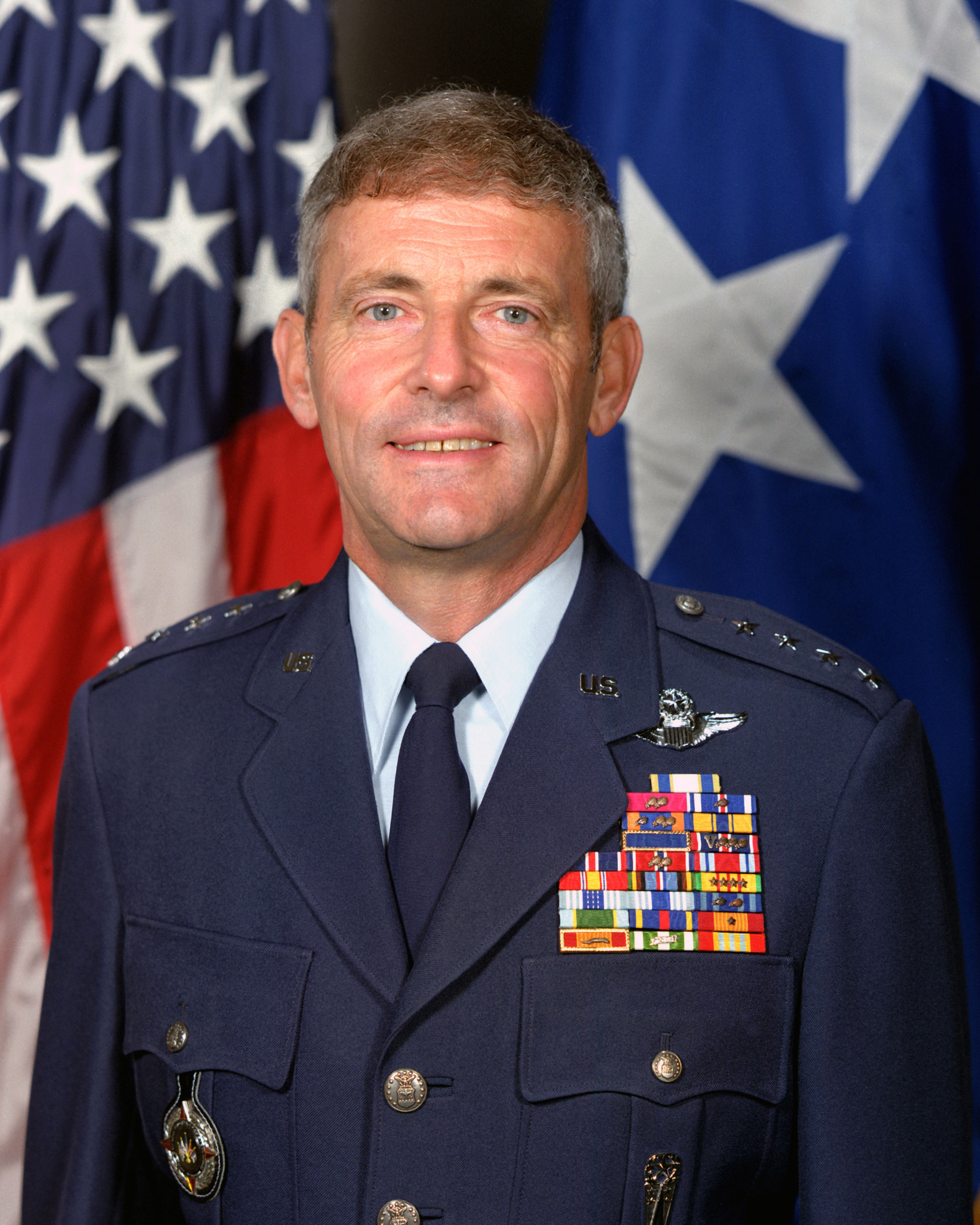
- Official portrait as Deputy Commander in Chief, United States European Command
- Born: 7 March 1935 (age 91); Canton, Ohio
- Military career
- Allegiance: United States
- Branch: United States Air Force
- Service years: 1957–1990
- Rank: General
- Commands: 4th Tactical Fighter Squadron; 8th Air Force; Commander in Chief European Command
- Conflicts: Cold War; Vietnam War

James P. McCarthy (born 7 March 1935) is a retired United States Air Force general. His last assignment before retirement was as Deputy Commander in Chief of the United States European Command. In retirement, McCarthy has served on a number of corporate and government advisory boards, as well as serving as the ARDI Professor of National Security at the United States Air Force Academy.

== Biography ==
=== Early life ===
McCarthy was born in 1935 in Canton, Ohio, where he graduated from Lincoln High School.

He was commissioned through the Reserve Officer Training Corps program in 1957 after graduating his Bachelor of Science degree from Kent State University. He completed pilot training at Graham Air Force Base, Florida, and Greenville Air Force Base, Mississippi, and was awarded pilot wings in June 1959. He was then assigned to the 301st Bombardment Wing, Lockbourne Air Force Base, Ohio, as a B-47 Stratojet pilot. He completed Squadron Officer School in 1963.

In June 1964, he was assigned to the United States Air Force Academy, Colorado, as an air officer commanding, with responsibility for advising and assisting a squadron of cadets in their training. While at the Academy, McCarthy established the cadet soaring program and served as its first officer in charge. In June 1967, he began F-4 Phantom II fighter training and was assigned as a pilot and operations officer with the 80th Tactical Fighter Squadron, Yokota Air Base, Japan. During his two years there, his squadron was deployed to Osan Air Base, South Korea, during several international incidents.

=== Later Air Force career ===
The general transferred to the 366th Tactical Fighter Wing at Da Nang Air Base, Republic of Vietnam, in May 1970 as chief of the Operations Plans Division. In December 1970 he became commander of the 4th Tactical Fighter Squadron at Da Nang Air Base. He flew 152 combat missions in the F-4E Phantom II.

McCarthy returned to the United States in June 1971 and was assigned to the Office of the Director of Programs, Headquarters United States Air Force, Washington D.C. That same year, he graduated from the Industrial College of the Armed Forces. He was responsible for basing Air Force units both overseas and in the United States. In August 1973, he entered the National War College and, after graduating in August 1974, became the vice commandant of cadets at the United States Air Force Academy. Part of his responsibilities included directing the academy's preparation for the initial admission of women in July 1976. He received a Master of Science degree in international affairs from George Washington University in 1974. He transferred to the 97th Bombardment Wing, Blytheville Air Force Base, Arkansas., in March 1977 as vice commander and became commander in September 1978. In March 1979, the general was named commander of the 93rd Bombardment Wing at Castle Air Force Base, California.

In May 1980, he returned to Air Force headquarters as special assistant for M-X matters, Office of the Deputy Chief of Staff for Research, Development and Acquisition. He was responsible for the M-X program and directed the program through most of its concept formulation phase. In October 1982, he became the director of legislative liaison, Office of the Secretary of the Air Force, Washington D.C. In that position, he advised the Secretary and all principal civilian and military officials of the Department of the Air Force concerning legislative affairs and congressional relations.

In July 1984, he transferred to Headquarters Strategic Air Command, Offutt Air Force Base, Nebraska, where he served as deputy chief of staff for plans, developing policies, programs and requirements for the command. The general assumed command of 8th Air Force, Barksdale Air Force Base, Louisiana, in January 1987, and was responsible for SAC operations in the eastern half of the United States, Europe and the Middle East. He was next assigned as deputy chief of staff for programs and resources, Air Force headquarters, in March 1988, responsible for Air Force programming, manpower and foreign military sales. He assumed his final position as commander of the United States European Command in September 1989.

He was promoted to general on 1 October 1989, with same date of rank. He retired on 30 November 1992.

=== Post-military life ===
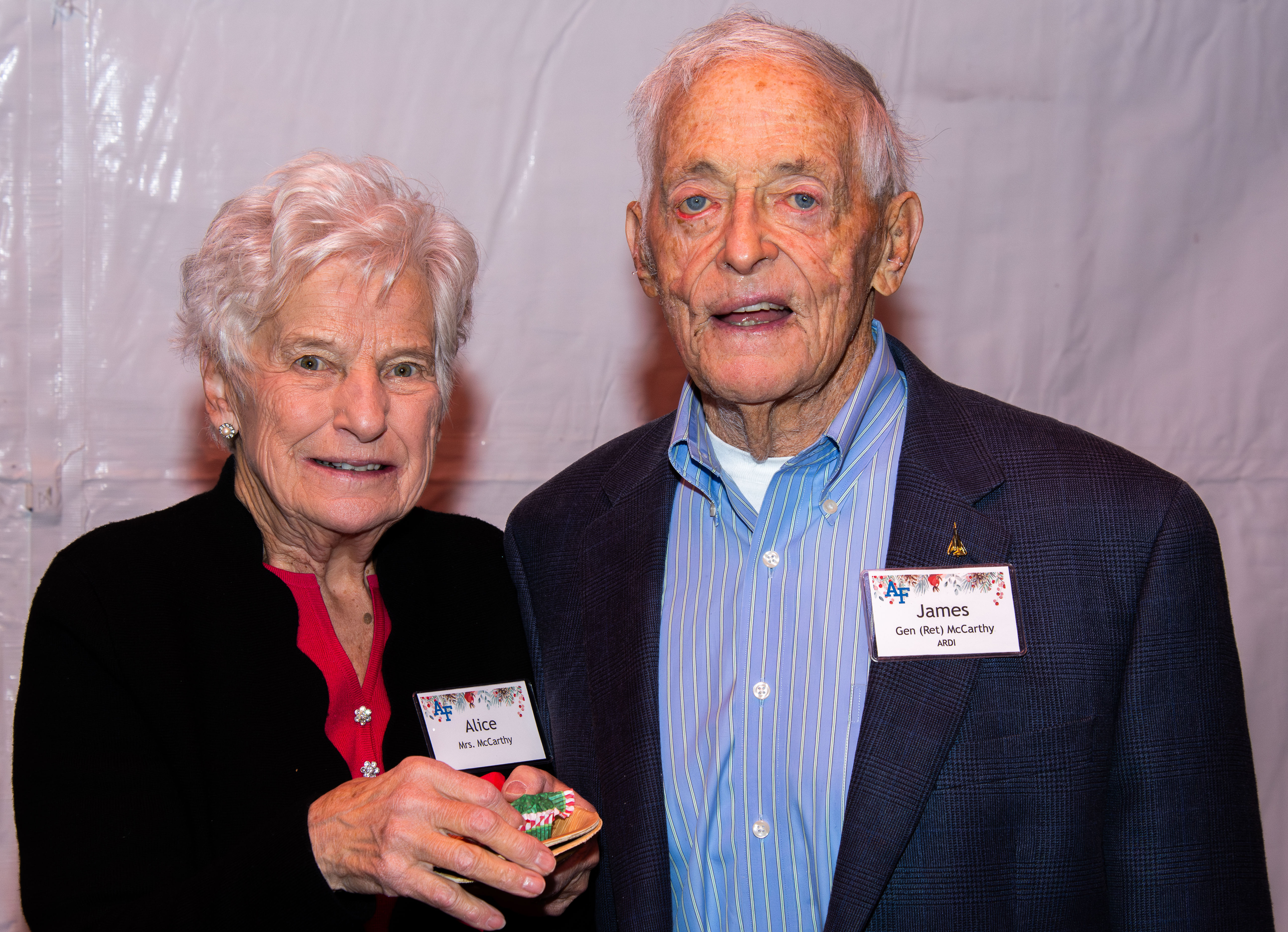
McCarthy (right) and his wife, Alice, c. 2022

During his retirement, he has written a number of books. He has also become the ARDI Professor of National Security in the political science department at the United States Air Force Academy. He is currently a member of the Defense Science Board. He also has served on the board of directors of EADS North America, ISX, NAVSYS, and been a member of the United States Air Force Scientific Advisory Board.

== Awards ==
Awards earned during his career:

- Defense Distinguished Service Medal
- Air Force Distinguished Service Medal
- Legion of Merit with two oak leaf clusters
- Air Medal with seven oak leaf clusters
- Air Force Commendation Medal
- Presidential Unit Citation
- Air Force Outstanding Unit Award with a "V" device and five oak leaf clusters
- Air Force Organizational Excellence Award with two oak leaf clusters
- Combat Readiness Medal
- National Defense Service Medal with a service star
- Armed Forces Expeditionary Medal
- Vietnam Service Medal with four service stars
- Air Force Longevity Service Award Ribbon with six oak leaf clusters
- Small Arms Expert Marksmanship Ribbon
- Republic of Vietnam Gallantry Cross with a Gold Palm
- Republic of Vietnam Armed Forces Honor Medal
- Republic of Vietnam Campaign Medal
- Command pilot with more than 6,000 flying hours in 28 aircraft
