= Military Psychology (journal) =

- Discipline: Military psychology
- Language: English
- Edited by: Armando X. Estrada

Publication details
- History: 1989-present
- Publisher: American Psychological Association (United States)
- Frequency: Bimonthly
- Impact factor: 0.819 (2019)

Standard abbreviations
- ISO 4: Mil. Psychol.

Indexing
- ISSN: 0899-5605 (print); 1532-7876 (web)
- LCCN: 89647381
- OCLC no.: 45007137

Links
- Journal homepage; Online access

Military Psychology is a peer-reviewed academic journal published by the American Psychological Association on behalf of APA Division 19. The journal covers psychological research or practice in a military context, including clinical and health psychology, training and human factors, manpower and personnel, social and organizational systems, and testing and measurement. The current editor-in-chief is Armando X. Estrada (Washington State University Vancouver).

== Abstracting and indexing ==
The journal is abstracted and indexed in:

- Cambridge Scientific Abstracts
- CSA Health & Safety Science Abstracts
- Cumulative Index to Nursing and Allied Health Literature
- Current Contents/Social & Behavioral Sciences
- Ergonomics Abstracts
- ProQuest
- PsycINFO
- Scopus
- Social Sciences Citation Index

According to the Journal Citation Reports, the journal has a 2016 impact factor of 0.734, ranking it 91st out of 128 journals in the category "Psychology, Multidisciplinary".
