= Test of Basic Aviation Skills =

The Test of Basic Aviation Skills (TBAS) is a computerized psychomotor test battery used as a tool for the selection of United States Air Force pilot candidates. It was created as a replacement for the Basic Attributes Test (BAT) which was in use from 1993 to 2006. TBAS scores are combined with the candidate's Air Force Officer Qualifying Test (AFOQT) scores, and flying hours to produce a Pilot Candidate Selection Method (PCSM) score. The PCSM score provides a measure of a candidate's aptitude for pilot training and is a significant part of the selection process. As of August 14, 2006 the TBAS is operational at all testing sites and the BAT has been retired.

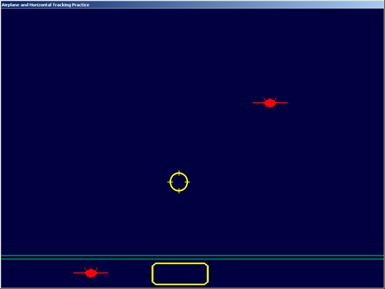
Reduced screenshot of a TBAS subtest

== Development and Field Testing ==
In 1999, the Air Education and Training Command directed the Studies and Analysis Squadron to develop a new skills battery to incorporate the latest advances in psychomotor and cognitive research. The Studies and Analysis Squadron partnered with the Naval Aerospace Medical Research Laboratory and the US Air Force Academy to develop the TBAS as a possible BAT replacement.

The Air Force Research Laboratory, released a report on the "Development and Validation of the Test of Basic Aviation Skills (TBAS) " in November 2005. According to the report, the TBAS was fielded to 994 Air Force pilot trainees. The testing showed strong correlations between TBAS scores and potential success at pilot training. TBAS equipment was shipped to testing locations by July 2006 and was operational at all sites on August 14, 2006.

The test equipment consists of a computer, keyboard, mouse, joystick, rudder pedals, and headphones. During the validation of the TBAS the test apparatus was:

a 2.80 GHz CPU computer with 512 MB RAM and a 40 GB hard drive, CD ROM and USD port removable media storage devices, and a Microsoft Windows XP operating system. The monitor was a 17-inch flat panel with 0.264 pixel pitch, 1280 by 1024 pixel resolution, and a sync rate of 56 Hz by 75 Hz (vertical by horizontal). The control stick was a ThrustmasterTM Model Hotas Cougar and the rudder pedals were CH ProductsTM Pro Pedals. The computer hardware was housed in a wooden carrel to provide a standardized test environment and reduce distractions.

Whether the same equipment has been deployed at all testing sites remains unclear.

== Test Structure ==
The TBAS is composed of 9 subtests each of which either introduces a new skill area or tests a combination of the previous skill areas. Total time to administer the test is less than one hour.

=== Directional Orientation Test ===
"Measures spatial orientation abilities: The participant must determine a UAV’s position relative to a target. The test simultaneously presents a "tracker map” which shows the location and heading of the UAV; and a forward field of view, as seen through a fixed, forward pointing camera of a UAV, which shows a single building surrounded by four parking lots. The task is to click on the parking lot that a computer generated voice instructs. There are 48 questions."

=== 3-Digit and 5-Digit Listening Tests ===
"Participants are presented with auditory letters and numbers. They must squeeze the trigger when they hear any of the three or five specified numbers. The test lasts approximately three minutes."

=== Horizontal Tracking Test (HTT) ===
"Participants use rudder pedals to keep a box over an airplane as it moves horizontally along the bottom of the screen. The airplane moves at a constant speed and changes direction when it “hits” the side of the screen or if a participant successfully targets it for multiple seconds. The task lasts three minutes and the level of difficulty (speed of the airplane) increases as the task progresses."

=== Airplane Tracking Test (ATT) ===
"Participants use the joystick to keep the gun sight on the airplane as it moves at a constant rate. The airplane randomly changes direction when it hits the side of the screen or if a participant successfully targets it for multiple seconds."

=== Airplane and Horizontal Tracking Test ===
"This test requires you to perform two previously tested tasks simultaneously. First, you track an airplane moving along a horizontal axis as you did in the Horizontal Tracking Test. Second, you track an airplane moving in two dimensions as you did in the Airplane Tracking Test."

=== ATT, HTT, and Listening Tests ===
"This test requires you to perform three previously tested tasks simultaneously. First, you will track an airplane moving along a horizontal axis as you did in the Horizontal Tracking Test. Second, you will track an airplane moving in two dimensions as you did in the Airplane Tracking Test. Third, you will respond when you hear any of the three or five specified target numbers."

=== Emergency Scenario Test ===
"Participants simultaneously perform the horizontal tracking task and the airplane tracking task, they are presented with three emergency scenarios (one at a time) which they must cancel out by typing a code with the keyboard."

== Scoring the TBAS ==
The scoring of the test is kept secret, and TBAS scores are never explicitly reported, but as the score is a component of the PCSM score, a general idea of one's performance can be gleaned from the PCSM score.
