= Air Force Officer Training School =

US Air Force and Space Force officer accession program

Officer Training School
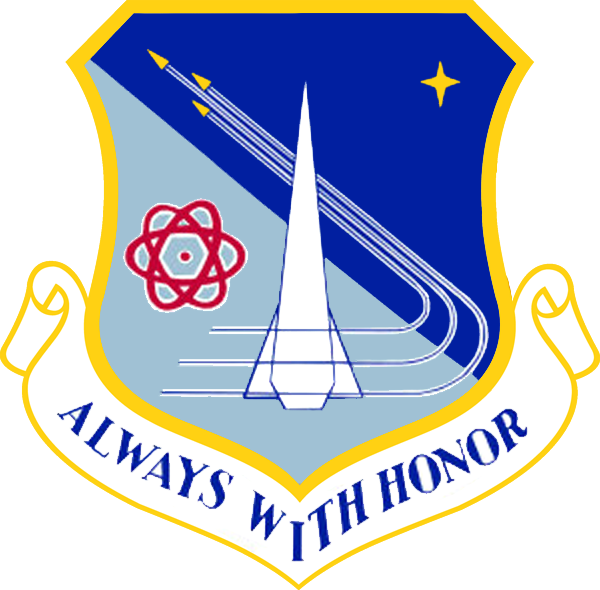
- Officer Training School emblem
- Active: 1959–present
- Country: United States
- Branch: United States Air Force; United States Space Force
- Type: Officer accession training
- Role: Train and commission officers for the Department of the Air Force
- Part of: Air Education and Training Command; Air University
- Garrison/HQ: Maxwell Air Force Base, Alabama
- Motto: "Always with Honor"
- Website: https://www.afaccessionscenter.af.mil/Holm-Center/OTS/

Commanders
- Current commander: Colonel Roxanne T. Toy, USAF

Officer Training School (OTS) is a United States Air Force and United States Space Force officer accession and training program located at Maxwell Air Force Base in Montgomery, Alabama. It is administered by the Jeanne M. Holm Center for Officer Accessions and Citizen Development, a component of Air University responsible for Department of the Air Force officer recruitment, training, and citizenship programs.

OTS is one of the Department of the Air Force's officer accession programs and provides initial officer training for college graduates, prior-enlisted personnel, and selected direct commission officers entering the Air Force, Air Force Reserve, Air National Guard, and Space Force. The school offers three resident courses: the 60 day Officer Training School course, the 32 day Officer Training School-Abbreviated course, and the 15 day Reserve Commissioned Officer Orientation course.

== Overview ==
Officer Training School is a part of the Jeanne M. Holm Center for Officer Accession and Citizen Development, formerly the Air Force Officer Accession and Training Schools (AFOATS). Named for the late Major General Jeanne M. Holm, the Holm Center falls under Air University (AU), which, in turn, falls under the Air Education and Training Command (AETC), an Air Force major command (MAJCOM).

In addition to OTS, the Holm Center also has oversight responsibilities for the Air Force Reserve Officer Training Corps (AFROTC) pre-commissioning program on U.S. colleges and universities, the Air Force Junior Reserve Officer Training Corps (AFJROTC) citizen development program in U.S. high schools, and the entire Civil Air Patrol, both its senior member program as the U.S. Air Force Auxiliary (focused on search and rescue and other emergency services and disaster support), and its aerospace education and citizen development cadet program (similar to the AFJROTC cadet program) via its HQ CAP-USAF activity.

The current Commander of the Holm Center (Holm Ctr/CC) is Brigadier General Houston R. Cantwell, USAF and the current Commandant of OTS (OTS/CMDT) is Colonel Roxanne T. Toy, USAF.

During peacetime, OTS is usually the smallest commissioning source in the USAF, producing fewer officers per year than AFROTC and the United States Air Force Academy (USAFA). However, it possesses the capability to surge when USAF requirements dictate and exceed the combined annual officer production of both USAFA and AFROTC. Given its shorter lead time for officer production (currently 8.5 weeks versus the typically 4-year pre-commissioning process for USAFA and AFROTC cadets), OTS is the commissioning source used to balance out USAF officer manning as deemed necessary by the Air Force.

The number of officers commissioned through OTS fluctuates considerably as their numbers are largely influenced by the number of graduating cadets through the USAF Academy and AFROTC, as well as being the first place the Air Force cuts when they have a surplus of cadets through the other two sources. Given this reality, OTS has often surpassed USAFA officer production during wartime periods such as during the Vietnam War in the 1960s and early 1970s or the Reagan defense buildup of the 1980s. Conversely, OTS can be hard to get into during years of contraction within the national defense establishment in general and the Air Force in particular, such as the mid and late 1970s following the end of the Vietnam War and associated USAF force structure reductions or the post-Cold War era and its associated defense reductions of the early and mid-1990s. During these periods of contractions, OTS produces few officers, making selection for the OTS program particularly difficult and competitive for college graduates, especially those with no prior enlisted service, particularly USAF enlisted service.

== Structure ==
OTS is divided into three programs:

Officer Training School (OTS) (formerly known as Basic Officer Training (BOT) and later, Total Force Officer Training (TFOT)) is the more traditional 8-week pre-commissioning program. Previously a 13-week program later reduced to 10 weeks, the renamed TFOT track transitioned to a 9-week program in 2014 and the legacy system of Officer Trainees (OT) being designated as lower classmen in the early part of the program and upper classmen in the latter part, similar to their USAFA and AFROTC counterparts, was eliminated. This was further reduced to the current 8-week program in 2017 by removing the Total Force Indoctrination Training (TFIT) from the first week of the course in which Military Training Instructors (MTIs) would teach the customs and standards of the Air Force as well as the basics of marching and drill and ceremonies. Officer Trainees were also re-designated as Cadets in 2015, again on par with USAFA and AFROTC and reminiscent of the Aviation Cadet program in operation in USAF and its predecessor incarnations (e.g., USAAS, USAAC, USAAF, etc.) from 1907 until 1965. As of 2019, the class is an 8-week program and students are once again referred to as Officer Trainees. OTS is for four-year university and college graduates without prior military service (commonly known as non-prior service), as well as Active Component enlisted, Air Force Reserve enlisted, Air National Guard enlisted and former enlisted personnel from any of the six U.S. armed services with college degrees at the baccalaureate level or higher who wish to become Air Force officers. OTS serves all Active Component and Reserve Component line officers except judge advocates.

Officer Training School-Abbreviated (OTS-A) (formerly known as Commissioned Officer Training (COT)) is a five-week program primarily focused on terminal-degreed professionals (e.g., medical, lawyers, chaplains, as well as undergraduate degreed nurses) directly accessed into the USAF officer ranks. OTS-A serves all Regular Air Force, Air Force Reserve and Air National Guard non-line officers (except for Reserve and Air National Guard health professionals as noted below) and judge advocates who did not previously serve as line officers in other career fields or who were not commissioned via USAFA or AFROTC.

OTS and OTS-A are conducted as parallel training programs. At the beginning of a new class, OTS and OTS-A students live and train together in integrated flights. After five weeks, the already-commissioned OTS-A students that have successfully completed the course graduate and move on to either follow-on technical training or their initial assignments. The remaining OTS students complete several other graduation requirements over the final three weeks of the course before graduating and receiving their commissions.

Reserve Commissioned Officer Orientation (RCOO) (formerly known as Reserve Commissioned Officer Training (RCOT)) is a two-week orientation program focused on Air Force Reserve and Air National Guard direct commissioned officers in health-related professions, including physicians and clinical nurses.

Interested applicants for OTS typically contact Air Force recruiters specializing in officer (versus enlisted) accessions. Recruiters will screen candidates, provide application details and schedule applicants for the Air Force Officer Qualifying Test (AFOQT). The AFOQT covers numerous test batteries assessing math, verbal, and analytical skills, as well as measuring pilot and navigator/combat systems officer potential for those applicants aspiring to be aeronautically rated officers. AFOQT scores, college GPA, previous enlisted performance evaluations if a current or former enlisted member, and, if applicable, previous pilot skills as either an FAA-certified civilian pilot and/or as a U.S. Army warrant officer / Army Aviator will all figure into the selection process, although the selection process strives to employ a composite or "whole person" approach.

OTS applicants will be given an opportunity to apply for Air Force career fields that correspond with the applicants' expertise and/or desires and will be interviewed by active duty Air Force officers as well as receive a military medical examination for flying or non-flying duty as appropriate. Applicants will then be screened by a centralized, periodic, OTS Selection Board conducted by the Air Force Recruiting Service, a component of the Air Education and Training Command. Applicants will be notified of acceptance or rejection by their recruiter pending release of the board results.

If not already on active duty as enlisted personnel in the armed forces, selectees for OTS will subsequently enlist in the Air Force Reserve via the Delayed Enlistment Program and will be assigned an OTS class date. Non-prior service college graduates will enlist in the rank of Airman 1st Class (E-3) while prior service enlisted personnel will be enlisted in their current or highest prior pay grade. Upon arrival at OTS, all personnel will be advanced to pay grade E-5 (unless prior enlisted already holding a higher pay grade), but will hold the rank of Officer Trainee versus USAF Staff Sergeant.

Selection for OTS is highly competitive, with selection rates varying dependent on the needs of the Air Force. For example, boards conducted circa 2010–2012 had selection rates in the 20% range due to budgetary reductions / force reductions being imposed on the Air Force at that time. However, by 2017, selection rates had increased to the 65% range or greater, reflecting the increased commissioned officer needs of the service.

== Officer Training Course ==
Per Air Force Instruction (AFI) 36-2013, personnel attending Officer Training School's 8-week program must have a baccalaureate level degree or higher in either technical or non-technical fields. Technical fields may include any ABET-accredited engineering degree or other fields in high demand by the Air Force. Non-technical degrees are more common, and therefore applying with a degree in such a field is very competitive. Applicants can apply for aeronautically rated or non-rated Line Officer of the Air Force (LAF) positions. Rated positions are flying related -- Pilot, Combat Systems Officer (previously known as Navigator), Remotely-Piloted Aircraft (RPA) Pilot, or Air Battle Manager. Non-rated positions fall into two categories: non-rated operations, such as missiles, intelligence, space, cyber, or weather, and non-rated support, such as aircraft maintenance, missile maintenance, logistics, civil engineer, security forces, or communications.

The first few weeks of training are geared toward orienting the cadet with Air Force standards. The focus is on physical training, drill and ceremonies, and academics. Cadets will be expected to work with their fellow flight and squadron members to accomplish specific tasks as required by their Flight Commander and the Cadet Wing. They will also attend multiple classes in an academic environment. Later in the program they will attend field training exercises, projects, small arms training, and building team skills by overcoming challenges in a simulated deployment environment.

To graduate, cadets must meet or exceed physical standards, academic standards, and military bearing standards. Military bearing includes the ability to write and verbally brief, lead the flight, and perform duties within the Cadet Wing.

Upon graduation, OTS graduates may receive either Regular or Reserve commissions as second lieutenants in the Regular United States Air Force, the Air Force Reserve, or the Air National Guard, as appropriate to their original source of entry and contract. The new second lieutenants will be appointed in either pay grade O-1, or O-1E if they have prior cumulative active service as a warrant officer or as an enlisted servicemember in any branch or component of the U.S. armed forces for at least 4 years and 1 day. If any portion of their prior service was in a reserve component and not served in an active duty status, then inactive duty reserve retirement points may be used to qualify for O-1E. If the combination of creditable active duty days and inactive duty points equals 1,460 (equivalent to exactly 4 years and 1 day of cumulative qualifying active and inactive duty), the pay grade O-1E is assigned, which is a significantly higher starting basic pay level than O-1, and remains higher until promoted to O-4.

=== Curriculum ===
The academic curriculum and coursework are derived from five Program Learning Outcomes: Leader of Character, Warfighter, Effective Communicator, Strategic-Minded Officer, and Disciplined Professional. These outcomes are intended to develop ethical leadership, understanding of Department of the Air Force doctrine and the nature of war, professional communication, strategic awareness, and adherence to Department of the Air Force standards.

The course includes a pre-course assignment followed by an in-residence academic curriculum organized into five modules. Module 1 introduces officer trainees to military customs and courtesies, dress and appearance standards, Department of the Air Force core values, the oath of office, the U.S. Constitution, resiliency, and military professionalism. Module 2 emphasizes leadership and communication skills, including self-awareness, full-range leadership, followership, team building, problem solving, critical and creative thinking, conflict management, counseling, organizational climate, evaluation systems, performance statements, and peer feedback.

Module 3 focuses on military and operational foundations, including civilian control of the military, national security, the nature of war, Department of the Air Force contributions to joint operations, military planning, force generation, Agile Combat Employment, military justice, lethality, military-style briefings, and global security issues. Module 4 covers more advanced strategic and operational topics, including air and space capabilities, force packaging, space operations, nuclear operations, international relations, terrorism, strategic competition with China, Russia as a global threat, the law of war, and global hot spots briefings. Module 5 prepares trainees for transition to commissioned service through instruction on Wingman and Guardian intervention, social media and disinformation, career progression, first assignment expectations, and final peer and instructor feedback.

== Officer Training School-Abbreviated ==
OTS-A is a 5-week course for professionals who have received a direct commission. Typically, these officers have advanced, graduate-level degrees, often masters or doctorates. Professions include chaplains, physicians (MD or DO), physician assistants, podiatrists, optometrists, dentists, pharmacists, clinical and counseling psychologists, nurses, social workers, lawyers, and veterinarians. They often enter at an advanced rank, such as first lieutenant (O-2) and sometimes as captain (O-3) in compensation for their higher levels of education, and in some cases, experience. Officers can be commissioned up to the rank of colonel (O-6) if they possess the level of experience necessary.

With the exception of those officers previously commissioned as line officers through USAFA, AFROTC, the 8-week program of OTS, or the Air Force Nurse program of AFROTC, most chaplains, judge advocates general (i.e., lawyers), and medical personnel go through OTS-A.

Medical students and related medical professions students that have received a Health Professions Scholarship Program scholarship or those attending the Uniformed Services University of the Health Sciences undergo OTS-A, and are commissioned as second lieutenants (O1) during their professional training.

OTS-A is responsible for developing medical, legal, and chaplain personnel into professional officers by instilling character, knowledge, and motivation essential to serve in the United States Air Force. The 23rd Training Squadron (23 TRS) provides a 23-training day Commissioned Officer Training course to instill leadership and officership skills in newly commissioned medical officers, judge advocates, and chaplains. The 23 TRS also conducts a 13-training day Reserve Commissioned Officer Orientation (RCOO) program for hard-to-recruit medical officers in the Air Force Reserve and Air National Guard.

== The History of OTS ==
The film Wings Up (1943) helped promote the USAAF OCS

When the Aviation Cadet (AvCad) Program proved insufficient to meet wartime commissioned officer requirements, the United States Army Air Forces established the Officer Candidate School (OCS) on 23 February 1942 at Miami Beach, Florida, its mission being to train and commission members from the enlisted ranks.

OCS moved to the San Antonio Aviation Cadet Center (now Lackland AFB), Texas, in 1944 and gained the additional mission of training officers directly from civilian status in September 1951.

OTS was organized at Lackland AFB, Texas, in November 1959, with the first OTS class (60-A) composed of 89 officer trainees, including 11 women, who graduated and were commissioned as 2nd Lieutenants on 9 February 1960. The number of OTS graduates has varied over the years, from 323 the first year to a high of 7,894 officers in 1967.

With the establishment of OTS, Air Force OCS closed its doors and conducted its last graduation in June 1963. Concurrently, the Air Force also commenced a phaseout of its long-standing Aviation Cadet (AvCad) Program at Lackland AFB. Unlike OTS, AvCad was limited to pilot and navigator candidates. In addition, AvCads had to successfully complete either undergraduate pilot training or undergraduate navigator training before they could be commissioned as Second Lieutenants. The last AvCad pilot was commissioned in October 1961 at the former Reese AFB, Texas, and the last AvCad navigator was commissioned in March 1965, at the former James Connally AFB, Texas. OTS then became the sole organization for training future Air Force officers at Lackland AFB.

On 1 July 1993, Air Training Command (ATC) merged with Air University (AU) to form the new Air Education and Training Command (AETC), with Air University becoming a direct reporting unit (DRU) under AETC. OTS, which was formerly under ATC, and Air Force ROTC, which was formerly under AU, were then realigned under both AETC and AU.

Until 22 September 1993, Officer Training School was primarily located on the Medina Annex of Lackland AFB, Texas, with the last OTS class, Class 93-06, graduating from that location on that date. For a short period during the build up of the Air Force to meet the demands of the Vietnam War, as many as three OTS Squadrons were based directly at Lackland AFB. During the spring and summer of 1993, OTS gradually relocated to Maxwell AFB, Alabama, the home of Air University, commencing operations in interim facilities on 25 September 1993.

Historically, the USAF Academy had been (and continues to be) headed by a lieutenant general and Air Force ROTC had been headed by a major general or brigadier general, while OTS had been headed by a colonel. In February 1997, in an effort to reduce duplication of effort and streamline administrative and reporting procedures within AU, AFROTC and OTS realigned under a newly created umbrella organization, Air Force Officer Accession and Training Schools (AFOATS). Under this restructuring, OTS and AFROTC were placed under the leadership of individual USAF colonels (AFJROTC and CAP were also placed under individual USAF colonels), while general officer oversight for both OTS and AFROTC, representing three-quarters of Air Force officer production, was placed under one command, the AFOATS commander, a brigadier general.

In the late 1990s, a $52 million military construction (MILCON) project commenced to build a new, dedicated OTS campus at Maxwell AFB to replace the interim facilities initially occupied in late 1993. The majority of this MILCON project was completed in 2001 and all projects relating to the Maxwell AFB OTS campus were completed by 2004. AFROTC, which had previously conducted its summer Field Training (FT) program for their cadets between their sophomore and junior academic years at various air force bases around the United States, also consolidated its summer FT program at the OTS facilities at Maxwell AFB circa 2008.

As part of another organizational restructuring of AU, AFOATS was later renamed the Jeanne M. Holm Center for Officer Accession and Citizen Development, while still retaining oversight of OTS, Air Force ROTC, Air Force Junior ROTC, and the Civil Air Patrol.

== See also ==
- Officer Candidate School
