= Professional military education in the United States Air Force =

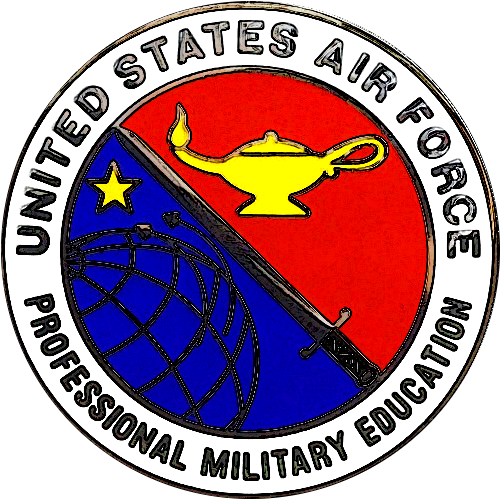

The United States Air Force provides a continuum of professional military education at Air University with Basic Developmental Education (BDE), Primary Developmental Education (PDE), Intermediate Developmental Education (IDE), and Senior Developmental Education (SDE). In the Air Force, Primary is Squadron Officer School (SOS), Intermediate is Air Command and Staff College (ACSC), and Senior is Air War College (AWC). Basic was the Air and Space Basic Course (ASBC), but it is inactive as of July 2011.

Typically Captains take SOS, Majors attend ACSC, and Lt Colonels or Colonels take Air War College. All officers are expected to complete their appropriate PME commensurate with their rank either by correspondence, or, if selected, in residence at Maxwell Air Force Base. Both in-residence Air Command and Staff College and Air War College are regionally accredited Masters programs (M.A.) and take slightly less than 1 year to complete.
