= Camm =

Camm or CAMM may refer to:

== People ==
- Amanda Camm (born 1979), Australian politician
- David Camm (born 1964), former Indiana State Police acquitted of the murders of his wife and children
- Frank A. Camm (1922–2012), Lieutenant General, US Army
- Frederick James Camm (1895–1959), British technical author and magazine editor
- John Camm (Anglican priest) (1718–1778), president of the College of William & Mary, US
- Ron Camm (1914–1988), Australian politician
- Sydney Camm (1893–1966), British aviator
- T. W. Camm (1839–1912), English stained glass designer and manufacturer

== Other uses ==
- Camm, Virginia, an unincorporated community, US
- CAMM (missile family) (Common Anti-Air Modular Missile), by MBDA UK
- Council of American Maritime Museums, for North American maritime museums
- CAMM (memory module), of a computer
