= Air and Space Basic Course =

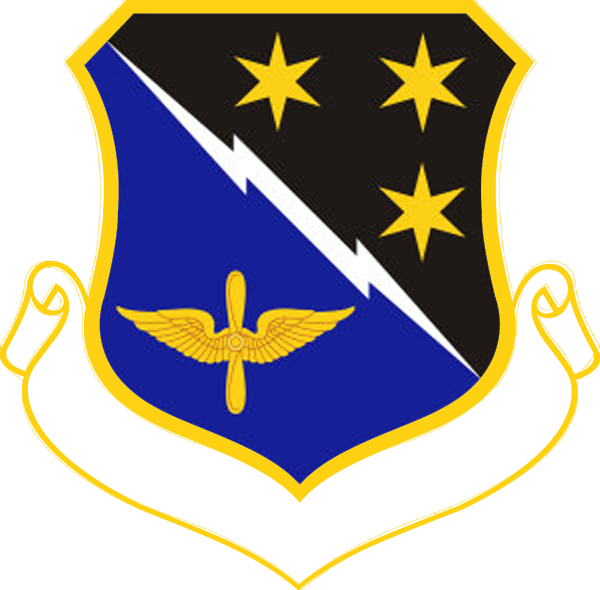
- Air and Space Basic Course emblem
- Active: 12 September 1997 to 22 July 2011
- Country: United States of America
- Branch: Air Force
- Type: Professional Military Education
- Size: 2,700 students annually
- Part of: Squadron Officer College, Air University, Air Education and Training Command
- base: Maxwell AFB, AL
- Colors: blue, black, and gold
- Decorations: Air Force Organizational Excellence Award (7)
- Website: www.au.af.mil/au/soc/asbc.html

Air and Space Basic Course (ASBC), initially and briefly known as Aerospace Basic Course (ABC), was a Professional Military Education (PME) course taught by the Squadron Officer College, Air University, at Maxwell AFB, AL. From 1997 to mid-2011, it was the first level of PME for U.S. Air Force second lieutenants and was required regardless of commissioning source. Together, ASBC and Squadron Officer School comprised the Air Force's Basic Developmental Education (BDE) program. Each ASBC class had approximately 12 students and was taught by an Air Force Captain.

In addition to newly commissioned Air Force officers, Department of Defense (DoD) civilians in pay grade GS-7 or NSPS Pay Band 2 or above who had completed a baccalaureate degree were also eligible to attend. Air Force guidance was for 100 percent of line, active-duty Air Force officers to attend ASBC, to include direct entry Air Force Reserve and Air National Guard officers who were on active duty for initial officer accession training and follow-on flight training or other technical training. Typical classes included representatives from all major commands and job specialties in the Air Force, and included Air Force Reserve and Air National Guard members as well as DoD civilians, primarily junior Department of the Air Force Civilians (DAFC).

== History ==
ASBC was activated on 12 September 1997 as part of the Air Education and Training Command. On 8 February 2000 it joined with the Squadron Officer School to form the Squadron Officer College. During its period of activation, the program was awarded the Organizational Excellence Award seven times.

ASBC closed after the final group of lieutenants graduates from the course in the summer of 2011. The course was then remerged to become part of the curriculum in the Squadron Officer School. The new eight-week SOS course opened in early 2012.

== Curriculum ==
ASBC was a six-week in-resident course, with approximately ten start dates a year. One week of the course ran concurrently with a combined program at the Senior NCO Academy at Maxwell-Gunter Annex.

The aegis for ASBC was The Basic School (TBS), the 6-month initial school for all newly commissioned U.S. Marine Corps officers regardless of commissioning source. ASBC was dedicated to inculcate "a warrior ethos in the Air Force’s youngest officers through a rigorous experiential and academic program aimed at imparting critical warfighting skills while simultaneously introducing students to the full range of Air Force operations, organizational constructs, and doctrinal concepts." A component of the airpower doctrine instruction takes place through classroom "wargames" that simulate theater-level combat operations. Prior to its disestablishment, the course has added a "combatives" element that applied the classroom instruction to the expeditionary combat culture of the modern Air Force.

The disestablishment of ASBC was not due to any perceived shortcomings with the curriculum. Rather, given severe financial pressures on the service, it was determined that elimination of ASBC would save over $12 million annually ($13.4 million in 2018 dollars) in temporary duty travel and per diem costs for sending newly commissioned second lieutenants to Maxwell AFB while en route to their follow-on duty stations.

== See also ==
- Air and Space Basic Course official website
