= Mark Toy =

U.S. Army general

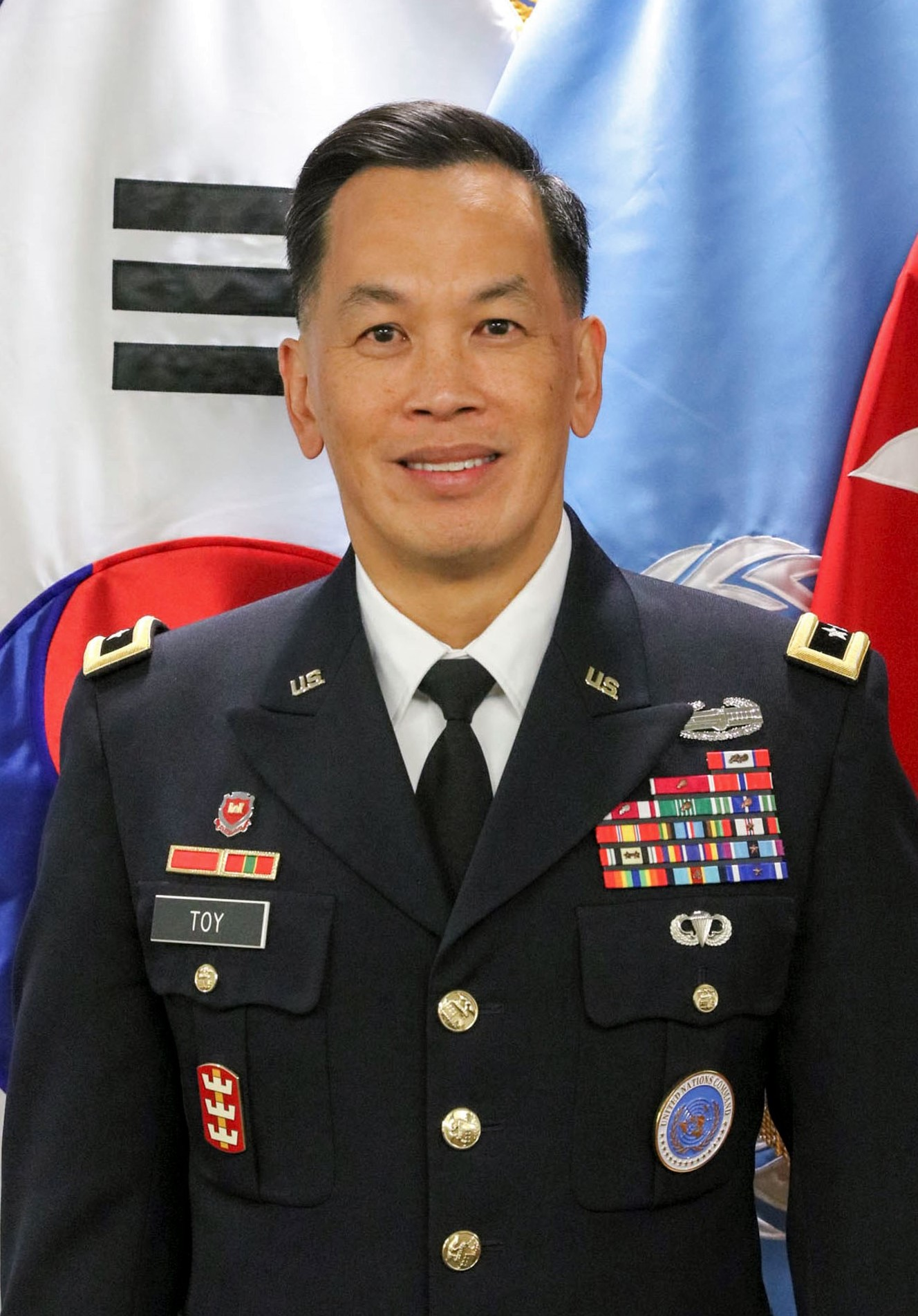
- Official portrait, 2020
- Military career
- Allegiance: United States
- Branch: United States Army
- Service years: 1987–2022
- Rank: Major General
- Commands: Mississippi Valley Division; Great Lakes and Ohio River Division; South Pacific Division; 84th Engineer Battalion
- Conflicts: War in Afghanistan; Iraq War
- Awards: Army Distinguished Service Medal (3); Legion of Merit (2); Bronze Star Medal

Richard Mark Toy is a retired United States Army major general who served as the Chief of Staff of the United Nations Command from August 10, 2020, to June 2022. He previously served as the Commanding General of the Mississippi Valley Division from August 16, 2019, to June 30, 2020.

Military offices
Preceded by C. David Turner	Commanding General of the South Pacific Division; 2014–2016	Succeeded by D. Peter Helmlinger
Preceded by Richard G. Kaiser	Commanding General of the Great Lakes and Ohio River Division; 2016–2019	Succeeded by Robert F. Whittle Jr.
Preceded by Richard G. Kaiser	Commanding General of the Mississippi Valley Division; 2019–2020	Succeeded by Diana M. Holland
Preceded by Mark W. Gillette	Chief of Staff of the United Nations Command; 2020–2022	Succeeded by Brad M. Sullivan
