= William G. Holt =

U.S. Air Force general

William G. Holt II
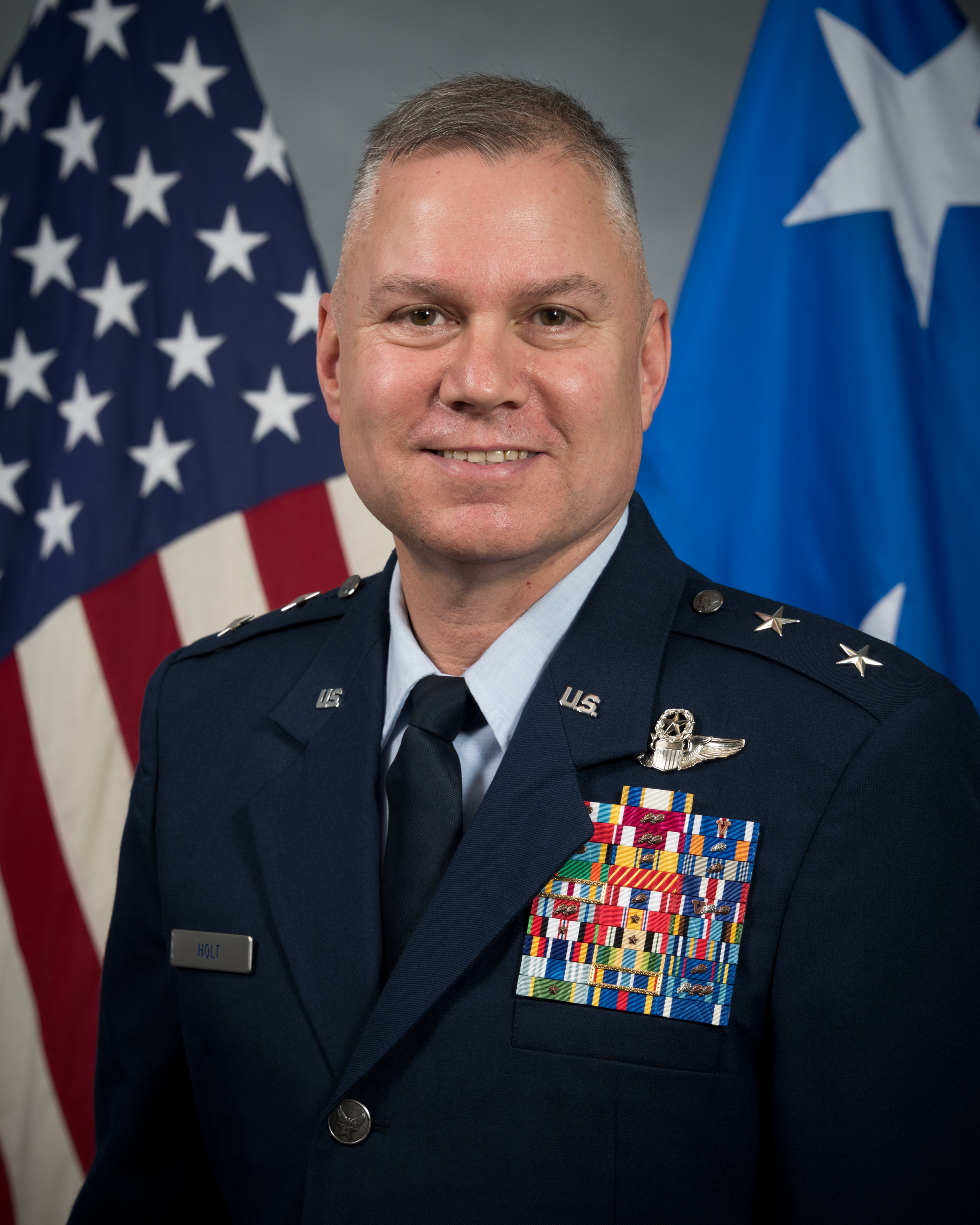
- Military career
- Allegiance: United States
- Branch: United States Air Force
- Service years: 1991–2023
- Rank: Major General
- Commands: 352nd Special Operations Wing; 1st Expeditionary Special Operations Wing; 319th Special Operations Squadron
- Awards: Air Force Distinguished Service Medal; Defense Superior Service Medal; Legion of Merit (3)

William G. Holt II is a retired United States Air Force major general who last served as the vice commander of the Air University from 2021 to 2023. He most recently served as the director for operations, training, and force development of the United States Space Command. Previously, he was the director of the joint space operations development for the same combatant command. He also served as the special assistant to the commander of the Air Force Special Operations Command. In February 2021, he was assigned to replace Major General Brad M. Sullivan as vice commander of the Air University.

Military offices
Preceded by Scott A. Howell	Director of Operations of the Air Force Special Operations Command; 2016–2018	Succeeded by Brenda Cartier
Preceded by Vincent Becklund	Special Assistant to the Commander of the Air Force Special Operations Command; 2018–2019	Succeeded by ???
New office	Director of Joint Space Operations Development of the United States Space Command; 2019–2020	Directorate merged
Preceded by Thomas L. James	Director of Operations, Training, and Force Development of the United States Space Command; 2020–2021	Succeeded by David N. Miller
Preceded by Brad M. Sullivan	Vice Commander of the Air University; 2021–2023	Succeeded by Parker H. Wright
