= Frank A. Camm =

United States Army officer

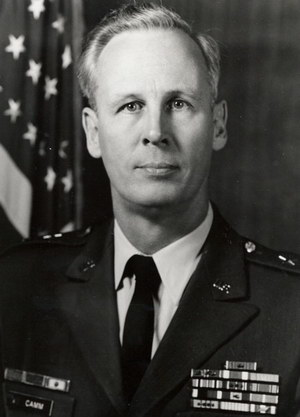
- Born: 13 March 1922; Camp Knox, Kentucky, U.S.
- Died: 17 January 2012 (aged 89); Fort Belvoir, Virginia, U.S.
- Spouse: Arlene Brinkman
- Children: 1d, 1s
- Relatives: William Beall (great grandfather)
- Military career
- Allegiance: United States
- Branch: United States Army
- Service years: 1943–1977
- Rank: Lieutenant General
- Service number: O-25448
- Unit: Corps of Engineers
- Commands: South Pacific Division; 521st Engineer Group; Okinawa Engineer District; 2nd Engineer Combat Battalion; 144th Special Weapons Unit; 303rd Engineer Combat Battalion
- Conflicts: World War II; Battle of Hürtgen Forest; Roer Crossing; Battle of Remagen; Ruhr pocket; Allied occupation of Germany; Korean War; Vietnam War
- Awards: Army Distinguished Service Medal; Legion of Merit (3); Bronze Star Medal (3)

Frank Ambler Camm (13 March 1922 – 17 January 2012) was a United States Army officer who served in World War II, the Korean War and the Vietnam War.

A graduate of the United States Military Academy at West Point, New York class of January 1943, he served in Europe during World War II with the 303rd Engineer Combat Battalion, which he commanded in the Allied occupation of West Berlin. After the war he joined the Manhattan Engineer District, and commanded an atomic bomb assembly team at Sandia Base, in New Mexico. He commanded the 2nd Engineer Combat Battalion in the closing stages of the Korean War, and served in the Vietnam War on the staff of the Military Assistance Command, Vietnam, directing the McNamara Line project. He was the Director of Military Applications at the United States Atomic Energy Commission as from 1970 to 1972, the Assistant Deputy Chief of Staff of the Army for Operations from 1974 to 1975, and the deputy commander of Training and Doctrine Command from 1976 to 1977.

== Early life ==
Frank Amber Camm was born in Fort Knox, Kentucky, on 13 March 1922, the son of Frank Camm, an Army officer, and his wife Felicia née Taylor. He had a twin brother, a younger brother, and a sister. The family moved about frequently, and he grew up in Fort Bragg, North Carolina, the Territory of Hawaii, and the family farm, St Moor, in Amherst, Virginia.

== World War II ==
On 1 July 1939, Camm entered the United States Military Academy (USMA) at West Point, New York. He was not the first member of his family to attend West Point; his great grandfather William Beall had graduated with the class of 1848. At West Point he lettered in high jump. Due to the outbreak of World War II, his class graduated early on 19 January 1943, and he was commissioned as a second lieutenant in the Corps of Engineers, ranked 16th in his class. After an abbreviated engineer training course at Fort Belvoir, Virginia, he joined the 303rd Engineer Combat Battalion at Camp Butner, North Carolina. His battalion was part of the 78th Infantry Division, in which his father, now a brigadier general, commanded the divisional artillery. His father once found some of his guns stopped in front of a flimsy-looking truss bridge. When he was informed “That tall, skinny engineer lieutenant says the bridge is safe”, he replied, “I know that engineer. Drive across!” The bridge did not collapse.

Camm was promoted to first lieutenant on 19 May 1943, and captain on 31 July 1944. On 5 March 1944, he had assumed command of C Company of the 303rd Engineer Combat Battalion. The 78th Infantry Division departed the New York Port of Embarkation on 14 October 1944, and landed in France on 22 November 1944. Camm participated in the final stages of the Battle of Hürtgen Forest, and the crossed the flooded Roer River on 3 February 1945. After the capture of the Rhine bridge at Remagen, his company was the first complete company of engineers to cross the Rhine River. In the battles in the Ruhr pocket, he helped conduct three assault crossings of the Sieg River. Although only 23 years old, Camm commanded the 303rd Engineer Combat Battalion from 25 August 45 to 16 May 1945, participating in the Allied occupation of West Berlin. He was promoted to major in the Army of the United States (AUS) on 27 August 1945, but reverted to his substantive rank of first lieutenant in the Corps of Engineers on 19 January 1946. For his services with the 303rd Engineer Combat Battalion, he was awarded three Bronze Star Medals.

== Post-war ==
On 11 September 1945, Camm was assigned to the Manhattan Engineer District (MED), which was responsible for nuclear weapons. To replace the reservists who had served in the MED during the war but now were eligible for separation from the Army, the director of the Manhattan Project, Major General Leslie Groves secured the services of fifty West Point graduates from the top ten percent of their classes to man nuclear bomb-assembly teams at Sandia Base in New Mexico. At Sandia, Camm commanded H and S Company of the 2761st Engineer Battalion (Special). He was assigned to B Company, the bomb assembly company, on 15 April 1947. With the formation of the Armed Forces Special Weapons Project, the battalion was redesignated the 38th Engineer Battalion (Special) in April 1947, and Camm assumed command of B Company on 15 April. While he was at Sandia, he met Arlene Brinkman, and they were married in Albuquerque, New Mexico. They had two children: a daughter, Arlene, and a son, Frank Amber Camm Jr. Camm participated in the 1948 Operation Sandstone nuclear test series at Enewetak Atoll. On returning to Sandia in June 1948, he assumed command of C Company, with the rank of captain from 1 July. in December, the 38th Engineer Battalion (Special) became the 8460th Special Weapons Group, and Camm became the commander of the 144th Special Weapons Unit.

Camm earned a master's degree in engineering from Harvard University in 1951, topping his class, followed by further military engineering studies at Fort Belvoir. In 1953 he assumed command of the 2nd Engineer Combat Battalion in Korea, where it was engaged in the final stages of the Korean War as part of the 2nd Infantry Division. The following year he became chief engineer of the Okinawa Engineer District. He returned to the United States in 1956 as a student at the United States Army Command and General Staff College at Fort Leavenworth, and attended the National War College from 1960-1961. He commanded the 521st Engineer Group in Germany in 1962-1963, and then served in the Office of the Secretary of Defense in Washington, D.C., for which he was awarded the Legion of Merit. He earned a second master's degree from George Washington University in 1965, this time in international relations, and attended the Harvard Business School Advanced Management Program in 1966. In 1967, Camm served a tour of duty in the Vietnam War on the headquarters of the Military Assistance Command, Vietnam, during which he was the director of the McNamara Line project, which aimed to create a barrier of electronic sensors along the Vietnamese Demilitarized Zone. For this he was awarded an oak leaf cluster to his Legion of Merit.

On returning to the United States, he served on the Army staff, where he was involved in tactical nuclear war planning. From 1970 to 1972, he was the chief engineer of the Corps of Engineers South Pacific Division. In this role he was involved with the Army's response to the environmental movement, and he was awarded a second oak leaf cluster to his Legion of Merit. He was then seconded to the United States Atomic Energy Commission as its Director of Military Applications from 1970 to 1972. As such, he oversaw the work of the nuclear weapons laboratories Los Alamos, Sandia, and Livermore, the Nevada Test Site, and nine nuclear weapon production plants. He was Assistant Deputy Chief of Staff for Operations from 1974 to 1975. His final assignment was as the deputy commander of Training and Doctrine Command from 1976 to 1977, supervising 26 Army schools and training centers and Army Reserve Officer Training Corps (ROTC), where he fostered the use of laser beams for simulating combat. For his services he received the Army Distinguished Service Medal. He retired from the Army in 1977 with the rank of lieutenant general.

== Later life ==
In 1977 Camm moved to the Central Intelligence Agency (CIA) as the Deputy Director of Intelligence for Collection of national human, signal, and photo intelligence. In 1979 he was appointed to the Federal Emergency Management Agency (FEMA) as the associate director in charge of civil defense. He retired in 1981.

Camm became president of the West Point Society of D.C., and in this role he was involved in the construction of the Herbert Hall alumni center at West Point. He also served as president of the Army Retirement Residence Foundation - Potomac, a nonprofit organization of retired Army officers that worked to build an upscale retirement community for Army officers in Fairfax County, Virginia. He negotiated the purchase of the land for the project from the General Services Administration and a Native American corporation from Alaska that had purchased property in the area in 1986, and worked with the Marriott Corporation to construct the community, which opened in 1989. Camm moved there in 2007. He received the District of Columbia West Point Society's Castle Memorial Award in 1999 and the West Point Distinguished Graduate Award in 2005.

Camm died from cancer at Fort Belvoir on 17 January 2012, and was buried in Arlington National Cemetery.

He is survived by a similarly named son who rose to be a senior economist at the RAND Corporation, conducting numerous high profile studies related to defense issues and the military industrial complex on behalf of the Pentagon.
