= Troup Miller Jr. =

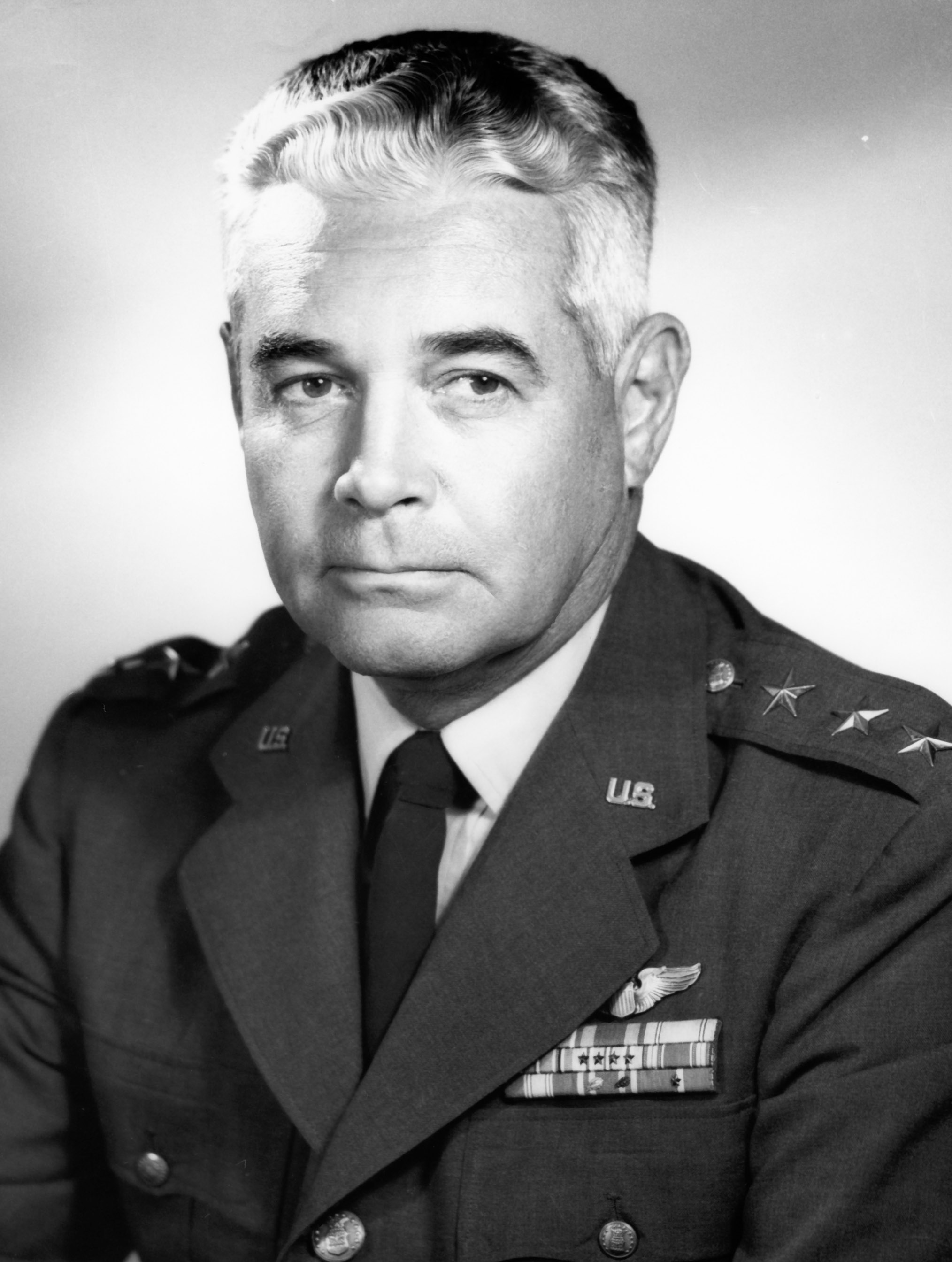
- Born: 30 August 1908; Omaha, Nebraska, U.S.
- Died: 14 May 1988 (aged 79); Atlanta, Georgia, U. S.
- Burial place: Arlington National Cemetery, Arlington, Virginia, U.S.
- Military career
- Allegiance: United States
- Branch: United States Army (1930–1947); United States Air Force (1947–1964)
- Service years: 1930–1964
- Rank: Lieutenant general
- Commands: 59th Air Service Group; XIII Bomber Command
- Conflicts: World War II; New Guinea campaign; Philippines campaign (1944–1945); Borneo campaign (1945); China offensive campaign
- Awards: Legion of Merit; Air Medal

Troup Miller Jr. (30 August 1908 – 14 May 1988) was a United States Air Force (USAF) lieutenant general who played an important role in the founding of the Air University, and was its commander from 1961 to 1963. A 1930 graduate of the United States Military Academy (USMA) in West Point, New York, Miller received his pilot rating on 7 October 1931. During World War II he was deputy chief of staff of the Fifth Air Force and the Far East Air Forces, and commanded the XIII Bomber Command.

== Early life ==
Troup Miller Jr. was born in Omaha, Nebraska, on 30 August 1908, the son of Troup Miller, a United States Army officer stationed at Fort Omaha, and his wife Rosa née Coffin. When he was two years old, his father was posted to Fort William McKinley in the Philippines, where he became enamoured with flight. First Lieutenant Frank P. Lahm, one of the US Army's first aviators, who had been taught to fly by Wilbur Wright, would take him down to the polo field where he watched Lahm fly his Curtiss Pusher.

Because his father was moved about frequently, Miller attended several elementary schools. He graduated from Western High School in Washington, DC, when he was sixteen years old. He intended to go to the United States Military Academy (USMA) in West Point, New York, from which his father had graduated in 1902, but was too young. He therefore spent a year at Saint Luke's School in Wayne, Pennsylvania. He secured an alternative senatorial appointment to the USMA from the Georgia, which he considered his home state. The principal nominee failed, and he entered West Point on 1 July 1926.

== Between the wars ==
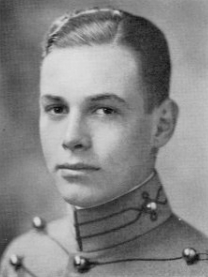
As a West Point cadet

Miller graduated from West Point on 12 June 1930, ranked 126th in his class, and was commissioned as a second lieutenant in the cavalry, but was immediately seconded to the Air Corps for flight training. After the usual post-graduation furlough, he reported to March Field, California, for flight training on 15 October 1930. He then underwent advanced flight training at Kelly Field, Texas, and received his pilot rating on 7 October 1931. He was assigned to the 49th Bombardment Squadron at Langley Field, Virginia, on 15 October, where he was formally transferred to the Air Corps on 22 December.

In May 1932, Miller married Julia Lowry Meadow, whom he had met while at Saint Luke's. They had three daughters: Julia (Judy), Marilyn, and Katherine (Taffy). Between 6 February and 28 May 1934, Miller flew air mail between Mitchel Field, New York, and Atlanta, Georgia. He was then assigned to the 20th Bombardment Squadron. He was promoted to the temporary rank of first lieutenant on 20 April 1935, with his rank becoming substantive on 1 August 1935. He became a flight instructor at Kelly Field on 1 July 1936, where he was promoted to captain on 12 June 1940.

== World War II ==
Miller assumed command of a training group at the Air Corps Advanced Flying School at Maxwell Field, Alabama in November 1940. He was project officer at the Air Corps Replacement Training Center there from March to May 1941, and then project officer at the Air Corps Advanced Flying School at Valdosta, Georgia until October 1941, when he assumed command of the Air Corps Replacement Training Center at Maxwell Field. He was promoted to major on 15 July 1941, and lieutenant colonel on 5 January 1942. In March 1942 he became assistant project officer at the Army Air Force Combat Crew School in Smyrna, Tennessee, and the director of training there in June 1942. He then returned to Maxwell Field as the assistant commandant of the Army Air Force Pilot School (Four-Engine). He was promoted to colonel on 5 January 1943.

From October 1943 to February 1944, Miller attended the Army-Navy Staff College in Washington, DC. The following month, he went to the Southwest Pacific Area. He briefly served in the Transportation Section of General Douglas MacArthur's General Headquarters in Brisbane before becoming the deputy chief of staff of the Fifth Air Force. As such, he was involved in the planning for the Battle of Hollandia. When the Far East Air Forces was formed in July 1944, he became its deputy chief of staff. He commanded the 59th Air Service Group on Leyte from January to May 1945. He then became chief of staff of the XIII Bomber Command, which he commanded from July to September 1945. based on Morotai, it conducted air strikes in support of the Borneo campaign and the China offensive campaign. He then reverted to being its chief of staff. For his services in the Southwest Pacific Area, he was awarded the Legion of Merit and the Air Medal.

== Post war career ==
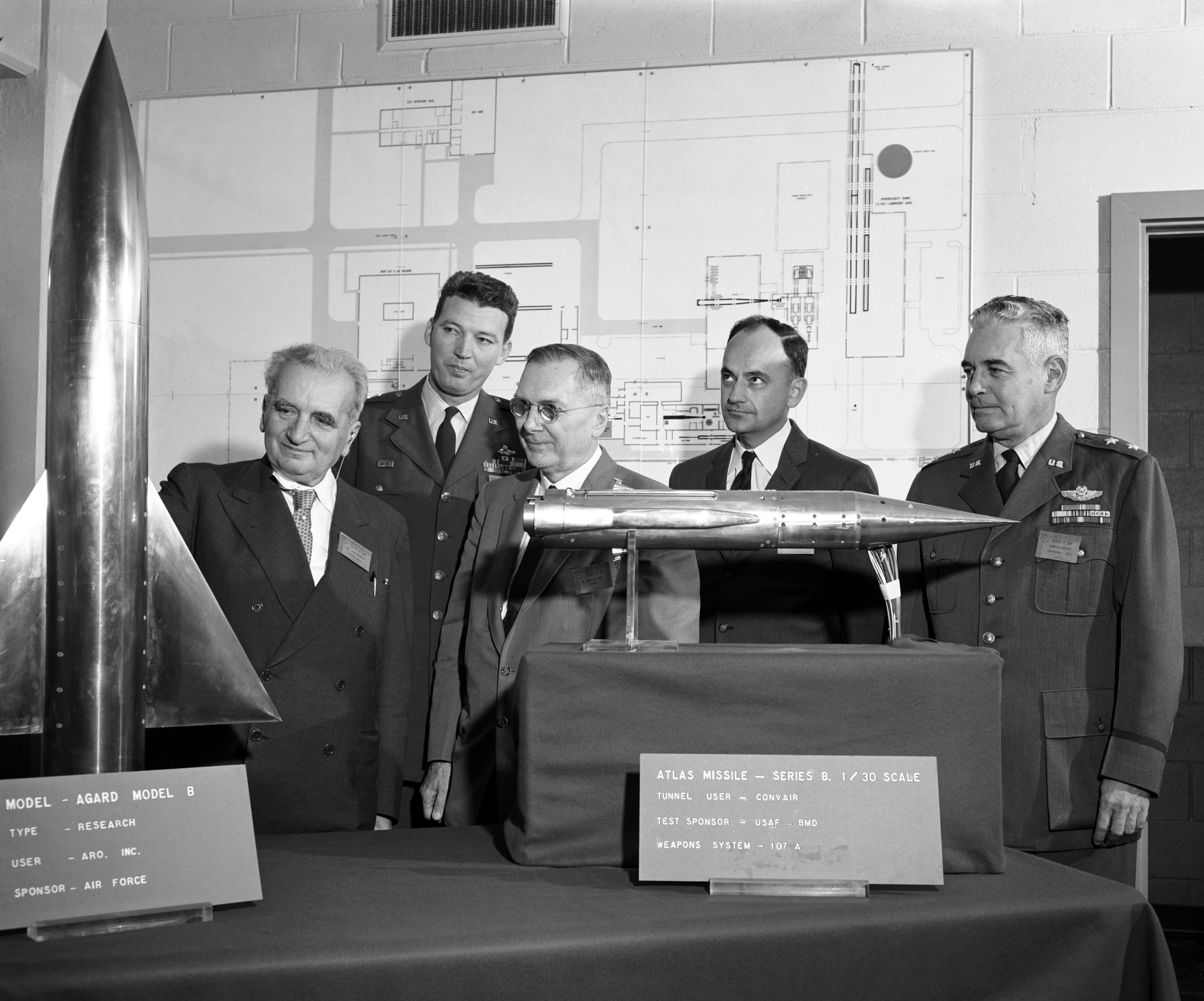
Miller (right) shows (left to right) Theodore von Kármán, Bernard Schriever, Hugh Dryden and Joseph V. Charyk models used in the wind tunnels at the Arnold Engineering Development Center on 30 October 1959

After the war ended, Miller was involved with the founding of the Air University at Maxwell Field as its assistant chief of staff for operations, and then, in March 1946, as the chief of the plans division of the academic staff. His substantive rank was major from 12 June 1947, but he became a colonel in the United States Air Force on 2 April 1948. From August 1948 to June 1949 he was a student at the USAF Air War College there. He then went to Washington, DC, where he worked in the office of the deputy chief of staff for materiel at United States Air Force headquarters.

Miller was promoted to brigadier general in 1951. In June 1953 he went to the United Kingdom as commander of Northern Air Material Area (Europe), with its headquarters in Burtonwood, England. He was promoted to major general in 1956. The commander of the Air Research and Development Command, General Thomas S. Power selected Miller to command the Arnold Engineering Development Center (AEDC) in Tullahoma, Tennessee. This was an unusual appointment in that Miller had no engineering background, but what was required at the time was someone to streamline the organization.

In 1960, Miller became the deputy commander of the Air University at what was now Maxwell Air Force Base. On 1 August 1961, he became its commander, with the rank of lieutenant general. In this role he improved instructional techniques, expanded the curricula, introduced tuition assistance for Air Force ROTC students, expanded the reach of the Air University by establishing associate degree courses at other Air Force bases, and instituted a degree completion program in cooperation with George Washington University. His tenure ended on 31 December 1963, and he officially retired from the USAF on 1 January 1964.

== Death ==
Miller was diagnosed with lung cancer in 1987, although he had given up smoking forty years before. He died on 14 May 1988, and was buried in Arlington National Cemetery.
