= Mark Gillette =

U.S. Army general

Mark W. Gillette
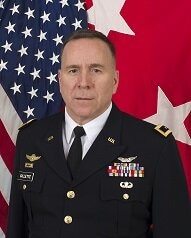
- Official portrait, 2018
- Military career
- Allegiance: United States
- Branch: United States Army
- Service years: 1983–2023
- Rank: Major General
- Awards: Defense Superior Service Medal (4)

Mark W. Gillette is United States Army major general who served as the Senior Defense Official and Defense Attaché to U.S. Embassy Cairo, Egypt from September 2020 to January 2023. Previously he served as the Chief of Staff of the United Nations Command from August 2018 to September 2020 and Defense Attaché to U.S. Embassy Beijing, China from June 2013 to June 2015.

Military offices
Preceded by David R. Stilwell	Senior Defense Official and Defense Attaché to the United States Embassy in China; 2013–2015	Succeeded by Adrian J. Jansen
Preceded by ???	Deputy Director for Strategic Planning and Policy of the United States Pacific Command; 2015–2018	Succeeded by Stephen L. Michael
Preceded by Michael Minihan	Chief of Staff of the United Nations Command; 2018–2020	Succeeded by R. Mark Toy
Preceded by Robin Fontes	Senior Defense Official and Defense Attaché to the United States Embassy in Egypt; 2020–2023	Succeeded by N/A
