= Brad M. Sullivan =

U.S. Air Force general

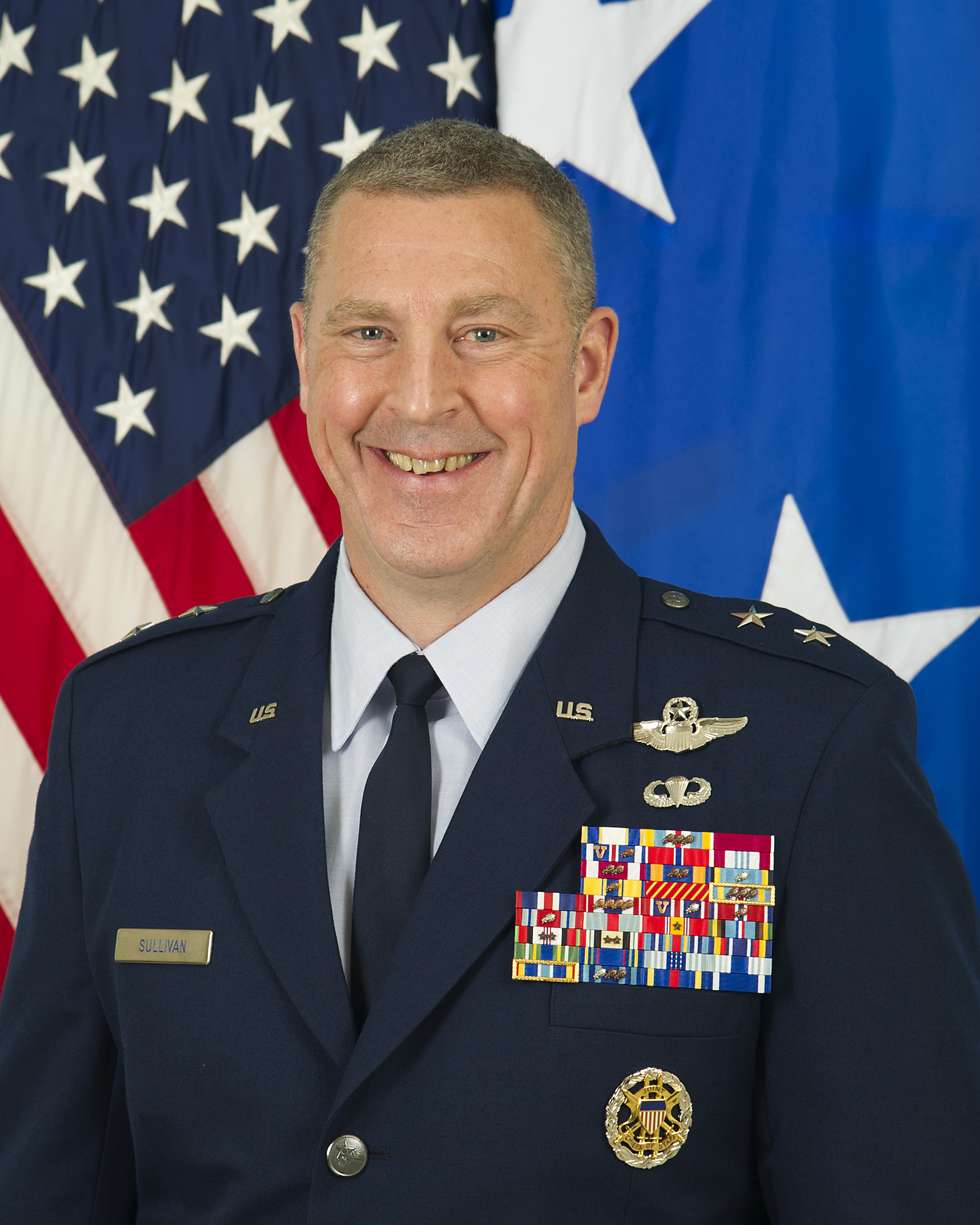
- Military career
- Allegiance: United States
- Branch: United States Air Force
- Service years: 1990–2023
- Rank: Major General
- Commands: 1st Expeditionary Special Operations Wing; 353rd Special Operations Group; 7th Special Operations Squadron
- Conflicts: War in Afghanistan; Iraq War
- Awards: Air Force Distinguished Service Medal; Defense Superior Service Medal (4); Legion of Merit; Distinguished Flying Cross (2); Bronze Star Medal

Brad M. Sullivan is a retired United States Air Force major general who last served as the chief of staff for the United Nations Command and United States Forces Korea. He previously served as commander of the Curtis E. LeMay Center for Doctrine Development and Education and vice commander of the Air University.

Military offices
Preceded by ???	Director of Intelligence and Information of the United States Northern Command; 2015–2017	Succeeded by Daniel L. Simpson
Preceded by Christopher Bentley	Deputy Director for Operations (Operations Team One) of the Joint Staff; 2017–2019	Succeeded by Rodney D. Lewis
Preceded by Michael D. Rothstein	Vice Commander of the Air University; 2019–2021	Succeeded by William G. Holt II
Preceded by Stephen C. Williams	Chief of Staff of the United States Forces Korea; 2021–2023	Succeeded by Michael D. Owens
Preceded by Mark Toy	Chief of Staff of the United Nations Command; 2022–2023	Succeeded by Michael D. Owens
