= Air University (United States Air Force) =

U.S. Air Force military education institution

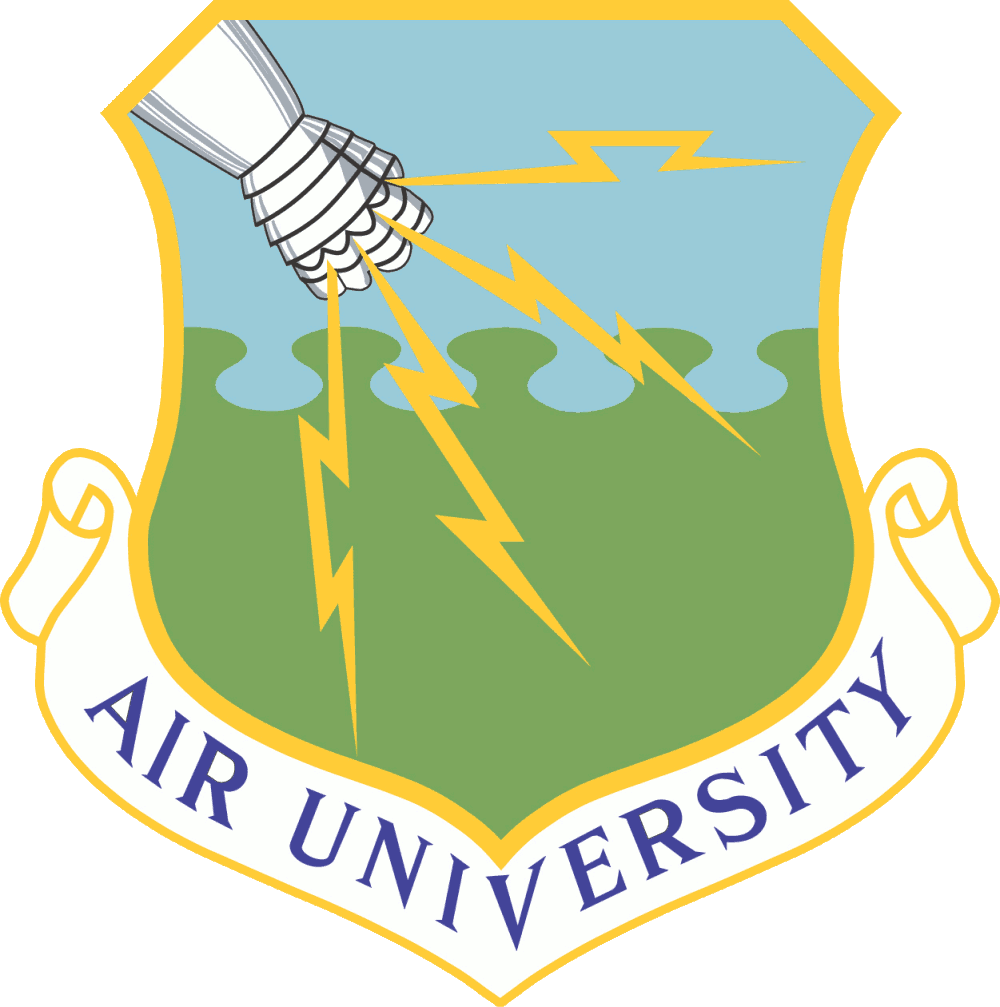
- Type: University system
- Established: 12 March 1946
- Parent institution: Air Education and Training Command
- Deputy Commander: Maj Gen Nathan L. Owendoff
- Location: Maxwell Air Force Base, Alabama
- Website: airuniversity.af.edu

Air University is a professional military education university system of the United States Air Force. It is accredited by the Commission on Colleges of the Southern Association of Colleges and Schools to award master's degrees.

== Organizations ==
Air Force Institute of Technology (AFIT)
Carl A. Spaatz Center for Officer Education
USAF Air War College (AWC)
Air Command and Staff College (ACSC)
Squadron Officer School (SOS)
International Officers School (IOS)
School of Advanced Air and Space Studies (SAASS)
USAF Center for Strategic Deterrence Studies
Curtis E. Lemay Center for Doctrine Development & Education
Air Force Global College (AFGC)
Community College of the Air Force (CCAF)
Civilian Leadership Development School (CLDS)
Ira C. Eaker College for Professional Development
Air Force Chaplain Corps College
Air Force Personnel Professional Development School
Commanders' Professional Development School
Defense Financial Management & Comptroller School
National Security Space Institute
Jeanne M. Holm Center for Officer Accessions and Citizen Development
Air Force Officer Training School (OTS)
Air Force Reserve Officer Training Corps (AFROTC)
Air Force Junior Reserve Officer Training Corps (AFJROTC)
Civilian Acculturation and Leadership Training (CALT)
Thomas N. Barnes Center for Enlisted Education
Airman Leadership School (ALS)
Air Force Career Development Academy
Air Force Enlisted Heritage Research Institute (AFEHRI)
Air Force Senior Noncommissioned Officer Academy (SNCOA)
Air Force Noncommissioned Officer Academy (NCOA)
Enlisted Professional Military Education Instructor Course (EPMEIC)
Chief Master Sergeant Leadership Course (CLC)
USAF First Sergeant Academy (FSA)
USAF Center for Counterproliferation Studies
Air University Press
Air Force Fellows Program (AFF)
Air Force Historical Research Agency (AFHRA)
China Aerospace Studies Institute (CASI)

== Schools and centers ==
The institutions that fall under Air University include:

=== Officer professional military education ===
The Carl A. Spaatz Center for Officer Education (Spaatz Center) unified the continuum of Air Force officer professional military education. Activated in 2008, the Spaatz Center was named in honor of the Air Force's first chief of staff, General Carl A. Spaatz. The center was disestablished in 2017.

==== Squadron Officer School ====
The Squadron Officer School in-residence program is a 6.5-week course for USAF captains. The course is structured around four primary areas: Leadership, building highly-effective teams, logical and ethical reasoning in decision making, and multi-domain joint warfare.

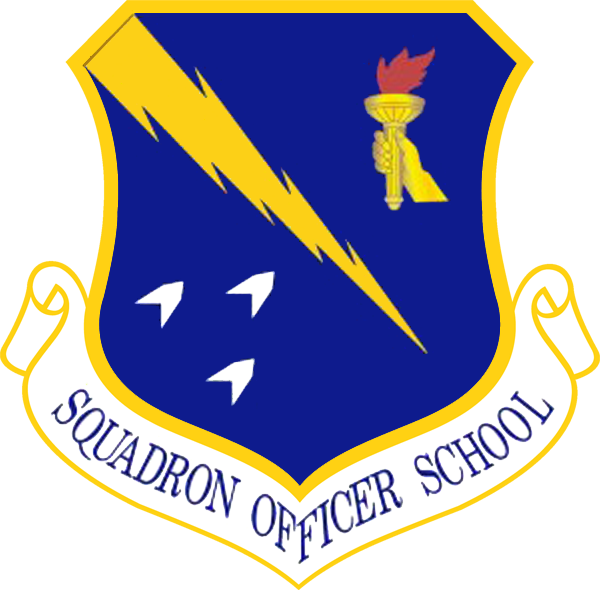
Squadron Officer School emblem

==== Air Command and Staff College ====
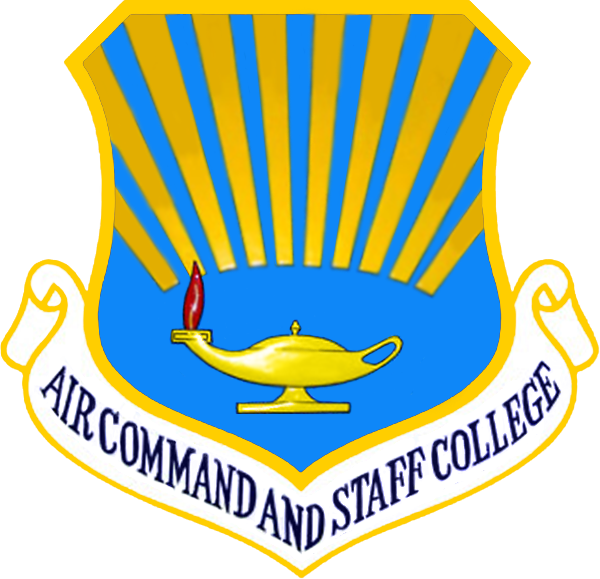
Air Command And Staff College emblem

The Air Command and Staff College (ACSC) is a 10-month master's-level resident program that prepares field grade USAF, U.S. Army and USMC officers in pay grade O-4 and USN / USCG officers in pay grade O-4, their international counterparts, and U.S. civilian equivalents, for positions of higher responsibility within the military and other government agencies. Often referred to as "intermediate level education" (ILE), intermediate level professional military education (intermediate level PME) or phase I joint PME, ACSC is also available via "distance learning", primarily a CD-ROM enabled correspondence course.

==== Air War College ====
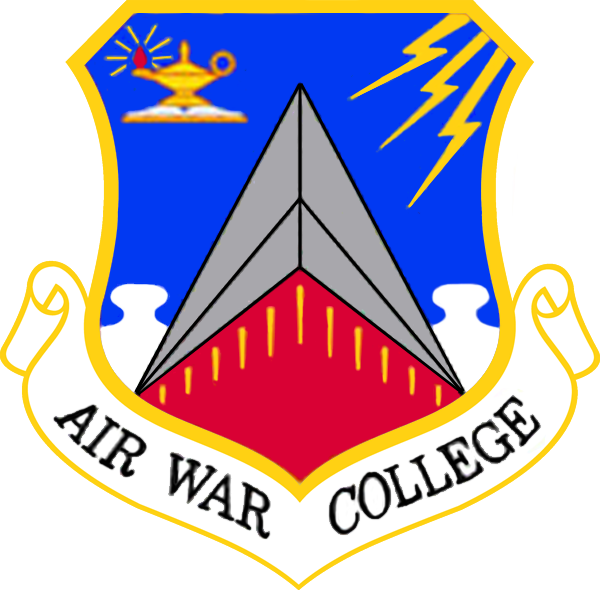
Air War College emblem

The USAF Air War College (AWC) is a 10-month resident course for USAF, U.S. Army and USMC lieutenant colonels and colonels (pay grades O-5 and O-6), USN and USCG commanders and captains (pay grade O-5 and O-6), their international counterparts, and Department of Defense and Department of the Air Force civilian equivalents (GS-14/GM-14, GS-15/GM-15). AWC prepares students to lead in a joint, interagency and multi-national environment at the strategic level of military operations. Also known as "senior developmental education" (SDE), senior level PME, or (since 2010) phase II JPME, AWC is also available at the Pentagon and selected active USAF installations as a 10-month seminar program paralleling the academic year and course content of the resident course. It is also available via "distance learning" as a correspondence course typically requiring 18 to 24 months to complete.

The Secretary of the Air Force's annual National Security Forum (NSF) conducted for select influential civilian leaders in business, industry, state and local government, law, academia, media, and the clergy is administered and hosted by the AWC.

==== International Officer School ====
The International Officer School is a seven-week course designed to provide international officers an enhanced understanding of the United States and prepares them for attending Squadron Officer School, Air Command and Staff College, or the Air War College.

=== Enlisted professional military education ===
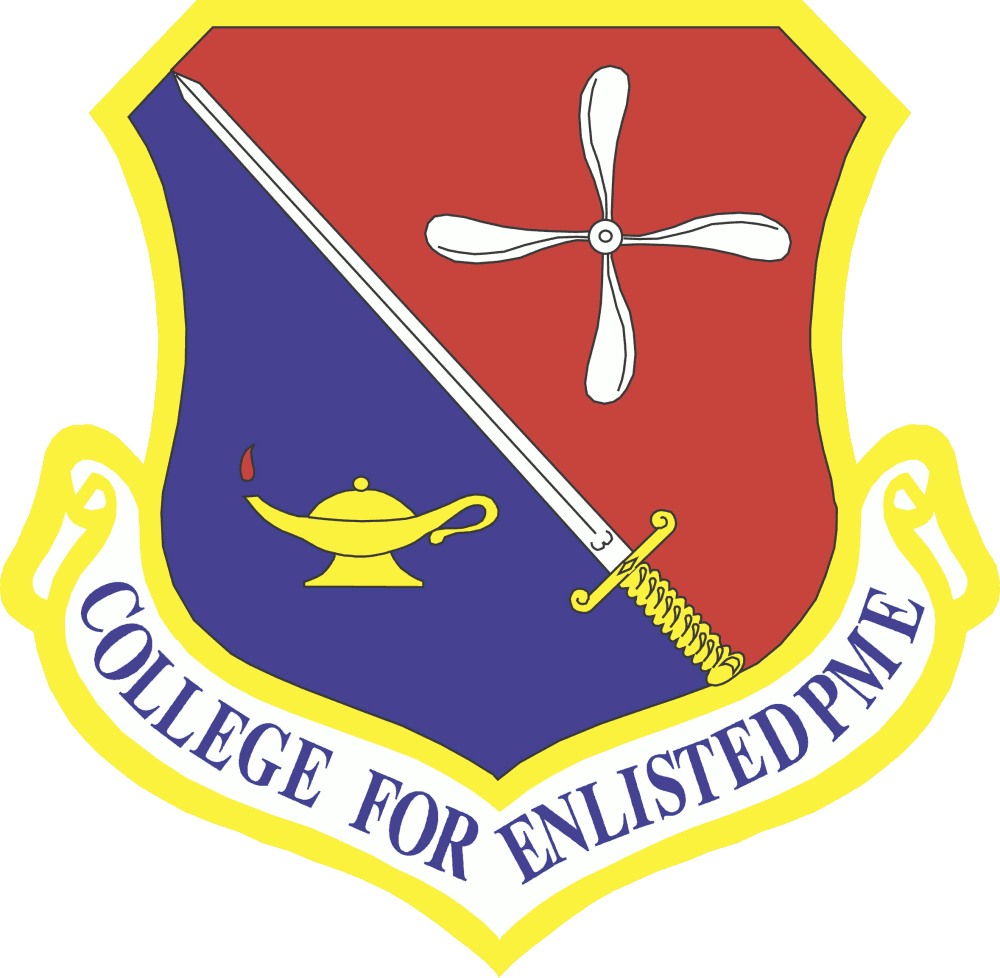
College for Enlisted Professional Military Education emblem

The Thomas N. Barnes Center for Enlisted Education (Barnes Center, formerly the College for Enlisted Professional Military Education) is responsible for the instructional programs and faculty development for all Air Force enlisted professional military education programs. This includes the airman leadership schools, noncommissioned officer academies, and the Air Force Senior Noncommissioned Officer Academy.

==== Air Force Senior Noncommissioned Officer Academy ====
The Air Force Senior Noncommissioned Officer Academy graduates more than 1,800 Air Force chief master sergeant selectees, senior master sergeants, senior master sergeant selectees, and non-commissioned officers and chief petty officers from other U.S. military services and the services of international U.S.-allied nations annually. It is located on Maxwell AFB's Gunter Annex.

==== NCO academies ====
The NCO academies provide selected noncommissioned officers education. Several NCO academies operate worldwide on various Air Force installations.

==== Airman Leadership School ====
The goal of the program is to provide senior airmen an opportunity to understand more fully their position in the USAF organizational structure and the continued need for professional development to be effective NCOs.

==== Enlisted Heritage Research Institute ====
The Enlisted Heritage Research Institute is dedicated to preserving the history of the enlisted corps of the U.S. Air Force and U.S. Army Aeronautical Division, Air Service, Air Corps, and Air Forces in the development of air power to defend the United States. The institute achieves this by featuring artifacts, collections, and pictorial exhibits, written and oral documentation, audiovisuals, equipment, and selected aircraft parts. Additionally, students use the in-house and online research capabilities to enhance learning and complete enlisted heritage research projects.

=== Officer accessions ===
Air Force ROTC emblem

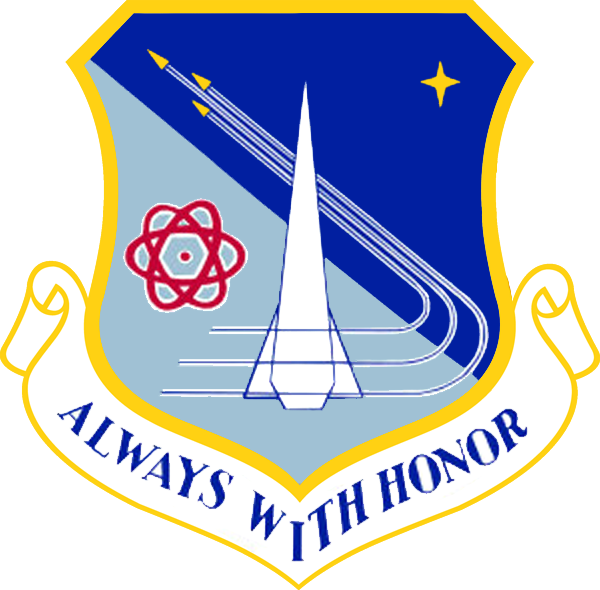
Officer Training School emblem

The Jeanne M. Holm Center for Officer Accessions and Citizen Development (Holm Center), previously known as Air Force Officer Accession and Training Schools (AFOATS), operates two of the four USAF officer commissioning sources. These are the Air Force Reserve Officer Training Corps (AFROTC) at civilian colleges and universities across the United States, and the Air Force Officer Training School (OTS) at Maxwell AFB.

Although it is a USAF officer accession and training program, the United States Air Force Academy (USAFA) does not fall under Air University. This was also true of Air National Guard's since-disestablished Academy of Military Science, which has now been merged into OTS at Maxwell AFB. The U.S. Air Force Academy is a Direct Reporting Unit (DRU), and the superintendent of the USAF Academy reports directly to the Chief of Staff of the Air Force. Admission to and administration of the ANG Academy of Military Science was controlled by the director of the Air National Guard via the National Guard Bureau (NGB). The director of the Air National Guard and the NGB still control input of prospective direct accession ANG officers via OTS.

=== Citizenship Development, Aerospace Education, and associated programs ===
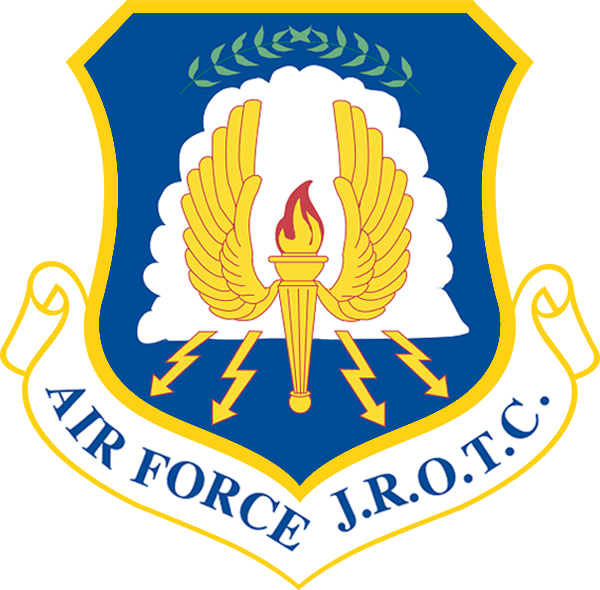
Junior ROTC emblem

==== Air Force Junior Reserve Officer Training Corps ====
The Air Force Junior Reserve Officer Training Corps (AFJROTC) program provides citizenship training and air and space science education via a cadet program for high school students in grades 9 through 12 at various high schools across the United States and at select Department of Defense Dependent Schools (DoDDS) at US military installations overseas. Instruction is conducted by retired field grade USAF officers employed by the respective school systems, assisted by retired USAF senior non-commissioned officers under similar employment.

AFJROTC is a "citizenship program" for high school students and should not be confused with AFROTC, which is a "pre-commissioning program" for four-year college and university students to become Air Force officers.

==== Academic education ====
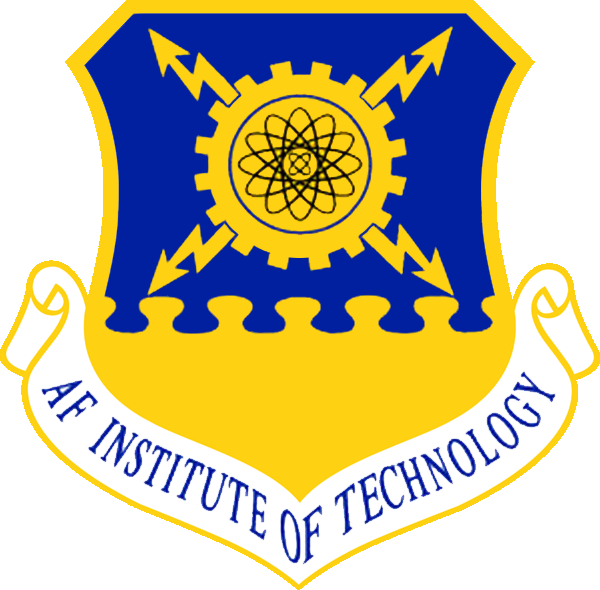
Air Force Institute of Technology emblem

The Air Force Institute of Technology (AFIT) is a geographically separated unit (GSU) of Air University, located at Wright-Patterson AFB, Ohio.

The Community College of the Air Force (CCAF) is the only degree-granting institution of higher learning in the world dedicated exclusively to enlisted military personnel. CCAF offers educational opportunities for active duty, Air National Guard and Air Force Reserve airmen and NCOs to earn a job-related Associate of Applied Science degree. CCAF also facilitates selected professional certification and recognition for airmen. Possession of a CCAF degree has in recent years become a de facto mandatory requirement for promotion to senior master sergeant and higher, regardless of whether or not the candidate has a civilian degree such as a baccalaureate. This de facto status is now official: starting with the 2007 promotion cycle, promotion candidates cannot receive critical endorsements on performance reports without having first received an associate degree from CCAF.

=== Professional continuing education ===
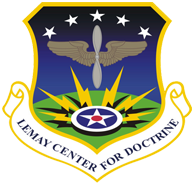

The Curtis E. LeMay Center for Doctrine Development and Education (LeMay Center), previously known as the Air Force Doctrine Development and Education Center, develops and publishes Air Force doctrine, teaches doctrine through resident and on-line courses, and advocates air power through visionary war gaming, and provides integration and outreach services for Air University.

The Ira C. Eaker College for Professional Development provides continuing education and technical training to Air Force and other Department of Defense personnel and international officers, including resident and distance-learning courses for a variety of Air Force specialties.

=== United States Air Force Center for Strategic Deterrence Studies ===
The USAF Counterproliferation Center (CPC) was established in 1998 at the direction of the Chief of Staff of the Air Force. Located at Maxwell AFB, this center capitalizes on the resident expertise of Air University, while extending its reach far beyond - and influences a wide audience of leaders and policy makers. A memorandum of agreement between the Air Staff's Director for Nuclear and Counterproliferation (then AF/XON) and Air War College commandant established the initial personnel and responsibilities of the center. This included integrating counterproliferation awareness into the curriculum and ongoing research at Air University; establishing an information repository to promote research on counterproliferation and nonproliferation issues; and directing research on the various topics associated with counterproliferation and nonproliferation .

In 2008, the Secretary of Defense's Task Force on Nuclear Weapons Management recommended "Air Force personnel connected to the nuclear mission be required to take a professional military education (PME) course on national, defense, and Air Force concepts for deterrence and defense." This led to the addition of three teaching positions to the CPC in 2011 to enhance nuclear PME efforts. At the same time, the Air Force Nuclear Weapons Center, in coordination with the AF/A10 and Air Force Global Strike Command, established a series of courses at Kirtland AFB to provide professional continuing education (PCE) through the careers of those Air Force personnel working in or supporting the nuclear enterprise. This mission was transferred to the CPC in 2012, broadening its mandate to providing education and research on not just countering WMD but also nuclear operations issues. In April 2016, the nuclear PCE courses were transferred from the Air War College to the U.S. Air Force Institute for Technology.

In February 2014, the center's name was changed to the Center for Unconventional Weapons Studies (CUWS) to reflect its broad coverage of unconventional weapons issues, both offensive and defensive, across the six joint operating concepts (deterrence operations, cooperative security, major combat operations, irregular warfare, stability operations, and homeland security). The term "unconventional weapons", currently defined as nuclear, biological, and chemical weapons, also includes the improvised use of chemical, biological, and radiological hazards. In May 2018, the name changed again to the Center for Strategic Deterrence Studies (CSDS) in recognition of senior Air Force interest in focusing on this national security topic.

The center's military insignia displays the symbols of nuclear, biological, and chemical hazards. The arrows above the hazards represent the four aspects of counterproliferation - counterforce, active defense, passive defense, and consequence management. The Latin inscription "Armis Bella Venenis Geri" means "weapons of war involving poisons".

=== Advanced Professional Military Education ===
"We're going out to find the Billy Mitchells while they're still majors and captains."

— Colonel William F. Fortner, First Director of SAASS.

The School of Advanced Air and Space Studies is the "Air Force graduate school for airpower and space power strategists". The school began as the School of Advanced Airpower Studies. It began operation on July 22, 1991, at Maxwell Air Force Base, Alabama. The first class of 25 students was all-male, although later classes included women. Most of the first class came from the U.S. Air Force's Air Command and Staff College. The first director of the school, Colonel William F. Fortner, stated that the school's goal was to "create the soldier-scholars for conflicts of the future". Fortner likened the school to the U.S. Army's School of Advanced Military Studies, but stated that the new school's curriculum would go "much deeper into the study of air-power history, doctrine and strategy". The curriculum, planned for a duration of 11 months, was taught by a faculty of nine civilian and military Ph.D. instructors. The curriculum in the first years comprised two parts, focusing on "the past and present of warfare". Students read about 150 pages per night, and wrote and defended a research paper.

== Associated Agencies ==
=== Air Force Historical Research Agency ===
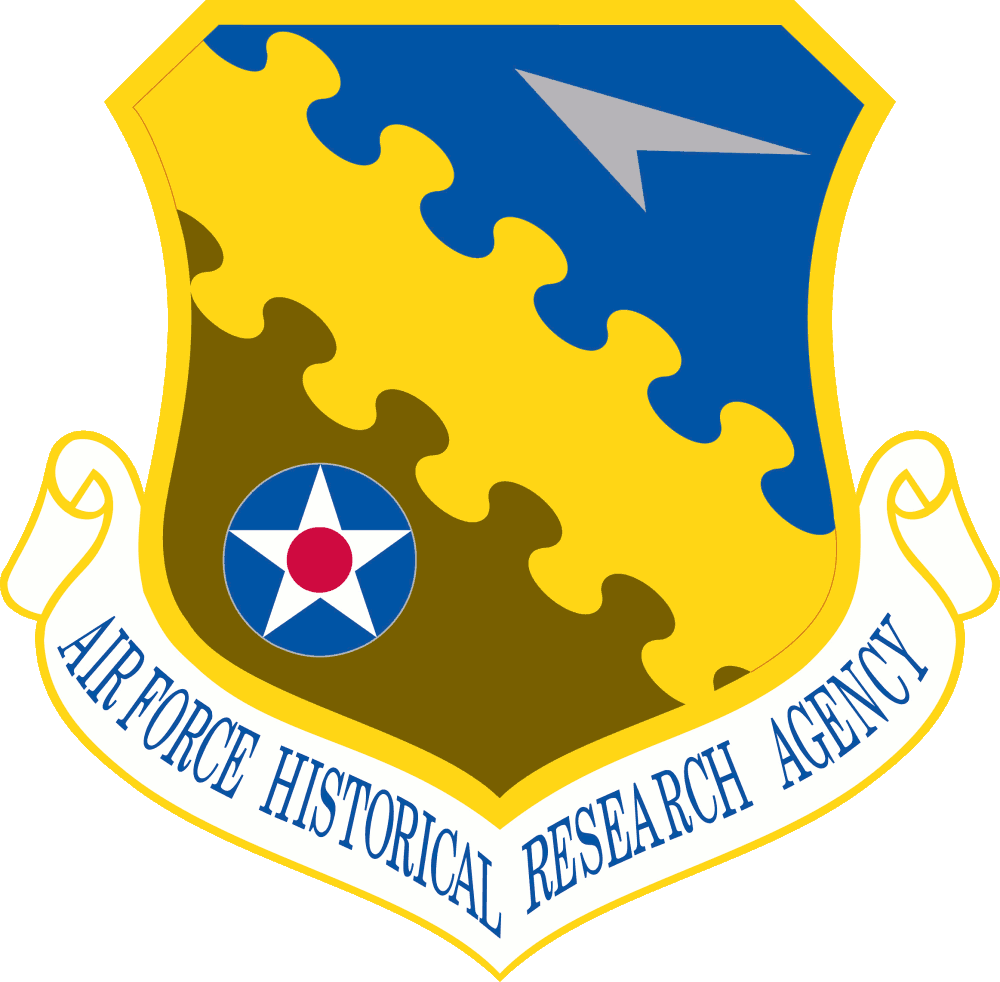

The Air Force Historical Research Agency is the repository for United States Air Force historical documents.

The agency's collection, begun during World War II in Washington, DC, moved in 1949 to Maxwell Air Force Base, the site of the present-day Air University, to provide research facilities for professional military education students, the faculty, visiting scholars, and the general public. The Air Force Historical Research Agency is now a forward operating agency (FOA) assigned directly to the Air Force History and Museums Program, and a tenant unit at Maxwell AFB.

== History ==
=== Lineage ===
- 1946 Air University Patch
  Authorized as the Air Service School by the War Department on 25 February 1920, and established that same year, exact date unknown
- Redesignated: Air Service Field Officers' School on 10 February 1921
- Redesignated: Air Service Tactical School on 8 November 1922
- Redesignated: Air Corps Tactical School on 18 August 1926
- Discontinued on 9 October 1942
- Established as: Army Air Forces School of Applied Tactics, 16 Oct 1942

History and insignia of Air Corps Tactical School bestowed upon activation.

- Redesignated as: Army Air Forces School on 1 June 1945

Established as Major Command: 29 November 1945

- Redesignated as: Air University on 12 March 1946

Reassigned to Air Training Command on 15 May 1978, losing major command status
Returned to major command status effective 1 July 1983
Changed from a major command of the United States Air Force to a subordinate organization of Air Education and Training Command on 1 July 1993.

=== Stations ===
- Langley Field, Virginia, 25 Feb 1920 - 14 Jul 1931
- Maxwell Field, Alabama, 15 Jul 1931 – 9 Oct 1942
- Orlando Army Air Base, Florida, 16 Oct 1942 - 29 Nov 1945
- Maxwell Field (later Maxwell AFB), Alabama, 29 Nov 1945 – Present

=== Components ===
During the years 1943–1945, the Army Air Forces School of Applied Tactics (AAFSAT) at Orlando Army Air Base, Florida operated a massive air-to-air and air-to-ground combat simulation facility across Central Florida. Units and various main operating bases and auxiliary airfields were established throughout an 8,000-square-mile (21,000 km^{2}) area of central Florida designated as a mock "war theater" and stretching roughly from Tampa through Orlando, east to Titusville, north to Starke, and northwest to Apalachicola in which air war games were conducted. Following the end of World War II, the simulation facility ceased operation and most of the operating air bases and auxiliary airfields were either placed in military caretaker status or returned to local civilian control. On 1 Jun 1945, the AAFSAT was redesignated as the Army Air Forces School (AAFS). On 29 Nov 1945, the AAFS relocated from Orlando AAB, Florida to Maxwell Field, Alabama.

=== Operations ===
The Wright Brothers established the first U.S. civilian flying school in Montgomery, Alabama in 1910. By the 1920s, Montgomery became an important link in the growing system of aerial mail service. It was in the early 1930s when the Army Air Corps Tactical School moved to Maxwell Field and Montgomery became the country's intellectual center for airpower education.

==== Origins ====
As a result of the U.S. Army Reorganization Act of 1920, the Air Service authorized the establishment of an Air Service School on 10 February 1921 at Langley Field, Virginia. To reflect its primary mission of preparing senior officers for higher Air Service duty, the Air Service redesignated the Air Service School as the Air Service Field Officers' School.

Following the decision to let all Air Service officers attend the institution in 1922, the Air Service redesignated the Air Service Field Officers' School as the Air Service Tactical School. In conjunction with the 1926 redesignation of the Army Air Service as the Army Air Corps, the Air Service Tactical School became the Air Corps Tactical School. To take advantage of the propitious climate and facilities expansion potential, the Army Air Corps began moving the Air Corps Tactical School from Langley Field in Virginia in 1931 to Maxwell Field, Alabama.

==== World War II ====
Because of the wartime need for officers of the caliber of those attending the Maxwell institution, in May 1941 the Army Air Corps suspended instruction at the tactical school and reduced its faculty and staff to seven officers. Anticipating the institution's eventual reopening, the Army Air Corps moved the skeletonized Air Corps Tactical School to Washington, DC, and placed it under the Directorate of Individual Training. In spite of the institution's successful efforts in developing Air Corps planners and leaders, the Air Corps discontinued the Air Corps Tactical School on 9 October 1942 with the intention of reopening it after the war.

To partially fill the educational void left by the discontinuance of the Tactical School and to correct the growing shortage of experienced Air Corps, later renamed Army Air Forces, officers, the Army Air Forces authorized the establishment of the Army Air Forces School of Applied Tactics on 9 Oct 42. The Army Air Forces activated the AAF School of Applied Tactics at Orlando Army Air Base, Florida, with the mission to train "selected officers" under simulated combat conditions. Based on lessons learned in the combat theaters and the school's actual operational experiences, the AAF established the AAF Tactical Center with the AAF School of Applied Tactics as a subordinate unit. Due to a major reorganization of the Tactical Center and a change in the types of courses conducted by the institution, the Army Air Forces redesignated the AAF School of Applied Tactics as the Army Air Forces School on 1 Jun 45.

==== Postwar era ====
In preparation for its post-war educational operations, the Army Air Forces transferred the Army Air Forces School from Orlando AAB to Maxwell Field, Alabama, on 29 November 1945 and assigned it directly to Headquarters, U.S. Army Air Forces (HQ AAF) as a major command.

In the first conclave of its kind since the end of World War II, the AAF Educational Conference ended after a three-day meeting on 20 Feb 1945 to discuss the post-war AAF educational structure. The Army Air Forces began the first instructor training course in March 1946 for preparing instructors to teach at the post-war AAF educational institutions.

HQ AAF redesignated the Army Air Forces School as Air University (AU) on 12 March 1946 and established the Air War College, Air Command and Staff School, and Air Tactical School as its subordinate units. The AU commander organized the Air University Board of Visitors, composed of senior educators and university administrators, to meet regularly and advise him on educational matters.

Air University became operational on 1 April 1946 when HQ AAF transferred the School of Aviation Medicine at Randolph Field, Texas, from Air Training Command to Air University. To take advantage of existing facilities, Air University transferred the Air Tactical School from Maxwell Field to Tyndall Field, Florida on 21 May 1946. Major General Orvil A. Anderson was appointed the first commandant of the Air War College, the senior school in the three-tiered AAF officer professional military education (PME) system.

Assuming responsibilities comparable to those of the Army and Navy advisers on the HQ AU staff, the Royal Air Force Liaison Officer also became a part of the HQ AU staff on 1 June 1946. When members of the Air University Board of Visitors concluded their first meeting with such dignitaries as General Carl Spaatz, Commanding General of the Army Air Forces; Air Marshall Hugh Pughe Lloyd of the Royal Air Force; and the class members of the Air War College and the Air Command and Staff School participating, Air University was officially dedicated during a ceremony at Maxwell Field.

Classes began at the Air War College and the Air Command and Staff School on 4 September 1946, fulfilling the "dream for education in airpower" of most post-war AAF leaders and planners. The Air Tactical School, the junior officer PME program of the AU educational system, began classes at Tyndall in January 1947. Later that year, the Royal Canadian Air Force sent its first group of students to the two-week indoctrination course at Maxwell. With Secretary of War Robert P. Patterson as the guest speaker, the Air War College and the Air Command and Staff School conducted a combined graduation ceremony for 185 senior and field grade officers.

As a result of the National Security Act of 1947, the United States Air Force became a separate and independent branch of the U.S. military on 18 September 1947. In keeping with the Air Force's new status, Headquarters, U.S. Air Force (HQ USAF) redesignated Maxwell Field as Maxwell Air Force Base on 13 January 1948.

On 12 July 1949, HQ USAF established the Air University Human Resources Research Institute. It was one of three USAF field agencies created to conduct research on the human factor in Air Force planning and operations. Air University established the 3894th AU School Squadron to provide administrative support to Air Force instructors and students at the various service schools operated by the Army, Navy, and Marine Corps.

The USAF Historical Division relocated to Maxwell AFB from Washington, DC in September 1949 and became a part of the Air University Library. The combined activity is now known as the Air Force Historical Research Agency (AFHRA).

== Academic degrees and accreditation ==
Air University is accredited by the Commission of Colleges of the Southern Association of Colleges and Schools (SACS), and is authorized to grant the following degrees:

- Master of Strategic Studies – offered by the Air War College
- Master of Military Operational Art and Science – offered by the Air Command and Staff College (ACSC)
- Master of Aerospace Studies – offered by the School of Advanced Air and Space Studies (SAASS)
- Master of Science in Flight Test Engineering – offered by the U.S. Air Force Test Pilot School (USAFTPS)
- Associate in Applied Science – offered for USAF enlisted personnel by the Community College of the Air Force (CCAF) with majors in 68 areas

In 2010, SACS upgraded AU's accreditation to Level V, a move that will eventually enable AU to eventually award three different doctoral degrees.

Air University was also awarded the Space Foundation's inaugural Space Achievement Award in 1995. This award recognizes individuals or organizations for space achievement, breakthrough space technology or program or product success representing critical milestones in the evolution of space exploration and development.

== List of commanders ==
- Lieutenant General Troup Miller Jr., 1 August 1961 – December 1963
- Lieutenant General Ralph Powell Swofford Jr., January 1964 – August 1965
- Lieutenant General Alvan C. Gillem II, 1 August 1970 – November 1973
- 14: Lt. Gen. Raymond B. Furlong, August 1975 – 1 July 1979
- 15: Lt. Gen. Stanley M. Umstead Jr., 1 July 1979 – July 1981
- 16: Lt. Gen. Charles G. Cleveland, July 1981 – August 1984
- 17: Lt. Gen. Thomas C. Richards, August 1984 – November 1986
- 18: Lt. Gen. Truman Spangrud, November 1986 – July 1988
- 19: Lt. Gen. Ralph E. Havens, July 1988 – October 1989
- Vacant, October 1989 – January 1990
- 20: Lt. Gen. Charles G. Boyd, January 1990 – October 1992
- 21: Lt. Gen. Jay W. Kelley, October 1992 – October 1996
- 24: Lt. Gen. Joseph J. Redden, October 1996 – July 1999

No.	Commander		Term		
No.	Portrait	Name	Took office	Left office	Duration
Commandant, Air University
1	Muir S. Fairchild	Major General; Muir S. Fairchild (1894–1950)	15 March 1946	17 May 1948	2 years, 63 days
2	Robert W. Harper	Major General; Robert W. Harper (1900–1982)	17 May 1948	15 October 1948	151 days
3	George C. Kenney	General; George C. Kenney (1889–1977)	16 October 1948	27 July 1951	2 years, 284 days
4	Idwal H. Edwards	Lieutenant General; Idwal H. Edwards (1895–1981)	28 July 1951	28 February 1953	1 year, 215 days
Commander, Air University
25	Donald A. Lamontagne	Lieutenant General; Donald A. Lamontagne (born 1947)	May 2001	July 2004	~3 years, 61 days
26	John F. Regni	Lieutenant General; John F. Regni	July 2004	October 2005	~1 year, 92 days
27	Stephen R. Lorenz	Lieutenant General; Stephen R. Lorenz	October 2005	June 2008	~2 years, 273 days
28	Allen G. Peck	Lieutenant General; Allen G. Peck	July 2008	12 August 2011	~3 years, 42 days
Commander and President, Air University
29	David S. Fadok	Lieutenant General; David S. Fadok	12 August 2011	10 November 2014	3 years, 90 days
30	Steven L. Kwast	Lieutenant General; Steven L. Kwast	10 November 2014	16 November 2017	3 years, 6 days
-	Michael D. Rothstein	Major General; Michael D. Rothstein; Acting	16 November 2017	15 February 2018	91 days
31	Anthony J. Cotton	Lieutenant General; Anthony J. Cotton	15 February 2018	October 2019	~1 year, 228 days
-	Brad M. Sullivan	Major General; Brad M. Sullivan; Acting	October 2019	22 November 2019	~44 days
32	James Hecker	Lieutenant General; James Hecker	22 November 2019	27 June 2022	2 years, 217 days
-	William G. Holt	Major General; William G. Holt; Acting	27 June 2022	25 July 2022	28 days
33	Andrea Tullos	Lieutenant General; Andrea Tullos	25 July 2022	7 November 2025	3 years, 105 days
34	Daniel Tulley	Lieutenant General; Daniel Tulley	7 November 2025	~3 August 2026	~269 days
-	Nathan L. Owendoff	Major General; Nathan L. Owendoff; Acting	~3 August 2026	Incumbent	100 days

== See also ==
- Army University
- Marine Corps University
