= Squadron Officer School =

U.S. Air Force military education institution

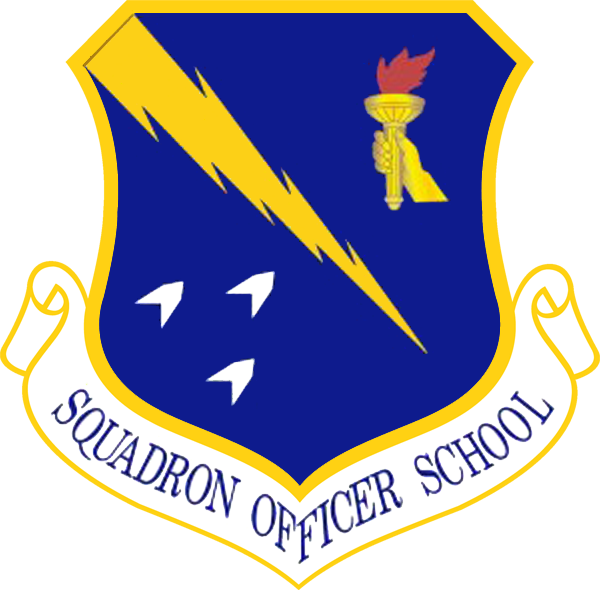
- Squadron Officer School emblem
- Active: 1 November 1954 to present
- Country: United States of America
- Branch: Air Force
- Type: Professional Military Education
- Size: 4,200 students annually
- Part of: Squadron Officer College, Air University, Air Education and Training Command
- Base: Maxwell AFB, AL
- Colors: Blue and gold
- Decorations: Air Force Outstanding Unit Award (4), Air Force Organizational Excellence Award (10)
- Website: https://www.airuniversity.af.edu/SOS/

Commanders
- Current commander: Colonel Kevin Lee

Squadron Officer School (SOS), is a 5.5-week-long professional military education (PME) course for U.S. Air Force and Space Force captains, Department of the Air Force Civilian (DAFC) equivalents and International Officers. It fulfills the U.S. Air Force's requirement for primary developmental education (PDE). SOS is based at Maxwell AFB, Alabama, and the in-residence version of the course is taught there. SOS is an element of Air University.

The Distance Learning version of SOS is conducted by the Air Force Global College (AFGC) - College of Online Professional Military Education (COOL PME), a separate school within Air University. It has different curriculum and admission eligibility than the in-residence version.

Unlike the more senior courses at Air University (e.g., Air Command and Staff College and Air War College), attendance at SOS does not include any U.S. officers from sister services.

Eligible senior members of the Civil Air Patrol (CAP), the civilian U.S. Air Force Auxiliary, who hold the rank of captain or above are entitled to attend SOS. The curriculum is accessed by CAP student officers through the SOS distance learning platform.

== History ==
Squadron Officer School traces its roots to the Air Corps Tactical School, which was founded in 1926 and closed in 1946. When SOS was established at Maxwell AFB in 1950, it became an arm of Air Command and Staff College. Colonel Russell V. Ritchey, USAF, was the founder of SOS and its first commandant. In 1959, SOS became a separate Air University school reporting directly to the Air University commander.

Originally established as a 12-week in-residence program at Maxwell AFB, SOS was shortened to an 8-week program in the early 1990s due, in part, to post-Cold War budgetary pressures.

In 1997, in an effort to emulate The Basic School (TBS) program of the U.S. Marine Corps, the Air Force established the Air and Space Basic Course (ASBC) for all newly commissioned Second Lieutenants in the Regular Air Force, the Air Force Reserve and Air National Guard, regardless of commissioning source (e.g., USAFA, AFROTC, Air Force OTS, Academy of Military Science, direct commission, etc.), graduating its first class of Second Lieutenants in early 1998. Concurrent with this action, the Air Force shortened the in-residence SOS curriculum to 5 weeks. ASBC shared Building 1403 at Maxwell AFB with SOS until military construction at Maxwell AFB later expanded classroom space for both schools. In 2000, both ASBC and SOS merged to form an integrated Squadron Officer College (SOC), with both schools sharing a common curriculum directorate and mission support staff.

SOC's mission changed again in 2011 with a decision by the Air Force to eliminate ASBC, extend SOS from 5 weeks back to 8 weeks, change SOC's name back to SOS, and pursue 100% SOS resident attendance opportunity for all Line-of-the-Air Force captains. In 2017, the program was streamlined again to its current duration of 6.5 weeks.

Since its activation, the Squadron Officer School has received the following awards and recognition:

Air Force Outstanding Unit Award (four times)

- January 1, 1969 – December 31, 1970
- January 1, 1973 – December 31, 1974
- May 1, 1980 – April 30, 1982
- January 1, 1983 – December 31, 1984

Air Force Organizational Excellence Award (ten times)

- January 1, 1985 – May 31, 1986
- July 1, 1993 – June 30, 1995
- July 1, 1997 – June 30, 1998
- July 1, 1998 – February 7, 2000
- February 8, 2000 – June 30, 2001
- July 1, 2002 – June 30, 2003
- July 1, 2003 – June 30, 2004
- July 1, 2005 – June 30, 2006
- July 1, 2006 – June 30, 2007
- July 1, 2007 – June 30, 2008

== Transfer Credit ==
Some colleges and universities recognize Squadron Officer School graduates with graduate-level transfer credits. Some of these programs include:

- American Military University and American Public University allow up to nine semester hours of transfer credit to SOS graduates to be applied for a graduate degree.
- Central Michigan University allows for three semester hours of transfer credit to be applied by SOS graduates to a graduate degree.
- University of Oklahoma allows for three semester hours of transfer credit to be applied by SOS in-residence graduates to a graduate degree.
