= Camm, Virginia =

Unincorporated community in Virginia, United States

Coordinates: 37°38′46″N 78°35′35″W

Camm is an unincorporated community in Buckingham County, in the U.S. state of Virginia.
