= South Pacific Division =

One of the eight permanent divisions of the U.S. Army Corps of Engineers

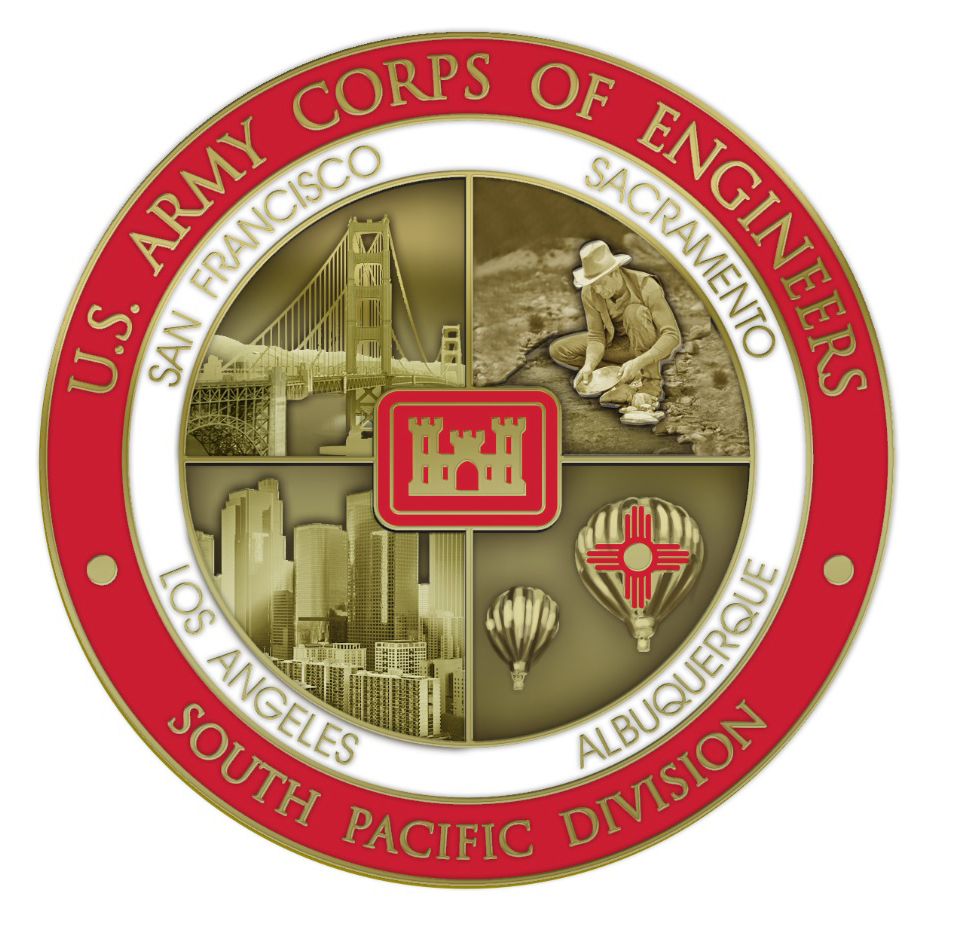
Division emblem

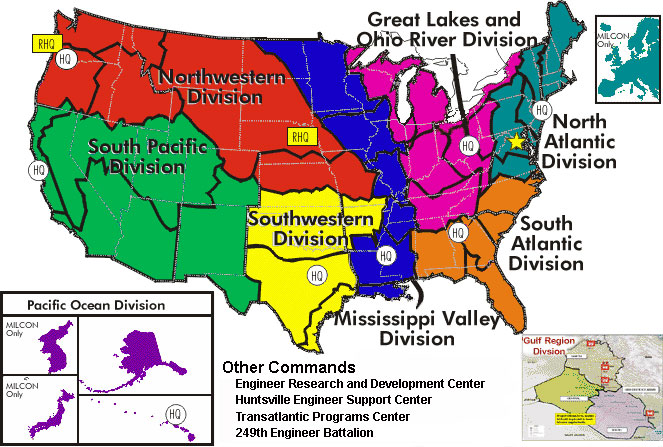
USACE South Pacific Division, shown in bright green

The United States Army Corps of Engineers South Pacific Division (SPD) is an Army organization providing civil works and military water resource services/infrastructure. It also supports economically viable and environmentally sustainable watershed management and water resources development in California, Arizona, Nevada, Utah and New Mexico and is also responsible for parts of Oregon, Idaho, Wyoming, Colorado and Texas. It is headquartered in San Francisco, California.

The South Pacific Division has four districts:

- Albuquerque District
- Los Angeles District
- Sacramento District
- San Francisco District

The Division Commander is directly responsible to the Chief of Engineers. Within the authorities delegated, the SPD Commander directs and supervises the individual District Commanders. SPD duties include:

- Preparing engineering studies and design.
- Constructing, operating, and maintaining flood control and river and harbor facilities and installations.
- Administering the laws on civil works activities.
- Acquiring, managing, and disposing of real estate.
- Mobilization support of military, natural disaster, and national emergency operations.
