= Professional military education =

Professional training and schooling of military personnel

Professional military education (PME) is the professional training, development, and schooling of military personnel. It encompasses many schools, universities, and training programs designed to foster leadership in military service members.

== See also ==
- Professional military education in the United States Air Force
- Enlisted Professional Military Education (EPME)
- Joint Professional Military Education
