= Leiser =

Leiser is a surname. Notable people with the surname include:

- Alfred Leiser (born 1929), Swiss racewalker
- Brian Leiser (better known as Fast, born 1972), American musician
- Clara Leiser (c. 1898–1991), American writer, journalist, and activist
- David Leiser (born 1952), Israeli professor of psychology
- Eric Leiser, American filmmaker, animator and holographer
- Ernest Leiser (1921–2002), American executive producer and journalist
- Erwin Leiser (1923–1996), German Jew, director, writer and actor
- Jacques Leiser, American artists manager and photographer
- Louis G. Leiser (1927–2009), American major general in the United States Air Force
- Martin Leiser (born 1978), Swiss athlete
- Vreni Leiser (born 1945), Swiss sprinter
- Walter Leiser (1931–2023), Swiss rower

== See also ==
- Leiser Madanes (born 1950), Argentine writer, philosopher and professor
- Moshe Leiser and Patrice Caurier, Opera directors
