= Kristin Panzenhagen =

U.S. Space Force officer

- Official portrait, 2026
- Born: December 27, 1978 (age 47)
- Education: Purdue University (BS)
- Military career
- Allegiance: United States
- Branch: United States Air Force: United States Space Force
- Service years: 2000–2021 (Air Force): 2021–present (Space Force)
- Rank: Major General
- Commands: Assured Access to Space Directorate; Space Launch Delta 45; Eastern Range; Integrated Ground Enterprise Directorate, NRO; Foreign Materiel Exploitation Squadron, NASIC
- Conflicts: Iraq War
- Awards: Defense Distinguished Service Medal; Legion of Merit

Kristin Leigh Panzenhagen (born December 27, 1978) is a United States Space Force major general who served as program executive officer for Assured Access to Space, director of launch and range operations of Space Systems Command, commander of Space Launch Delta 45, and director of the Eastern Range. She previously served as the senior military assistant to the under secretary of the Air Force.

Panzenhagen entered the Air Force in 2000 as an aircraft maintenance officer, later transitioning to the developmental engineering career field. She has been deployed in support of Operation Southern Watch, Operation Iraqi Freedom, and Operation New Dawn as part of the Iraq War. In 2021, she was transferred to the Space Force.

== Education ==
Panzenhagen graduated from Robert E. Lee High School in Springfield, Virginia in 1996. She received a B.S. degree in aeronautical engineering in 2000 from Purdue University. In September 2002, she entered the Air Force Institute of Technology Graduate School of Engineering and Management. She also earned a master's degree in military studies from the Marine Corps University in 2012 and a master's degree in national resource strategy in 2017 from the National Defense University. She has also attended the Squadron Officer School, National Security Space Institute, Air Command and Staff College, Marine Corps Command and Staff College, Air War College, Defense Acquisition University, Dwight D. Eisenhower School for National Security and Resource Strategy, Harvard Kennedy School, and Alan L. Freed Associates as part of her professional military education.

== Military career ==
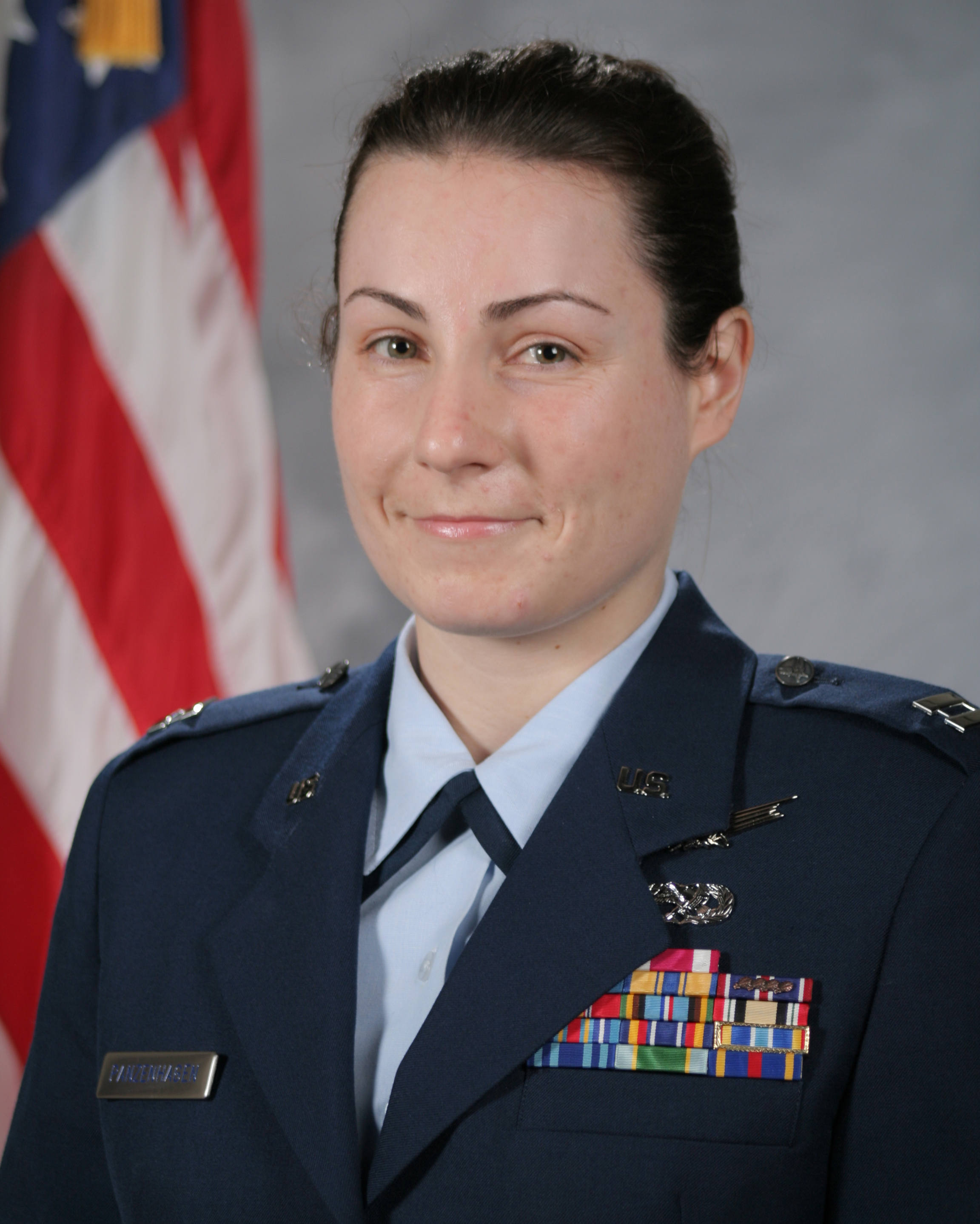
Panzenhagen as an Air Force captain

Panzenhagen was commissioned in the United States Air Force in June 2000 through the Detachment 220 Air Force Reserve Officer Training Corps at Purdue and recognized as a distinguished graduate. She started as a maintenance officer in the 1st Fighter Wing at Langley Air Force Base, Virginia, where she served as avionics fight commander, accessories flight commander, and section commander in the 1st Component Repair Squadron. In 2001, she was reassigned to the 71st Fighter Squadron, working as an assistant sortie generation flight commander. While there, she participated in the Weapons Instructor Course at Nellis Air Force Base, Nevada and the Weapons System Evaluation Program at Tyndall Air Force Base, Florida.

From December 2001 to March 2002, Panzenhagen deployed to Prince Sultan Air Base, Saudi Arabia in support of Operation Southern Watch. She then attended the Air Force Institute of Technology earning a master's degree in aeronautical engineering in 2004. After graduating from AFIT, she was assigned to the Air Vehicles Directorate of the Air Force Research Laboratory as an aerospace structure engineer. From 2004 to 2008, she was stationed at Cape Canaveral Air Force Station, Florida, first as a Titan launch operations engineer for the 3rd Space Launch Squadron, then as mission support flight commander for the 45th Launch Support Squadron, and finally as an executive officer for the 45th Launch Group.

From 2008 to 2011, Panzenhagen served as a chief of mission engineering. She served in this position first in a classified assignment and, after a year, she was assigned at Aerospace Data Facility-East. While there, she was one of 28 service members from the Air Force Space Command to compete for the Air Force 12 Outstanding Airmen of the Year competition. By 2019, she was serving as chief of the missile defense and missile warning systems branch in PEO Digital, Air Force Life Cycle Management Center. She then studied at the Marine Corps Command and Staff College from 2011 to 2012. After that, she served as the chief of advanced warfighting integration at the Air Force Rapid Capabilities Office until 2014.

Panzenhagen took command of the Foreign Materiel Exploitation Squadron at the National Air and Space Intelligence Center in June 2014 and relinquished command in August 2016. Following that command tour, she went back to studying at the Dwight D. Eisenhower School for National Security and Resource Strategy for a year. After which, she was reassigned to Hanscom Air Force Base, Massachusetts, as chief of missile defense and missile warning systems at the Air Force Life Cycle Management Center.

In 2019, Panzenhagen went back to the National Reconnaissance Office as chief of the strategy and integration group. In 2021, she transferred to the United States Space Force. From 2021 to 2022, she served as the senior material leader for the NRO's Integrated Ground Enterprise Directorate. In May 2022, she was nominated and confirmed for promotion to brigadier general. In June 2022, she started serving as the senior military assistant to Under Secretary of the Air Force Gina Ortiz Jones.

On June 30, 2023, Panzenhagen was frocked as brigadier general and took command of Space Launch Delta 45 and the Eastern Range from Major General Stephen G. Purdy.

== Awards and decorations ==
Middleton is the recipient of the following awards:

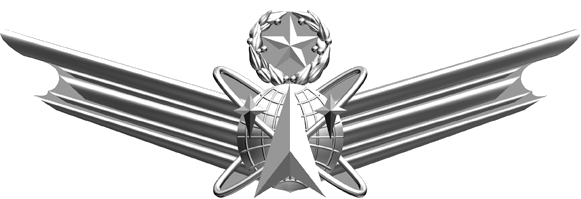
Command Space Operations Badge

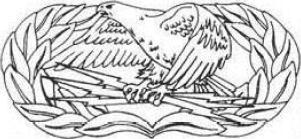

Radar, Airfield, and Weather Systems Badge

Air Staff Badge

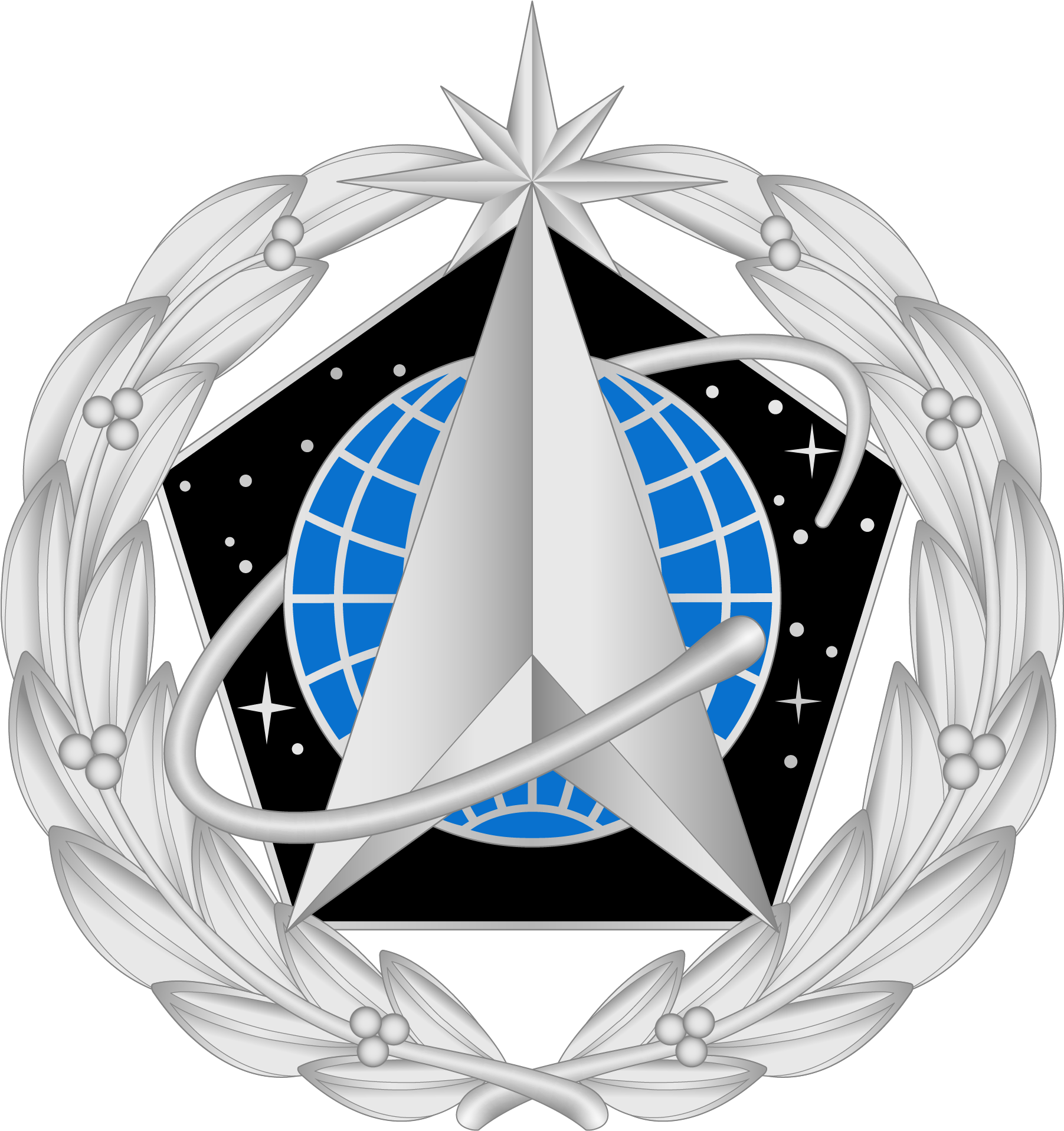

Space Staff Badge

| Defense Superior Service Medal |
| Legion of Merit |
| Defense Meritorious Service Medal with one oak leaf cluster |
| Meritorious Service Medal with two bronze oak leaf clusters |
| Joint Service Commendation Medal with one bronze oak leaf cluster |
| Air Force Commendation Medal |
| Joint Meritorious Unit Award |
| Air Force Outstanding Unit Award with four bronze oak leaf clusters |
| National Defense Service Medal |
| Armed Forces Expeditionary Medal |
| Iraq Campaign Medal with one bronze service star |
| Global War on Terrorism Expeditionary Medal |
| Global War on Terrorism Service Medal |
| Air and Space Campaign Medal |
| Air Force Expeditionary Service Ribbon with gold frame |
| Air Force Longevity Service Award with four bronze oak leaf clusters |
| Air Force Small Arms Expert Marksmanship Ribbon |
| Air Force Training Ribbon |

== Writings ==
- Space-to-Space Combat: The Potential for Future Warfare (Thesis). Marine Corps Command and Staff College. 2012.
- With Paul I. King, K. Colin Tucker, and Fred R. Schauer (2004). "Liquid Hydrocarbon Detonation Branching in a Pulse Detonation Engine" (PDF). Air Force Research Laboratory.
- Detonation Branching in a PDE with Liquid Hydrocarbon Fuel (PDF) (Thesis). Air Force Institute of Technology. 2012.

== Dates of promotion ==
| Rank | Branch | Date |
|---|---|---|
| Second lieutenant | Air Force | June 11, 2000 |
| First lieutenant | Air Force | June 11, 2002 |
| Captain | Air Force | June 11, 2004 |
| Major | Air Force | May 1, 2010 |
| Lieutenant colonel | Air Force | December 1, 2013 |
| Colonel | Air Force | May 1, 2018 |
| Colonel | Space Force | ~June 24, 2021 |
| Brigadier General | Space Force | December 16, 2023 |
| Major General | Space Force | July 30, 2026 |

Military offices
| Preceded by Erin Staine-Pyne | Senior Military Assistant to the Under Secretary of the Air Force; 2022–2023 | Succeeded by Brian Denaro |
| Preceded by Stephen G. Purdy | Program Executive Officer for Assured Access to Space and Director of Launch and Range Operations of Space Systems Command; 2023–2025 | Succeeded by Eric J. Zarybnisky |
| Preceded by Stephen G. Purdy | Commander of Space Launch Delta 45 and Director of the Eastern Range; 2023–2025 | Succeeded by Brian L. Chatman |
