= Air Force Institute of Technology =

U.S. military graduate school near Dayton, Ohio

Coordinates: 39.783°N 84.083°W

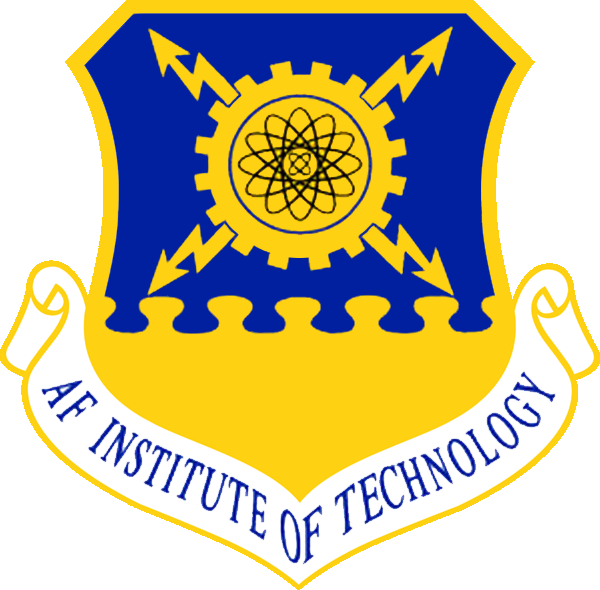
- Type: Graduate school
- Established: 1919
- Chancellor: Walter F. Jones
- Provost: Sivaguru S. Sritharan
- Location: Wright-Patterson AFB, Dayton, Ohio, U.S.
- Website: afit.edu

The Air Force Institute of Technology (AFIT) is a postgraduate institution and provider of professional and continuing education for the United States Armed Forces. It was founded in 1919 and is located at the Wright-Patterson Air Force Base, near Dayton, Ohio. AFIT is part of the United States Air Force's Air University and has been granting degrees since 1956. Its primary purpose is to provide specialized education to select officer and enlisted U.S. military personnel and civilian employees.

In 2012, AFIT appointed its first civilian director and chancellor, Todd Stewart, who served with the U.S. Air Force for 34 years and retired in 2002 at the rank of major general. In 2015, AFIT appointed Sivaguru S. Sritharan, the former Dean of Engineering and Applied Sciences at the Naval Postgraduate School, as provost.

== Academics ==
AFIT's four schools include:

- The Graduate School of Engineering and Management, which provides graduate programs leading to Master of Science and Doctor of Philosophy degrees in engineering, applied science, and management disciplines.
- The School of Systems and Logistics, which provides over 200 continuing education courses in acquisition management, logistics management, contracting, systems management, software engineering, and financial management.
- The Civil Engineer School, which provides continuing education courses in civil engineering en environmental studies. It also provides consultation in support of U.S. Air and Space Forces.
- The Strategic Force Studies, which provides continuing education courses in nuclear studies via the Department of Nuclear Studies (AFIT/EXA) at Kirtland Air Force Base and the Department of Nuclear Command, Control and Communications (NC3) Studies at Barksdale Air Force Base. It also provides continuing education courses in cyberspace studies via the Department of Cyberspace Studies (AFIT/EXC) at Wright-Patterson AFB.

AFIT has two Centers of Excellence and seven research centers funded by a number of federal agencies with interdisciplinary scope and international footprint representing a number of scientific areas for the United States Air Force and the Department of Defense:

- Air Force Cyberspace Technical Center of Excellence (CyTCoE)
- Scientific Test & Analysis Techniques Center of Excellence (STAT T&E)
- Autonomy & Navigation Technology Center (ANT)
- Center for Cyberspace Research (CCR)
- Center for Directed Energy (CDE)
- Center for Space Research & Assurance (CSRA)
- Center for Technical Intelligence Studies & Research (CTISR)
- Nuclear Expertise for Advancing Technologies Center (NEAT)
- Homeland Security Community of Best Practices (HS COBP)

== Graduate School of Engineering and Management ==
AFIT's Graduate School of Engineering and Management is the only element of AFIT which grants degrees. The Graduate School focuses on studies and research that are relevant to the United States Armed Forces, in particular the United States Air Force and United States Space Force. The school's Aeronautics & Astronautics Department has graduated nine U.S. astronauts including Guy Bluford (PhD 1978), the first African-American astronaut.

In the Carnegie Classification, AFIT's Graduate School is classified among "R2: Doctoral Universities – High research activity".

=== Students ===
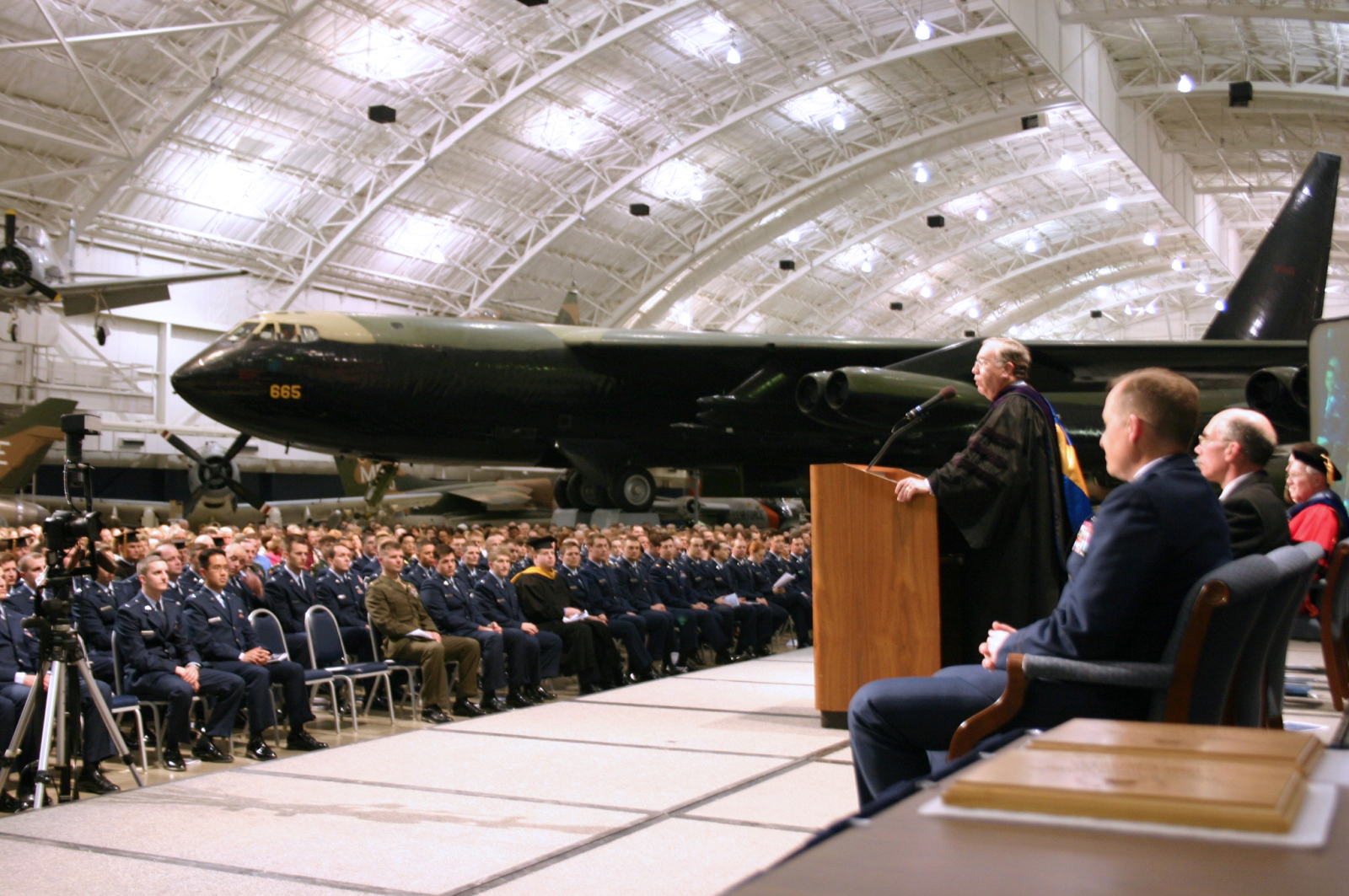
An AFIT graduation ceremony

The Air Force Institute of Technology (AFIT) enrolls over 650 full-time graduate students each year. The student body consists primarily of Air Force and Space Force officers, in addition to members of the other four U.S. Armed Services, select enlisted Airmen.

=== Accreditation ===
AFIT is accredited by the Higher Learning Commission of the North Central Association of Colleges and Schools to offer degrees at the doctorate level. Eight engineering programs in the Graduate School of Engineering and Management are accredited at the advanced level by the Accreditation Board for Engineering and Technology (ABET). The institution is a member of the Strategic Ohio Council for Higher Education (SOCHE).

== Notable alumni ==
- George W.S. Abbey – Former Director of the Johnson Space Center
- Captain Milburn G. Apt – The first pilot to achieve Mach 3
- Lieutenant General William J. Donahue, USAF, Ret.
- General Jimmy Doolittle – Doolittle Raider
- Lieutenant General Hans H. Driessnack, USAF, Ret.
- Russell Merle Genet – Pioneered the world's first fully robotic observatory
- General Robert T. Herres, USAF, Ret.
- Robert P. Johannes – One of the developers of the control configured vehicle (CCV) concept
- General George Kenney, USAF, Ret.
- Major General Louis G. Leiser, USAF, Ret.
- Donald S. Lopez Sr., USAF, Ret. – Deputy Director of the Smithsonian's National Air and Space Museum
- Lieutenant John A. Macready, USAF, Ret. – Test pilot
- Lieutenant General Forrest S. McCartney, USAF, Ret.
- General Bernard Schriever, USAF, Ret.
- General Lawrence Skantze, USAF, Ret.
- Major General Joseph K. Spiers, USAF, Ret.
- Lieutenant General James W. Stansberry, USAF, Ret.
- Lieutenant General William E. Thurman, USAF, Ret.
- Major General Jerry White (Navigators), USAF, Ret.
- Lt Col Archie Williams, USAF, Ret. – Gold medal winner of the 400 m sprint – 1936 Olympic Games in Berlin
- Michael Wynne – Former Secretary of the Air Force
- Steven M. Cron - retired Michelin engineer and co-inventor of the Tweel.

=== Notable military leaders ===
- Lieutenant General John D. Lamontagne, USAF
- Major General William T. "Bill" Cooley, USAF
- Brigadier General Jason E. Bartolomei, USAF
- Brigadier General Eric T. Fick, USAF
- Brigadier General Linda S. Hurry, USAF
- Brigadier General Carl E. Schaefer, USAF
- Brigadier General Donna D. Shipton, USAF
- Brigadier General Brad M. Sullivan, USAF
- Brigadier General (S) Kristin Panzenhagen, USAF
- Colonel Bree Fram, USAF, USSF

=== NASA astronauts ===
- Kevin A. Ford
- Michael E. Fossum
- William Anders
- Guion Bluford
- Mark N. Brown
- Gordon Cooper
- Albert H. Crews
- Donn F. Eisele
- John M. Fabian
- Gus Grissom
- James D. Halsell
- Steven Lindsey
- Richard Mullane
- Donald H. Peterson
- Major General Robert A. Rushworth, USAF, Ret.

=== Notable civilian senior leaders ===
- James F. Geurts

== Former names ==
- Air School of Application 1919–1920
- Air Service Engineering School 1920–1926
- Air Corps Engineering School 1926–1941
- Army Air Forces Engineering School 1944–1945
- Army Air Forces Institute of Technology 1945–1947
- Air Force Institute of Technology 1947–1948
- United States Air Force Institute of Technology 1948–1955
- Institute of Technology, USAF 1955–1956
- Air Force Institute of Technology 1956–1959
- Institute of Technology 1959–1962
- Air Force Institute of Technology 1962–present
