= 45th Launch Support Squadron =

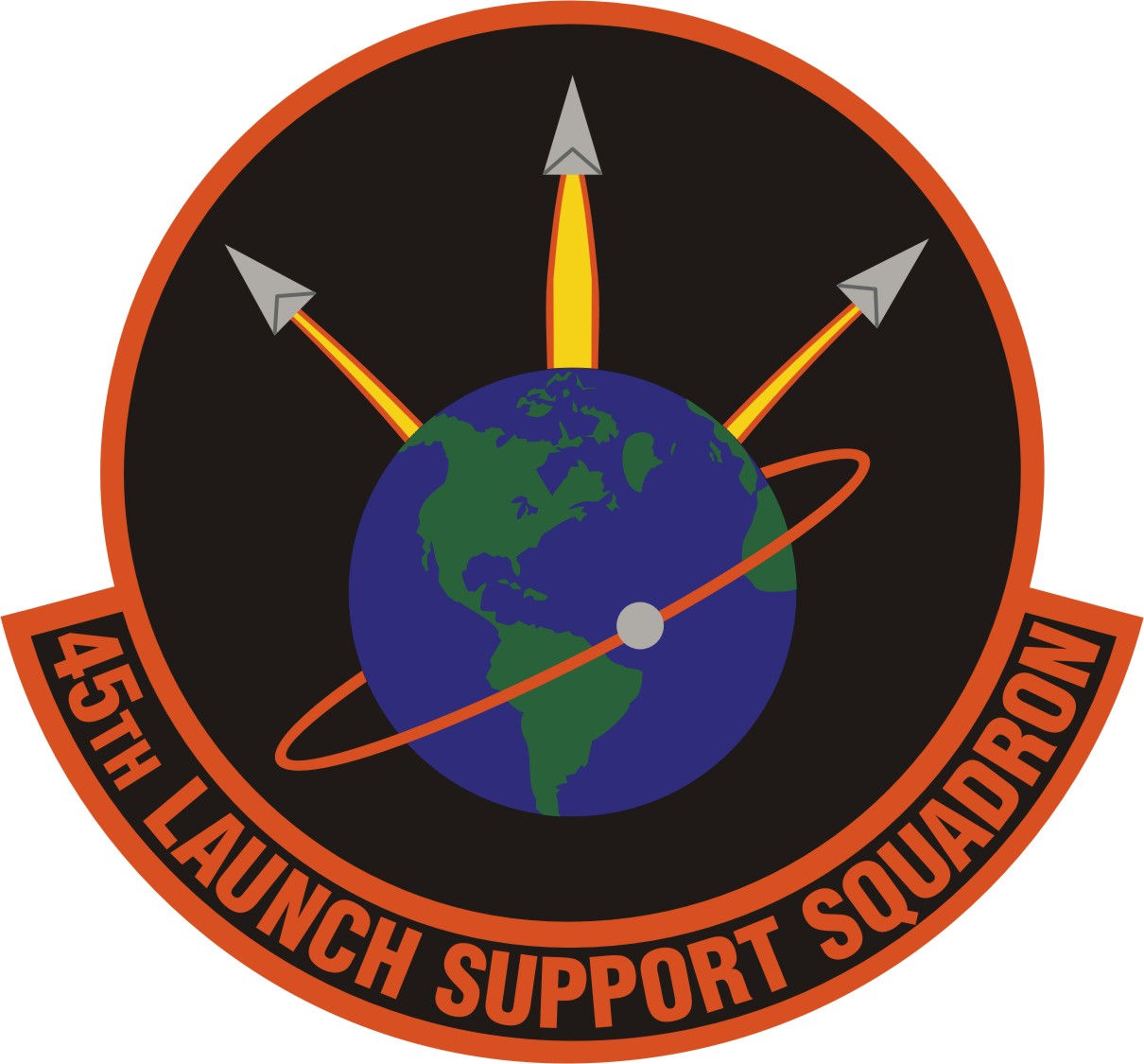
- 45th Launch Support Squadron Patch
- Active: 30 June 2005 – present
- Country: United States
- Branch: United States Air Force
- Type: Launch Support
- Role: Mission Assurance
- Part of: 45th Launch Group
- Garrison/HQ: Cape Canaveral Air Force Station, Florida
- Motto: Battlespace Dominance Through Satellite Integration

Commanders
- Current commander: Lt Col Kathryn Cantu

The 45th Launch Support Squadron(45 LCSS) is a United States Air Force unit stationed at Cape Canaveral Air Force Station, Florida. It is assigned to the 45th Launch Group along with its sister squadron the 5th Space Launch Squadron.

== Mission ==
The 45th Launch Support Squadron (LCSS) delivers a broad array of organic launch and launch support capabilities. In partnership with the satellite system directorates, the LCSS provides launch-base mission assurance for satellites by overseeing spacecraft hardware arrival, launch preparations, testing and launch. In addition, the squadron contains a program management office which ensures delivery of mission-critical facilities, launch support services such as training and ordnance management, and programmatic resources to Eastern Range customers. Finally, the LCSS provides a single interface for emerging DoD, civil, and commercial launch providers to access 45 SW services and successfully bring new launch capabilities to the United States.

== History ==
The 45th Launch Support Squadron was activated on 30 June 2005. The first mission with spacecraft processed by the 45 LCSS was the Micro-satellite Technology Experiment (MiTEx) which launched on 21 June 2006.

== Emblem ==
Description

On a disc Sable, arrayed to chief three deltas Silver Gray each with a contrail Or fimbriated Tenné issuing from behind a terrestrial globe Proper, environed by an orbit of the fourth charged with a sphere of the second, all within a narrow border Orange.

Attached below the disc, a Black scroll edged with a narrow Orange border and inscribed “45TH LAUNCH SUPPORT SQUADRON” in Orange letters.

Symbolism

Ultramarine blue and Air Force yellow are the Air Force colors. Blue alludes to the sky, the primary theater of Air Force operations. Yellow refers to the sun and the excellence required of Air Force personnel. The black background represents space. The three deltas signify the multiple launch vehicles the Squadron supports and the three Air Force Core Values: Integrity First, Service Before Self, and Excellence in All We Do. The earth and orbiting satellite describes the global nature of the unit’s mission.

== List of commanders ==
- Lt Col Scott Traxler
- Lt Col John Wagner
- Lt Col Erik Bowman
- Lt Col Gerard G. Gleckel Jr.
- Lt Col Paul P. Konyha III
- Lt Col Matthew E. Holston, July 2014 – July 2016
- Lt Col Kathryn Cantu, 15 August 2016 – present

== 45 LCSS Missions ==
=== List of LCSS Launches ===
No.	Launch Date	Mission	Vehicle	Notes
1	21 June 2006	MiTEx	Delta II	First mission with spacecraft processed by the 45th Launch Support Squadron.
2	25 September 2006	GPS IIR-15M	Delta II	
3	17 November 2006	GPS IIR-16	Delta II	
4	8 March 2007	STP-1	Atlas V	First launch of a USAF payload on an Atlas V.
5	10 October 2007	WGS-1	Atlas V	First of six WGS satellites
6	17 October 2007	GPS IIR-17	Delta II	
7	10 November 2007	DSP-23	Delta IV	Final launch of a DSP satellite and first operational launch of a Delta IV Heavy
8	20 December 2007	GPS IIR-18	Delta II	
9	15 March 2008	GPS IIR-19	Delta II	
10	24 March 2009	GPS IIR-20	Delta II	
11	4 April 2009	WGS-2	Atlas V	
12	17 August 2009	GPS IIR-21	Delta II	Final launch of a GPS IIR series satellite.
13	8 September 2009	PAN	Atlas V	
14	25 September 2009	STSS Demo	Delta II	
15	5 December 2009	WGS-3	Delta IV	Final Block 1 WGS satellite
16	2 April 2010	OTV-1	Atlas V	First launch of a reusable unmanned space vehicle.
17	28 May 2010	GPS IIF-1	Delta IV	First launch of IIF block of GPS satellites.
18	4 June 2010	Falcon 9 Flight 1	Falcon 9	First all commercial launch from CCAFS.
19	14 August 2010	AEHF-1	Atlas V	First launch of an AEHF military communication satellite.
20	8 December 2010	COTS Demo Flight 1	Falcon 9	First launch, orbit, and recovery of an operational Dragon capsule.
21	5 March 2011	OTV-2	Atlas V	
22	7 May 2011	SBIRS GEO-1	Atlas V	First launch of the next generation of missile warning satellites.
23	16 July 2011	GPS IIF-2	Delta IV	
24	19 January 2012	WGS-4	Delta IV	First launch of the upgrafed Block II satellites
25	24 February 2012	MUOS-1	Atlas V	First of a kind United States Navy UHF satellite.
26	4 May 2012	AEHF-2	Atlas V	
27	22 May 2012	COTS Demo Flight 2	Falcon 9	First commercial resupply of the International Space Station
28	30 August 2012	RBSP	Atlas V	
29	4 October 2012	GPS IIF-3	Delta IV	
30	7 October 2012	CRS-1	Falcon 9	
31	11 December 2012	OTV-3	Atlas V	
