= Timothy B. Rhyne =

Timothy B. Rhyne is a retired Michelin Research Fellow and co-inventor of the Tweel.

Rhyne received his BS and PhD degrees from North Carolina State University. He started at Michelin in 1978, originally in machine design, and moving to tire research and development in 1986.

He was an adjunct professor at Clemson University's ICAR (International Center for Automotive Research) where he taught tire mechanics.

In 2021, he and co-inventor Steven M. Cron were jointly awarded the Charles Goodyear Medal, the highest honor conferred by the American Chemical Society, Rubber Division. It was the first time that the award was given jointly.
