= 1st Space Launch Squadron =

1st Space Launch Squadron

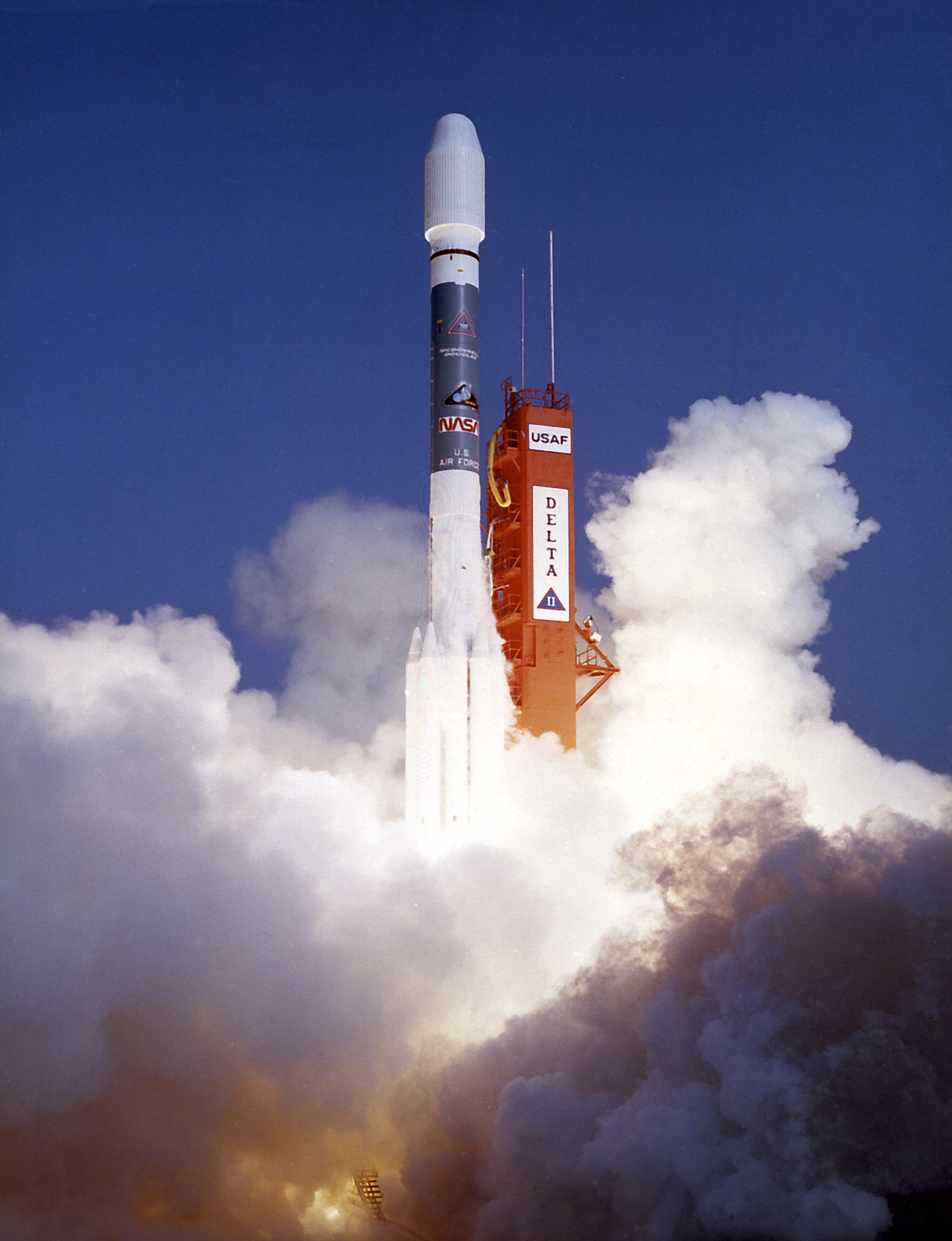
- A Delta II launch from Cape Canaveral AFS
- Active: 1990–2009
- Country: United States
- Branch: United States Air Force
- Type: Squadron
- Role: Space launch
- Part of: Air Force Space Command
- Decorations: Air Force Outstanding Unit Award

Insignia
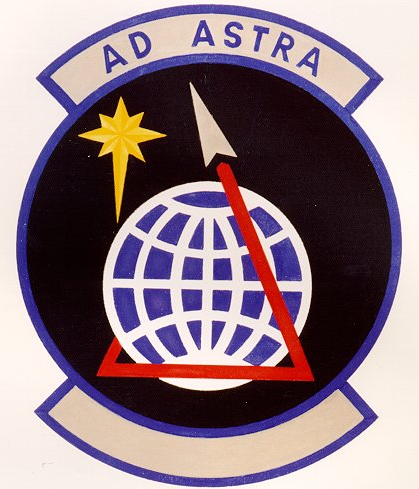
- 1st Space Launch Squadron emblem (approved 1 July 1992)

The United States Air Force's 1st Space Launch Squadron was a space launch unit located at Cape Canaveral Air Force Station, Florida. It was responsible for USAF Delta II launches from its activation in October 1990 to its inactivation in August 2009.

== History ==
Air Force launch operations were transferred from Air Force Systems Command to Air Force Space Command in the early 1990s. Phase I of the Launch Transfer Plan began on 1 October 1990, with the redesignation of the Eastern and Western Space and Missile Centers, as the 30th and 45th Space Wings.

The 1st Space Launch Squadron was activated on 1 October 1990, and became Air Force Space Command's first Delta II launch squadron. Its final launch of a Delta II was on 17 August 2009. Its final launch successfully placed the USA-206, or GPS IIR-21(M) navigation satellite into orbit. The squadron was inactivated on 30 September.

== Lineage ==
- Constituted as the 1st Space Launch Squadron on 11 September 1990

Activated on 1 October 1990
Inactivated on 30 September 2009

=== Assignments ===
- Eastern Space and Missile Center, 1 October 1990
- 45th Operations Group, 12 November 1991
- 45th Launch Group, 1 December 2003 – 30 September 2009

=== Stations ===
- Cape Canaveral Air Force Station, Florida, 1 October 1990 – 30 September 2009

=== Space Launch Vehicles ===
- Delta II, 1990–2009
