= Steven M. Cron =

Steven M. Cron is a retired Michelin product research engineer and co-inventor of the Tweel.

Cron began his engineering education with a BS Mechanical Engineering degree from the University of Missouri-Columbia in 1984. In 1985, he completed an MS degree in aeronautical engineering from the U. S. Air Force Institute of Technology at Wright-Patterson Air Force Base. He then continued with the Air Force for 6 years as a project engineer working on ICBMs and as an instructor of Engineering Mechanics at the US Air Force Academy. He began his career at Michelin in 1991 as a research engineer. He had initial assignments in the area of tire vibrations, specifically damped modal analysis of pneumatic tires via the finite element method.

He began work on airless tire technology as early as 1997, with work on the Tweel occurring over the period 2000-2009. Although other airless tire concepts have been studied or attempted in the past, none has achieved the commercial success of the Tweel, which is based on the framework and approach pioneered by Cron and co-inventor Timothy B. Rhyne.

In 2018, Cron received the Harold Herzlich Distinguished Technology award. At the time, Cron said that work on the Tweel began informally, starting with the idea that the load of the vehicle should be carried in the tire structure by means of tension, as happens in a traditional pneumatic tire. After realizing that cord tension carried via the sidewall would not work with zero inflation pressure, a successful experiment with polyurethane spokes lead to the basic Tweel design.

In 2021, Cron and co-inventor Timothy B. Rhyne were jointly awarded the Charles Goodyear Medal, the highest honor conferred by the American Chemical Society, Rubber Division. It was the first time that the award was given jointly.
