= Joseph K. Spiers =

United States Air Force general

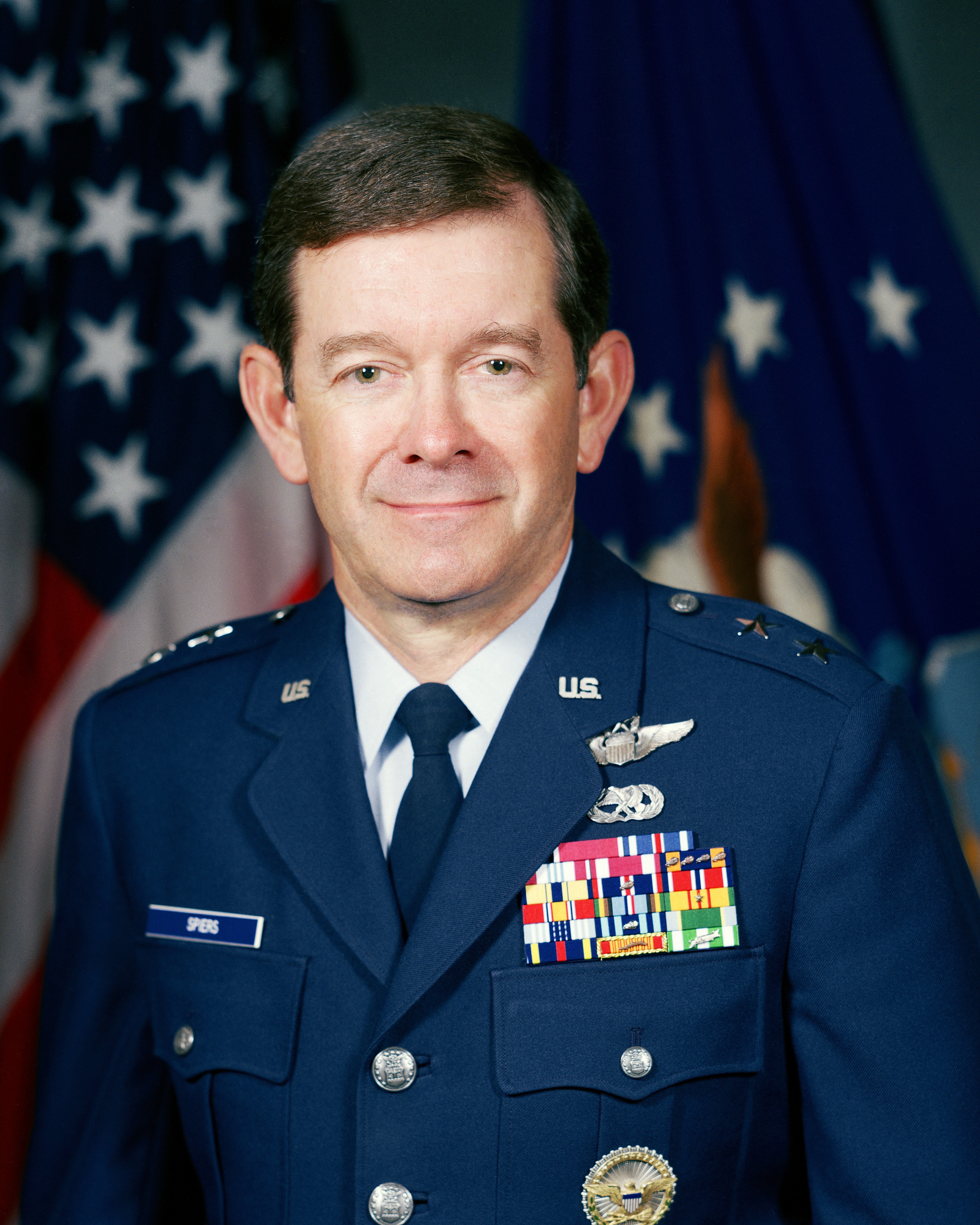
- Joseph K. Spiers
- Born: 1937 (age 88–89); Tarboro, North Carolina
- Military career
- Allegiance: United States of America
- Branch: United States Air Force
- Service years: 1959-1994
- Rank: Major General
- Conflicts: Vietnam War
- Awards: Legion of Merit; Distinguished Flying Cross

Joseph K. Spiers (born 1937) is an aerospace engineer and retired United States Air Force general, reaching the rank of major general during his military career.

Spiers was born in 1937, in Tarboro, North Carolina. He received a Bachelor of Science degree in mechanical engineering from North Carolina State University (where he was initiated into Phi Kappa Tau fraternity) and a Master of Science degree in aerospace engineering through the U.S. Air Force Institute of Technology program at Wright-Patterson Air Force Base in 1967. He completed Squadron Officer School in 1964, Air Command and Staff College in 1973, and the Air War College in 1976.

Upon graduation from college in 1959, he received his commission as a second lieutenant through the Air Force Reserve Officer Training Corps program. After completing pilot training at Moore Air Force Base, Texas, and Craig Air Force Base, Alabama, he served in the Air Training Command at Craig as an instructor pilot and academic instructor in T-33s and T-37s.

The general entered the U.S. Air Force Institute of Technology program at Wright-Patterson Air Force Base, Ohio, in September 1965. Upon graduation in July 1967 with a M.S. in aerospace engineering, he transferred to George Air Force Base, California, and upgraded to the F-4 Phantom. He served a year with the 559th Tactical Fighter Squadron in Vietnam and South Korea, flying 102 combat missions.

He returned to the United States in March 1969. For the next six years, he worked in the Air Force Systems Command at the Air Force Flight Test Center, Edwards Air Force Base, California. Assignments at Edwards included project engineer for F-4E category II testing; the U.S. Air Force Test Pilot School; research test pilot in the A-7, F-4, F-15, F-104 and U-2; deputy director, F-15 Joint Test Force; and maintenance control officer for the Flight Test Center.

General Spiers completed Air War College in June 1976 and for the next four years served with the Air Force Logistics Command, Ogden Air Logistics Center, Hill Air Force Base, Utah, as chief of the F-16 Acquisition Division (system manager). From June 1980 to June 1982 he served as a military staff assistant to the director of defense test and evaluation in the Office of the Secretary of Defense, Undersecretary of Defense for Research Engineering and Acquisition, Washington, D.C.

In July 1982 the general returned to Wright-Patterson Air Force Base as deputy for strategic missiles, space, electronic and armament programs, Air Force Acquisition Logistics Division. He became vice commander of the Air Force Acquisition Logistics Center in April 1983 and in August 1984 commanded the Logistics Operations Center. In July 1985 he became commander of the Air Force Acquisition Logistics Center. He was assigned as deputy chief of staff for logistics, Headquarters Pacific Air Forces, Hickam Air Force Base, Hawaii, in August 1986. General Spiers returned as commander of the Air Force Acquisition Logistics Center in May 1988. He became the commander of the Oklahoma City Air Material Area in September 1989, and retired from there on July 1, 1994. After retirement, he moved back to his family home in Tarboro, with plans to restore it.

The general is a command pilot with more than 3,400 flying hours. His military awards and decorations include the Legion of Merit, Distinguished Flying Cross, Defense Meritorious Service Medal, Meritorious Service Medal, Air Medal with four oak leaf clusters, Air Force Commendation Medal, Air Force Outstanding Unit Award with oak leaf cluster, Air Force Organizational Excellence Award, National Defense Service Medal, Armed Forces Expeditionary Medal, Vietnam Service Medal with five service stars, Air Force Overseas Ribbon-Short, Air Force Longevity Service Award Ribbon with five oak leaf clusters, Small Arms Expert Marksmanship Ribbon, Republic of Vietnam Gallantry Cross with Palm, and Republic of Vietnam Campaign Medal.

- Legion of Merit
- Distinguished Flying Cross
- Defense Meritorious Service Medal
- Meritorious Service Medal
- Air Medal with four oak leaf clusters
- Air Force Commendation Medal
- Air Force Outstanding Unit Award
- Air Force Organizational Excellence Award
- National Defense Service Medal
- Armed Forces Expeditionary Medal
- Vietnam Service Medal with five service stars
- Air Force Overseas Ribbon-Short
- Air Force Longevity Service Award Ribbon with five oak leaf clusters
- Small Arms Expert Marksmanship Ribbon
- Vietnam Gallantry Cross (with Palm)
- Republic of Vietnam Campaign Medal

He was promoted to major general July 1, 1988, with same date of rank.
