= William J. Donahue =

United States Air Force general

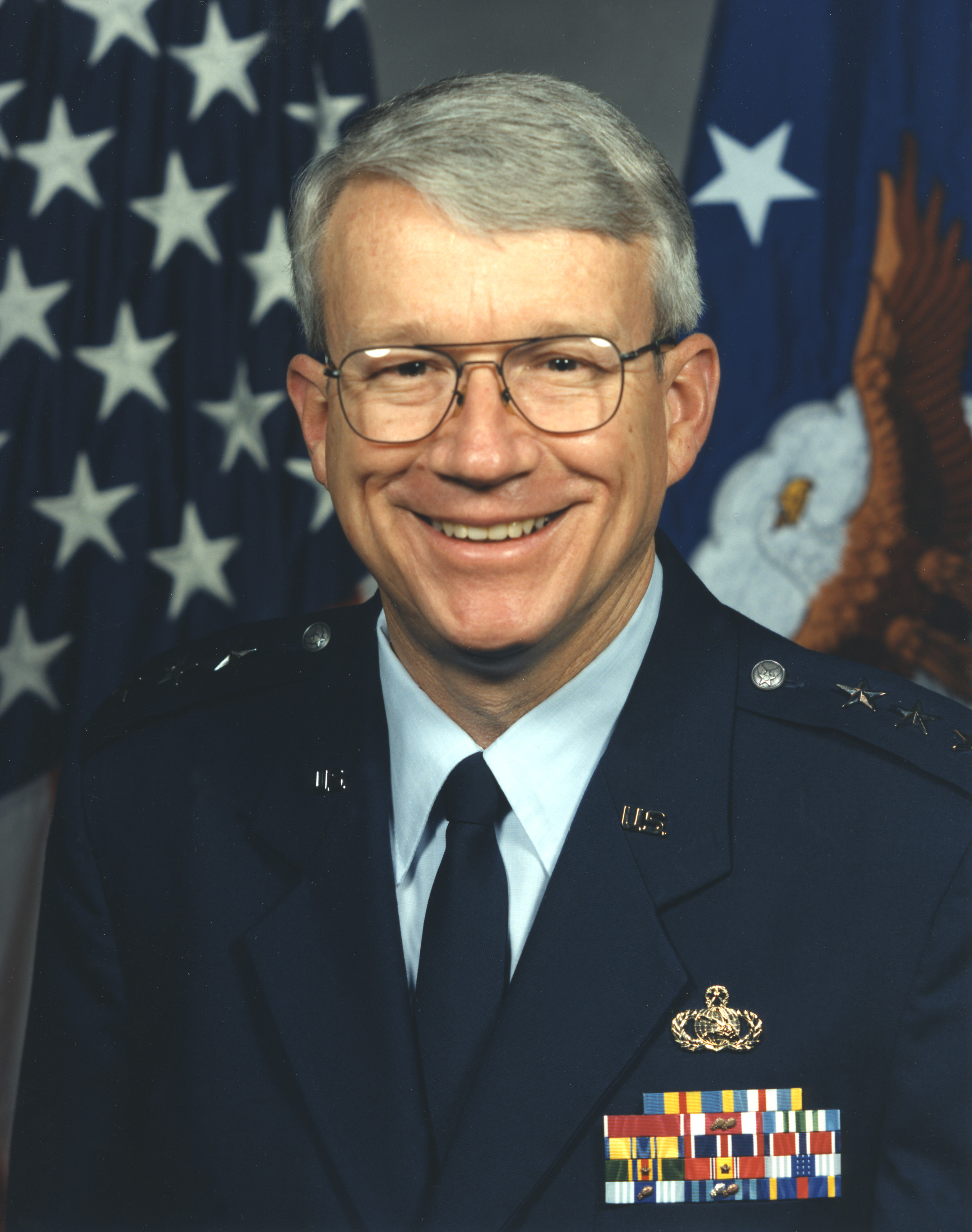
- Lieutenant General William J. "Bill" Donahue
- Military career
- Allegiance: United States of America
- Branch: United States Air Force
- Service years: 1966–2000
- Rank: Lieutenant general
- Nickname: Bill
- Commands: 1901st Communications Group; 1956th Communications Group
- Awards: Legion of Merit

William J. "Bill" Donahue is a retired lieutenant general for the United States Air Force who transformed networks and communications during his long career. He retired in May 2000 as the director of communications and information at Air Force Headquarters and commander of the Air Force Communications and Information Center in Washington, D.C. During his 33-year Air Force career, Donahue served in a variety of communications, information, command and control positions at virtually every level in the Air Force. During his active-duty career, Donahue led the Internet and information technology transformation in the Air Force.

Donahue has an undergraduate degree in mathematics and a master's degree in logistics management from the Air Force Institute of Technology. He is also a graduate of the National War College, the executive development program of the University of California, Berkeley, and the national security program of Harvard's John F. Kennedy School of Government. Since retirement from the Air Force, Donahue has worked in the government information technology industry.

He is executive vice president, federal solutions for Sytel and is a member of several corporate and advisory boards for leading information technology companies. From 2000 to 2003 Donahue was vice president and general manager for CSC's aerospace business unit, where he had operational responsibility for the delivery of information technology solutions, support services, and space systems solutions to the Air Force. He currently is involved in promoting and advocating for diabetes research.

== Air Force biography ==
Lt. Gen. Donahue was director, communications and information, Headquarters U.S. Air Force, and commander, Air Force Communications and Information Center, Washington, D.C. He was responsible for strategic plans, doctrine, policies, architecture and standards for communications and information systems in the Air Force. He was the functional manager for more than 75,000 communications and information professionals in the Air Force. He was responsible for three field operating agencies: the Air Force Communications Agency, the Air Force Pentagon Communications Agency and the Air Force Frequency Management Agency.

The general entered active duty in September 1966 and was commissioned in November 1966 through Officer Training School. He has commanded two communications groups and has served as the chief communications-computer officer for the Iceland Defense Force, two numbered air forces and two major commands.

== Education ==
- 1966 Bachelor of Arts degree in mathematics, Bellarmine College, Kentucky
- 1972 Master of Science degree in logistics management, Air Force Institute of Technology
- 1973 Squadron Officer School, Maxwell Air Force Base, Alabama
- 1985 National War College, Fort Lesley J. McNair, Washington, D.C.
- 1990 University of California's Executive Development Course

== Assignments ==
- September 1966 – November 1966, student, Officer Training School, Lackland Air Force Base, Texas
- December 1966 – October 1967, student, basic communications-electronics course, Keesler Air Force Base, Mississippi
- October 1967 – January 1971, communications operations officer, 2135th Communications Squadron, Ramstein Air Base, West Germany
- January 1971 – February 1972, student, Wright-Patterson Air Force Base, Ohio
- February 1972 – April 1973, instructor, basic communications-electronics officer course, Keesler Air Force Base, Mississippi
- April 1973 – April 1975, chief, Electronic Principles Branch, School of Applied Aerospace Science, Keesler Air Force Base, Mississippi
- December 1975 – November 1979, logistics plans officer, Headquarters Air Force Communications Service, Richards-Gebaur Air Force Base, Missouri
- November 1979 – October 1980, assistant chief of staff, Headquarters Air Force Communications Command, Scott Air Force Base, Illinois
- October 1980 – September 1981, assistant chief of staff, communications-electronics, Iceland Defense Force, Keflavik Naval Air Station, Iceland
- September 1981 – December 1982, executive officer, Headquarters Air Force Communications Command, Scott Air Force Base, Illinois
- December 1982 – June 1984, commander, 1901st Communications Group, Travis Air Force Base, California
- June 1984 – July 1985, student, National War College, Fort Lesley J. McNair, Washington, D.C.
- July 1985 – July 1987, commander, 1956th Communications Group, and deputy chief of staff for communications-computer systems, Headquarters 5th Air Force, Yokota Air Base, Japan
- July 1987 – May 1989, deputy program manager, then program manager, Worldwide Military Command and Control System Information Systems Joint Program Management Office, McLean, Virginia
- May 1989 – August 1991, assistant to the deputy chief of staff for command, control, communications and computers, Headquarters U.S. Air Force, Washington, D.C.
- August 1991 – June 1992, deputy chief of staff for communications-computer systems, Headquarters Tactical Air Command, Langley Air Force Base, Virginia
- June 1992 – August 1994, director, communications-computer systems, Headquarters Air Combat Command, Langley Air Force Base, Virginia
- August 1994 – December 1996, director, command control systems for NORAD; director, command control systems for U.S. Space Command; and director, communications-computer systems for Air Force Space Command, Peterson Air Force Base, Colorado
- December 1996 – March 1997 deputy chief of staff for communications and information, Headquarters U.S. Air Force, Washington, D.C.
- April 1997 – May 2000, director, communications and information, Headquarters U.S. Air Force, and commander, Air Force Communications and Information Center, Washington, D.C.

== Major awards and decorations ==
- Defense Distinguished Service Medal
- Defense Superior Service Medal
- Legion of Merit
- Meritorious Service Medal with two oak leaf clusters
- Joint Service Commendation Medal
- Air Force Commendation Medal

== Effective dates of promotion ==
- Second lieutenant November 24, 1966
- First lieutenant May 25, 1968
- Captain November 29, 1969
- Major May 1, 1977
- Lieutenant colonel October 1, 1980
- Colonel November 1, 1984
- Brigadier general July 2, 1992
- Major general September 28, 1994
- Lieutenant general January 1, 1997
