= 45th Operations Group =

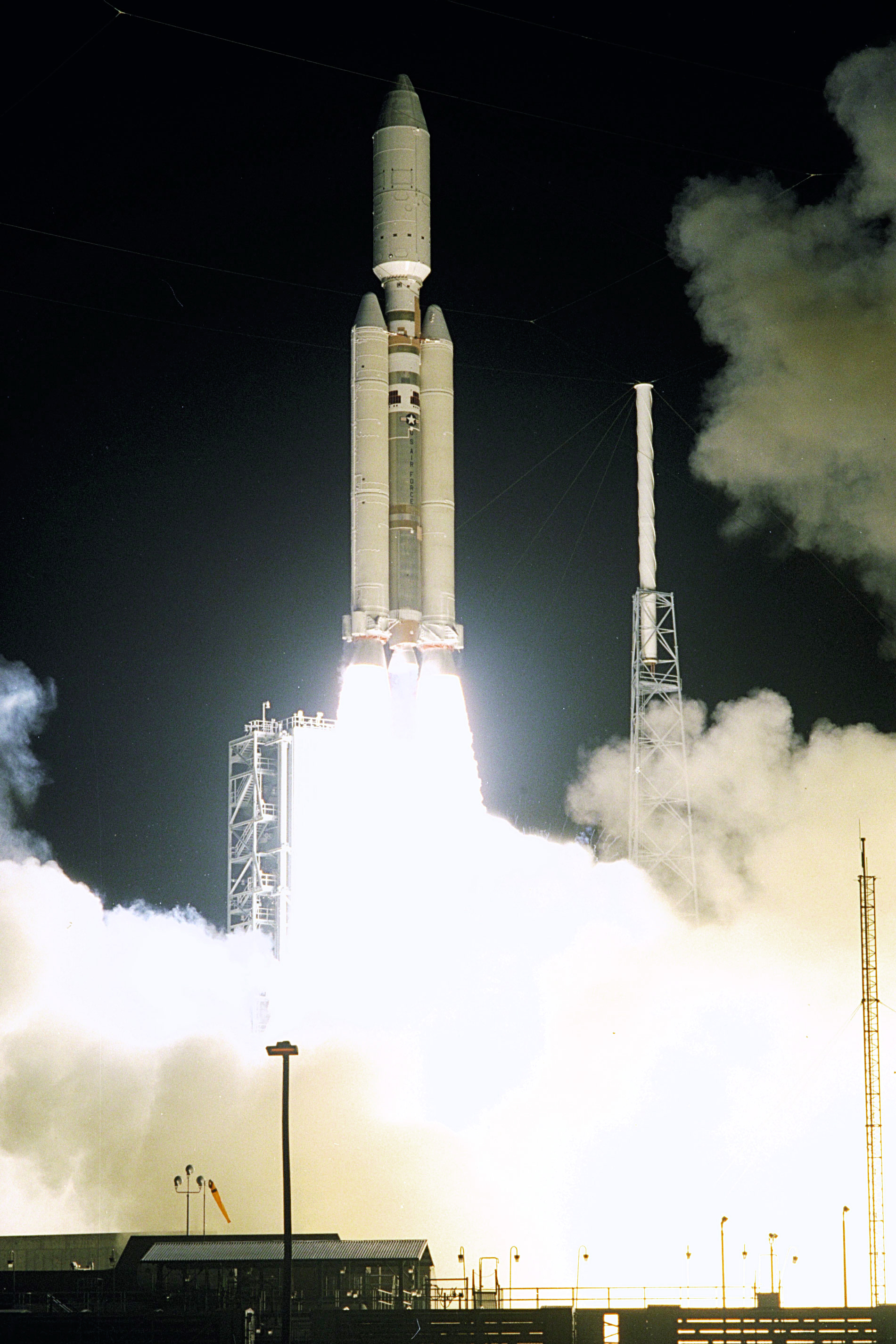
- Cassini–Huygens spacecraft launch, 15 October 1997
- Active: 1941–1942, 1991–2021
- Country: United States
- Branch: United States Air Force
- Type: Group
- Role: Space launch
- Motto: Ad Astra (Latin for 'To the Stars')

Insignia
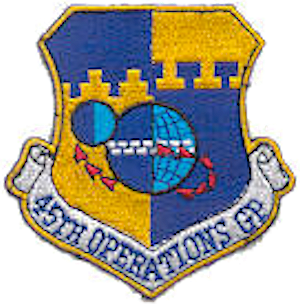
- Patch with 45th Operations Group emblem (Approved 19 July 1967 for Air Force Eastern Test Range) (Note: Based on the emblem for the 45th Space Wing. The group uses the wing emblem with the group designation on the scroll. Robertson, Factsheet 45 Space Wing (AFSPC).)

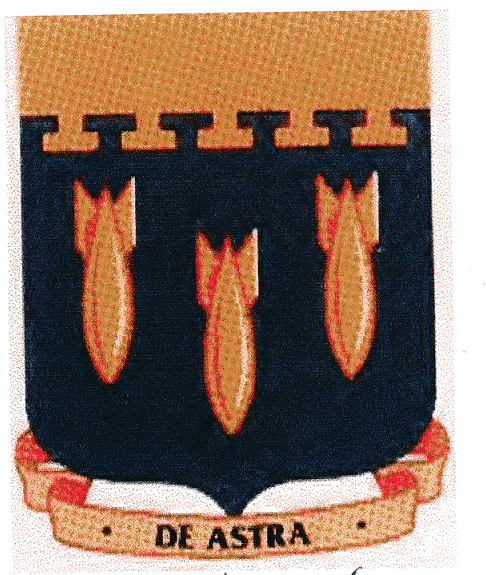
- 45th Bombardment Group emblem (Note: Approved 6 January 1942. Description: : Azure, three aerial bombs or, a chief potentee of the last.)

The 45th Operations Group was a United States Air Force unit. It was assigned to 45th Space Wing, stationed at Cape Canaveral Air Force Station, Florida. In May 2021, it was inactivated and its assetts reassigned to Space Launch Delta 45.

Up until 2003, the 45th Operations Group was responsible for program management and operation of up to five squadrons which perform all Eastern Range launch operations including Delta II, Delta III, Atlas II, Atlas III, Titan IV, Space Shuttle, Pegasus, and Athena space launch vehicles.

The group provided support to Naval Ordnance Test Unit operations. In support of space launch operations, it coordinated training for the wing, manages all wing spacecraft services systems and facilities, and manages the Cape Canaveral Space Force Station Skid Strip and the Patrick Air Force Base air traffic control complex, handling more than 24,000 aircraft operations annually.

== Components ==
- 1st Range Operations Squadron. The 1st Range Operations Squadron provides range operations, operations support management, and scheduling services to National Aeronautics and Space Administration, the United States Space Force, United States Navy, and other Department of Defense partners.
- 45th Operations Support Squadron. The 45th Operations Support Squadron assures access to space to fulfill war-fighting, CINC and national requirements by providing policy decisions, training, and airfield operations for the 45th Operations Group, while managing all airfield and air traffic control services for the 45th Space Wing. Its Launch Operations Support Flight Provides behind-the-scenes support for all launches. It helps coordinate tours and launch viewing for distinguished visitors and coordinating launch critical briefings and conferences. Its Airfield Operations Flight manages the Patrick airfield and provides air traffic control services in support of the space range and the National Airspace System. Its Current Operations Flight coordinates and implements wing-level policies and procedures which provide the structure for launch operations. Its Spacelift Operations Training Flight provides wing training policy and guidance for more than 100 space launch operators.
- 45th Range Management Squadron. The 45th Range Management Squadron provides operations and maintenance services for all range instrumentation and critical launch facilities and quality assurance support to wing and delegated contractual efforts
- 45th Space Communications Squadron
- 45th Weather Squadron
- Detachment 1, Antigua Air Station, West Indies. This detachment was discontinued on 7 July 2015. It provided telemetry and radar tracking data to support space launches out of the Eastern Range. When not supporting space launches, it provided radar tracking data for locating and cataloging space objects in support of U.S. Space Command's Space Surveillance Network. Operated as part of the space tracking mission for approximately 50 years, and required over US$10 million per year operational cost in it later years.
- Detachment 2, Ascension Auxiliary Air Field. This detachment provides telemetry and radar tracking data to support space launches out of the Eastern Range. When not supporting its primary mission, the unit has the secondary mission of providing radar tracking data for locating and cataloging space objects in support of the United States Space Command Space Surveillance Network.
- Detachment 3, Patrick Space Force Base. This detachment, also known as the Guardian Angels, coordinates DOD contingency support for United States human space flight programs. Its roots go back to the 1959 charter by the Secretary of Defense as the DOD Mercury Support Office. Later renamed DOD Manned Space Flight Support Office. Since its inception the office has continued to be the principle facilitator for all DOD contingency support to Projects Mercury, Gemini, and Apollo; the Apollo–Soyuz Test Project; the Space Shuttle Program, the International Space Station/Soyuz Program; the Orion Program; and the presidential commercial space initiative.

== History ==
=== World War II ===
The group was organized at Army Air Base, Savannah, Georgia in January 1941 as the 45th Bombardment Group and equipped with Douglas A-20 Havocs (along with a few DB-7s, an export version of the A-20). (Note: The United States impounded 356 DB-7s ordered for France or Great Britain Baugher, Joseph (27 October 2001). "Douglas DB-73". Joe Baugher.) Its original assigned squadrons were the 78th, 79th and 80th Bombardment Squadrons. The 17th Reconnaissance Squadron was attached to the group. In June the group moved to Army Air Base, Manchester, New Hampshire, where the 17th Reconnaissance Squadron was assigned to the group as the 92d Bombardment Squadron.

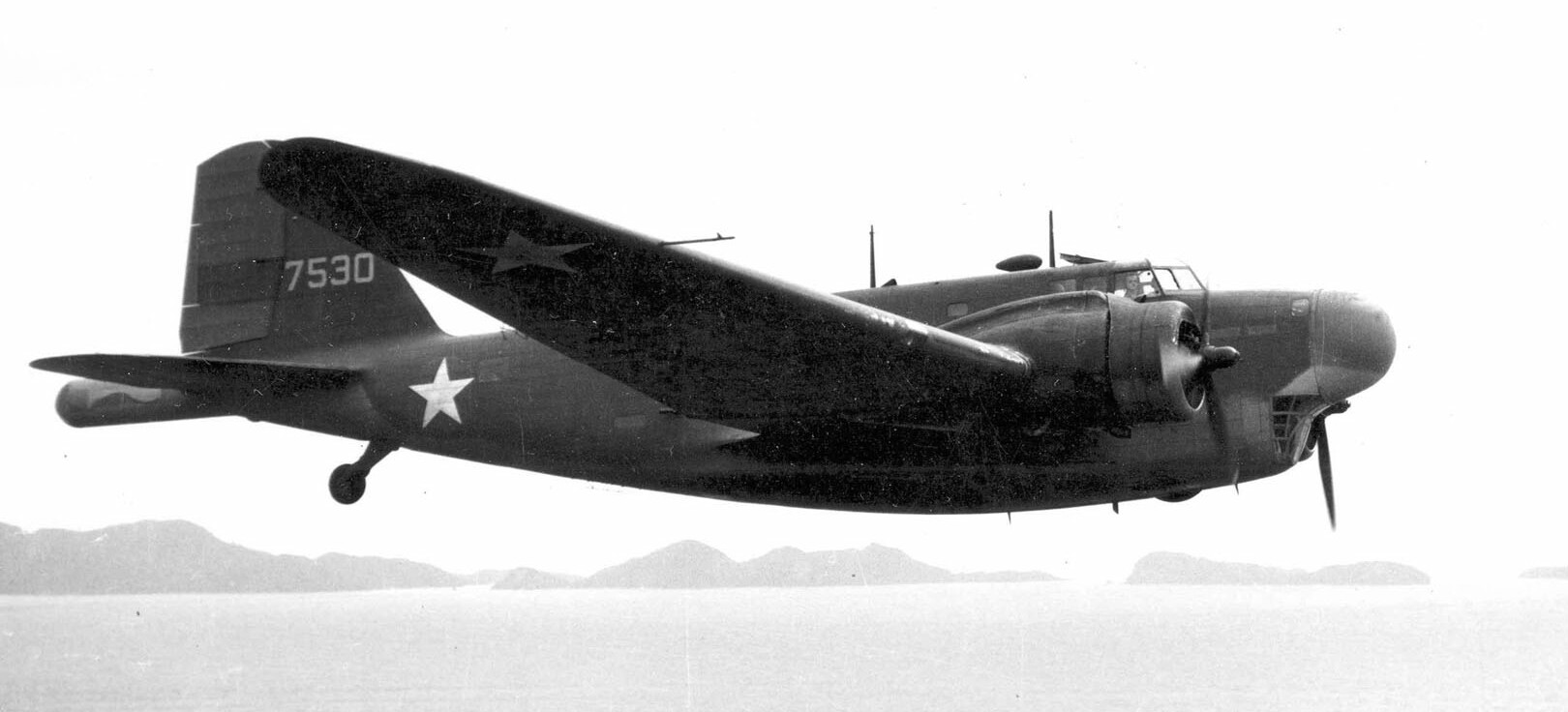
Douglas B-18B equipped for antisubmarine warfare

Following the attack on Pearl Harbor the squadron began flying antisubmarine patrols off the Atlantic coast. In 1942, it converted to various medium bombers, primarily the Douglas B-18 Bolo, which was equipped with radar for the antisubmarine mission. The group moved to Dover Army Air Field, Delaware in May 1942 and to Miami Army Air Field, Florida in August. Its squadrons were dispersed to various bases along the Atlantic and Gulf coasts

In October 1942, the Army Air Forces organized its antisubmarine forces into the single Army Air Forces Antisubmarine Command, which established the 26th Antisubmarine Wing the following month to control its forces operating over the Gulf of Mexico and the Caribbean Sea. The command's bombardment group headquarters, including the 45th, were inactivated and the squadrons, now designated the 7th, 8th, 9th and 10th Antisubmarine Squadrons, were assigned directly to the 26th Wing.

=== Space operations ===
Reactivated as the 45th Operations Group in November 1991 under Air Force Space Command. Operated "Down-Range" facilities at Antigua, Ascension Island, and Cape Canaveral, Florida; launched DOD payloads into orbit; and collected flight data for evaluation of ballistic missile systems launched from Eastern Launch sites for DOD, NASA, and commercial customers. Provided support for DOD, NASA, and commercial manned and unmanned space programs.

There were several organizational changes in the wing in 1997 and 1998. Detachments 1 and 2 of the 45th Operations Group were inactivated on Antigua and Ascension on 1 June 1997, but they were replaced by Detachments 1 and 2 of the 45th Logistics Group on the same day. The 5th Space Launch Squadron was inactivated at Cape Canaveral Air Station on 29 June 1998, and its resources were absorbed by the 3rd Space Launch Squadron.

Launch operations were reassigned to the 45th Launch Group on 1 December 2003. The group was inactivated on 4 May 2021 and its mission, personnel and equipment were transferred to Space Launch Delta 45 of the United States Space Force.

== Lineage ==
- Constituted as the 45th Bombardment Group (Light) on 20 September 1940

Activated on 15 January 1941
Redesignated 45th Bombardment Group (Medium) in December 1941
Inactivated on 8 December 1942

- Redesignated 45th Operations Group on 1 November 1991

Activated on 12 November 1991
Inactivated on 4 May 2021

=== Assignments ===
- 16th Bombardment Wing, 15 January 1941
- 1st Air Support Command, 21 August 1941
- I Bomber Command, 5 January 1942
- Army Air Forces Antisubmarine Command, 13 October 1942
- 26th Antisubmarine Wing, 20 November–8 December 1942
- 45th Space Wing, 12 November 1991 – 4 May 2021

=== Squadrons ===
World War II

- 17th Reconnaissance Squadron (later 92d Bombardment Squadron, 92d Reconnaissance Squadron, 433d Bombardment Squadron): (Attached 15 January 1941, assigned 14 August 1941 – 21 November 1942)
- 76th Bombardment Squadron: (Air echelon attached c. 21 May – 13 August 1942)
- 78th Bombardment Squadron (later 7th Antisubmarine Squadron): 15 January 1941 – 7 December 1942
- 79th Bombardment Squadron: 15 January 1941 – 21 November 1942
- 80th Bombardment Squadron (later 9th Antisubmarine Squadron): 15 January 1941 – 7 December 1942

Since 1991

- 1st Range Operations Squadron: 1 December 2003 – 4 May 2021
- 1st Space Launch Squadron: 12 November 1991 – 1 December 2003
- 3d Space Launch Squadron: 1 April 1992 – 1 December 2003
- 5th Space Launch Squadron: 14 April 1994 – 29 June 1998
- 45th Operations Support Squadron: 12 November 1991 – 4 May 2021
- 45th Range Squadron: 12 November 1991 – 1 December 2003
- 45th Range Management Squadron: 1 October 2002 – 4 May 2021
- 45th Space Communications Squadron: 1 December 2003 – 4 May 2021
- 45th Weather Squadron: 12 November 1991 – 4 May 2021

=== Stations ===
- Army Air Base, Savannah Army Air Base, Georgia, 15 January 1941
- Army Air Base, Manchester (later Grenier Field), New Hampshire, 18 June 1941
- Dover Army Air Field, Delaware, 16 May 1942
- Miami Army Air Field, Florida, 1 August – 8 December 1942
- Patrick Space Force Base, Florida, 12 November 1991
- Cape Canaveral Space Force Station, Florida, 1 November 1998 – 4 May 2021

== List of commanders ==
- Lt Col James E. Duke Jr., January 1941
- Lt Col George A. McHenry, 1 April 1941
- Lt Col Charles W. Haas, c. September – 8 December 1942
- Col James N. Posey, 12 November 1991
- Col Michael R. Spence, 31 January 1992
- Col Glenn C. Waltman, 20 August 1993
- Col Gary R. Harmon, 28 April 1995
- Col Philip G. Benjamin II, 9 June 1997
- Col Darphaus L. Mitchell, 24 May 1999
- Col Cameron S. Bowser, 11 June 2001
- Col Gregory M. Billman, 7 March 2003
- Col David D. Thompson, 29 June 2005
- Col Bernard J. Gruber, 12 July 2007
- Col James Ross, 21 May 2009
- Col Denette Sleeth, 14 January 2011
- Col Douglas A. Schiess, 30 July 2012
- Col Rob Quigg (acting), 9 April 2014
- Col Thomas Falzarano, 10 July 2014
- Col Burton Catledge, 11 July 2016
- Col Steve Lang, 31 Jul 2018
- Col Mark Shoemaker, 11 July 2019 – 3 May 2021>
