= Leiser Madanes =

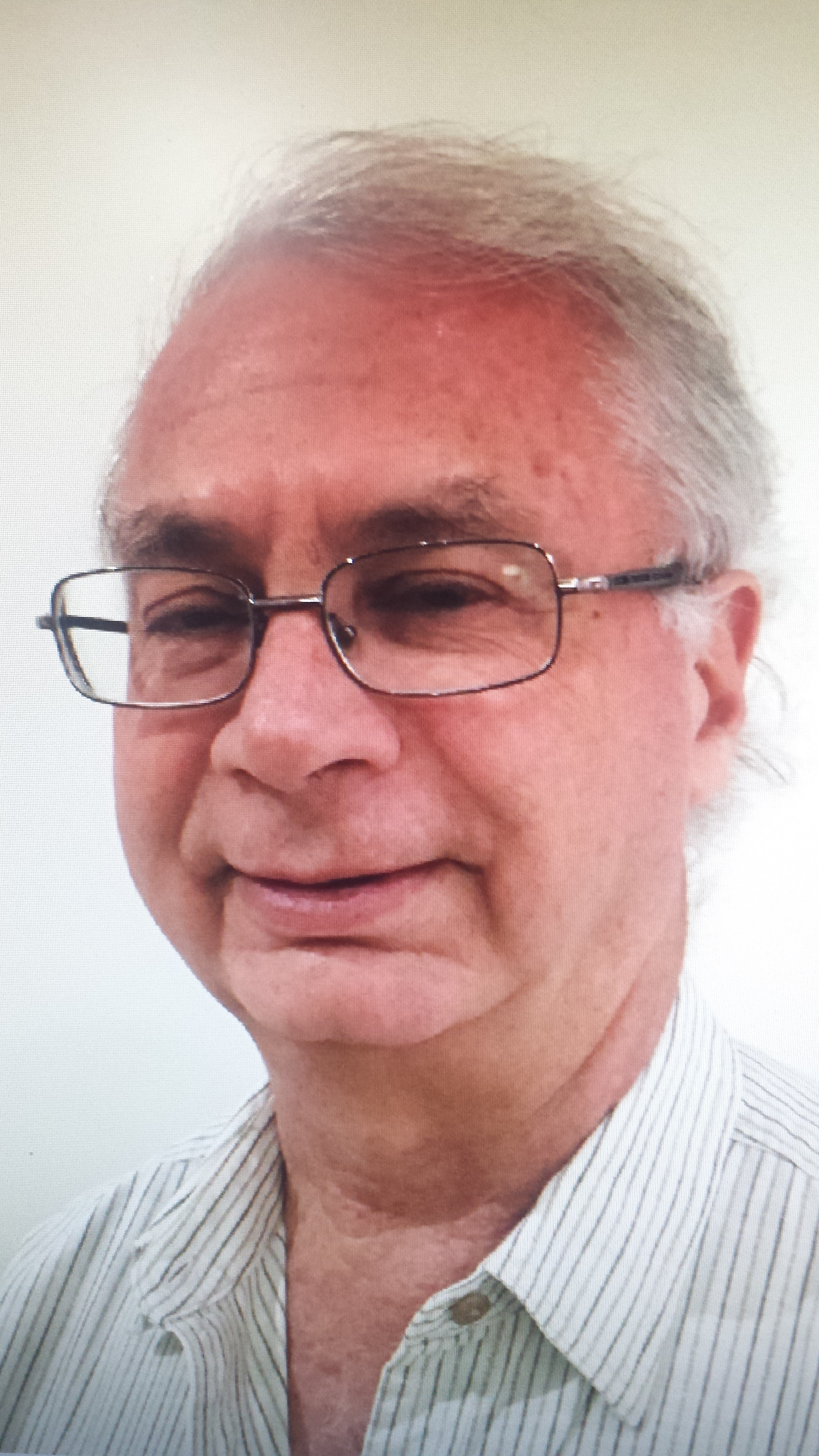
Leiser Madanes at UDESA

Leiser Madanes (1950) is a writer, philosopher and Argentine professor. Throughout his career he has published several books, as the main focus the study of modern philosophy as Hobbes and Spinoza, freedom of expression and the state's relationship with the freedoms of men. Its main areas of study are modern philosophy and political philosophy.

Among his major works are a secret joy: Essays in Modern Philosophy (Ensayo de filosofía moderna) (2012) and The arbitrary referee (El árbitro arbitrario), Hobbes, Spinoza and freedom of expression (Hobbes, Spinoza y la libertad de expresión) (2001). He is the author of numerous articles and book chapters.

Doctor of Philosophy at the University of Buenos Aires, Leiser Madanes is Professor of Political Philosophy, Faculty of Humanities and Education Sciences (UNLP) and Principal Investigator of the Center for Philosophical Research.

Previously, he was Professor at the UDESA, National University of Tucuman, a member of the career of scientific researcher, CONICET and Director of the Department of Philosophy, Faculty of Arts, Member of the Doctoral Committee, National University of La Plata and Member of Board, Universidad Torcuato Di Tella and research policies Consultant, National University of Quilmes.
