= Louis G. Leiser =

United States Air Force general

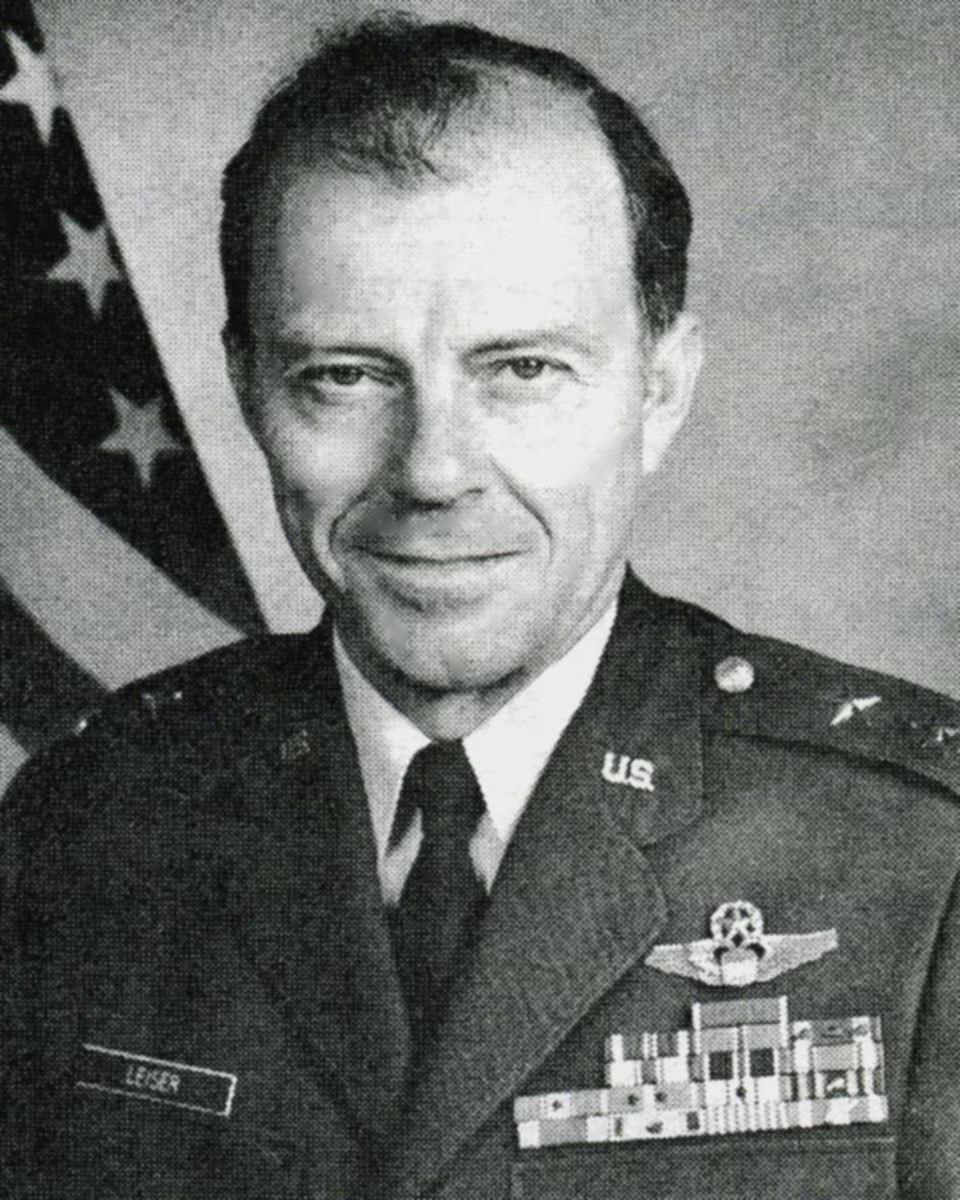
- MAJOR GENERAL LOUIS G. LEISER
- Born: November 6, 1927; Portland, Oregon, U.S.
- Died: October 17, 2009 (aged 81); Fairfax, Virginia, U.S.
- Military career
- Allegiance: United States of America
- Branch: United States Air Force
- Service years: 1945 – 1980
- Rank: Major General
- Awards: Legions of Merit (2); Distinguished Flying Cross; Bronze Star Medal; Air Medals (4)

Louis G Leiser (November 6, 1927 – October 17, 2009) was a major general in the United States Air Force.

== Biography ==
=== Youth ===
General Leiser was born in Portland, Oregon, in 1927. He was raised in Twin Falls, Idaho, where he graduated from high school in 1945. He enlisted in the U.S. Army in May 1945 and entered the United States Military Academy at West Point, New York, in July 1946.

=== Military career ===
He graduated from the academy in June 1950 with a commission as a second lieutenant and a bachelor of science degree. In December 1951, after completion of pilot training at Williams Air Force Base, Arizona, and gunnery training at Nellis Air Force Base, Nevada, General Leiser was assigned to the 44th Fighter-Bomber Squadron at Clark Air Base in the Philippines. In February 1952 he went to Korea to serve as a pilot and flight commander with the 35th Fighter-Bomber Squadron, 8th Fighter-Bomber Wing, at Suwon, and flew 100 combat missions in the F-80.

He returned to the United States in August 1952 to serve as F-94 and F-89 pilot and assistant operations officer with the 74th Fighter-Interceptor Squadron at Presque Isle Air Force Base, Maine. General Leiser was maintenance officer for that unit when the squadron went to Thule Air Base, Greenland, in August 1954, the first F-89 unit to deploy from the United States.

His next assignment was in October 1955 as a flight commander with the 460th Fighter-Interceptor Squadron at Portland International Airport in Oregon. During this four-year tour of duty, he flew both the F-89 and F-102 aircraft and attained the Air Defense Command Skill Rating of Expert.

In September 1959, General Leiser was selected for an Air Force Institute of Technology graduate program at Wright-Patterson Air Force Base, Ohio. Two years later he graduated with a Master of Science degree in astronautical engineering.

He was assigned in August 1961 to the U.S. Air Force Academy at Colorado Springs, Colorado, as an instructor with the Department of Mechanics, and later served as assistant professor and associate professor with the Department of Astronautics. He also established the course of instruction adopted as the general engineering major.

General Leiser completed F-100 transition and combat crew training at Luke Air Force Base, Arizona, in December 1966, and was transferred to the Republic of Vietnam. He served as executive officer, Current Plans Division, Directorate of Combat Operations, at Seventh Air Force Headquarters, Tan Son Nhut Air Base, Saigon.

He returned to the United States in December 1967 and was assigned to Headquarters Air Force Systems Command at Andrews Air Force Base, Maryland, in the Strategic Analysis Division, Office of the Deputy Chief of Staff for Development Plans, as lead staff analyst for the B-1 Bomber Defense Missile and Subsonic Cruise Armed Decoy. He attended the Naval War College at Newport, Rhode Island, from August 1969 to July 1970.

He then was assigned to North American Air Defense Command at Ent Air Force Base, Colorado, where he was command director for the deputy chief of staff for combat operations.

In March 1972, General Leiser was named commander, 23d Air Division, Aerospace Defense Command, with additional duty as deputy commander, 23d North American Air Defense/Continental Air Defense Region, with headquarters at Duluth International Airport, Minnesota.

In July 1974 he became commander of the 24th NORAD/CONAD Region and the 24th Air Division, ADC, Malmstrom Air Force Base, Mont. After a command reorganization on July 1, 1975, General Leiser had a position title change to commander, 24th NORAD Region, with additional duty as commander, 24th Air Division, ADCOM. The division was awarded the Air Force Outstanding Unit Award during his tenure.

General Leiser assumed the position of chief of staff of Allied Air Forces Southern Europe at Naples, Italy, April 1, 1977.

He is a command pilot, whose military decorations and awards include the Legion of Merit with oak leaf cluster, Distinguished Flying Cross, Bronze Star Medal, Air Medal with three oak leaf clusters, and the Air Force Commendation Medal.

=== Decorations ===
- Legion of Merit with one oak leaf clusters
- Distinguished Flying Cross
- Bronze Star Medal
- Air Medal with three oak leaf clusters
- Air Force Outstanding Unit Award

=== Activities after retirement ===
He moved to the Washington, D.C. area in the mid 1980s.
