= 5th Space Launch Squadron =

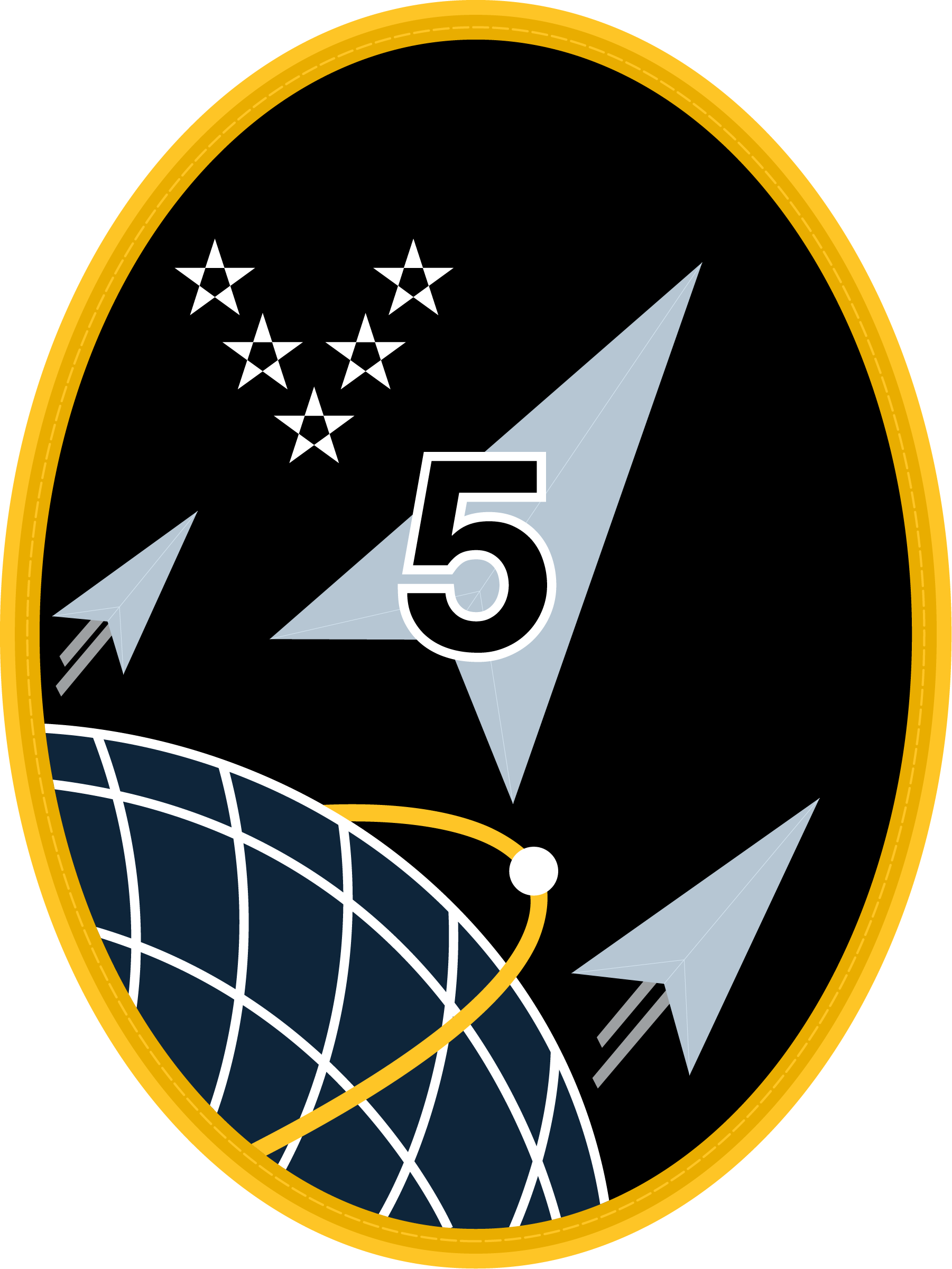
- Emblem of the 5th Space Launch Squadron
- Active: 1994–1998; 2003–present
- Country: United States
- Branch: United States Space Force
- Type: Space squadron
- Role: Space launch
- Part of: Space Operations Command
- Garrison/HQ: Patrick Space Force Base
- Decorations: Air Force Outstanding Unit Award

Commanders
- Current commander: Lt Col Jae Jeon

Insignia
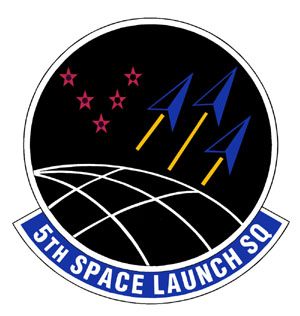
- Previous 5th Space Launch Squadron insignia

The 5th Space Launch Squadron is a space launch unit of the United States Space Force located at Patrick Space Force Base, Florida. The 5th SLS is tasked with launch and support of the National Security Space Launch, Evolved Expendable Launch Vehicles.

== History ==
The 5th Space Launch Squadron was activated on 14 April 1994 at Cape Canaveral Space Force Station, Florida as part of the Space Launch Delta 45, previously 45th Space Wing. The squadron conducted Titan IV booster launch operations, launching classified military payloads into orbit until it was inactivated in June 1998.

The squadron was reactivated on 1 December 2003, and provides launch site mission assurance for all National Security Space Launch mission and has supervised assembly, testing and launch of commercial space boosters from Cape Canaveral since then.

== Lineage ==
- Constituted as the 5th Space Launch Squadron on 29 March 1994

Activated on 14 April 1994
Inactivated on 29 June 1998
Activated on 1 December 2003

=== Assignments ===
- 45th Operations Group, 14 April 1994 – 29 June 1998
- 45th Launch Group, 1 December 2003 – present
- Space Launch Delta 45, – present

=== Stations ===
- Cape Canaveral Air Force Station, Florida, 14 April 1994 – 29 June 1998
- Cape Canaveral Space Force Station, Florida, 1 December 2003 – present

=== Launch vehicles ===
- Titan IV, 1994–1998
- Delta IV, 2003–2024
- Atlas V, 2003–present
- Falcon 9
- Falcon Heavy
- Vulcan

== List of commanders ==
- Lt Col David Schill, June 2021 – present
