= 45th Launch Group =

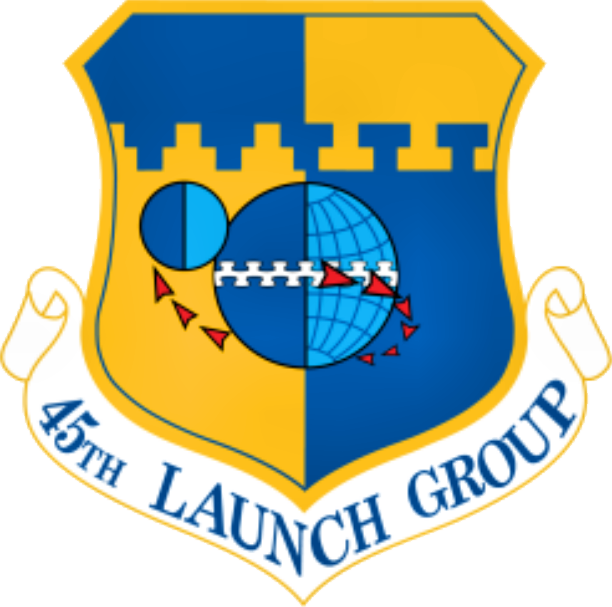
- Emblem of the 45th Launch Group
- Active: 2003-2018
- Country: United States
- Branch: United States Air Force
- Type: Group

Commanders
- Current commander: Colonel Steven Lang

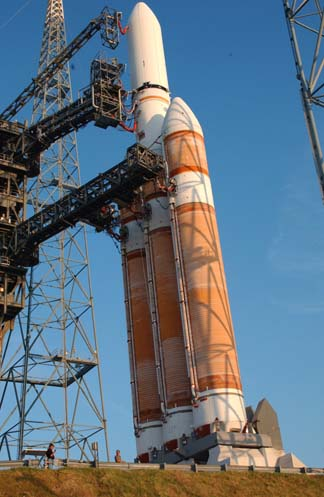
Delta IV Heavy rocket sitting on the launch pad (2004)

The 45th Launch Group was a United States Air Force unit. It was assigned to the 45th Space Wing, stationed at Cape Canaveral Air Force Station, Florida.

The 45th Launch Group participated in receipt, inspection, processing, test, and launch of all flight hardware to ensure the successful launch of Department of Defense (DoD) satellites. The group contributes to mission success through seamless partnership with launch/satellite program offices.

== Components ==
- 5th Space Launch Squadron

The 5th Space Launch Squadron mission was to ensure the success of the Atlas V and Delta IV programs at Cape Canaveral by fostering innovative teamwork among the Wing, SPO and industry.

- 45th Launch Support Squadron

The 45th Launch Support Squadron was the "flightline" for DoD spacecraft. LCSS personnel oversee spacecraft hardware arrival, processing, testing and launch through direct delegation from spacecraft development wings throughout the DoD, ultimately providing launch base mission assurance for the Program Executive Officer for Space. In addition, the squadron is responsible for ensuring continued delivery of critical mission-ready facilities, training and programmatic resources to the launch group, the wing and its customers.

== History ==
In order to handle space operations more effectively, senior officials at Air Force Space Command, Air Force Materiel Command, Space and Missile Systems Center (SMC), 14th Air Force, the 30th Space Wing, and the 45th Space Wing agreed to fine tune the new standard wing organization in 2003. Following approval at the highest levels of the Air Force, an organizational transformation was implemented on 1 December 2003, discontinuing SMC Detachment 8 and activating the 45th Launch Group which also included elements of the 45th Operations Group. As a result of the transformation, the 45th Launch Group was constituted and assigned to Air Force Space Command with further assignment to the 45th Space Wing. The 5th Space Launch Squadron (inactivated 29 June 1998) was reactivated at Cape Canaveral on 1 December 2003. The 5th was placed under the 45th Launch Group, and the squadron was given responsibility for Evolved Expendable Launch Vehicle (EELV) operations formerly held by Detachment 8, along with the 1st Space Launch Squadron performing Delta II operations and the 3rd Space Launch Squadron performing Titan IV and Atlas II/III operations.

The final Atlas IIIB/Centaur and Titan IVB missions were launched from Cape Canaveral in February and April 2005 respectively. Consequently, the 3rd Space Squadron—which had been responsible for managing both launch programs—was inactivated effective 30 June 2005. On the same date, the 45th Launch Support Squadron was activated and placed under the 45th Launch Group. The ceremony for both organizational changes was held at the Cape on the morning of 6 July 2005.

The 1st SLS was inactivated on 18 August 2009, following the final USAF launch of a Delta II which had occurred the previous day.

=== Lineage ===
- Established as 45th Launch Group on 28 Oct 2003

Activated on 1 December 2003.

=== Assignments ===
- 45th Space Wing, 1 December 2003 – Present

=== Units ===
- 1st Space Launch Squadron: 1 December 2003 – 18 August 2009
- 3d Space Launch Squadron: 1 December 2003 – 30 June 2005
- 5th Space Launch Squadron: 1 December 2003 – Present
- 45th Launch Support Squadron: 30 June 2005 – Present

=== Stations ===
- Cape Canaveral Air Force Station, Florida, 1 December 2003 – Present
