= Tweel =

Prototype device developed by Michelin as an alternative to the tire

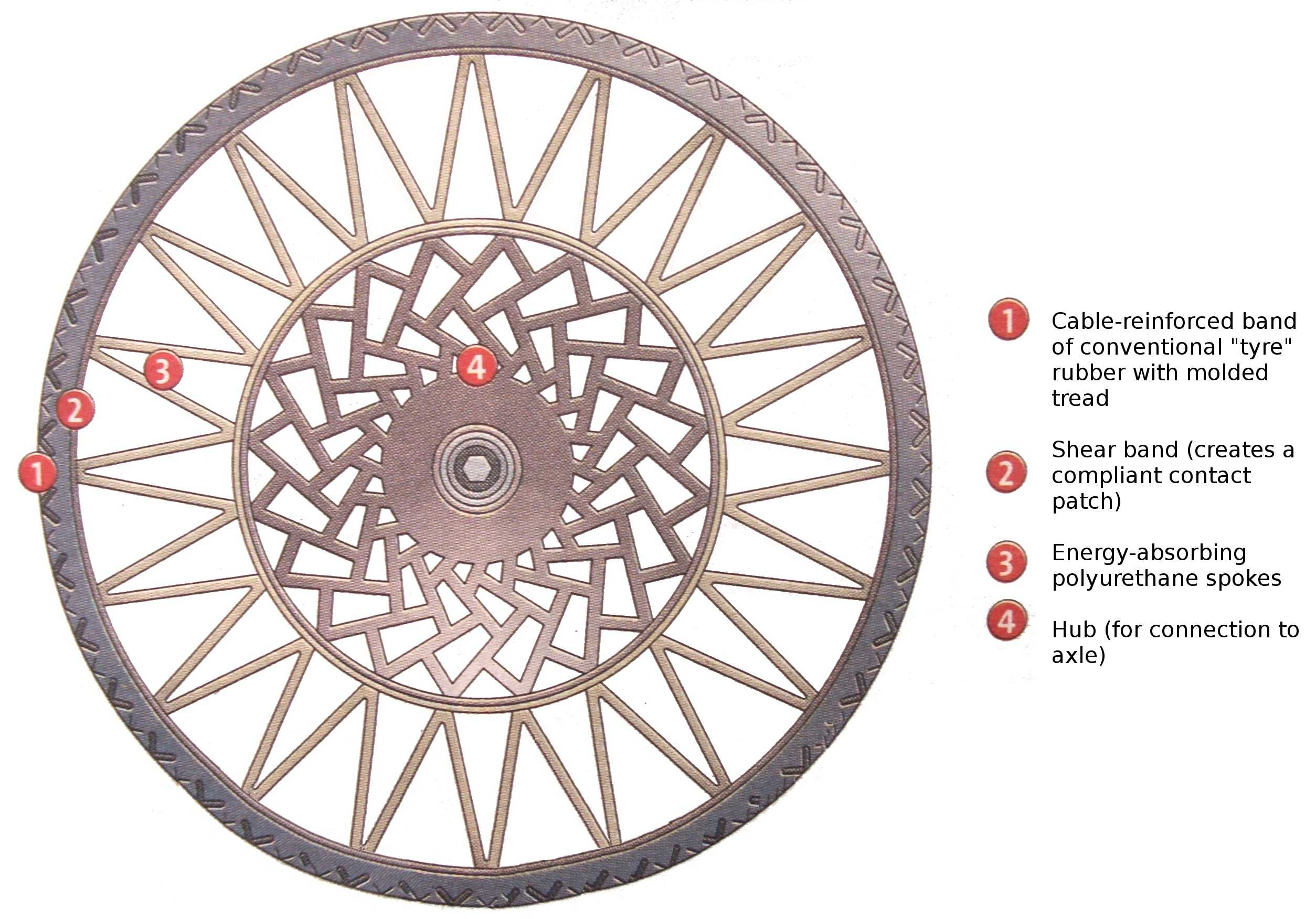
The Tweel airless tire design

The Tweel (a portmanteau of tire and wheel) is an airless tire design developed by the French tire company Michelin. Its significant advantage over pneumatic tires is that the Tweel does not use a bladder full of compressed air, and therefore cannot burst, leak pressure, or become flat. Instead, the Tweel's hub is connected to the rim via flexible polyurethane spokes which fulfil the shock-absorbing role provided by the compressed air in a traditional tire.

== Design ==
The Tweel consists of a band of conventional tire rubber with molded tread, a shear beam just below the tread that creates a compliant contact patch, a series of energy-absorbing polyurethane spokes, and an integral inner hub structure. Both the shear beam and the polyurethane spokes can be designed to provide a calibrated directional stiffness in order to control both how the Tweel handles and how it handles loads. The inner hub structure may be either rigid or compliant, depending on the application requirements, and as such may contain a matrix of deformable plastic structures that flex under load and subsequently return to their original shape. By varying the thickness and size of the spokes the design elements can be manipulated to engineer a wide range of ride and handling qualities. The tread can be as specialized as any conventional tires and is replaceable.

== Benefits and drawbacks ==
Potential benefits of the Tweel include not only the obvious safety and convenience of never having flat tires, but also, in automotive applications, the Tweel airless tire has the potential to be able to brake better – a significant performance compromise that is inherent to pneumatic tires. Unlike a pneumatic tire, a Tweel can be designed to have high lateral stiffness while simultaneously having low vertical stiffness. This can be achieved because, in the design elements of a Tweel, the vertical and lateral stiffness are not inseparably linked and can thus be optimized independently. Because there is no air bladder under the tread, tread patterns can, if desired, even incorporate water evacuation through holes in the design thus eliminating or significantly reducing hydroplaning. Michelin expects the tread to last two to three times as long as a conventional tire. Because the tread rubber around the outer circumference is replaceable when worn (as opposed to disposing of a whole worn tire), the potential environmental impact of a Tweel airless tire can be less than that of a conventional pneumatic tire.

Tweel is useful for: "vehicles that don't have suspensions like lawn mowers – those low speed specialty vehicles that don't have suspensions. The comfort is quite good and better than inflated tyres" said Terry K. Gettys, executive vice-president, research and development, and member of the group executive committee at French tire company Michelin.

Military testing has indicated that the Tweel deflects mine blasts away from the vehicle better than standard tires and that the Tweel remains mobile even with several spokes damaged or missing.

Although it is acknowledged that the initial prototype automotive Tweel tires did demonstrate flaws with regard to noise and high-speed vibration and produced 5 percent more friction compared to a radial tire, these early issues were resolved in subsequent prototypes and, in 2013, automotive Tweel prototype products had been shown to be well-behaved and reliable. As a demonstration of Tweel viability and reliability, three highway-driven vehicles (a 2012 Honda CR-Z, a resto-modded 1955 Morris Minor Traveller, and an Aluma brand trailer hauling a Polaris ATV which was also equipped with Tweel tires) successfully participated in the entire 2013 Hot Rod Power Tour long-distance road trip event in June 2013.

== Applications ==
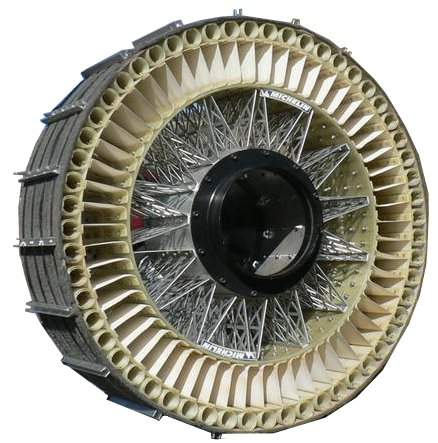
The LRI AB Scarab Tweel

The iBOT mobility device and Segway's Concept Centaur were both introduced with Tweel airless tires. Michelin also has additional projects for the Tweel concept on small construction equipment, such as skid-steer loaders, for which it seems well suited.

NASA has contracted Michelin to develop a wheel for the next-generation lunar rover based on the Tweel concept. This has resulted in the Lunar Rover Initiative AB Scarab wheels.

In October 2012, Michelin North America Inc. began commercial sales of the Michelin 12N16.5 X Tweel for piggyback forklifts and skid-steer loaders used in landscaping, construction, contracting, refuse/recycling and agricultural industries.

== Awards ==
On 8 November 2005, Popular Science magazine named Michelin's Tweel as the "Best of What's New" honor in the Automotive Technology category. The next day, Michelin NA was awarded a Hall of Fame Award by InnoVision for continued leadership in innovation as evidenced by the development of the Tweel. TIME Magazine named the Tweel as "One of the Most Amazing Inventions of 2005" a few short days later on 14 November 2005. The Intermat innovation commission in Paris (the International Exhibition of Equipment, Machinery and Techniques for the Construction and Building Materials Industry) awarded the Tweel with a 2006 Gold Medal for Innovation. This prize reinforced Michelin's technological leadership and rewarded Michelin’s contribution to improvements in productivity and safety for the construction industry. The jury of Intermat 2006 was made up of recognized European experts and professionals and required to rank the innovations according to five criteria:

- Technical design and technologies: improvement in productivity, ease of maintenance;
- Economy: lower purchase price and maintenance costs;
- Quality of work carried out;
- Ease of use, ergonomics, comfort, safety and improvement in working conditions;
- Environmental friendliness.

A Silver Award in the Transportation category was awarded to the Tweel SSL on 26 April 2013 by the 2013 Edison Awards. Of the 7,156 applications received, 131 finalists were selected by the Edison Awards Committee. The Tweel SSL was one of 42 winners, who represented 12 categories and symbolize the persistence and excellence personified by Thomas Alva Edison. The Tweel SSL was selected as one of the 2013 Contractors’ Top 50 New Products by readers of Equipment Today as one of the industry’s most innovative products for the year. In January 2014, Equipment World named one of the “five game-changing” construction products of 2013 for their 2014 Innovations Awards. The Tweel SSL was named as one of those five product winners. The inventors of the Tweel, Timothy B. Rhyne and Steven M. Cron jointly received the Charles Goodyear Medal in recognition of the singular impact of the Tweel.

== Uptis ==
Michelin partnered with GM in 2020 to offer the Unique Puncture-proof Tire System (Uptis) that may be available for the 2024 model vehicles. The tire made its first public appearance at the Internationale Automobil-Ausstellung (IAA) mobility show in Germany on an electric Mini Cooper.

GM began testing the tires on a fleet of 2019 Chevrolet Bolt electric cars with the possibility for the Uptis to be an option on some GM vehicles in 2024.

The Uptis uses an aluminum wheel assembly and rubber reinforced with glass composite and vinyl ester resin, an improvement over designs such as the Tweel.

== See also ==
- Airless tire
- Run-flat tire
