= Edward L. Bolton =

Retired U.S. Air Force general

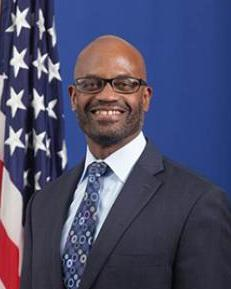
- Official portrait, 2015
- Born: Erie, Pennsylvania, U.S.
- Military career
- Allegiance: United States
- Branch: United States Air Force
- Service years: 1983–2013
- Rank: Major General
- Commands: 45th Space Wing; 30th Operations Group; 30th Range Squadron
- Awards: Defense Superior Service Medal; Legion of Merit

Edward L. Bolton Jr. is a retired United States Air Force major general who last served as the Deputy Assistant Secretary for Budget of the Office of the Assistant Secretary of the Air Force for Financial Management and Comptroller. In 2013, he was the assistant administrator for the Next Generation Air Transportation System (NextGen) at the Federal Aviation Administration On July 1, 2018, he was hired as senior vice president of Defense Systems Group. In November 2023, Bolton was appointed as the Federal Aviation Administration Chief of Staff.

Military offices
Preceded by Susan Helms	Commander of the 45th Space Wing; 2008–2010	Succeeded by B. Edwin Wilson
Preceded by John E. Hyten	Director of Space and Cyber Operations of the United States Air Force; 2010–2011	Succeeded by James K. McLaughlin
Preceded by ???	Deputy Assistant Secretary for Budget of the Office of the Assistant Secretary of the Air Force for Financial Management and Comptroller; 2011–2013	Succeeded by ???
