= Space Launch Delta 45 =

United States Space Force Launch unit

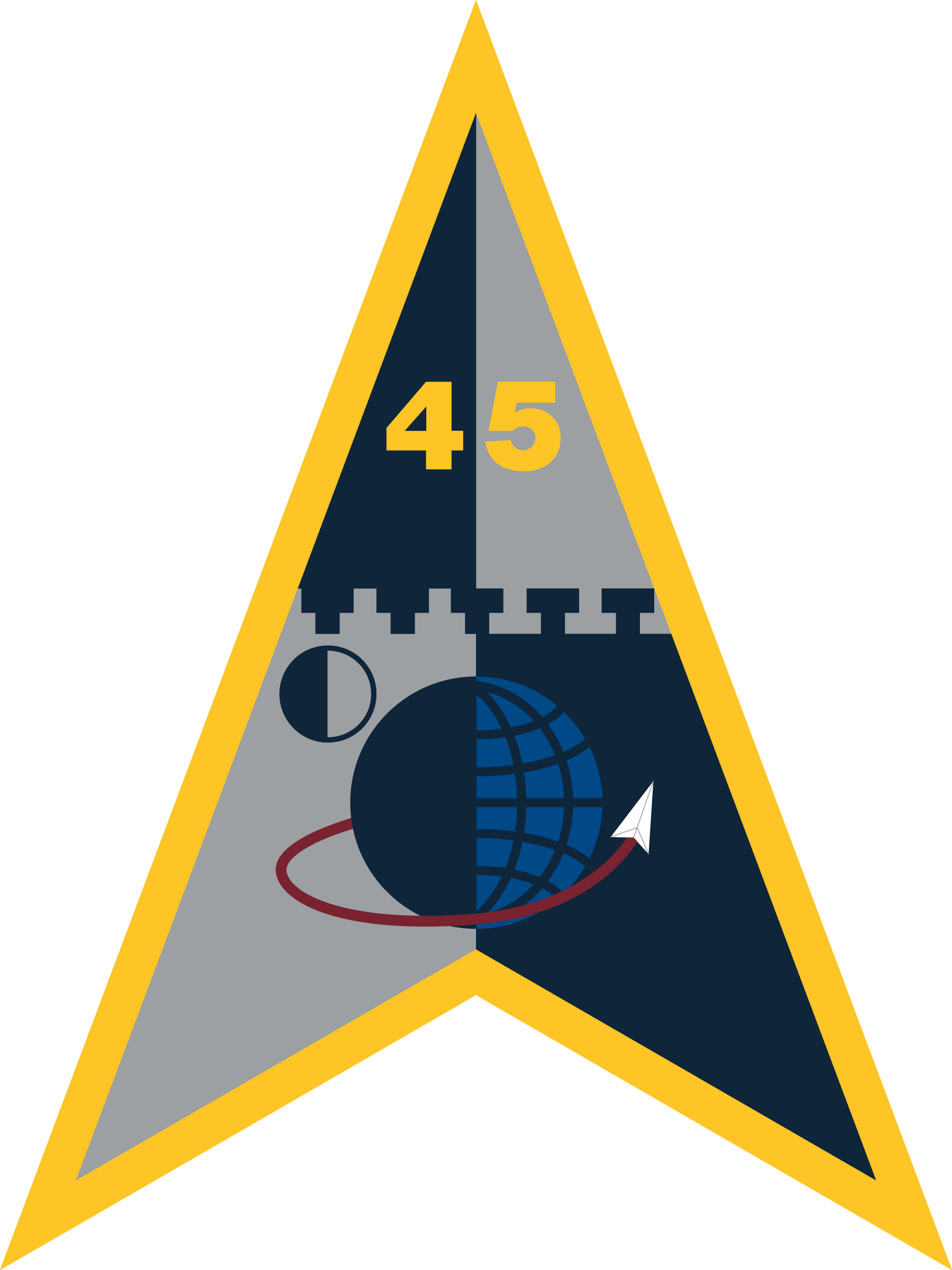
- Emblem of Space Launch Delta 45
- Founded: 12 November 1991; 34 years, 10 months 1 October 1949 (as Air Force Division, Joint Long Range Proving Ground); 11 May 2021 (SLD 45)
- Country: United States
- Branch: United States Space Force
- Type: Delta
- Role: Space launch
- Part of: Space Systems Command
- Headquarters: Patrick Space Force Base, Florida, U.S.
- Motto: Control of the battlefield begins here
- Decorations: Meritorious Unit Commendation (Navy) Air Force Outstanding Unit Award Air Force Organization Excellence Award
- Website: www.patrick.spaceforce.mil

Commanders
- Commander: Col Brian L. Chatman
- Vice Commander for Operations: Col Meredith S. Beg
- Vice Commander for Support: Col Christopher D. Bulson
- Senior Enlisted Leader: CMSgt Susan A. Sparks

Insignia
- Guidon

The Space Launch Delta 45 (SLD 45) is a unit of the United States Space Force. The Space Launch Delta 45 is assigned to Space Systems Command and headquartered at Patrick Space Force Base, Florida. The delta also controls Cape Canaveral Space Force Station. The 45th Space Delta is responsible for all space launch operations from the East Coast. It manages the Eastern Range, including launch activities for the Space Force, Department of Defense (DoD), NASA, and other private space corporations.

== Operations ==
The Space Launch Delta 45 (SLD 45) is one of two space launch wings for the U.S. Space Force, being responsible for executing military, intelligence, civil, and commercial space launches using the Eastern Range. Primary launch vehicles include the Atlas V, Delta IV Heavy, Pegasus, Minotaur, Falcon 9, Falcon Heavy, and Boeing X-37 rockets. It also supports U.S. Navy Trident II D5 ballistic missile tests and evaluation.

The Space Launch Delta 45 (SLD 45) is the host wing for Patrick Space Force Base and Cape Canaveral Space Force Station, providing base support for NASA, the Air Force's Technical Applications Center and 920th Rescue Wing, and U.S. Navy's Naval Ordnance Test Unit.

== 45th Space Wing shield meaning ==
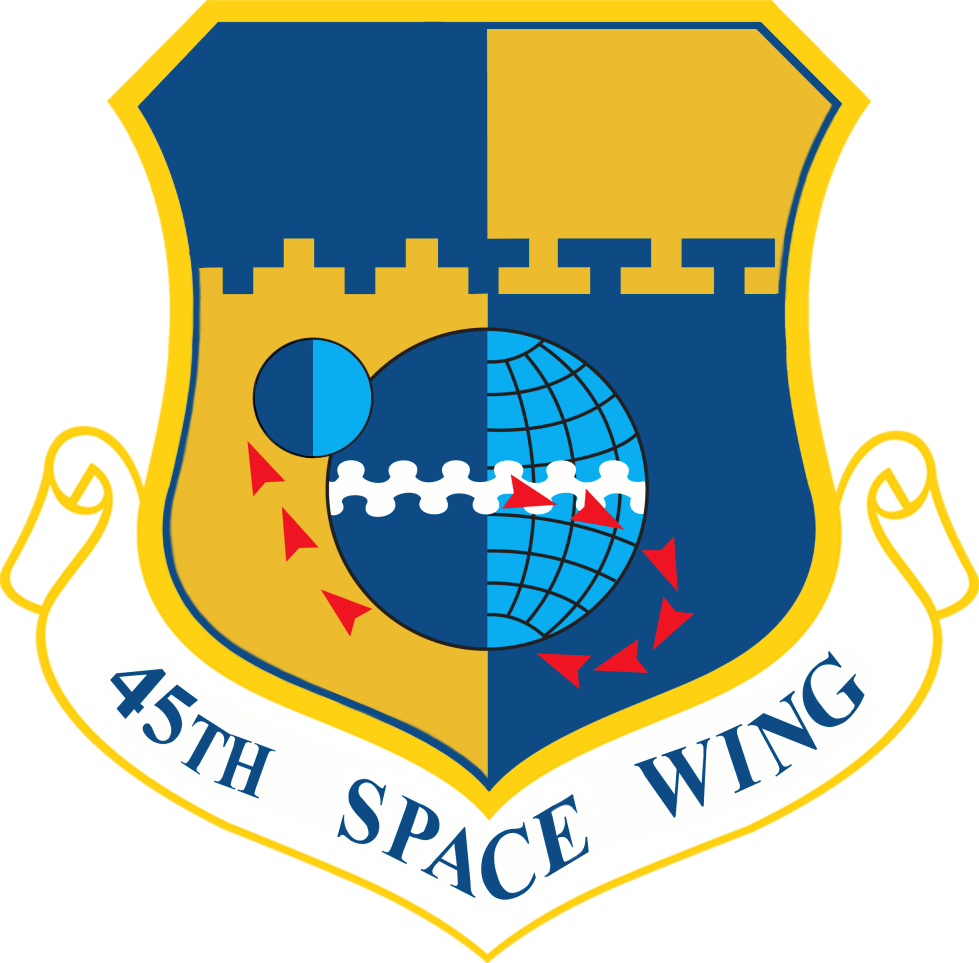
45th Space Wing shield

The blue is used to symbolize the sky and space, while the gold is used to symbolize the excellence required to conduct successful range operations. Dividing the shield horizontally, across its right half, is a line of "Ts", which were adopted from previous patches reflecting the history of the wing's installations as a test center for missiles and space vehicles. In the center of the shield, a large aquamarine and light blue globe represents Earth. A smaller globe, in the same colors, symbolizes the moon and other planets. Nine pimento red flight arrows indicated the normal equatorial departure routes for missiles and space vehicles on the Eastern Range. They also symbolize travel to other planets, as depicted by the smaller globe. Red was chosen for the flight arrows to indicate the stresses of launch and space flight and the heat of re-entry into Earth's atmosphere. A string of white "clouds" across the center of the large globe represent abnormal conditions, weather and radiation with which range personnel have to contend. The cloud symbol is also interpreted as the string of radomes and theodolites located throughout the Eastern Range.

== History ==
=== Air Force Division, Joint Long Range Proving Ground (1949–1950) ===
The Air Force Division, Joint Long Range Proving Ground was established on 1 October 1949. Assigned to Headquarters Command, the Air Force Division include the 4800th Guided Missile Wing, which was gained on 30 December 1950. The Air Force Division, Joint Long Range Proving Ground managed the proving ground for Air Force, Army, and Navy activities, while also running the Air Force's guided missile test program at the facility.

=== Long Range Proving Ground Division (1950–1951) ===
On 16 May 1950 the Air Force Division, Joint Long Range Proving Ground was redesignated as the Long Range Proving Ground Division and reassigned from Headquarters Command to Air Research and Development Command. This renaming was directly in response to the Defense Department changed the status of guided missile testing centers from joint service commands to individual service responsibilities.

=== Air Force Missile Test Center (1951–1964) ===
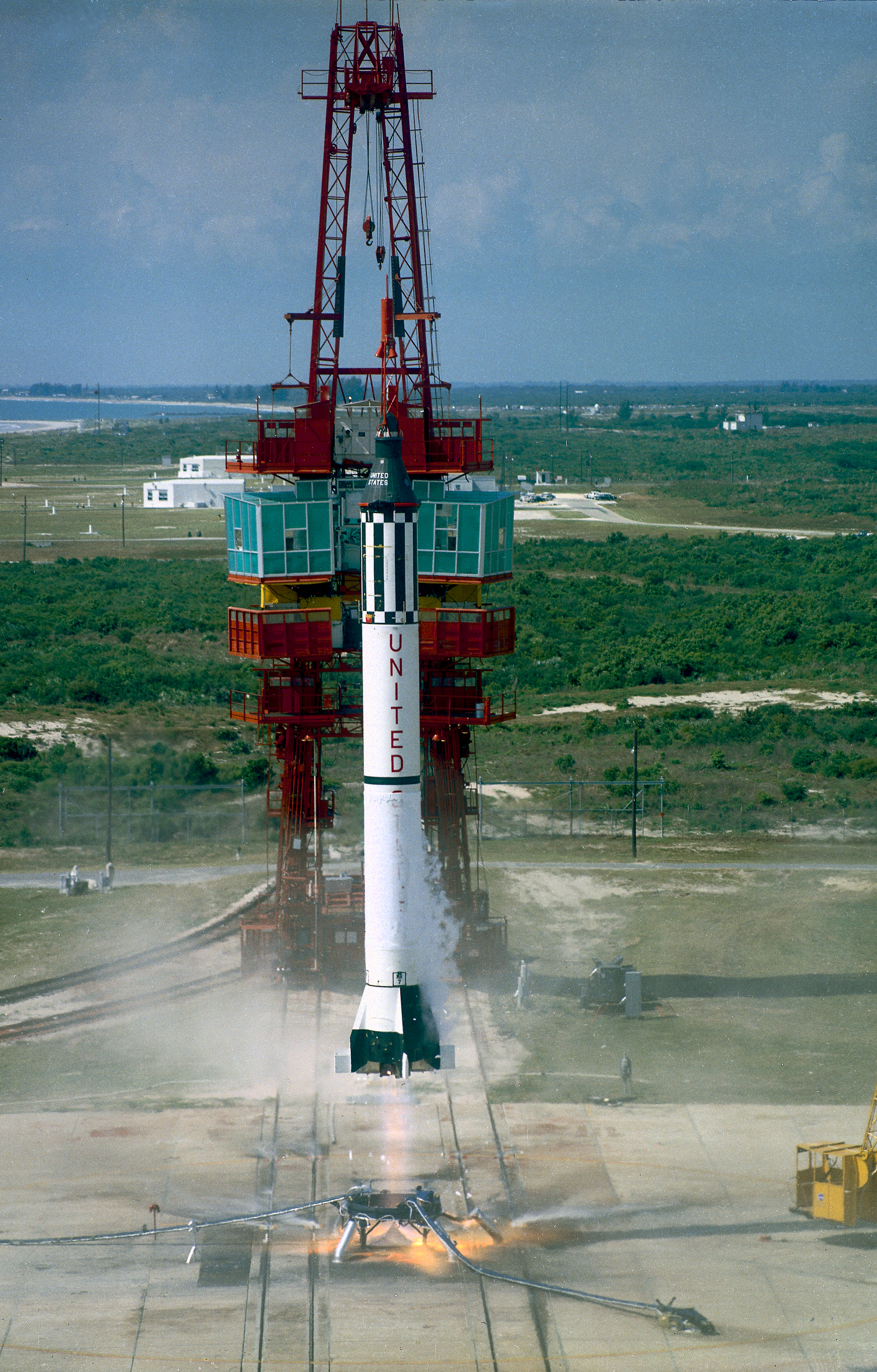
Launch of the Freedom 7 on 5 May 1961, which was the first crewed spaceflight for the United States.

Less than a year later, on 30 June 1951, the Long Range Proving Ground Division was redesignated again, becoming the Air Force Missile Test Center, gaining the 6541st Missile Test Wing, later redesignated as the 6541st Operations Group (Range). The 4800th Guided Missile Wing would also experience redesignation as the 6555th Guided Missile Wing and then as the 6555th Guided Missile Group. Starting in 1955 it would have the 6555th Test Group (Missile) and in 1959 the 6555th Guided Missiles Group (Test and Evaluation) assigned to the center. In 1951 the 1st Pilotless Bomber Squadron would briefly be assigned to the center. Starting in 1954 the 6550th Operations Squadron and 6555th Guided Missile Squadron (later 6555th Guided Missiles Squadron) would also be assigned to the center to assist in its test duties. In 1955 the 6550th Test Group (Missile) was briefly assigned to the Air Force Missile Test Center. In 1961 Air Force Missile Test Center's higher headquarters would change from Air Research and Development Command to Air Force Systems Command.

Throughout the 1950s and 1960s the Air Force Missile Test Center would begin to build permanent launch complexes on Cape Canaveral Air Force Station. The Air Force Missile Test Center performed launch tests of early Air Force missiles, such as the SM-65 Atlas, HGM-25A Titan I, and PGM-17 Thor. These missiles would all be modified into future space launch vehicles.

=== Air Force Eastern Test Range (1964–1977) ===
On 15 May 1964, the Air Force Missile Test Center was redesignated as the Air Force Eastern Test Range (AFETR), (Note: The Air Force Eastern Test Range should not be confused with a similarly named unit, the Eastern Test Range, which was activated at Patrick AFB on 1 February 1977 and assigned to the Eastern Space and Missile Center, this unit became the 45th Range Squadron on 12 November 1991, when it was assigned to the 45th Operations Group. It was inactivated on 1 December 2003.) managing all missile and space launches from the East Coast of the United States, specifically out of Cape Canaveral Air Force Station. It was reassigned to Air Force Systems Command's National Range Division. While the Air Force Eastern Test Range managed the range, launches themselves were managed by the Space Systems Division's 6555th Aerospace Test Wing. In addition to performing national security space launches, the Air Force Eastern Test Range also supported all NASA launches out of Kennedy Space Center, including Project Mercury, Project Gemini, and the Apollo program.

The Air Force Eastern Test Range also continued to provide joint testing support for the Navy, which performed test launches of their submarine-launched ballistic missiles from the Eastern Test Range. Air Force Systems Command resumed direct oversight of the Air Force Eastern Test Range on 1 February 1972, before inactivating the range on 1 February 1977 and centralizing its management through the Space and Missile Systems Organization's Space and Missile Test Center.

=== Eastern Space and Missile Center (1979–1991) ===
In 1979, the Space and Missile Test Center was reorganized, becoming the Space and Missile Test Organization and the Air Force Eastern Test Range was reestablished on 1 October 1970 as the Eastern Space and Missile Center (ESMC), with the 6555th Aerospace Test Group subordinate to it. The Eastern Space and Missile Center assumed responsible for all range management and launch functions, including the management of telemetry stations at Antigua and Ascension Island.

On 1 October 1979, the Space and Missile Test Organization was inactivated and the Eastern Space and Missile Center was directly subordinated to the Space Systems Division. A year later Air Force Systems Command began to transition the space launch mission to Air Force Space Command. On 1 October 1990, the Eastern Space and Missile Systems Center transferred to Air Force Space Command's 9th Space Division. After the 9th Space Division was inactivated on 1 October 1991, the Western Space and Missile Systems Center directly reported to Air Force Space Command.

=== 45th Space Wing (1991–2021) ===
On 12 November 1991, as part of a larger Air Force heritage initiative, the Eastern Space and Missile Center was redesignated as the 45th Space Wing (45 SW), with the 45th Operations Group assuming the lineage of the World War II-era 45th Bombardment Group (Medium). The Eastern Test Range was also renamed as the Eastern Range, to emphasize its operational nature. On 1 July 1993, the 45th Space Wing was assigned to the newly reactivated Fourteenth Air Force.

On 4 June 1999, the 45th Maintenance Squadron was inactivated and its resources were transferred to the 45th Communications Squadron.

On 1 December 2003, the 45th Launch Group was activated to manage launch operations. On 31 July 2018, the 45th Launch Group was remerged with the 45th Operations Group in an effort to streamline Air Force Space Command organizations.

The first launch under the 45th Space Wing was STS-44, with the Atlantis deploying a Defense Support Program (DSP) satellite. The 45th Space Wing also supported a number of other firsts, such as the 22 May 2012 launch of SpaceX COTS Demo Flight 2, which was the first commercial vehicle to dock with the International Space Station. On 21 December 2015, the 45th Space Wing supported the first rocket landing, with Falcon 9 flight 20 landing at Cape Canaveral Air Force Station's Landing Zone 1.

On 20 December 2019, the 45th Space Wing, along with the rest of Air Force Space Command became part of the United States Space Force. The Fourteenth Air Force was redesignated as Space Operations Command, which the 45th Space Wing remained assigned to.

Structure December 2020: 45th Operations Group (45 OG)

- 5th Space Launch Squadron (5 SLS)
- 45th Range Squadron (45 RANS)
- 45th Space Communications Squadron (45 SCS)
- 45th Weather Squadron (45 WS)
- Detachment 3, 45th Operations Group

45th Mission Support Group (45 MSG)

- 45th Civil Engineer Squadron (45 CES)
- 45th Contracting Squadron (45 CONS)
- 45th Force Support Squadron (45 FSS)
- 45th Logistics Readiness Squadron (45 LRS)
- 45th Security Forces Squadron (45 SFS)
- Detachment 1, 45th Mission Support Group, Cape Canaveral Space Force Station
- Detachment 2, 45th Mission Support Group, Ascension Auxiliary Air Field

45th Medical Group (45 MDG)

- 45th Healthcare Operations Squadron (45 HCOS)
- 45th Operational Medical Readiness Squadron (45 OMRS)

45th Comptroller Squadron (45 CPTS)

=== Space Launch Delta 45 (2021-present) ===
Upon the activation of Space Systems Command, the 45th Space Wing will transfer over from Space Operations Command and be renamed Space Launch Delta 45. The transition is performed on 11 May 2021.

In April 2026, SLD 45 provided support and security for the Artemis II moon mission at the Eastern Range in Florida.

== Commanders ==
=== Commander, 45th Space Wing ===
| No. | Commander | | Term | | |
| No. | Portrait | Name | Took office | Left office | Duration |
45th Space Wing
| 1 | Jimmey R. Morrell | Brigadier General; Jimmey R. Morrell | 23 September 1991 | 30 June 1993 | 1 year, 280 days |
| 2 | Robert S. Dickman | Major General; Robert S. Dickman | 30 June 1993 | 24 January 1995 | 1 year, 208 days |
| 3 | Donald G. Cook | Brigadier General; Donald G. Cook | 30 June 1993 | 28 August 1995 | 2 years, 59 days |
| 4 | Robert C. Hinson | Brigadier General; Robert C. Hinson | 28 August 1995 | 27 March 1997 | 1 year, 211 days |
| 5 | F. Randall Starbuck | Brigadier General; F. Randall Starbuck | 27 March 1997 | 20 August 1999 | 2 years, 146 days |
| 6 | Donald P. Pettit | Brigadier General; Donald P. Pettit | 20 August 1999 | 7 June 2002 | 2 years, 291 days |
| 7 | J. Gregory Pavlovich | Brigadier General; J. Gregory Pavlovich | 7 June 2002 | 26 August 2004 | 2 years, 80 days |
| 8 | Mark H. Owen | Colonel; Mark H. Owen | 26 August 2004 | 21 June 2006 | 1 year, 299 days |
| 9 | Susan J. Helms | Brigadier General; Susan J. Helms | 21 June 2006 | 28 October 2008 | 2 years, 129 days |
| 10 | Edward L. Bolton Jr. | Brigadier General; Edward L. Bolton Jr. | 28 October 2008 | 12 February 2010 | 1 year, 107 days |
| 11 | B. Edwin Wilson | Brigadier General; B. Edwin Wilson | 12 February 2010 | 30 August 2011 | 1 year, 199 days |
| 12 | Anthony J. Cotton | Brigadier General; Anthony J. Cotton | 30 August 2011 | 12 June 2013 | 1 year, 286 days |
| 13 | Nina Armagno | Brigadier General; Nina Armagno | 12 June 2013 | 4 August 2015 | 2 years, 53 days |
| 14 | Wayne Monteith | Brigadier General; Wayne Monteith | 4 August 2015 | 23 August 2018 | 3 years, 19 days |
| 15 | Douglas Schiess | Brigadier General; Douglas Schiess | 23 August 2018 | 4 December 2020 | 2 years, 103 days |
| - | Brande H. Walton | Colonel; Brande H. Walton; Acting | 4 December 2020 | 5 January 2021 | 32 days |
| 16 | Stephen G. Purdy | Brigadier General; Stephen G. Purdy | 5 January 2021 | 11 May 2021 | 126 days |
Space Launch Delta 45
| 16 | Stephen G. Purdy | Major General; Stephen G. Purdy | 11 May 2021 | 30 June 2023 | 2 years, 50 days |
| 17 | Kristin Panzenhagen | Brigadier General; Kristin Panzenhagen | 30 June 2023 | 26 June 2025 | 1 year, 361 days |
| 18 | Brian L. Chatman | Colonel; Brian L. Chatman | 26 June 2025 | Incumbent | 1 year, 85 days |

== See also ==
- Air Force Space & Missile Museum
- 6555th Aerospace Test Group
