= Donald G. Cook =

United States Air Force general

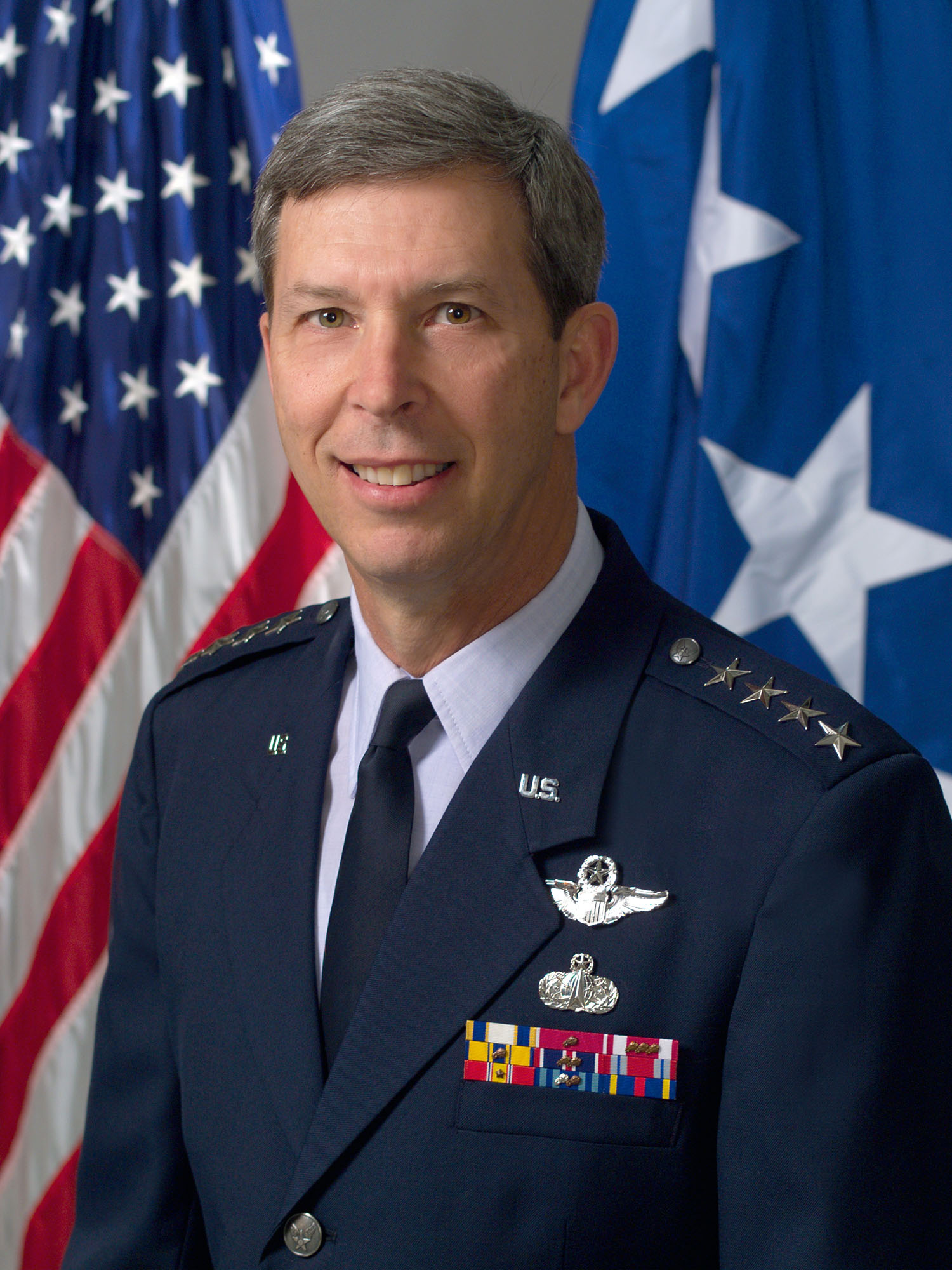
- General Donald G. Cook
- Born: August 13, 1946 (age 80)
- Military career
- Allegiance: United States of America
- Branch: United States Air Force
- Service years: 1969–2005
- Rank: General
- Commands: Air Education and Training Command; 20th Air Force; 45th Space Wing; 21st Space Wing
- Awards: Air Force Distinguished Service Medal; Legion of Merit (2)
- Other work: Board of Directors, Burlington Northern Santa Fe

Donald Graham Cook (born August 13, 1946) is a retired United States Air Force four-star general who served as commander, Air Education and Training Command at Randolph Air Force Base, Texas from 2001 to 2005.

Cook entered the Air Force in 1969 through the ROTC program at Michigan State University. He completed undergraduate pilot training at Williams Air Force Base, Arizona. He has commanded a flying training wing, two space wings and the 20th Air Force. He has served as Legislative Liaison in the Senate Liaison Office, on the staff of the House Armed Services Committee, and as director for expeditionary aerospace force implementation at U.S. Air Force headquarters. Prior to assuming command of Air Education and Training Command, he was assigned to Air Combat Command as vice commander. He is a command pilot and has flown more than 3,300 hours in the B-52D/G/H, T-37B and T-38A.

After retirement, Cook was elected to the board of directors of Burlington Northern Santa Fe Corporation, Crane Corporation, HawkerBeechcraft Corporation and USAA Federal Savings Bank.

== Education ==
- 1969 Bachelor of Arts degree in advertising communications, Michigan State University
- 1975 Squadron Officer School, Maxwell AFB, Alabama
- 1976 Master's degree in business administration, Southern Illinois University
- 1982 Armed Forces Staff College, Norfolk, Virginia
- 1987 Air War College, Maxwell AFB, Alabama
- 1996 National Security Leadership Course, Maxwell School of Citizenship and Public Affairs, Syracuse University, and School of Advanced International Studies, Johns Hopkins University

== Assignments ==
- December 1969 – December 1970, student, undergraduate pilot training, Williams AFB, Arizona
- January 1971 – April 1972, T-37 instructor pilot, Webb AFB, Texas
- April 1972 – March 1974, T-37 instructor pilot, Moody AFB, Georgia
- March 1974 – June 1974, B-52 training, Castle AFB, California
- June 1974 – June 1978, aircraft commander and instructor pilot, 2nd Bomb Squadron, later, Chief of Mission Development and Chief of Training Flight, 22nd Bomb Wing, March AFB, California
- June 1978 – August 1981, resource manager, chief of special actions division, and assistant for colonel assignments, Headquarters Air Force Military Personnel Center, Randolph AFB, Texas
- January 1982 – March 1984, chief of Program Evaluation Division, Deputy Chief of Staff for Plans and Programs, Headquarters Strategic Air Command, Offutt AFB, Nebraska
- October 1984 – June 1986, commander, 325th Bomb Squadron, Fairchild AFB, Washington
- July 1986 – June 1987, student, Air War College, Maxwell AFB, Alabama
- August 1987 – November 1987, chief of Special Activities Division, Headquarters U.S. Air Force Programs and Resources, Washington, D.C.
- November 1987 – November 1988, Air Force representative to the House Armed Services Committee, Washington, D.C.
- November 1988 – July 1989, deputy commander for operations, 7th Bombardment Wing, Carswell AFB, Texas
- July 1989 – June 1990, vice commander, 7th Bombardment Wing, Carswell AFB, Texas
- June 1990 – July 1991, commander, 3415th Air Base Group, Lowry AFB, Colorado
- July 1991 – July 1992, commander, 47th Flying Training Wing, Laughlin AFB, Texas
- August 1992 – August 1993, chief of Senate Liaison Office, Office of the Secretary of the Air Force for Legislative Liaison, Washington, D.C.
- August 1993 – January 1995, commander, 21st Space Wing, Peterson AFB, Colorado
- January 1995 – August 1995, commander, 45th Space Wing, Patrick AFB, Florida
- August 1995 – June 1996, director of operations, Headquarters Air Force Space Command, Peterson AFB, Colorado
- June 1996 – September 1998, commander, 20th Air Force, Francis E. Warren AFB, Wyoming
- September 1998 – July 1999, director for expeditionary aerospace force implementation, Deputy Chief of Staff for Air and Space Operations, Headquarters U.S. Air Force, Washington, D.C.
- July 1999 – June 2000, vice commander, Air Force Space Command, Peterson AFB, Colorado
- June 2000 – December 2001, vice commander, Air Combat Command, Langley AFB, Virginia
- December 2001 – 2005, commander, Air Education and Training Command, Randolph Air Force Base, Texas

== Flight information ==
- Rating: Command pilot
- Flight hours: More than 3,300
- Aircraft flown: B-52D/G/H, T-37B and T-38A

== Awards and decorations ==
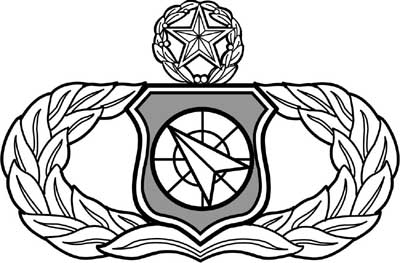
US Air Force Command Pilot Badge
Command Space and Missile Operations Badge

Air Force Distinguished Service Medal
Legion of Merit with two bronze oak leaf clusters
Meritorious Service Medal with three oak leaf clusters
Air Force Commendation Medal with oak leaf cluster
Air Force Outstanding Unit Award with two bronze oak leaf clusters
Combat Readiness Medal
National Defense Service Medal with two bronze service stars
Air Force Longevity Service Award with silver and two bronze oak leaf clusters
Air Force Training Ribbon

== Effective dates of promotion ==
- Second lieutenant November 26, 1969
- First lieutenant May 26, 1971
- Captain November 26, 1972
- Major July 1, 1981
- Lieutenant colonel March 1, 1984
- Colonel July 1, 1988
- Brigadier general August 1, 1993
- Major general September 1, 1996
- Lieutenant general October 6, 1999
- General December 17, 2001

== Personal ==
Daughter Stephanie Cook Griffin, Son Christopher Cook
