= Kenneth S. Wilsbach =

United States Air Force general (born 1963)

Ken Wilsbach
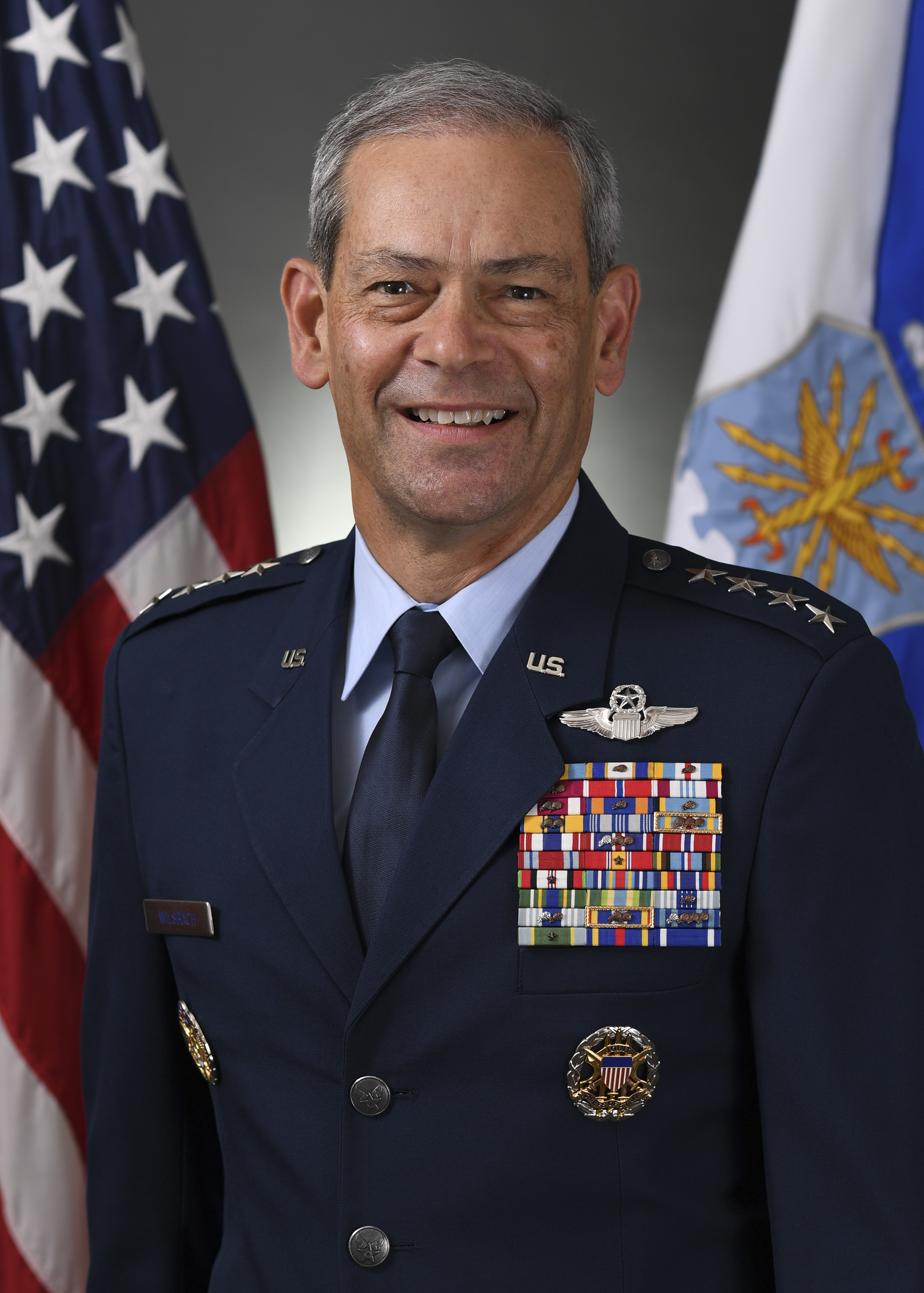
- Official portrait, 2025
- Born: Kenneth Stephen Wilsbach c.1963 (age 62–63)
- Education: University of Florida (BS); Embry-Riddle Aeronautical University, Daytona Beach (MS); Naval War College (MS); National Defense University (MA)
- Military career
- Allegiance: United States
- Branch: United States Air Force
- Service years: 1985–present
- Rank: General
- Commands: Chief of Staff of the Air Force; Air Combat Command; Pacific Air Forces; Seventh Air Force; Eleventh Air Force; 9th Air and Space Expeditionary Task Force; 18th Wing; 53rd Wing; 33rd Operations Group; 19th Fighter Squadron
- Conflicts: Iraqi no-fly zones conflict; Operation Northern Watch; Operation Southern Watch; War in Afghanistan; 2026 Iran war
- Awards: Defense Distinguished Service Medal (2); Air Force Distinguished Service Medal; Defense Superior Service Medal (2); Legion of Merit (3)

Kenneth Stephen Wilsbach (born c. 1963) is an American general who serves as the 24th chief of staff of the United States Air Force since 2025. He previously served as the commander of Air Combat Command from 2024 to 2025, and prior to that, he served as the commander of Pacific Air Forces from 2020 to 2024.

== Military career ==
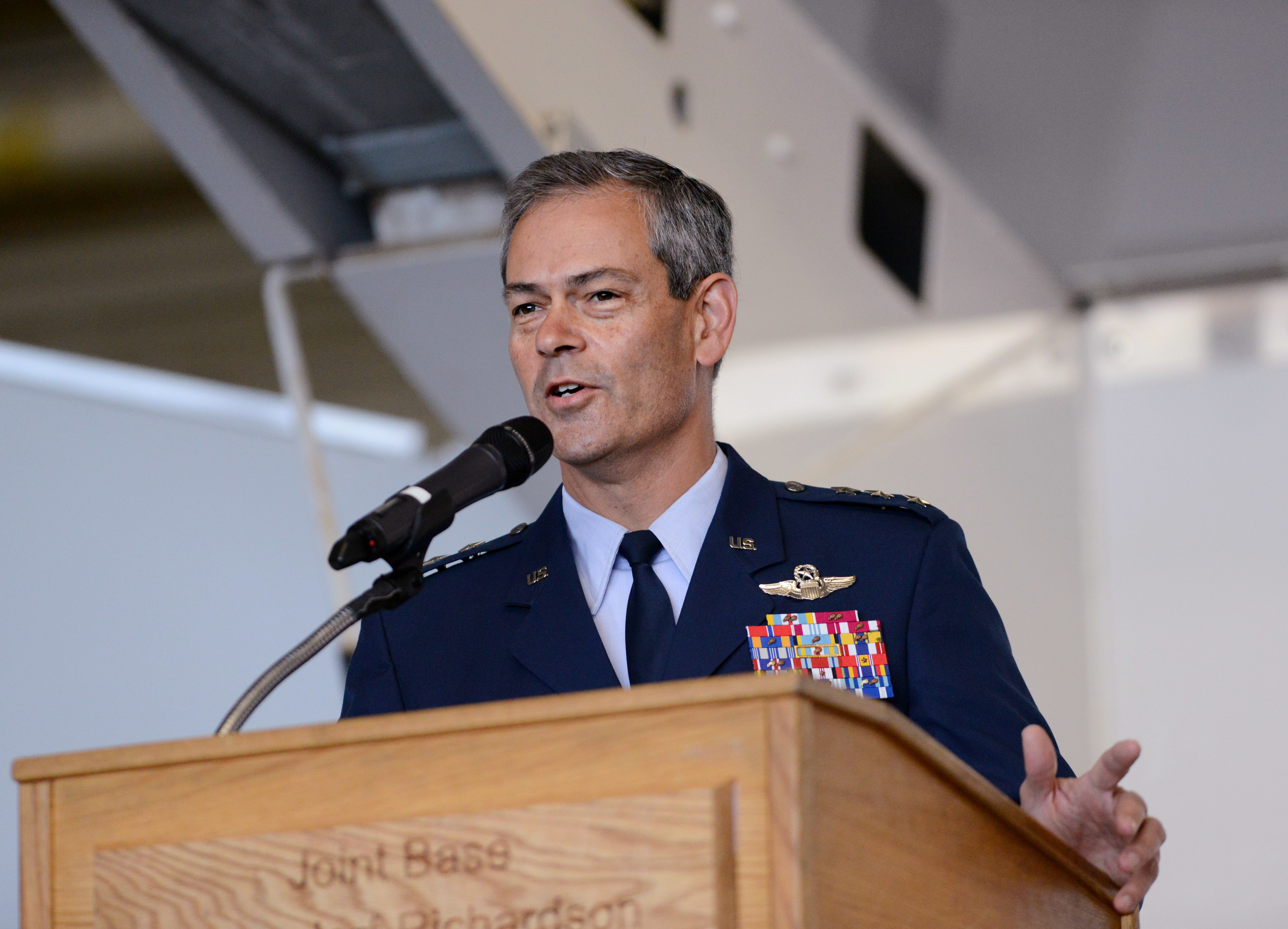
Lieutenant General Kenneth S. Wilsbach at Joint Base Elmendorf-Richardson, Alaska in 2018

Wilsbach was commissioned in 1985 as a distinguished graduate of the University of Florida's Air Force Reserve Officer Training Corps program, and earned his pilot wings in 1986 at Laughlin Air Force Base, Texas. He has commanded a fighter squadron, an operations group, and two wings, and has held various staff assignments including director of operations, Combined Air Operations Center, and director of operations, United States Central Command.

Wilsbach served as director of operations for Pacific Air Forces at Hickam Air Force Base in Hawaii. From 2006 through 2008 he served as commander of the 53rd Wing at Eglin Air Force Base in Florida.

Wilsbach was promoted to the rank of brigadier general on 17 August 2009 and served as the commander of the 18th Wing at Kadena Air Base, Japan. He was the commander, 9th Air and Space Expeditionary Task Force- Iraq; Commander-Air, U.S. Forces- Iraq; and Chief of Staff-Air, International Security Assistance Force Joint Command. He oversaw three air expeditionary air wings and three expeditionary groups consisting of more than 6,900 Airmen directly engaged in combat operations, and advised on joint expeditionary tasked/individual augmentee taskings in the Iraq combined joint operating area. Additionally, Wilsbach served as the Central Command Combined Forces Air Component Commander's personal representative to the commander of Headquarters ISAF as well as the Commander-Air to the Commander U.S. Forces- Iraq, ensuring the optimal integration of air and space power in support of Headquarters ISAF and Operation Enduring Freedom missions.

In June 2018, while serving as commander of the Eleventh Air Force, Wilsbach was nominated for reassignment as deputy commander of United States Forces Korea and commander of the Seventh Air Force. In May 2020, Wilsbach was nominated for promotion to general and reassignment as commander, Pacific Air Forces (PACAF), and Air Component Commander for United States Indo-Pacific Command.

In May 2023, Wilsbach was nominated for assignment as commander, Air Combat Command.

Wilsbach has flown 71 combat missions in Operations Northern Watch, Southern Watch and Enduring Freedom.

On 11 August 2025, Wilsbach passed command of Air Combat Command to General Adrian L. Spain after finishing his three years tenured as commanding General of Air Combat Command.

=== Air Force Chief of Staff ===
Only after a month into his transition period for retirement, General Wilsbach was recalled to active-duty for appointment as the 24th chief of staff of the Air Force, succeeding the retiring General David W. Allvin.

On 1 November 2025, the Senate confirmed Wilsbach to be the chief of staff of the Air Force.

In 2025, the Department of Defense purchased a Steinway Grand Piano worth over $98,000 for Wilsbach's government provided quarters.

On 6 March 2026 he sent a letter to the entire Air Force, the second since he became chief of staff, telling airmen to be prepared to support the war with Iran that began on 28 February 2026.

== Education ==
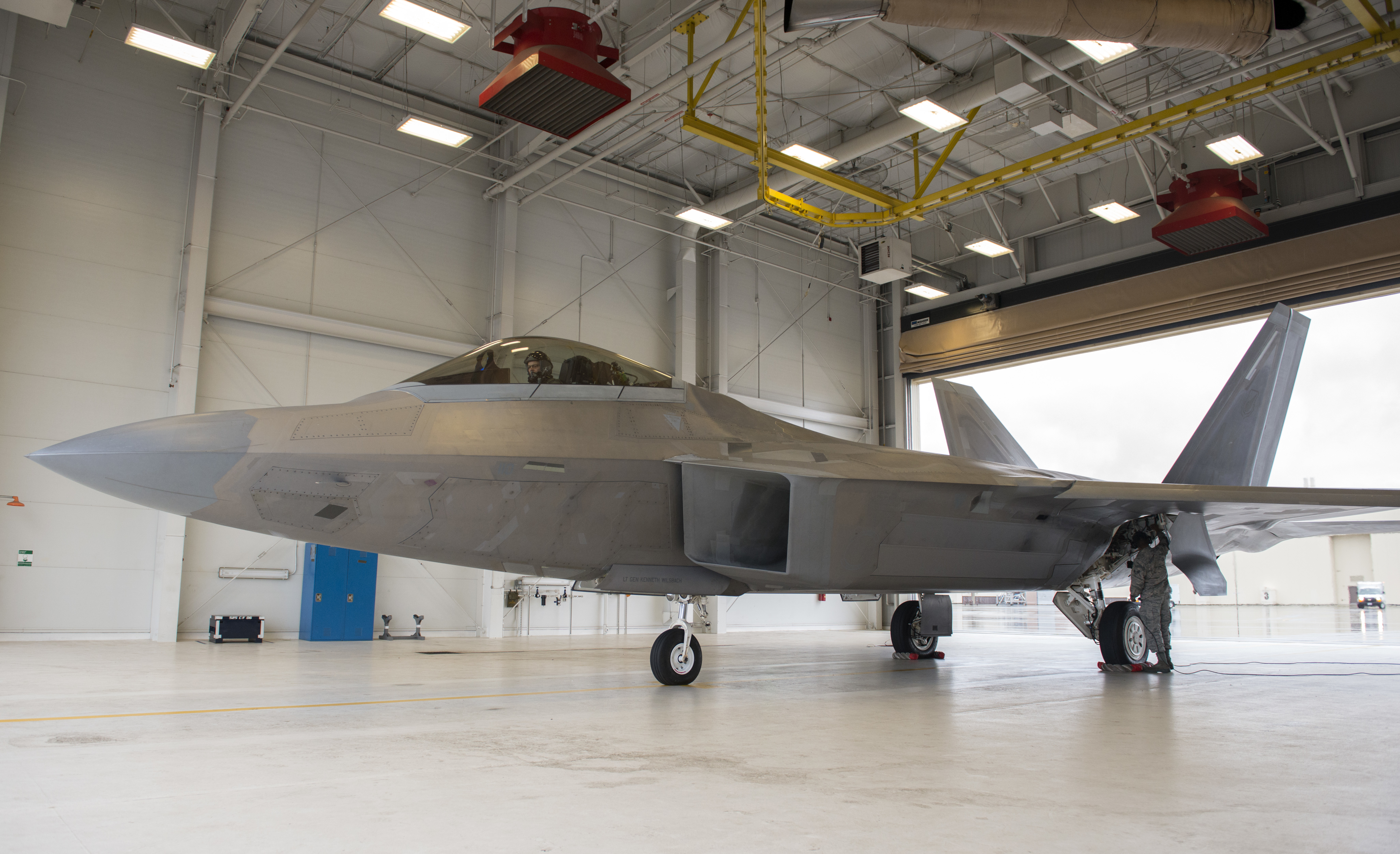
Lieutenant General Kenneth S. Wilsbach Flying a Lockheed-Martin F-22 Raptor

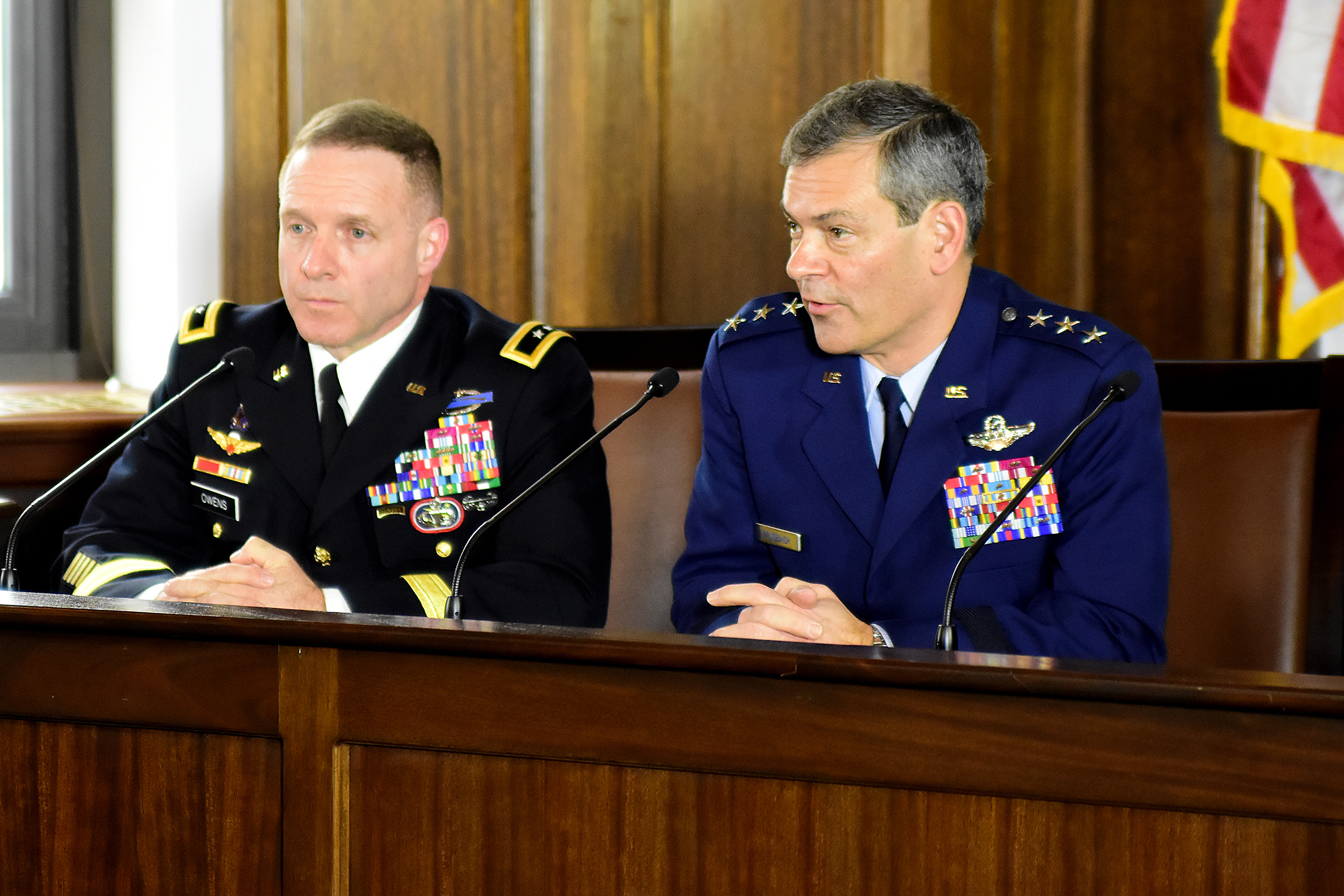
Lieutenant General Kenneth S. Wilsbach during the Senate Armed Services Committee Hearing at Capitol Hill

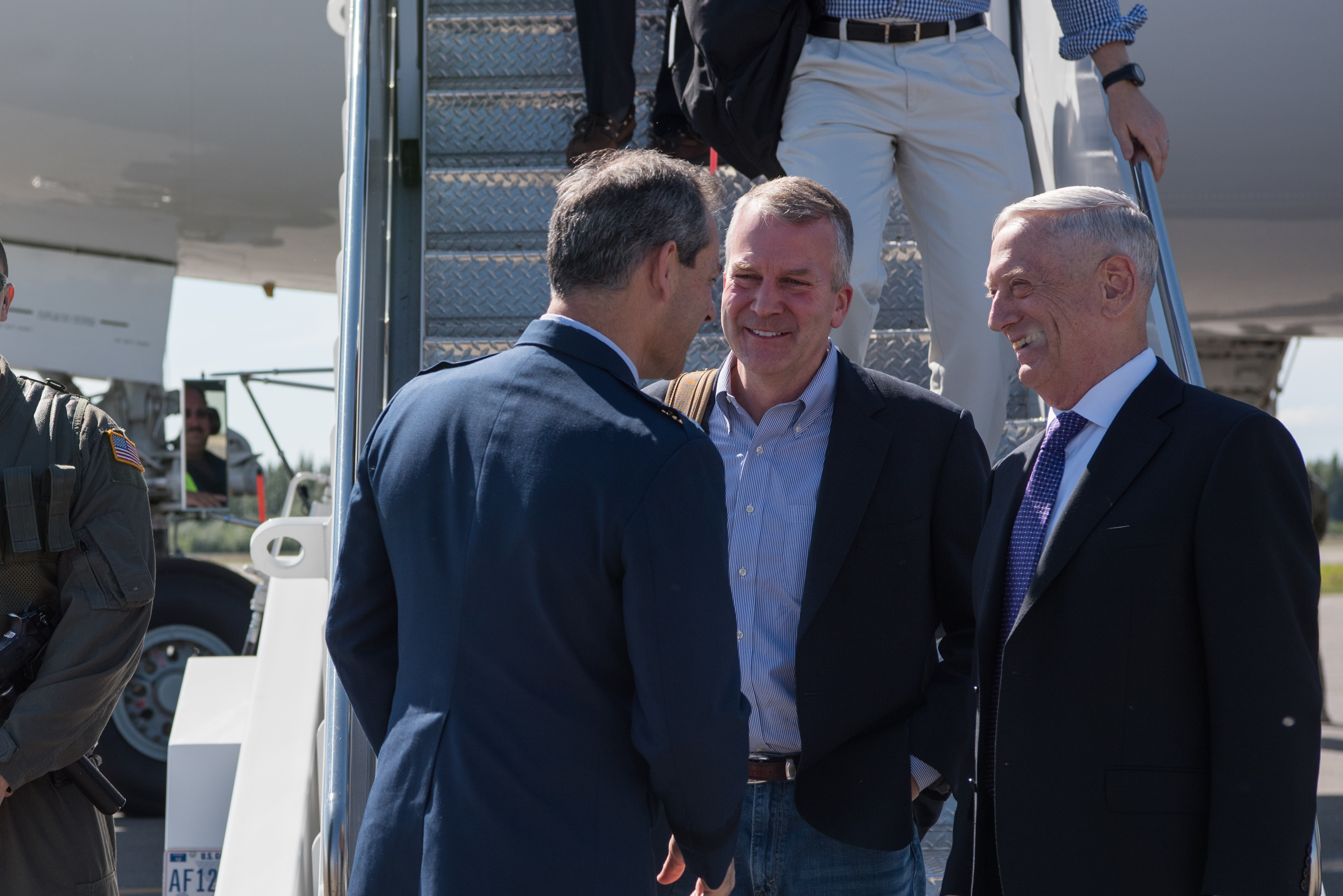
Lieutenant General Kenneth S. Wilsbach greeted U.S. Secretary of Defense James Mattis at Fairbanks, Alaska

- 1985 Bachelor of Science degree in broadcast communication, University of Florida, Gainesville
- 1990 Squadron Officer School, Maxwell AFB, Ala.
- 1992 USAF Fighter Weapons Instructor Course, Nellis AFB, Nev.
- 1997 Master of Aerospace Science degree, Embry-Riddle Aeronautical University, Daytona Beach, Fla.
- 1998 Master of Science degree in national securities and strategic studies, Naval Command and Staff College, Newport, R.I.
- 2003 Master of Arts degree in national security strategy, Industrial College of the Armed Forces at National Defense University, Fort Lesley J. McNair, Washington, D.C.
- 2006 Leadership Development Program, Center for Creative Leadership, Greensboro, N.C.
- 2007 Enterprise Leadership Seminar, University of North Carolina at Chapel Hill
- 2008 Program for Senior Executive Fellows, John F. Kennedy School of Government, Harvard University, Cambridge, Mass.
- 2010 Joint Forces Air Component Commander Course, Maxwell AFB, Ala.
- 2011 CAPSTONE Executive Development Course, Fort Lesley J. McNair, Washington, D.C.
- 2013 Coalition Forces Land Component Commander Course, Carlisle Barracks, Pa.
- 2014 End mission at Afghanistan.
- 2015 Syria for special duty with the North Atlantic Treaty Organization (NATO).

== Assignments ==
- November 1985 – October 1986, student, undergraduate pilot training, Laughlin AFB, Texas
- July 1987 – February 1991, F-15 instructor pilot, 94th Tactical Fighter Squadron, Langley AFB, Va.
- February 1991 – July 1993, F-15 instructor pilot and APG-63/70 Test Team Manager, 84th Test Squadron, Tyndall AFB, Fla.
- July 1993 – May 1996, instructor pilot and chief, weapons and tactics, 44th Fighter Squadron, Kadena Air Base, Japan
- May 1996 – July 1997, aide-de-camp to Commander in Chief, Pacific Command, Camp H.M. Smith, Hawaii
- August 1997 – June 1998, student, Naval Command and Staff College, Newport, R.I.
- September 1998 – June 2000, assistant operations officer, and operations officer, 19th Fighter Squadron, Elmendorf AFB, Alaska
- June 2000 – May 2002, commander, 19th Fighter Squadron, Elmendorf AFB, Alaska
- July 2002 – June 2003, student, Industrial College of the Armed Forces, Fort Lesley J. McNair, Washington, D.C.
- July 2003 – July 2004, director of operations, Combined Air Operations Center, and director of operations, Central Command Air Forces Forward, Southwest Asia
- September 2004 – May 2006, commander, 33rd Operations Group, Eglin AFB, Fla.
- May 2006 – April 2008, commander, 53rd Wing, Eglin AFB, Fla.
- April 2008 – June 2009, assistant director of operations, plans, requirements and programs, Headquarters Pacific Air Forces, Hickam AFB, Hawaii
- July 2009 – June 2011, commander, 18th Wing, Kadena Air Base, Japan
- June 2011 – April 2013, deputy director for Operations, Pacific Command, Camp H.M. Smith, Hawaii
- April 2013 – April 2014, commander, 9th Air and Space Expeditionary Task Force; commander, NATO Air Command-Afghanistan; deputy commander-air, U.S. Forces-Afghanistan; and deputy chief of staff-air, International Security Assistance Force-Afghanistan
- May 2014 – August 2016, director of operations, U.S. Central Command, MacDill AFB, Fla.
- August 2016 – August 2018, commander, Alaskan Region, North American Aerospace Defense Command; commander, Alaskan Command, U.S. Northern Command; and commander, 11th Air Force, Pacific Air Forces, Joint Base Elmendorf-Richardson, Alaska
- August 2018 – July 2020, deputy commander, United States Forces Korea; commander, Air Component Command, United Nations Command; commander, Air Component Command, Combined Forces Command; and commander, 7th Air Force, Pacific Air Forces, Osan Air Base, Republic of Korea
- July 2020 – February 2024, commander, Pacific Air Forces; air component commander for U.S. Indo-Pacific Command; and executive director, Pacific Air Combat Operations Staff, Joint Base Pearl Harbor-Hickam, Hawaii
- February 2024 – August 2025, Commander, Air Combat Command, Joint Base Langley-Eustis, Va.

== Flight Information ==
Rating: Command Pilot
Flight Hours: 6100
Aircraft flown: F-16C, F-22A, MC-12W, F-15A-D, T-38, T-37.

== Awards and decorations ==
US Air Force Command Pilot Badge

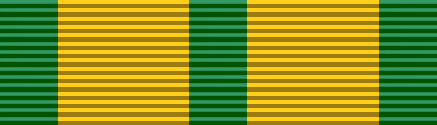
Defense Distinguished Service Medal with one bronze oak leaf cluster
Air Force Distinguished Service Medal
Defense Superior Service Medal with oak leaf cluster
Legion of Merit with two oak leaf clusters
Bronze Star Medal
Defense Meritorious Service Medal
Meritorious Service Medal with oak leaf cluster
Air Medal with oak leaf cluster
Aerial Achievement Medal with oak leaf cluster
Air Force Commendation Medal with two oak leaf clusters
Air Force Achievement Medal
Joint Meritorious Unit Award with two oak leaf clusters
Air Force Meritorious Unit Award
Air Force Outstanding Unit Award with one silver and one bronze oak leaf clusters
Combat Readiness Medal
National Defense Service Medal with one bronze service star
Armed Forces Expeditionary Medal
Afghanistan Campaign Medal with service star
Global War on Terrorism Expeditionary Medal
Global War on Terrorism Service Medal
Korea Defense Service Medal
Air Force Overseas Short Tour Service Ribbon
Air Force Overseas Long Tour Service Ribbon with one silver and one bronze oak leaf clusters
Air Force Expeditionary Service Ribbon with two oak leaf clusters and gold frame
Air Force Longevity Service Award with one silver and three bronze oak leaf clusters
Small Arms Expert Marksmanship Ribbon with service star
Air Force Training Ribbon
Order of National Security Merit, Gukseon Medal (Republic of Korea)
NATO Medal for service with ISAF
Alaska Legion of Merit
Grand Cordon of the Order of the Rising Sun
Office of the Joint Chiefs of Staff Identification Badge

== Promotions ==
Insignia	Rank (US Air Force)	Date
	General	8 Jul 2020
	Lieutenant general	16 Aug 2016
	Major general	19 Apr 2013
	Brigadier general	17 Aug 2009
	Colonel	1 Jul 2004
	Lieutenant colonel	1 Jul 1999
	Major	1 Dec 1995
	Captain	5 Sep 1989
	First lieutenant	5 Sep 1987
	Second lieutenant	18 Nov 1985

Military offices
Preceded by Tod D. Wolters	Commander of the 9th Air and Space Expeditionary Task Force-Afghanistan; 2013–2014	Succeeded by John K. McMullen
Preceded by Russell J. Handy	Commander of the Eleventh Air Force; 2016–2018	Succeeded by Thomas A. Bussiere
Preceded by Thomas W. Bergeson	Commander of the Seventh Air Force; 2018–2020	Succeeded by Scott L. Pleus
Preceded by Charles Q. Brown Jr.	Commander of the Pacific Air Forces; 2020–2024	Succeeded by Kevin B. Schneider
Preceded by Mark D. Kelly	Commander of Air Combat Command; 2024–2025	Succeeded by Adrian L. Spain
Preceded by David W. Allvin	Chief of Staff of the United States Air Force; 2025–present	Incumbent
Order of precedence
Preceded by Daryl L. Caudle as Chief of Naval Operations	Order of precedence of the United States as Chief of Staff of the Air Force	Succeeded by Steven Nordhaus as Chief of the National Guard Bureau
