= Christopher P. Weggeman =

United States Air Force officer

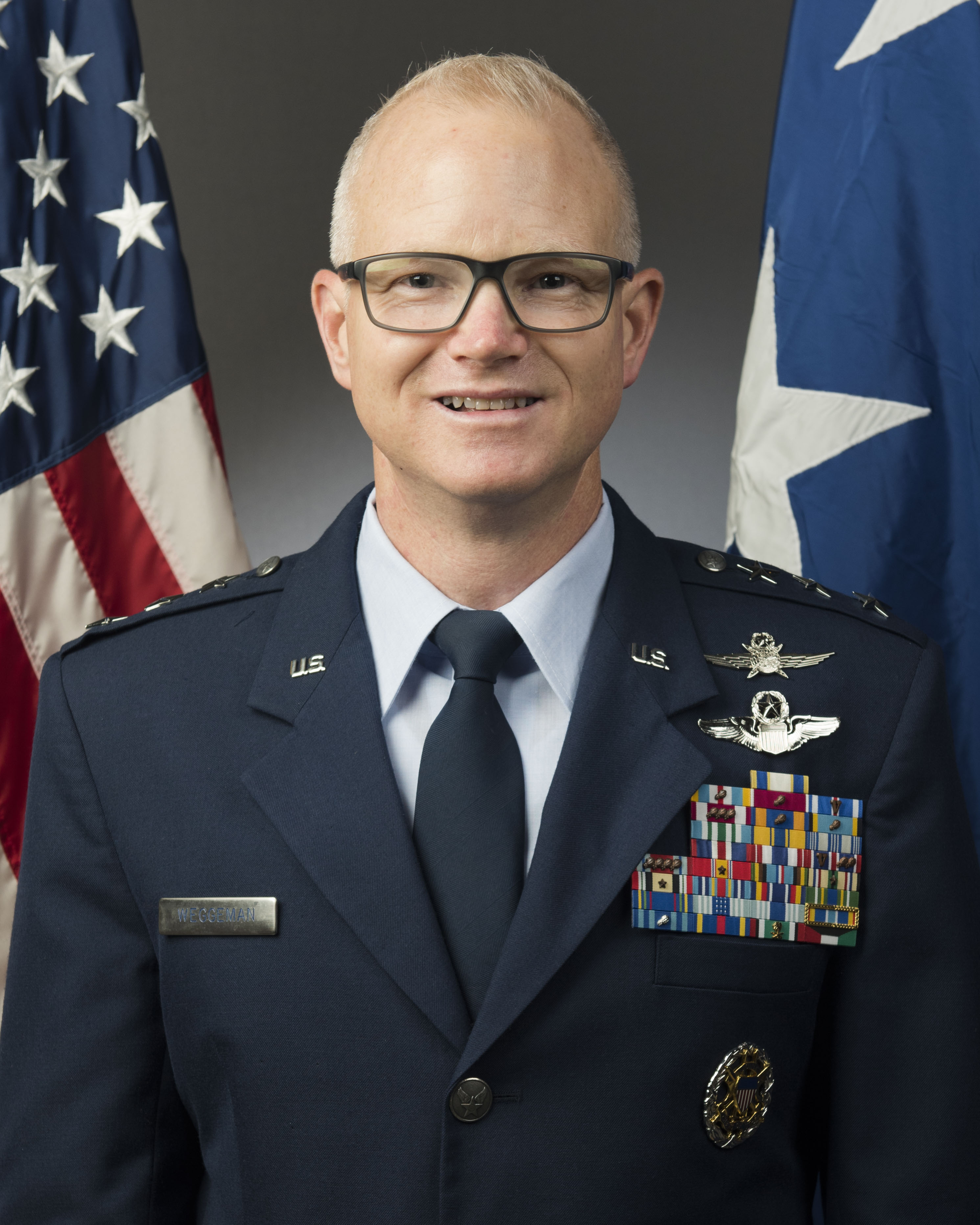
- Official portrait, 2018
- Born: 1965 (age 60–61)
- Military career
- Allegiance: United States
- Branch: United States Air Force
- Service years: 1987–2021
- Rank: Lieutenant General
- Commands: Twenty-Fourth Air Force; 52nd Fighter Wing; 12th Operations Group; 421st Fighter Squadron
- Conflicts: Gulf War; Iraq War
- Awards: Air Force Distinguished Service Medal; Defense Superior Service Medal (3); Legion of Merit (2); Distinguished Flying Cross w/ Valor "V"

Christopher P. Weggeman (born 1965) is a retired lieutenant general in the United States Air Force who last served as deputy commander of Air Combat Command from 2018 to 2021. He was commissioned through the ROTC program at Purdue University in 1987.

== Awards and decorations ==
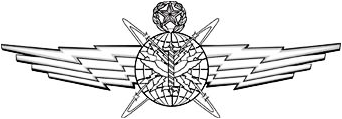
Master Cyberspace Operator Badge
US Air Force Command Pilot Badge
Basic Parachutist Badge
Joint Chiefs of Staff Badge

Air Force Distinguished Service Medal
Defense Superior Service Medal with two bronze oak leaf clusters
Legion of Merit with oak leaf cluster
Distinguished Flying Cross with Valor device
Meritorious Service Medal with three oak leaf clusters
Air Medal with oak leaf cluster
Aerial Achievement Medal with oak leaf cluster
Joint Service Commendation Medal
Air Force Commendation Medal
Air Force Achievement Medal
Gallant Unit Citation
Air Force Meritorious Unit Award
Air Force Outstanding Unit Award with "V" device and two oak leaf clusters
Combat Readiness Medal with four oak leaf clusters
National Defense Service Medal with one bronze service star
Armed Forces Expeditionary Medal
Southwest Asia Service Medal with service star
Iraq Campaign Medal with service star
Global War on Terrorism Expeditionary Medal
Global War on Terrorism Service Medal
Korea Defense Service Medal
Nuclear Deterrence Operations Service Medal
Air Force Overseas Short Tour Service Ribbon
Air Force Overseas Long Tour Service Ribbon
Air Force Expeditionary Service Ribbon with gold frame
Air Force Longevity Service Award with one silver and two bronze oak leaf clusters
Air Force Training Ribbon
Kuwait Liberation Medal (Saudi Arabia)
Kuwait Liberation Medal (Kuwait)

== Effective dates of promotions ==
Rank	Date
Second Lieutenant	August 13, 1987
First Lieutenant	August 13, 1989
Captain	August 13, 1991
Major	September 1, 1997
Lieutenant Colonel	May 1, 2000
Colonel	February 1, 2006
Brigadier General	June 5, 2012
Major General	June 24, 2016
Lieutenant General	August 21, 2018

Military offices
Preceded by Lee T. Wight	Commander of the 52nd Fighter Wing; 2010–2012	Succeeded by David Julazadeh
Preceded by ???	Deputy Director of Command, Control, Communications, and Computers/Cyber of the Joint Staff; 2012–2014	Succeeded by Mark E. Weatherington
Preceded by Joseph A. Brendler	Director for Plans and Policy of the United States Cyber Command; 2015–2016	Succeeded by Kevin Kovacich
Preceded by B. Edwin Wilson	Commander of the Twenty-Fourth Air Force; 2016–2018	Succeeded by Robert J. Skinner
Preceded by John K. McMullen	Deputy Commander of the Air Combat Command; 2018–2021	Succeeded by Russell L. Mack
