= J. Gregory Pavlovich =

United States Air Force general

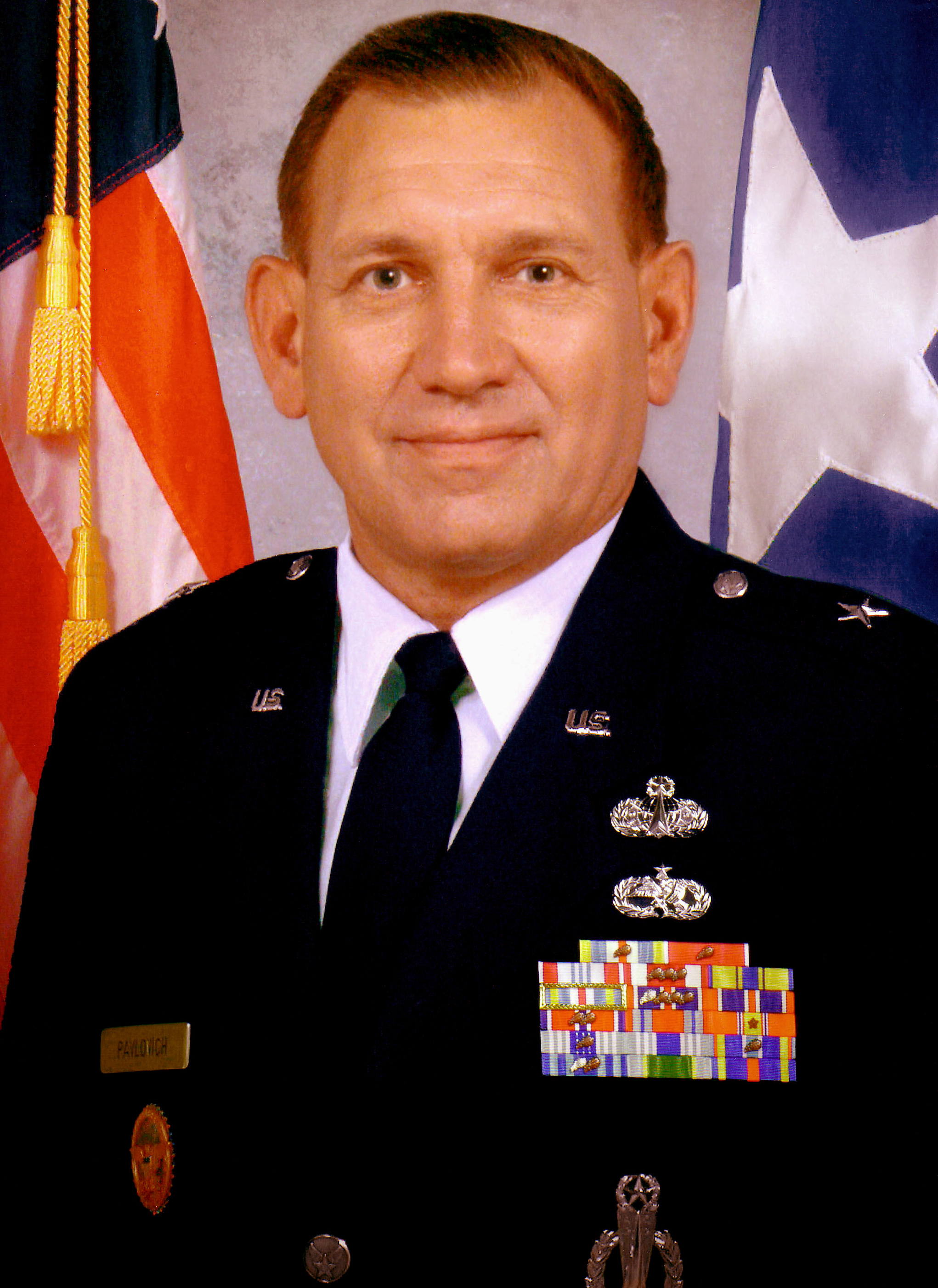
- Military career
- Allegiance: United States
- Branch: United States Air Force
- Service years: 1975–2005
- Rank: Brigadier General
- Commands: Commander, 45th Space Wing
- Awards: Legion of Merit

J. Gregory Pavlovich is a former brigadier general in the United States Air Force he joined in 1975 and retired in 2005. After being assigned to units within Europe (such as the 485th Tactical Missile Wing and RAF Mildenhall) he returned to the United States, and became executive program director in the Office of the Inspector General, U.S. Department of Defense. In 1994, he was named chief of strategic planning and business process integration at the Defense Logistics Agency. The following year, he became assistant executive director of the Readiness Group. In 1998, he became the vice commander of the 341st Space Wing. He assumed command of the wing later that year. In 2000, he was assigned to Air Force Space Command as deputy director of operations. He became commander of the 45th Space Wing at Patrick Air Force Base.

== Career ==
From 1975 to 1980, Pavlovich was assigned to the 341st Strategic Missile Wing at Malmstrom Air Force Base. He was then assigned to Strategic Air Command from 1981 to 1984 and Vandenberg Air Force Base from 1984 to 1986.

In 1986, Pavlovich was transferred to the 485th Tactical Missile Wing at Florennes Air Base in Belgium. From there, he became a squadron commander at RAF Mildenhall.

After returning to the United States, Pavlovich became executive program director in the Office of the Inspector General, U.S. Department of Defense. In 1994, he was named chief of strategic planning and business process integration at the Defense Logistics Agency. The following year, he became assistant executive director of the Readiness Group.

In 1998, he returned to Malmstrom Air Force Base as vice commander of the 341st Space Wing. He assumed command of the wing later that year. In 2000, he was assigned to Air Force Space Command as deputy director of operations. He became commander of the 45th Space Wing at Patrick Air Force Base in 2002 before retiring in 2005.

Awards he received include the Defense Superior Service Medal with oak leaf cluster, the Legion of Merit with oak leaf cluster, the Defense Meritorious Service Medal, the Meritorious Service Medal with three oak leaf cluster, the Air Force Commendation Medal, the Joint Meritorious Unit Award, the Outstanding Unit Award with silver oak leaf cluster and four bronze oak leaf clusters and the Combat Readiness Medal.
