= John K. McMullen =

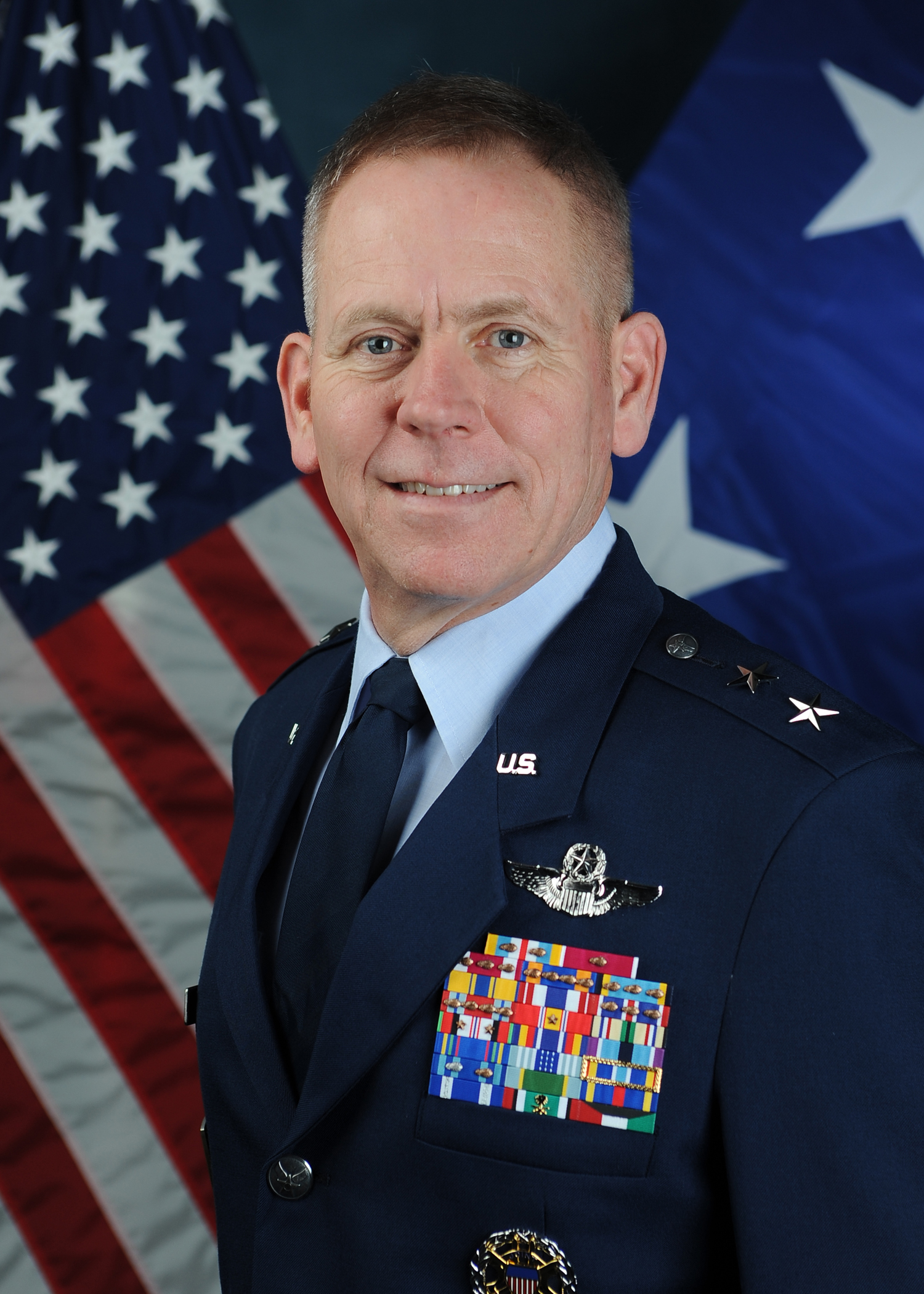
- McMullen in uniform, 2017
- Military career
- Allegiance: United States
- Branch: U.S. Air Force
- Service years: 1988-2018
- Rank: Major General
- Unit: Deputy commander of Air Combat Command
- Commands: 366th Operations Group; 493rd Fighter Squadron

John K. McMullen is an officer of the United States Air Force.

He was the Commander, 9th Air and Space Expeditionary Task Force - Afghanistan, Commander, NATO Air Command-Afghanistan, and the Deputy Commander-Air, U.S. Forces- Afghanistan. In that triple-hatted role, he oversaw two NATO aerial ports of debarkation, two air expeditionary wings and two expeditionary groups consisting of more than 6,900 Airmen. He also advised and assisted with joint expeditionary tasked/individual augmentee taskings in the Afghanistan/Pakistan area and ensured the optimal integration of air and space power in support of Headquarters International Security Assistance Force and Operation Enduring Freedom missions. As the Commander, NATO Air Command-Afghanistan, he was responsible for developing the Afghan Air Force.

In addition to these three command functions, Major General McMullen served as the Central Command Combined Forces Air Component Commander's personal representative to the ISAF Commander as the Air Component Coordination Element liaison and also serves on the ISAF Joint Command staff as the Deputy Chief of Staff-Air.

== Background ==
Major General McMullen received his Air Force commission in March 1988 through Officer Training School. He is a distinguished graduate of the United States Air Force Fighter Weapons School, Nellis Air Force Base, Nevada, and also served as one of the school's instructor pilots. During his career, he has commanded a fighter squadron and served as the chief of combat plans and chief of safety. He is a command pilot with more than 2,700 hours in the F-15C and F-22.

== Flight information ==
- Rating: command pilot
- Flight hours: more than 2,700
- Aircraft flown: F-15C, F-22

== Education ==
- 1985 Bachelor of Science degree, aerospace engineering, Virginia Polytechnic Institute and State University
- 1986 Master of Science degree, aerospace engineering, Virginia Polytechnic Institute and State University
- 1995 Squadron Officer School, Maxwell Air Force Base, Alabama
- 2000 Air Command and Staff College, in residence
- 2001 School of Advanced Airpower Studies, Maxwell Air Force Base, Alabama
- 2006 National War College, Fort McNair, Washington D.C.

== Assignments ==
1. April 1988 - May 1989, student, undergraduate pilot training, Reese Air Force Base, Texas
2. May 1989 - July 1989, student, lead-in fighter training, Holloman Air Force Base, N.M.
3. August 1989 - January 1990, student, F-15C initial qualification training, Tyndall Air Force Base, Fla.
4. January 1990 - June 1993, F-15C instructor pilot and mission commander, 27th Tactical Fighter Squadron, Langley Air Force Base, Va.
5. June 1993 - May 1997, F-15C instructor pilot, flight commander, weapons officer, 2nd Fighter Squadron, Tyndall Air Force Base, Fla.
6. June 1997 - July 1999, F-15C WIC instructor pilot, flight commander, F-15C division, Air Force Weapons School, Nellis Air Force Base, Nev.
7. August 1999 - May 2000, student, Air Command and Staff College, Maxwell Air Force Base, Ala.
8. June 2000 - June 2001, student, School of Advanced Airpowers Studies, Maxwell Air Force Base, Ala.
9. July 2001 - September 2002, chief, combat plans, 56th Air Operations Squadron, Headquarters Pacific Air Forces, Hickam Air Force Base, Hawaii
10. September 2002 - December 2002, chief of safety, 48th Fighter Wing, RAF Lakenheath, United Kingdom
11. December 2002 - May 2003, director of operations, 493nd Fighter Squadron, RAF Lakenheath, United Kingdom
12. May 2003 - June 2005, commander, 493rd Fighter Squadron, RAF Lakenheath, United Kingdom
13. June 2005 - August 2006, student, National War College, Fort McNair, Washington, D.C.
14. August 2006–present, commander, 366th Operations Group, Mountain Home Air Force Base, Idaho

== Major awards and decorations ==
- Meritorious Service Medal with three oak leaf clusters
- Air Medal with two oak leaf clusters
- Aerial Achievement Medal with three oak leaf clusters
- Air Force Commendation Medal
- Combat Readiness Medal with one oak leaf cluster
- National Defense Service Medal with one oak leaf cluster
- Southwest Asia Service Medal
- Humanitarian Service Medal
- Kuwait Liberation Medal from the Kingdom of Saudi Arabia
- Kuwait Liberation Medal from the Government of Kuwait

== Effective dates of promotion ==
- Second lieutenant March 18, 1988
- First lieutenant March 18, 1990
- Captain March 18, 1992
- Major August 1, 1998
- Lieutenant colonel May 1, 2001
- Colonel March 1, 2006
- Brigadier General September 2, 2011
- Major General 2014

Military offices
Preceded by ???	Deputy Chief of Staff for Operations of the Allied Air Command; 2012–2014	Succeeded by Thomas F. Gould
Preceded by Kenneth S. Wilsbach	Commander of the 9th Air and Space Expeditionary Task Force-Afghanistan; 2014–2015	Succeeded by Scott D. West
Preceded by Charles Q. Brown Jr.	Director of Operations, Strategic Deterrence, and Nuclear Integration of the United States Air Forces in Europe – Air Forces Africa; 2015–2017	Succeeded by Timothy G. Fay
Preceded by Jerry D. Harris Jr.	Deputy Commander of the Air Combat Command; 2017–2018	Succeeded by Christopher P. Weggeman
