= B. Edwin Wilson =

United States Air Force general

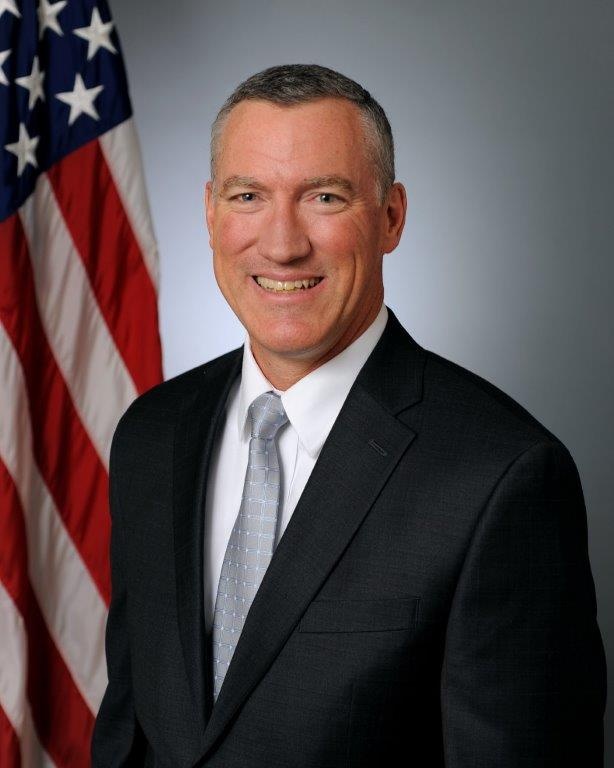
- Mr. B. Edwin Wilson, USAF Major General (Retired)
- Military career
- Allegiance: United States of America
- Branch: United States Air Force
- Service years: 1985–2018
- Rank: Major General
- Nickname: Ed
- Commands: Deputy Assistant Secretary of Defense for Cyber Policy; 24th Air Force; 45th Space Wing; Space Development and Test Wing
- Awards: Air Force Distinguished Service Medal (2); Defense Superior Service Medal (2); Legion of Merit (2); Defense Meritorious Service Medal (3); Meritorious Service Medal (2); Joint Service Commendation Medal (2); Air Force Commendation Medal (2); Air Force Achievement Medal; National Reconnaissance Office’s Distinguished Service Medal; National Reconnaissance Office’s Superior Service Medal
- Other work: Deputy Assistant Secretary of Defense for Cyber Policy

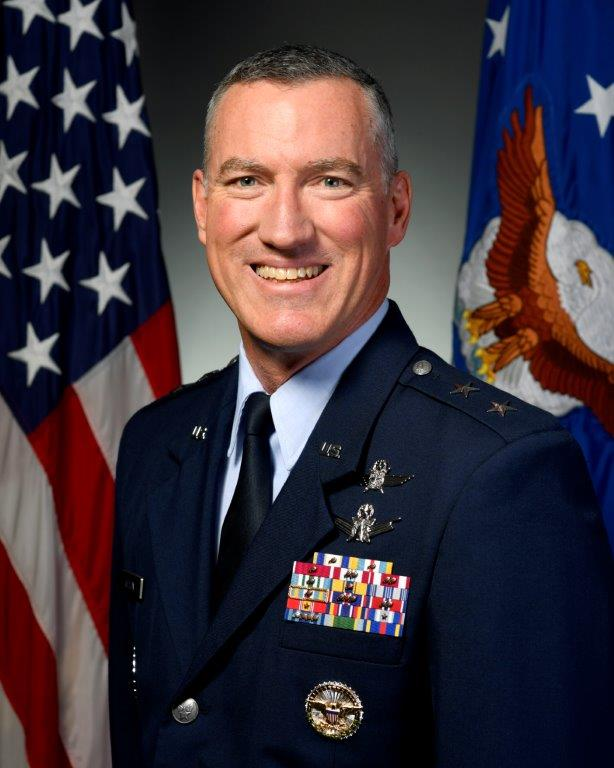
Maj. Gen. Wilson in his Service Uniform

Burke Edwin Wilson is a retired United States Air Force two-star general who served as Commander, 24th Air Force at Joint Base San Antonio-Lackland, Texas from 2014 to 2016.

Wilson entered the Air Force in 1985 through the United States Air Force Academy. He has commanded two space wings and the 24th Air Force. He has served as Deputy Principal Cyber Advisor to the Secretary of Defense and Senior Military Advisor for Cyber, Office of the Under Secretary of Defense for Policy, and as Acting Deputy Assistant Secretary of Defense for Cyber Policy in Washington, District of Columbia.

Since his retirement from the United States Air Force, he currently serves as the Deputy Assistant Secretary of Defense for Cyber Policy.

== Education ==
- 1985 Bachelor of Science degree in electrical engineering, U.S. Air Force Academy, Colorado Springs, Colo.
- 1986 Squadron Officer School, by correspondence
- 1990 Master of Science degree in electrical/computer engineering, Northeastern University, Boston, Mass.
- 1990 Distinguished Graduate, Squadron Officer School, Maxwell AFB, Ala.
- 1998 Air Command and Staff College, Maxwell AFB, Ala.
- 1999 Master of Airpower Art and Science, School of Advanced Airpower Studies, Maxwell AFB, Ala.
- 2004 Air War College, by correspondence
- 2004 Back to Basics, Executive Business Training, Darden Graduate School of Business, University of Virginia, Charlottesville
- 2005 Secretary of Defense Corporate Fellowship, Cisco Systems, San Jose, Calif.
- 2006 Joint Forces Staff College, Norfolk, Va.
- 2009 U.S. Air Force Enterprise Leadership Course, Darden School of Business, University of Virginia, Charlottesville
- 2015 Cyberspace Operations Executive Course, Air University, Maxwell AFB, Ala.

== Assignments ==
- July 1985 – May 1988, design engineer, Space Defense Operations Center; Chief, SPADOC Systems Engineering Branch, Electrical Systems Division, Hanscom AFB, Mass.
- June 1988 – June 1990, Military Strategic and Tactical Relay systems engineer; program manager, MILSTAR Transportable Terminal, Electronic Systems Division, Hanscom AFB, Mass.
- July 1990 – June 1994, Operations Director; Flight Director; Chief, Advanced Satellite Planning Division; Chief, Advanced Satellite Management Division, Operational Detachment 4, Onizuka AFB, Calif.
- July 1994 – December 1995, Mission Director; Chief, Support to Military Operations Division, Overhead Collection Management Center, Fort George G. Meade, Md.
- January 1996 – February 1997, executive officer, Deputy Director, National Reconnaissance Office, Chantilly, Va.
- March 1997 – July 1997, military assistant, Assistant Secretary of the Air Force, the Pentagon, Washington, D.C.
- July 1997 – June 1998, student, Air Command and Staff College, Air University, Maxwell AFB, Ala.
- July 1998 – June 1999, student, School of Advanced Airpower Studies, Air University, Maxwell AFB, Ala.
- July 1999 – June 2000, plans and programs officer; Chief, Plans and Programs Branch, U.S. Space Command, Peterson AFB, Colo.
- July 2000 – June 2002, Deputy Director, Commander in Chief's Action Group, North American Aerospace Defense Command/U.S. Space Command, Peterson AFB, Colo.
- July 2002 – July 2003, Commander, 1st Space Operations Squadron, 50th Space Wing, Schriever AFB, Colo.
- July 2003 – July 2004, Deputy Commander, 50th Operations Group, 50th Space Wing, Schriever AFB, Colo.
- August 2004 – May 2005, Secretary of Defense corporate fellow, Cisco Systems, San Jose, Calif.
- June 2005 – June 2006, Director, Commander's Action Group, Air Force Space Command, Peterson AFB, Colo.
- June 2006 – September 2006, student, Joint Forces Staff College, Norfolk, Va.
- September 2006 – April 2008, Commander, Space Operations Group, Aerospace Defense Facility-East, Fort Belvoir, Va.
- April 2008 – February 2010, Commander, Space Development and Test Wing, Kirtland AFB, N.M.
- February 2010 – August 2011, Commander, 45th Space Wing, Patrick AFB, Fla.
- September 2011 – June 2013, Deputy Commander, Air Forces Cyber (AFCYBER/24th Air Force), Fort George G. Meade, Md.
- June 2013 – July 2014, Director of Space Operations, Deputy Chief of Staff for Operations, Plans and Requirements, Headquarters, U.S. Air Force, Washington, D.C.
- July 2014 – June 2016, Commander, 24th Air Force and Commander, Air Forces Cyber, Joint Base San Antonio-Lackland, Texas
- July 2016 – present, Deputy Principal Cyber Advisor to the Secretary of Defense and Senior Military Advisor for Cyber, Office of the Under Secretary of Defense for Policy, The Pentagon, Washington, D.C.
- June 2017 – February 2018, Acting Deputy Assistant Secretary of Defense for Cyber Policy, Washington, D.C.

== Awards and decorations ==
Master Cyberspace Operator Badge
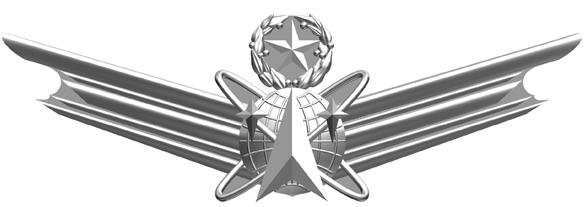
Command Space Operations Badge
Basic Parachutist Badge
Basic Acquisition and Financial Management Badge

| Air Force Distinguished Service Medal with one bronze oak leaf cluster |
| Defense Superior Service Medal with one bronze oak leaf cluster |
| Legion of Merit with one bronze oak leaf cluster |
| Defense Meritorious Service Medal with two bronze oak leaf clusters |
| Meritorious Service Medal with one oak leaf cluster |
| Joint Service Commendation Medal with one oak leaf cluster |
| Air Force Commendation Medal with oak leaf cluster |
| Air Force Achievement Medal |
| National Reconnaissance Office's Distinguished Service Medal (gold medal) |
| National Reconnaissance Office's Superior Service Medal (silver medal) |

== Effective dates of promotion ==
Promotions
| Insignia | Rank | Date |
|---|---|---|
| | Major General | April 2, 2014 |
| | Brigadier General | December 17, 2010 |
| | Colonel | March 1, 2006 |
| | Lieutenant Colonel | May 1, 2001 |
| | Major | January 1, 1997 |
| | Captain | May 28, 1989 |
| | First Lieutenant | May 28, 1987 |
| | Second Lieutenant | May 28, 1985 |

Military offices
| Preceded by James K. McLaughlin | Director of Space Operations of the United States Air Force; 2013–2014 | Succeeded by Martin Whelan |
| Preceded by James K. McLaughlin | Commander of the Twenty-Fourth Air Force; 2014–2016 | Succeeded by Christopher P. Weggeman |
| Preceded by ??? | Senior Military Advisor for Cyber Policy to the Under Secretary of Defense for Policy and the Deputy Principal Cyber Advisor to the United States Secretary of Defense; 2016–2017 | Succeeded by Dennis Crall |
