= United States Space Force =

Space service branch of the U.S. military

- Emblem of the United States Space Force
- Founded: December 20, 2019; (6 years, 10 months)
- Country: United States
- Type: Space force
- Role: Space warfare
- Size: 14,000 military personnel
- Part of: United States Armed Forces; Department of the Air Force
- Headquarters: The Pentagon; Arlington County, Virginia, U.S.
- Mottos: Semper Supra; "Always above"
- March: "Semper Supra"
- Anniversaries: December 20, Founding day.
- Equipment: See spacecraft and space systems
- Engagements: As Air Force Space Command: Grenada – Operation Urgent Fury; Lebanese Civil War; Libya – Operation El Dorado Canyon; Persian Gulf – Operation Ernest Will; Panama – Operation Just Cause; Somalia – Operation United Shield; Haiti – Operation Uphold Democracy; Bosnia and Herzegovina & Croatia – Operation Joint Endeavor; Bosnia and Herzegovina & Croatia – Operation Joint Guard; Bosnia and Herzegovina & Croatia – Operation Joint Endeavor; Bosnia and Herzegovina & Croatia – Operation Joint Forge; Southwest Asia – Operation Vigilant Sentinel; Southwest Asia – Maritime Intercept Operations; Southwest Asia – Operation Southern Watch; Southwest Asia – Operation Northern Watch; Southwest Asia – Operation Desert Fox; Haiti – Operation Secure Tomorrow ; Persian Gulf War; Kosovo Air Campaign; Kosovo Defense Campaign; Iraq Campaign; As U.S. Space Force: Global War on Terrorism; Afghanistan Campaign; Inherent Resolve Campaign
- Website: spaceforce.mil

Commanders
- Commander-in-Chief: President Donald Trump
- Secretary of Defense: Pete Hegseth
- Secretary of the Air Force: Troy Meink
- Chief of Space Operations: Gen Douglas Schiess
- Vice Chief of Space Operations: Gen Shawn N. Bratton
- Chief Master Sergeant of the Space Force: CMSSF John F. Bentivegna

Insignia
- Flag

- Logo

- Seal

- Emblem

The United States Space Force (USSF) is the space service branch of the United States Armed Forces. It was established on December 20, 2019 as part of the United States Department of Defense. It is one of the six armed forces and one of the eight uniformed services of the United States. It is the second independent space force to have been formed, after the Russian Space Forces; together with that of China, it is one of three still extant. (Note: The Russian force is no longer a standalone space force, having been combined with the formerly standalone Russian Air Force in 2015, forming the collective Russian Aerospace Forces.)

The United States Space Force traces its origins to the Air Force, Army, and Navy's military space programs created during the beginning of the Cold War. U.S. military space forces first participated in combat operations during the Vietnam War and have participated in every U.S. military operation since, including the Gulf War, which has been referred to as the "first space war". The Strategic Defense Initiative and creation of Air Force Space Command in the 1980s marked a renaissance for military space operations.

Proposals for a U.S. Space Force were seriously considered during the Reagan administration (1981–89) as part of the Strategic Defense Initiative. The National Space Council, established in 1989, began discussing plans for a Space Corps or Space Force, but these plans were suspended shortly after President Clinton came into office. These discussions were revisited in the late 2010s in response to Russian and Chinese military space developments. The Space Force was officially established on December 20, 2019 during the first Trump administration.

The Space Force is organized as part of the Department of the Air Force alongside the U.S. Air Force, a coequal service. The Department of the Air Force is headed by the civilian secretary of the Air Force, while the U.S. Space Force is led by the chief of space operations. The U.S. Space Force status as part of the Department of the Air Force is intended as an interim measure toward a fully independent Department of the Space Force, led by a civilian secretary of the Space Force.

== Mission ==
The Space Force's statutory responsibilities are outlined in 10 U.S.C. § 9081 and originally introduced in the United States Space Force Act, the Space Force is organized, trained, and equipped to:

1. Provide freedom of operation for the United States in, from, and to space;
2. Conduct space operations; and
3. Protect the interests of the United States in space.

The Department of Defense further defines the specified functions of the Space Force to:

1. Provide freedom of operation for the United States in, from, and to space.
2. Provide prompt and sustained space operations.
3. Protect the interests of the United States in space.
4. Deter aggression in, from, and to space.
5. Conduct space operations.

The Space Force further breaks down its mission into three core functions, which align directly to its mission statement to "secure our Nation's interests in, from, and to space:"

1. Space superiority (in space)
2. Global mission operations (from space)
3. Assured space access (to space)

=== Space superiority ===
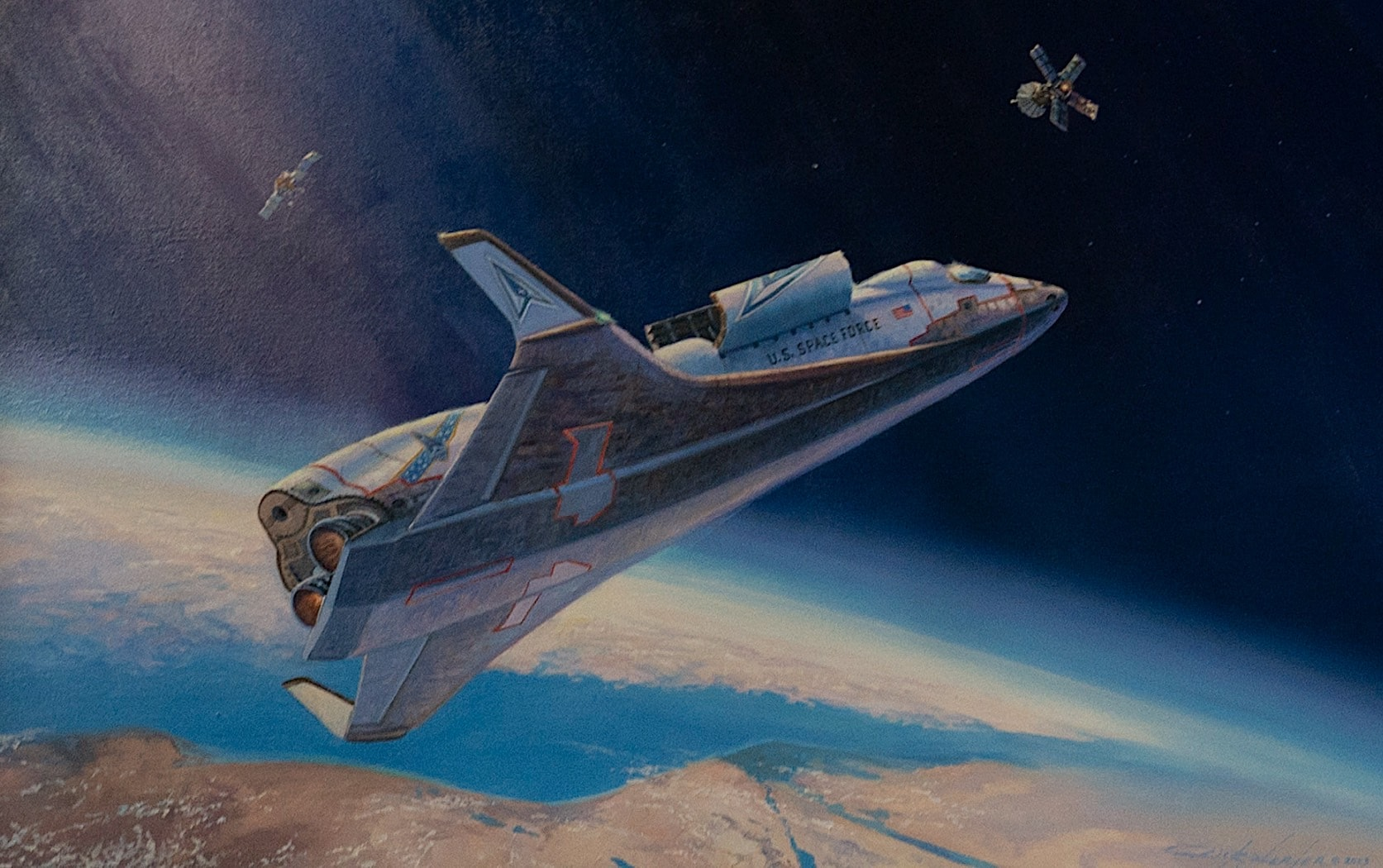
Concept of a future space interception

Space superiority defends against space and counterspace threats by protecting spacecraft in space or protecting against attacks enabled by adversary spacecraft, requiring that the Space Force establish control of the domain. The Space Force describes that at a time and place of the United States' choosing it must be able to assure continued use of spacecraft and deny adversaries use of their spacecraft or space-enabled capabilities.

Missions that support space superiority include orbital warfare, electromagnetic warfare, and space battle management.

=== Global mission operations ===
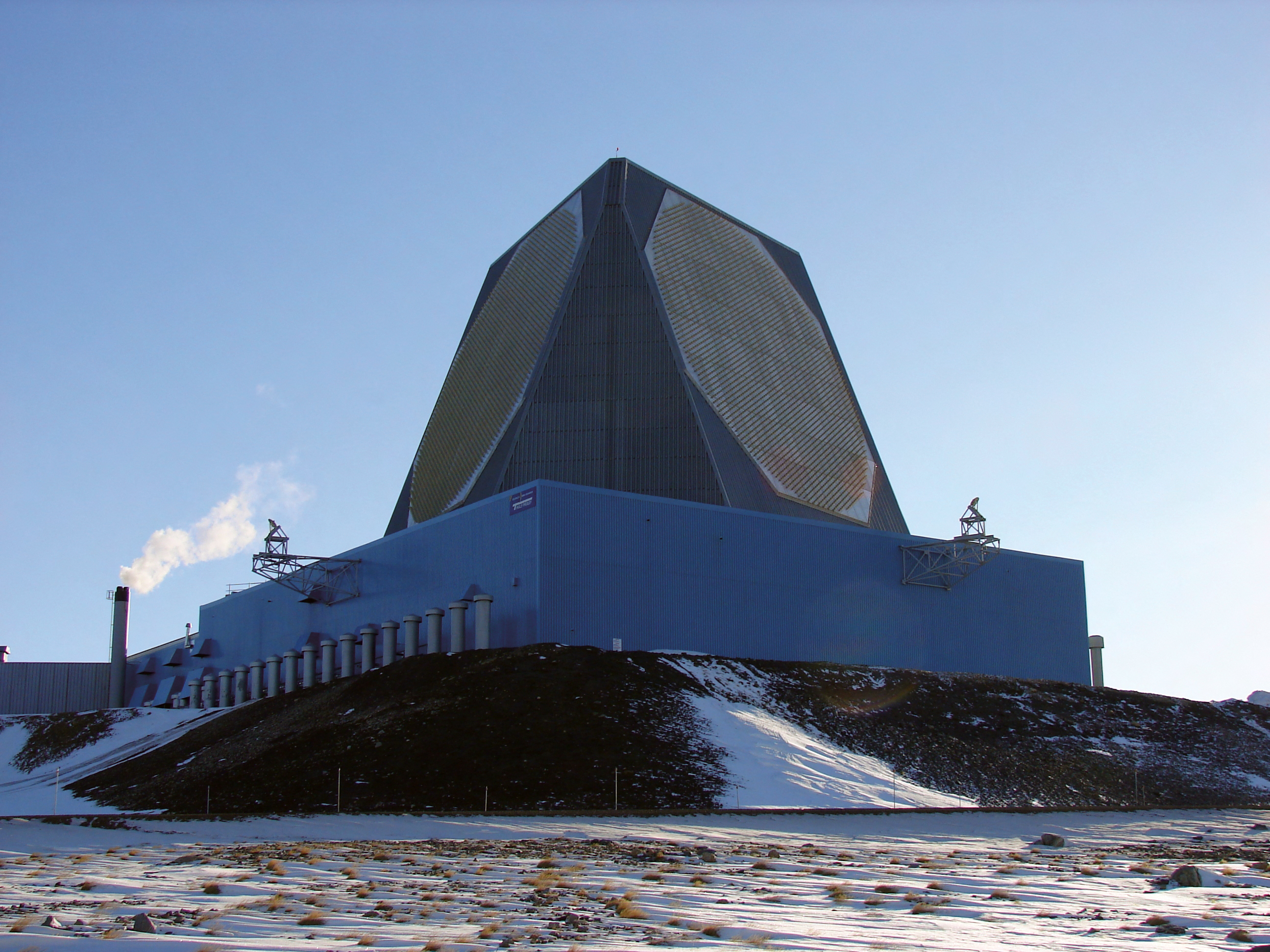
Missile warning radar at Pituffik Space Base, Greenland

Global mission operations integrates joint functions across all domains (land, air, maritime, space, cyberspace) on a global space. Through space, the U.S. military and its allies can see, communicate, and navigate. Global mission operations also protect U.S. forces on Earth through early warning of incoming missiles and other types of attack. The Space Force describes global mission operations as allowing the rest of the U.S. military to defend the air, land, and sea.

Missions that support global mission operations include missile warning, satellite communications, and positioning, navigation, and timing.

=== Assured space access ===
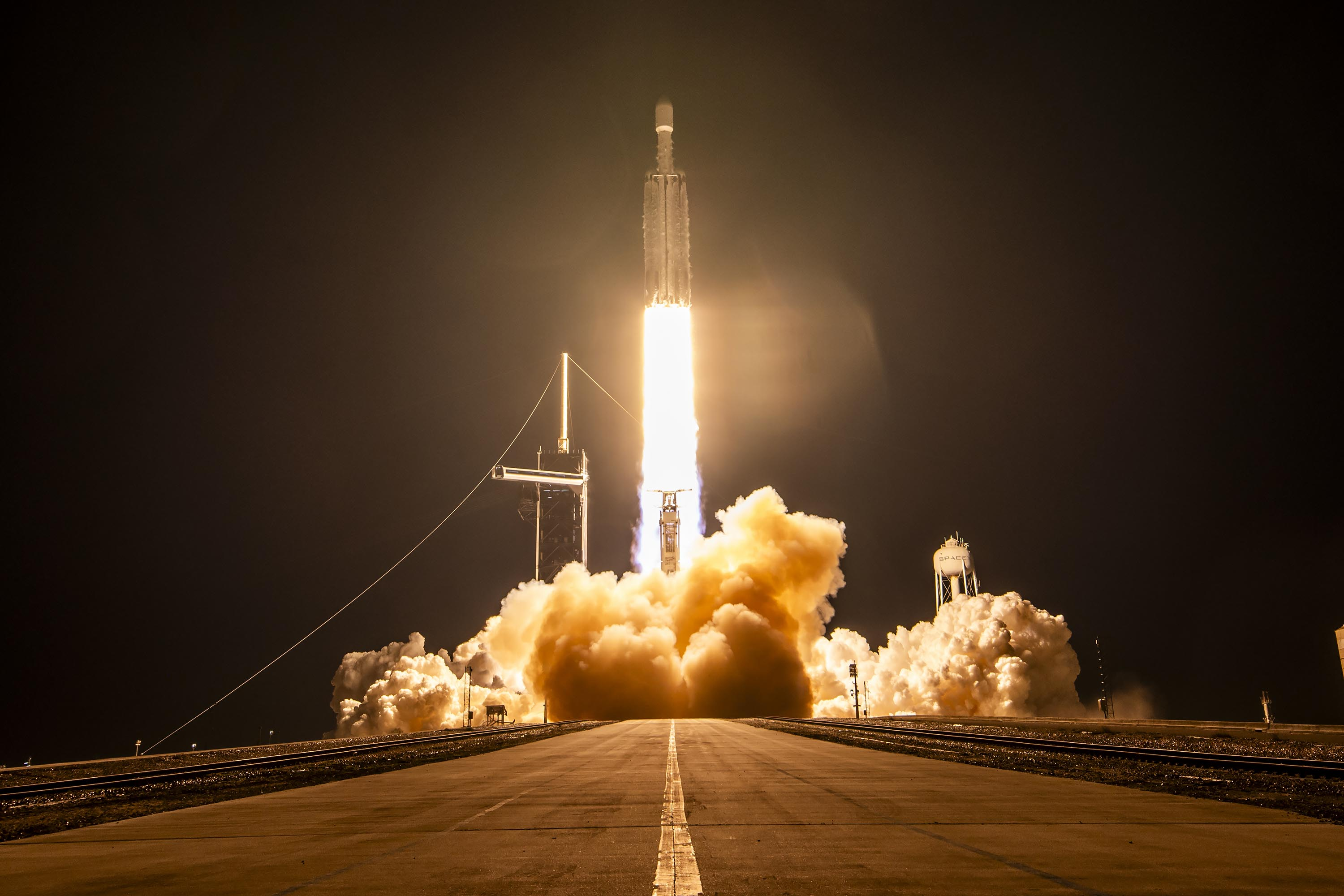
USSF Falcon Heavy launch from Kennedy Space Center

Assured space access ensures that the Space Force can deploy and sustain equipment in outer space. This includes space launches as well as controlling and steering spacecraft out of the way of oncoming space debris to avoid collisions. The Space Force describes assured access to space as being able to make sure it can continue launching and conducting space operations 24/7.

Missions supporting space access include launch, range control, cyber, and space domain awareness.

== History ==
=== The Defense Department enters space ===
In the long haul, our safety as a nation may depend upon achieving "space superiority." Several decades from now, the important battles may not be sea battles or air battles, but space battles, and we should be spending a certain fraction of our national resources to ensure that we do not lag in obtaining space supremacy.

— Major General Bernard Schriever, February 19, 1957

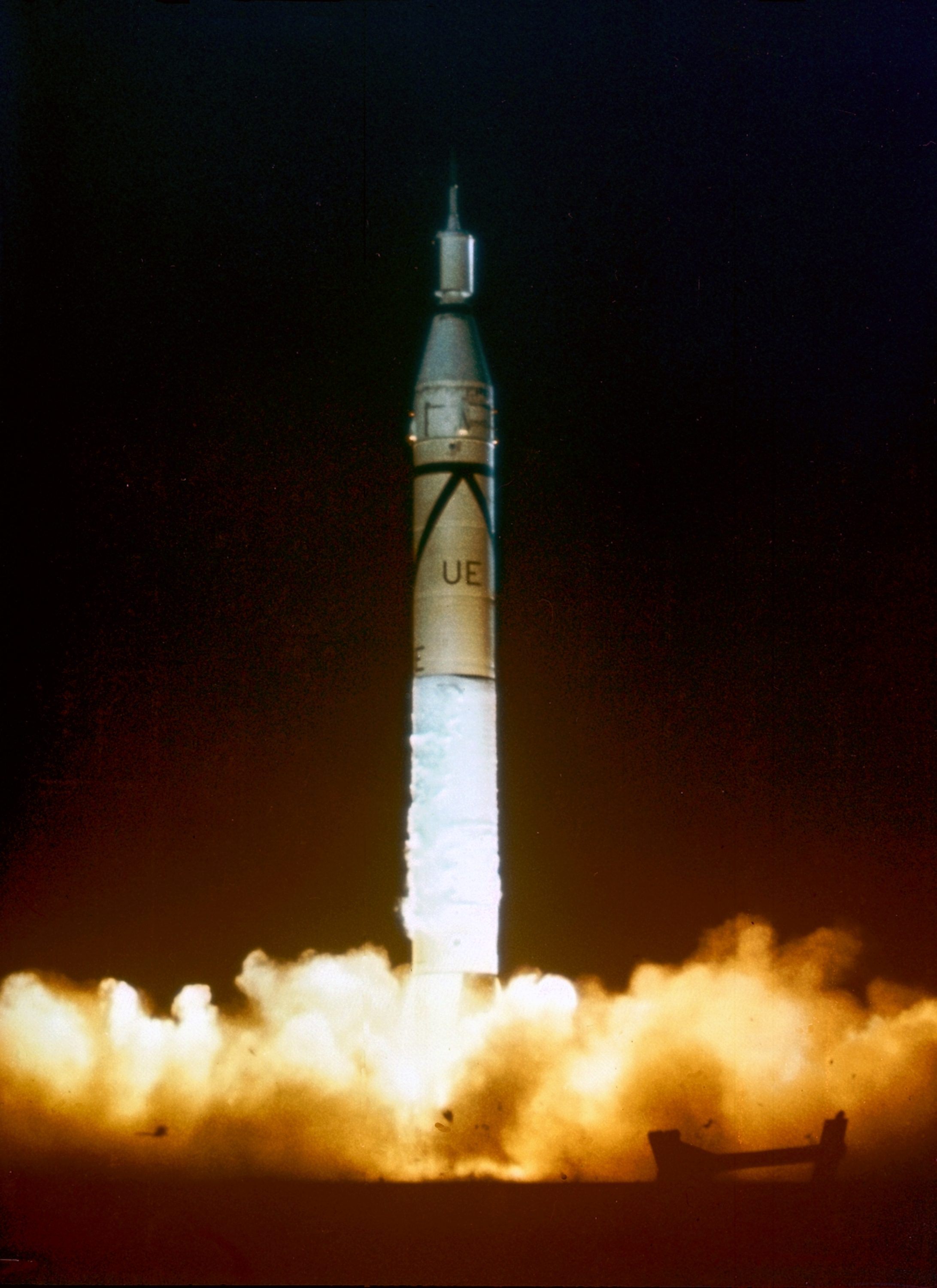
Launch of Explorer 1, America's first satellite, by the U.S. Army (1958)

In the aftermath of World War II the Air Force started examining the potentials and risks of space. General Henry H. Arnold, commander of the Army Air Forces, tasked General Bernard Schriever to identify and develop technologies, with the scientific community, that could be beneficial for the new U.S. Air Force in the next global conflict. Identifying the importance of space, the U.S. Army, U.S. Navy, and U.S. Air Force each started their own separate space and rocket programs. The U.S. Air Force created the first military space organization in the world, establishing the Western Development Division in 1954 and placing it under the command of General Schriever. The Army followed a year later, creating the Army Ballistic Missile Agency under the leadership of General John Bruce Medaris and Wernher von Braun.

The Army led the United States into space, launching the first American spacecraft, Explorer 1, on 31 January 1958. Space exploration continued to be a military responsibility until the National Aeronautics and Space Administration was created later that year. The military shifted from conducting their own space exploration programs to supporting NASA's, providing the agency with its astronauts and space launch vehicles, while also conducting astronaut recovery and supporting space launches from the Air Force's Eastern Range.

The Air Force was recognized as the lead military service for space by the early 1960s, with the Army and Navy operating in supporting roles. Early military space efforts were focused on developing and fielding spacecraft to accomplish national objectives, with a focus on weather, reconnaissance and surveillance, communications, and navigation. On August 18, 1961, the Air Force and National Reconnaissance Office launched the first CORONA reconnaissance mission, recovering 3,000 feet (910 m) of film from space and imaging 1.65 million square miles (4,300,000 km^{2}) of the Soviet Union's territory.

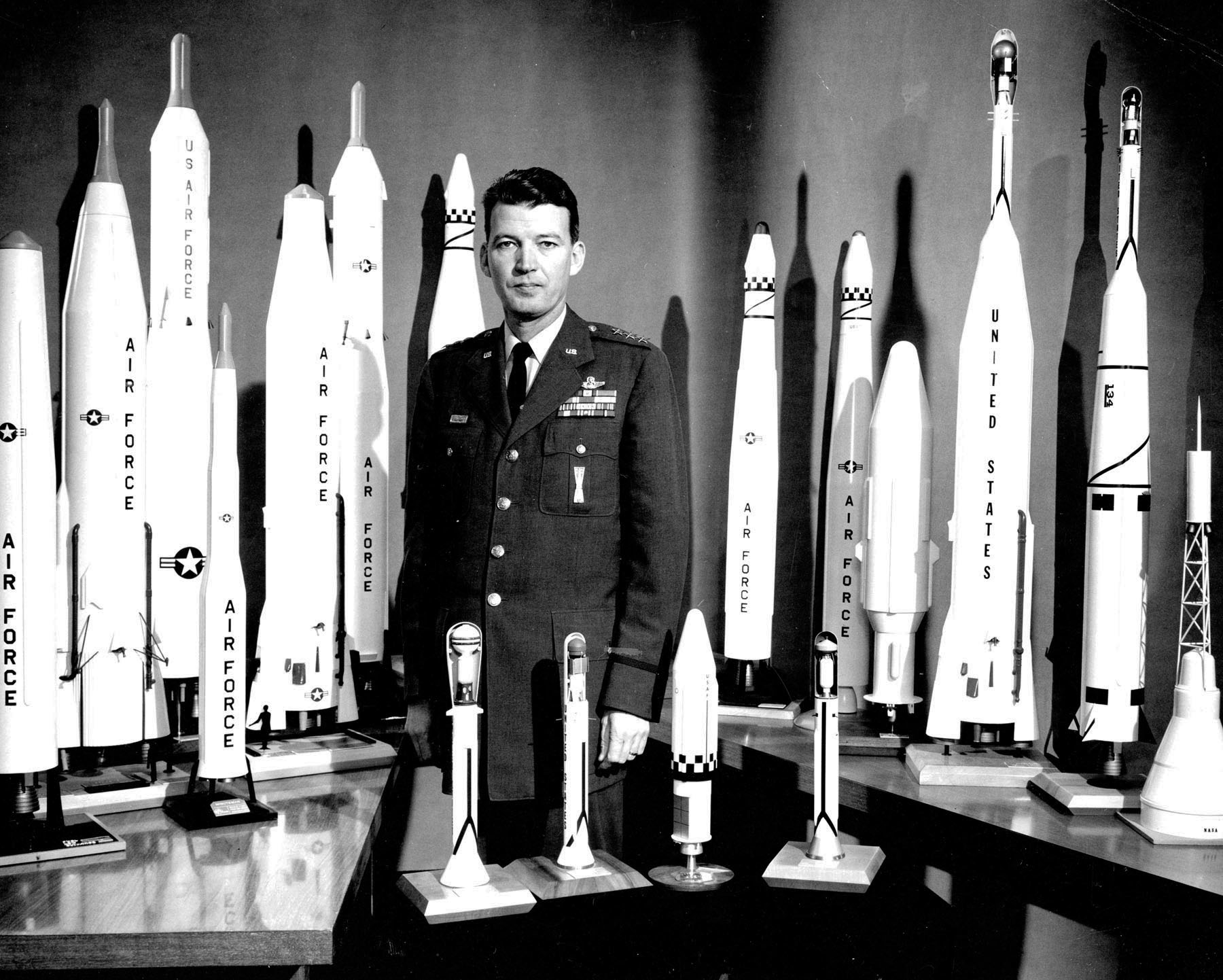
General Bernard Schriever, father of the Air Force space and missile program

Concerned about the development of the Soviet Union's own space forces, the Air Force advocated for a military human spaceflight program. General Curtis LeMay described strong parallels between World War I aviation and 1960s space operations, noting how quickly flying evolved from chivalric and unarmed reconnaissance flights to combat efforts designed to destroy enemy air superiority. General LeMay believed that it was naive to believe that the same trends were not expected to be seen in space and must be prepared for. Although the Air Force made significant progress in developing the X-20 spaceplane, Manned Orbiting Laboratory, and Blue Gemini, opposition from the Department of Defense prevented operational fielding.

In November 1968, the Central Intelligence Agency reported a successful satellite destruction simulation performed by the Soviet Union as a part of its Istrebitel Sputnikov anti-satellite weapons research programme. Possibly as a response to the Soviet programme, the United States had earlier began Project SAINT, which was intended to provide anti-satellite capability to be used in the case of war with the Soviet Union. However, the project was canceled early on due to budget constraints and after details were leaked to The New York Times in 1962. Despite these setbacks, the Air Force did successfully field the Program 437 anti-satellite weapon system, which used nuclear Thor missiles to intercept and destroy enemy spacecraft.

Although most military space forces were organized under the Air Force, they were still fragmented within several different major commands. Recognizing rapid growth of space forces and the need to centralize them under one command, the Air Force established Air Force Space Command in 1982. This was followed by the establishment of the joint United States Space Command in 1985, aligning Air Force Space Command, Naval Space Command, and Army Space Command under a single operational commander. These two moves, along with the Strategic Defense Initiative's establishment by President Ronald Reagan, led to a renaissance of military space operations in the 1980s.

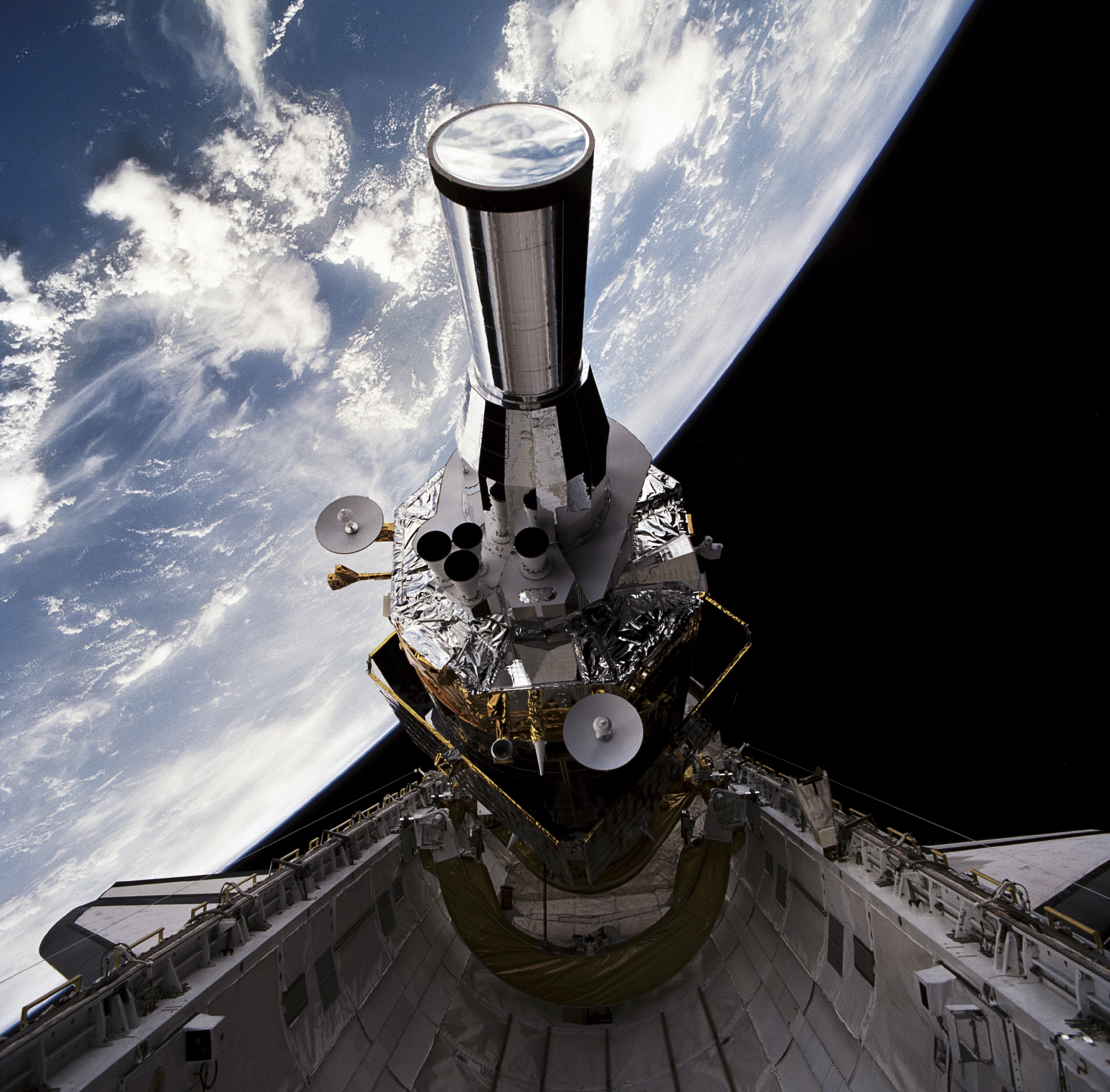
Air Force Defense Support Program deployment from the Space Shuttle Atlantis on the STS-44 mission (1991)

Space forces were first used in combat operations during the Vietnam War, with Air Force weather and communications spacecraft supporting ground, sea, and air operations. During Operation Urgent Fury in Grenada, satellite communications were used to conduct command and control for the first time, while Operation El Dorado Canyon and Operation Just Cause marked the first time that major U.S. forces incorporated information from space-based intelligence systems.

The Persian Gulf War marked the first time that military space forces were unleashed to their fullest extent. Over sixty spacecraft provided 90% of theater communications and command and control for a multinational army of 500,000 troops, weather support for commanders and mission planners, missile warning of Iraqi Scud missile launches, and satellite navigation for air and land forces moving across a featureless desert. The decisive role that space forces played directly enabled an overwhelming Coalition victory and led to the Persian Gulf War being coined "the first Space War."

While U.S. space forces supported all U.S. military operations in the 1990s, Operation Allied Force marked the first use of Global Positioning System-aided munitions in a conflict, ushering in a new era of precision bombing. Following the September 11 attacks, U.S. space forces mobilized to respond as part of the Global War on Terrorism, Operation Enduring Freedom, Operation Iraqi Freedom, and Operation Inherent Resolve.

=== Path to a separate space service ===
Creating a new military service...would be a dramatic step. Perhaps a "Space Corps" would be a step toward a Space Force. Maybe the Air Force will preempt these dramatic changes by truly becoming the "Space and Air Force."

— Senator Bob Smith, November 18, 1998

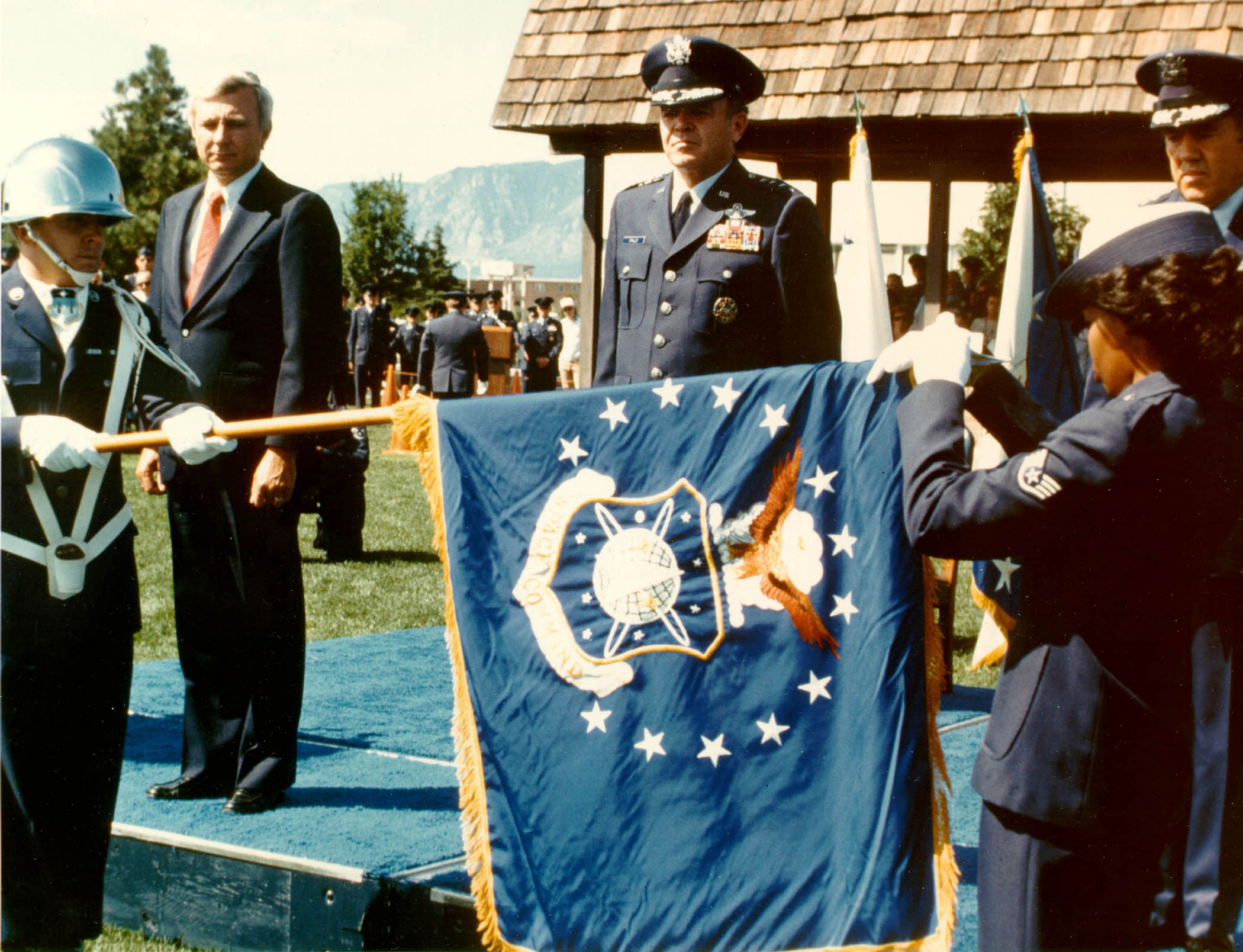
Air Force Space Command activation ceremony in 1982

The idea of a separate service for space originated in the 1960s. Military space activities were briefly consolidated under the Advanced Research Projects Agency in 1958, loosely centralizing space activities under a single organization. The Air Force, Army, and Navy feared that it would evolve into a "fourth service" for space, before authorities were returned to the service.

The first direct call for a U.S. Space Force occurred in 1982, prior to Air Force Space Command's establishment or the Strategic Defense Initiative's public announcement. As part of a report recommending the acceleration U.S. space-based laser weapon development, the Government Accountability Office recommended the U.S. Air Force be reorganized as the U.S. Aerospace Force or that an independent U.S. Space Force be created. Ultimately, a congressional proposal to rename the U.S. Air Force as the U.S. Aerospace Force and speculation that President Ronald Reagan may announce the creation of a U.S. Space Force accelerated Air Force plans to create a space command within the service.

Following the Persian Gulf War, the Air Force and Defense Department declared that "space power has now become as important to the nation as land, sea, and air power." Despite this public pronouncement, a growing section of Congress believed that space was being shortchanged and used only as an auxiliary to air operations. In 1998, drawing parallels between the challenges faced by post-World War I Army Aviators and post–Gulf War Air Force space operators, Senator Bob Smith publicly called for the establishment of a Space Force if the Air Force could not, or would not, embrace spacepower. An independent Department of the Space Force would ensure that space got its fair share of resources within the Defense Department, with Senator Smith calling for the creation of a Space Corps within the Department of the Air Force as a bridge to a fully independent Space Force.

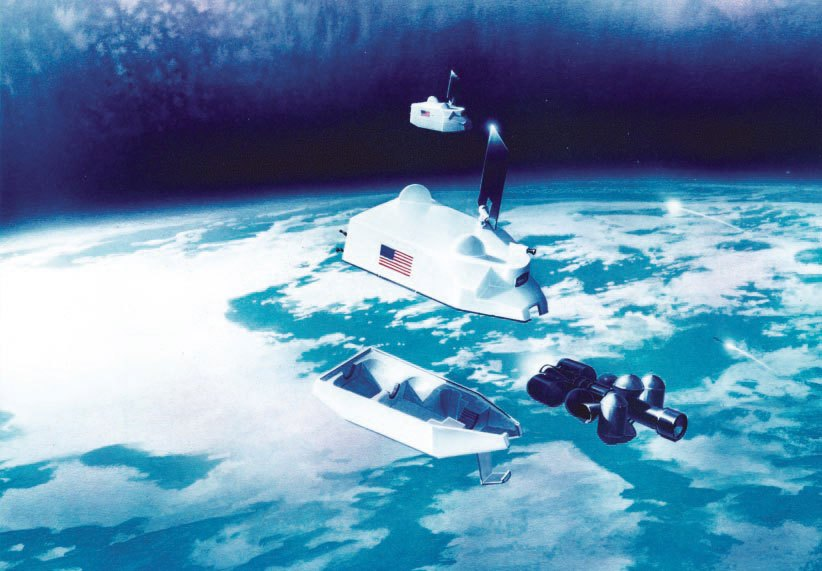
Concept for the Strategic Defense Initiative Brilliant Pebbles space-based interceptor

In 2000, Senator Smith led Congress in establishing a commission to examine the organization and management of national security space. The commission to Assess United States National Security Space Management and Organization, better known as the 2001 Space Commission or the Rumsfeld Commission, released its report in 2001. The Rumsfeld Commission noted the strong risk of a "Space Pearl Harbor," harking back to Imperial Japan's surprise attack on the U.S. Pacific Fleet in 1941. It was extremely critical of the Air Force's treatment of space, with few witnesses expressing confidence that the Air Force would address the requirement to provide space capabilities to the other services or move beyond treating space as just a support capability for air operations. The most significant recommendation of the Rumsfeld Commission was the creation of a Space Corps within the Department of the Air Force in the mid-term, which would evolve into a Department of the Space Force in the long-term. The Rumsfeld Commission expected the transition from Air Force Space Command to a fully independent Space Force to occur in between 2006 and 2011.

Air Force leadership reacted extremely poorly to the Rumsfeld Commission's recommendations. The day after the commission was publicly released Air Force chief of staff General Michael E. Ryan declared "an independent Space Force or Corps was not warranted for at least another 50 years." General Ryan doubled down over the following year, stating that a Space Force should only be considered once space operations moved beyond Earth orbit. Despite the Air Force's hostility to the idea of a Space Corps or Space Force, they did meet some recommendations by transferring the Space and Missile Systems Center from Air Force Materiel Command to Air Force Space Command and establishing the National Security Space Institute. Ultimately, the Rumsfeld Commission's recommendations remained unfulfilled because of the higher priority placed on counterterrorism after the September 11 attacks, canceling plans for a Space Corps within the Department of the Air Force or a fully independent Space Force by 2011.

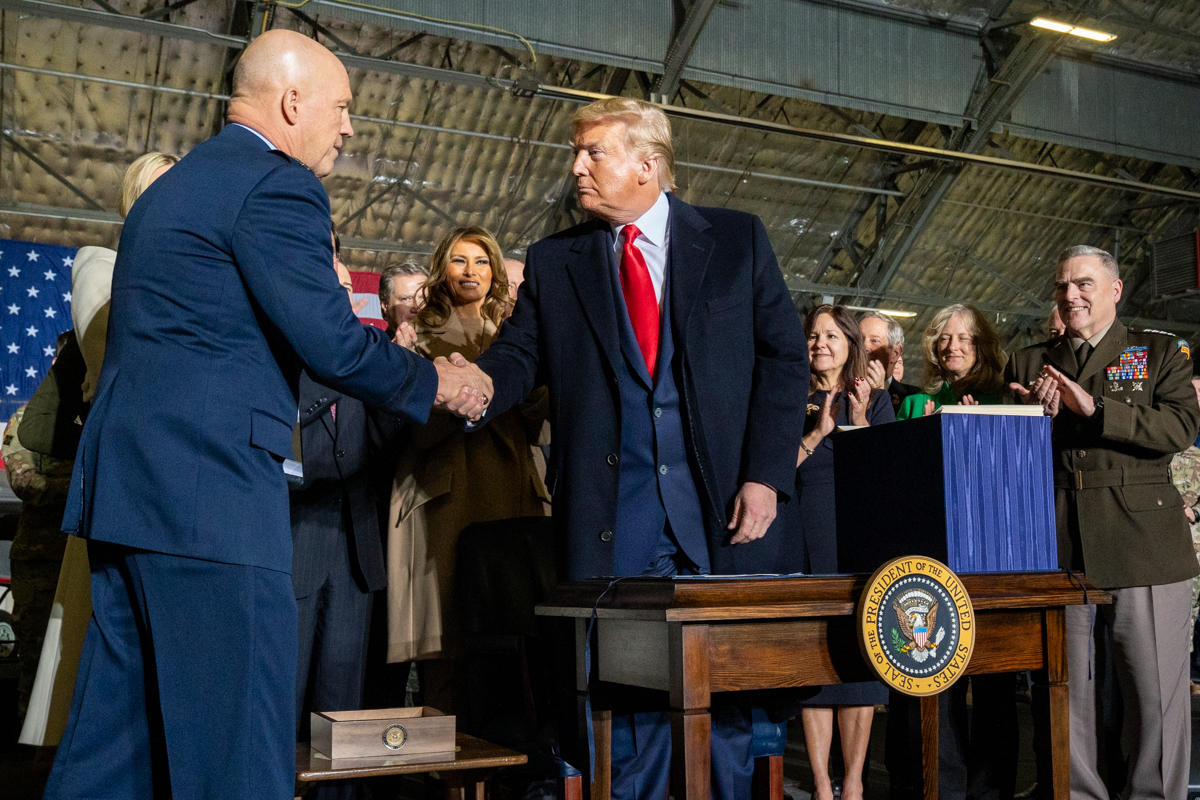
President Donald Trump congratulating General Jay Raymond after signing the 2020 NDAA that established the U.S. Space Force

While the United States' focus shifted from space to counterterrorism, the Russian Armed Forces and Chinese People's Liberation Army realized the military benefits that could be gleaned from space, as well as the incredible reliance the United States put on its space forces. Throughout the 2000s, Russian and Chinese space and counterspace capabilities began to increase. In 2001, the Russian Space Forces were reestablished as an independent arm and in 2007, China conducted a destructive anti-satellite missile test causing the single largest space debris generating event in history. In the aftermath of the Chinese ASAT test, Congress tasked the Allard Commission to reevaluate the Defense Department's space organization and management. The Allard Commission noted that the United States' dependence on space had increased, but comparatively little...[had] been achieved to make them more secure." It also noted, despite the recommendations of the Rumsfeld Commission, authority and responsibility for national security space remained fragmented and unfocused. Like the 2001 Rumsfeld Commission, the 2008 Allard Commission recommended establishing a Space Corps within the Department of the Air Force or a separate Department of the Space Force to unify national security space.

It took until 2017 for members of Congress to act on the recommendations of the Rumsfeld and Allard commissions to create a Space Corps within the Department of the Air Force. Representatives Mike Rogers and Jim Cooper unveiled a bipartisan proposal to establish a Space Corps within the Department of the Air Force but it experienced significant opposition from the Air Force and Defense Department and failed in the Senate. However, the proposal was resurrected in 2018 when President Donald Trump publicly endorsed the creation of a Space Force and directed the Defense Department to reverse its opposition and develop plans for its establishment. The Trump Administration plan for the U.S. Space Force was outlined in Space Policy Directive-4, initially organizing the U.S. Space Force as part of the Department of the Air Force, but with plans to build out a separate Department of the Space Force in the future. In 2019, Congress passed legislation establishing the U.S. Space Force as a military service under the Department of the Air Force. On 20 December 2019, the National Defense Authorization Act was signed into law and the U.S. Space Force was established as the sixth armed service, meeting the Rumsfeld and Allard commissions' recommendations to create a Space Corps within the Department of the Air Force, but still falling short of creating a separate Department of the Space Force.

=== The sixth service ===
We are at the dawn of a new era for our Nation’s Armed Forces. The establishment of the U.S. Space Force is an historic event and a strategic imperative for our Nation. Space has become so important to our way of life, our economy and our national security that we must be prepared as a Nation to protect it from hostile actions.

— Secretary of Defense Mark Esper, December 20, 2019

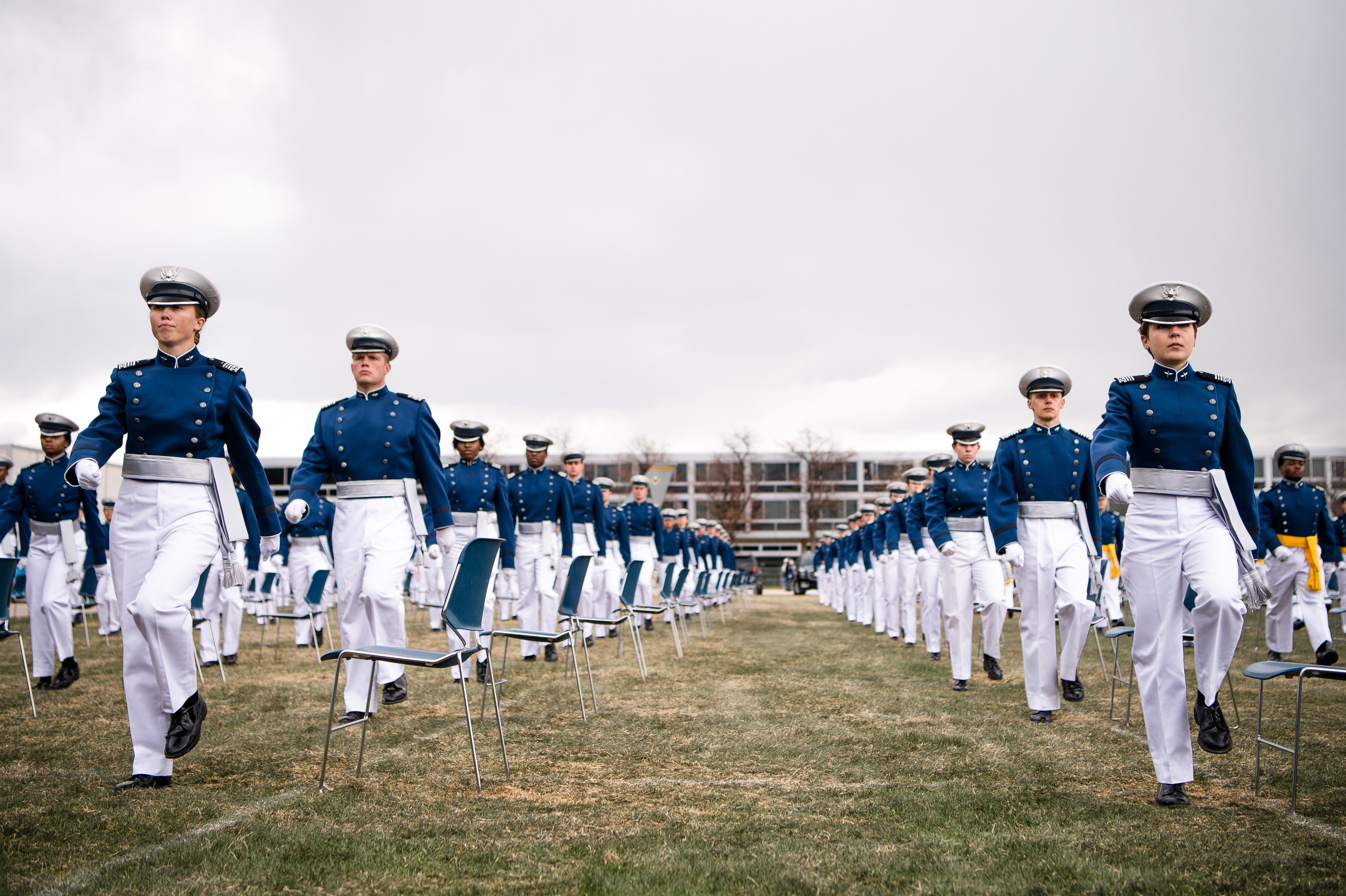
The first 86 Space Force lieutenants commissioned from the United States Air Force Academy (18 April 2020)

As the U.S. Space Force was established on 20 December 2019, General Jay Raymond, commander of U.S. Space Command and Air Force Space Command, became its first member and chief of space operations. Air Force Space Command was immediately redesignated as United States Space Force, however, the command and its 16,000 Airmen technically remained part of the Air Force. On 3 April 2020, Chief Master Sergeant Roger A. Towberman became the Space Force's second member and was appointed its first senior enlisted leader. The service gained its first new second lieutenants when 86 members of the U.S. Air Force Academy class of 2020 became Space Force members 3 through 88 on 18 April 2020. Currently serving Air Force space operators began to become Space Force members in September 2020 and the service gained its first astronaut when Colonel Michael S. Hopkins swore into the Space Force aboard the International Space Station on 18 December 2020.

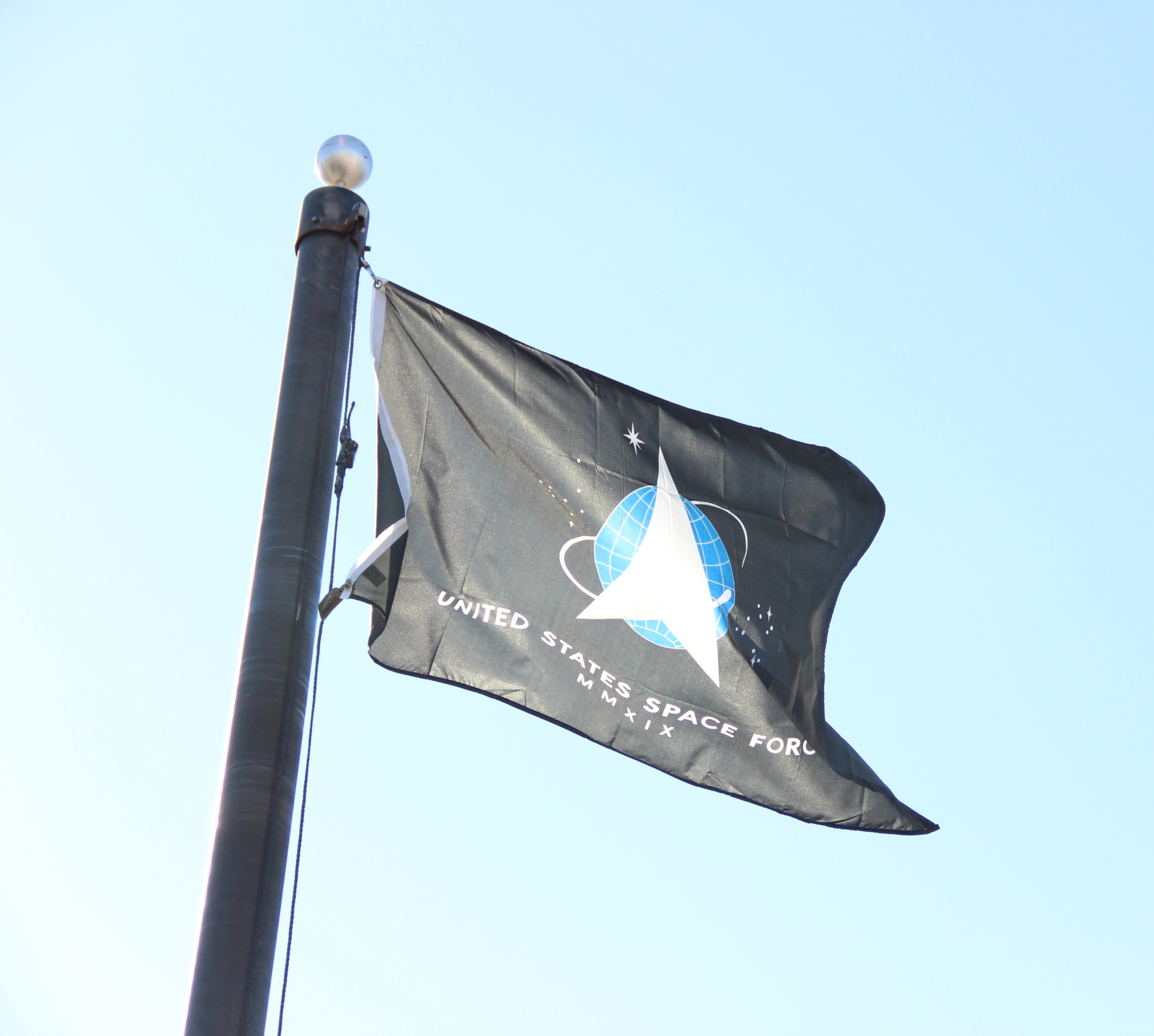
United States Space Force flag

The Space Force also began to build out its culture and identity; however, it experienced several public relations challenges due to its perceived ties to science fiction and links to President Trump. The Space Force adopted the Army and Air Force's OCP Uniform with blue stitching and a full color U.S. flag, sparking jokes about fighting on the forest moon of Endor from Star Wars: Return of the Jedi, while its distinctive service dress drew comparisons to Colonial Fleet uniforms from Battlestar Galactica or Starfleet uniforms from Star Trek. While the Space Force noted that its camouflage combat uniform was appropriate since space operators deploy to combat zones on the Earth alongside the rest of the joint force and it saved money, it did not have a similar response for its service dress uniform, which were described as a "futuristic-looking" design by General Raymond. The Space Force's seal and delta insignia were also incorrectly derided as a rip-off of Star Trek's Starfleet logo, despite being first adopted as a space symbol by the Air Force Ballistic Missile Division in 1962, four years before Star Trek first aired on television in 1966. Star Trek graphic designer Michael Okuda recalled that Starfleet's logo was chosen as an homage to Air Force Space Command, the Space Force's direct predecessor.

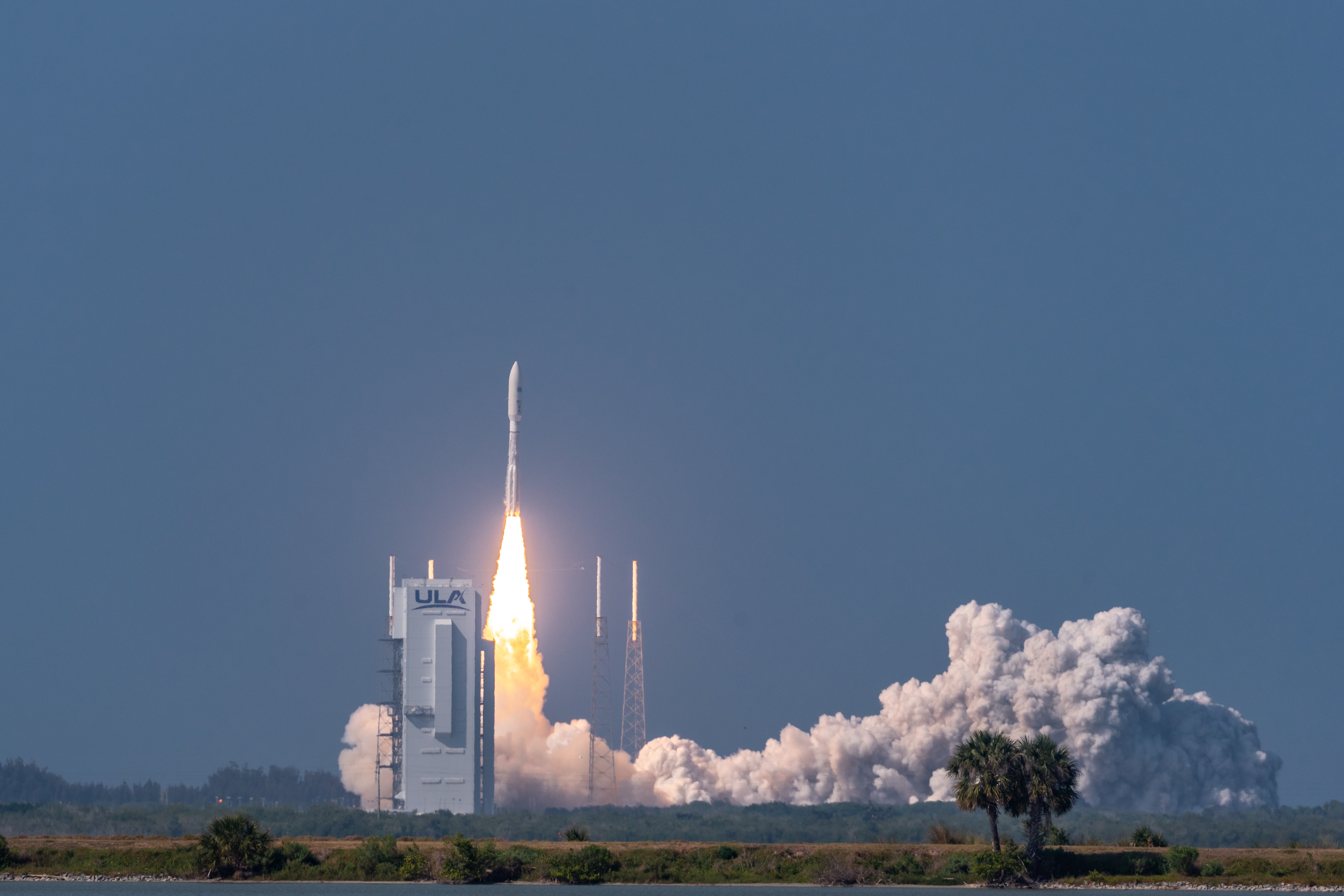
An Atlas V conducts the first U.S. Space Force space launch (26 March 2020).

The service also chose the title "Guardian" to represent its personnel, becoming its counterpart to Soldier and Airman. The term "Guardian" has a long history within Air Force Space Command, originally serving as part of its motto: "Guardians of the High Frontier." The Space Force also adopted Semper Supra as its official motto and unveiled its service song, sharing the same name. The decision on if the Space Force's ranks would mirror the Army, like the Air Force and Marine Corps, or the Navy, generated significant controversy, with Congressman Dan Crenshaw introducing an amendment which would force the Space Force to pattern itself after the Navy's rank structure. Ultimately, the amendment failed and the Space Force followed an Air Force/Army/Marine Corps-based rank scheme.

The Space Force began to officially incorporate former Air Force Space Command units in 2020 and 2021, standing up field commands to serve as counterparts to the Air Force's major commands. It also consolidated Air Force wings and groups into mission deltas, a formation roughly equivalent to an Army Brigade Combat Team or Air Force expeditionary wing, and space base deltas (briefly known as garrisons), equivalent to an Army garrison or Air Force air base wing. It also began to rename former Air Force bases and station to Space Force bases and station, starting with Patrick Space Force Base and Cape Canaveral Space Force Station. It also established component field commands to serve as Space Force components at the unified combatant commands, assuming space component responsibility from the U.S. Air Force.

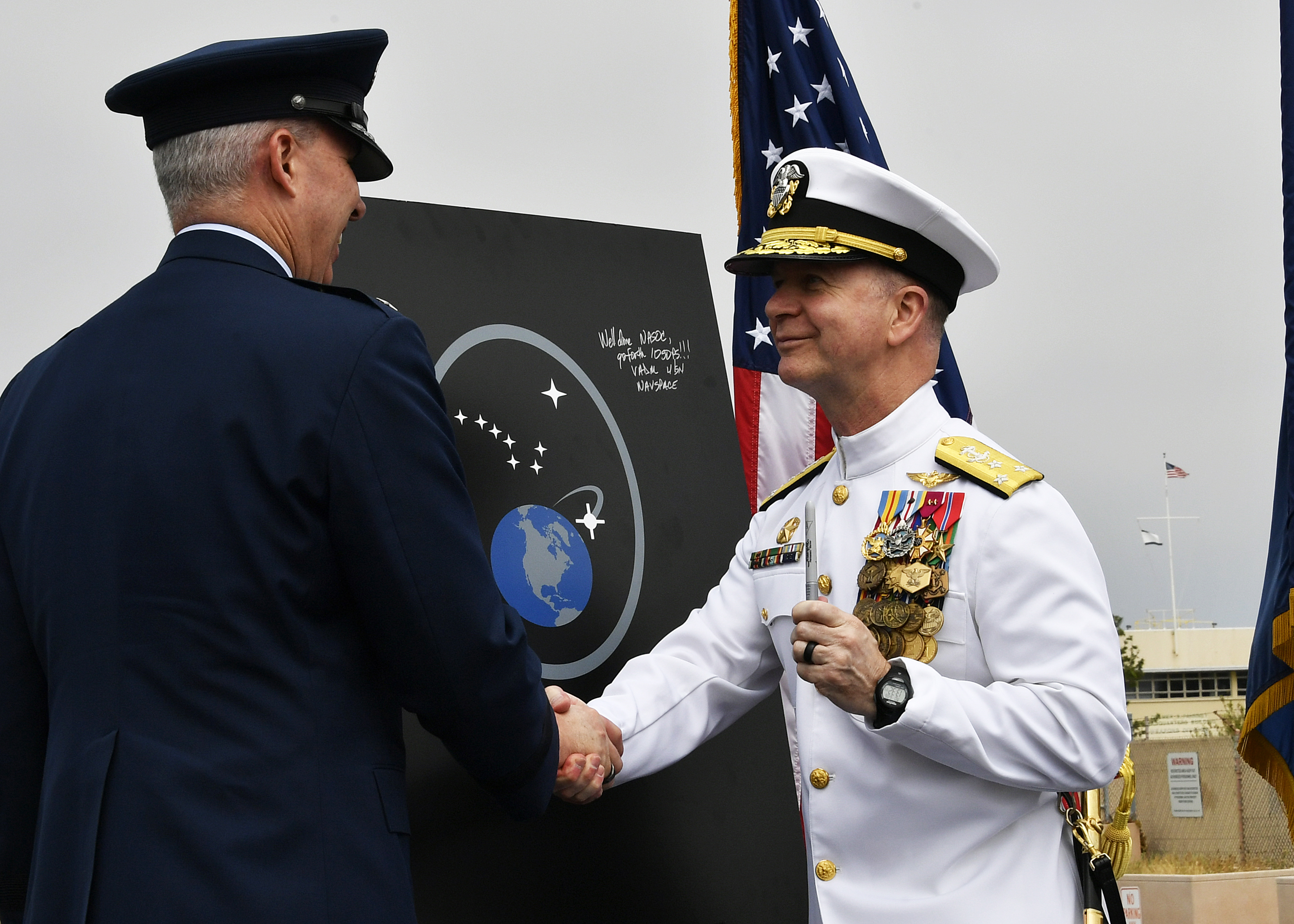
Transfer of the Naval Satellite Operations Center from the Navy to the Space Force (2022)

One of the primary reasons the Space Force was created was to consolidate space forces from across the U.S. Air Force, U.S. Army, and U.S. Navy. In 2020, the Space Training and Readiness Delta (Provisional) was established to form the foundation for Space Training and Readiness Command and incorporate Air Force space units spread across Air Combat Command and Air Education and Training Command, while Space Systems Command incorporated space acquisitions activities across Air Force Materiel Command, although, notably it did not incorporate space research and development conducted by the Air Force Research Laboratory. The Space Force also began incorporating space personnel transfers from the U.S. Army, U.S. Navy, and U.S. Marine Corps. In 2022, the Naval Satellite Operations Center and Army's Satellite Operations Brigade transferred to the Space Force, putting satellite communications under a single service for the first time in history. In 2023, it assumed responsibility for the Army's Joint Tactical Ground Station, putting all space-based missile warning under the Space Force. In 2026, the Space Force began its flexible personnel model by transferring 18 Air Force Reservists into the Space Force as part-time guardians. The Space Force has chosen not to stand up its own reserve force, but instead chosen to allow guardians to move between full-time and part-time status.

The Space Force's first significant combat action occurred less than a month after its establishment, providing missile warning when Iran launched missile strikes against U.S. troops at Al Asad Airbase on 7 January 2020. In 2021, the Russian Federation conducted an anti-satellite weapons test, destroying the Kosmos 1408 and putting the International Space Station at risk. During the conflict between Iran and Israel in 2024, the Space Force provided missile warning for the Iranian strikes against Israel in April 2024 and in October 2024. It also planned for Iranian retaliation ahead of the U.S. strikes on Iranian nuclear facilities in June 2025. The Space Force is involved in the Israeli–U.S. war against Iran in 2026 by assisting with communications, targeting, and navigation. On 28 August 2026, Trump signed a presidential proclamation directing the establishment of the United States Space Academy, an institution similar to West Point that would serve as a training academy for NASA, the Space Force, and the private spaceflight sector.

== Organization ==
Organization of the United States Space Force within the Department of Defense

The Space Force is organized into a headquarters staff that provides leadership and guidance for the force; field commands that are responsible for organizing, training, and equipping Guardians; deltas that support field commands and are specialized by mission area; and squadrons which specialize in acquisitions, cyberspace operations, engineering, intelligence, and space operations.

The Space Force has the following structure of military units:

- a section consists of two or more guardians; this is also referred to as an "element" in basic training
- a flight comprises Individual guardians or sections
- two or more flights form a squadron (commanded by major or lieutenant colonel) — the lowest level of command, usually identified by number and function
- two or more squadrons form a delta (commanded by colonel); there are three types of deltas:
  - mission delta is responsible for an entire mission set for the service
  - space base delta is responsible for base support on Space Force bases
  - space launch delta is responsible for both base support and the launch mission for its Space Force base
- field commands (commanded by major general or lieutenant general) are responsible for organizing, training and equipping thousands of guardians around the world; a field command is organized by mission, such as Space Training and Readiness Command, and reports directly to headquarters at the Pentagon
  - service component field commands (commanded by colonel or brigadier general) integrate Space Force capabilities with other service branches and combatant commands, serving as the bridge between the Space Force and the broader joint military structure; they are organized under the combatant command they support

=== Headquarters Space Force ===
At the headquarters level, the Space Force is led by the chief of space operations, a four-star general who reports to the secretary of the Air Force and provides military advice to civilian leadership of the Department of Defense and the White House. The Air Force and Space Force combine to form the Department of the Air Force, similar to the Navy and Marine Corps combining to form the Department of the Navy.

Title		Current holder
	Chief of space operations (CSO)	Gen Douglas A. Schiess
	Vice chief of space operations (VCSO)	Gen Shawn Bratton
Senior Enlisted Advisor of the Space Force	Chief Master Sergeant of the Space Force (CMSSF)	CMSSF John F. Bentivegna
a United States Space Force brigadier general	Director of staff (SF/DS)	Brig Gen Matthew Cantore
United States Senior Executive Service	Deputy chief of space operations for human capital (SF/S1)	Katharine Kelley
United States Senior Executive Service	Deputy chief of space operations for intelligence (SF/S2)	John J. Deeney IV (acting)
a United States Space Force brigadier general	Deputy chief of space operations for operations (SF/S3/4/7)	Brig. Gen Nick Hague (acting)
a United States Space Force lieutenant general	Deputy chief of space operations for strategy, plans, programs, requirements, and analysis (SF/S5/8)	Lt Gen David N. Miller
United States Senior Executive Service	Deputy chief of space operations for cyber and data (SF/S6)	Charleen D. Laughlin
a United States Air Force major general	Mobilization Assistant to the Chief of Space Operations	Maj Gen Robert Claude
	Assistant Chief of Space Operations for Future Concepts and Partnerships	AM Paul Godfrey

=== Field commands, Space Force elements, and direct reporting units ===
The Space Force's three field commands (FLDCOM) are purpose-built for specific activities, aligning to the various institutional responsibilities to organize, train, and equip Guardians. Component field commands (C-FLDCOM) coordinate and integrate space forces into planning and current operations within unified combatant commands. Direct reporting units (DRU) are hubs of innovation and intelligence expertise within the Space Force, providing new ideas or deep knowledge about highly specialized issues.

Field command	Mission	Headquarters
Space Force Combat Forces Command (CFC)	Generates, presents, and sustains space warfighting capability for combatant commanders	Peterson SFB, Colorado
Space Systems Command (SSC)	Develops, acquires, equips, fields, and sustains lethal and resilient space capabilities	Los Angeles AFB, California
Space Training and Readiness Command (STARCOM)	Increases Guardians' readiness to prevail in competition and conflict through education, training, doctrine, and test	Peterson SFB, Colorado
Component field command	Mission	Headquarters
U.S. Space Forces – Space (SPACEFOR–SPACE)	The U.S. Space Force component to U.S. Space Command which plans, executes, and integrates military spacepower into multi-domain global operations for all U.S. military operations beginning at the Kármán line, 62 miles/100 kilometers above mean sea level	Vandenberg SFB, California
U.S. Space Forces - Special Operations Command (SPACEFOR-SOC)	The U.S. Space Force component to the United States Special Operations Command which generates, prepares, and presents specialized Space Force personnel and force packages to U.S. Special Operations Command to integrate space capabilities into special operations.	MacDill Air Force Base, Florida
U.S. Space Forces – Central (SPACEFOR–CENT)	The U.S. Space Force component to U.S. Central Command which plans, executes, and integrates military power across an area of responsibility that spans Northeast Africa, the Middle East, and Central and South Asia	MacDill AFB, Florida
U.S. Space Forces – Europe and Africa (SPACEFOR–EURAF)	The U.S. Space Force component to U.S. European Command and U.S. Africa Command which plans, executes, and integrates military spacepower across an area of responsibility that spans Europe, large portions of Asia, the Middle East, Arctic Ocean, and Atlantic Ocean and Africa	Ramstein AB, Germany
U.S. Space Forces – Indo-Pacific (SPAFOR-INDOPAC)	The U.S. Space Force component to U.S. Indo-Pacific Command which plans, executes, and integrates military spacepower across an area of responsibility that spans the Asia-Pacific region	JB Pearl Harbor-Hickam, Hawaii
U.S. Space Forces Southern (SPACEFOR–SOUTH)	The U.S. Space Force component to U.S. Southern Command responsible for integrating space power with joint, interagency and multinational partners to support regional security, deterrence and stability across Central America, South America and the Caribbean.	Davis-Monthan Air Force Base, Arizona
U.S. Space Forces Northern (SPACEFOR-NORTH)	The U.S. Space Force component to U.S. Northern Command responsible for incorporating continental defense, multi-domain awareness; missile warning and tracking; global positioning, navigation, and timing; and orbital and electromagnetic warfare.	Peterson Space Force Base, Colorado
Space Force Element	Mission	Headquarters
Space Force Element National Reconnaissance Office (SFELM NRO)	Supports the design, development, launch, and maintenance of America's intelligence satellites	Chantilly, Virginia
Direct Reporting Unit	Mission	Headquarters
Space Development Agency (SDA)	Develops, demonstrates, and transitions resilient military space-based sensing, tracking, and data transport capabilities into a proliferated multi-orbit architecture, encompassing government, commercial, and rapid acquisition architectures	The Pentagon, Arlington County, Virginia
Space Rapid Capabilities Office (SpRCO)	Specializes in the expedited development and rapid production and deployment of space capabilities to fulfill short-term critical needs	Kirtland AFB, New Mexico
Field Operating Agency	Mission	Headquarters
National Space Intelligence Center (NSIC)	Delivers unparalleled technical expertise and game-changing intelligence – empowering national leaders, joint force warfighter and acquisition professionals to outwit, out-reach and win in the space domain	Wright-Patterson AFB, Ohio

=== Bases ===
While the Space Force's headquarters is in Washington, D.C., the rest of the service is spread across the United States and abroad, across 18 states and territories and 46 bases and installations as of 2024.

U.S. Space Force installations and locations within mainland United States
U.S. Space Force installations and locations outside of the contiguous United States

U.S. Space Force installations
Name	Location	Garrison
Buckley Space Force Base	Aurora, Colorado	Space Base Delta 2
Peterson Space Force Base	Colorado Springs, Colorado	Space Base Delta 1
Schriever Space Force Base	Colorado Springs, Colorado	Space Base Delta 41
Los Angeles Air Force Base	El Segundo, California	Space Base Delta 3
Patrick Space Force Base	Satellite Beach, Florida	Space Launch Delta 45
Vandenberg Space Force Base	Lompoc, California	Space Launch Delta 30
Cape Canaveral Space Force Station	Cape Canaveral, Florida	Space Launch Delta 45
Cheyenne Mountain Space Force Station	Cheyenne Mountain, Colorado	Space Base Delta 1
Cape Cod Space Force Station	Sagamore, Massachusetts	6th Space Warning Squadron
Cavalier Space Force Station	Cavalier, North Dakota	10th Space Warning Squadron
Clear Space Force Station	Clear, Alaska	13th Space Warning Squadron
Kaena Point Space Force Station	Kaena Point, Hawaii	21st Space Operations Squadron
New Boston Space Force Station	Hillsborough County, New Hampshire	23rd Space Operations Squadron
Maui Space Force Station	Maui, Hawaii	15th Space Surveillance Squadron
Pituffik Space Base	Pituffik, Greenland	Space Base Delta 1

== Department of the Space Force and Army space consolidation ==
=== Department of the Space Force ===
As the United States Space Force matures, and as national security requires, it will become necessary to create a separate military department, to be known as the Department of the Space Force.

— Space Policy Directive-4, 2019

The Space Force is currently organized as a service under the Department of the Air Force, more closely mirroring the concept of a Space Corps rather than a fully independent Space Force. Senator Bob Smith, the 2001 Rumsfeld Commission, and 2008 Allard Commission each envisioned that a Space Corps would first be created under the Department of the Air Force as an interim measure as it grew into a fully independent Space Force. In 2019, Space Policy Directive-4 directed the Space Force be initially established under the Department of the Air Force as the first step towards an independent Department of the Space Force, which would take over the entire space mission from the Department of the Air Force. It also directed the secretary of defense to conduct a periodic review to determine when to recommend the president seek legislation to establish the Department of the Space Force.

Following the Space Force's establishment there have been a number of calls to rename the Department of the Air Force to the Department of the Air and Space Forces to reflect its composition of the U.S. Air Force and U.S. Space Force. Congress previously explored renaming the Department of the Air Force to the Department of the Aerospace Force in 1981 and congressional efforts were made in the 2000s to rename the Department of the Navy to the Department of the Navy and Marine Corps; however, both of these proposals failed under opposition from the Defense Department.

Space Force advocates have also called for the creation of an undersecretary of the Air Force for space. This provision was included in the Trump administration's original legislative proposal to give the Space Force additional independence and autonomy but was removed by the Senate. There have also been numerous calls from inside and outside the Space Force for it to have its own public affairs and judge advocates general, independent from Air Force.

=== Consolidating Army space activities ===
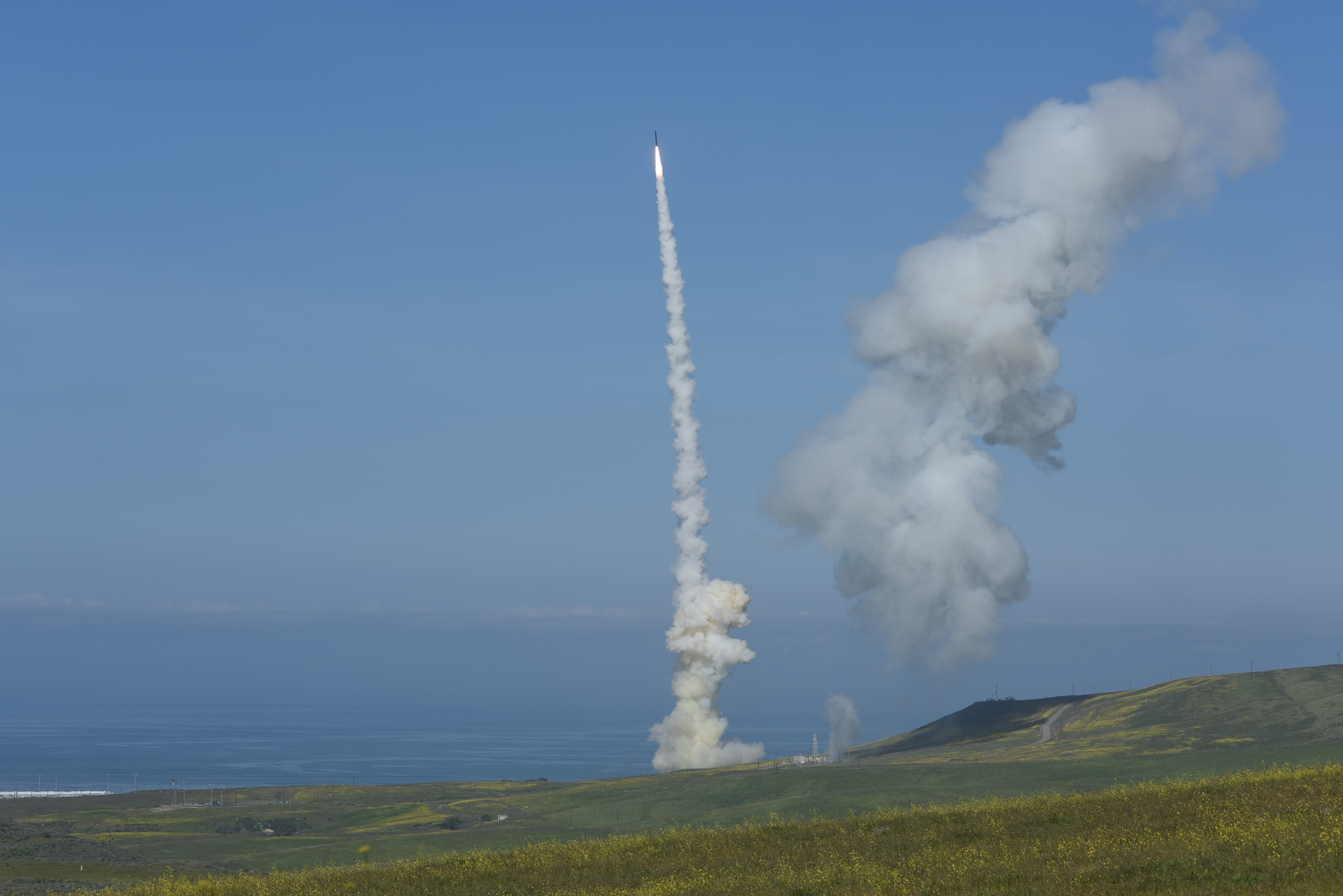
Launch of an Army Ground Based Interceptor from Vandenberg Space Force Base

When the Space Force was established in 2019 it was intended to consolidate the existing military space forces across the Army, Navy, and Air Force. While the Navy and Air Force gave up all of their space related assets, the greatest resistance to transferring space forces came from the Army.

While the Army transferred its satellite communications and missile warning assets, there are still calls for it to transfer 1st Space Brigade and 100th Missile Defense Brigade to the Space Force. The Heritage Foundation called for the wholesale transfer of United States Army Space and Missile Defense Command, including the 100th Missile Defense Brigade and the 1st Space Brigade. The 100th Missile Defense Brigade operates the Ground Based Interceptor system and is located at Schriever Space Force Base, Vandenberg Space Force Base, and Fort Greely. Former Air Force space officers have called to move the missile defense and intercontinental ballistic missile mission to the Space Force and the Center for Strategic and International Studies has also proposed moving missile defense into the Space Force. The Army also continues to maintain a cadre of Functional Area 40 space operations officers, although over 85% indicated they would transfer to the Space Force if able. The Army is also maintaining the 1st Space Brigade; however, the RAND Corporation has conducted a study calling for its transfer to the Space Force.

== Relationships with other space organizations ==
=== National Aeronautics and Space Administration ===
The U.S. Space Force and its antecedents have a long history of cooperation with NASA, as the lead government agencies for military and civil spaceflight. The Space Force's predecessors in the Air Force, Navy, and Army provided NASA with its early space launch vehicles and most of its astronauts.

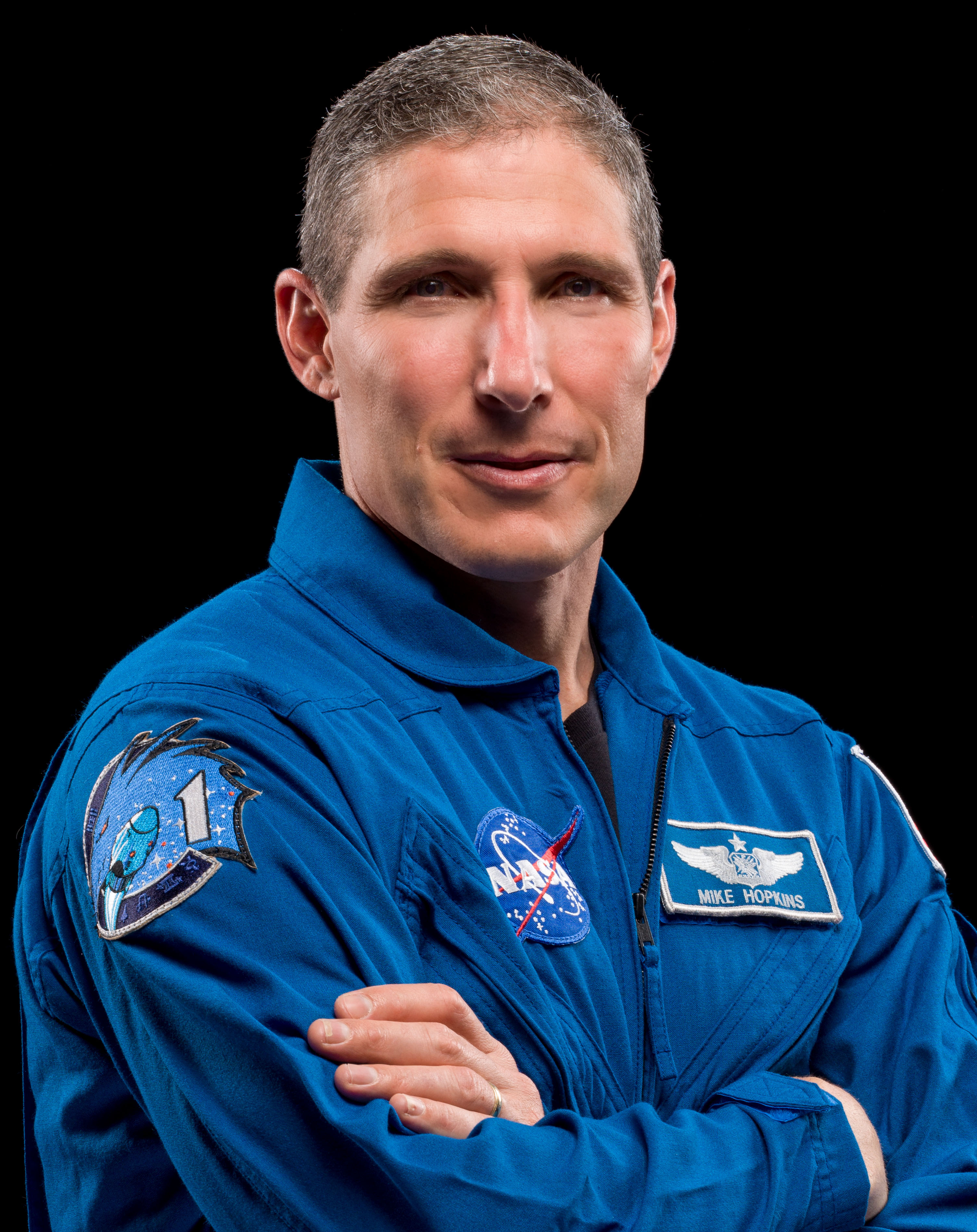
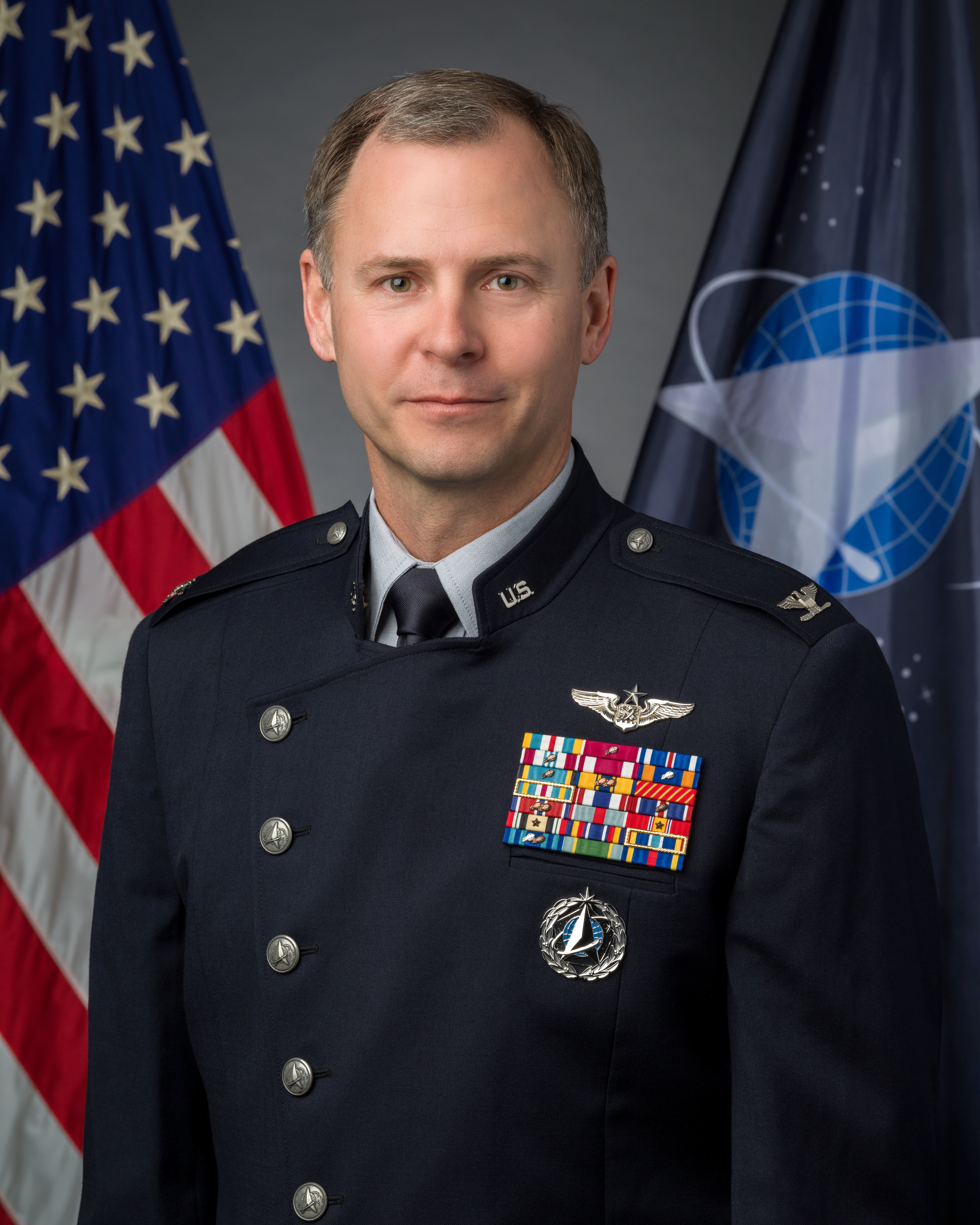
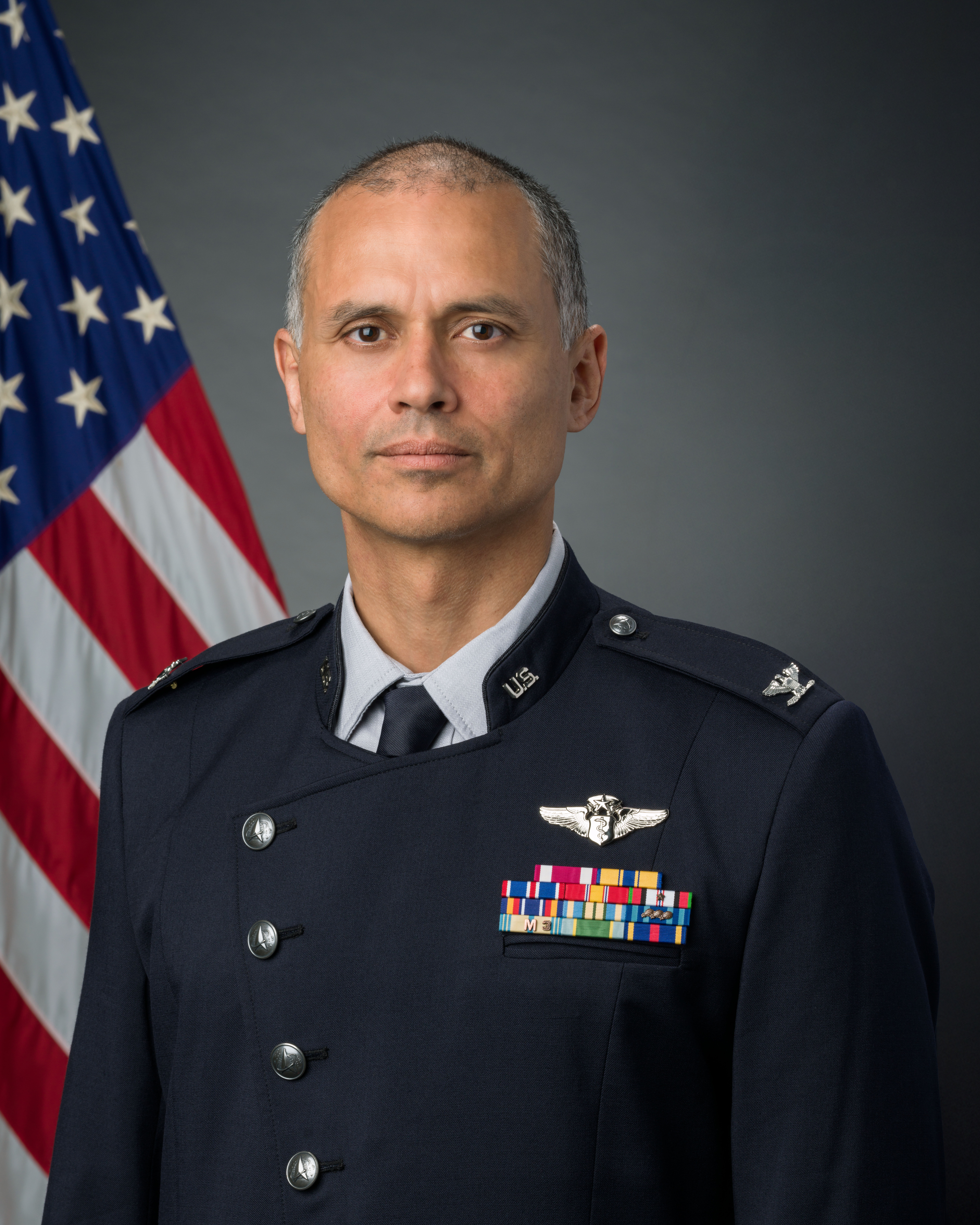
The Space Force's first three astronauts, Colonel Michael S. Hopkins (left), Colonel (later Brigadier General) Nick Hague (center) and Colonel Anil Menon, M.D. (right)

The Space Force hosts NASA launch operations at Vandenberg Space Force Base and Cape Canaveral Space Force Station. NASA occasionally hosts U.S. Space Force heavy launches out of Kennedy Space Center. The Space Force continues to support NASA's human spaceflight missions with range support of Space Launch Delta 45 and tracks threats to the International Space Station and other crewed spacecraft.

The Space Force and NASA partner on matters such as space domain awareness and planetary defense. Space Force members can be NASA astronauts, with Colonel Michael S. Hopkins, the commander of SpaceX Crew-1, commissioned into the Space Force from the International Space Station on 18 December 2020.

=== National Reconnaissance Office ===

The National Reconnaissance Office (NRO) is a Department of Defense agency and a member of the United States Intelligence Community, responsible for designing, building, launching, and maintaining intelligence satellites. The Space Force executes National Reconnaissance Office space launches and consists of 40% of the agency's personnel. Proposals have been put forward, including by the Air Force Association and retired Air Force Lieutenant General David Deptula, to merge the NRO into the Space Force, transforming it into a Space Force Intelligence, Reconnaissance, and Surveillance Command and consolidating the entire national security space apparatus in the Space Force.

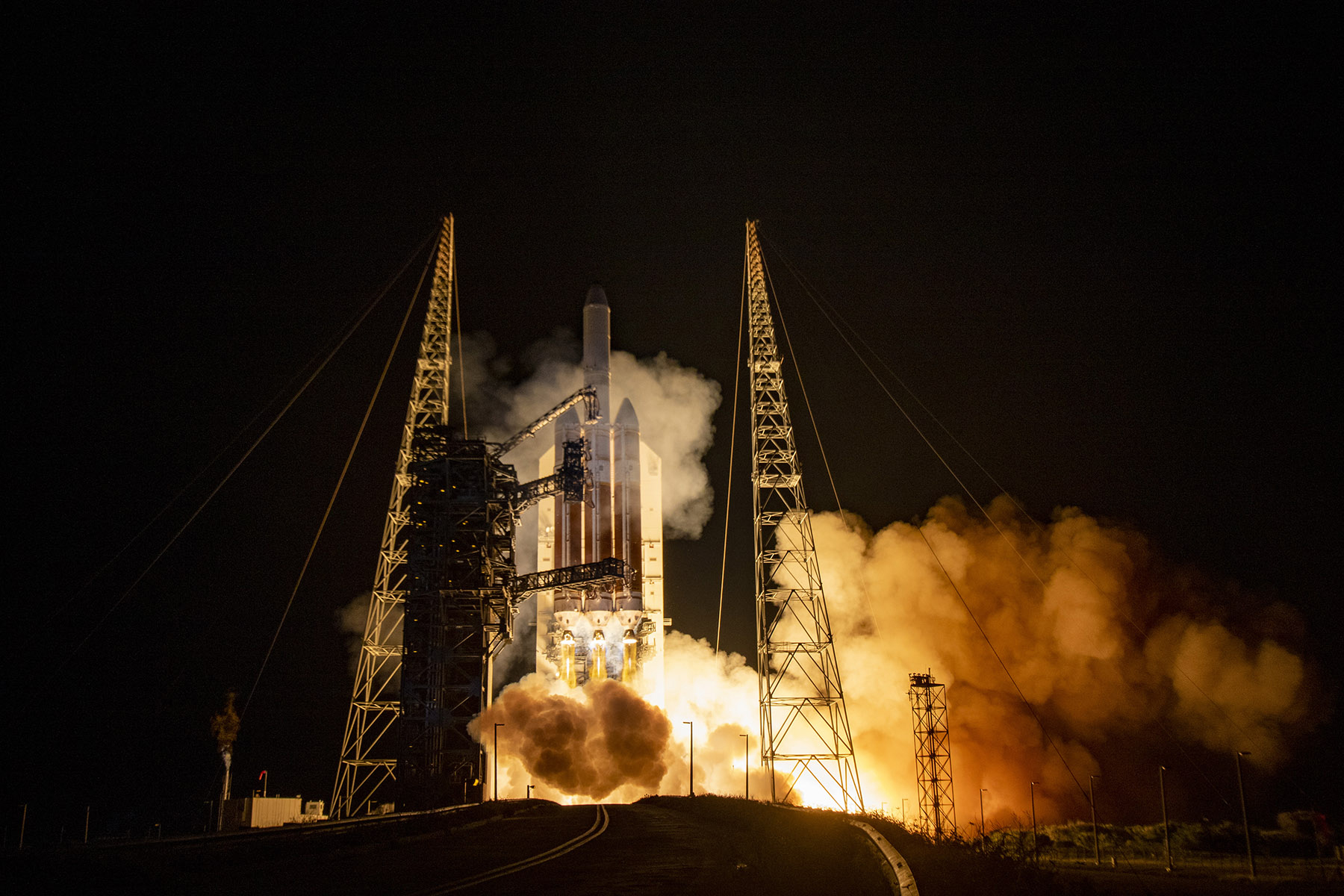
Launch of the NROL-44 mission from Cape Canaveral Space Force Station

The USSF's Space Systems Command (SSC), in partnership with the National Reconnaissance Office, manages the National Security Space Launch (NSSL) program, which uses government and contract spacecraft to launch sensitive government payloads. NSSL supports both the USSF and NRO. NRO director Scolese has characterized his agency as critical to American space dominance and the Space Force, stating that NRO provides "unrivaled situational awareness and intelligence to the best imagery and signals data on the planet." Additionally, in August 2021, former NRO deputy director Lt Gen Michael Guetlein became commander of Space Systems Command.

=== National Oceanic and Atmospheric Administration ===

The Space Force and the National Oceanic and Atmospheric Administration (NOAA) jointly operate the military's weather satellites. Additionally, NOAA's Office of Space Commerce is responsible for civilian space situational awareness and space traffic management.

The decision to transition space traffic management from the military to the Department of Commerce was made due to the significant growth in commercial spacecraft and to mirror how the Federal Aviation Administration, rather than the U.S. Air Force, handles air traffic management.

== Personnel and culture ==
=== Symbols ===
==== The delta symbol ====
The delta symbol – an origin story

In the late 19th and early 20th centuries, scientists derived the rocket equation, which made spaceflight possible. In this equation, $\Delta v$ represents the change in velocity. Since the 20th century, the delta has been used to represent a stylized aircraft, missile, or arrow. In 1940, the United States Army Air Forces 36th Fighter Group used the delta on its shield, which is still used by the U.S. Air Force 36th Fighter Wing.

After World War II, the delta began to be used by the space program, appearing on the joint U.S. Air Force-NASA X-15. In 1962, the Air Force Ballistic Missile Division became the first of a long line of international military space organizations to use the delta, which, in the Air Force Space Command shield represented the Air Force's upward thrust into space and the launch vehicles used to place satellites into orbit. This delta later evolved into the U.S. Space Force's seal and its logo in 2020, becoming the basic shape for field command and delta emblems.

==== Guardians ====
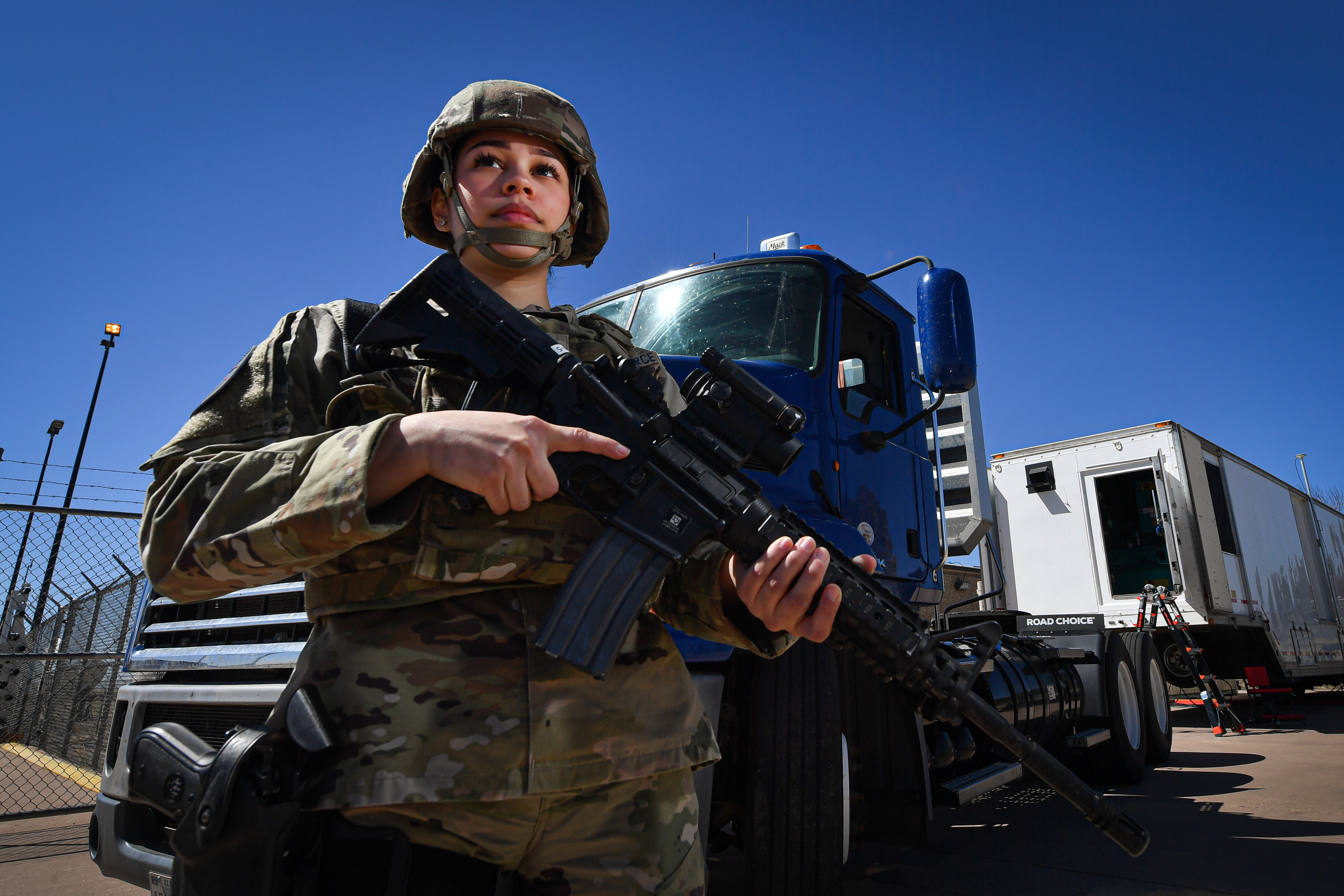
A Space Force specialist with the 4th Space Operations Squadron performing an armed security detail

Space Force service members have the title of Guardians, similar to how members of the U.S. Marine Corps are called Marines and members of the Air Force are called Airmen. The title of guardian traces its heritage to Air Force Space Command's 1983 motto Guardians of the High Frontier. Prior to the announcement of Guardian as the service title on 18 December 2020, members of the Space Force were referred to as space professionals.

==== Semper Supra ====
The Space Force's motto, Semper Supra – "Always Above". It mirrors the mottos of the Marine Corps (Semper Fidelis – Always Faithful) and Coast Guard (Semper Paratus – Always Ready). The Space Force's service song takes its name from the motto.

=== Specialties and badges ===
Space Force Officer Training Course	Space Operations	Intelligence	Cyberspace Operations	Acquisition and engineering
Officer
Graduation from Space Force Officer Training Course (OTC) Interim badge (formerly Multi-Domain Warfare Officer badge)	13A – Astronaut; 13S – Space Operations Officer	14N – Intelligence Officer	17S – Cyberspace Effects Operations Officer	62EXA – Aeronautical Engineer; 62EXB – Astronautical Engineer; 62EXC – Computer Systems Engineer; 62EXE – Electrical/Electronic Engineer; 62EXH – Mechanical Engineer; 62EXI – Human Factors Engineer/Human Systems Integration; 63A – Acquisitions Manager
Enlisted
	5S – Space Systems Operator	5I0 – All Source Intelligence Analyst; 5I1 – Geospatial Intelligence Analyst; 5I2 – Signals Intelligence Analyst; 5I3 – Fusion Analyst; 5I8 – Targeting Analyst	5C – Cyberspace Operations	

Space operators are the largest career field in the Space Force and comprise much of its senior leadership. Space operations officers are responsible for leading the Space Force's space operations forces. Space operations officers (13S) are responsible for planning and leading space combat operations across orbital warfare, space electromagnetic warfare, space battle management, and space access and sustainment spacepower disciplines. They also formulate space operations policy, coordinate space operations, and plan, organize, and direct space operations programs. Enlisted Space Systems Operators (5S) are responsible for conducting orbital warfare, space electromagnetic warfare, space battle management, and space access and sustainment operations. Space operations officers and enlisted space systems operators are awarded the Space Operations Badge after completing the 533rd Training Squadron's Undergraduate Space Training program at Vandenberg Space Force Base, with follow-on education provided by the 319th Combat Training Squadron and National Security Space Institute.

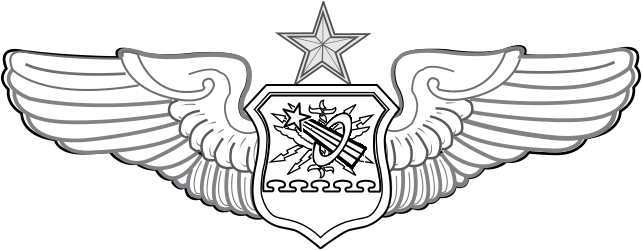
Senior observer badge with the astronaut device as awarded to Space Force astronauts

Space Force astronauts (13A) fly as Space Force officers on assignment to NASA. Space Force astronauts command, operate, and pilot crewed spacecraft, accomplish on-orbit duties on the International Space Station or other spacecraft, operate Department of Defense payloads, and provide spaceflight consultation to the Department of Defense and other government agencies. Space Force astronauts must complete NASA Astronaut Candidate (ASCAN) training at Johnson Space Center. Once completing a spaceflight, Space Force astronauts are awarded the observer badge with astronaut rating.

Intelligence officers (14N) lead the Space Force's intelligence, surveillance, and reconnaissance enterprise, performing intelligence activities and analysis. They lead enlisted All Source Intelligence Analysts (5I0), Geospatial Intelligence Analysts (5I1), Signals Intelligence Analysts (5I2), and Fusion Analysts (5I4), and Targeting Analysts (5I8). Intelligence officers and enlisted analysts are awarded their intelligence badge after completing intelligence training with the 533rd Training Squadron Detachment 1 at Goodfellow Air Force Base, with follow-on education provided by the 319th Combat Training Squadron and National Security Space Institute.

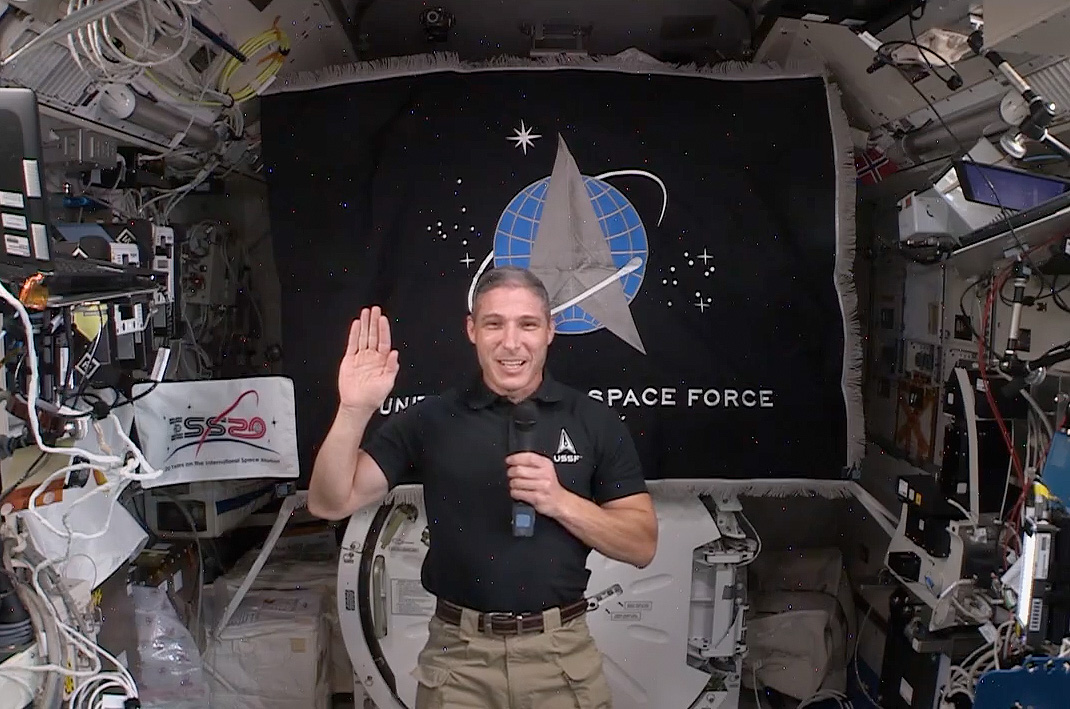
Colonel Michael S. Hopkins became the U.S. Space Force's first astronaut when he transferred from the U.S. Air Force on the International Space Station (18 December 2020).

Cyberspace effects operations officers (17S) are responsible for operating cyberspace weapons systems, satellite communications systems, and commanding cyber crews. They lead enlisted Cyberspace Operations guardians. Cyberspace effects operations officers and enlisted cyberspace operators are awarded the cyberspace operator badge after completing Undergraduate Cyber Training with the Air Force's 81st Training Wing at Keesler Air Force Base, with follow-on education provided by the 319th Combat Training Squadron and National Security Space Institute.

Acquisition and engineering are officer only career fields within the Space Force. Specific developmental engineers (62E) include aeronautical engineers (62EXA), astronautical engineers (62EXB), computer systems engineers (62EXC), electrical/electronic engineer (62EXE), mechanical engineer (62EXH) and the human factors engineer/human systems integration (62EXI). Space Force engineers graduate from the Defense Acquisition University and the U.S. Air Force Flight Test Engineer course, or a comparable program. Acquisition managers (63A) are responsible for the Space Force's acquisition process.

==== Spacepower disciplines ====
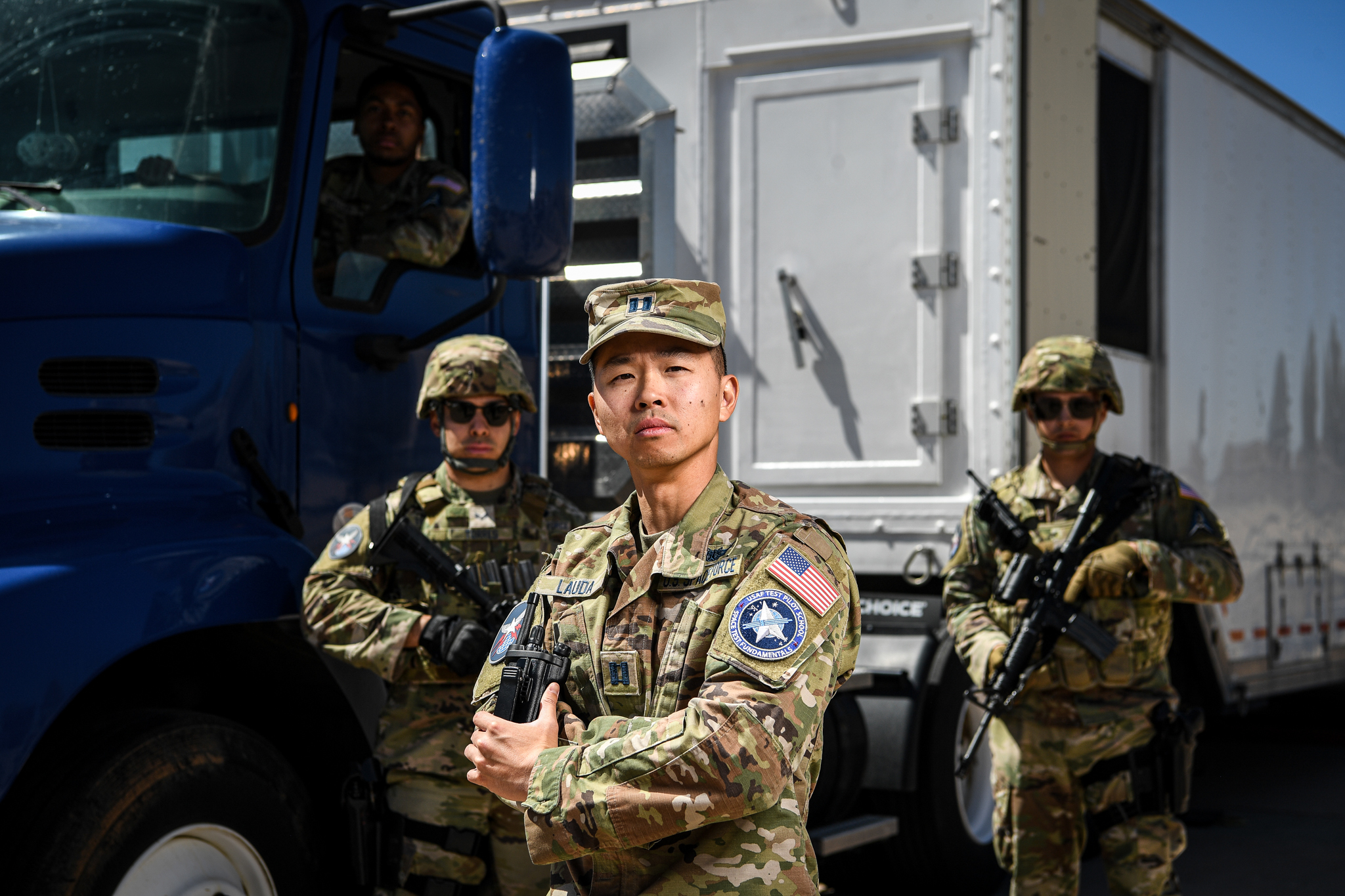
Members of the 4th Space Operations Squadron Mobile Operations Flight conducting armed convoy operations

The U.S. Space Force has seven core spacepower disciplines in which its personnel gain experience:

1. Orbital warfare: Knowledge of orbital maneuver as well as offensive and defensive fires to preserve freedom of access to the domain. Skill to ensure United States and coalition space forces can continue to provide capability to the Joint Force while denying that same advantage to the adversary.
2. Space electromagnetic warfare: Knowledge of spectrum awareness, maneuver within the spectrum, and non-kinetic fires within the spectrum to deny adversary use of vital links. Skill to manipulate physical access to communication pathways and awareness of how those pathways contribute to enemy advantage.
3. Space battle management: Knowledge of how to orient to the space domain and skill in making decisions to preserve mission, deny adversary access, and ultimately ensure mission accomplishment. Ability to identify hostile actions and entities, conduct combat identification, target, and direct action in response to an evolving threat environment.
4. Space access and sustainment: Knowledge of processes, support, and logistics required to maintain and prolong operations in the space domain. Ability to resource, apply, and leverage spacepower in, from, and to the space domain.
5. Military intelligence: Knowledge to conduct intelligence-led, threat-focused operations based on the insights. Ability to leverage the broader intelligence community to ensure military spacepower has the intelligence, surveillance, and reconnaissance capabilities needed to defend the space domain.
6. Engineering and acquisition: Knowledge that ensures military spacepower has the best capabilities in the world to defend the space domain. Ability to form science, technology, and acquisition partnerships with other national security space organizations, commercial entities, Allies, and academia to ensure the warfighters are properly equipped.
7. Cyber operations: Knowledge to defend the global networks upon which military spacepower is vitally dependent. Ability to employ cyber security and cyber defense of critical space networks and systems. Skill to employ future offensive capabilities.

=== Rank structure ===
==== Officers ====
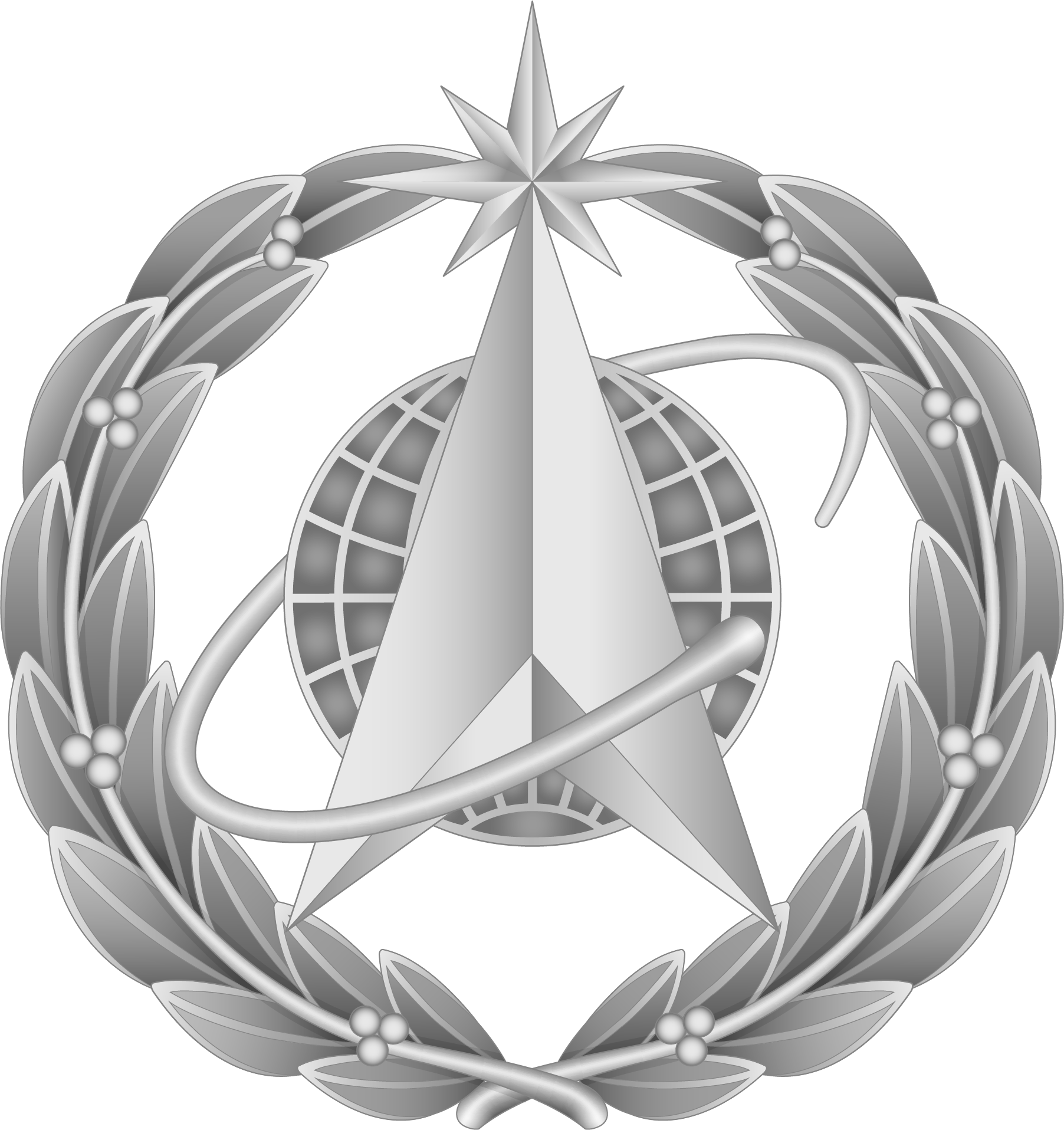
Officer service cap badge.

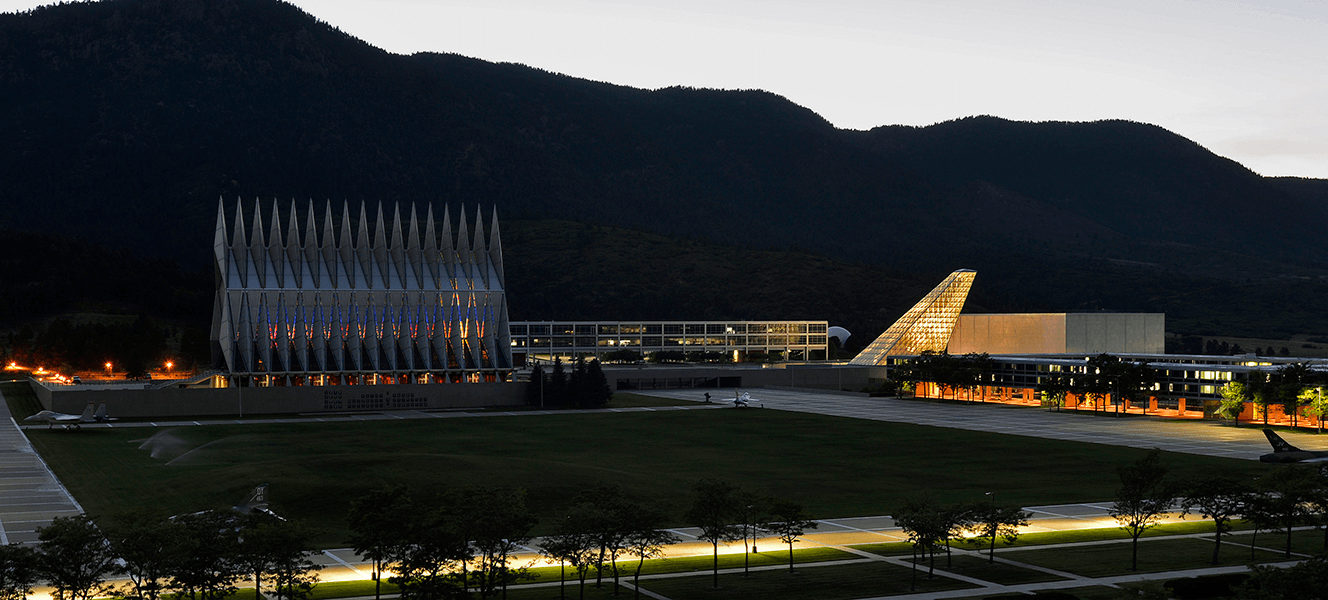
The United States Air Force Academy in Colorado Springs, considered the premier commissioning source for Space Force officers

Officers are the leaders of the U.S. Space Force and are responsible for planning operations and managing personnel. Space Force officers enter the service through three different paths: graduating from the United States Air Force Academy, Air Force Reserve Officer Training Corps, or Air Force Officer Training School.

The premier commissioning route for Space Force officers is through the U.S. Air Force Academy, a public university and military academy. Approximately ~10% of each class commissions as U.S. Space Force officers, with the remainder entering into the U.S. Air Force. Space Delta 13, Detachment 1 is responsible for providing Space Force training, immersion, and mentorship to cadets. The Air Force Academy has a long history with Air Force space, establishing the world's first Department of Astronautics in 1958 and the Cadet Space Operations Squadron, which operates the FalconSAT satellites, in 1997. Additional space programs, such as the Azimuth program, i5 Squadron and Blue Horizon rocketry club have stood up and as of 2023, the Air Force Academy offers two space majors, a space warfighting minor, and 29 space courses across all its academic departments. On 18 April 2020, the Air Force Academy commissioned 86 officers into the Space Force, becoming the first group of individuals to enter the service after the first chief of space operations, General Jay Raymond, and the senior enlisted advisor of the Space Force, Chief Master Sergeant Roger Towberman.

The Air Force Reserve Officer Training Corps program is offered at 1,100 colleges and universities. Like the Air Force Academy, it commissions officers directly into either the Air Force or Space Force. The Air Force Officer Training School is the final path to commission into the Space Force, graduating its first two Space Force officers on 16 October 2020 and its first all-Space Force flight graduating on 17 March 2023.

The Space Force partners with Johns Hopkins University's Paul H. Nitze School of Advanced International Studies to provide Intermediate Developmental Education and Senior Developmental Education. Additional educational opportunities for officers include the 319th Combat Training Squadron, National Security Space Institute, Air Force Institute of Technology, U.S. Air Force Weapons School, the Acquisition Instructor Course, U.S. Air Force Test Pilot School, the Space Test Course, and Air University's School of Advanced Air and Space Studies.

US DoD pay grade	O-10	O-9	O-8	O-7	O-6	O-5	O-4	O-3	O-2	O-1	Officer candidate
NATO code	OF-9	OF-8	OF-7	OF-6	OF-5	OF-4	OF-3	OF-2	OF-1		OF(D)
Insignia											Various insignia
Service dress uniform (Class A)
Title	General	Lieutenant general	Major general	Brigadier general	Colonel	Lieutenant colonel	Major	Captain	First lieutenant	Second lieutenant	Cadet / Officer trainee
Abbreviation	Gen	Lt Gen	Maj Gen	Brig Gen	Col	Lt Col	Maj	Capt	1st Lt	2d Lt	Cdt / OT

==== Enlisted ====
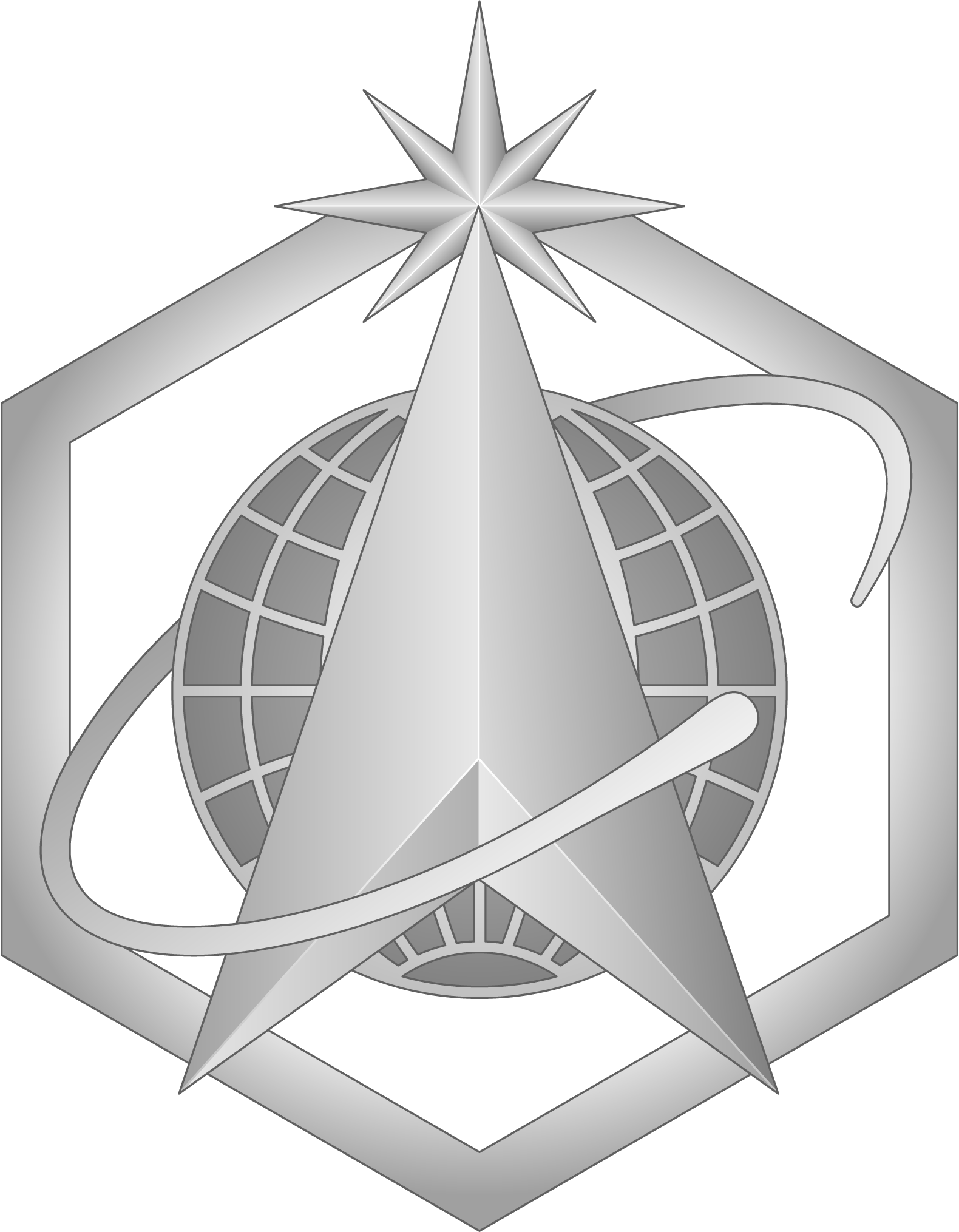
Enlisted service cap badge

Enlisted members participate in and support operations. Space Force enlisted members complete Basic Military Training at Joint Base San Antonio. Space Force Basic Military Training is identical to Air Force Basic Military Training, with the addition of Space Force-specific curriculum. On 20 October 2020, the first four individuals enlisted into the Space Force and on 10 December 2020, the first seven enlisted members to enter the Space Force graduated from Basic Military Training. In May 2022, the Space Force started running its own all-Guardian Basic Military Training to reinforce Space Force culture.

Space Force enlisted members are enrolled in the Community College of the Air Force, earning an associate in applied science degree. Professional military education is conducted at Space Training and Readiness Command's Forrest L. Vosler Non-Commissioned Officer Academy. Other educational opportunities for enlisted members include the 319th Combat Training Squadron, National Security Space Institute, Advanced Instructor Course and the Space Test Course.

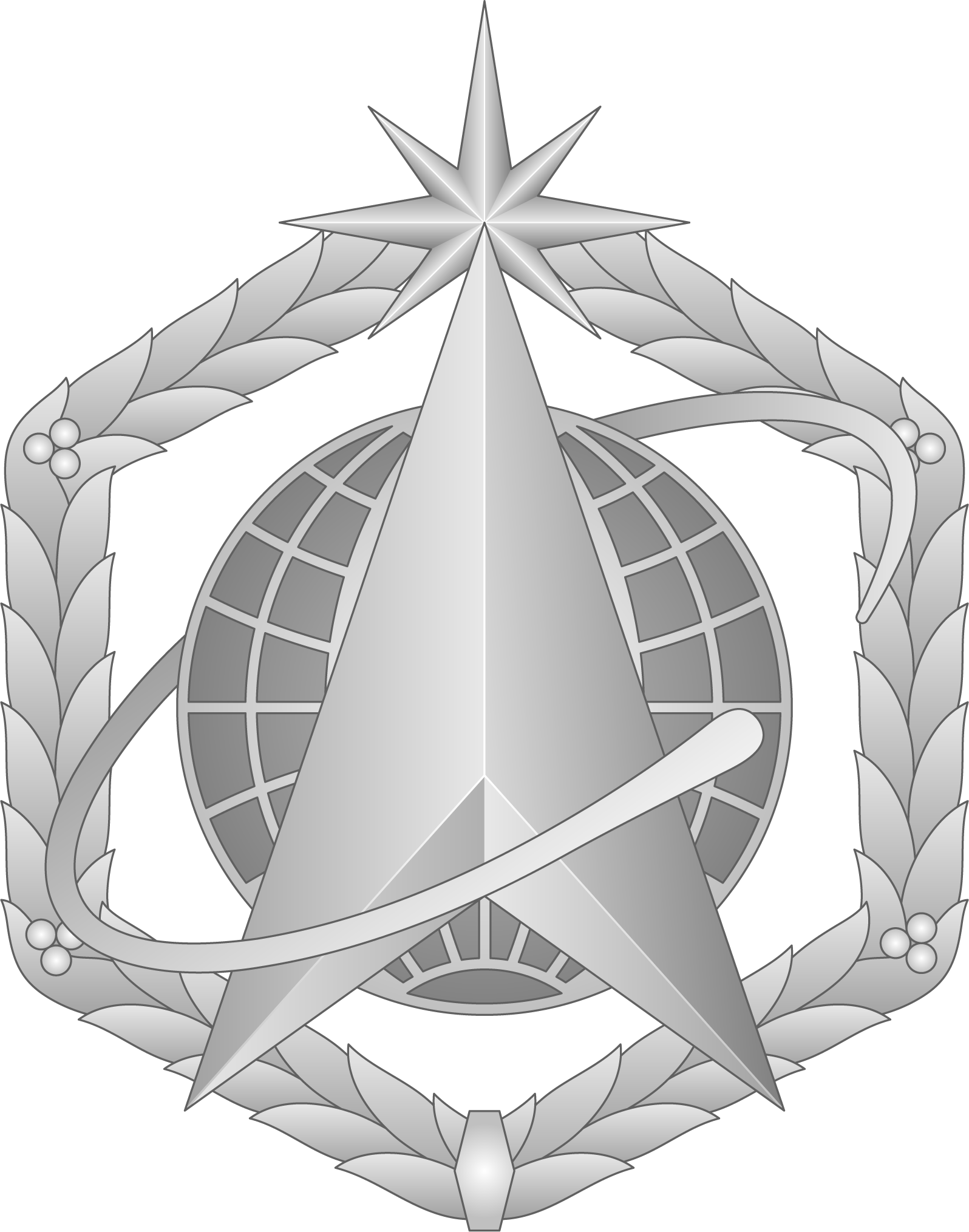
Chief Master Sergeant of the Space Force service cap badge

The Space Force's enlisted rank design is centered on a hexagon, representing the Space Force's status as the sixth military service in the Armed Forces. The horizontal stripes for Specialist 2, 3, and 4 were inspired by an early proposal for Air Force enlisted ranks known as "Vandenberg stripes". The delta represents the Space Force. The specialist stripes represent terra firma, the solid foundation of skills upon which the Space Force is built. Noncommissioned officer insignia feature traditional chevrons and the "Delta, Globe, and Orbit," representing the totality of the Space Force. Finally, senior noncommissioned officer insignia are topped with "orbital chevrons", representing low Earth orbit for master sergeants, medium Earth orbit for senior master sergeants, and geosynchronous orbit for chief master sergeants. These orbital chevrons signify the higher levels of responsibility and willingness to explore and innovate placed upon senior noncommissioned officers. Finally, the Chief master Sergeant of the Space Force is represented by a "Delta, Globe, and Orbit" in a hexagonal wreath.

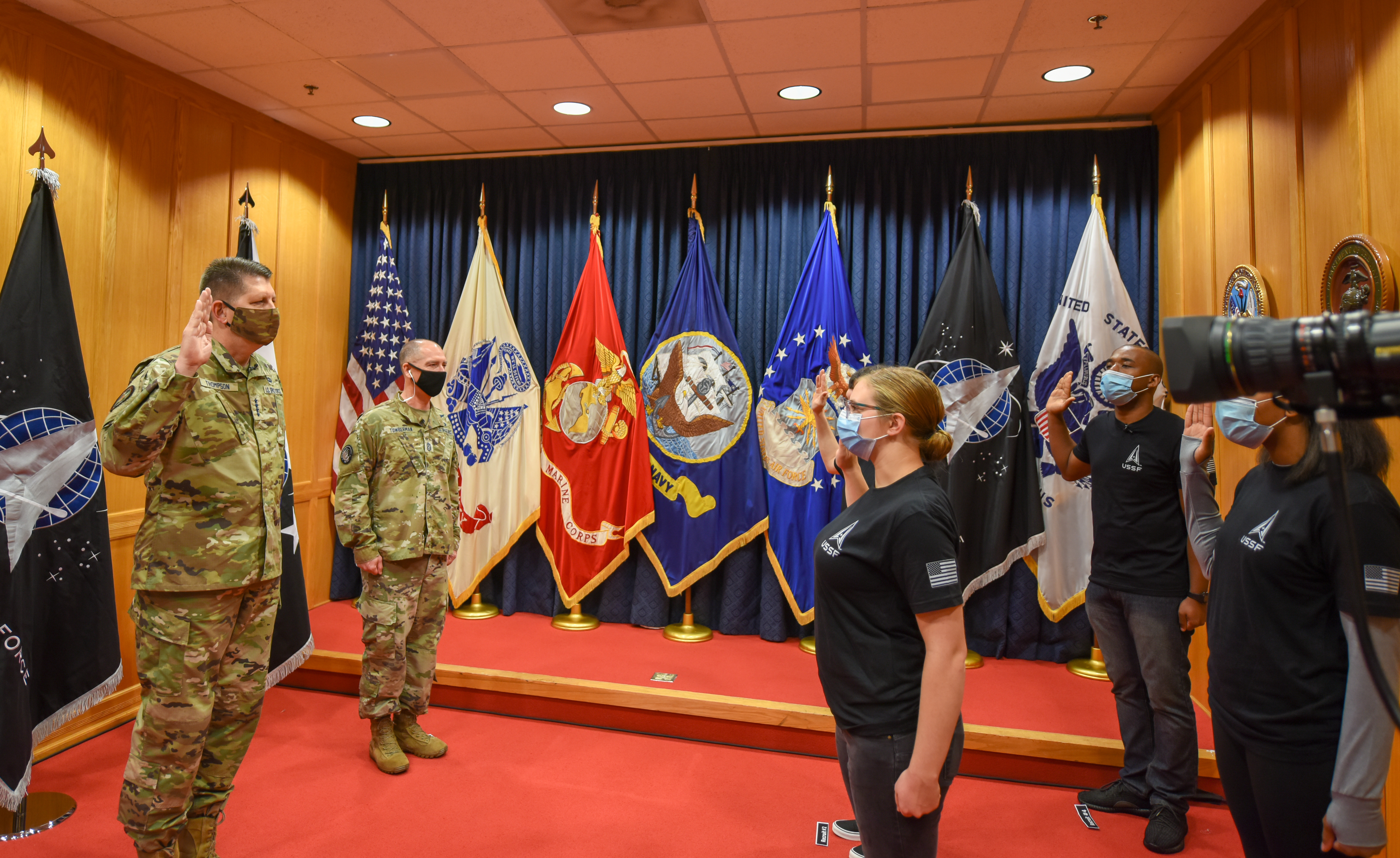
Vice Chief of Space Operations General David D. Thompson swears in the first four enlisted Space Force recruits (20 October 2020).

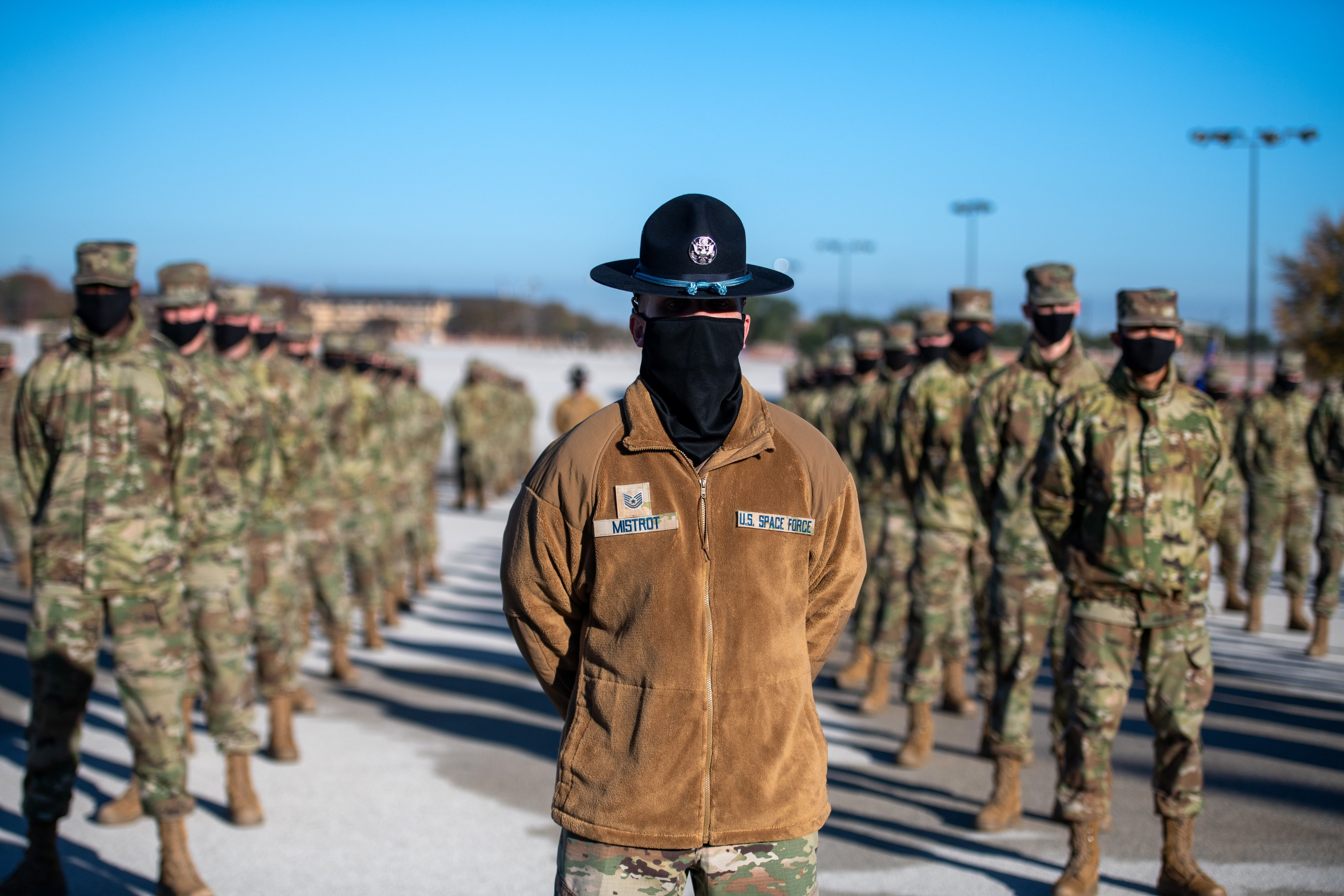
The first seven enlisted guardians graduate from Basic Military Training (10 December 2020).

US DoD pay grade	E-9 Special (Note: SEAC and CMSSF have E-9 pay grades but are given unique pay.)		E-9	E-8	E-7	E-6	E-5	E-4	E-3	E-2	E-1
NATO code	OR-9			OR-8	OR-7	OR-6	OR-5	OR-4	OR-3	OR-2	OR-1
Insignia
Title	Senior Enlisted Advisor to the Chairman	Chief Master Sergeant of the Space Force	Chief master sergeant	Senior master sergeant	Master sergeant	Technical sergeant	Sergeant	Specialist 4	Specialist 3	Specialist 2	Specialist 1
Abbreviation	SEAC	CMSSF	CMSgt	SMSgt	MSgt	TSgt	Sgt	Spc4	Spc3	Spc2	Spc1

=== Uniforms ===
Air Force Mess Dress Uniform (interim)	Service Dress Uniform Class "A"	Service Uniform Class "B"	Air Force Service Dress Uniform (interim)	OCP Uniform	Physical Training Uniform

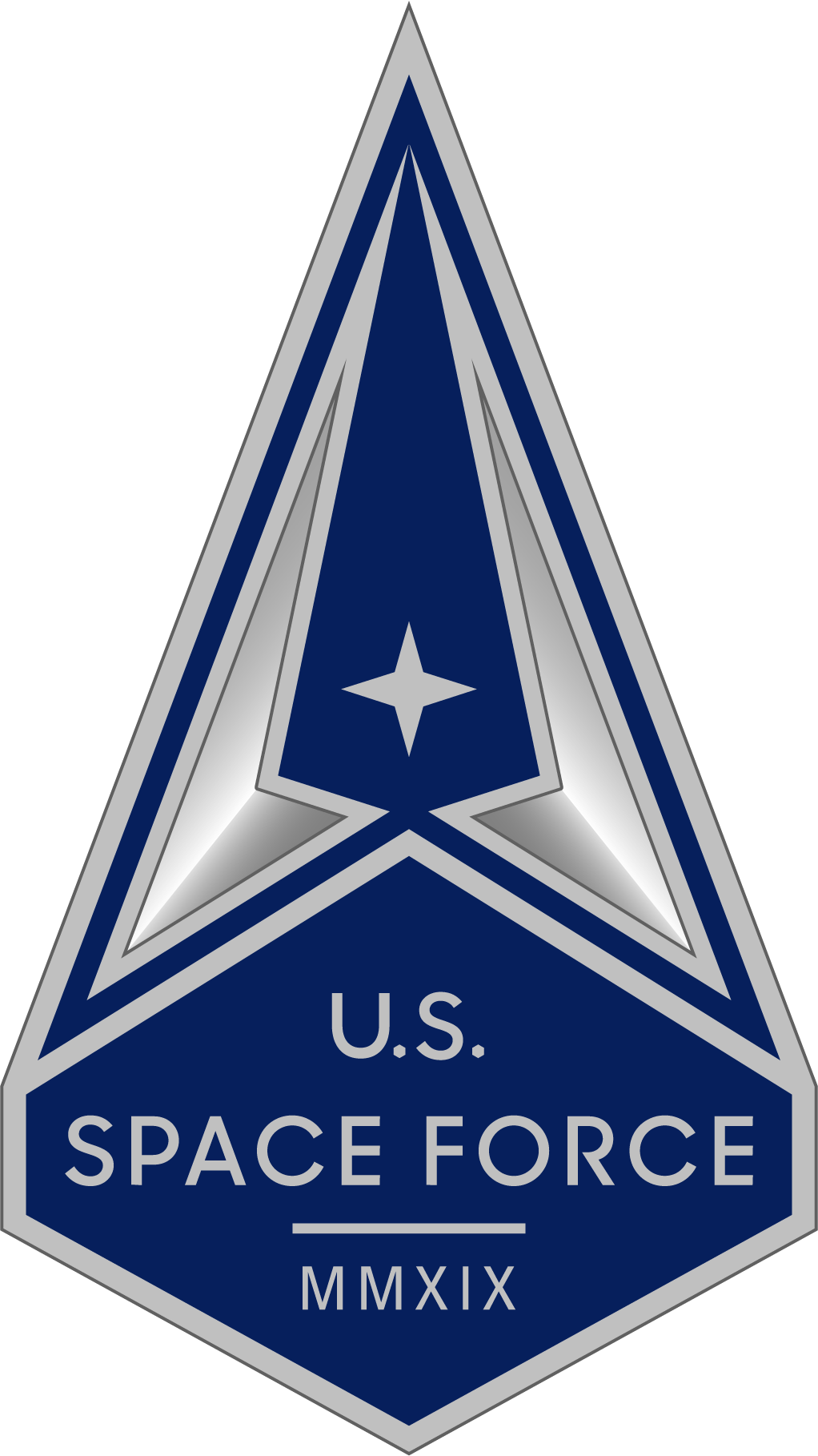
Space Force insignia worn on Air Force uniforms

The Space Force is currently in the process of developing its unique mess dress, service dress, and physical training uniforms. In the interim period, guardians wear the Air Force Mess Dress, Air Force Service Dress, and Air Force Service uniforms with the following modifications:

- Space Force insignia on the coat/shirt
- Replaced "Hap Arnold Star & Wings" buttons with "Delta, Globe, & Orbit" buttons
- Replaced Air Force Great Seal of the United States service cap badges with Space Force Delta, Globe, and Orbit service cap badges
- Replaced Air Force nametag with Space Force hexagonal nametag
- Space Force enlisted rank worn in place of Air Force enlisted ranks (enlisted only)
- Replaced circle U.S. lapel insignia with hexagonal U.S. insignia (enlisted only)

The primary Space Force uniform is the OCP Uniform, adopted from the U.S. Air Force and the U.S. Army. The Space Force uses unique "space blue" thread for ranks and badges, wears a full color flag on the left sleeve, and wears full color patches.

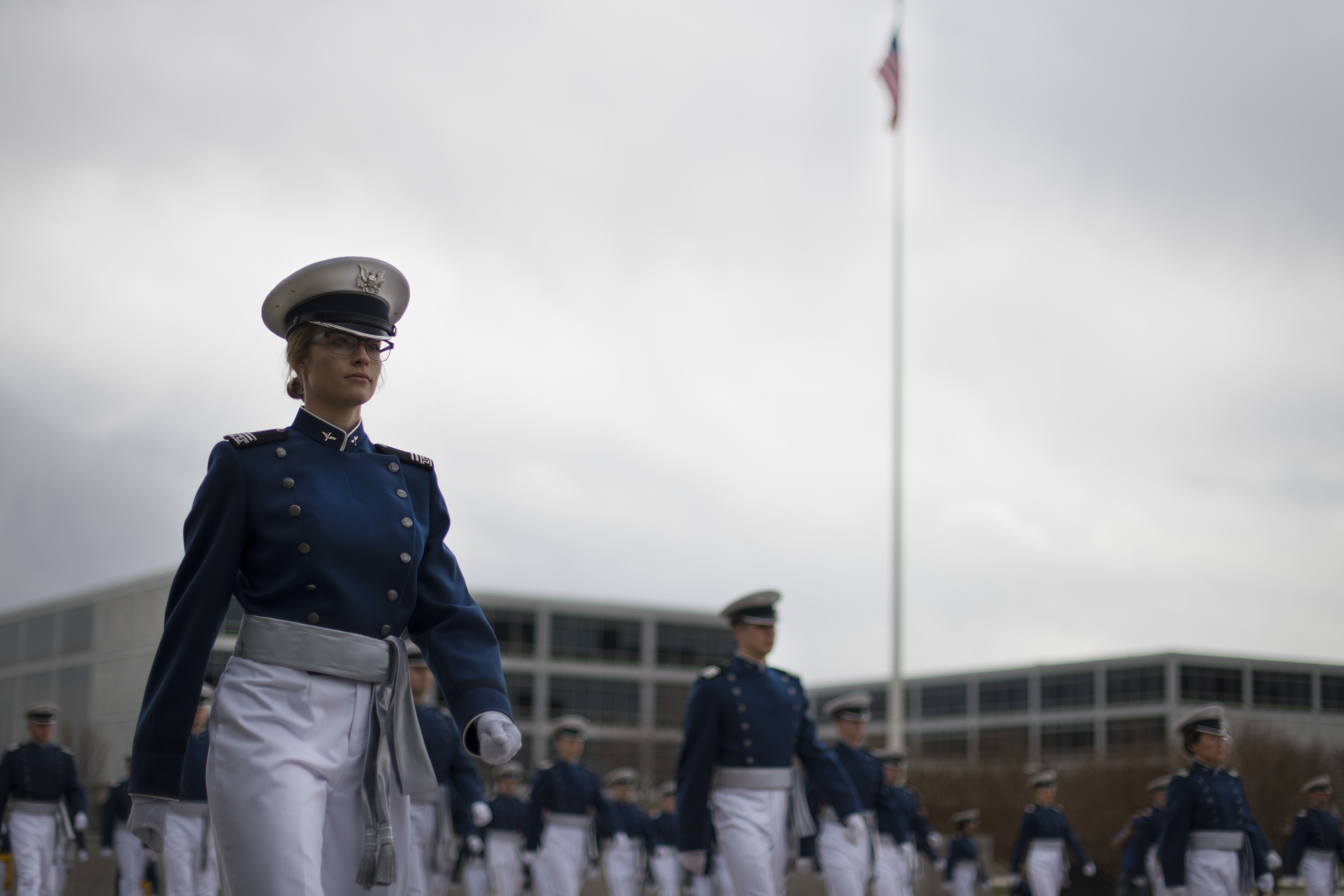
Space Force cadets in Air Force Academy parade dress with their platinum sashes

The Space Force's distinctive blue and gray service dress uniform was unveiled at the Air & Space Forces Association's 2021 Air, Space, and Cyber conference. The dark blue was taken from the Space Force's seal and represents the vastness of outer space, while the six buttons represent that the U.S. Space Force is the sixth armed service. The Space Force's Physical Training Uniform was unveiled in September 2021. As of April 2023, the Space Force stated that the Physical Training Uniform would be available by early 2024 and that the Service Dress Uniform would be available by late 2025. The official uniform was unveiled on January 13, 2026, but a mandatory wear date has yet to be set.

Space Force cadets at the Air Force Academy wear the same uniform as Air Force cadets; however, in their distinctive blue and white parade dress uniforms they wear a platinum sash in place of the gold sash worn by Air Force cadets.

=== Awards and decorations ===
Ribbons for the proposed Guardian of the Year Ribbon

As part of the United States Department of the Air Force, the United States Space Force and United States Air Force share the same awards and decorations or same variations of awards and decorations.

On 16 November 2020, the Secretary of the Air Force Frank Kendall III renamed the Air Force Commendation Medal, the Air Force Achievement Medal, Air Force Outstanding Unit Award, Air Force Organizational Excellence Award, Air Force Recognition Ribbon, Air Force Overseas Ribbons, Air Force Expeditionary Service Ribbon, Air Force Longevity Service Award, and the Air Force Training Ribbon to replace "Air Force" with "Air and Space" to include the Space Force. He also eliminated Air Force from the Air Force Combat Action Medal and renamed the Air Force Special Duty Ribbon to the Developmental Special Duty Ribbon.

The Space Force is currently in the process of developing a Space Force Good Conduct Medal to replace the Air Force Good Conduct Medal for enlisted members which was approved on 30 August 2023. Congress has also debated changing the Airman's Medal, awarded for non-combat heroism, to the Air and Space Force Medal, mirroring the Navy and Marine Corps Medal.

Devices
Arctic "A" Device	Arrowhead Device	Combat "C" Device	Oak leaf cluster	Remote "R" device	Service Star	Valor "V" Device

==== Decorations ====
Medal of Honor	Air Force Cross	Distinguished Service Medal	Silver Star Medal	Legion of Merit	Distinguished Flying Cross	Airman's Medal	Bronze Star Medal	Purple Heart	Meritorious Service Medal	Air Medal	Aerial Achievement Medal	Air and Space Commendation Medal	Air and Space Achievement Medal

==== Unit awards ====
Presidential Unit Citation	Gallant Unit Citation	Meritorious Unit Award	Air and Space Outstanding Unit Award	Air and Space Organizational Excellence Award

==== Campaign, expeditionary, and service awards ====
Combat Action Medal	Combat Readiness Medal	Space Force Good Conduct Medal	Air and Space Recognition Ribbon	Remote Combat Effects Campaign Medal	Air and Space Campaign Medal	Nuclear Deterrence Operations Service Medal	Air and Space Overseas Service Ribbon (Short Tour)	Air and Space Overseas Service Ribbon (Long Tour)	Air and Space Expeditionary Service Ribbon	Air and Space Longevity Service Award	Developmental Special Duty Ribbon	Air Force Enlisted Professional Military Education Graduate Ribbon	Basic Military Training Honor Graduate Ribbon	Small Arms Expert Marksmanship Ribbon	Air and Space Training Ribbon

== Spacecraft and space systems ==
=== Spacecraft ===
U.S. Space Force spacecraft
Name	Spacecraft image	Mission	Operator	Number
Advanced Extremely High Frequency (AEHF)		Satellite communications	Space Delta 8	6
Advanced Technology Risk Reduction (ATRR)		Space surveillance	Space Delta 9	1
Defense Meteorological Satellite Program (DMSP)		Environmental monitoring	Mission Delta 2	4
Defense Satellite Communications System (DSCS)		Satellite communications	Space Delta 8	6
Defense Support Program (DSP)		Missile warning	Mission Delta 4	
Electro-optical/Infrared Weather System – Geosynchronous (EWS-G)		Environmental monitoring	Mission Delta 2	
Fleet Satellite Communications System (FLTSAT)		Satellite communications	Space Delta 8	
Global Positioning System (GPS)		Positioning, navigation, and timing	Mission Delta 31	32
Geosynchronous Space Situational Awareness Program (GSSAP)		Space surveillance	Space Delta 9	6
Milstar		Satellite communications	Space Delta 8	5
Mobile User Objective System (MUOS)		Satellite communications	Space Delta 8	
Operationally Responsive Space-5 (ORS-5)		Space surveillance	Space Delta 9	1
Space-Based Infrared System (SBIRS)		Missile warning Missile defense Battlespace awareness Technical intelligence	Mission Delta 4	7
Space Based Space Surveillance (SBSS)		Space surveillance	Space Delta 9	1
Ultra High Frequency Follow-On (UFO)		Satellite communications	Space Delta 8	
Wideband Global SATCOM (WGS)		Satellite communications	Space Delta 8	10
X-37B Orbital Test Vehicle		Orbital test spaceplane	Space Delta 9	2

=== Space systems ===
U.S. Space Force space systems
Name	Space system image	Mission	Operator
AN/FPS-85		Space surveillance	Mission Delta 2
C-Band Space Surveillance Radar System		Space surveillance	Mission Delta 2
Cobra Dane		Missile defense Space surveillance	Mission Delta 4
Ground-Based Electro-Optical Deep Space Surveillance (GEODSS)		Space surveillance	Mission Delta 2
Long Range Discrimination Radar (LRDR)		Missile defense Space surveillance	Mission Delta 4
Perimeter Acquisition Radar Attack Characterization System (PARCS)		Missile warning Space surveillance	Mission Delta 4
Satellite Control Network (SCN)		Ground station	Space Delta 6
Space Fence		Space surveillance	Mission Delta 2
Space Surveillance Telescope		Space surveillance	Mission Delta 2
Upgraded Early Warning Radar (UEWR)		Missile warning Missile defense Space surveillance	Mission Delta 4

=== Space launch vehicles ===
U.S. Space Force contracted space launch vehicles
Name	Space launch vehicle image	Class	Contractor
Atlas V		Medium-lift launch vehicle	United Launch Alliance
Electron		Small-lift launch vehicle	Rocket Lab
Falcon 9		Medium to Heavy-lift launch vehicle	SpaceX
Falcon Heavy		Heavy to Super heavy-lift launch vehicle	SpaceX
Pegasus		Air launched small-lift launch vehicle	Northrop Grumman

=== Space weapons ===
The Air Force Secretary, Troy Meink, disclosed at an Air & Space Forces Association conference on September 14, 2026, that the United States had already deployed via the U.S. Space Force active "on-orbit space control weapons capable of defending the joint force against hostile adversary action".

== Modernization and budget ==
United States Space Force budget	2020	2021	2022	2023	2024	2025	2026 (requested)
Operation & maintenance	$40,000,000	$2,492,114,000	$3,611,012,000	$4,086,883,000	~$4,900,000,000	~$5,300,000,000	~$5,800,000,000
Procurement	—	$2,310,994,000	$2,787,354,000	$4,462,188,000	~$4,700,000,000	~$4,300,000,000	~$3,700,000,000
Research, development, test & evaluation	—	$10,540,069,000	$11,794,566,000	$16,631,377,000	~$18,670,000,000	~$18,700,000,000	~$29,000,000,000*
Military personnel	—	—	—	$1,109,400,000	~$1,200,000,000	~$1,200,000,000	~$1,400,000,000
Total	$40,000,000	$15,343,177,000	$18,192,932,000	$26,289,848,000	~$29,500,000,000	$28,700,000,000	~$39,900,000,000†

- *The 2026 RDT&E request includes $13.5 billion in mandatory funding proposed through reconciliation, significantly inflating this category compared to previous years.
- †The 2026 Total represents the combined baseline and reconciliation request (~$40 billion). The baseline appropriation request alone is approximately $26.3 billion.

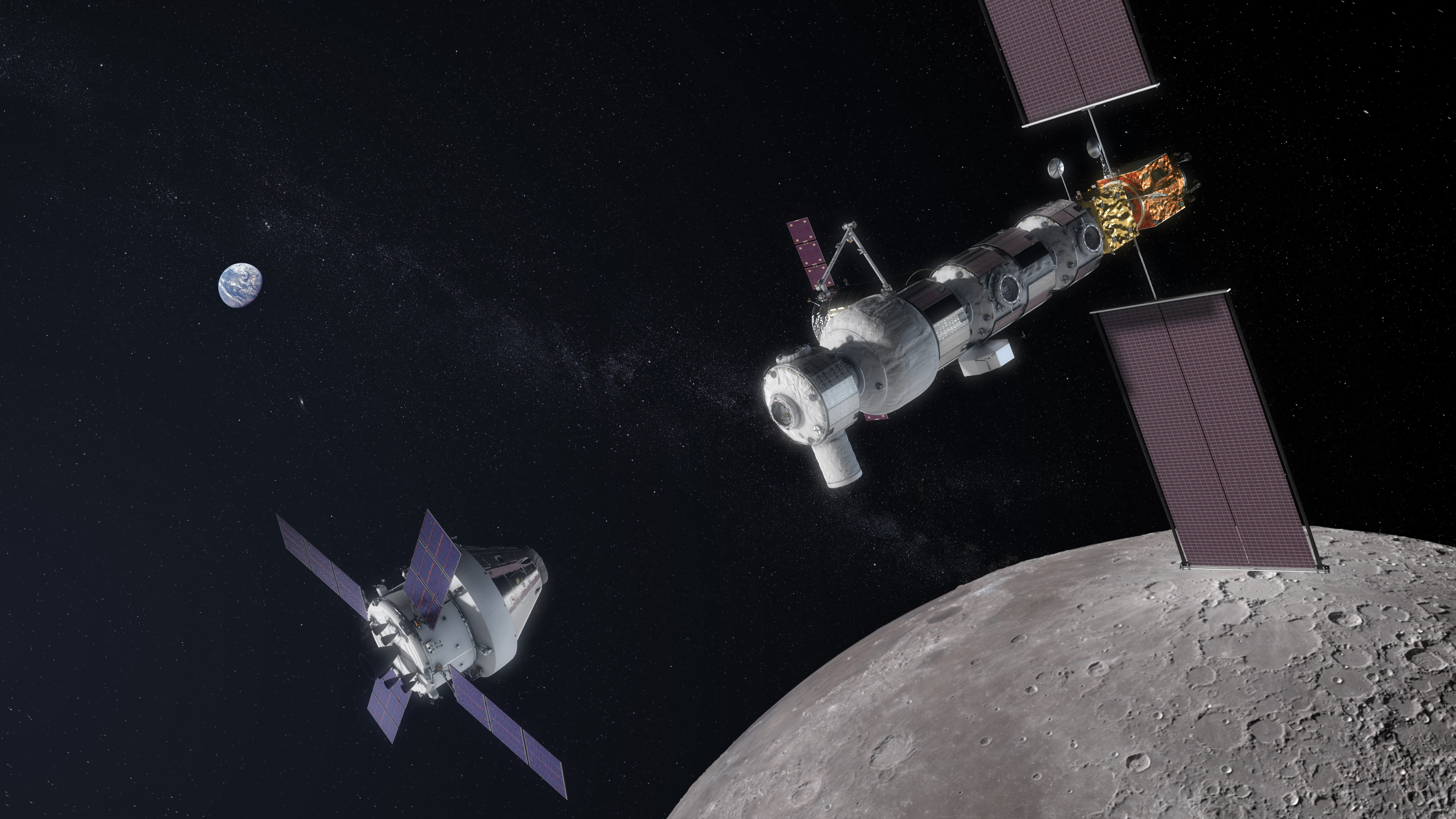
NASA's return to the Moon through the Artemis program is leading to a greater emphasis on cislunar domain awareness.

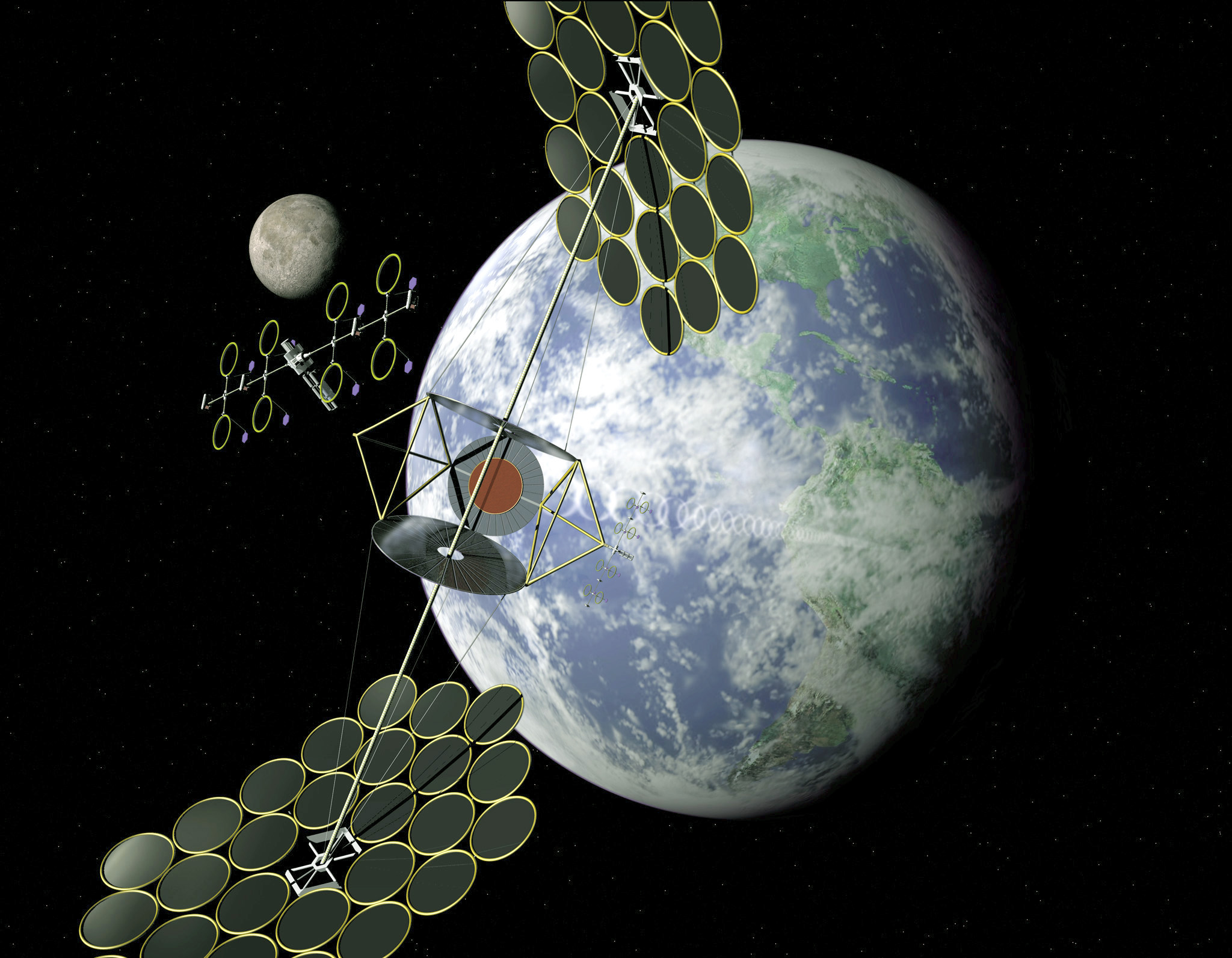
Concept for a space-based solar power spacecraft

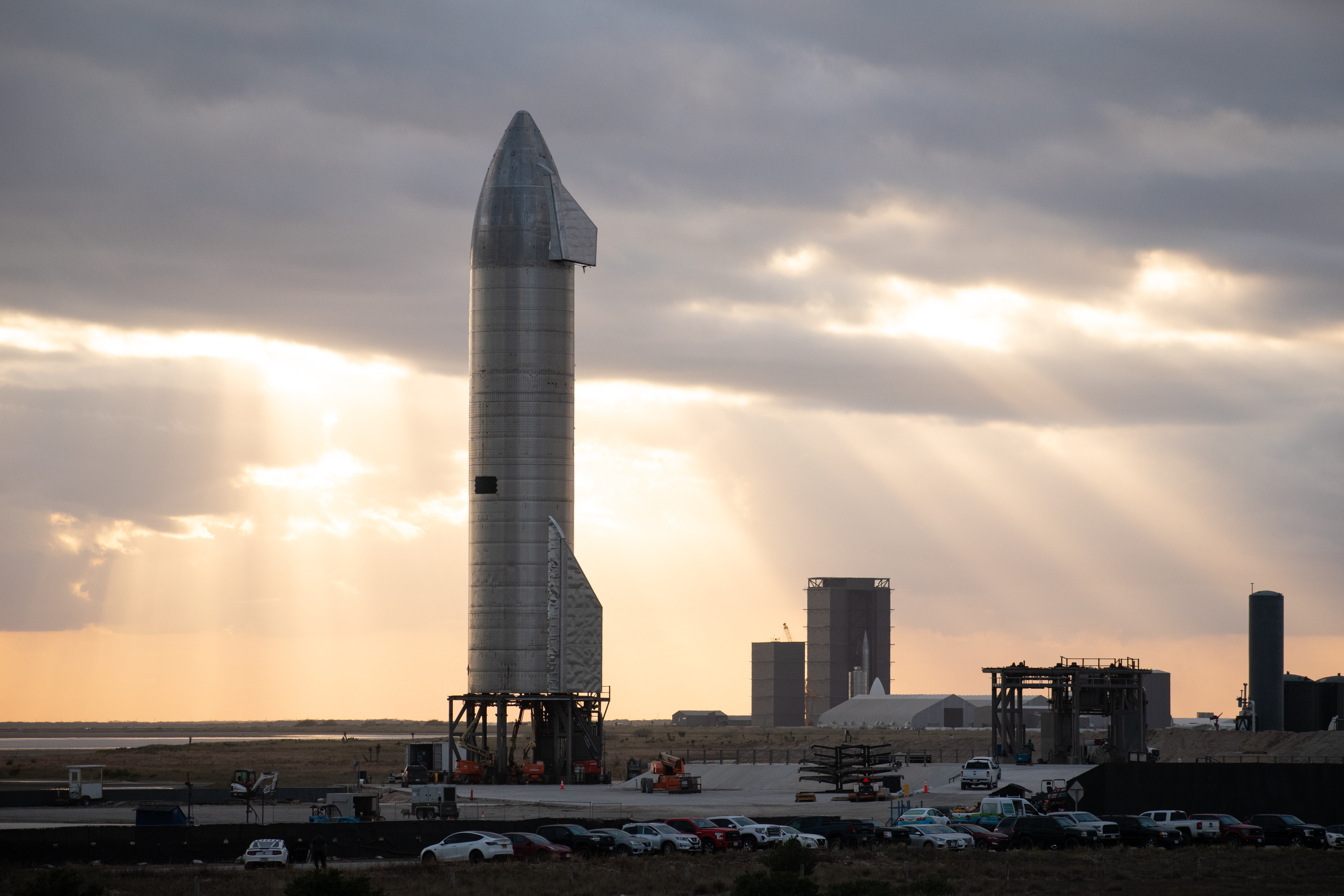
SpaceX's Starship, a contender for the Rocket Cargo program

While a new service, the U.S. Space Force is undergoing intensive modernization efforts. The Deep Space Advanced Radar Capability (DARC) is intended to track objects in geosynchronous orbit with three sites, one in the United States, one in the Indo-Pacific, and one in Europe.

Oracle, a spacecraft developed by the Air Force Research Laboratory for the Space Force, will demonstrate technologies that the space service needs for cislunar domain awareness – tracking objects outside of geosynchronous orbit and between Earth and the Moon. The spacecraft itself will launch to an area of gravitational stability between the Earth and the Moon to conduct operations, using a wide-field sensor and a more sensitive narrow field sensor to discover and maintain custody of objects operating in this region. Oracle will directly support NASA's Artemis program as it returns to the Moon and track potentially hazardous near-Earth objects in support of planetary defense operations.

Also an Air Force Research Laboratory program for the Space Force, Arachne is the keystone experiment in the Space Solar Power Incremental Demonstrations and Research Project, which aims to prove and mature essential technologies for a prototype space-based solar power transmission system capable of powering a forward operating base. Arachne will specifically demonstrate and mature technologies related to more efficient energy generation, radio frequency forming, and radio frequency beam beaming. Current forward operation bases rely on significant logistics convoys to transport fuel for power – space-based solar power would move these supply lines to space, where they are unable to be easily attacked. Much like how GPS started as a military program and was opened to civilian use, Space Force-provided space-based solar power could transition to common use as well. Other space-based power beaming demonstrators include the Space Power InfraRed Regulation and Analysis of Lifetime (SPIRRAL) and Space Power INcremental DepLoyable Experiment (SPINDLE) experiments.

The Navigation Technology Satellite-3 (NTS-3), building on the Space Force's Global Positioning System constellation, is an Air Force Research Laboratory spacecraft that will operate in geosynchronous orbit to test advanced techniques and technologies to detect and mitigate interference to positioning, navigation, and timing capabilities and increase system resiliency for military, civil, and commercial users. NTS-3 is a Vanguard program, which mark potentially game changing technologies.

The Space Force's Rocket Cargo program is another Air Force Research Laboratory Vanguard program, which is focused on leasing space launch services to quickly transport military materiel to ports across the globe. If proven viable, the Space Force's Space Systems Command is responsible for transitioning it to a program of record. United States Transportation Command would be the primary user of this capability, rapidly launching up to 100 tons of cargo anywhere in the world.

== See also ==
- National Security Space Launch
- List of USSF launches
- Air & Space Forces Association
- Militarization of space
- List of space forces, units, and formations
- Space National Guard
- Space Force Association
- Starlink in the Russo-Ukrainian War
- Strategic Defense Initiative
- Women in the United States Space Force

== Bibliography ==
- Hardwick, C. Stuart, ed. (2024). Tales of the United States Space Force. Riverdale, NY: Baen Books. ISBN 978-1-9821-9345-4. OCLC 1405189278. Anthology of fiction and nonfiction about the U.S. Space Force.
