= 319th Combat Training Squadron =

U.S. Space Force unit

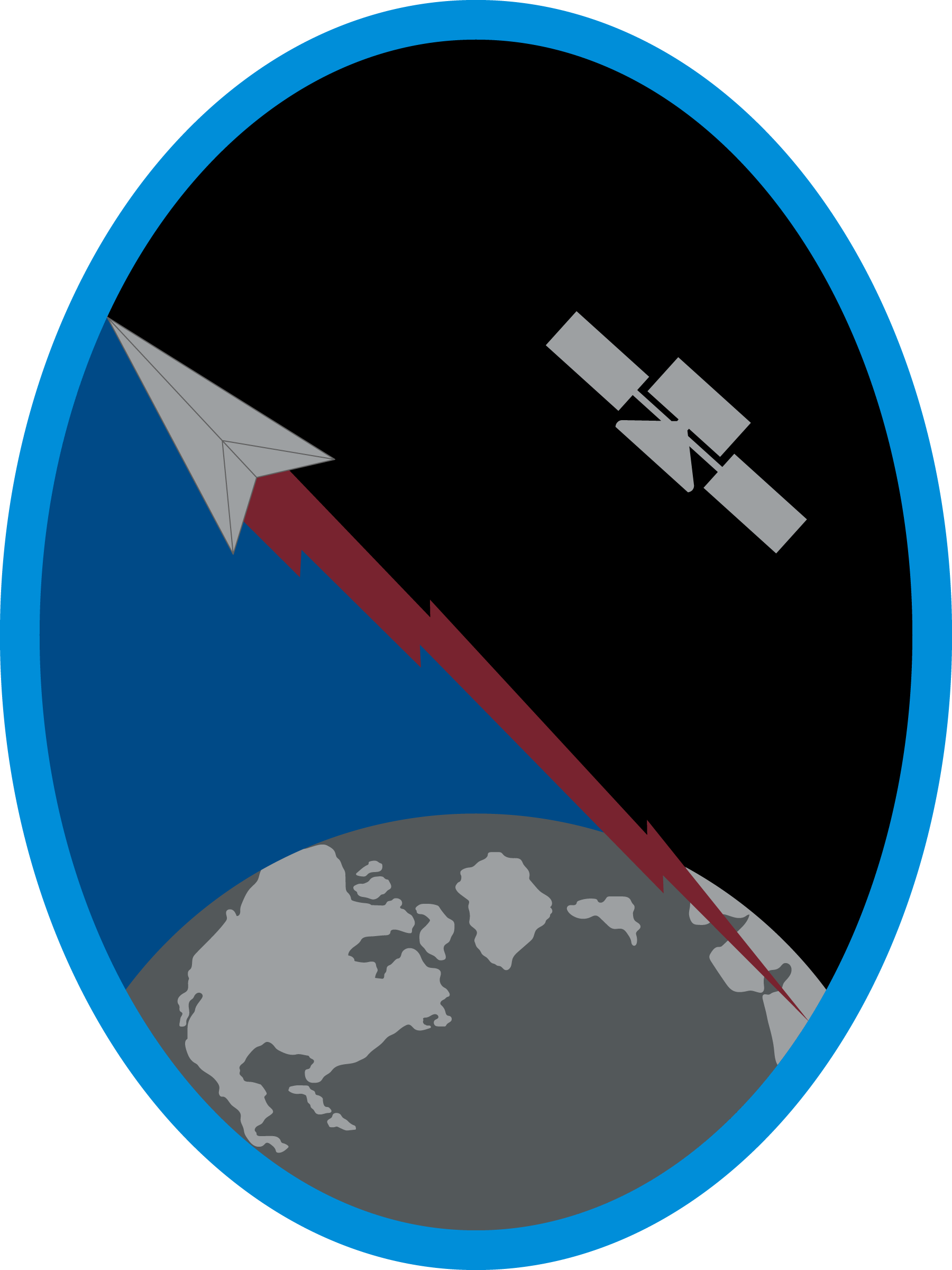
- Squadron emblem
- Active: Deactivated (7 years, 9 months) as 319th CTS Detailed: 1987–1993; 2001–2026
- Country: United States
- Branch: United States Space Force
- Type: Squadron
- Role: Advanced military space training
- Size: 66 personnel
- Part of: Space Delta 1
- Headquarters: Peterson Space Force Base, Colorado, U.S.
- Motto: "Gateway to the High Frontier"
- Website: www2.peterson.af.mil/asops/CESET/asops/index.htm

Commanders
- Commander: Lt Col Liam "Crab" Conley

Insignia
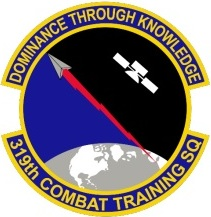
- Former 319th 319th Combat Training Squadron emblem

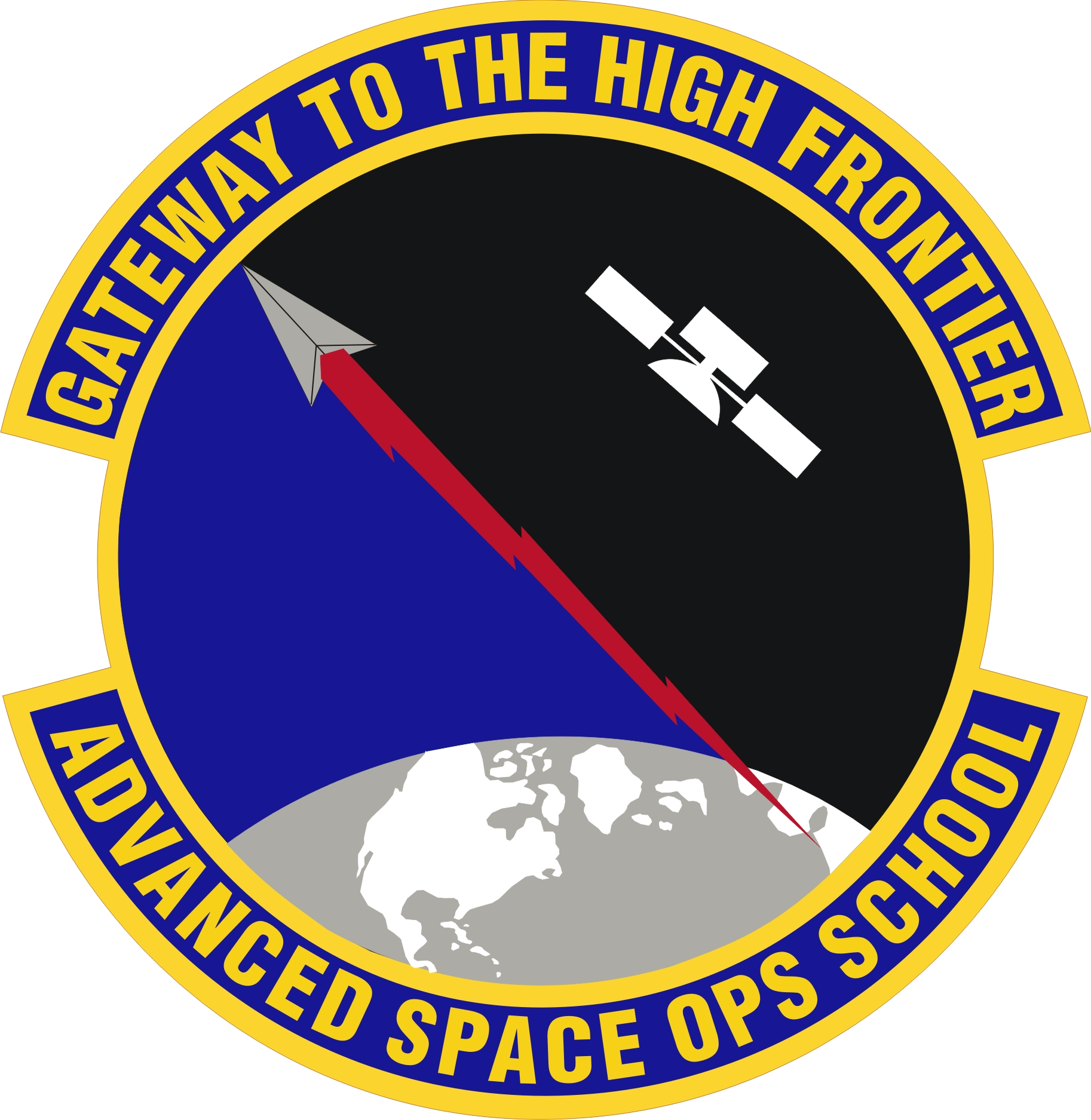
- Advanced Space Operations School emblem

The 319th Combat Training Squadron (319th CTS) was a United States Space Force unit responsible for offering advanced military space training. Assigned to Space Training and Readiness Command's Space Delta 1, it offers space warfighting follow-on courses for the four warfighting disciplines in the Space Force: orbital warfare, space electronic warfare, space battle management, and space access and sustainment. Space operators that recently graduated from the 533rd Training Squadron's undergraduate space training undergo a temporary duty assignment at the squadron to train them based on their specific warfighting discipline. It is located at the Moorman Space Education and Training Center, Peterson Space Force Base, Colorado.

== History ==
The 319th Space Training Squadron is the direct descendant of several space education and training organizations. From 1994 to 1996, the Space Tactics School (STS) which existed from lessons learned in Operation Desert Storm which found that campaign planning had not fully leveraged the nation's space capabilities. The STS initially filled the void, but in 2002 the Space Operations School (SOPSC) stood up to extend beyond the objectives of the STS and filled the breach by teaching broader space concepts and systems. The two schools conducted a thorough examination of how to educationally prepare and train warfighters, and instituted programs that addressed recognized shortfalls.

The Space Commission Report of January 2001 amplified the need for more space education and training, noting the shortfall in growing space professionals at senior leadership echelons. The Commission's report served as a catalyst to help transform the SOPSC into the National Security Space Institute (NSSI) under the Air Force Space Command (AFSPC), which officially activated October 1 October 2004. The NSSI had two main schools, the Space Professional School, which was responsible for the space professional continuing education courses such as Space 200 and Space 300, and the Space Operations School, dedicated to teaching advanced space concepts, deployment training, and instruction to space operations crewmember. In 2007, AFSPC decided to reorganize the NSSI into two schools: the Space Professional School would remain the NSSI and be relocated under Air University and the Space Operations School would be renamed the Advanced Space Operations School (ASOpS) and aligned under the Space Innovation and Development Center (SIDC). On 1 April 2009, the ASOpS was activated taking the lineage of the 319th Space Training Squadron (319 CTS).

In June 2012, the Advanced Space Operations School relocated to a new education and training facility on Peterson Air Force Base, Colorado. In September 2012, the new facility was dedicated to General Thomas S. Moorman Jr. and was renamed The Moorman Space Education and Training Center. In 2013, the school realigned under AFSPC’s Directorate of Operations and Communications (A3).

The United States Space Force was established in 2019 partly to consolidate all space education units, including the 319 CTS, into a space-specific service branch. On 24 July 2020, 319 CTS was transferred into the Space Force under Space Operations Command's Space Training and Readiness Delta (Provisional) (STAR Delta (P)), temporarily consolidating all space education units pending the establishment of the Space Training and Readiness Command (STARCOM). STARCOM was activated on 23 August 2021 following the inactivation of STAR Delta (P), and the 319 CTS was realigned under the newly activated Space Delta 1 (DEL 1).

== Lineage ==
- Activated as 3301st Space Training Squadron on 1 October 1987

Redesignated as 319th Space Training Squadron on 4 January 1993
Inactivated on 1 July 1993

- Constituted as Space Operations School on 2001

Redesignated as Advanced Space Operations School on 20 March 2009
Activated on 1 April 2009
Redesignated as 319th Combat Training Squadron on 28 August 2018

=== Stations ===
- Lowry Air Force Base, 1 October 1987 – 1 July 1993
- Colorado Springs, Colorado, 1 April 2009

=== Assignments ===
- Lowry Training Center, 1 October 1987 – 1 July 1993
- Space Innovation and Development Center, 1 April 2009
- Directorate of Operations and Communications, Air Force Space Command, 2013
- Space Training and Readiness Delta (Provisional), 24 July 2020
- Space Delta 1, 23 August 2021

=== Honors ===
==== Decorations ====
- Air Force Organizational Excellence Award, 1 October 1988 – 30 September 1989

== List of commanders ==
- Lt Col Vincent Cassara, ~2009
- Lt Col Dawn Githens, ~2011
- Lt Col Patrick Long, 21 June 2013
- Lt Col Paul W. Contoveros, July 2017
- Lt Col Daniel Sebeck, 4 July 2019
- Lt Col Adam Howland, 18 June 2021
- Lt Col Ryan J. Pennington, 14 June 2023
- Lt Col Liam Conley, 8 July 2025

== See also ==
- Space Delta 1
- National Security Space Institute
- Space Innovation and Development Center
