= 328th Weapons Squadron =

U.S. Space Force unit

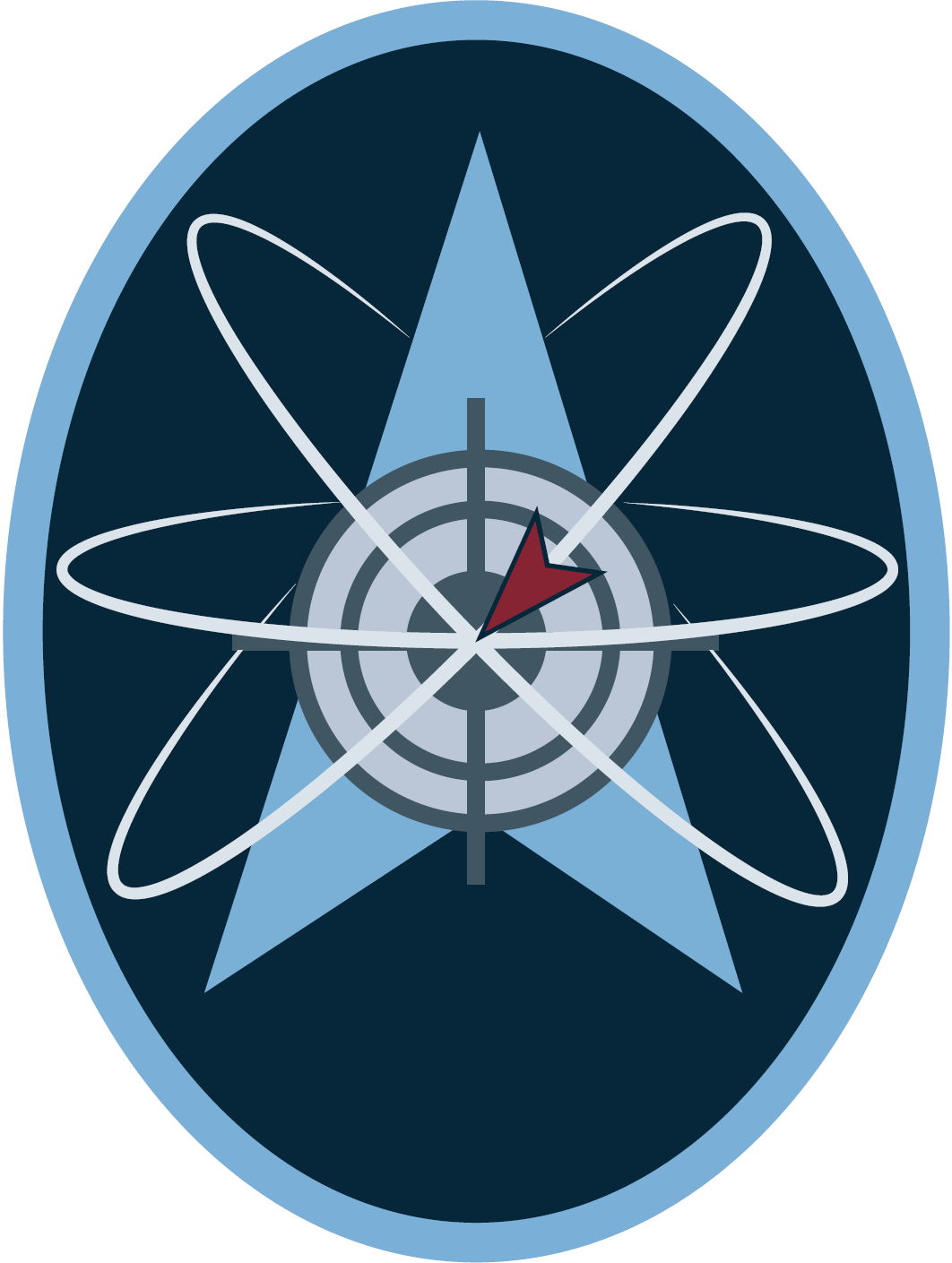
- Squadron emblem
- Active: 1942–1994; 2003–present
- Country: United States
- Branch: United States Space Force
- Type: Squadron
- Role: Space weapons school
- Part of: Space Delta 1
- Headquarters: Nellis Air Force Base, Nevada, U.S.
- Engagements: World War II: American Antisubmarine Theater; EAME Theater; 1991 Gulf War (Defense of Saudi Arabia; Liberation of Kuwait)

- Decorations: Distinguished Unit Citation (2) Air Force Outstanding Unit Award (9)

Commanders
- Commander: Lt Col Shaun Phipps

The 328th Weapons Squadron (328 WPS) is the United States Space Force's weapons school. Assigned to Space Training and Readiness Command's Space Delta 1 and located at Nellis Air Force Base, Nevada, the squadron offers the Space Superiority Weapons Instructor Course and the Space Warfighter Advanced Instructor Course. Students undergo five to six months of rigorous advanced training, after which they become weapons officers, a reservoir of tactical and operational knowledge.

The squadron's origins trace back to the 328th Bombardment Squadron (Heavy) activated on 28 January 1942. The 328th Bombardment Squadron received a Distinguished Unit Citation for its gallantry during the raid on the Ploiești, Romania oil refineries in August 1943. The 328th flew the Boeing B-29 Superfortress, Boeing B-47 Stratojet, Boeing B-50 Superfortress, and Boeing B-52 Stratofortress during the Cold War until its inactivation in 1994.

In 2003, the 328 WPS was turned into a weapon schools unit, offering weapons instructor courses on space superiority. With the establishment of the United States Space Force in 2019, it transferred into the new service and realigned under Space Delta 1.

== Mission ==
The 328 WPS was one of the twenty-one squadrons at the United States Air Force Weapons School. The squadron is one of the largest squadrons within the USAF Weapons School and manages two separate syllabi: the Space Superiority Weapons Instructor Course (WIC) and the Space Warfighter Advanced Instructor Course (AIC). The squadron transferred to the United States Space Force in 2020.

To complete the 328 WPS courses, students must finish a curriculum, which includes 440 hours of academics, 10 hours of device training, 422 hours of mission planning, 48 hours of mission execution, and 24 hours of examination for a total of more than 940 hours. They also have to write a 15-20 page graduate-level paper addressing a current tactical issue and solution. After which, the course culminates in a block known as integration.

The process of selecting weapons school students, at least prior to the establishment of the Space Force, starts from the Air Force Space Command, which calls for nominations from interested eligible officers. The nominations are filtered through the various wing commanders of the major command and a selection board is convened to process the applications.

== History ==
=== World War II ===
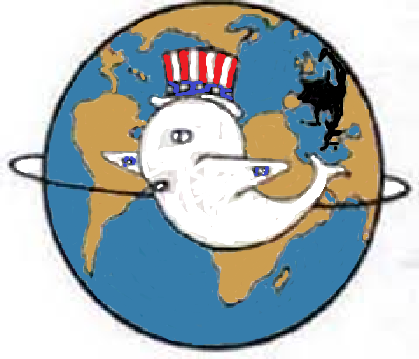
328th Bombardment Squadron emblem (c. 1943)

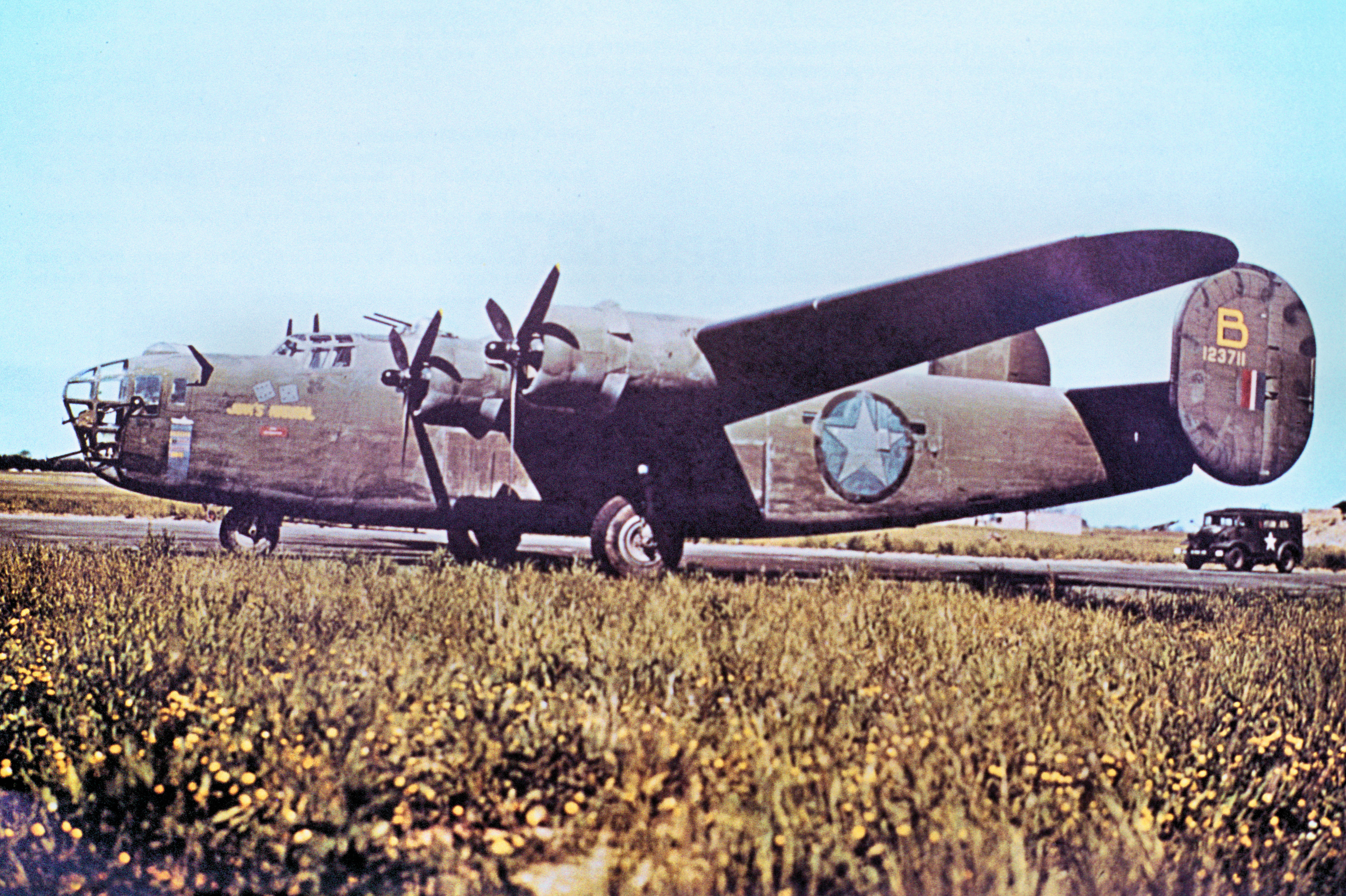
328th Bomb Squadron Consolidated B-24D-1-CO Liberator Serial 41-23711 "'Jerks Natural". This aircraft was lost over Austria on 1 October 1943. MACR 3301

The 328th Bombardment Squadron (Heavy) was established in early 1942 initially as a Consolidated B-24 Liberator reconnaissance squadron, flying antisubmarine patrols. The squadron later trained under Third Air Force in Florida. After completing training in late 1942, the squadron deployed to the European theater of operations as one of the initial heavy bomber squadrons assigned to VIII Bomber Command in England, September 1942.

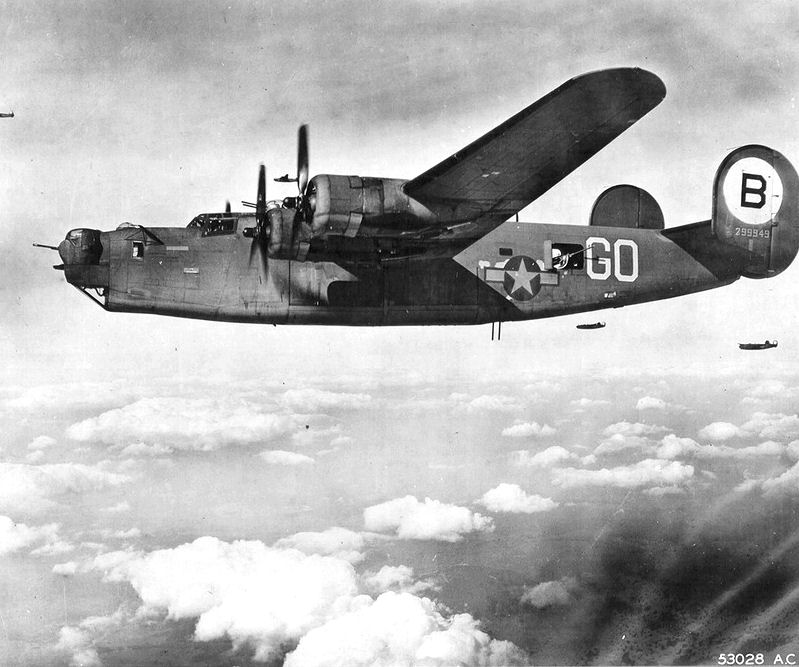
328th Bomb Sq B-24 Liberator (Note: Aircraft is Consolidated B-24J-55-CO Liberator serial 42-99949 on a mission to Friedrichshafen Germany on 14 August 1944. This plane was lost on 21 September 1944 in a mid-air collision with B-24H serial 42-94969) from the 330th Bombardment Squadron. Both planes crashed near Ingelmunster, Belgium.)

The squadron engaged in long-range strategic bombardment operations over Occupied Europe. Deployed to IX Bomber Command in Egypt in December 1942, it operated from airfields in Libya and Tunisia. The squadron raided enemy military and industrial targets in Italy and in the southern Balkans, including the Nazi-controlled oilfields at Ploiești, Romania, receiving a Distinguished Unit Citation for its gallantry in that raid. The squadron also flew tactical bombing raids against Afrika Korps defensive positions in Tunisia, supporting the British Eighth Army forces in their advance to Tunis, in September and October 1943.

The squadron returned to England with the disestablishment of IX Bomber Command in North Africa. From England, it resumed long-range strategic bombardment raids on Occupied Europe and Nazi Germany, attacking enemy military and industrial targets as part of the United States' air offensive. The squadron was one of the most highly decorated units in the Eighth Air Force, continuing offensive attacks until the German capitulation in May 1945.

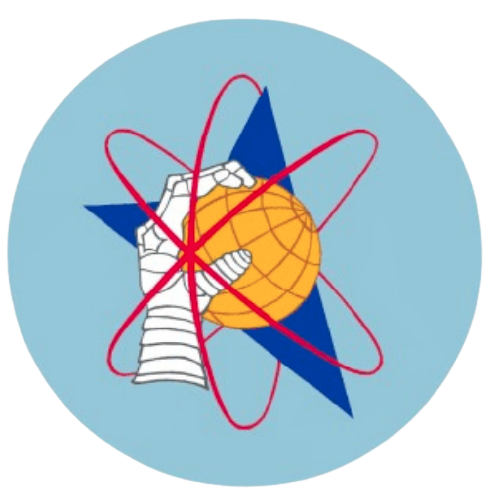
328th Bombardment Squadron emblem, 1955.

In June 1945, the squadron returned to the United States, being remanned and re-equipped with Boeing B-29 Superfortress heavy bombers. It was trained for deployment to the Central Pacific area to carry out very long-range strategic bombing raids over Japan. Japanese capitulation in August canceled plans for deployment, it instead became a Continental Air Forces (later Strategic Air Command) B-29 squadron.

=== Cold War ===
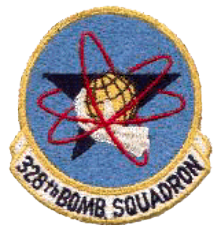
328th Bomb Squadron patch

During the Cold War, the squadron was equipped with new weapons systems as they became available, performing strategic bombardment training with the Boeing B-50 Superfortress, an advanced version of the B-29 in 1950. The B-50 gave the unit the capability to carry heavy loads of conventional weapons faster and farther as well as being designed for atomic bomb missions if necessary.

By 1951, the emergence of the Soviet MiG-15 interceptor in the skies over North Korea signaled the end of the propeller-driven B-50 as a first-line strategic bomber. The squadron received Boeing B-47 Stratojet jet bombers in 1954. In 1955, it began receiving an early model of the Boeing B-52 Stratofortress and upgraded to various models over the next 40 years. Taken off nuclear alert after the end of the Cold War, the squadron was inactivated in 1994 with the inactivation of its parent unit and the closing of Castle Air Force Base.

The squadron deployed aircraft and personnel to the 1708th Provisional Bombardment Wing at Prince Abdullah Air Base, Jeddah, Saudi Arabia, from August 1990 and to the 4300th Provisional Bombardment Wing at Diego Garcia Air Base, British Indian Ocean Territories from January 1991 for Operation Desert Storm. Both deployments terminated in March 1991.

=== Weapons school ===
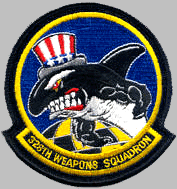
Former 328th Weapons Squadron emblem.

The Air Force Weapons School's Space Division was activated in July 1996. In 2003, the Weapons School restructured its units, turning their divisions into squadrons with lineages of a previously highly decorated notable inactivated unit. So, on 3 February 2003, the Space Division was replaced by the 328th Weapons Squadron on 3 February 2003. The unit has graduated over 350 weapons officers.

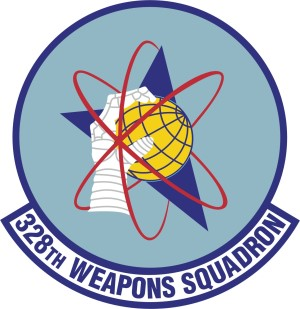
Former 328th Weapons Squadron emblem. (Note: in use until transfer to the Space Force)

In 2012, the 328 WPS stood up the cyber Weapons Instructor Course (cyber WIC) stood up, giving students the opportunity to enhance their cyber skills while under the mentorship of space weapons officers. In 2018, the cyber WIC separated to become their own squadron, the 32nd Weapons Squadron.

The United States Space Force was established in 2019 partly to integrate different space organizations into a space-specific service branch, including space education units in the Air Force. The 328 WPS was one of 23 Air Force units identified to transfer into the Space Force in March 2020. On 24 July 2020, 328 WPS was transferred into the Space Force under Space Operations Command's Space Training and Readiness Delta (Provisional) (STAR Delta (P)), temporarily consolidating all space education units pending the establishment of the Space Training and Readiness Command (STARCOM). STARCOM was activated on 23 August 2021 following the inactivation of STAR Delta (P), and the 319 CTS was realigned under the newly activated Space Delta 1 (DEL 1).

== Lineage ==
- Constituted as the 328th Bombardment Squadron (Heavy) on 28 January 1942

Activated on 1 March 1942
Redesignated 328th Bombardment Squadron, Heavy on 20 August 1943
Redesignated 328th Bombardment Squadron, Very Heavy on 23 May 1945
Redesignated 328th Bombardment Squadron, Medium on 28 May 1948
Redesignated 328th Bombardment Squadron, Heavy on 1 February 1955
Redesignated 328th Bomb Squadron on 1 September 1991
Inactivated on 15 June 1994

- Redesignated 328th Weapons Squadron on 24 January 2003

Activated on 3 February 2003

=== Assignments ===
- 93d Bombardment Group, 1 March 1942 (attached to 93d Bombardment Wing after 10 February 1951)
- 93d Bombardment Wing, 16 June 1952
- 93d Operations Group, 1 September 1991 – 15 June 1994
- USAF Weapons School, 3 February 2003 – 24 July 2020
- Space Training and Readiness Delta (Provisional), 24 July 2020 – 23 August 2021
- Space Delta 1, 23 August 2021 – present

=== Stations ===
- Barksdale Field, Louisiana, 1 March 1942
- Page Field, Florida, 18 May-13 August 1942
- RAF Alconbury (AAF-102), (Note: Station number in Anderson.) England, 7 September 1942
- RAF Hardwick (AAF-104), England, c. 6 December 1942 – 15 June 1945

Air echelon operated from Tafaraoui Airfield, Algeria, 7–15 December 1942, RAF Gambut, Libya, 16 December 1942 – 25 February 1943, Benghazi Airport, Libya, 27 June–25 August 1943, Oudna Airfield, Tunisia, 18 September–3 October 1943

- Sioux Falls Army Air Field, South Dakota, 26 June 1945
- Pratt Army Air Field, Kansas, 24 July 1945
- Clovis Army Air Field, New Mexico, 13 December 1945
- Castle Field (later Castle Air Force Base), California, 21 June 1946 – 15 June 1994
- Nellis Air Force Base, Nevada, 3 February 2003 – present

=== Aircraft operated ===
- Consolidated B-24 Liberator (1942–1945)
- Boeing B-29 Superfortress (1945–1949)
- Boeing B-50 Superfortress (1949–1954)
- Boeing B-47 Stratojet (1954–1955)
- Boeing B-52B Stratofortress (1955–1965)
- Boeing B-52D Stratofortress (1956–1958)
- Boeing B-52E Stratofortress (1957–1958; 1967–1970)
- Boeing B-52F Stratofortress (1958–1974)
- Boeing B-52G Stratofortress (1966–1967; 1974–1994)
- Boeing B-52H Stratofortress (1974–1993)

== List of commanders ==
- Capt Addison E. Baker, 26 March 1942
- Capt Benjamin F. Riggs, before 19 January 1943
- Capt Joseph H. Tate Jr., 1 March 1943
- Capt Roy G. Martin, c. 15 December 1943
- Maj George O. McCafferty, 26 June 1944
- Maj Wayne M. Beumeler, 11 September 1944
- Maj John R. Dowswell, 26 September 1944
- Capt Earl L. Hehn Jr., c. 15 July 1945
- Maj Clarence J. Jackson, 29 September 1945
- Maj Everett E. Zweifel, August 1947
- Maj Howard E. Brown, October 1947
- Lt Col Jack D. Whitten, unknown
- Lt Col Everette E. Zweifel, by March 1948
- Lt Col Louis S. Sowers, 29 January 1949
- Lt Col William E. Keefer, 19 February 1950
- Lt Col Paul H. Francis, 15 November 1950
- Lt Col William J. Simons, 1 September 1951
- Lt Col Robert G. Smith, 5 June 1953
- Lt Col Kenneth R. Rea, 1 June 1954
- Lt Col Stuart M. Abrams, 26 September 1956
- Lt Col Eldridge Shelton, 18 September 1957
- Lt Col James Q. McColl, 15 November 1958
- Lt Col James H. Morriss, July 1960
- Lt Col Francis J. O'Sullivan, September 1961
- Lt Col Leslie W. Brockwell, January 1964
- Col Franklin G. Rhoades, 1 July 1966
- Col Jesse C. McIntire, by March 1967
- Lt Col Pat H. Bass, October 1968
- Lt Col Laverne L. Berneberg, December 1968
- Lt Col Paul Cottrell, 6 October 1970
- Lt Col William E. Flanigin, 7 October 1970
- Col Jesse C. McIntire, 20 December 1971
- Lt Col Dean O. Gilstrap, 12 July 1972
- Col Michael J. Sverha, 5 February 1973
- Lt Col Rodric J. Himebaugh, 4 February 1974
- Lt Col Charles W. Richey, 1 May 1975
- Lt Col James D. Hoopaw, 13 July 1976
- Lt Col John R. Johnson, 26 July 1977
- Lt Col Stephen C. Musselman, 22 May 1978
- Lt Col Simon A Danigole Jr., 23 July 1979
- Lt Col Steve R. Smith, 6 November 1981
- Lt Col Stuart E. MacTaggart, 26 July 1984
- Lt Col Phillip R. Lumpkin, 29 July 1985
- Lt Col Wallace G. Herzog, 20 August 1986
- Lt Col Stan G. Weir, 19 August 1988
- Lt Col Gregory D. Coffey, 16 February 1990
- Lt Col Jeffrey J. Parker, 1 November 1990
- Lt Col Logan R. Kelly, 7 June 1991
- Lt Col Jerry L. Maxwell, 2 March 1992
- Lt Col Harry B. McCarraher III, 28 January 1994
- Maj Warren Montgomery, 27 May–11 June 1994
- None, 11–15 June 1994
- Lt Col Vincent B. Jefferson, ~2003
- Lt Col Anne M. Konnath, June 2005
- Lt Col Michael Lutton, June 2007
- Lt Col Robert K. Sheehan, ~2009
- Lt Col Bob Reeves, ~2011
- Lt Col Richard L. Bourquin, 18 June 2013
- Lt Col Joel Bieberle, July 2015
- Lt Col Kelly Anderson, 29 June 2017
- Lt Col Jessica Raper, 22 June 2019
- Lt Col Shaun Phipps, June 2021
