= Space Training and Readiness Delta (Provisional) =

U.S. Space Force provisional training and readiness unit

- STAR Delta (P) emblem
- Active: 24 July 2020 - 23 August 2021 (1 year)
- Country: United States
- Branch: United States Space Force
- Type: Delta
- Role: Space training and readiness
- Size: 900 personnel
- Part of: Space Operations Command
- Headquarters: Peterson Space Force Base, Colorado, U.S.
- Mottos: Latin: Si Vis Pacem, Para Bellum, lit. 'If you want peace, prepare for war'

Commanders
- Commander: Col Peter J. Flores
- Senior enlisted leader: CMSgt Charles J. Apodaca

The Space Training and Readiness Delta (Provisional) (STAR Delta (P)) was a United States Space Force unit responsible for the training and education of space professionals, as well as the development of space warfighting doctrine. It was a component of Space Operations Command and was headquartered at Peterson Space Force Base, Colorado.

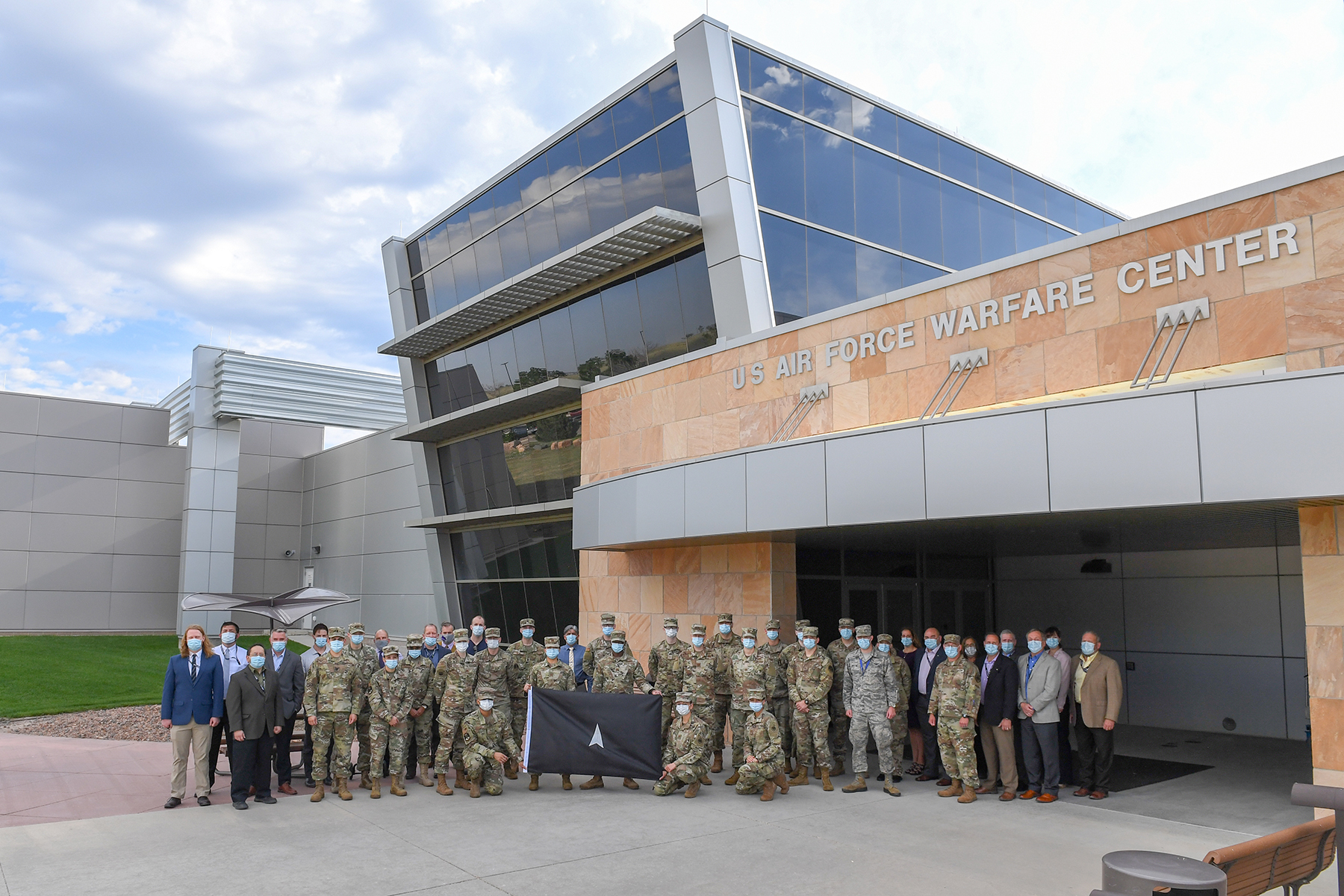
STAR Delta (Provisional)'s first Space Flag exercise.

STAR Delta (P) was activated on 24 July 2020 to serve as the precursor organization to the planned Space Training and Readiness Command (STARCOM). Announced on 30 June 2020 as one of three field commands of the U.S. Space Force, STARCOM was set to be activated in 2021. In the interim, the delta was activated to provide oversight of Space Force education, training, and operational test and evaluation units. It was then inactivated on 23 August 2021 prior to the activation of STARCOM.

== Structure in 2021 ==
Name	Function	Headquarters	Spacecraft	Detachments
Squadrons
3rd Space Experimentation Squadron	Space-based demonstration and experimentation	Schriever Space Force Base, Colorado	Evolved Expendable Launch Vehicle Secondary Payload Adapter Augmented Geosynchronous Laboratory Experiment; Mycroft; Boeing X-37B Orbital Test Vehicle	Operating Location: Kirtland Air Force Base, New Mexico
17th Test Squadron	Operational test	Schriever Space Force Base, Colorado		
25th Space Range Squadron	Space Test and Training Range management	Schriever Space Force Base, Colorado		
319th Combat Training Squadron	Advanced space operations training	Peterson Space Force Base, Colorado		
328th Weapons Squadron	Space Force Weapons School	Nellis Air Force Base, Nevada		
527th Space Aggressor Squadron	Aggressor squadron	Schriever Space Force Base, Colorado		
533rd Training Squadron	Undergraduate space training	Vandenberg Space Force Base, California		
Detachment 1, STAR Delta	Space Force Warfare Center	Schriever Space Force Base, Colorado	Former Detachment 1, United States Air Force Warfare Center	
Operating Location A, STAR Delta	Military simulations and exercises	Schriever Space Force Base, Colorado	Former Operating Location Alpha, 705th Combat Training Squadron	
Detachment 4, STAR Delta	Operational test and evaluation	Peterson Space Force Base, Colorado	Former Detachment 4, Air Force Operational Test and Evaluation Center	
National Security Space Institute	Military space education	Peterson Space Force Base, Colorado		
Forrest L. Vosler Noncommissioned Officer Academy	Enlisted professional military education	Peterson Space Force Base, Colorado		

== List of commanders ==
No.	Commander		Term		
No.	Portrait	Name	Took office	Left office	Term length
1	Peter J. Flores	Colonel; Peter J. Flores	24 July 2020	23 August 2021	1 year, 30 days

== See also ==
- United States Air Force Academy
- Air Education and Training Command
- United States Army Training and Doctrine Command
- United States Marine Corps Training and Education Command
- Naval Education and Training Command
- Space Flag
