= National Security Space Institute =

U.S. Space Force institute

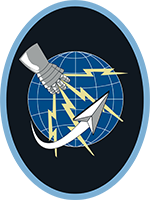
- Institute emblem
- Founded: 28 July 2001; 25 years ago
- Country: United States
- Branch: United States Space Force
- Role: Military space education
- Size: 2500+ students annually
- Part of: Space Delta 13
- Headquarters: Peterson Space Force Base, Colorado, U.S.
- Website: nssi.space

Commanders
- Commandant: Col Albert Harris
- Senior enlisted leader: MSgt Lynette Calleiro

Insignia
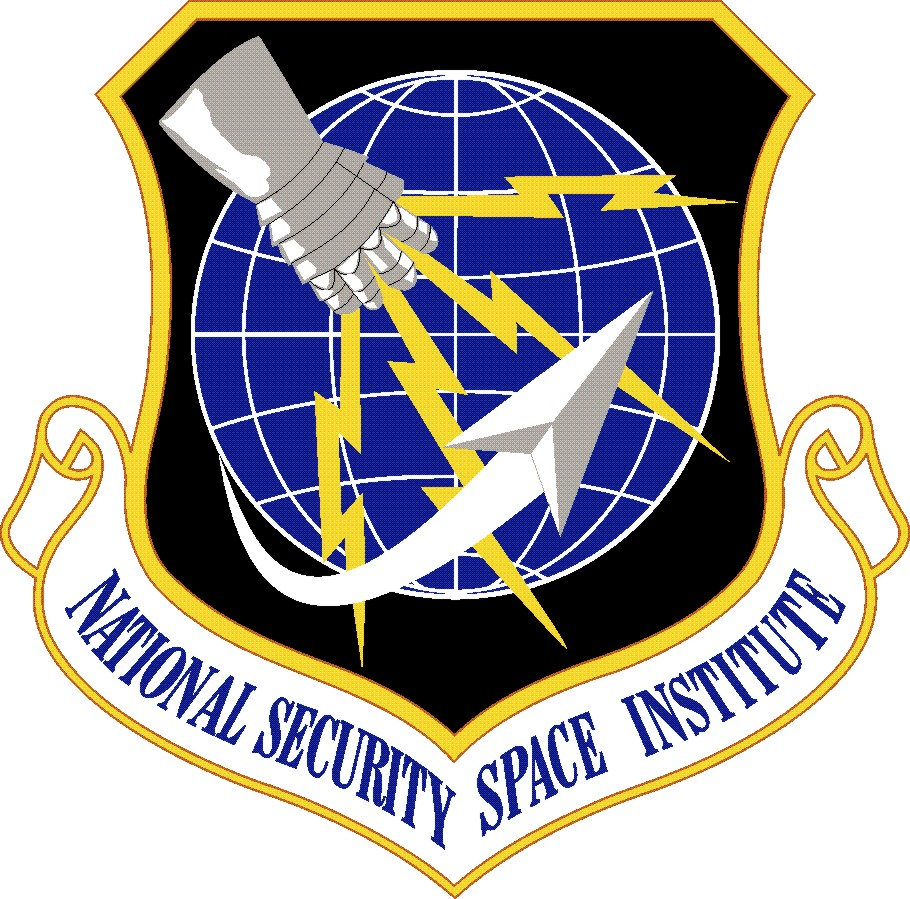
- NSSI emblem (until 2020)

The National Security Space Institute (NSSI) is a unit in the United States Space Force's Space Training and Readiness Command (STARCOM). Headquartered at Peterson Space Force Base, Colorado, it provides space professional military education to the military space professionals in the United States and its allies.

NSSI's history can be traced back as far as 2001 when the Air Force Space Operations School was activated on 28 July 2001 under the Space Warfare Center (later redesignated as Space Innovation and Development Center) at Schriever Air Force Base, Colorado. On 2004, it was redesignated as the National Security Space Institute and realigned under the Air Force Space Command and was subsequently transferred to its current location at Peterson Air Force Base. In 2009, it was realigned under Air Education and Training Command and remained there under various units in its Air University until 2020 when it was transferred to the Space Force to form part of the initial structure of STAR Delta (P). In August 2021, STAR Delta (P) was stood up as the USSF's third field command and given the name Space Training and Readiness Command (STARCOM).

In 2019, it established three new courses: Space 100, Space 200, and Space 300. It also started accepting participation of foreign nationals from coalition partners of the United States, an initiative of former Secretary of the Air Force Heather A. Wilson. Since 2019, the NSSI has grown from offering three courses to sixteen organized under two colleges: the College of Space Warfare and the College of Professional Development. The institute now serves more than 50 allied and friendly partners from across the globe.

== Organization ==
=== College of Professional Development ===
- Introduction to Space
- Space 100
- Space 200
- Space 300
- Space Executive Course
- Space Capstone Publication Course
- Mission Type Orders Course

=== College of Space Warfare ===
- Joint Space Planners Course
- Joint Integrated Space Team Course
- Coalition Space
- Space Intelligence Fundamentals
- Space Familiarization
- Fundamentals of Orbital Operations
- Concepts of Orbital Warfare
- Fundamental Application of Space Targeting
- Joint Space Targeting

=== College of Leadership Development ===
- Guardian Orientation Course
- Squadron Leadership Course
- Aegis
- Direct Ascent Course

== History ==
=== Lineage ===
- Constituted as United States Air Force Space Operations School on 15 June 2001

Activated on 28 July 2001
Redesignated as National Security Space Institute on 1 October 2004

=== Assignments ===
- Space Warfare Center, 28 June 2001
- 595th Space Group, 23 October 2002
- Air Force Space Command, 1 October 2004
- Air Education and Training Command, 1 October 2009
- Ira C. Eaker Center for Professional Development, 23 October 2009
- Air Force Institute of Technology, 1 April 2016
- Space Training and Readiness Delta (Provisional), 24 July 2020
- Space Training and Readiness Command, 23 August 2021

== List of Commandants ==
- Lt Col Frank Gallagher, 9 July 2004
- Col David L. Jones, 22 June 2006
- Col Robert Gibson, 31 August 2008
- Col Samuel H. Epperson Jr., 6 January 2011
- Col James Forand, 24 June 2014
- Col Richard B. Van Hook, 26 May 2015
- Col Max E. Lantz, 11 January 2019
- Col Kenneth F. L. Klock, 21 July 2022
- James E. Moschgat, 18 June 2024
- Col Albert Harris, May 2025

== See also ==
- Space Training and Readiness Command
- Space Delta 13
