= Space Delta 1 =

U.S. Space Force training unit

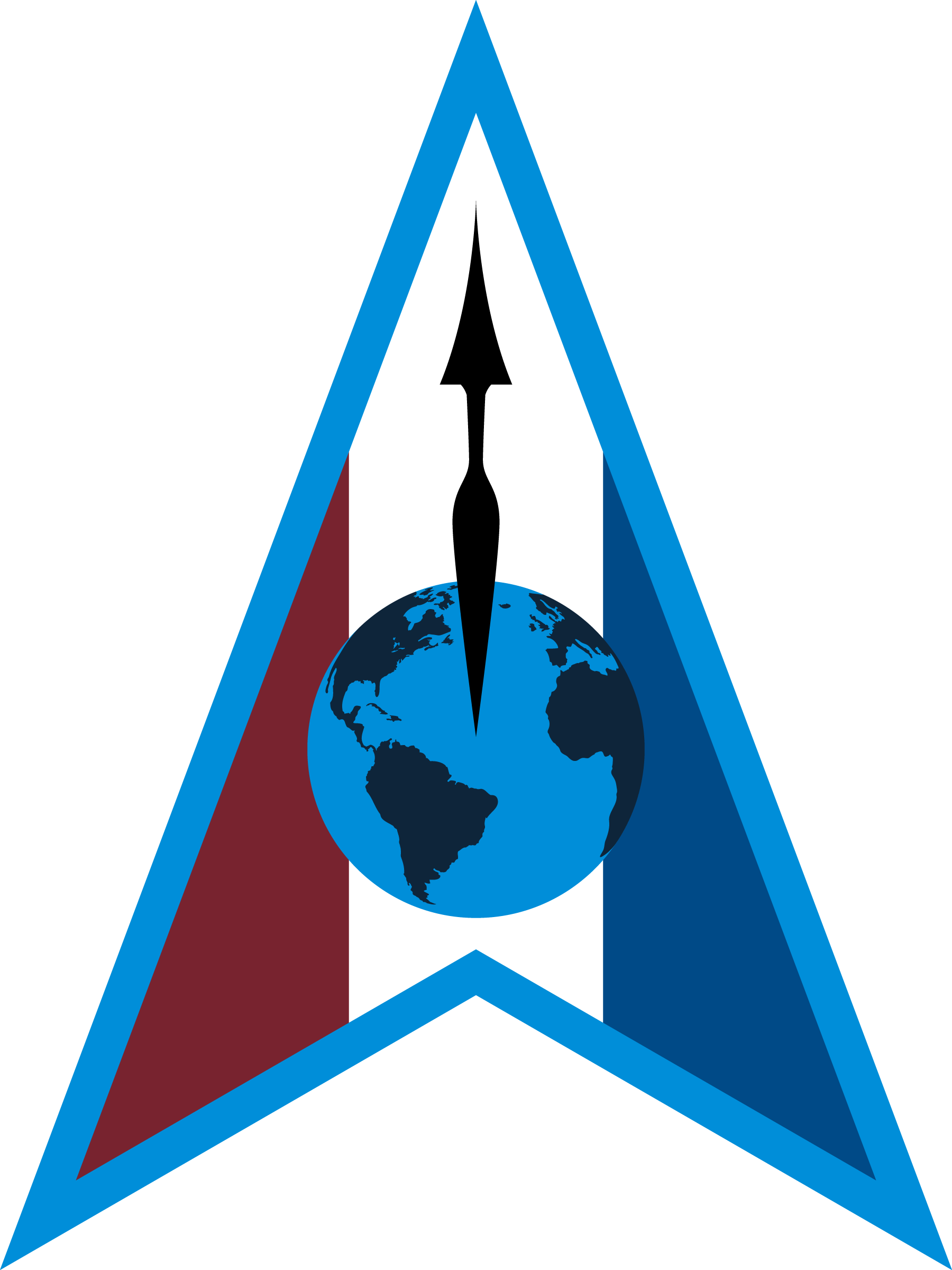
- DEL 1 emblem
- Active: 23 August 2021 (4 years, 354 days) as Space Delta 1 Detailed: 1942–1945, 1962–1986, 1994–2021, 2021–present
- Country: United States
- Branch: United States Space Force
- Type: Delta
- Role: Space training
- Part of: Space Training and Readiness Command
- Headquarters: Vandenberg Space Force Base, California
- Mottos: Triumphant We Fly (1942–1945) Peace, Power and Protection (1962–1986)
- Engagements: European Theater of Operations
- Decorations: Distinguished Unit Citation; Air Force Outstanding Unit Award
- Website: Space Delta 1 - Training

Commanders
- Commander: Col Krista N. St. Romain
- Deputy Commander: Lt Col Joseph G. Clemmer
- Senior Enlisted Leader: CMSgt Ryan M. Dawson
- Notable commanders: Joseph J. Nazzaro; Michael Lutton; Michele C. Edmondson

Insignia
- Guidon

Space Delta 1 (DEL 1) is a United States Space Force unit responsible for space training. It runs the Space Force's basic military training, weapons school, and other advanced training courses and exercises. It was established on 23 August 2021 following the establishment of the Space Training and Readiness Command, the field command to which it reports. It is headquartered at Vandenberg Space Force Base, California.

The Delta traces its history to the United States Air Force 381st Training Group, which provided training for the United States Air Force's intercontinental ballistic missile forces and missile maintenance forces. This Air Education and Training Command (AETC) organization had been a tenant unit located on an 80-acre (32 ha) site at Vandenberg. The group was activated in the fall of 1994, when it replaced a provisional group as missile training activities at Vandenberg were transferred to AETC.

During World War II, the group's first predecessor, the 381st Bombardment Group was an Eighth Air Force Boeing B-17 Flying Fortress unit, which flew strategic bombing missions from RAF Ridgewell. The group had the highest losses of all groups on first Schweinfurt–Regensburg mission on 17 August 1943. It flew 296 combat missions, earning two Distinguished Unit Citations. It flew its last mission on 25 April 1945 before returning to the United States, where it was inactivated. The group was activated in the reserve in 1947, but was not fully manned or equipped before inactivating in 1949.

The group's second predecessor is the 381st Strategic Missile Wing. During the Cold War, the wing maintained and operated LGM-25C Titan II missiles for the Strategic Air Command at sites near McConnell Air Force Base, Kansas. The wing and group were consolidated into a single unit in 1984. The consolidated unit was inactivated in 1986 as the Titan II was withdrawn from operational service.

== Structure ==
DEL 1 is one of five deltas that reports to the Space Training and Readiness Command. It is composed of the following two subordinate squadrons:

| Emblem | Name | Function | Headquarters |
|---|---|---|---|
| | 319th Combat Training Squadron | Advanced space operations training | Peterson Space Force Base, Colorado |
| | 533rd Training Squadron | Undergraduate space training | Vandenberg Space Force Base, California |

== History ==
=== World War II ===
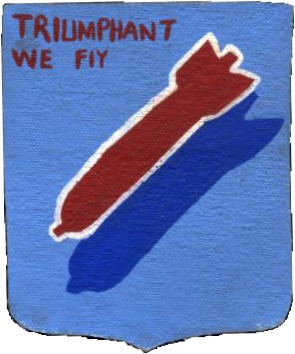
381st Bombardment Group emblem

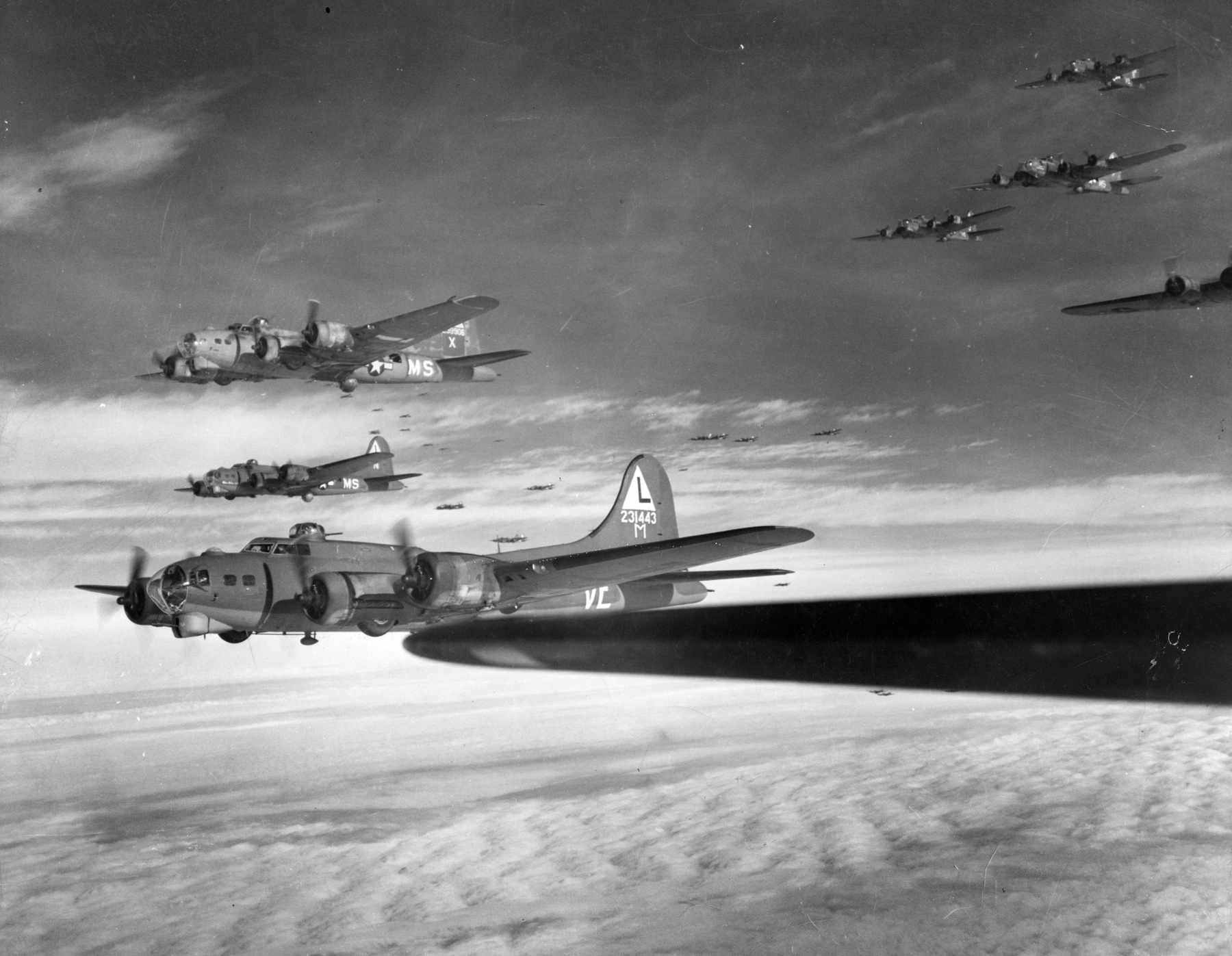
B-17s of the 381st Bomb Group en route to targets over Nazi-occupied territory. (Note: The aircraft in the foreground is Boeing B-17G-70-BO Flying Fortress, serial 42-31443 "Friday the 13th" of the 532d Bomb Squadron. This aircraft was lost on 22 February 1944 on a mission to Oschersleben, Germany.)

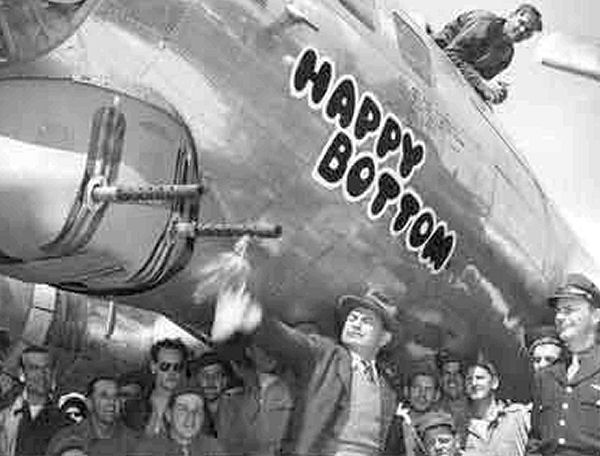
A group B-17G Flying Fortress being christened by Edward G. Robinson, 5 July 1944 (Note: Aircraft is Boeing B-17G-55-BO Flying Fortress, serial 42-102664, "Happy Bottom" of the 532d Bomb Squadron. This aircraft ditched in the English Channel on 16 July 1944.)

Constituted as the 381st Bombardment Group (Heavy) on 28 October 1942. Activated on 3 November 1942. Used B-17's in preparing for duty overseas. Moved to RAF Ridgewell England, May–June 1943, and assigned to Eighth Air Force. The 381st was assigned to the 1st Combat Bombardment Wing of the 1st Bombardment Division.

The 381st Bomb Group operated chiefly against strategic objectives on the Continent. Specific targets included an aircraft assembly plant at Villacoublay, an airdrome at Amiens, locks at St Nazaire, an aircraft engine factory at Le Mans, nitrate works in Norway, aircraft plants in Brussels, industrial areas of Münster, U-boat yards at Kiel, marshalling yards at Offenberg, aircraft factories at Kassel, aircraft assembly plants at Leipzig, oil refineries at Gelsenkirchen, and ball-bearing works at Schweinfurt.

The Group received a Distinguished Unit Citation for performance on 8 October 1943 when shipyards at Bremen were bombed accurately in spite of persistent enemy fighter attacks and heavy flak, and received a second DUC for similar action on 11 January 1944 during a mission against aircraft factories in central Germany.

Aircraft from the 381st participated in the intensive campaign of heavy bombers against enemy aircraft factories during Big Week, 20–25 February 1944, and the Group often supported ground troops and attacked targets of interdiction when not engaged in strategic bombardment.

The Group supported the Normandy invasion in June 1944 by bombing bridges and airfields near the beachhead. Attacked enemy positions in advance of ground forces at Saint-Lô in July 1944. It then assisted the airborne assault on Holland in September, before striking airfields and communications sites near the battle zone during the Battle of the Bulge, throughout December 1944 to January 1945. In the final stages of the war, the unit supported the Allied crossing of the Rhine in March 1945 and then attacked communications and transportation hubs in the final push through Germany.

After V-E Day, the 381st Bomb Group returned to Sioux Falls Army Air Field, South Dakota in July 1945 and was inactivated on 28 August.

=== Air Force Reserve ===
On 24 July 1947, the group was reactivated at Offutt Air Force Base, Nebraska as a reserve unit. It was nominally a heavy bomber group, but does not appear to have been equipped with operational aircraft or fully manned before inactivating in July 1949.

=== Strategic Air Command missile operations ===
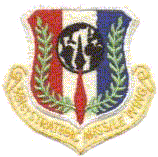
Patch with 381st Strategic Missile Wing emblem (approved 19 September 1962)

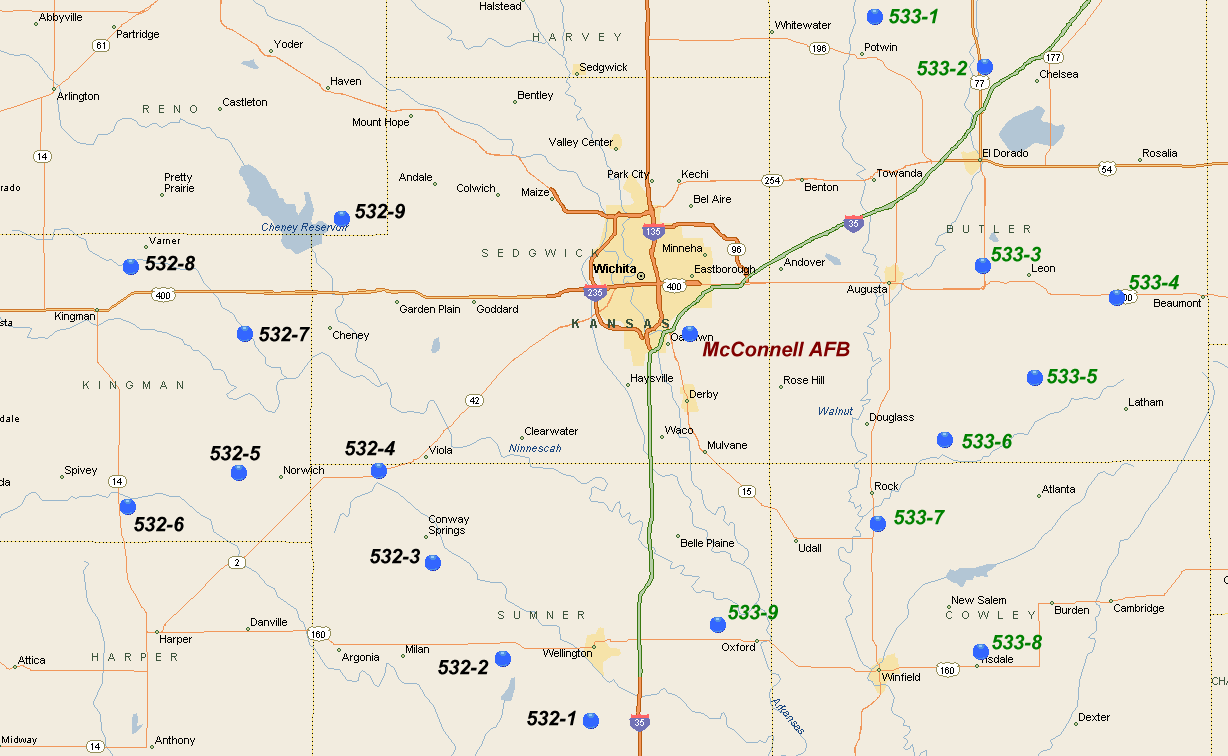
381st SMW Titan II Missile Sites

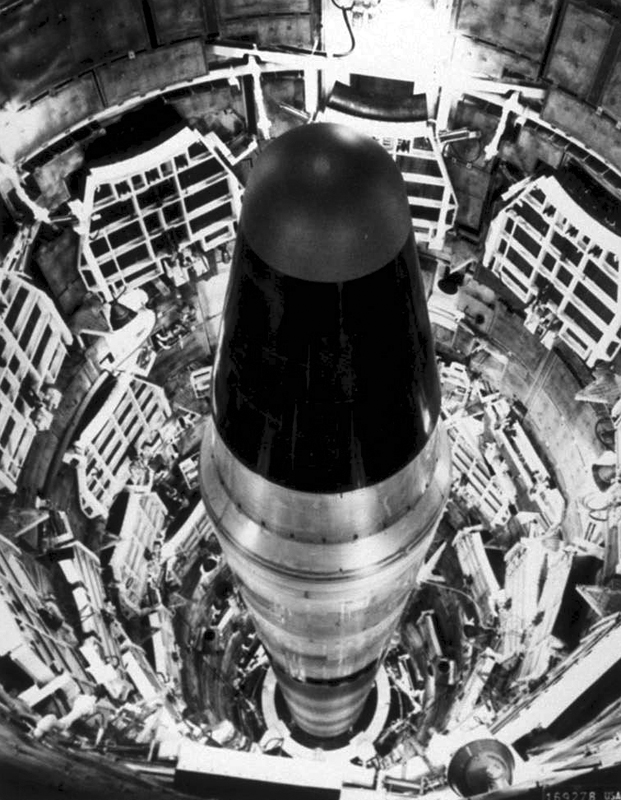
An LGM-25C Titan II intercontinental ballistic missile in silo, ready to launch

During the Cold War, the United States Air Force, via the Strategic Air Command (SAC), established the 381st Strategic Missile Wing, based at McConnell Air Force Base Kansas. The 381st maintained Titan II intercontinental ballistic missiles on alert from 1 March 1962 until being inactivated on 8 August 1986. The 381st placed its first Titan II missile on alert in the fall of 1963. It became the host wing for McConnell AFB on 1 July 1973.

The wing was composed of two Strategic Missile Squadrons (the 532nd and the 533rd). These squadrons were each composed of nine ballistic launch complexes, each housing a Titan II intercontinental ballistic missile. The Titan II being 105 feet long and 10 feet in diameter. The launch complex was about 150 feet deep and 50 feet in diameter including the 20-foot-diameter (6.1 m) launch tube which comprised its center.

The Titans were fully configured for immediate launch in a matter of two minutes. The launch sequence included a number of test and initiation functions as well as a 20-second door opening sequence. The silo closure door weighed 780 tons and was locked down with hydraulically operated locks, and raised on hydraulic jacks. The hydraulics also operated the radial motors that pulled the door open with 1.5-inch-diameter (38 mm) steel cables (four of them). Launch initiation was also accompanied with attenuation water which flowed 9000 gallons per minute for sound suppression and protection of the missile during the launch.

Launch crews were composed of four personnel. Two officers were responsible for launch initiation, while two enlisted crewmembers were responsible for equipment checkout, repair and readiness. All four crewmembers were together responsible for communications, and final responsibility for launch. With an average of eight alerts (duty shifts at the site) per month, a crewmember achieved 200 alerts in about two years.

On 24 August 1978, an accident involving an oxidizer leak at launch complex 533-7 killed two Air Force personnel, caused the temporary evacuation of local communities, and damaged the site.

In September 1978, First Lieutenant Patricia E. Dougherty became the first female officer to perform SAC Titan II alert.

On 2 October 1981, Deputy Secretary of Defense Frank Carlucci III ordered the inactivation of the Titan II weapon system. For McConnell, the end began on 2 July 1984, when Launch Complex 533-8 was removed from alert status. This silo would be placed in caretaker status on 31 August. The deactivation process received a setback on 2 November 1984, when fire broke out at Launch Complex 532-7 after liquid fuel had been unloaded from a deactivated Titan II. As a result of the ensuing investigation, Headquarters Strategic Air Command and the Ogden Air Logistics Center determined that the accident could have been prevented if different procedures were followed. With implementation of these procedures, Titan II deactivation continued.

On 8 August 1986, the 381st Strategic Missile Wing became the second Titan II wing to be inactivated. The 381st was inactivated after providing twenty-plus years of strategic deterrence and winning numerous awards, including the SAC missile combat competition Blanchard Trophy in 1972, 1975, 1980, and 1983.

=== Air Force space and missile training ===
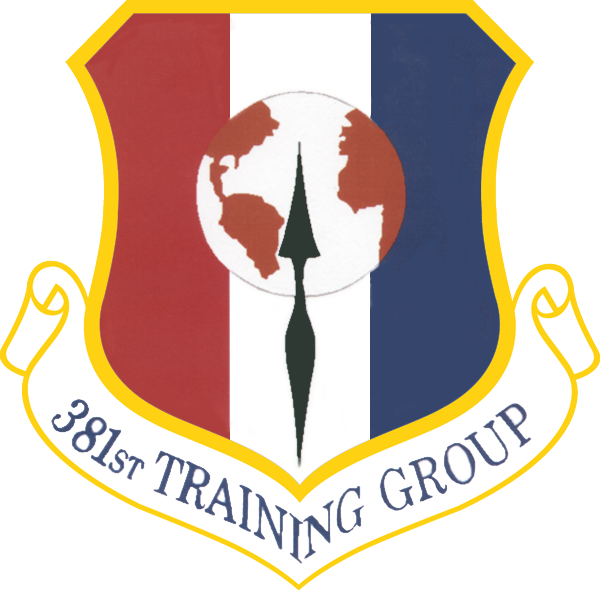
381st Training Group emblem

On 1 April 1994, the 381st was reactivated and redesignated by Air Education and Training Command (AETC) as the 381st Training Group (Provisional) (381 TRG) under Second Air Force and located at Vandenberg Air Force Base, California. A non-flying unit, the group, which was activated on 30 September 1994, is responsible for the consolidation of all space and missile training for Air Force Space Command (AFSPC) and Air Force Global Strike Command.

The 381st provides initial qualification training for ICBM forces. It also provides initial and advanced maintenance training on ALM and ICBMs. It conducts training in joint space fundamentals and associated computer maintenance.

In July 1993, responsibility for missile training was transferred from Air Combat Command to AETC. In September 1994, responsibility for space training was transferred from AFSPC to AETC and consolidated with the missile training units into the 381st Training Group. In October 1996, the space training squadrons moved from Colorado Springs to Vandenberg to further complete the unit's consolidation.

The group consists of two squadrons. The 381st Training Support Squadron provides faculty training, interactive courseware, registrar services, facility management, and resource management and procurement. The two other squadrons are dedicated to student training. The 532 TRS provides courses for ICBM Initial Qualification Training and ICBM, ALCM, and spacelift maintenance. All in all, the group has graduated more than 6000 students from more than 100 different courses.

In 2020, the 533d Training Squadron became a part of the Space Force’s STAR Delta, resulting in the Group losing its space training mission.

=== Space Delta 1 ===
The 381st Training Group was redesignated as Space Delta 1 and activated on 23 August 2021 following the establishment of the Space Training and Readiness Command. A ceremony was held on 3 September 2021 to recognize the delta's activation and the activation of the 1st Delta Operations Squadron.

== List of commanders ==
=== 381st Training Group ===
- Col Reni Renner, ??? – 7 July 2010
- Col Michael Lutton, 7 July 2010 – 13 June 2012
- Col Michele C. Edmondson, 13 June 2012 – May 2014
- Col Max E. Lantz II, May 2014 – July 2016
- Col Jennifer K. Reeves, July 2016 – 18 June 2018
- Col Merna Hsu, 18 June 2018 – 21 May 2020
- Col Daniel Rickards, 21 May 2020 – 31 May 2021

=== Space Delta 1 ===
| No. | Commander | | Term | | | Ref |
| No. | Portrait | Name | Took office | Left office | Term length | Ref |
|---|---|---|---|---|---|---|
| 1 | Jason Schramm | Colonel; Jason Schramm | 23 August 2021 | 17 July 2023 | 1 year, 328 days | |
| 2 | Peter C. Norsky | Colonel; Peter C. Norsky | 17 July 2023 | 25 June 2025 | 2 years, 8 days | |
| 3 | Krista N. St. Romain | Colonel; Krista N. St. Romain | 25 June 2025 | Incumbent | 1 year, 48 days | |

== Lineage ==
381st Bombardment Group

- Constituted as the 381st Bombardment Group (Heavy) on 28 October 1942

Activated on 3 November 1942

- Redesignated 381st Bombardment Group, Heavy on 20 August 1943

Inactivated 28 August 1945

- Redesignated 381st Bombardment Group, Very Heavy

Activated in the reserve on 24 July 1947
Inactivated on 27 June 1949

- Consolidated with the 381st Strategic Missile Wing as the 381st Strategic Missile Wing on 31 January 1984

Space Delta 1

- Established as the 381st Strategic Missile Wing (ICBM-Titan) on 29 November 1961 and activated (not organized)
- Organized on 1 March 1962
- Consolidated with the 381st Bombardment Group on 31 January 1984

Inactivated on 8 August 1986

- Redesignated as 381st Training Group and reactivated on 1 April 1994

Inactivated on 31 May 2021

- Redesignated as Space Delta 1 and activated on 23 August 2021

=== Assignments ===
- II Bomber Command, 3 November 1942
- Eighth Air Force, 9 May 1943
- 1st Bombardment Wing (later 1st Combat Bombardment Wing), 30 June 1943 (attached to 101st Combat Bombardment Wing (Provisional))
- 1st Combat Bombardment Wing, 13 September 1943
- Second Air Force, 24 June–28 August 1945
- Tenth Air Force, 24 July 1947
- 96th Bombardment Wing, 1 October 1947
- 73d Air Division, 4 June 1948 -27 June 1949
- Strategic Air Command, 29 November 1961 (not organized)
- 42d Air Division (later 42d Strategic Aerospace Division), 1 March 1962
- 17th Strategic Aerospace Division, 1 July 1963
- 12th Strategic Missile Division (later 12th Air Division, 30 June 1971
- 19th Air Division, 1 July 1973 – 8 August 1986
- Second Air Force, 1 April 1994 – 31 May 2021
- Space Training and Readiness Command, 23 August 2021 – present

=== Components ===
Group

- 381st Combat Support Group: 1 July 1972 – 8 August 1986

Squadrons

- 381st Communications Squadron: 15 June 1963 – 1 July 1972
- 381st Missile Maintenance Squadron, 15 June 1963 – 8 August 1986
- 381st Training Support Squadron: 30 September 1994 – present
- 392d Training Squadron, 30 September 1994 – c. 2 July 2012
- 532d Bombardment Squadron (Later 532d Strategic Missile Squadron, 532d Training Squadron), 3 November 1942 – 28 August 1945, 30 September 1947 – 27 June 1949, 1 March 1962 – 8 August 1986; 1 April 1994 – present
- 533d Bombardment Squadron (Later 533d Strategic Missile Squadron, 533d Training Squadron), 3 November 1942 – 28 August 1945; 1 March 1962 –maintgust 1986; 1 April 1994 – 1 September 2020
- 534th Bombardment Squadron: 3 November 1942 – 28 August 1945, 30 September 1947 – 3 May 1948
- 535th Bombardment Squadron: 3 November 1942 – 28 August 1945, 15 September 1947 – 27 June 1949

=== Stations ===
- Gowen Field, Idaho, 3 November 1942
- Ephrata Army Air Field, Washington, c. 1 December 1942
- Pyote Army Air Field, Texas, c. 3 January 1943
- Pueblo Army Air Base, Colorado, c. 5 April – c. 9 May 1943
- RAF Ridgewell (USAAF Station 167), England, June 1943 – June 1945
- Sioux Falls Army Air Field, South Dakota, – 28 July August 1945
- Offutt Air Force Base, Nebraska, 24 July 1947 – 27 June 1949
- McConnell Air Force Base, Kansas, 1 March 1962 – 8 August 1985/
- Vandenberg Air Force Base, California, 1 April 1994 – present

=== Aircraft and missiles ===
- Boeing B-17 Flying Fortress, 1942–1945
- LGM-25C Titan II, 1962–1986
