= Space Flag =

US Space Force military exercise

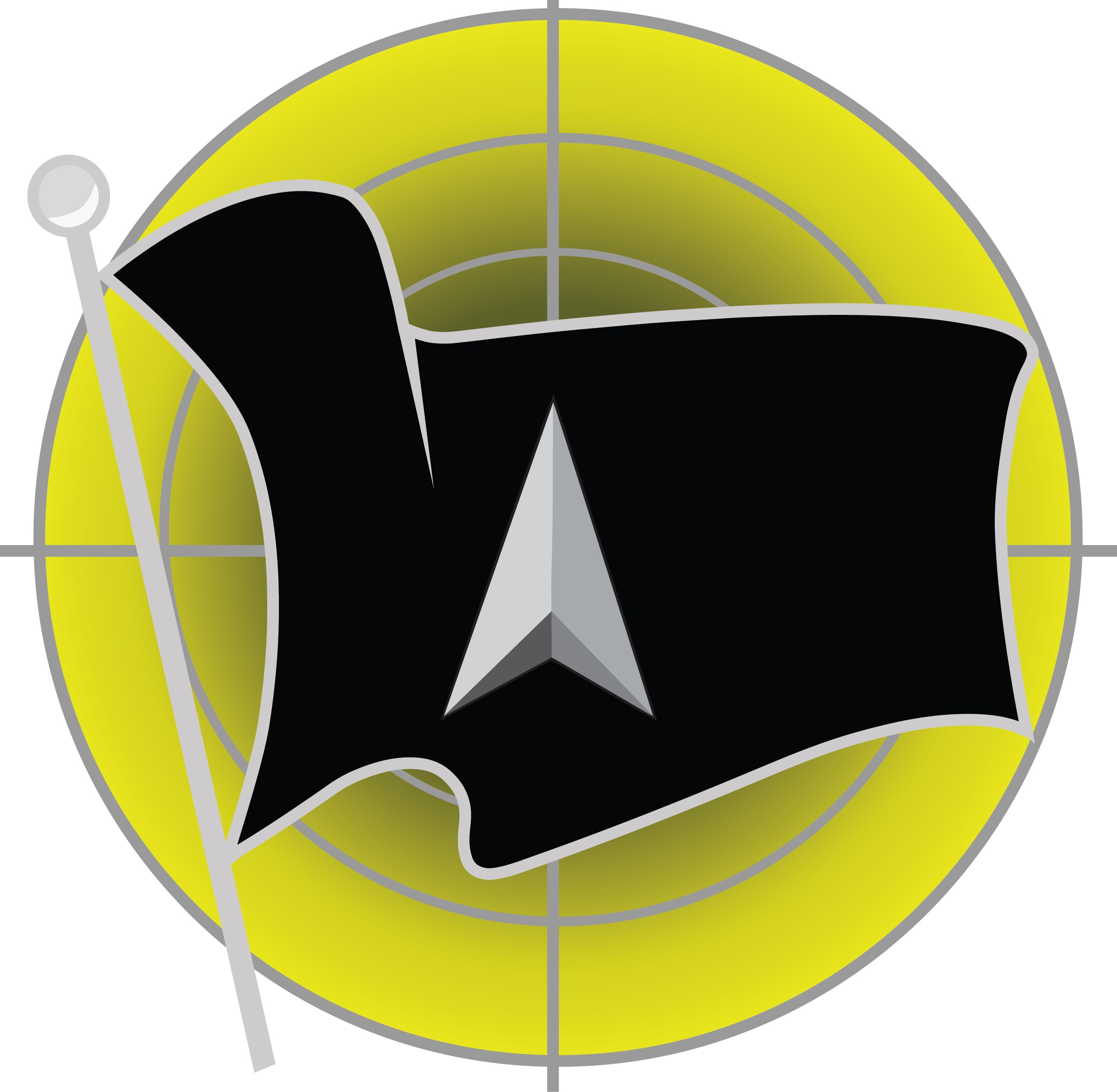
Space Flag Insignia

Exercise Space Flag is a United States Space Force (USSF) exercise intended to train tactical space units to gain and maintain space superiority. It aims to present realistic threats to analyze and respond to in a contested, degraded, and operationally-limited environment. Modeled after the US Air Force's Red Flag Exercise, it is the USSF's largest space-warfare exercise.

Since 24 July 2020, the exercise has been run by Space Training and Readiness Delta Provisional Operating Location-Alpha, previously known as Distributed Mission Operations Center-Space (DMOC-S) or the 705th Combat Training Squadron (CTS), OL-A, It is located at Schriever Air Force Base, Colorado.

The first Space Flag was held in April 2017. It was held twice in 2017 and 2018. Since 2019, Space Flag has been held three times per year, with one iteration that includes non-U.S. allies and security partners. Space Flag 19-3 in August 2019 included forces from Australia, Canada, and the United Kingdom.

The 527th Space Aggressor Squadron and 26th Space Aggressor Squadron operate the red cell and provide opposing forces, or OPFOR, for Space Flag.

== See also ==
- Exercise Red Flag – A similar training exercise hosted by the US Air Force
