= Space Training and Readiness Command =

U.S. Space Force education, training, doctrine and test field command

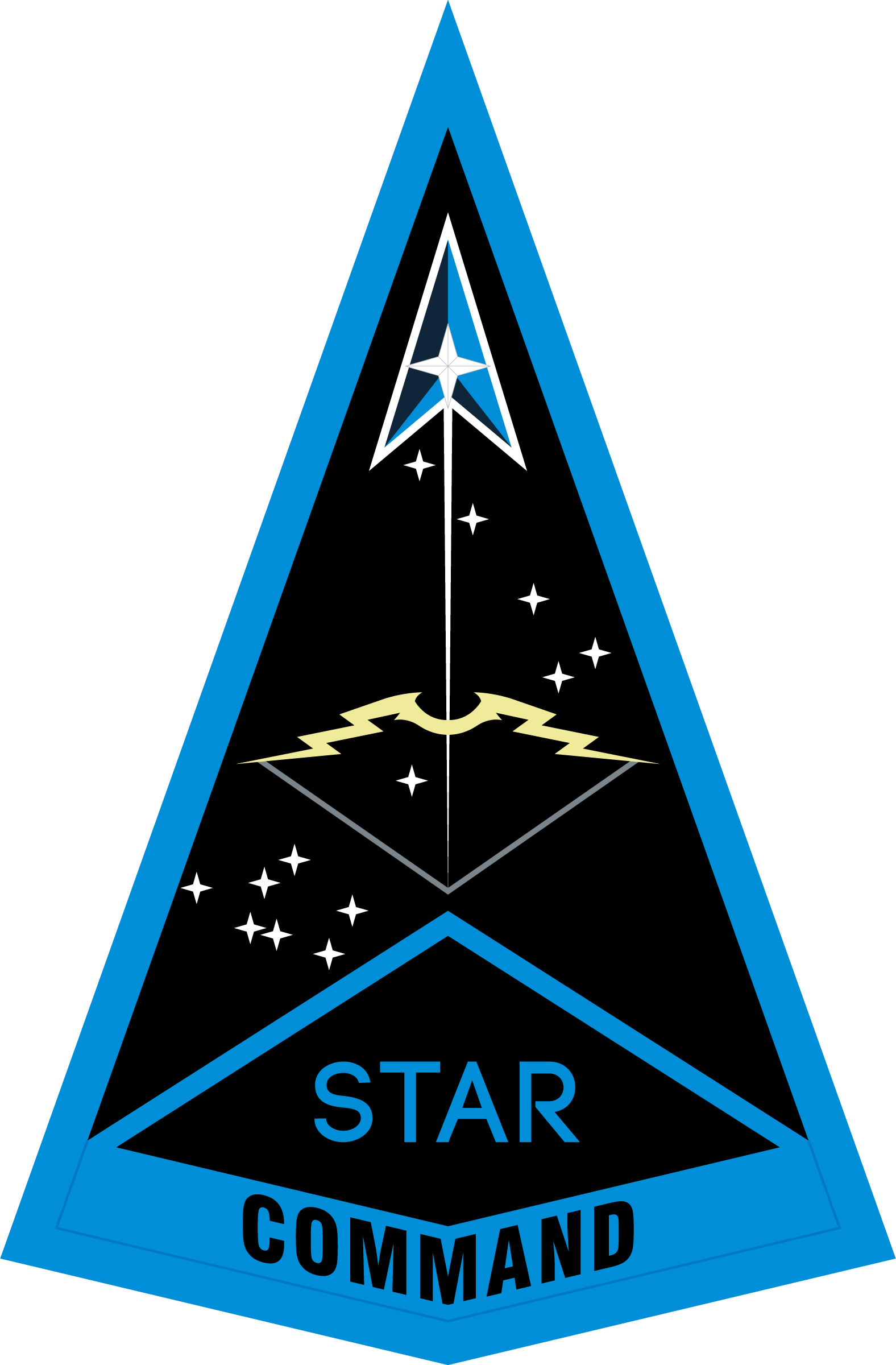
- Space Training and Readiness Command emblem
- Active: 1 November 1993 – Present (32 years, 10 months) Detailed: 23 August 2021 – Present (as Space Training and Readiness Command) 1 March 2006 – 1 April 2013 (as Space Innovation and Development Center) 1 July 1994 – 1 March 2006 (as Space Warfare Center) 1 November 1993 – 1 July 1994 (as USAF Space Warfare Center)
- Country: United States
- Branch: United States Space Force
- Type: Field command
- Role: "Forge the world’s most combat-credible space force"
- Size: 800 personnel
- Headquarters: Patrick Space Force Base, Florida, U.S.
- Colors: Cannes Blue
- Decorations: Air Force Organization Excellence Award
- Website: www.starcom.spaceforce.mil

Commanders
- Commander: Maj Gen James E. Smith
- Deputy Commander: Brig Gen Matthew S. Cantore
- Senior Enlisted Leader: CMSgt Jason D. Childers

Insignia
- Flag

Space Training and Readiness Command (STAR Command or STARCOM) is the United States Space Force's education, training, doctrine, and test field command. It is headquartered at Patrick Space Force Base, Florida.

Space Training and Readiness Command was first established on 1 November 1993 as the U.S. Air Force Space Warfare Center under Air Force Space Command and simply renamed to the Space Warfare Center (SWC) on 1 July 1994. On 1 March 2006, the Space Warfare Center was redesignated as the Space Innovation and Development Center (SIDC). The Space Innovation and Development Center was inactivated on 1 April 2013 and its responsibilities were transferred to Air Combat Command's United States Air Force Warfare Center. Following the establishment of the U.S. Space Force as an independent service, the Space Training and Readiness Delta (Provisional) was activated on 24 July 2020 under Space Operations Command to begin preparing the groundwork for STARCOM's activation as the Space Force's third field command on 23 August 2021.

== History ==
=== Beginning as the Space Warfare Center ===
Space Warfare Center groups and squadrons
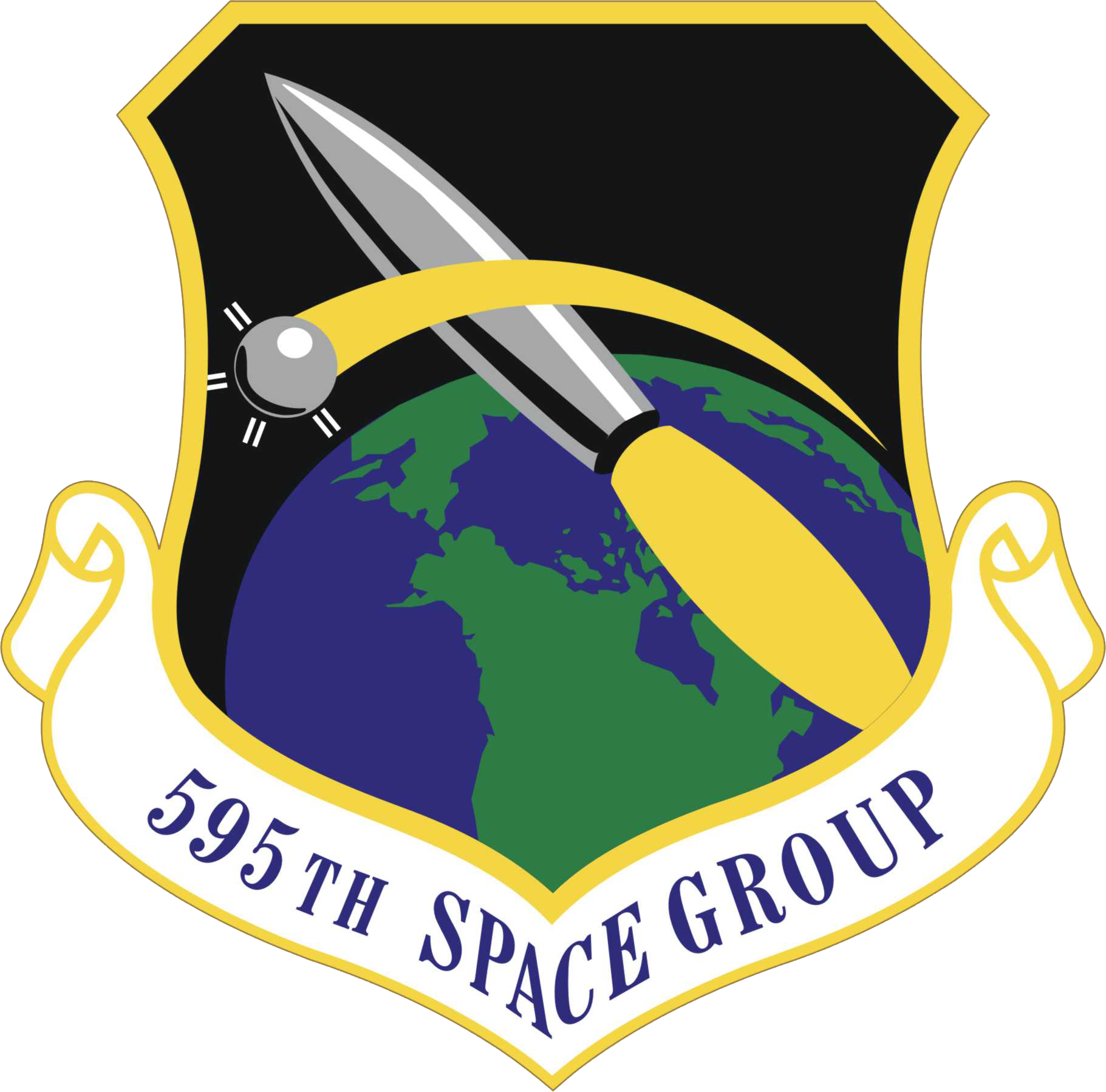
595th Space Group

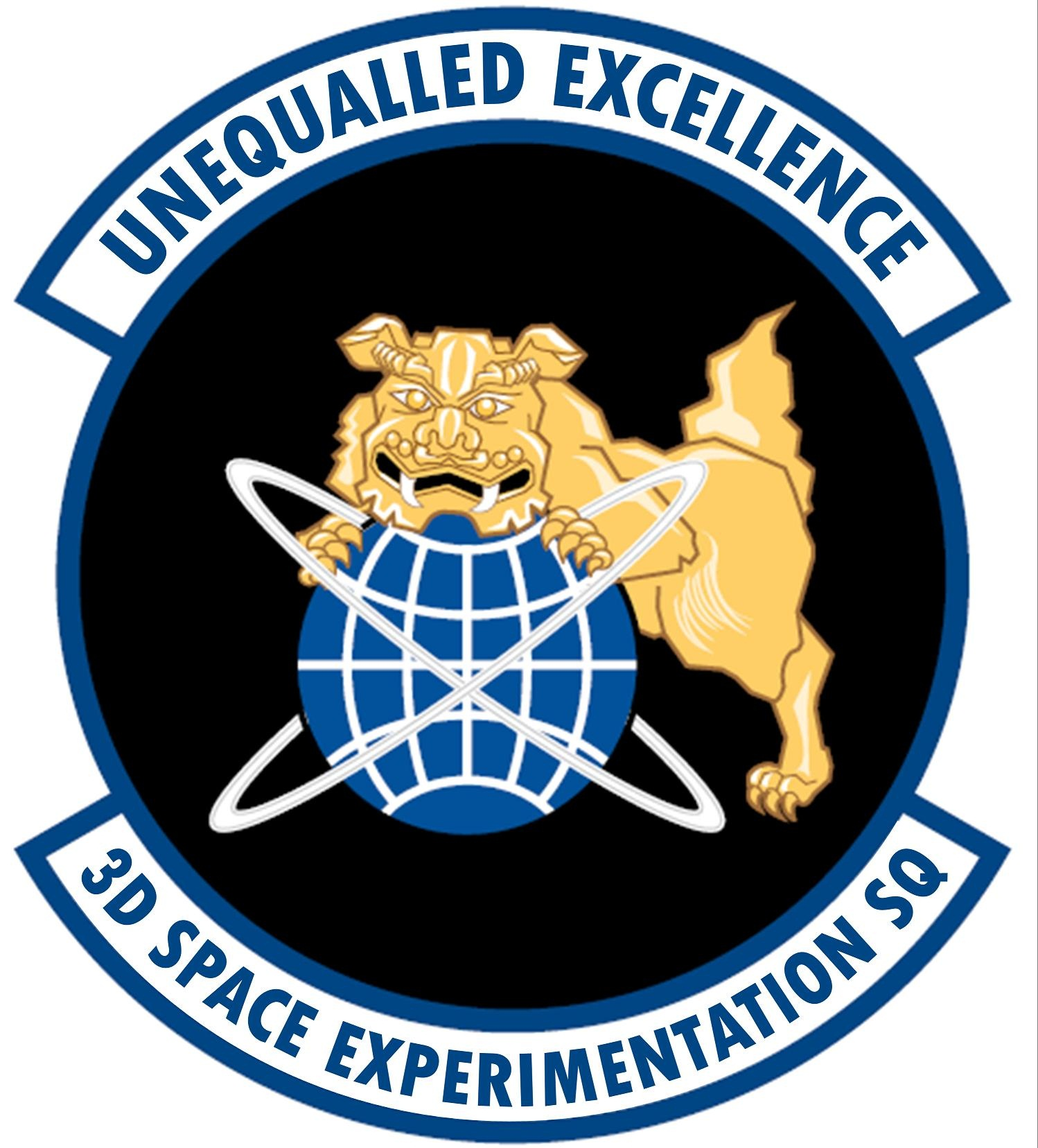
3rd Space Experimentation Squadron

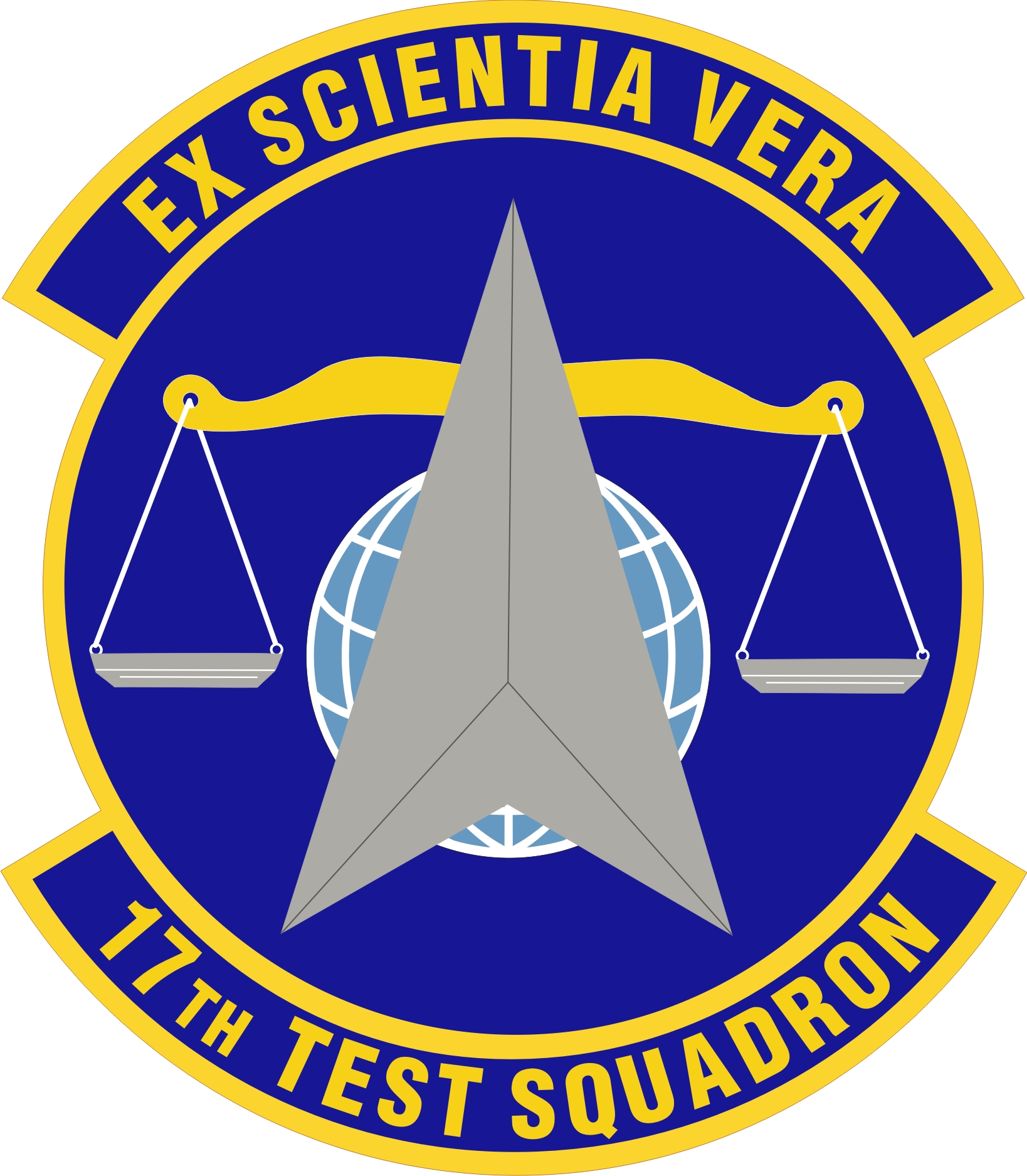
17th Test Squadron

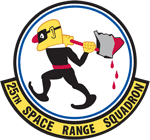
25th Space Range Squadron

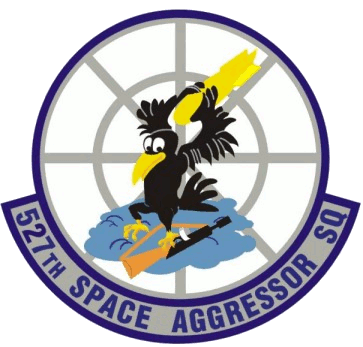
527th Space Aggressor Squadron

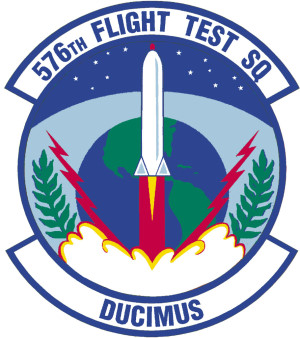
576th Flight Test Squadron

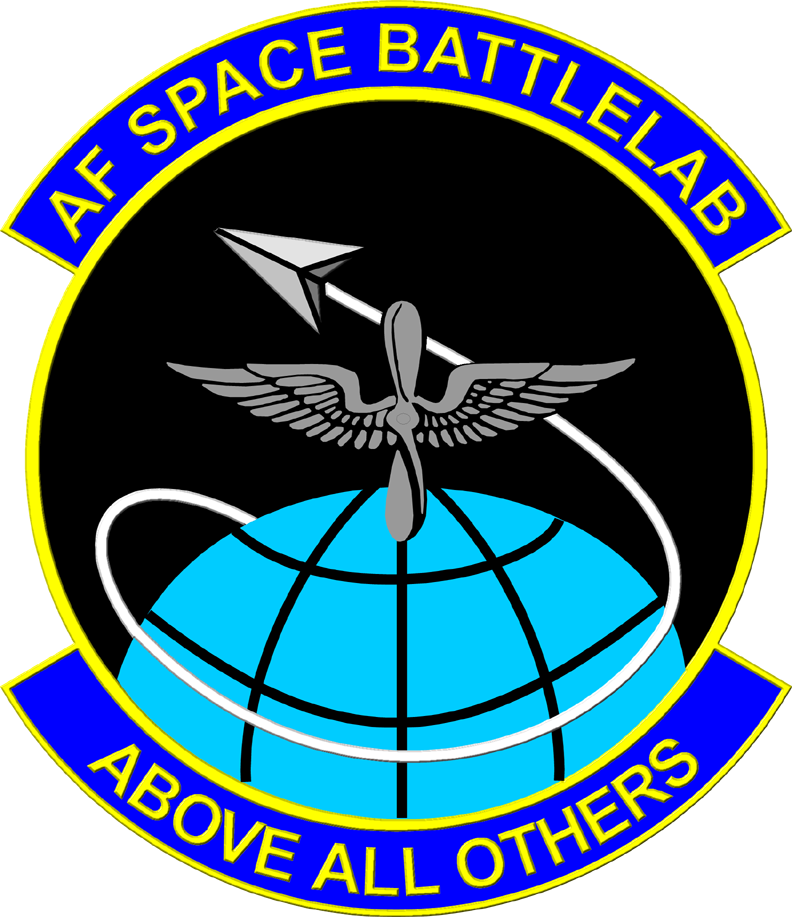
Air Force Space Battlelab

The U.S. Air Force Space Warfare Center (SWC) was established on 1 November 1993 at Falcon Air Force Base under Air Force Space Command to better enhance military space capabilities. On 1 July 1994, its name was simplified to the Space Warfare Center. The Space Warfare Center was created as a direct result of the Gulf War, where U.S. space capabilities were used more than any previous conflict, but post–war analysis indicated potential shortfalls.

The Space Warfare Center was specifically tasked with integrating space forces with terrestrial forces, including working with the Air Force Doctrine Center and Air University to incorporate space. It was compared with the United States Army Air Corps' Air Corps Tactical School in its role and purpose. It also was responsible for integrating air, space, and cyberspace capabilities in wargames and exercises, conducted advanced space training, and oversaw space experiments and the space ranges. On 21 July 1995, the 17th Test Squadron was activated to manage Air Force Space Command test programs and placed under the Space Warfare Center. This was followed by the realignment of the 576th Flight Test Squadron, which performed flight testing of the LGM-30G Minuteman III, from the 30th Operations Group to the Space Warfare Center on 22 February 1996. In 1997, the Air Force began standing up a series of battlelabs to foster innovation across its major commands and functions. The Air Force Space Battlelab was activated on 9 April 1997 and its initial focus was space surveillance. On 23 October 2000, the 527th Space Aggressor Squadron was activated as the first space aggressor unit.

On 7 April 2000, the Space Warfare Center gained the 595th Test and Evaluation Group, which was redesignated as the 595th Space Group on 1 August 2002. The 595th Space Group was originally activated in 1970 under the 6595th Aerospace Test Wing as the 6595th Missile Test Group, before being redesignated as the 6595th Test and Evaluation Group in 1988. Following its activation, the 17th Test Squadron and 576th Flight Test Squadron were realigned under the 595th Space Group. The 527th Space Aggressor Squadron was also realigned on 23 October 2002 and the 25th Space Control Tactics Squadron, renamed the 25th Space Range Squadron, was activated under it on 1 July 2004. Following the 2001 Space Commission report, Air Force Space Command established the United States Air Force Space Operations School on 28 June 2001. It was realigned under the 595th Space Group on 23 October 2002 and renamed to the National Security Space Institute on 1 October 2004, being realigned directly under Air Force Space Command.

On 1 March 2006, the Space Warfare Center was redesignated as the Space Innovation and Development Center (SIDC). As part of this change, the 25th Space Range Squadron and 527th Space Aggressor Squadron were scheduled to be transferred to Air Combat Command, however only the 527th Space Aggressors Squadron transferred to the 57th Adversary Tactics Group. Instead, the Space Innovation and Development Center activated the 3rd Space Experimentation Squadron on 10 March 2006, assigning it to the 595th Space Group. Starting in 2006, the Air Force began to move to close all of its battlelabs and on 2 November 2007, the Space Battlelab was inactivated. This was followed by the 576th Flight Test Group being reassigned to Air Force Global Strike Command on 1 December 2009, as part of the transfer of missile responsibilities from Space Command to Global Strike Command.

On 1 April 2013, the Space Innovation and Development Center, along with the 595th Space Group, were inactivated. The 3rd Space Experimentation Squadron was reassigned the 50th Space Wing. The remaining units were transferred to Air Combat Command, with the 17th Test Squadron becoming part of the 53rd Test Management Group and the 25th Space Range Squadron becoming part of the Nevada Test and Training Range.

=== Resurrection as Space Training and Readiness Command ===
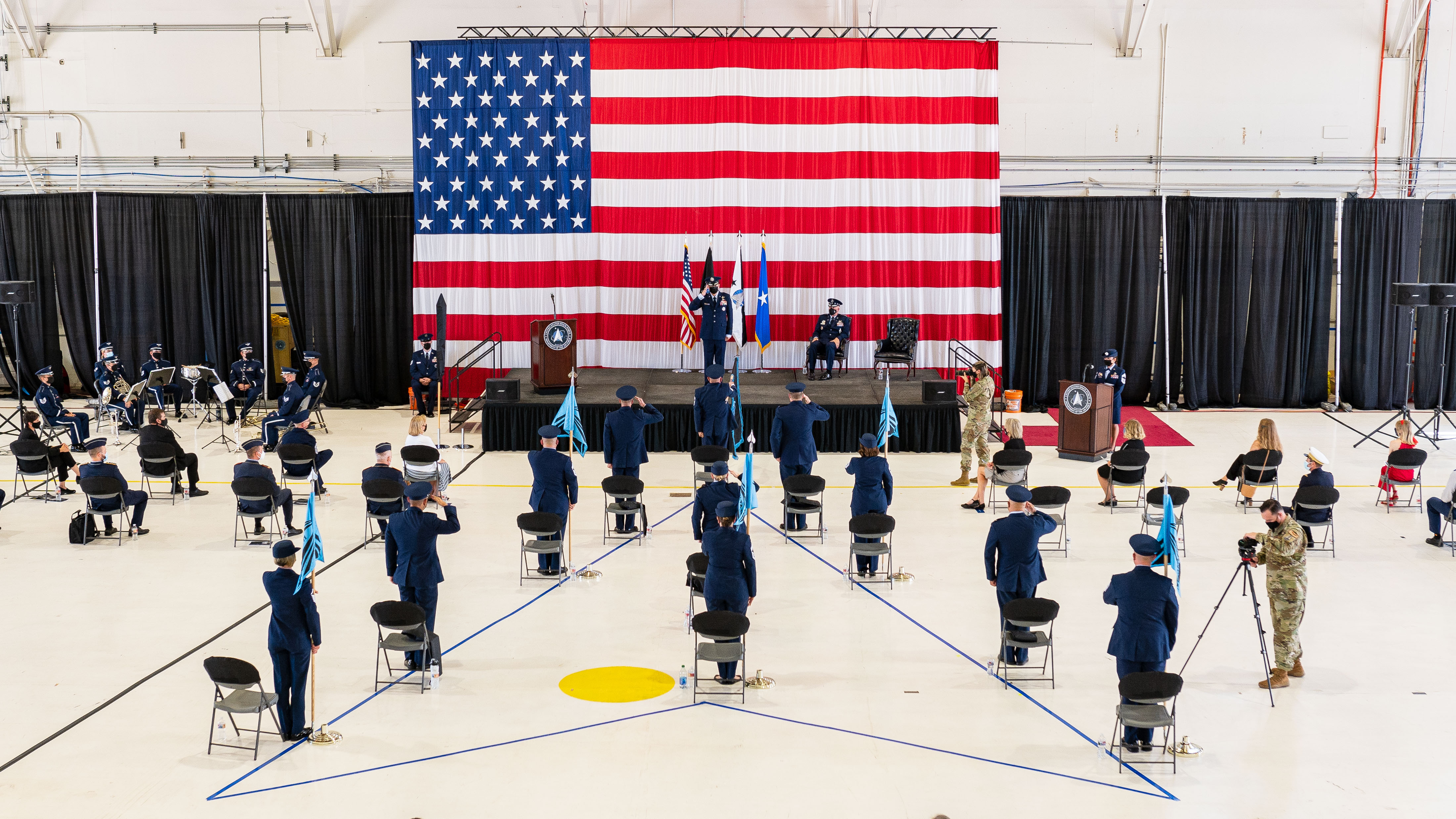
STARCOM activation ceremony on 23 August 2021

The first mention of STARCOM during planning for the Space Force was in a 18 March 2019 briefing given by Task Force Tango, a planning group within Air Force Space Command and its mission was finalized later that year. In December 2020, the Space Training and Readiness Command Task Force was created, with Brigadier General Shawn Bratton, an Air National Guard officer, serving as planning lead and Chief Master Sergeant James P. Seballes senior enlisted leader.

The creation of STARCOM was announced on 30 June 2020 as one of three field commands in the Space Force. It was scheduled to be activated in 2021. In the interim, the Space Training and Readiness Delta (Provisional) was activated on 24 July 2020 under Space Operations Command to consolidate the various space training and education units from the United States Air Force that was realigned to the Space Force. Reporting to Space Operations Command, STAR Delta (P) served as the precursor organization to STARCOM while its establishment was still being planned.

On 23 August 2021, STARCOM was activated as the Space Force's first field command following the inactivation of STAR Delta (P). Brigadier General Shawn Bratton took command as the first commander of STARCOM and Chief Master Sergeant Seballes became its first senior enlisted leader. Following the activation of STARCOM, five subordinate deltas were also activated that serves as the main structure of the new field command. Colonel Peter J. Flores, who served as STAR Delta (P) commander, took command of Space Delta 12. The field command's headquarters is temporarily located at Peterson Space Force Base while its permanent headquarters will be selected following a base selection process.

In May 2023, the Department of the Air Force announced that Space Training and Readiness Command's permanent home would be Patrick Space Force Base, Florida. It also announced that Space Delta 10 would also be moving from the U.S. Air Force Academy to Patrick SFB, Space Delta 11 would move from Schriever SFB to Kirtland Air Force Base, and that Space Delta 12 would stay at Schriever SFB.

== Symbolism ==
Emblems of Space Training and Readiness Command and its predecessors
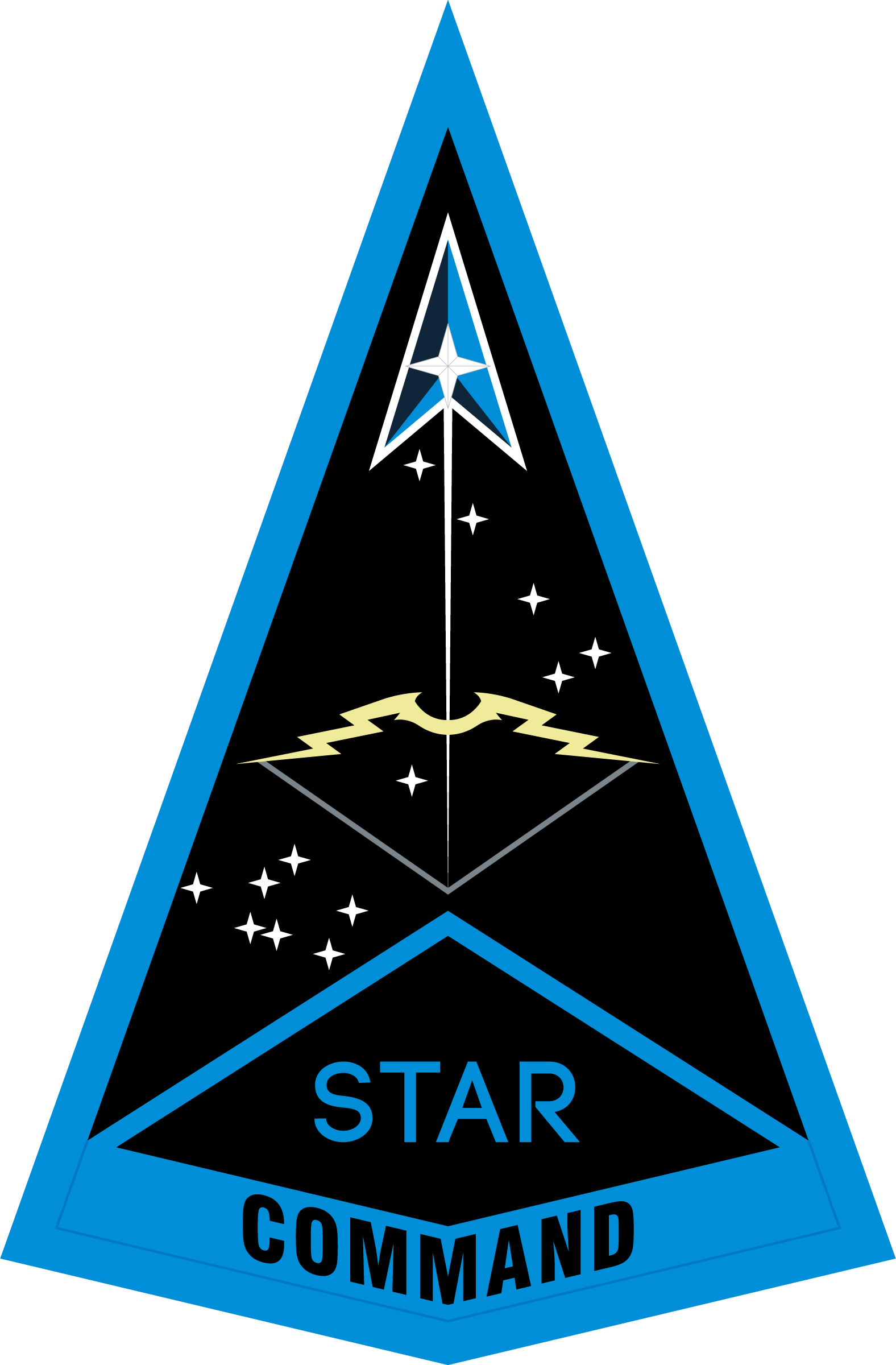
Space Training and Readiness Command (2021–present)

Space Training and Readiness Delta (Provisional) (2020–2021)

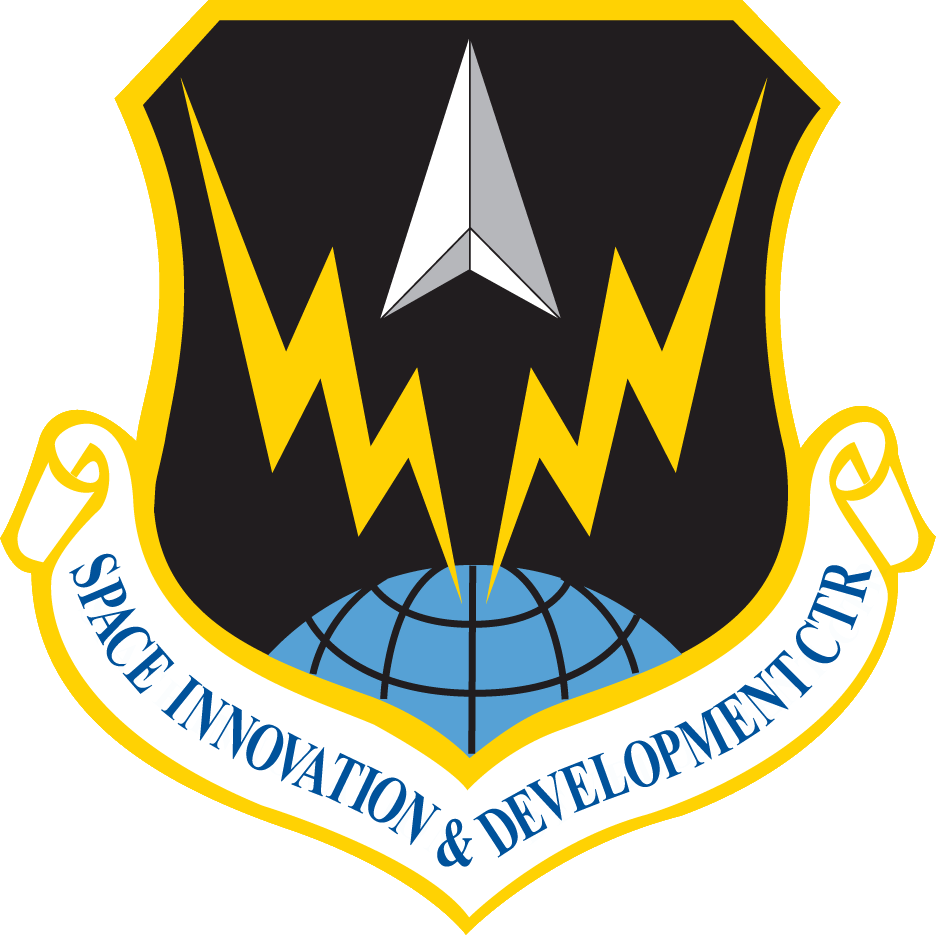
Space Innovation and Development Center and Space Warfare Center (1993–2013)

Polaris symbolizes the guiding light of security and defending the space domain. This is the same star from the USSF logo. The delta is taken from the USSF Seal; the Delta evokes historic ties to the earliest days of the U.S. Air Force space community, and symbolizes change and innovation. The dark and light shades of grey within the delta embody the 24/7 operations of the Space Force, while the placement and upward orientation of the delta reveals the central role of the Space Force in defending the space domain. The handle of the bow is made from lightning in homage to the Space Warfare Center and Space Innovation and Development Center's historic work to bring space to the fight in the sea, air and land domains, and linking the same to STARCOM's new role of developing and fielding forces to fight and win in the space domain. The constellations of Noctua and Sagitta represent Athena, the Greek Goddess of Wisdom and War. Noctua, Latin for owl, is a constellation which represents STARCOM's wisdom in training, and Saggita, Latin for arrow, represents STARCOM's constant readiness.

== Structure ==
STARCOM is composed of five deltas activated following the activation of the field command. Space Delta 1 is located at Vandenberg Space Force Base, California and Space Delta 10 is located at Patrick Space Force Base, Florida, while the other deltas have to undergo a permanent base selection process.

Delta	Function	Headquarters	Current Commander
Space Delta 1	Space training	Vandenberg Space Force Base, California	Col Jason N. Schramm
Space Delta 10	Space doctrine and wargaming	Patrick Space Force Base, Florida*	Col Leah Shubin
Space Delta 11	Space range and aggressor	Schriever Space Force Base, Colorado*	Col Jay M. Steingold
Space Delta 12	Space test and evaluation	Schriever Space Force Base, Colorado*	Col E. Lincoln Bonner III
Space Delta 13	Space education	Maxwell Air Force Base, Alabama*	Col Niki J. Lindhorst

Previous components included the 595th Space Group.

== List of commanders ==
No.	Commander		Term		
No.	Portrait	Name	Took office	Left office	Term length
1	Shawn Bratton	Major General; Shawn Bratton (born 1968)	23 August 2021	20 July 2023	1 year, 331 days
2	Timothy Sejba	Major General; Timothy Sejba (born 1972)	20 July 2023	18 July 2025	1 year, 363 days
3	James E. Smith	Major General; James E. Smith (born 1973)	18 July 2025	Incumbent	1 year, 67 days

== See also ==
- United States Air Force Academy
- Space Flag

U.S. Armed Forces training and education commands

- Army Training and Doctrine Command
- Marine Corps Training and Education Command
- Naval Education and Training Command
- Air Education and Training Command
