= 71st Intelligence, Surveillance, and Reconnaissance Squadron =

U.S. Space Force unit

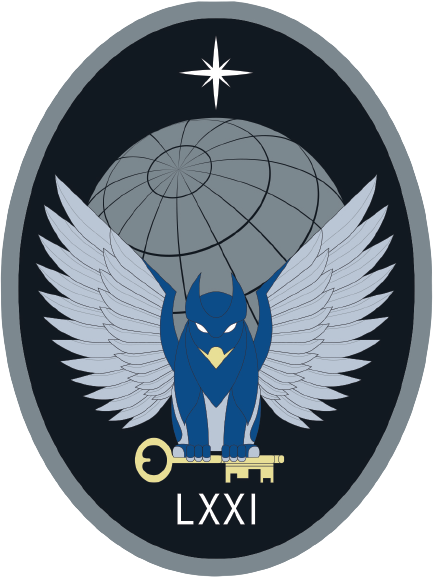
- Squadron emblem
- Active: 11 September 2020–24 June 2025
- Country: United States
- Branch: United States Space Force
- Type: Squadron
- Role: Intelligence, surveillance, and reconnaissance
- Part of: Space Delta 7
- Headquarters: Peterson Space Force Base

Commanders
- Commander: Lt Col Samuel Barbaro
- Director of Operations: Capt Deante "POISUN" Covington
- Superintendent: SMSgt Antoinette Davis

The 71st Intelligence, Surveillance, and Reconnaissance Squadron (71 ISRS) was a United States Space Force unit assigned to Space Operations Command's Space Delta 7. It provided intelligence support to all deltas in the Space Force through its six detachments. Headquartered at Peterson Space Force Base, Colorado, it was activated on 11 September 2020 and inactivated on 24 June 2025.

== List of commanders ==
- Lt Col Michael Harter, 11 September 2020 – 23 June 2022
- Lt Col Michelle Saffold, 24 June 2022 – 23 June 2024
- Lt Col Zachary Van Valkenburg, 24 June 2024 - 20 January 2025
- Lt Col Samuel Barbaro, 21 January 2025 - 24 June 2025

== See also ==
- Space Delta 7
