= 72nd Intelligence, Surveillance, and Reconnaissance Squadron =

U.S. Space Force unit

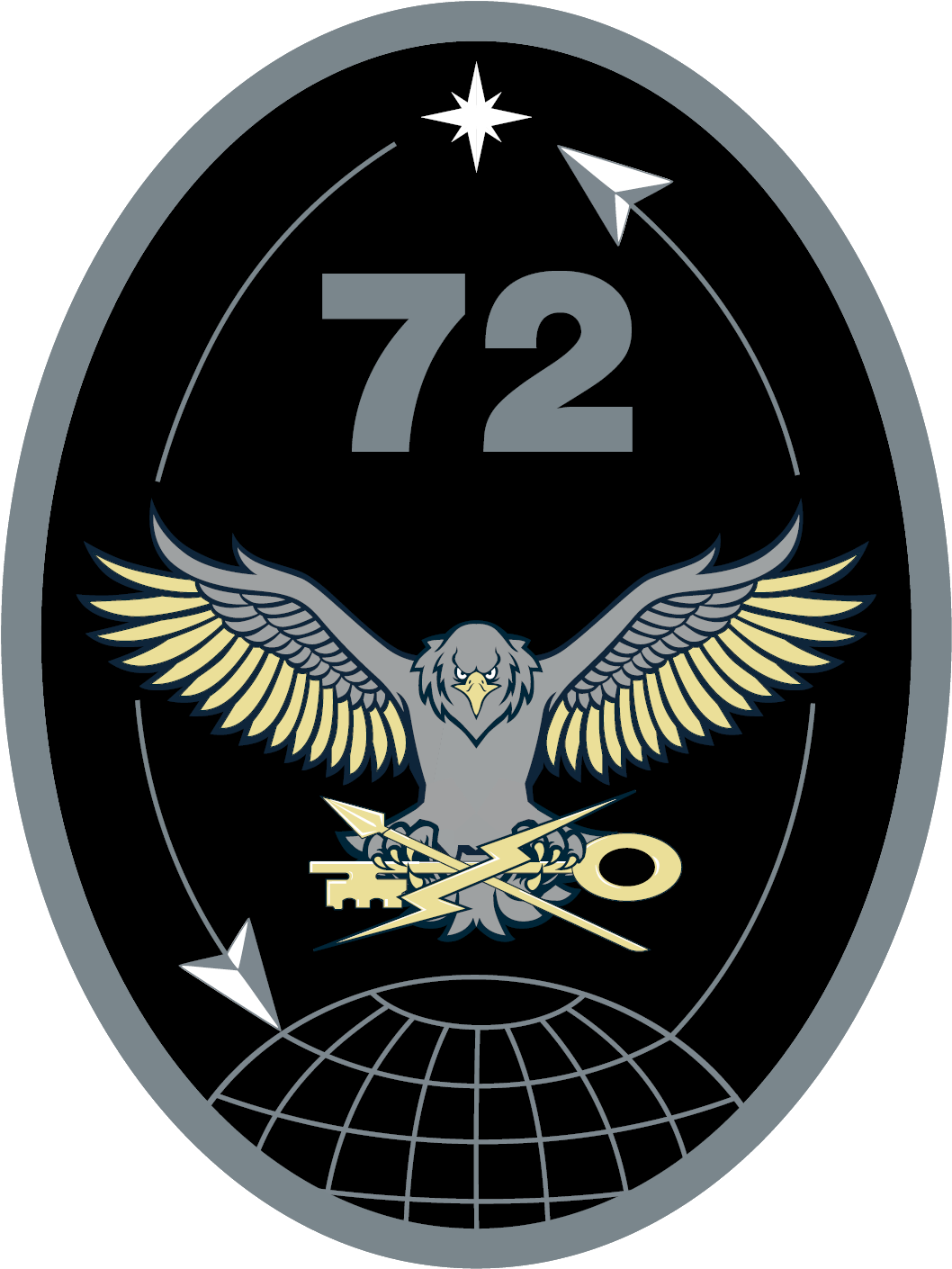
- Squadron emblem
- Active: 6 January 2020–present
- Country: United States
- Branch: United States Space Force
- Type: Squadron
- Role: Intelligence, surveillance, and reconnaissance
- Part of: Space Delta 7
- Headquarters: Peterson Space Force Base

Commanders
- Commander: Lt Col David Hoyt
- Superintendent: SMSgt Felix Morales

The 72nd Intelligence, Surveillance, and Reconnaissance Squadron (72 ISRS) is a United States Space Force unit assigned to Space Operations Command's Space Delta 7. It provides intelligence support to the United States Space Command and other unified combatant commands. Headquartered at Peterson Space Force Base, Colorado, it was originally activated as the 18th Intelligence Squadron, Detachment 1 on 6 January 2020 and as a squadron on 11 September 2020.

== List of commanders ==
- Lt Col Kimberly Templer (2020-2022)
- Lt Col Briana Frey (2022-2024)
- Lt Col David Hoyt (2024–Present)

== See also ==
- Space Delta 7
