= 75th Intelligence, Surveillance and Reconnaissance Squadron =

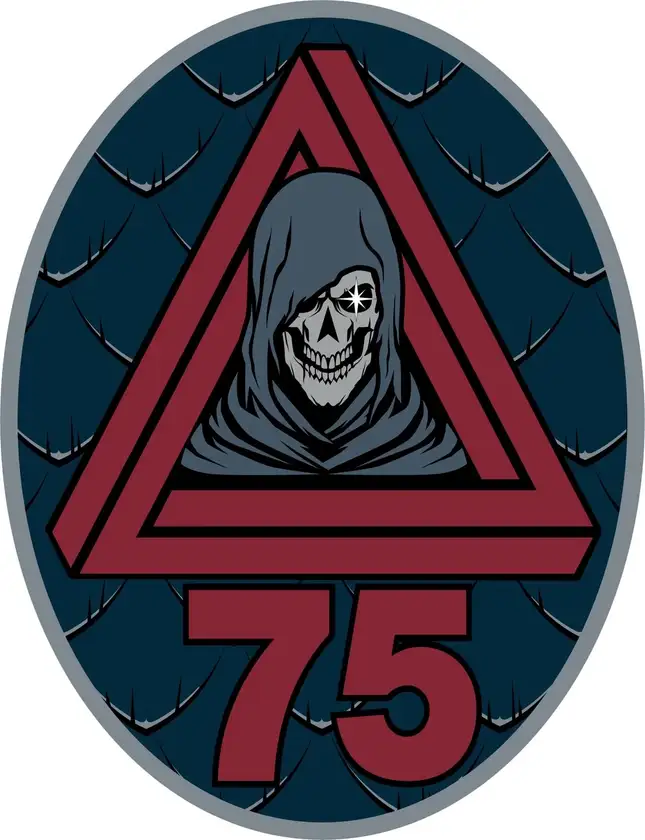
75th Intelligence, Surveillance and Reconnaissance Squadron

The 75th Intelligence, Surveillance and Reconnaissance Squadron is a United States Space Force intelligence unit. It was activated on August 11, 2023. It is the first squadron-level unit dedicated to the targeting of enemy satellites. It is a part of Space Delta 7.

== List of commanders ==
- Lt Col Travis Anderson, 2023-present
