= Space Delta 7 =

U.S. Space Force intelligence, surveillance, and reconnaissance unit

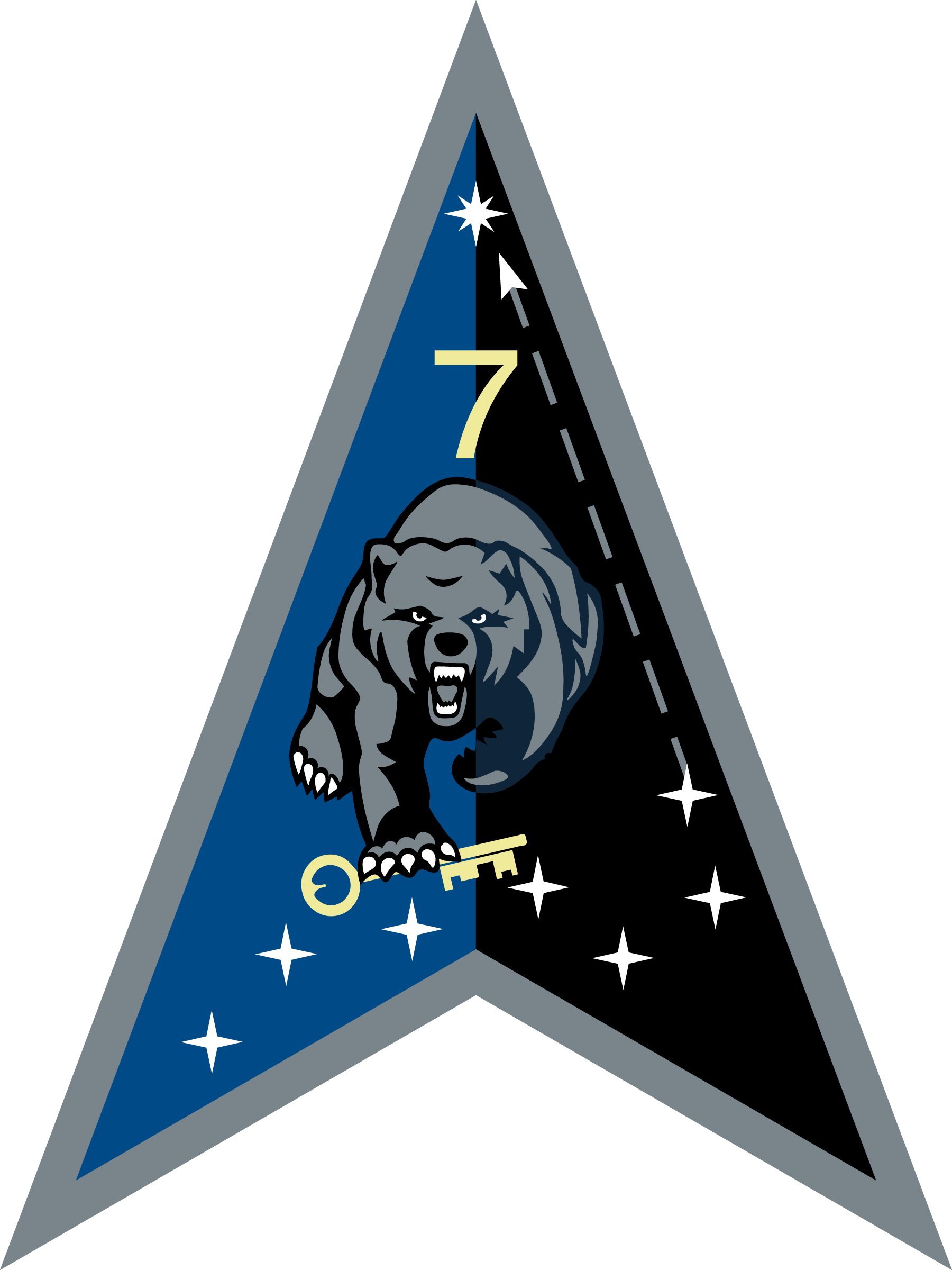
- Emblem of Space Delta 7
- Founded: 24 July 2020; 5 years ago
- Country: United States
- Branch: United States Space Force
- Type: Delta
- Role: Intelligence, surveillance, and reconnaissance
- Part of: United States Space Force Combat Forces Command
- Headquarters: Peterson Space Force Base, Colorado, U.S.
- Website: www.peterson.spaceforce.mil/Units/Space-Delta-7/

Commanders
- Commander: Col Nathaniel A. Peace
- Vice Commander: Lt Col Christopher 'Gene' Adams
- Superintendent: CMSgt Cassaundra Buthorne

Insignia
- Guidon

Space Delta 7 (DEL 7) is a United States Space Force unit responsible for Intelligence, Surveillance and Reconnaissance (ISR) for the United States Space Force. The delta provides actionable and time-sensitive intelligence for space domain operations including detection, characterization and targeting of adversary space capabilities. The unit employs a variety of fixed and mobile sensors across the globe operated by intelligence professionals to enable its mission to gain and maintain information dominance in the space domain in the execution of National Defense Strategy priorities. It is headquartered at Peterson Space Force Base.

== History ==
Delta 7 was activated on 24 July 2020 with the redesignation of the United States Air Force's 544th Intelligence, Surveillance and Reconnaissance Group. On 3 September 2020, the delta activated the 73rd Intelligence, Surveillance, and Reconnaissance Squadron after the inactivation of the 18th Intelligence Squadron. It gained two additional squadrons on 11 September 2020 with the activation of the 71st Intelligence, Surveillance, and Reconnaissance Squadron and 72nd Intelligence, Surveillance, and Reconnaissance Squadron.

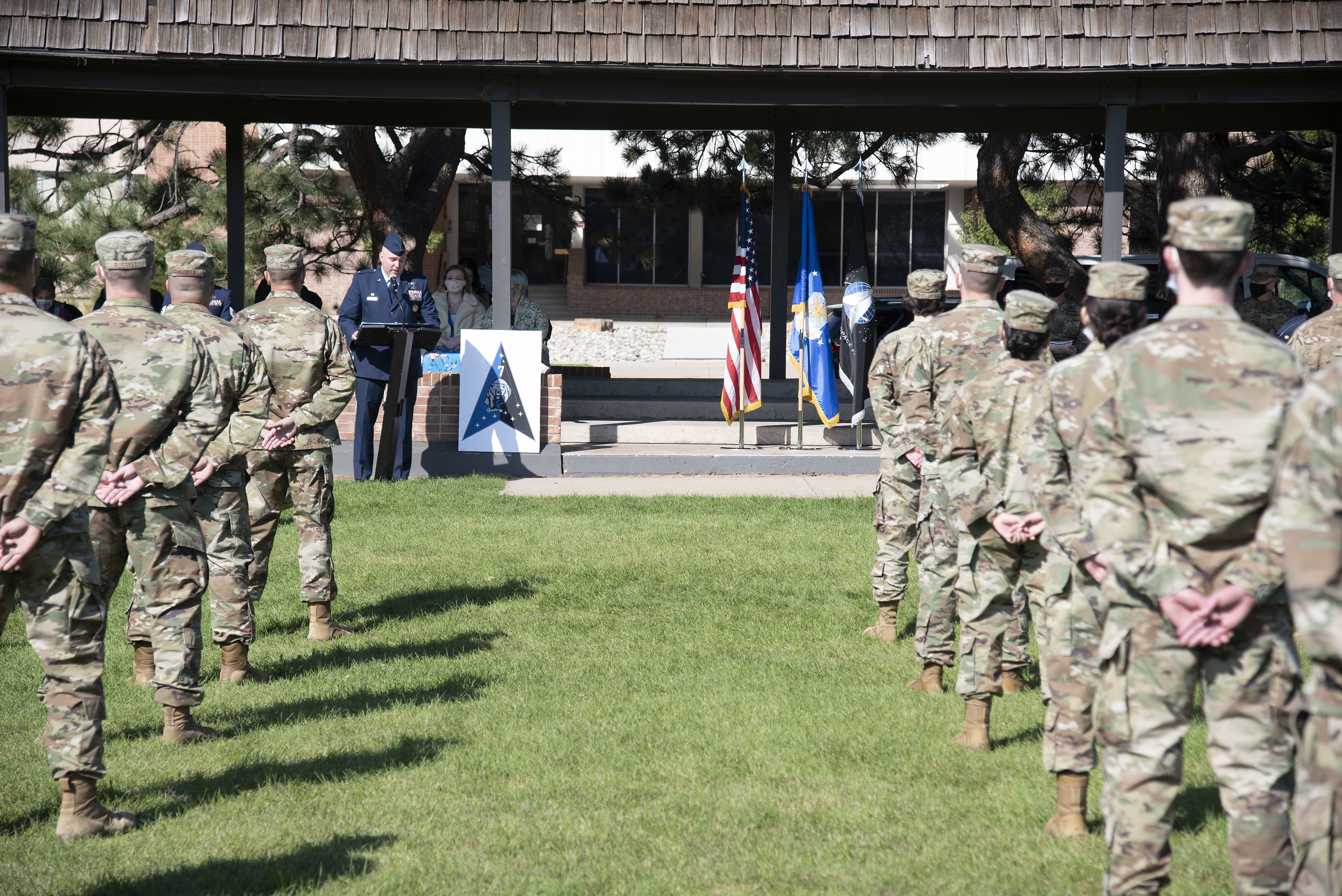
Col. Chandler Atwood speaks at the standup of ISRS 71 and 72 on September 11, 2020.

On 8 January 2021, Director of National Intelligence John Ratcliffe designated the "Space Force Intelligence, Surveillance, and Reconnaissance enterprise" the 18th member of the United States Intelligence Community.

== Emblem symbolism ==
Space Delta 7's emblem consists of the following elements:

- The midnight blue and black in the Space Delta 7 emblem signifies the orbital, airborne, and terrestrial aspects of all-domain intelligence, surveillance, and reconnaissance and its mission to fix U.S. adversaries no matter where they operate.
- The number 7 represents the Space Force Intelligence, Surveillance, and Reconnaissance professionals that executes its mission.
- The seven stars of the constellation Ursa Major represent the core of the Space Intelligence, Surveillance, and Reconnaissance Delta.
- The charging bear represents unyielding tenacity to detect and deter the United States' greatest competitors' actions in the space domain.
- The key represents unlocking the adversary's secrets to provide actionable intelligence to the warfighter.
- The delta is soaring in the direction of Polaris and provides a clear vector to true North.
- Platinum represents the foundation and structure Space Operations Command provides to Space Delta 7.

== Structure ==
Space Delta 7 is composed of the three following squadrons. It also plans to add three new squadrons: a threat analysis squadron; a targeting squadron; and a processing, exploitation, and dissemination squadron.

Squadrons
Emblem	Name	Function	Headquarters	Detachments
	71st Intelligence, Surveillance, and Reconnaissance Squadron	Intelligence, surveillance, and reconnaissance support to space mission deltas	Peterson Space Force Base, Colorado	Detachment 1: Buckley Space Force Base, Colorado; 5 other detachments
	72nd Intelligence, Surveillance, and Reconnaissance Squadron	Intelligence, surveillance, and reconnaissance	Peterson Space Force Base, Colorado	3 detachments
	73rd Intelligence, Surveillance, and Reconnaissance Squadron	Global ISR operations to support the research, development and acquisition of future space capabilities.	Wright-Patterson Air Force Base, Ohio	Detachment 2: Osan Air Base, Korea Detachment 4: RAF Feltwell, UK; Detachment 6: Fort Meade, Maryland
	74th Intelligence, Surveillance, and Reconnaissance Squadron	Intelligence, surveillance, and reconnaissance	Schriever Space Force Base, Colorado	
	75th Intelligence, Surveillance, and Reconnaissance Squadron	Intelligence, surveillance, and reconnaissance	Schriever Space Force Base, Colorado	
	76th Intelligence, Surveillance, and Reconnaissance Squadron	Intelligence, surveillance, and reconnaissance	Wright-Patterson Air Force Base, Ohio	

== List of commanders ==
No.	Commander		Term			Ref
No.	Portrait	Name	Took office	Left office	Duration	Ref
1	Chandler P. Atwood	Colonel; Chandler P. Atwood (1978–2025)	24 July 2020	7 May 2022	1 year, 287 days	
2	Brett T. Swigert	Colonel; Brett T. Swigert (born c. 1974)	7 May 2022	13 June 2024	2 years, 37 days	
3	Phoenix L. Hauser	Colonel; Phoenix L. Hauser (born c. 1979)	13 June 2024	16 June 2026	2 years, 3 days	
4	Nathaniel A. Peace	Colonel; Nathaniel A. Peace	16 June 2026	Incumbent	4 days	-

== See also ==
- National Air and Space Intelligence Center
- United States Space Force
- Space Force Intelligence Activity
