= United States Space Force Combat Forces Command =

U.S. Space Force command

USSF Combat Forces Command
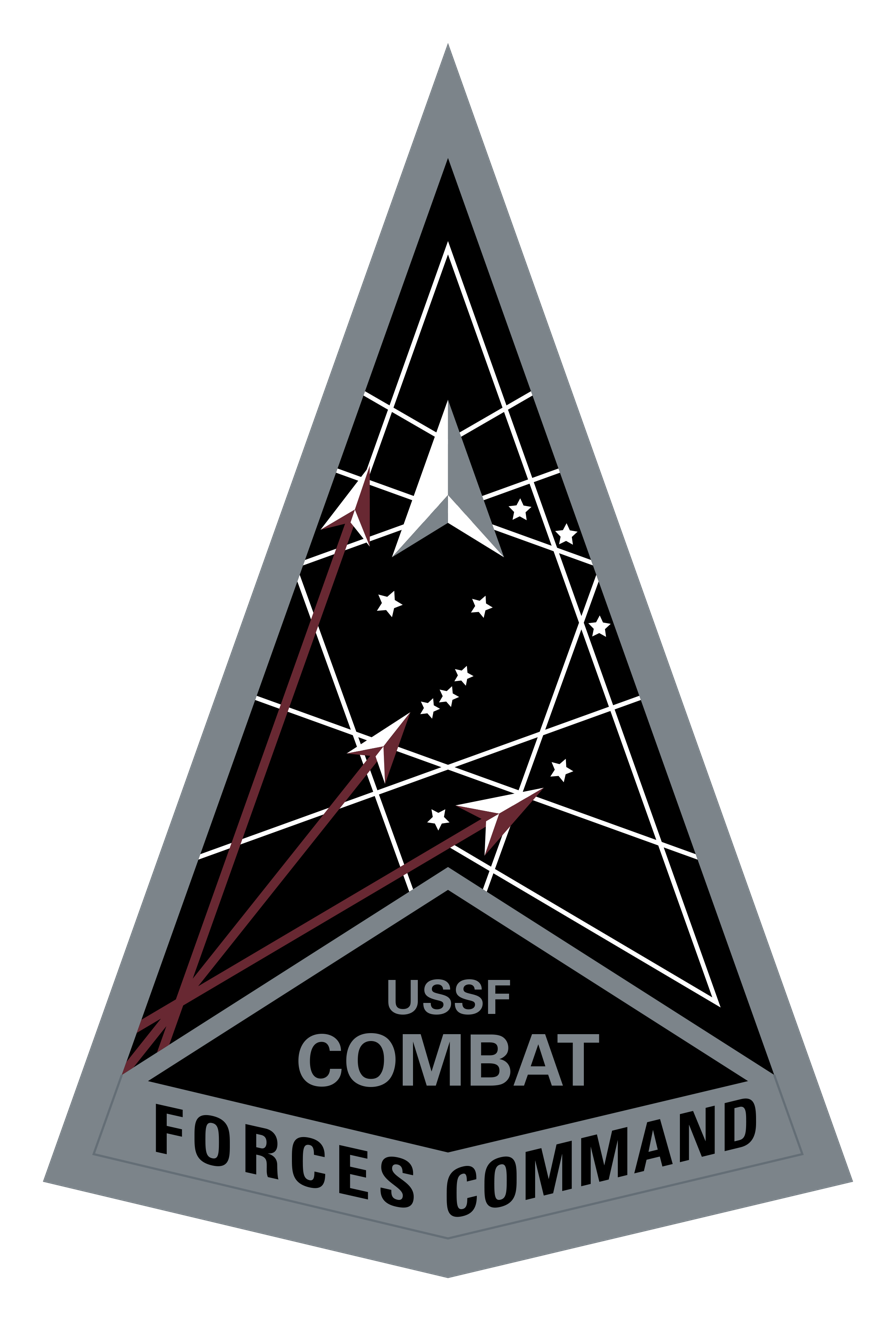
- USSF Combat Forces Command emblem
- Active: 1 September 1982 – Present (44 years, 2 months) Detailed: 3 November 2025 – Present (as USSF Combat Forces Command) 21 October 2020 – 3 November 2025 (as Space Operations Command) 1 September 1982 – 21 October 2020 (as Air Force Space Command)
- Country: United States
- Branch: United States Space Force
- Type: Field command
- Role: "Protects America and our Allies in, from, and to space… now and into the future"
- Size: 12,000 personnel
- Headquarters: Peterson Space Force Base, Colorado, U.S.
- Mottos: Semper Venator; "Always the Hunter"
- Colors: Platinum
- Engagements: Global war on terrorism

- Decorations: Air Force Organization Excellence Award
- Website: www.ussf-cfc.spaceforce.mil

Commanders
- Commander: Lt Gen Gregory J. Gagnon
- Deputy Commander: Brig Gen Casey M. Beard
- Senior Enlisted Leader: CMSgt Caleb M. Lloyd

Insignia
- Flag

United States Space Force Combat Forces Command (USSF CFC) is the United States Space Force's space operations, cyber operations, and intelligence field command. Headquartered at Peterson Space Force Base in Colorado Springs, Colorado, it consists of its mission deltas and garrison commands.

It was established on 1 September 1982 as Space Command (SPACECOM), the first dedicated U.S. space command. On 15 November 1985, it was renamed Air Force Space Command (AFSPC or AFSPACECOM) to distinguish it from U.S. Space Command, Naval Space Command, and Army Space Command. On 20 December 2019, after the establishment of the United States Space Force as an independent service, Air Force Space Command was redesignated as United States Space Force (USSF) and served as the transitional headquarters of the new service, but remained a component of the U.S. Air Force. On 21 October 2020, United States Space Force was redesignated as Space Operations Command (SpOC) and officially transitioned from being a U.S. Air Force major command to a U.S. Space Force field command. On 3 November 2025, Space Operations Command was redesignated as United States Space Force Combat Forces Command.

== History ==
=== Establishing Space Command ===
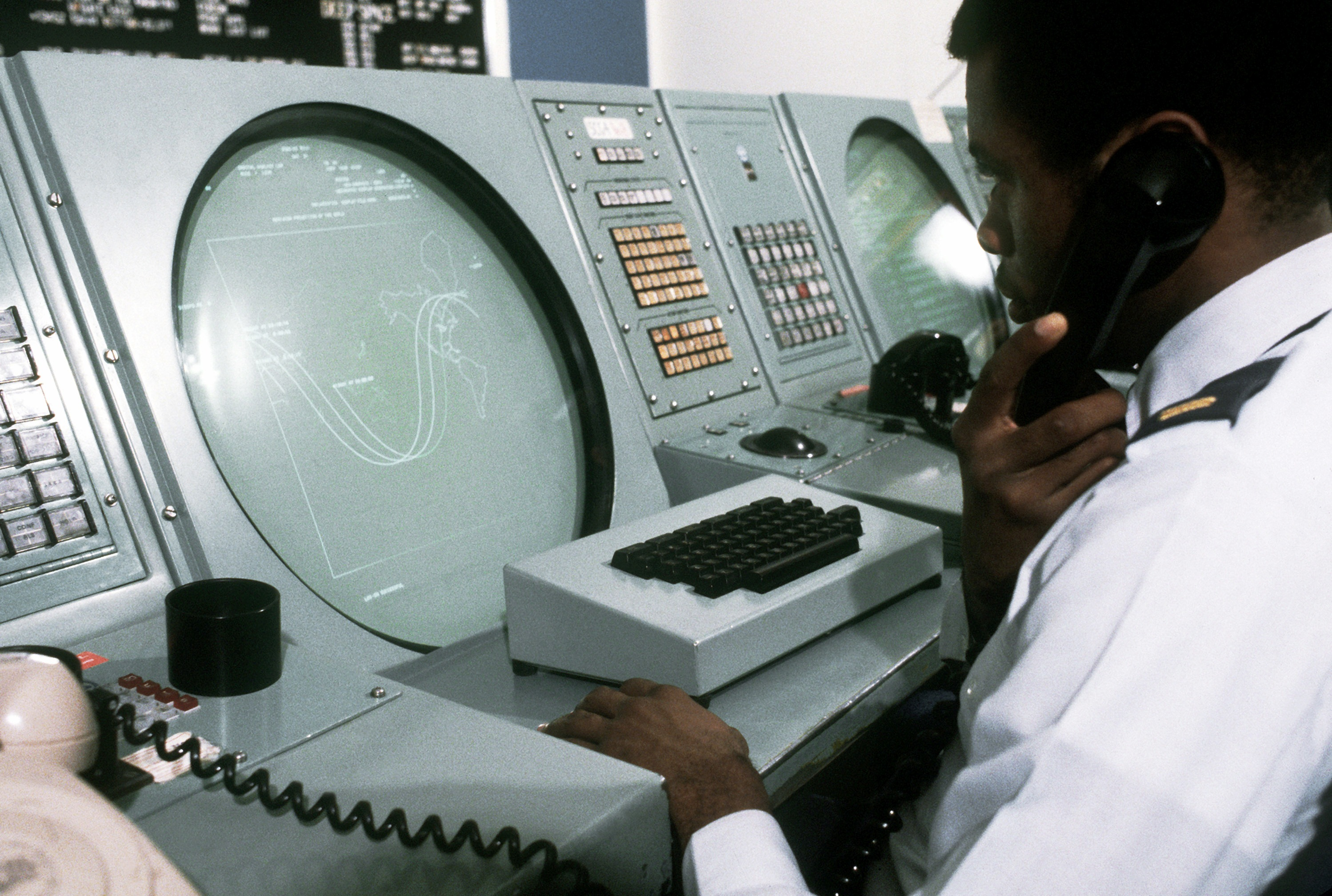
A NORAD Space Defense Center orbital analyst tracking Kosmos 1402 in 1983

As U.S. Air Force space programs began to mature in the 1970s and in the early 1980s, their disjointed nature presented operational problems. The impending entry into service of the Space Shuttle in partnership with NASA sparked major competition between Air Force commands for internal control. Air Force Systems Command's Space and Missile Systems Organization had responsibility for military development of the shuttle, but it also sought operational responsibility as it was responsible for space launches. Aerospace Defense Command argued that its responsibility for the space surveillance system gave it the requisite experience required for shuttle operations. Traditional air defense had also lost its importance, and Aerospace Defense Command saw space operations as a way to preserve its existence.

Strategic Air Command and Military Airlift Command, which served as the Air Force's lead on transportation, also argued they should have responsibility. In 1980, Aerospace Defense Command was inactivated as an Air Force major command (although preserved as a specified command within NORAD), with its air defense mission transferred to Tactical Air Command in 1979 and its space assets moved to Strategic Air Command in 1980. Calls for an independent space command grew within the 1980s, with some in Congress even calling for the Air Force to be reorganized as the U.S. Aerospace Force. On 1 September 1982, the Air Force established Space Command as a major command, creating the first operational space command within the United States Armed Forces.

=== Unifying Space Forces under Air Force Space Command ===
Space divisions, wings, and groups
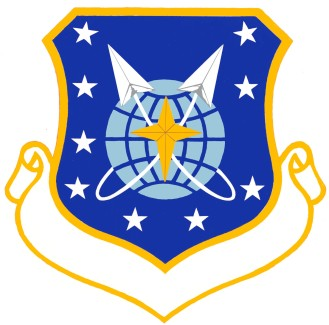
9th Space Division

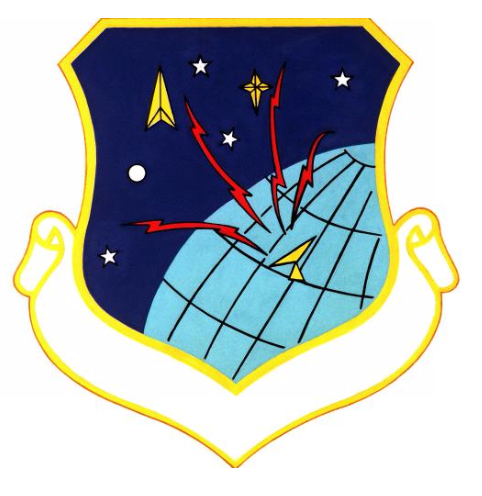
Space Communications Division

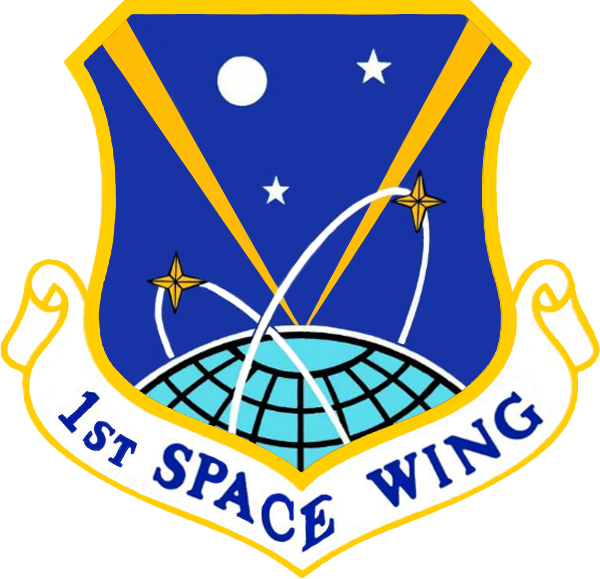
1st Space Wing

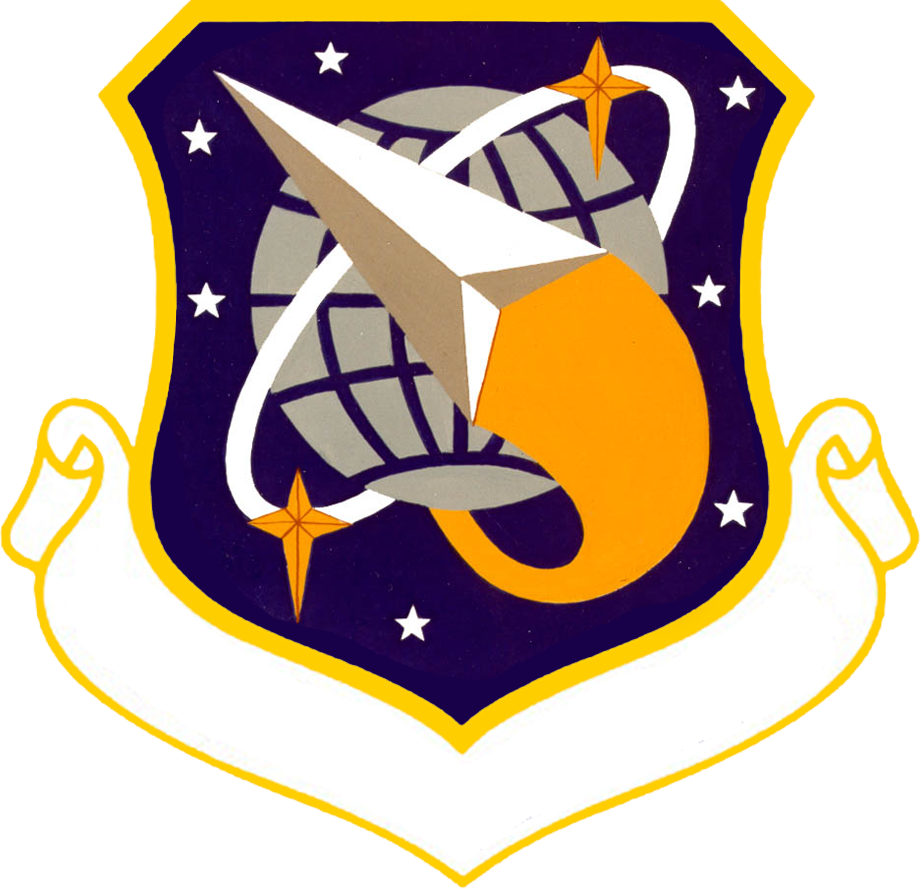
2d Space Wing

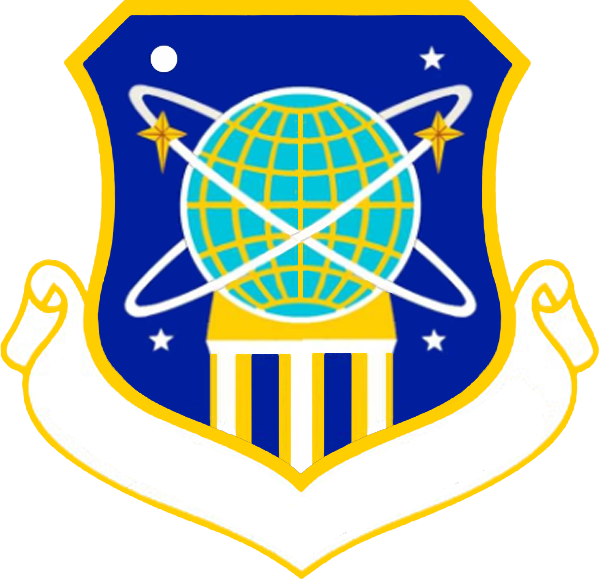
3d Space Support Wing

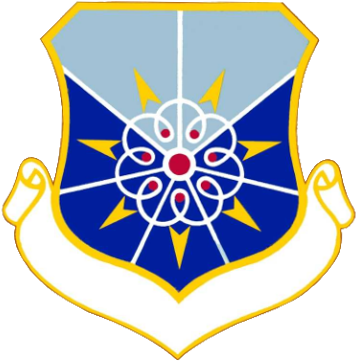
73d Space Group

When Space Command was established, it was headquartered at Peterson Air Force Base, Colorado and consisted of the Aerospace Defense Center and Cheyenne Mountain Support Group. In 1983, Strategic Air Command began to transfer its space and missile warning, systems, bases, and units to Space Command, establishing the 1st Space Wing on 1 January 1983. Major transfers from Strategic Air Command included Peterson Air Force Base, Thule Air Base, Sondrestrom Air Base, Clear Air Force Station, and responsibility for the creation of Falcon Air Force Station. By 1984, Strategic Air Command ceased to be responsible for space operations, transferring the Defense Meteorological Satellite Program and Defense Support Program, as well as operational responsibility for the Military Strategic and Tactical Relay and Global Positioning System, both of which were in development. In 1985, Space Command activated the 2d Space Wing and renamed to Air Force Space Command on 15 November, to distinguish itself from Naval Space Command and the new United States Space Command. In 1986, Air Force Space Command established the 3rd Space Support Wing and inactivated the Aerospace Defense Center and Cheyenne Mountain Support Group. In 1989, the 73d Space Surveillance Group was activated under Air Force Space Command, centralizing its space surveillance capabilities.

Unlike Strategic Air Command, Air Force Systems Command was reluctant to transfer its space assets. The Air Force Satellite Control Network was not reassigned to Air Force Space Command until 1987. The Combined Space Operations Center would not be fully transferred over until 1993 Space launch would remain under Air Force Systems Command until 1990, when Air Force Space Command began a gradual takeover. While Air Force Space Command had sought the mission since its activation, Air Force Systems Command had fought the change at every turn. Delta II and Atlas E launches transferred first, followed by the Atlas II, Titan II, and Titan IV. On 1 October 1990, Air Force Systems Command transferred Patrick Air Force Base, Cape Canaveral Air Force Station, and Vandenberg Air Force Base to Air Force Space Command. On the same day, the 9th Space Division and Space Communications Division were activated to manage launch functions.

=== The Gulf War, Space Commission, and Global War on Terrorism ===
Space air forces, centers, and wings
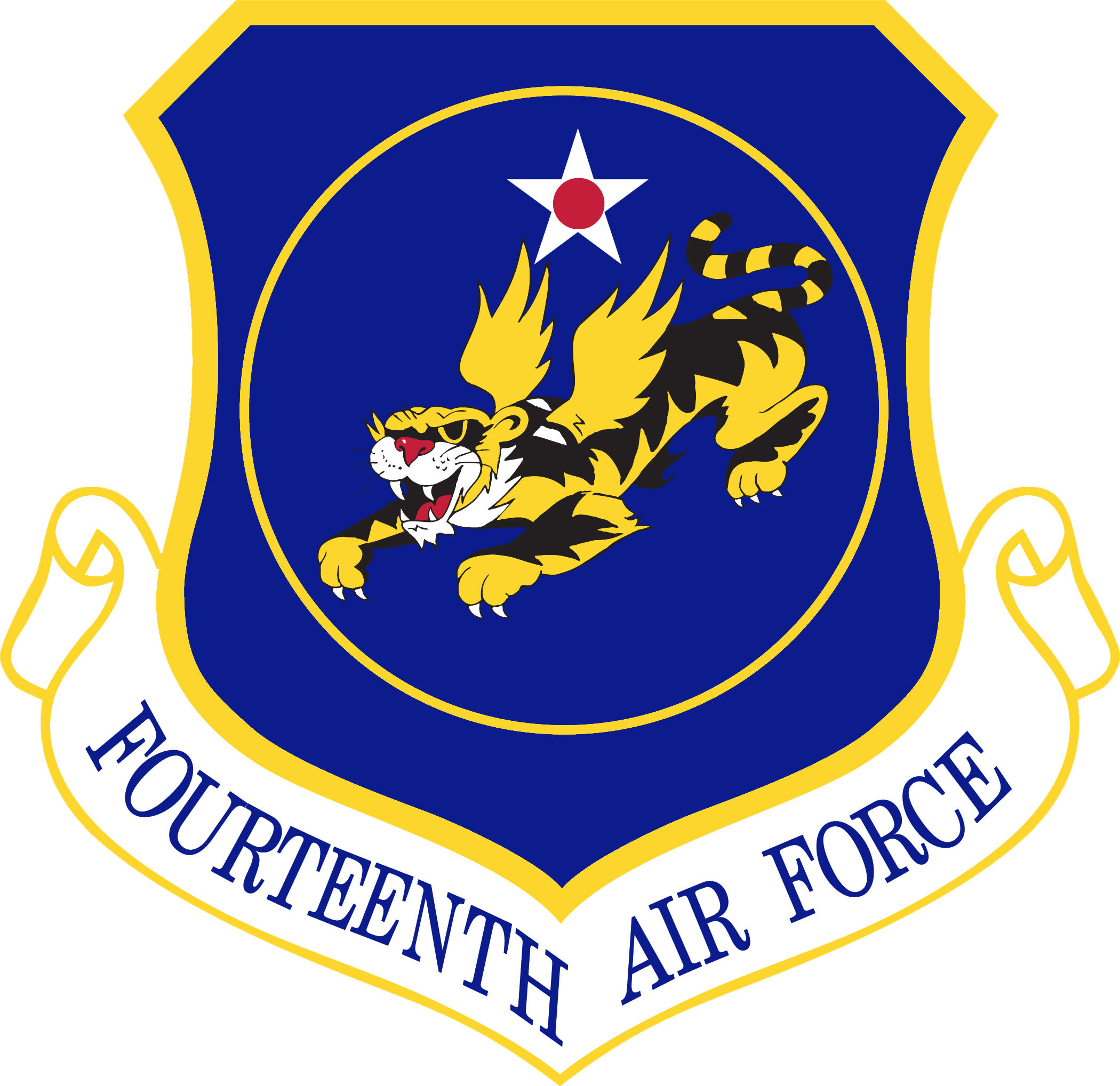
Fourteenth Air Force

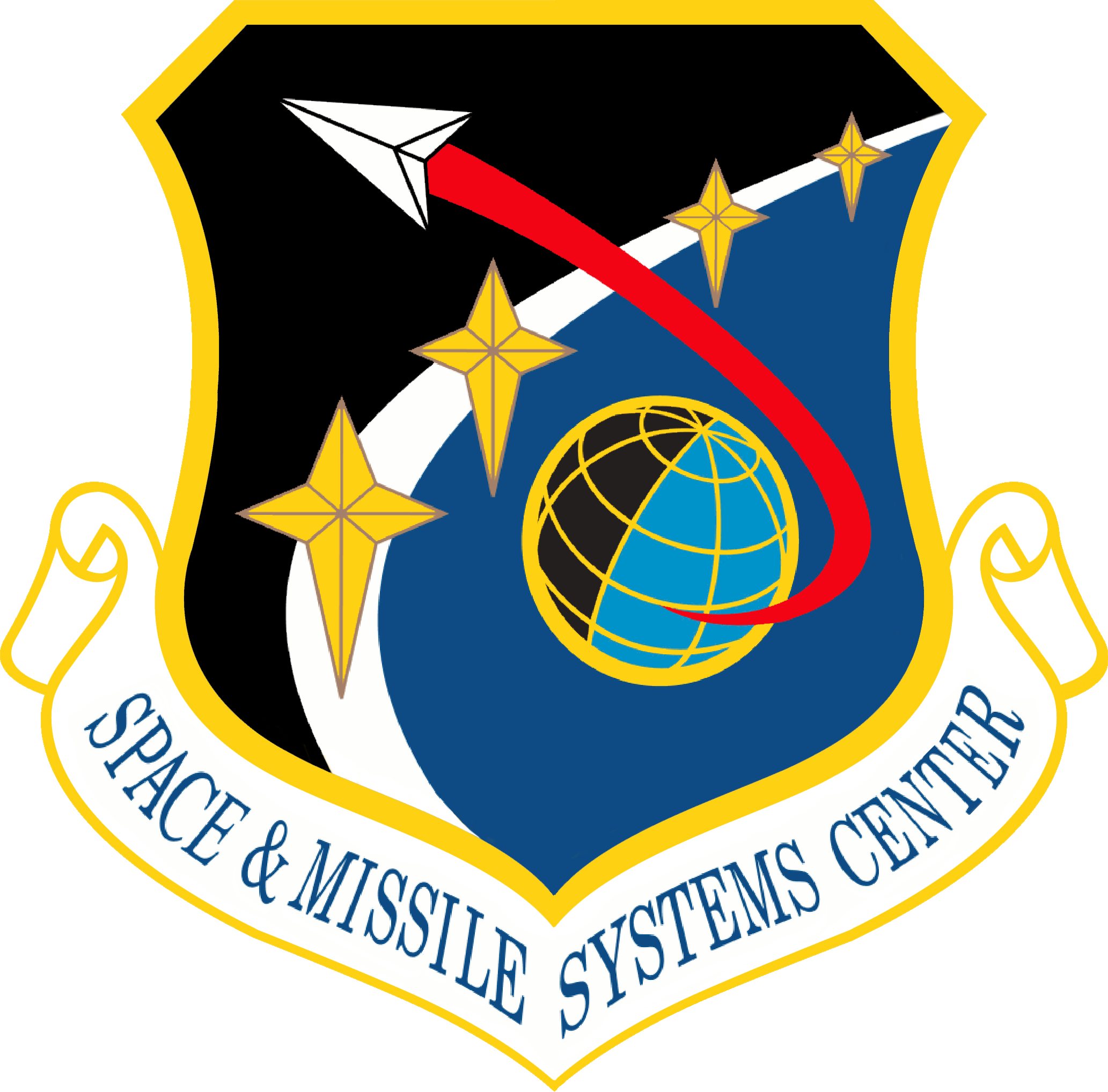
Space and Missile Systems Center

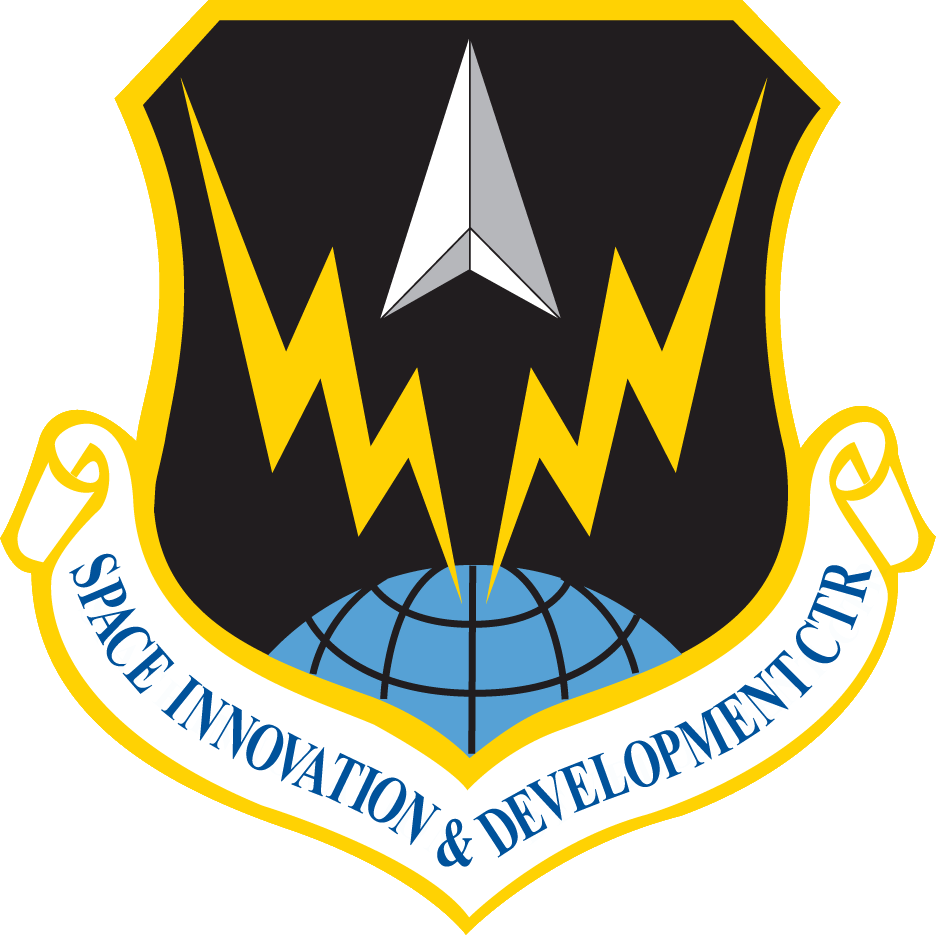
Space Innovation and Development Center

614th Air and Space Operations Center

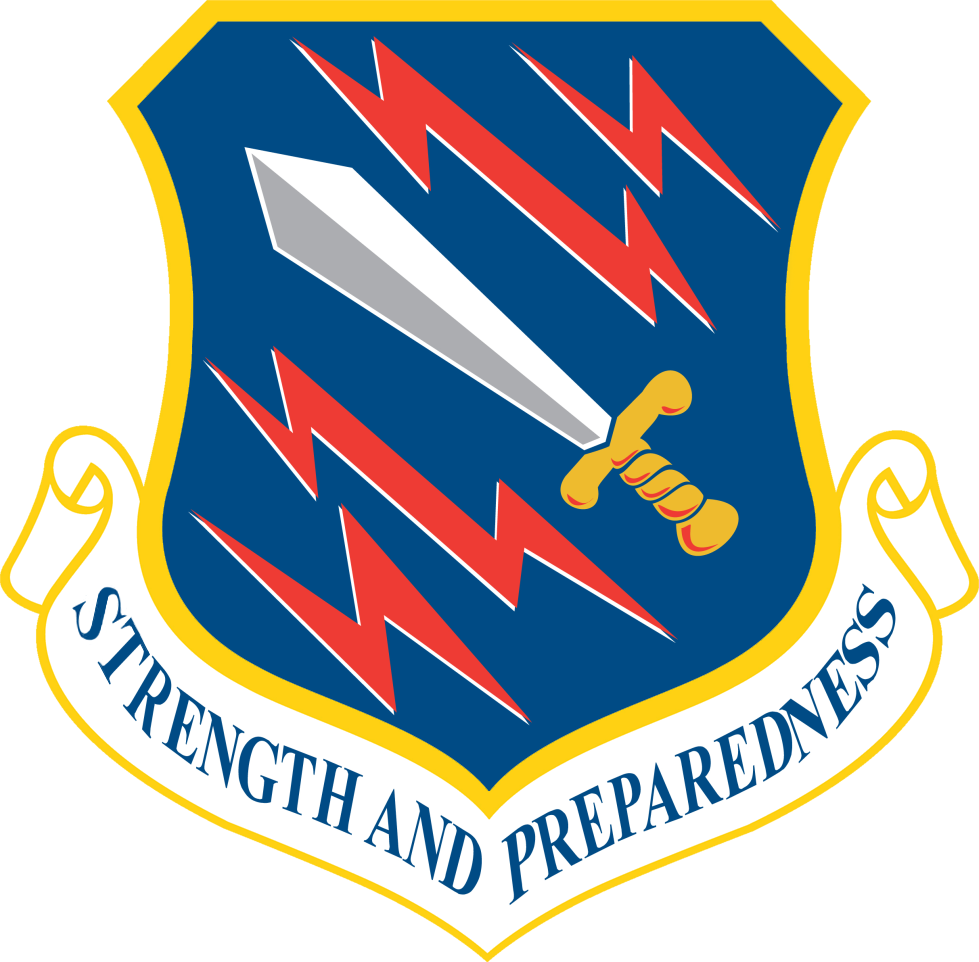
21st Space Wing

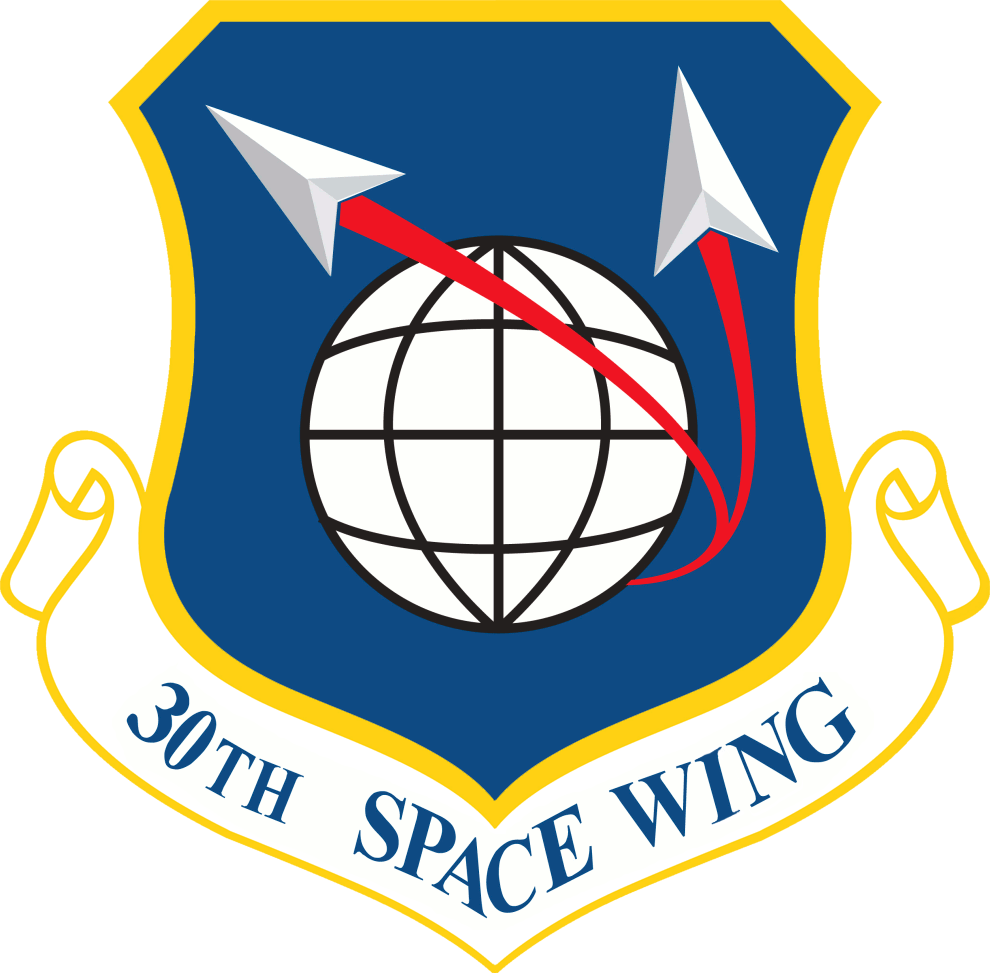
30th Space Wing

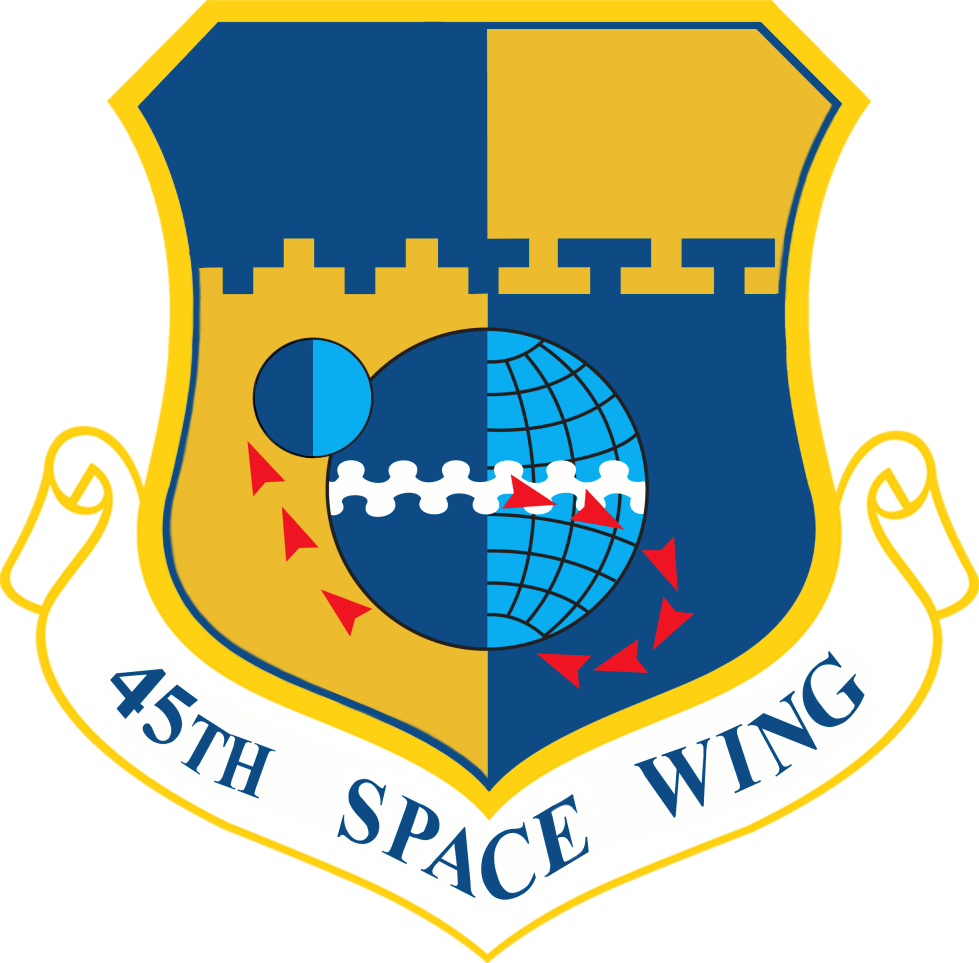
45th Space Wing

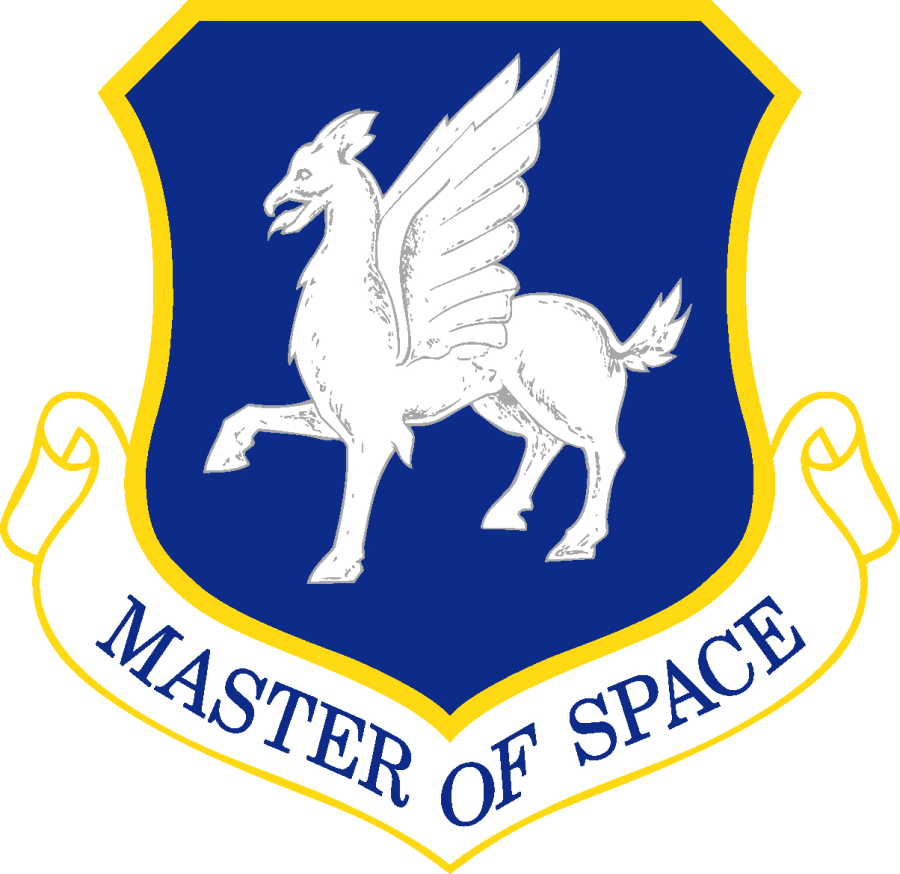
50th Space Wing

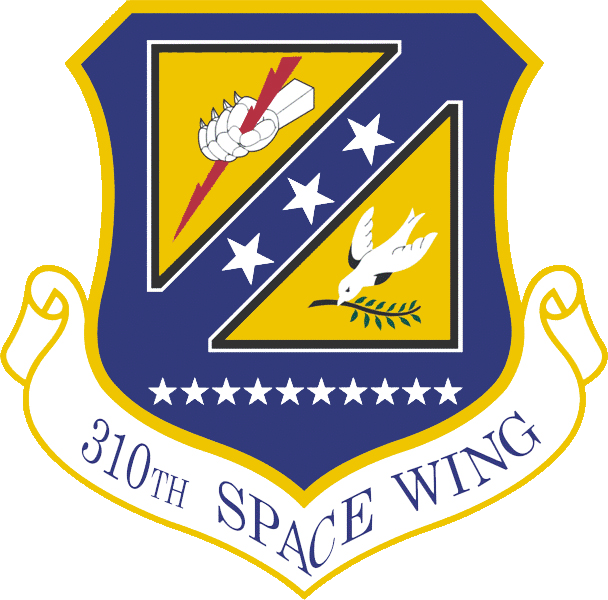
310th Space Wing (Reserve)

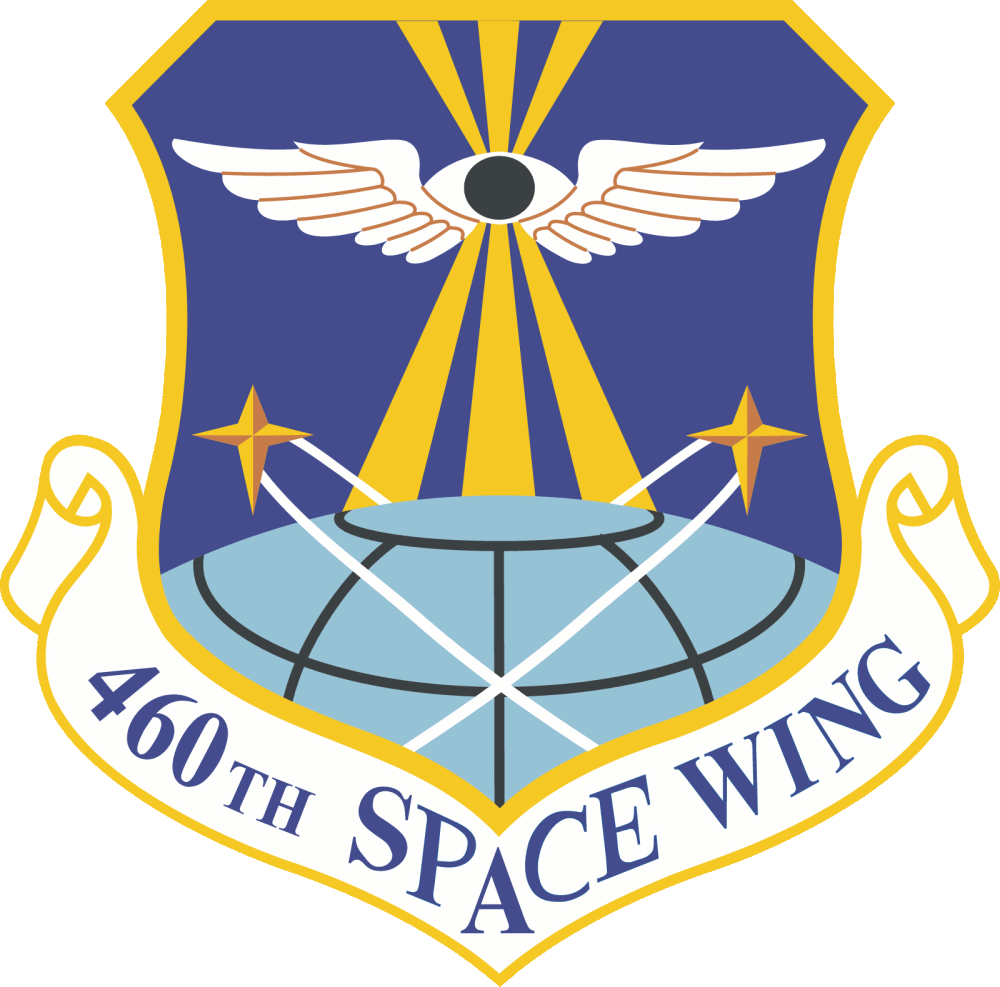
460th Space Wing

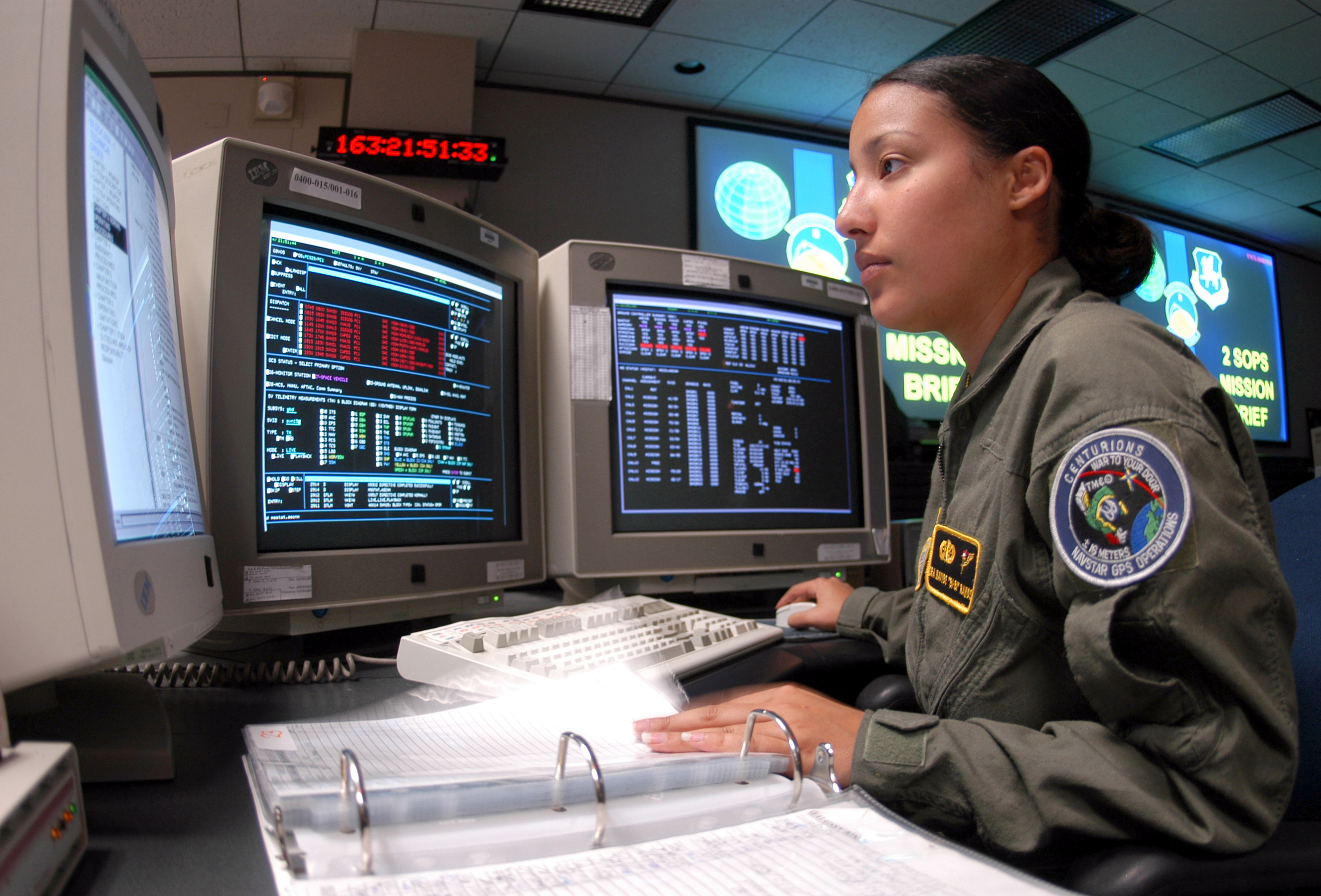
A space systems operator from the 2nd Space Operations Squadron operating the Global Positioning System in 2004

Air Force Space Command provided significant support to coalition forces during the Gulf War, providing communications and navigation through the Defense Satellite Communications System and Global Positioning System. Missile warning against SCUDs was provided by the Defense Support Program and weather forecasting through the Defense Meteorological Support Program. Space forces operations were so decisive that the Gulf War was named the "first space war" by General Merrill McPeak and its status was elevated within the Air Force.

In 1991, Air Force Space Command underwent a major reorganization, inactivating the 9th Space Division and Space Communications Division and replacing it with the 30th Space Wing at Vandenberg AFB and 45th Space Wing at Patrick AFB for space launches. In 1992, it replaced the 1st Space Wing with the 21st Space Wing, the 2d Space Wing with the 50th Space Wing, and inactivated the 3d Space Support Group. In 1993, Air Force Space Command was assigned responsibility for intercontinental ballistic missiles. It centralized its space forces under the Fourteenth Air Force and its missile forces under the 20th Air Force, while also activating the Space Warfare Center. In 2001, following the recommendation of the Space Commission, the Space and Missile Systems Center was transferred from Air Force Materiel Command to Air Force Space Command, unifying space acquisitions and operations under the same command. This gave Air Force Space Command a unique status among the other Air Force major commands, as it was the only one to be responsible for its own acquisition. After the September 11 attacks, Air Force Space Command provided space support to the global war on terrorism.

In 2009, the Air Force decided to consolidate its nuclear forces, split between Air Force Space Command's Twentieth Air Force missiles and Air Combat Command's Eighth Air Force bombers, under Air Force Global Strike Command. Twentieth Air Force was transferred on 1 December 2009, however Air Force Space Command had been assigned the cyberspace mission in the same year, assuming responsibility for Twenty-Fourth Air Force, the Air Force Network Integration Center, and Air Force Spectrum Management Office. In 2013, the Space Innovation and Development Center (previously the Space Warfare Center) was inactivated and merged with the Air Force Warfare Center. In 2018, the cyber mission and Twenty-Fourth Air Force were transferred to Air Combat Command leaving Air Force Space Command with sole responsibility for space forces.

Missile air forces, wings, and groups (1993–2009)
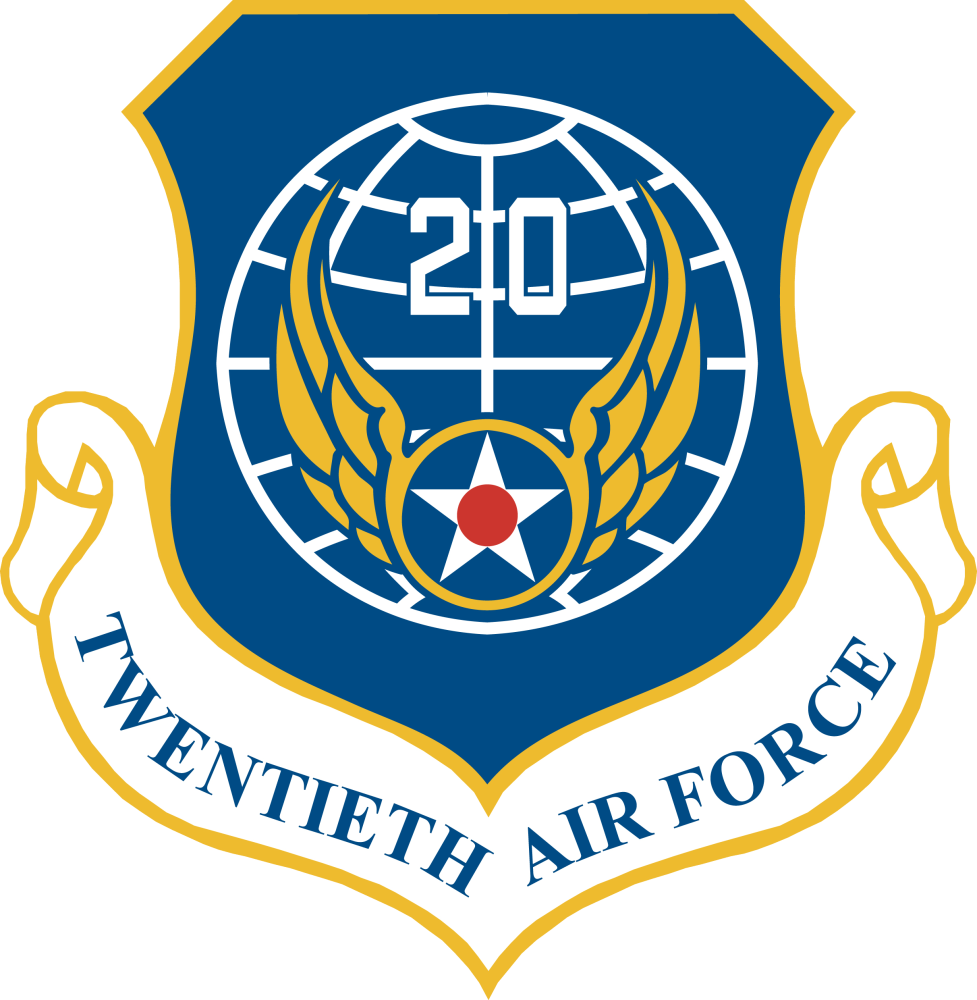
Twentieth Air Force

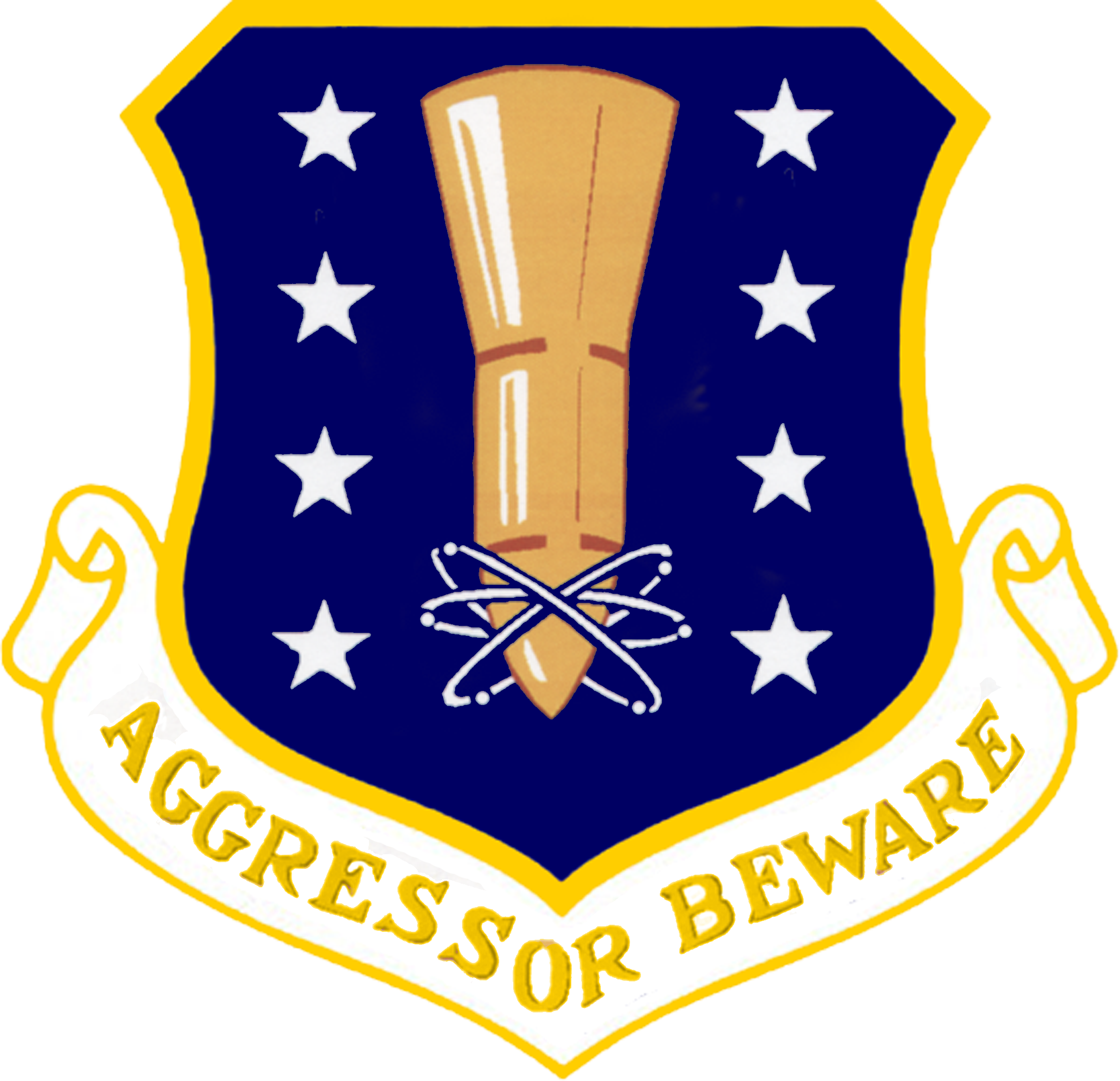
44th Missile Wing

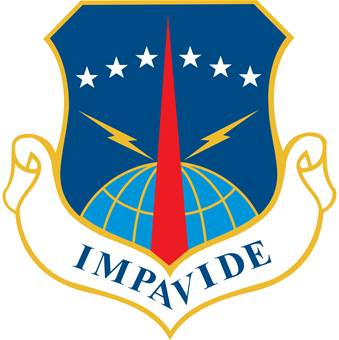
90th Space Wing

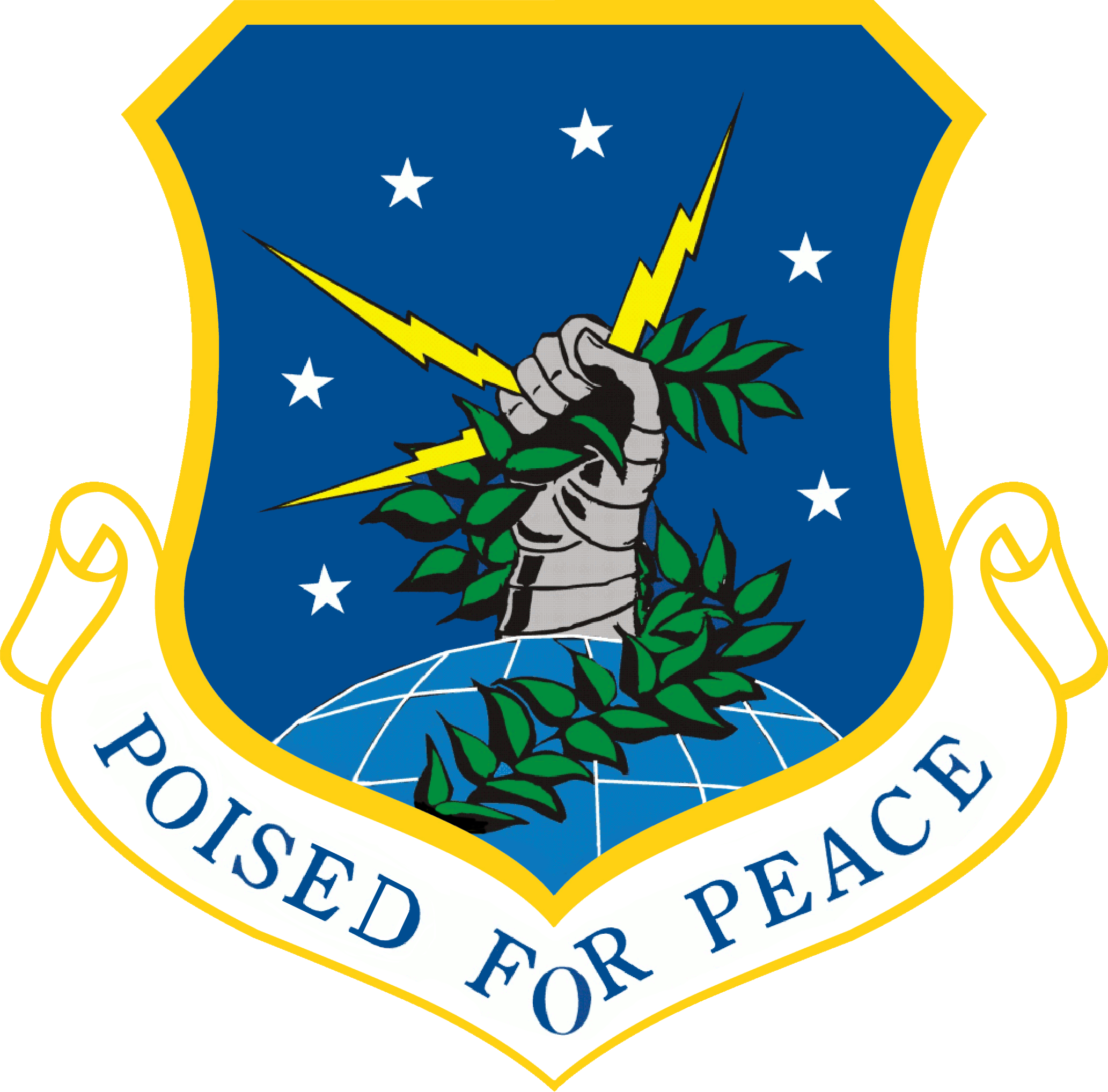
91st Space Wing

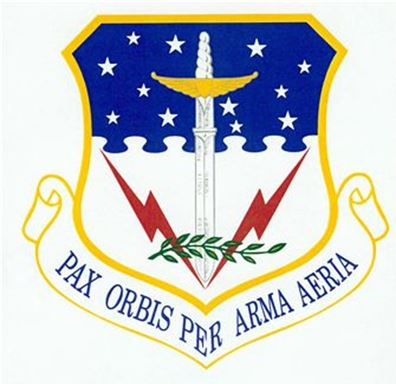
341st Space Wing

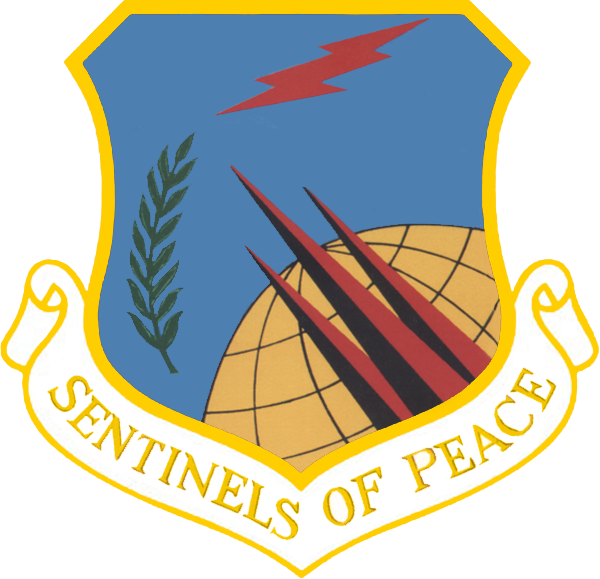
351st Missile Wing

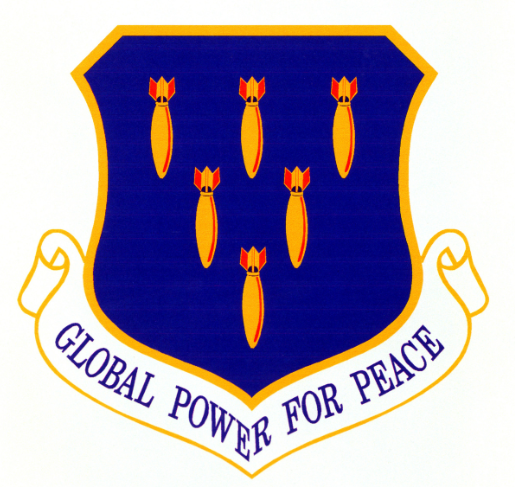
321st Missile Group
Cyber air forces, agencies, centers, and wings (2009–2018)
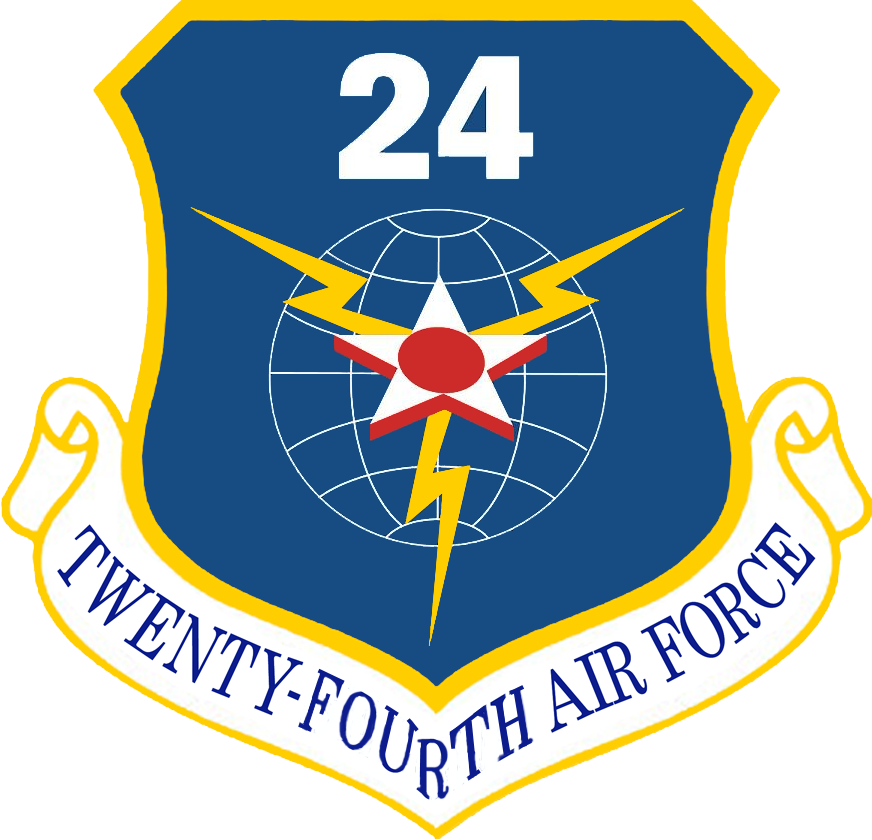
Twenty-Fourth Air Force

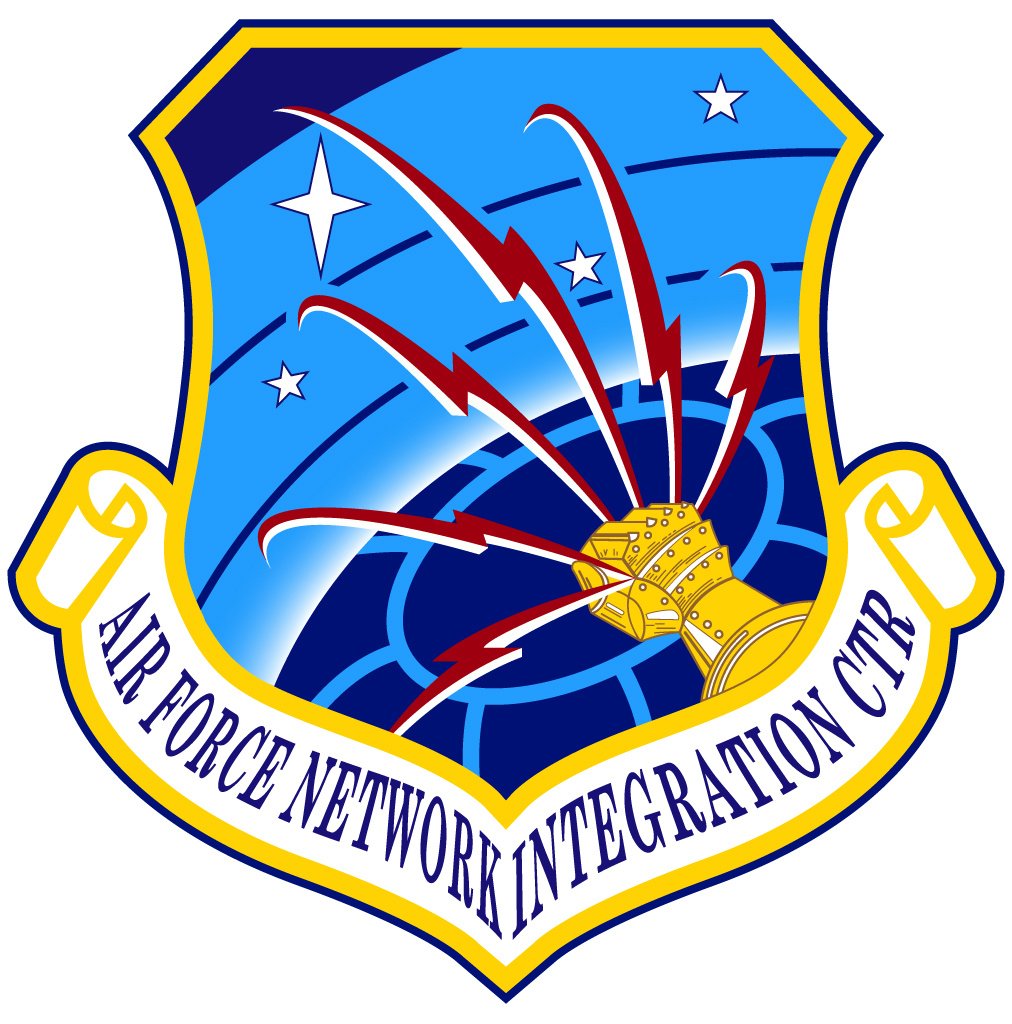
Air Force Network Integration Center

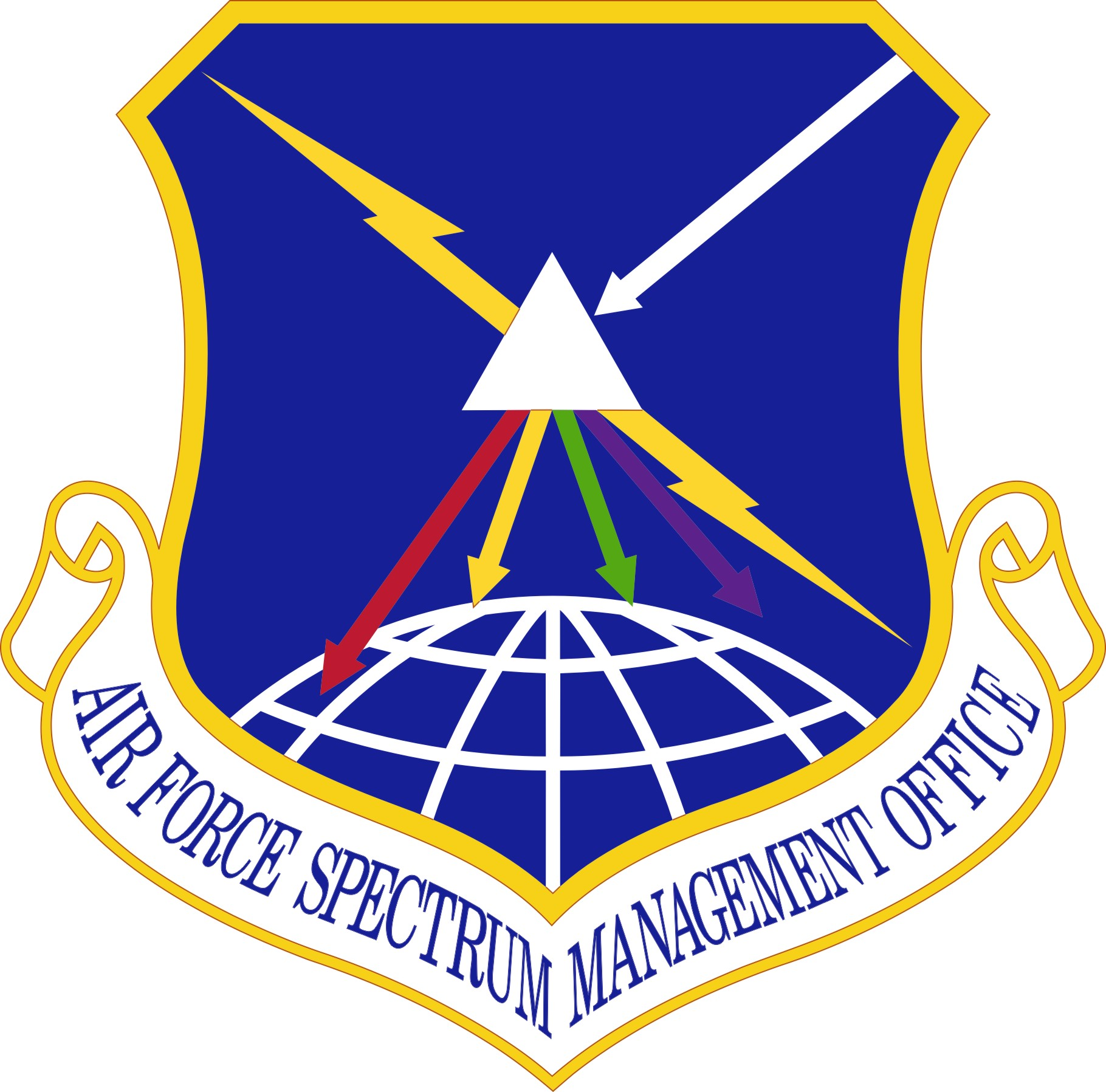
Air Force Spectrum Management Office

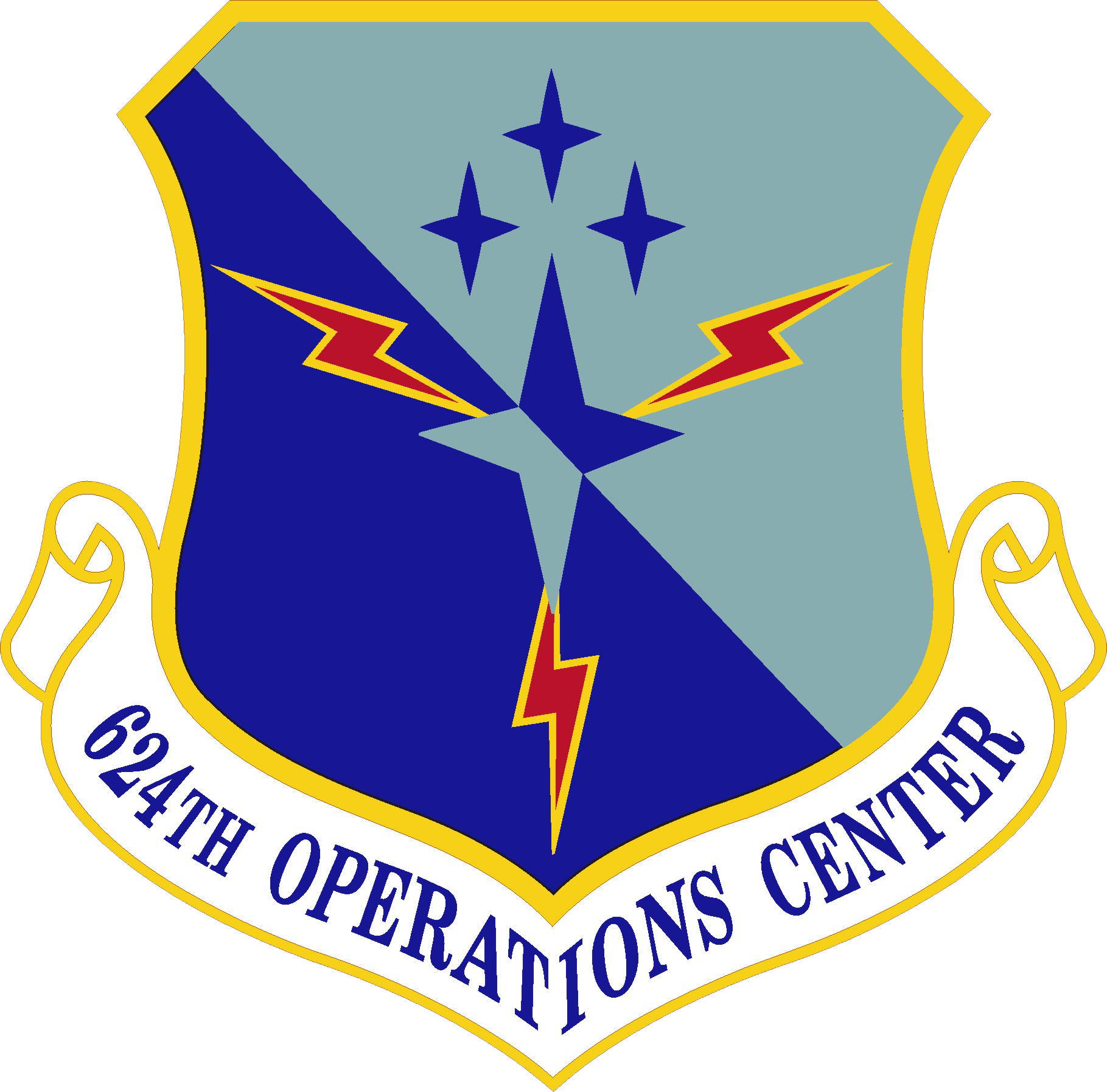
624th Operations Center

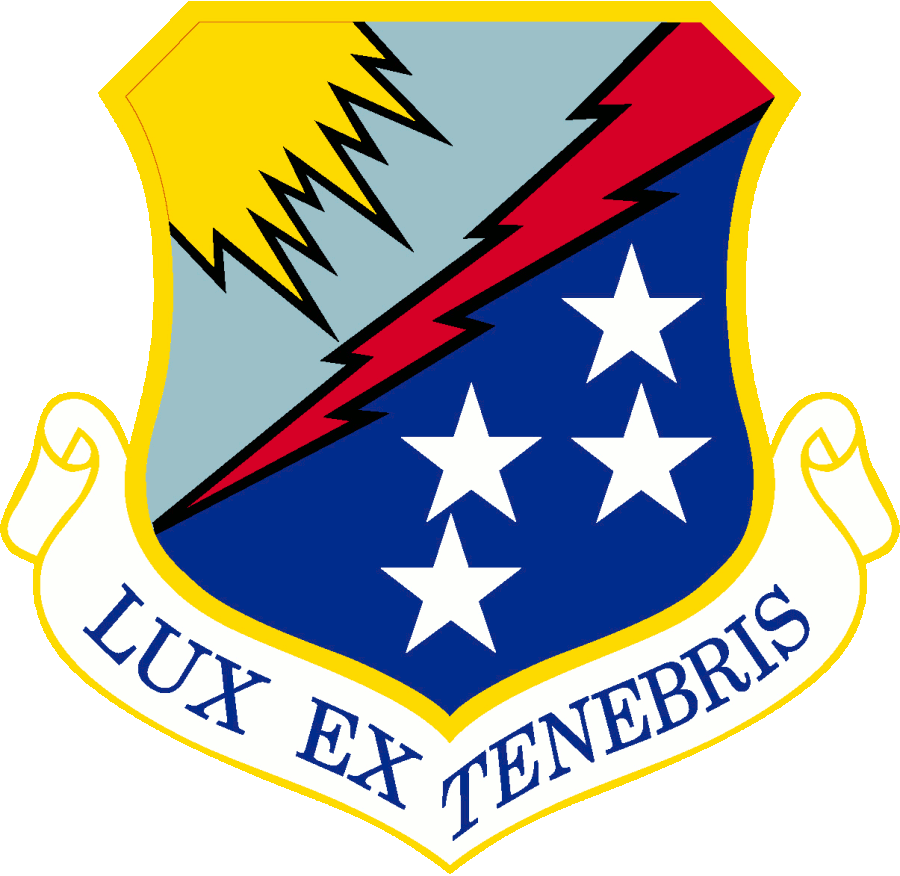
67th Cyberspace Wing

688th Cyberspace Wing

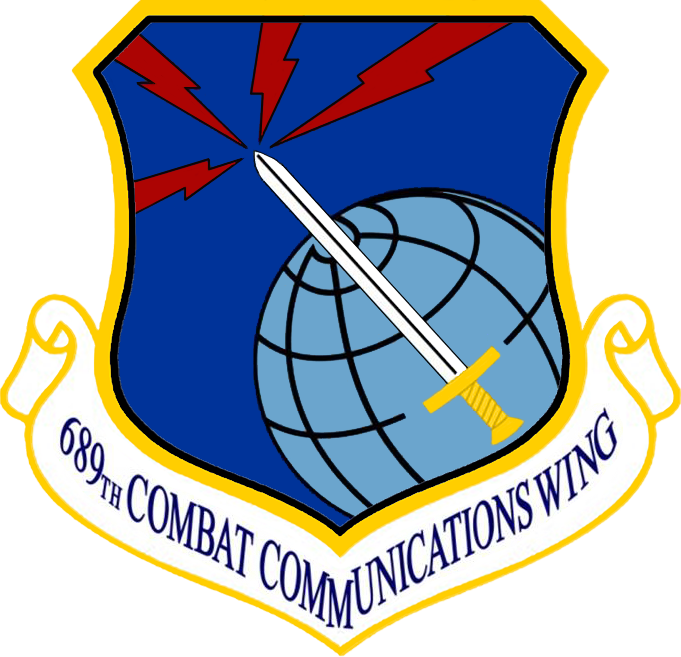
689th Combat Communications Wing

=== Redesignation as Space Operations Command and transfer to the Space Force ===
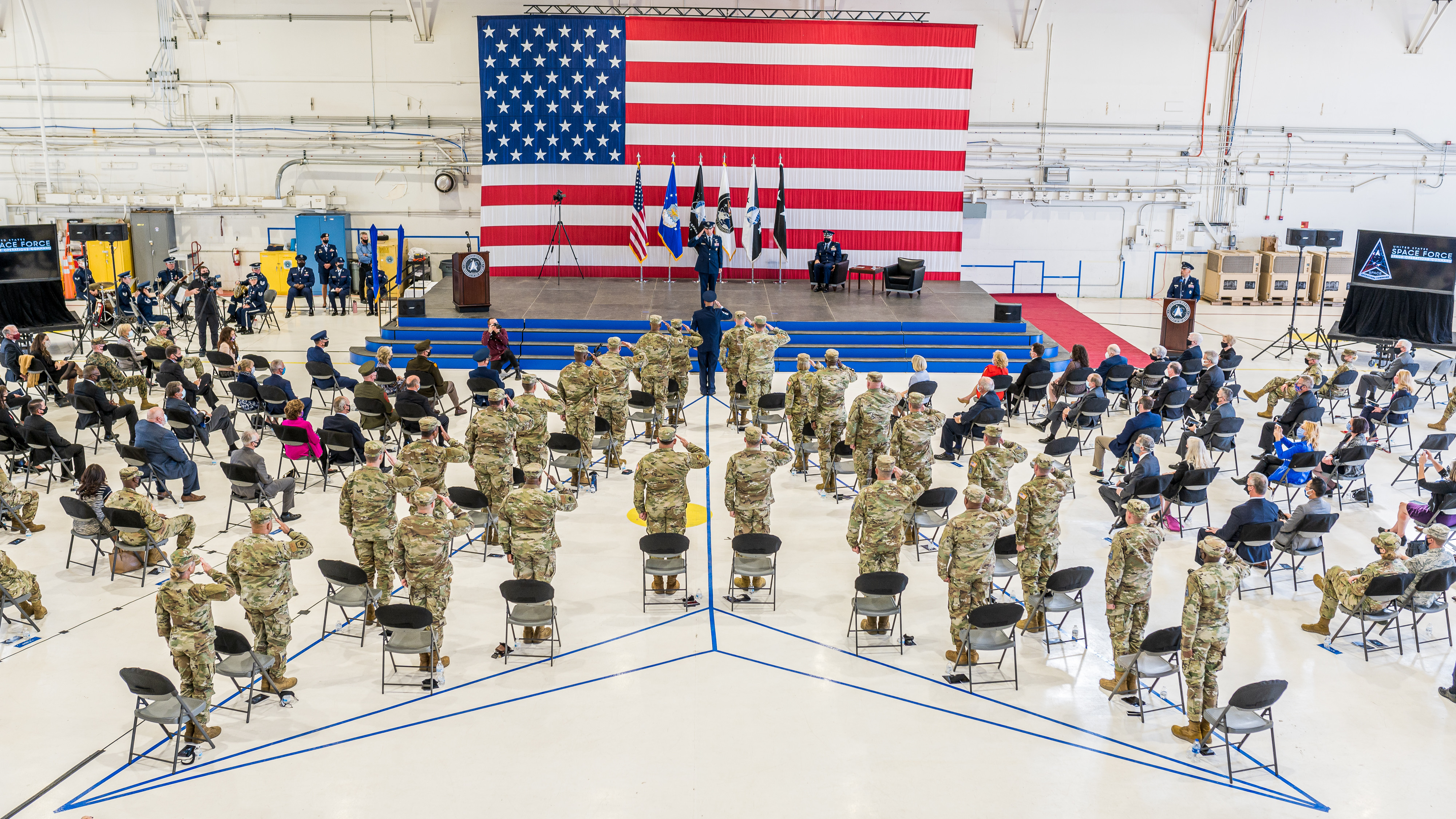
SpOC establishment ceremony at Peterson Air Force Base, October 2020

When the United States Space Force was established as an independent service on 20 December 2019, Air Force Space Command was redesignated as United States Space Force and served as its interim headquarters, but remained part of the U.S. Air Force. Fourteenth Air Force was redesignated as Space Operations Command, however its wings, along with the Space and Missile Systems Center's 61st Air Base Group, were realigned to report directly to United States Space Force. In June 2020, the Space Force announced its plan to establish Space Operations Command as the first of three field commands, with Space Operations Command (formerly Fourteenth Air Force) at Vandenberg AFB to be renamed SpOC West.

In July 2020, United States Space Force's wings and operations groups were renamed deltas and it assumed responsibility for space operations units previously part of Air Combat Command and Air Education and Training Command, including the 544th Intelligence, Surveillance and Reconnaissance Group. The 21st Operations Group was replaced by Space Delta 2 for space domain awareness, the 721st Operations Group was replaced by Space Delta 3 for space electromagnetic warfare, the 460th Operations Group combined with elements of the 21st Operations Group to form Space Delta 4 for missile warning, the 614th Air Operations Center became Space Delta 5 for command and control, the 50th Network Operations Group became Space Delta 6 for cyberspace operations, the 544th Intelligence, Surveillance and Reconnaissance Group became Space Delta 6 for intelligence, surveillance and reconnaissance, the 50th Operations Group became Space Delta 8 for navigation warfare and satellite communications, and the 750th Operations Group became Space Delta 9 for orbital warfare. The 21st Space Wing and 50th Space Wing was replaced by Peterson-Schriever Garrison, which oversaw Peterson Air Force Base, Schriever Air Force Base, Cheyenne Mountain Air Force Station, Pituffik Space Base, New Boston Air Force Station, and Kaena Point Satellite Tracking Station, while the 460th Space Wing was replaced by Buckley Garrison, which oversaw Buckley Air Force Base, Cape Cod Air Force Station, Cavalier Air Force Station, and Clear Air Force Station. The 25th Space Range Squadron, 328th Weapons Squadron, 527th Aggressor Squadron, and 533rd Training Squadron were incorporated into Space Training and Readiness Delta (Provisional), pending the activation of Space Training and Readiness Command as a full field command.

On 21 October 2020, United States Space Force was redesignated as Space Operations Command, officially transferring from a U.S. Air Force major command to a U.S. Space Force field command when Lieutenant General Stephen N. Whiting assumed command. In 2021, SpOC restructured its headquarters staff by dividing it into three deputy commanding general (DCG) positions, a deputy commanding general each for operations, support, and transformation. It also organized oversight of Space Deltas 2 to 9 under the deputy commanding general (operations) by creating five mission area teams (MAT): intelligence, battle management C3, componency, combat power, and information mobility.

On 22 April 2021, the Space and Missile Systems Center was realigned from Space Operations Command to the U.S. Space Force. In May 2021, the 30th Space Wing was redesignated as Space Launch Delta 30 and the 45th Space Wing redesignated as Space Launch Delta 45. On 13 August 2021, it transferred its launch deltas to Space Systems Command as it activated and on 23 August 2021 Space Training and Readiness Delta (Provisional) was inactivated and its squadrons transferred to Space Training and Readiness Command.

On 3 November 2025, Space Operations Command was officially redesignated as United States Space Force Combat Forces Command to reflect its increased focus on generating combat-ready forces as the USSF continues to evolve as a warfighting service.

== Symbolism ==
Emblems of Space Operations Command and its predecessors
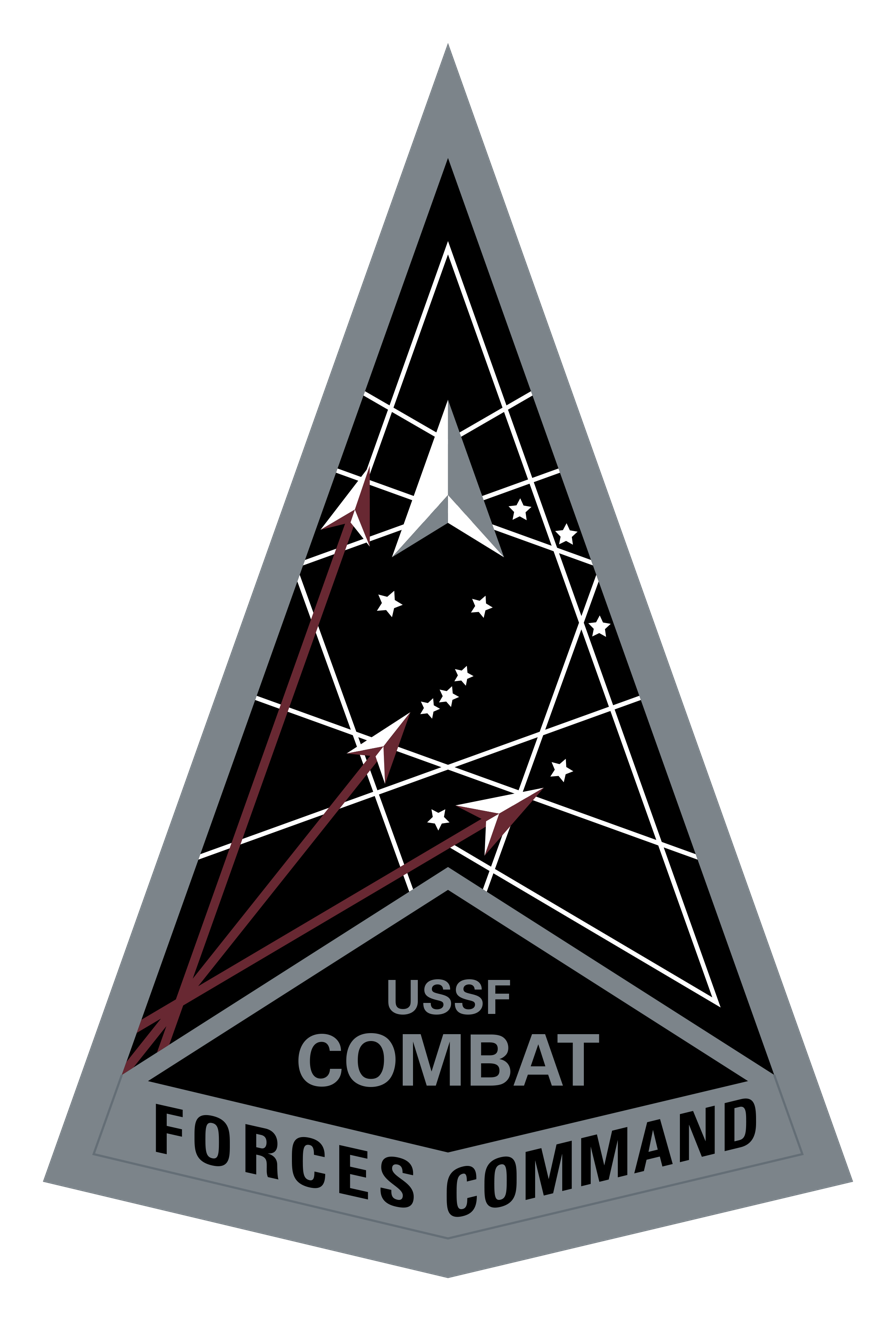
USSF Combat Forces Command (2025–Present)

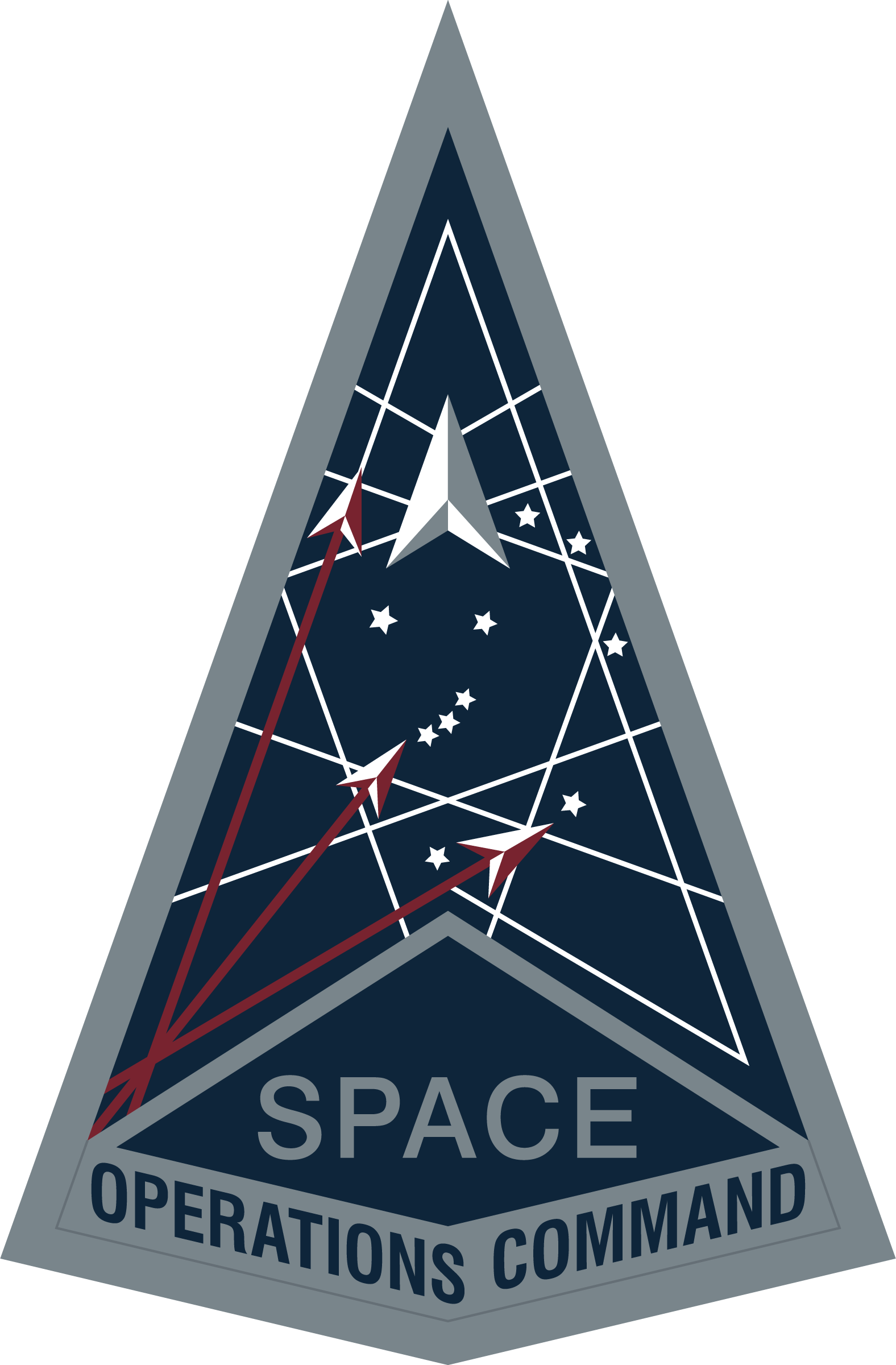
Space Operations Command (2020–2025)

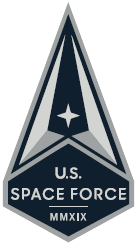
United States Space Force (2020)

Air Force Space Command and Space Command (1982–2019)

=== USSF Combat Forces Command emblem and color ===
The large delta in the USSF Combat Forces Command emblem is derived from the legacy Air Force Space Command emblem, which also is found in the Seal of the United States Space Force. It represents the people of the U.S. Space Force and the advanced systems USSF Combat Forces Command operates. The three smaller deltas, which take the shape of arrows when combined with the rocket trails behind them, are taken from the U.S. Space Command seal, represent USSF Combat Forces Command's combatant command mission and the role of its deltas, garrisons, and SpOC West to be the arrows in U.S. Space Command's warfighting quiver. They represent USSF Combat Forces Command's core competencies of operations, military intelligence, and cyber. The star field is the constellation Orion, representing the mythological Greek hunter Orion. Orion signifies that USSF Combat Forces Command will always be the predator, and never the prey. The stars that make up the constellation also pay respect to the past luminaries and leaders of military space who have built the foundation on which USSF Combat Forces Command stands.

Platinum is USSF Combat Forces Command's distinguishing color and matches the U.S. Space Force and U.S. Space Command seals. Platinum represents the strength of guardians and airmen, the rarity of its calling, and the nobility of its mission.

The emblem was originally unveiled on 21 October 2020 at Peterson Air Force Base, Colorado for Space Operations Command and only received minor edits for the redesignation as USSF Combat Forces Command.

=== Air Force Space Command emblem and motto ===
The Space Badge, which inspired the design of the Space Command emblem

The first commander of Air Force Space Command, General James V. Hartinger, suggested that the Air Force Space Command emblem be patterned after the Space Badge and the final emblem drawn on it for most of its elements.

The centrally dominant globe represents the earth as viewed from space, the earth being both the origin and control point for all space satellites. The lines of latitude and longitude emphasize the global nature of Air Force space operations. The emblem is provided its distinctive appearance by two symmetric ellipses representing the orbital paths traced by satellites in earth orbit; the satellites themselves being symbolically depicted as four point stars. The 30 degree orbital inclination and symmetrically opposed placement of the satellites signify the worldwide coverage provided by Air Force satellites in accomplishing the surveillance and communications missions. The slight tapering of the orbital ellipses represents the characteristic eastward motion. The centrally superimposed deltoid symbolizes both the Air Force upward thrust into space and the launch vehicles needed to place all satellites in orbit. The distinctive dark blue background shading, small globe, and stars symbolize the space environment.

Air Force Space Command's motto, "Guardians of the High Frontier," was developed from the submissions of three individuals at Space Command and the United States Air Force Academy before being announced on 17 February 1983. The motto later inspired the title of "Guardian" for U.S. Space Force members.

== Structure ==
Name	Space mission deltas		
Mission Delta 2	Space domain awareness	Peterson Space Force Base, Colorado	Col Raj Agrawal
Mission Delta 3	Electromagnetic warfare	Peterson Space Force Base, Colorado	Col Angelo Fernandez
Mission Delta 4	Missile warning and tracking	Buckley Space Force Base, Colorado	Col Aaron L. Cochran
Space Delta 6	Cyberspace operations	Schriever Space Force Base, Colorado	Col Christopher A. Kennedy
Space Delta 7	Intelligence, surveillance, and reconnaissance	Peterson Space Force Base, Colorado	Col Phoenix L. Hauser
Space Delta 8	Satellite communication and navigation warfare	Schriever Space Force Base, Colorado	Col Jeffrey Weisler
Space Delta 9	Orbital warfare	Schriever Space Force Base, Colorado	Col Ramsey M. Horn
Mission Delta 31	Navigation warfare	Schriever Space Force Base, Colorado	Col Andrew S. Menschner
Space base deltas
Space Base Delta 1	Mission and medical support	Peterson Space Force Base, Colorado	Col Kenneth F. L. Klock
Space Base Delta 2	Mission and medical support	Buckley Space Force Base, Colorado	Col Marcus D. Jackson
Space Base Delta 41	Mission and medical support	Schriever Space Force Base, Colorado	Col Eric D. Bogue

== List of commanders ==
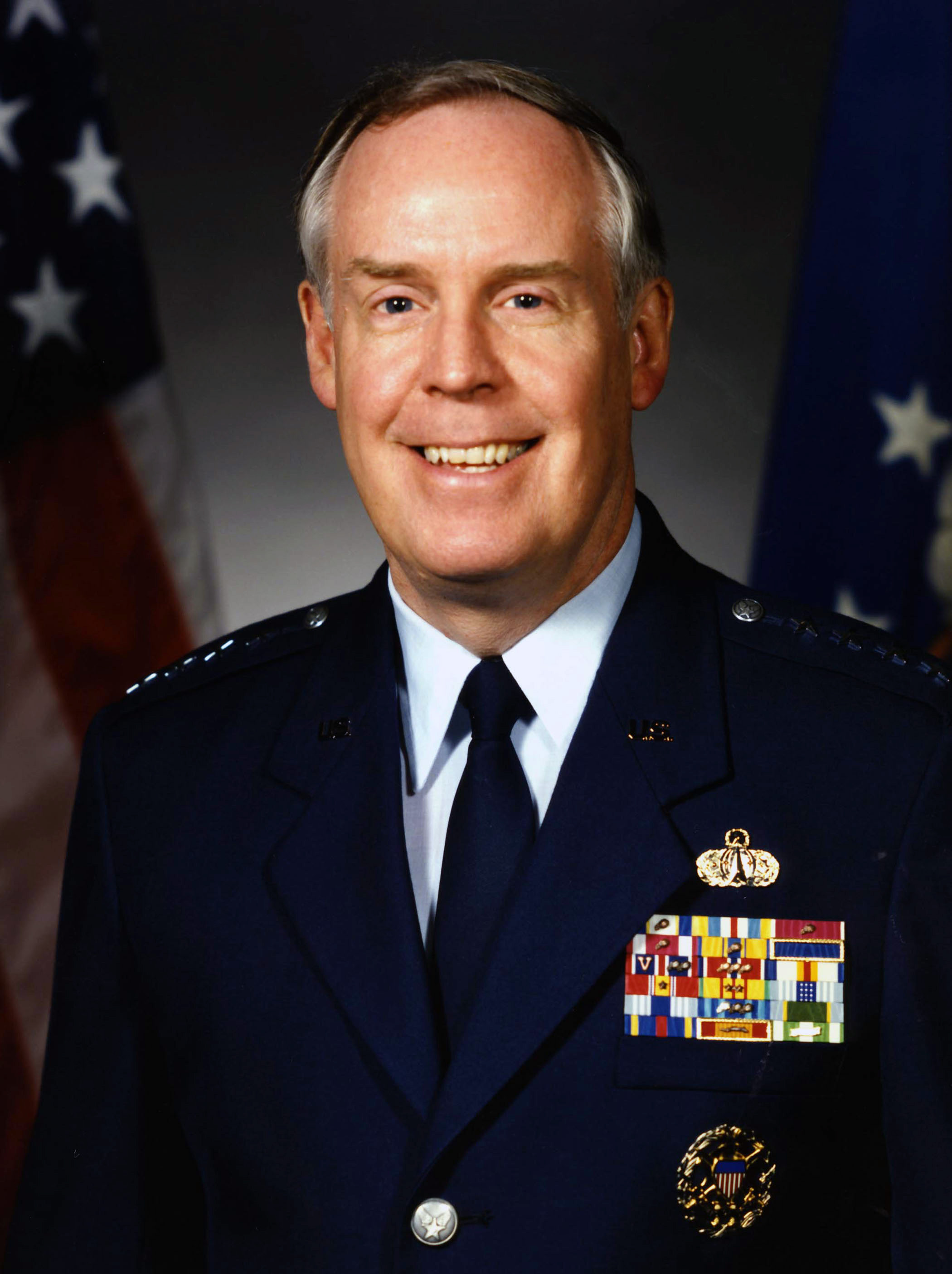
General Thomas S. Moorman Jr. was the first space operations officer to serve as commander of Air Force Space Command and be appointed a four-star general. He was the only space officer to serve as Vice Chief of Staff of the United States Air Force.

No.	Portrait	Name	Term		
No.	Portrait	Name	Took office	Left office	Duration
1	Stephen Whiting	Lieutenant General; Stephen Whiting (born 1967)	21 October 2020	9 January 2024	3 years, 80 days
2	David N. Miller	Lieutenant General; David N. Miller (born c. 1971)	9 January 2024	3 November 2025	1 year, 298 days
3	Gregory Gagnon	Lieutenant General; Gregory Gagnon (born c. 1972)	3 November 2025	Incumbent	1 year, 10 days

== Missions ==
Launch designation	Satellite designation	Date/time, UTC	Launch site	Rocket	Orbit	Project	Function	Status	Patch	Remarks
AFSPC-4	USA-253, USA-254	29 July 2014	CCSFS, SLC-37B	Delta IV Medium+ (4,2)	Geosynchronous	GSSAP-1 & 2	Space Surveillance	Entered service, status unknown		First launch under AFSPC designation.
AFSPC-5	USA 261	20 May 2015	CCSFS, SLC-41	Atlas V 501	Low Earth	X-37B OTV-4	Technology demonstration	Mission Successfully		
AFSPC-6	USA-270, USA-271	19 August 2016	CCSFS, SLC-37B	Delta IV Medium+ (4,2)	Geosynchronous	GSSAP-3 & 4	Space Surveillance	Entered service, status unknown		
AFSPC-11	USA 283, USA-284, USA-285, USA-286, USA-287	15 April 2018	CCSFS, SLC-41	Atlas V 551	Geosynchronous	CBAS-1, EAGLE & Others	Technology demonstration	Entered service, status unknown		Last Launch under AFSPC designation.
Launch designation	Satellite designation	Launch date/time (UTC)	Launch site	Rocket	Orbit	Project	Function	Status	Patch	Remarks

== See also ==
- Combined Force Space Component Command
- United States Space Command

U.S. Armed Forces forces commands

- United States Army Forces Command
- United States Marine Corps Forces Command
- United States Fleet Forces Command
- Air Combat Command
- List of USSF launches
