= Air Force Spectrum Management Office =

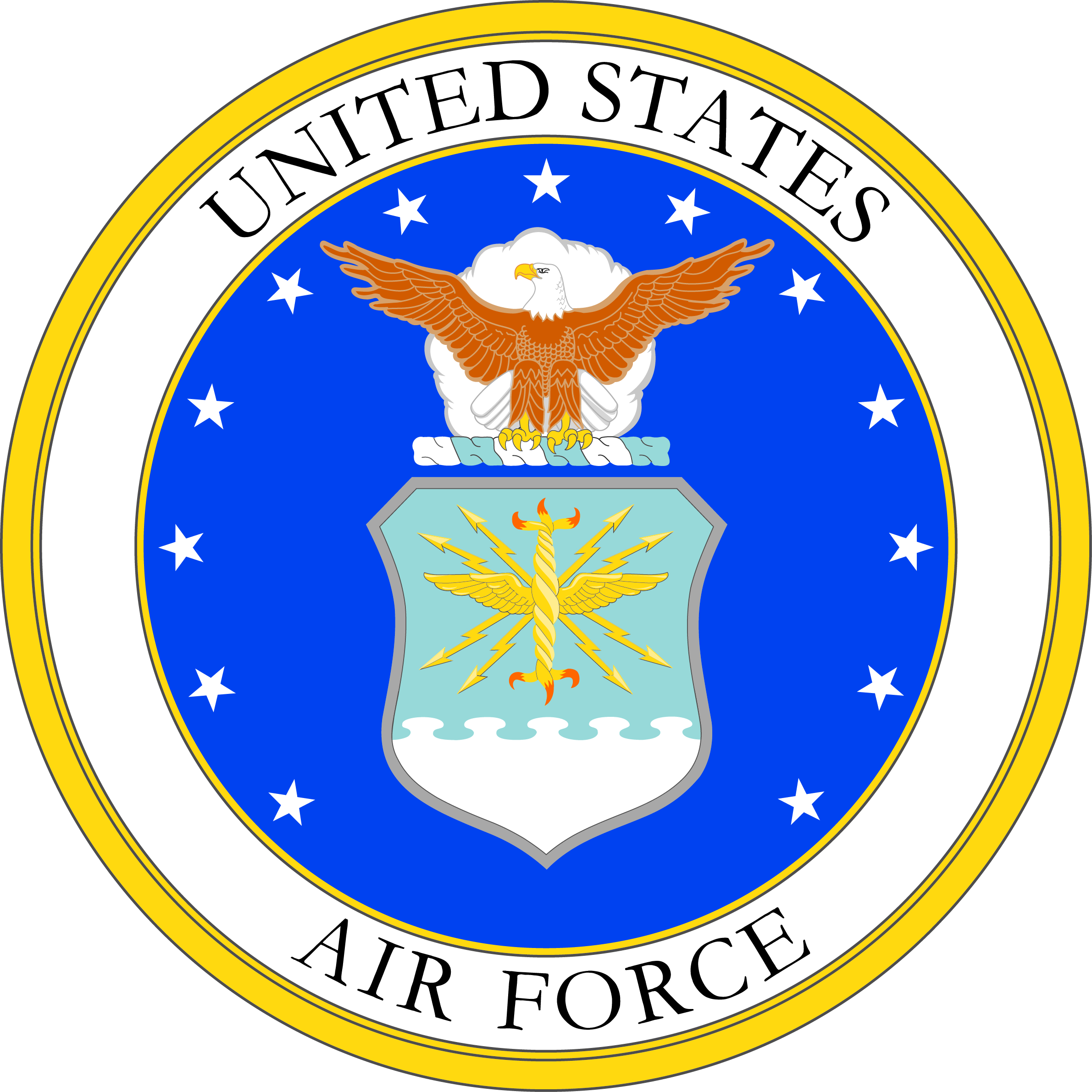
Air Force Spectrum Management Office

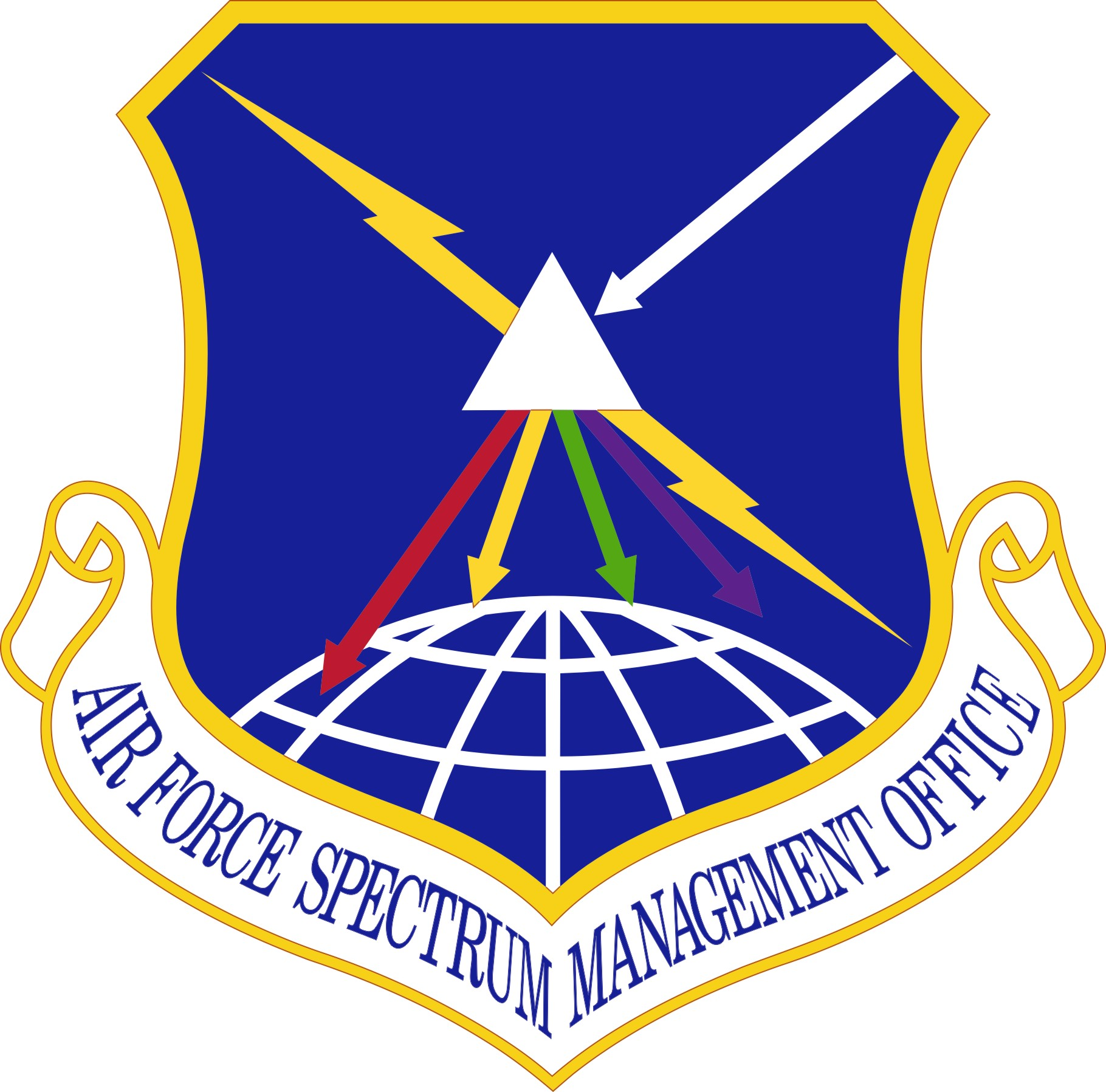
- Air Force Spectrum Management Office emblem
- Active: 1 January 1982 – present
- Country: United States
- Branch: United States Air Force
- Part of: United States Air Force
- Garrison/HQ: Fort George G. Meade, Maryland
- Mottos: "Managing Your Frequencies Anytime, Anywhere"
- Mascot: Wizard
- Decorations: Organizational Excellence Award

Commanders
- Current commander: Col. Jeffery M. Miller

The Air Force Spectrum Management Office plans, provides, and preserves access to the electromagnetic spectrum for Air Force and selected Department of Defense activities in support of national policy objectives, systems development, and global operations:

- Develops and implements spectrum guidelines and instructions to support the Air Force mission.
- Coordinates actions to resolve spectrum interference incidents involving DoD, private sector, and federal users.
- Represents, advocates, and defends Air Force interests in spectrum management matters on DoD, national and international forums.
- Accesses satellites internationally.
- Obtains certification and frequency licenses to operate satellites, land mobile radios, emergency radio systems (air-to-ground and air-to-air), radars, weapon guidance systems, and all capabilities that are spectrum-dependent.
- Provides functional management for the spectrum management career field.

In 2020 the office was realigned and integrated into the Headquarters Air Force Staff under the deputy chief of staff for intelligence, surveillance, reconnaissance and cyber effects operations (A2/6).
