= Platinum (color) =

Light metallic color

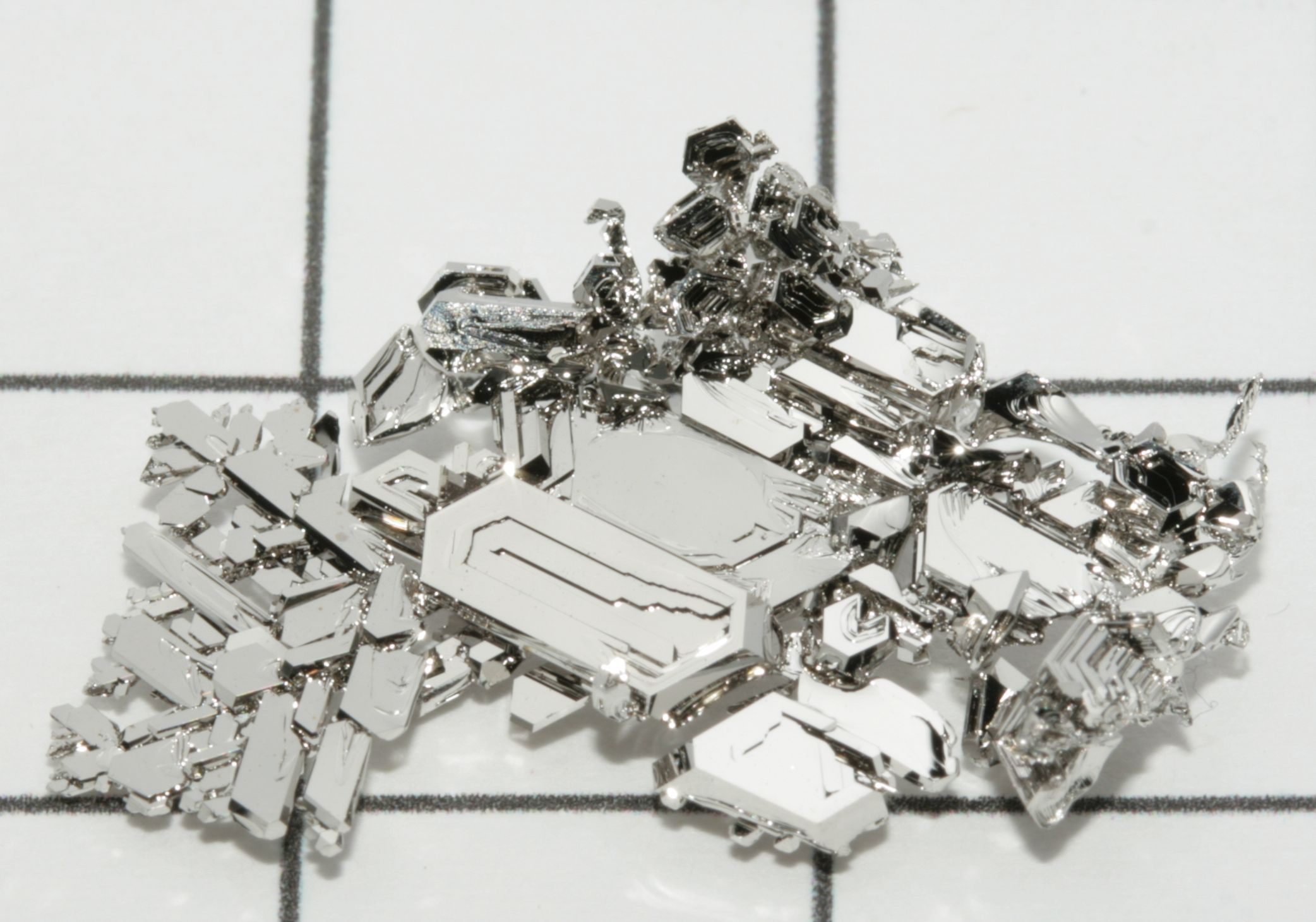
- Platinum crystals

Color coordinates
- Hex triplet: #E5E4E2
- sRGB^{B} (r, g, b): (229, 228, 226)
- HSV (h, s, v): (40°, 1%, 90%)
- CIELCh_{uv} (L, C, h): (91, 2, 68°)
- Source: /Maerz and Paul
- ISCC–NBS descriptor: Grayish white
- B: Normalized to [0–255] (byte)

Platinum is a color that is the metallic tint of pale grayish-white resembling the metal platinum.

The first recorded use of platinum as a color name in English was in 1918.

== Platinum in human culture ==
Awards

- A platinum award is not as prestigious as a diamond award, but it is more prestigious than a gold, silver, or bronze award.

Credit cards

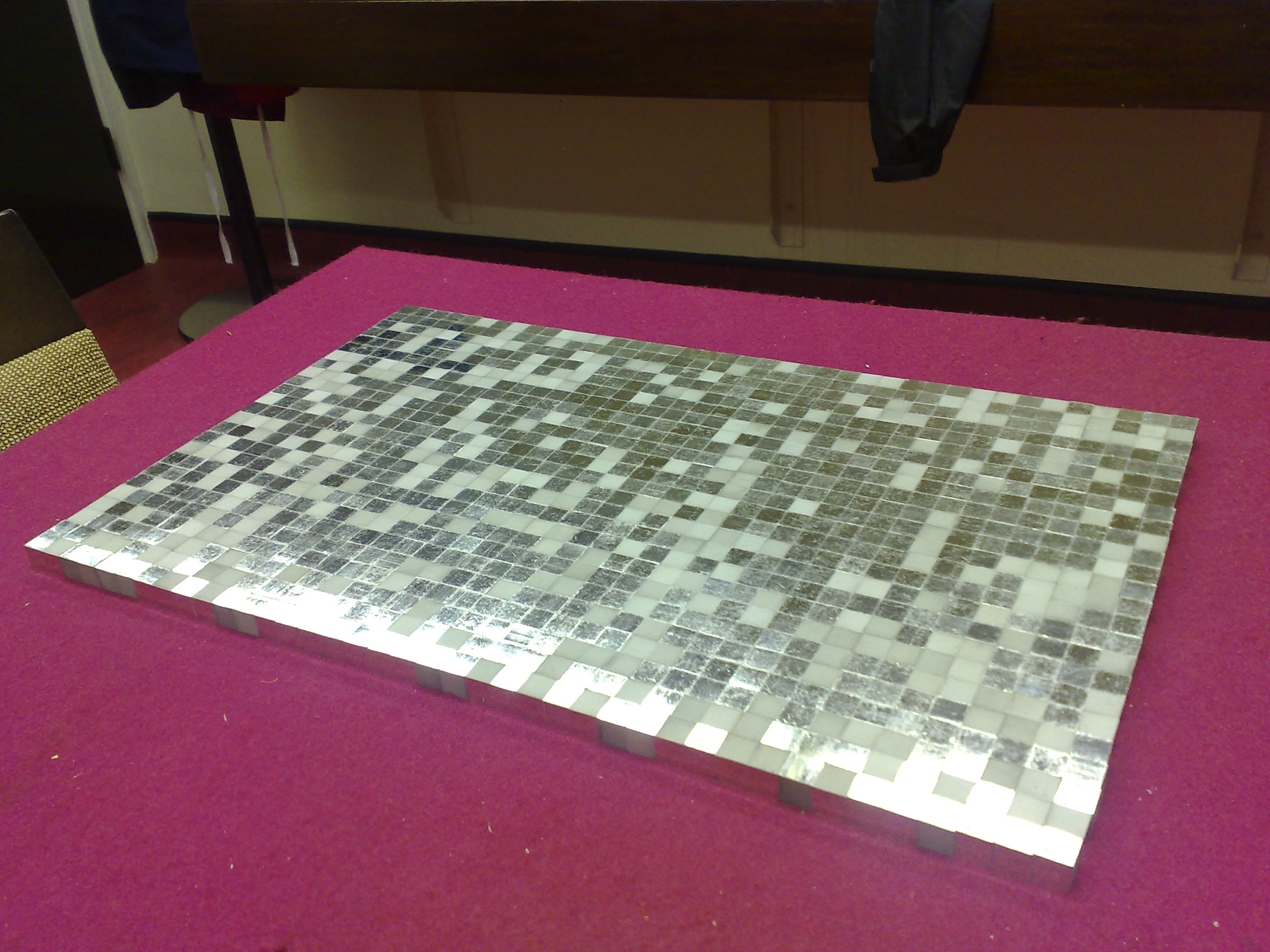
1,000 cubic centimeters (one liter) of 99.9% pure platinum, worth approx. US$910,000 at 30 October 2009 prices.

- A platinum credit card has a higher credit limit and a lower interest rate than a regular credit card, less prestigious than a Black Card. It is only available to someone with a good credit rating.

Literature

- In Isaac Asimov's Galactic Empire as depicted in his Foundation series, the monetary unit of the Galactic Empire, the galactic credit, is solidly backed because it is convertible to pure platinum—the Galactic Empire is on the platinum standard.

Marriage

- A married couple's 70th wedding anniversary is called their platinum anniversary. The 70th anniversary of any important event can be referred to as a platinum jubilee, although this term is rarely used.

Music

- A platinum album is an album whose sales figures have reached a certain amount. This threshold differs from market to market—in the United States, a platinum album is one that has sold at least 1,000,000 copies.
