= Structure of the United States Space Force =

Structure of the U.S. Space Force

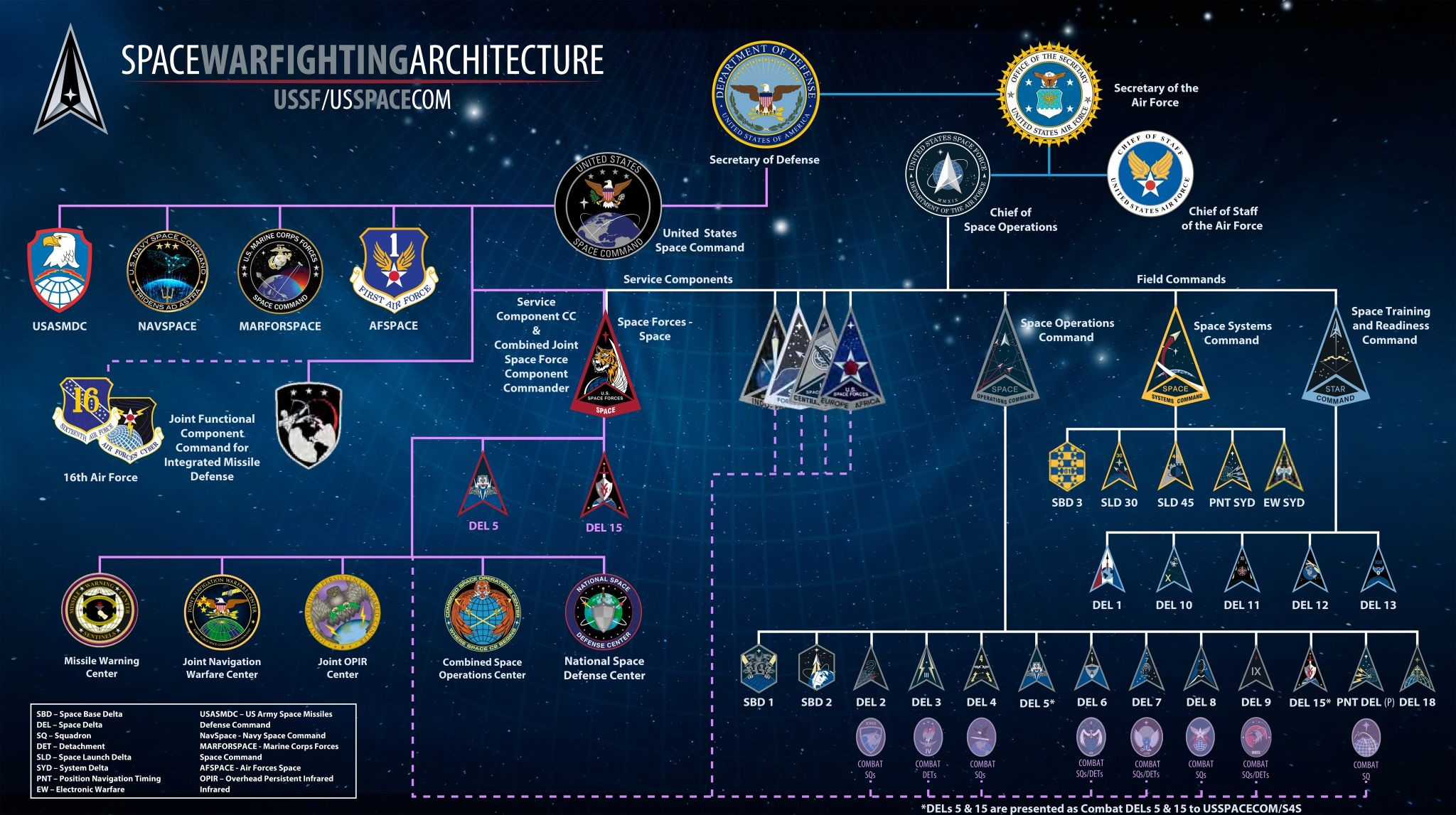

Organization of the United States Space Force within the Department of Defense

The United States Space Force includes the Space Staff, the field commands, space deltas, and squadrons.

The Space Force is organized as one of two coequal military service branches within the Department of the Air Force, the other being the United States Air Force. Both services are overseen by the Secretary of the Air Force, who has overall responsibility for organizing, training, and equipping the Air Force and Space Force.

The military head of the Space Force is the chief of space operations (CSO), who is an officer in the grade of general.

== Space Staff ==
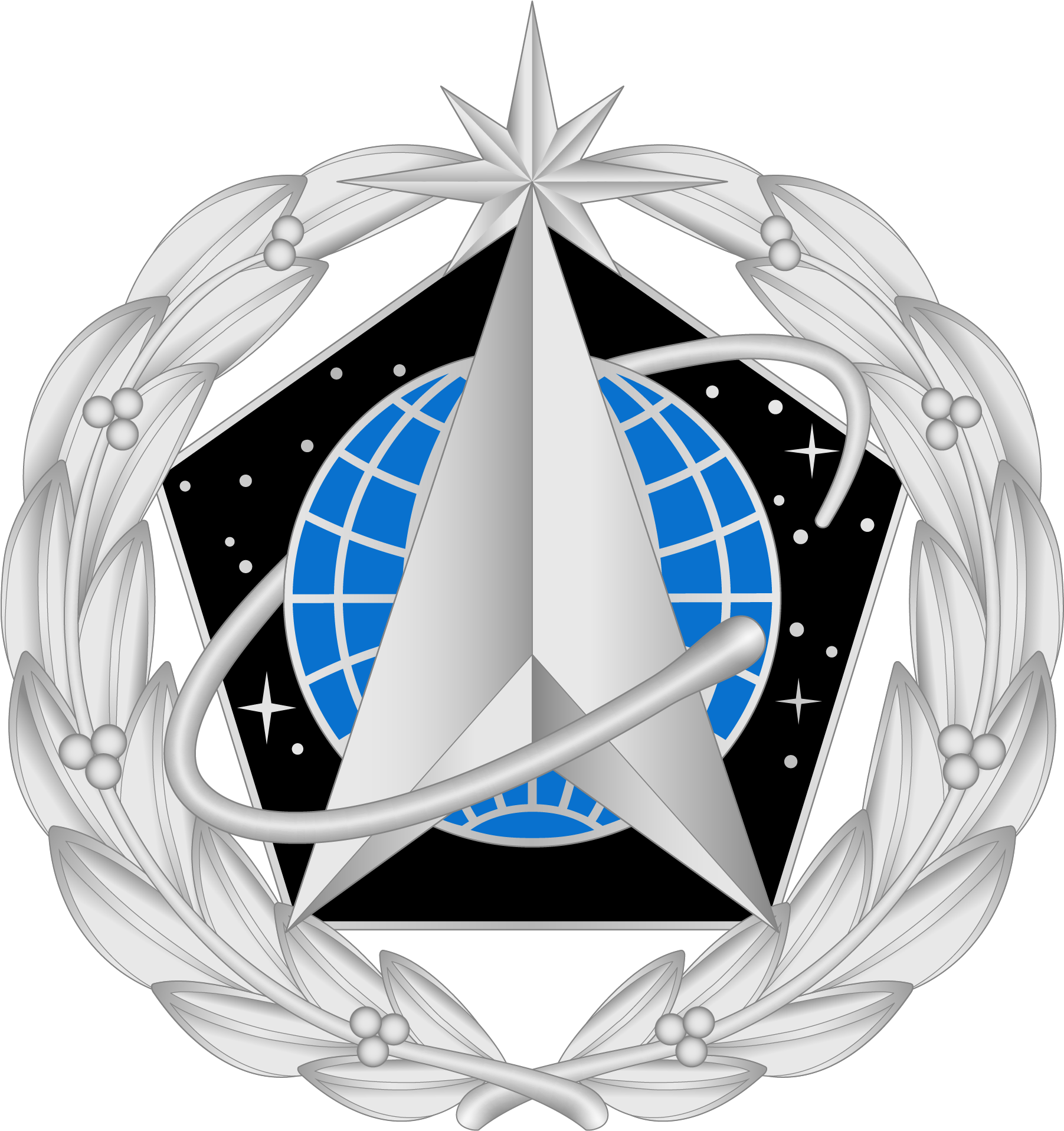
Space Staff Badge

The Space Staff is the headquarters of the U.S. Space Force. Like the U.S. Air Force's Air Staff that is under the Department of the Air Force, it is overseen by the Office of the Secretary of the Air Force. It is responsible for developing doctrine, guidance, and plans in performing the Space Force's functions, cooperating with the Air Staff on support issues. It is composed of the military service's most senior leaders: the chief of space operations, the vice chief of space operations, and the chief master sergeant of the Space Force. Like the other services, there is a director of staff who oversees the synchronization of policies and plans of the headquarters staff and four deputy chiefs of space operations. The Space Staff was designed to be lean. Compared to the Air Force's nine headquarters directorates, the Space Force merged nine functional areas into four directorates. Additionally, each of the four deputy chiefs of space operations has unofficial positional titles akin to that of corporate organizations: chief human capital officer, chief operations officer, chief technology and innovation officer, and chief strategy and resourcing officer. The chief human capital officer and chief technology and innovation officer positions are held by senior civilian officials at the SES-3 level, while both the chief operations officer and chief strategy and resourcing officer positions are filled by two lieutenant generals.

- Chief of Space Operations (CSO): Gen B. Chance Saltzman
  - Vice Chief of Space Operations (VCSO): Gen Shawn N. Bratton
    - Director of Staff: Brig Gen Shariful M. Khan, USAF
      - Deputy Director of Staff: Justin W. Phillips
    - DCSO for Personnel (S1): Katharine Kelley
      - Assistant DCSO for Personnel: Todd L. Remington
    - DCSO for Intelligence (S2): Maj Gen Brian D. Sidari
      - Assistant DCSO for Intelligence: Ed Mornston
    - DCSO for Operations (S3/4/7/10): Lt Gen Douglas Schiess
      - Assistant DCSO for Operations: Brig Gen Nick Hague
        - Associate DCSO for Operations:
      - Assistant DCSO for Installations and Logistics: Kathryn Kolbe
      - Mobilization Assistant to the DCSO: Col Nathan D. Yates, USAF
    - DCSO for Strategy, Plans, Programs, Requirements, and Analysis (S5/8): Lt Gen David N. Miller
      - Assistant DCSO for Strategy, Plans, Programs, Requirements, and Analysis: Jessica P. Powers
        - Director of Plans and Programs (S8): Brig Gen Christopher A. Fernengel
      - Mobilization Assistant to the DCSO: Brig Gen Damon S. Feltman, USAF
    - DCSO for Cyber and Data (S6): Charleen D. Laughlin
      - Assistant Cyber and Data: Col Nathan L. Iven
    - Associate DCSO for Future Concepts and Partnerships: AM Paul Godfrey, RAF
  - Mobilization Assistant to the CSO: Maj Gen Robert W. Claude, USAF
  - Chief Master Sergeant of the Space Force (CMSSF): CMSSF John F. Bentivegna

== Direct reporting units ==
Direct reporting unit	Headquarters	Director
Space Development Agency (SDA)	Washington, District of Columbia	Gurpartap Sandhoo
Space Rapid Capabilities Office (SpRCO)	Kirtland Air Force Base, New Mexico	Natahan Dalrymple (acting)

== Field organization ==
The Space Force field organization consist of three different echelons of command: field commands, deltas, and squadrons. General information about military units:

- a section consists of two or more guardians, this is also referred to as an "element" in basic training
- a flight comprises Individual guardians or sections
- two or more flights form a squadron (commanded by major or lieutenant colonel) — the lowest level of command, usually identified by number and function
- two or more squadrons form a delta (commanded by colonel); there are three types of deltas:
  - space delta support institutional functions. These Deltas are responsible for training, doctrine, tactics, wargames, lessons learned, range and aggressor activities, education, test and evaluation, and exercises
  - mission delta is responsible for an entire mission set for the service
  - space base delta is responsible for base support on Space Force bases
  - space launch delta is responsible for both base support and the launch mission for its Space Force base
  - system delta perform acquisition functions including research, development, and initial fielding of space capabilities
- field commands (commanded by major general or lieutenant general) are responsible for organizing, training and equipping thousands of guardians around the world; a field command is organized by mission, such as Space Training and Readiness Command, and reports directly to headquarters at the Pentagon
  - service component field commands (commanded by colonel or brigadier general) integrate Space Force capabilities with other service branches and combatant commands, serving as the bridge between the Space Force and the broader joint military structure; they are organized under the combatant command they support

=== Field Command ===
Field commands (FLDCOMs) align with specific mission focuses and are led by officers in the grade of lieutenant general or major general, comparable to the United States Air Force's major command. The Space Force's three field commands are Combat Forces Command (CFC), Space Systems Command (SSC), and Space Training and Readiness Command (STARCOM).

Field Command	Headquarters	Current commander
United States Space Force Combat Forces Command (CFC)	Peterson Space Force Base, Colorado	Lt Gen Gregory J. Gagnon
Space Systems Command (SSC)	Los Angeles Air Force Base, California	Lt Gen Philip A. Garrant
Space Training and Readiness Command (STARCOM)	Patrick Space Force Base, Florida	Maj Gen James E. Smith
Component Field Commands
United States Space Forces – Central (SPACEFOR-CENTRAL)	MacDill Air Force Base, Florida	Brig Gen Todd J. Benson
United States Space Forces – Indo-Pacific (SPACEFOR-INDOPAC)	Joint Base Pearl Harbor–Hickam, Hawaii	Brig Gen Brian A. Denaro
United States Space Forces – Japan (SPACEFOR-JAPAN)	Yokota Air Base, Japan	Col John D. Patrick
United States Space Forces – Korea (SPACEFOR-KOREA)	Osan Air Base, South Korea	Col Dorian C. Hatcher
United States Space Forces – Space (S4S)	Vandenberg Space Force Base, California	Lt Gen Dennis O. Bythewood
United States Space Forces Europe – Space Forces Africa (SPACEFOR-EURAF)	Ramstein Air Base, Germany	Brig Gen Christopher A. Fernengel
United States Space Forces – Northern (SPACEFOR-NORTH)	Peterson Space Force Base, Colorado	Brig Gen Phillip A. Verroco
United States Space Forces – Southern (SPACEFOR-SOUTH)	Davis-Monthan Air Force Base, Arizona	Col Brandon P. Alford
United States Space Forces – Special Operations Command (SPACEFOR-SOC)	MacDill Air Force Base, Florida	Col Peter Norsky
Space Force Elements
Space Force Element to the National Reconnaissance Office (SFELM NRO)	Chantilly, Virginia	Brig Gen Robert Schreiner

Denotes planned unit but not yet activated.

==== Combat Forces Command ====
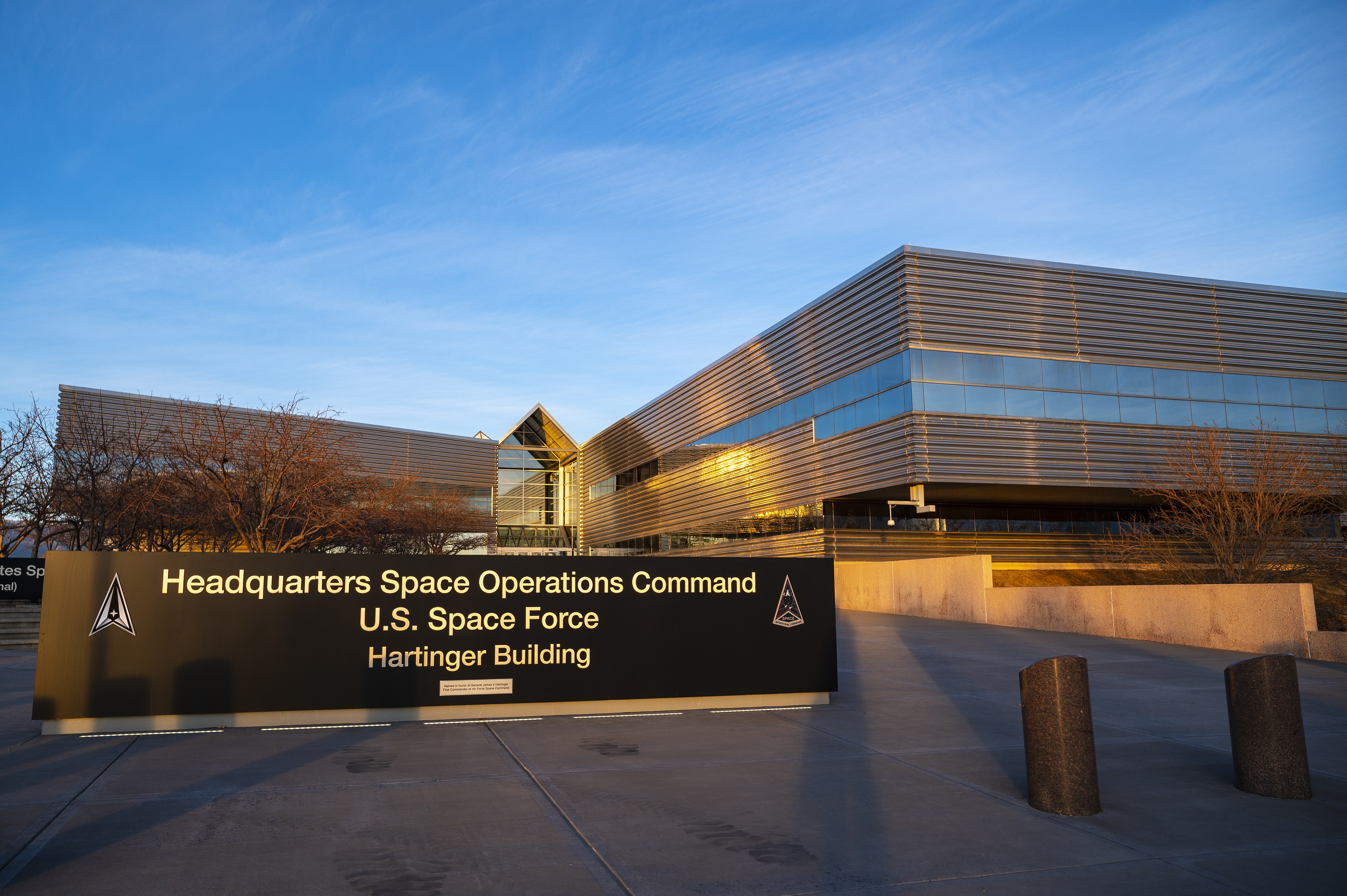
Hartinger Building, SpOC headquarters at Peterson Space Force Base, Colorado.

The Combat Forces Command (CFC) is the primary force provider of space forces and capabilities. It is responsible for the organization, training, equipping, command and control, and employment of space forces to support operational plans and missions for U.S. combatant commanders. It is headquartered at Peterson Space Force Base, Colorado.

Established on 21 October 2020, SpOC was the first field command activated. It was established by the redesignation of the headquarters of the former Air Force Space Command to Space Operations Command. It was composed of the 10 deltas and two garrisons activated on 24 July 2020. This included the Space Training and Readiness Delta (Provisional) which served as the interim unit for space training and education until the August 2021 stand-up of a full field command. SpOC also maintained command of the two launch wings, which were later redesignated as launch deltas in 2021, previously under the Air Force Space Command until the establishment of the Space Systems Command. It was redesignated as Combat Forces Command on November 3, 2025.

The 14th Air Force in Vandenberg Space Force Base, California that was temporarily redesignated Space Operations Command upon the creation of the Space Force was inactivated. A new unit, Space Operations Command West (SpOC West), was activated to serve as headquarters of the Combined Force Space Component Command (CFSCC), a subordinate command of the United States Space Command. The SpOC West commander also served as the commander of CFSCC and as the deputy commander of SpOC.

==== Space Systems Command ====
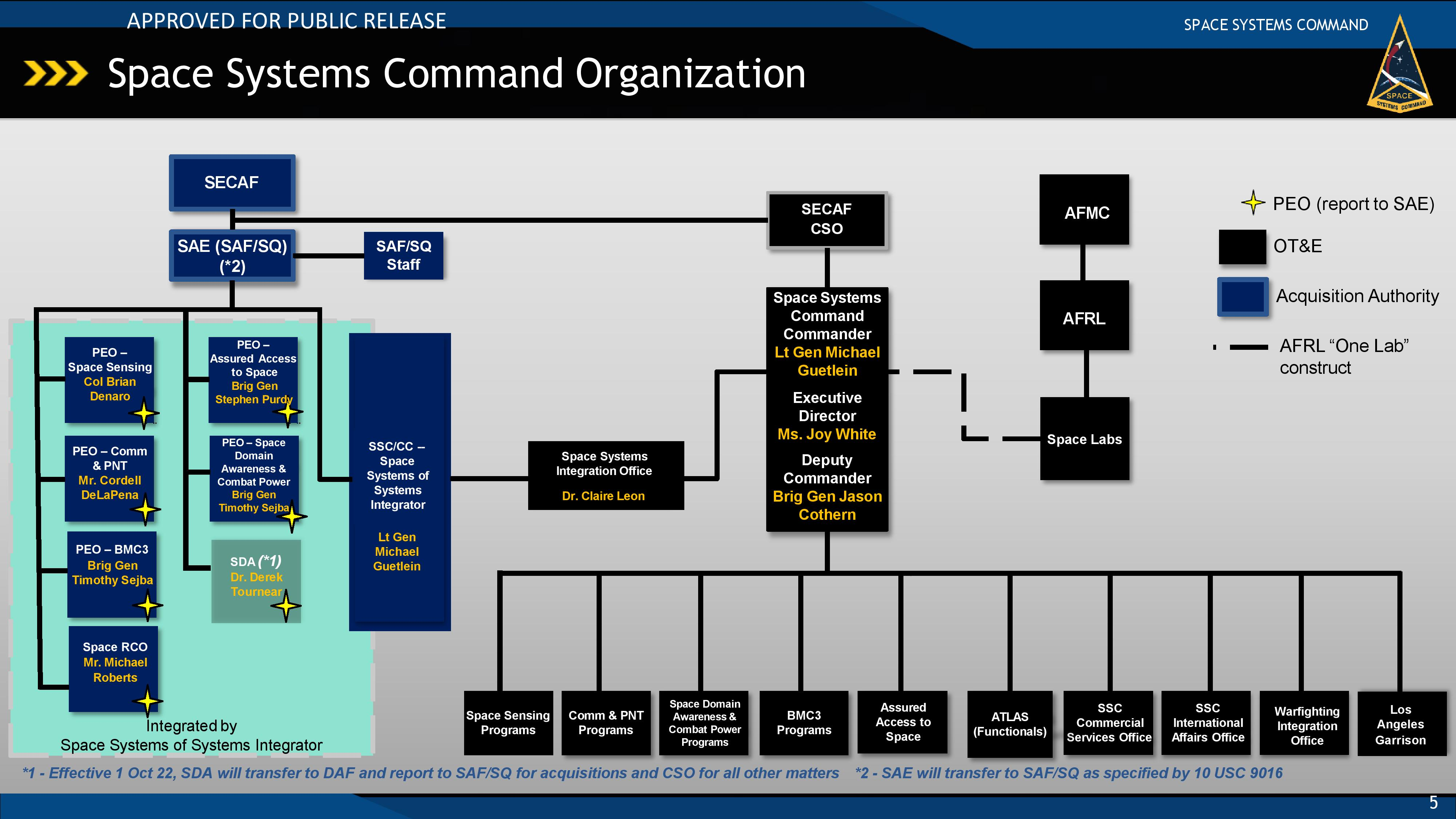
SSC organizational chart, 2022

The Space Systems Command (SSC) is becoming responsible for developing, acquiring, and fielding space systems, as well as launch, sustainment, and maintenance of space systems. It also advises Space Force science and technology activities.

The Space Force, on 8 April 2021, announced the planned structure of the SSC. Led by a lieutenant general, SSC was to be formed by redesignating the Space and Missile Systems Center, Commercial Satellite Communications Office, and other space systems programs offices transferred into the Space Force, being stood up in summer 2021. On July 29, Michael Guetlein was confirmed as its first commander by the United States Senate. The ceremony installing him in command of the new SSC was held August 13, 2021.

Under the new structure, the two launch deltas previously under SpOC were reassigned to SSC under the oversight of the SSC deputy commander. The commander of the Space Launch Delta 45 will take on additional duties as the field command's director of operations.

==== Space Training and Readiness Command ====
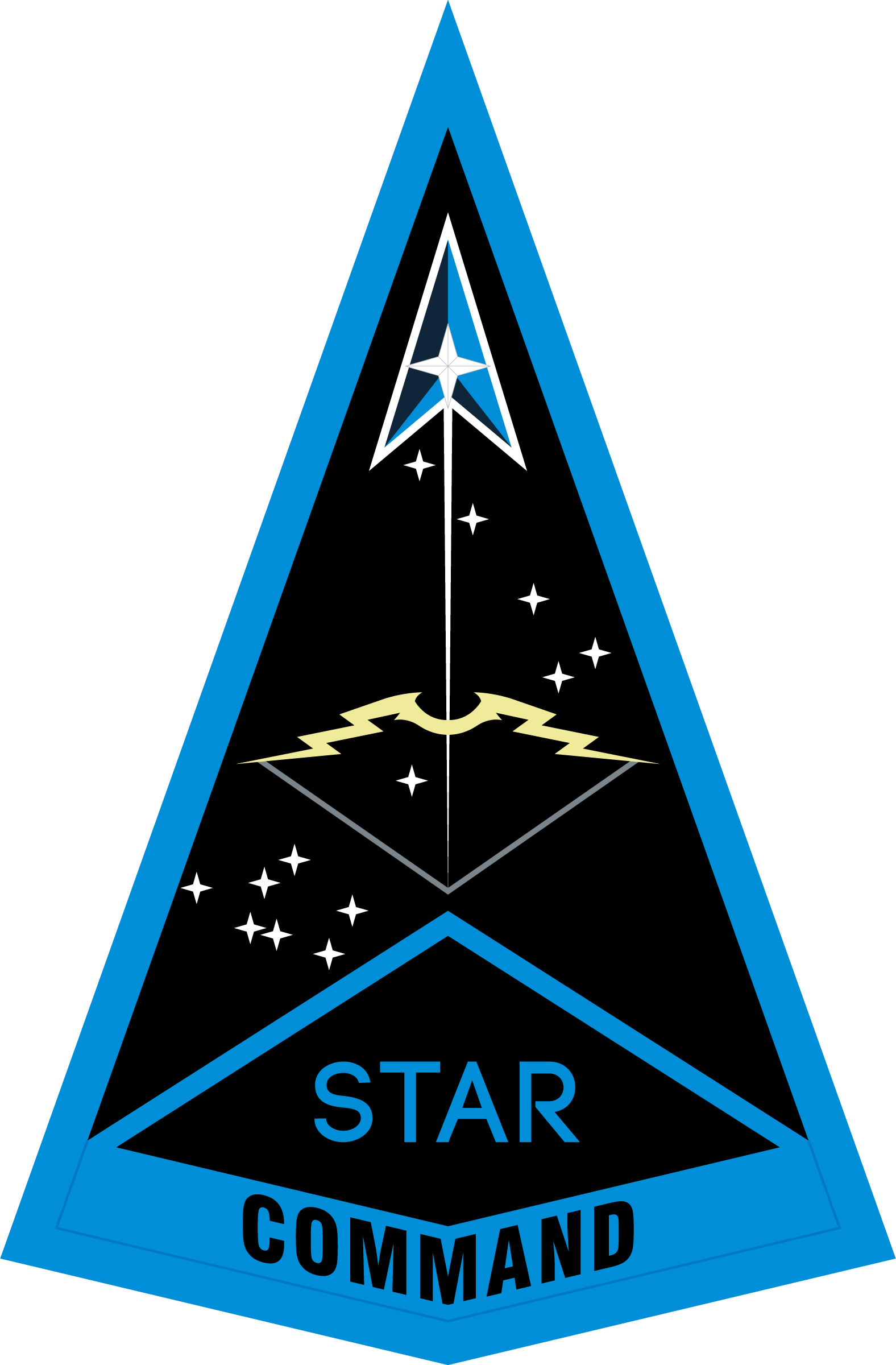
STARCOM emblem

The Space Training and Readiness Command was planned to train and educate space professionals, develop combat-ready space forces, and additionally taking on the roles of integrated testing and on-orbit checkout. Initially, before the activation of the command, a Space Training and Readiness Delta was established in July 2020 at Peterson SFB. STARCOM was activated on 23 August 2021, led by a major general. Five subordinate deltas then began being established: one each for training, doctrine and lessons learned, range and aggressor, test and evaluation, and education.

=== Delta ===
The Space Force has no command echelon equivalent of the U.S. Air Force′s numbered air forces, so the next command echelon below field commands is the delta, a single level of command which combines the wing and group command echelons found in the U.S. Air Force. Each delta is organized around a specific function, such as operations, installation support, or training, and is led by an officer in the grade of colonel. Space Deltas are operational organizations, but have no responsibility for base support, which is either the Air Force′s responsibility, or that of the Space Base Deltas, the former Garrisons.

The first 11 deltas in the Space Force initially were assigned to the Space Operations Command. Of those, two were realigned under the Space Systems Command, and the Space Training and Readiness Delta (Provisional) became a separate field command.

Delta	Headquarters	Current commander
Field Operating Agency
National Space Intelligence Center (NSIC)	Wright-Patterson Air Force Base, Ohio	Col Patrick Hamlin
USSF Combat Forces Command
Mission Delta 2 – Space Domain Awareness and Space Battle Management (MD 2)	Peterson Space Force Base, Colorado	Col Barry A. Croker
Mission Delta 3 – Space Electromagnetic Warfare (MD 3)	Peterson Space Force Base, Colorado	Col Angelo Fernandez
Mission Delta 4 – Missile Warning and Tracking (MD 4)	Buckley Space Force Base, Colorado	Col Brandon Davenport
Mission Delta 6 – Cyberspace Operations (MD 6)	Schriever Space Force Base, Colorado	Col Maxwell E. Fuldauer
Space Delta 7 – Intelligence, Surveillance, and Reconnaissance (DEL 7)	Peterson Space Force Base, Colorado	Col Nathaniel A. Peace
Mission Delta 8 – Satellite Communication (MD 8)	Schriever Space Force Base, Colorado	Col Kara Sartori
Mission Delta 9 – Orbital Warfare (MD 9)	Schriever Space Force Base, Colorado	Col Bryony Slaughter
Mission Delta 31 – Navigation Warfare and Space Control Network (MD 31)	Schriever Space Force Base, Colorado	Col Stephen A. Hobbs
Space Base Delta 1 (SBD 1)	Peterson Space Force Base, Colorado	Col Charles Cooper
Space Base Delta 2 (SBD 2)	Buckley Space Force Base, Colorado	Col Eamon R. Murray
Space Base Delta 41 (SBD 41)	Schriever Space Force Base, Colorado	Col Eric D. Bogue
Space Systems Command
Space Base Delta 3 (SBD 3)	Los Angeles Air Force Base, California	Col Steven Slagle
Space Systems Integration Office (SSC/BZ)
Portfolio Acquisition Executive - Space Access (SFPAE-SA)
Space Launch Delta 30 (SLD 30)	Vandenberg Space Force Base, California	Col James T. Horne III
Space Launch Delta 45 (SLD 45)	Patrick Space Force Base, Florida	Col Brian L. Chatman
System Delta 80 (SYD 80) Assured Access to Space	Patrick Space Force Base, Florida	Col Ryan M. Hiserote
Portfolio Acquisition Executive - Battle Management, Command, Control, Communications and Intelligence (SFPAE-BMC3I)
System Delta 85 (SYD 85) Integrated Space Domain Awareness	Peterson Space Force Base, Colorado	Col Jason E. West
Portfolio Acquisition Executive - Satellite Communications & Positioning, Navigation, and Timing (SFPAE-SATCOM&PNT)
System Delta 88 (SYD 88) Satellite Communications	Los Angeles Air Force Base, California	Col Ryan Rose
System Delta 831 (SYD 831) Positioning, Navigation and Timing	Los Angeles Air Force Base, California	Col Neil B. Barnas
Portfolio Acquisition Executive - Missile Warning and Tracking (SFPAE-MWT)
System Delta 84 (SYD 84) Space-Based Missile Warning and Tracking	Los Angeles Air Force Base, California	Col Kenneth J. Smith
Portfolio Acquisition Executive - Space-Based Sensing and Targeting (SFPAE-SBS&T)
System Delta 810 (SYD 810) Space-Based Sensing and Targeting	Los Angeles Air Force Base, California	Col Nathan P. Vosters
Portfolio Acquisition Executive - Space Combat Power (SFPAE-SCP)
System Delta 89 (SYD 89) Space Combat Power	Los Angeles Air Force Base, California	Col Brendan J. Hochstein
Portfolio Acquisition Executive - Infrastructure (SFPAE-I)
System Delta 81 (SYD 81) Operational Test and Training Infrastructure	Peterson Space Force Base, Colorado	Col Margaret Sullivan
Portfolio Acquisition Executive - Advanced Capabilities (SFPAE-AC)
Portfolio Acquisition Executive - Electromagnetic Warfare and Cyber (SFPAE-EWC)
Space Training and Readiness Command
Space Delta 1 – Training (DEL 1)	Vandenberg Space Force Base, California	Col Krista N. St Romain
Space Delta 10 – Doctrine and Wargaming (DEL 10)	Patrick Space Force Base, Florida	Col Leah Shubin
Space Delta 11 – Range and Aggressor (DEL 11)	Schriever Space Force Base, Colorado	Col Agustin Carrero
Space Delta 12 – Test and Evaluation (DEL 12)	Schriever Space Force Base, Colorado	Col Anna Gunn-Golkin
Space Delta 13 – Education (DEL 13)	Joint Base Andrews, Maryland	Dr. Thomas Griffy (acting)
U.S. Space Forces – Space
Space Delta 5 – Combined Space Operations Center (DEL 5)	Vandenberg Space Force Base, California	Col Samuel R. Oppelaar II
Space Delta 15 – National Space Defense Center (DEL 15)	Schriever Space Force Base, Colorado	Col Byron L. Bell
Space Force Element to the National Reconnaissance Office
Space Delta 20 – Aerospace Data Facility-Colorado (DEL 20)	Buckley Space Force Base, Colorado	Col Aaron Cochrane
Space Delta 21 – Aerospace Data Facility-East (DEL 21)	Fort Belvoir, Virginia	Col Nicholas Martin
Space Delta 23 – Aerospace Data Facility-Southwest (DEL 23)	White Sands Missile Range, New Mexico	Col Scott Munn
Space Delta 25 – National Reconnaissance Operations Center (DEL 25)	Chantilly, Virginia	Col William Sanders
Space Delta 26 – NRO Cyber (DEL 26)	Chantilly, Virginia	Col Erica Mitchell
Space Rapid Capabilities Office
Advanced Capabilities Acquisition Delta	Kirtland Air Force Base, New Mexico	Col Paul A. LaTour
Strategic Capabilities Acquisition Delta	Kirtland Air Force Base, New Mexico	Col Jeff Gallagher

Denotes planned unit but not yet activated.

=== Squadron ===
Below deltas in the Space Force structure are squadrons. Space Force squadrons are focused on specific tactics and are led by an officer in the grade of lieutenant colonel.

Squadron	Headquarters
National Space Intelligence Center (formerly Space Delta 18)
1st Intelligence Analysis Squadron (1 IAS)	Wright-Patterson Air Force Base, Ohio
2nd Intelligence Analysis Squadron (2 IAS)	Wright-Patterson Air Force Base, Ohio
3rd Intelligence Analysis Squadron (3 IAS)	Wright-Patterson Air Force Base, Ohio
4th Intelligence Analysis Squadron (4 IAS)	Wright-Patterson Air Force Base, Ohio
Space Delta 1
320th Recruiting Squadron (320 RCS)	Joint Base San Antonio, Texas
533rd Training Squadron (533 TRS)	Vandenberg Space Force Base, California
535th Training Squadron (535 TRS)	Joint Base San Antonio, Texas
537th Training Squadron (537 TRS)	Peterson Space Force Base, Colorado
Mission Delta 2
2nd Sustainment Squadron (2 STS)	Peterson Space Force Base, Colorado
15th Space Surveillance Squadron (18 SPSS)	Maui, Hawaii
18th Space Defense Squadron (18 SDS)	Vandenberg Space Force Base, California
19th Space Defense Squadron (19 SDS)	Naval Support Facility Dahlgren, Virginia
20th Space Surveillance Squadron (20 SPSS)	Eglin Air Force Base, Florida
62nd Cyberspace Squadron (62 CYS)	Peterson Space Force Base, Colorado
Mission Delta 3
1st Electromagnetic Warfare Squadron (1 EWS)	Peterson Space Force Base, Colorado
3rd Sustainment Squadron (3 STS)	Peterson Space Force Base, Colorado
4th Electromagnetic Warfare Squadron (4 EWS)	Peterson Space Force Base, Colorado
5th Electromagnetic Warfare Squadron (5 EWS)	Peterson Space Force Base, Colorado
16th Electromagnetic Warfare Squadron (16 EWS)	Peterson Space Force Base, Colorado
23rd Electromagnetic Warfare Squadron (23 EWS)	Peterson Space Force Base, Colorado
37th Tactical Intelligence Squadron (37 TIS)	Peterson Space Force Base, Colorado
76th Electromagnetic Warfare Squadron (76 EWS)	Peterson Space Force Base, Colorado
Mission Delta 4
2nd Space Warning Squadron (2 SWS)	Buckley Space Force Base, Colorado
3rd Satellite Communications Squadron (3 SCS)	Buckley Space Force Base, Colorado
4th Sustainment Squadron (4 STS)	Buckley Space Force Base, Colorado
5th Space Warning Squadron (5 SWS)	Buckley Space Force Base, Colorado
6th Space Warning Squadron (6 SWS)	Cape Cod Space Force Station, Massachusetts
7th Space Warning Squadron (7 SWS)	Beale Air Force Base, California
10th Space Warning Squadron (10 SWS)	Cavalier Space Force Station, North Dakota
11th Space Warning Squadron (11 SWS)	Buckley Space Force Base, Colorado
12th Space Warning Squadron (12 SWS)	Pituffik Space Base, Greenland
13th Space Warning Squadron (13 SWS)	Clear Space Force Station, Alaska
47th Tactical Intelligence Squadron (47 TIS)	Buckley Space Force Base, Colorado
64th Cyberspace Squadron (64 CYS)	Buckley Space Force Base, Colorado
Space Delta 5
Joint Fires and Information Operations Team (JFIOT)	Vandenberg Space Force Base, California
Mission Delta 6
6th Sustainment Squadron (6 STS)	Schriever Space Force Base, Colorado
66th Cyberspace Squadron (66 CYS)	Schriever Space Force Base, Colorado
Space Delta 7
72nd Intelligence, Surveillance, and Reconnaissance Squadron (72 ISRS)	Peterson Space Force Base, Colorado
73rd Intelligence, Surveillance, and Reconnaissance Squadron (73 ISRS)	Wright-Patterson Air Force Base, Ohio
74th Intelligence, Surveillance, and Reconnaissance Squadron (74 ISRS)	Schriever Space Force Base, Colorado
75th Intelligence, Surveillance, and Reconnaissance Squadron (75 ISRS)	Peterson Space Force Base, Colorado
76th Intelligence, Surveillance, and Reconnaissance Squadron (76 ISRS)	Wright-Patterson Air Force Base, Ohio
77th Surveillance Squadron (77 SURS)	Grand Forks Air Force Base, North Dakota
Mission Delta 8
4th Space Operations Squadron (4 SOPS)	Schriever Space Force Base, Colorado
8th Sustainment Squadron (8 STS)	Schriever Space Force Base, Colorado
10th Space Operations Squadron (10 SOPS)	Point Mugu, California
53rd Space Operations Squadron (53 SOPS)	Peterson Space Force Base, Colorado
68th Cyberspace Squadron (68 CYS)	Schriever Space Force Base, Colorado
Mission Delta 9
1st Space Operations Squadron (1 SOPS)	Schriever Space Force Base, Colorado
3rd Space Operations Squadron (3 SOPS)	Schriever Space Force Base, Colorado
5th Space Operations Squadron (5 SOPS)	Joint Base Anacostia-Bolling, District of Columbia
9th Sustainment Squadron (9 STS)	Schriever Space Force Base, Colorado
69th Cyberspace Squadron (69 CYS)	Schriever Space Force Base, Colorado
97th Tactical Intelligence Squadron (97 TIS)	Schriever Space Force Base, Colorado
Space Delta 10
10th Delta Operations Squadron (10 DOS)	United States Air Force Academy, Colorado
10th Force Development Squadron (10 FDS)	United States Air Force Academy, Colorado
Space Delta 11
25th Space Range Squadron (25 SRS)	Schriever Space Force Base, Colorado
33rd Range Squadron (33 RGS)	Schriever Space Force Base, Colorado
55th Training Squadron (55 TRS)	Vandenberg Space Force Base, California
57th Space Aggressor Squadron (57 SAS)	Schriever Space Force Base, Colorado
98th Space Range Squadron (98 SRS)	Schriever Space Force Base, Colorado
328th Weapons Squadron (328 WPS)	Nellis Air Force Base, Nevada
392nd Combat Training Squadron (392 CTS)	Schriever Space Force Base, Colorado
527th Space Aggressor Squadron (527 SAS)	Schriever Space Force Base, Colorado
Space Delta 12
1st Test and Evaluation Squadron (1 TES)	Schriever Space Force Base, Colorado
3rd Test and Evaluation Squadron (3 TES)	Schriever Space Force Base, Colorado
4th Test and Evaluation Squadron (4 TES)	Peterson Space Force Base, Colorado
12th Delta Operations Squadron (12 DOS)	Schriever Space Force Base, Colorado
17th Test and Evaluation Squadron (17 TES)	Schriever Space Force Base, Colorado
593rd Test and Evaluation Squadron (593 TES)	Edwards Air Force Base, California
Space Delta 13
13th Delta Operations Squadron (13 DOS)	Maxwell Air Force Base, Alabama
National Security Space Institute (NSSI)	Peterson Space Force Base, Colorado
Squadron Officer School (SOS)	Maxwell Air Force Base, Alabama
Forrest L. Vosler Noncommissioned Officer Academy (Vossler NCOA)	Peterson Space Force Base, Colorado
Space Delta 15
15th Command and Control Squadron (15 CACS)	Schriever Space Force Base, Colorado
15th Cyberspace Squadron (15 CYS)	Schriever Space Force Base, Colorado
15th Intelligence, Surveillance and Reconnaissance Squadron (15 ISRS)	Schriever Space Force Base, Colorado
Mission Delta 31
2nd Navigation Warfare Squadron (2 NWS)	Schriever Space Force Base, Colorado
22nd Space Operations Squadron (22 SOPS)	Schriever Space Force Base, Colorado
31st Capability Development Squadron (31 CDS)	Los Angeles Air Force Base, California
31st Sustainment Squadron (31 STS)	Peterson Space Force Base, Colorado
631st Cyberspace Squadron (631 CYS)	Schriever Space Force Base, Colorado
Space Force Element to the National Reconnaissance Office
NRO Operations Squadron (NOPS)	Schriever Space Force Base, Colorado
Space Delta 20
201st Space Operations Squadron (201 SOPS)	Buckley Space Force Base, Colorado
207th Space Operations Squadron (207 SOPS)	Buckley Space Force Base, Colorado
264th Cyber Operations Squadron (264 CYS)	Buckley Space Force Base, Colorado
Space Delta 21
Space Operations Squadron (ADF-E SOPS)	Fort Belvoir, Virginia
260th Enterprise Operations Squadron (260 EOS)	Fort Belvoir, Virginia
Space Delta 23
Space Operations Squadron (ADF-SW SOPS)	White Sands Missile Range, New Mexico
Space Delta 26
660th Network Operations Squadron (660 NOS)	Fort Belvoir, Virginia
661st Cyber Operations Squadron (661 CYS)	Fort Belvoir, Virginia
662nd Cyber Operations Squadron (662 CYS)	Fort Belvoir, Virginia
663rd Cyber Operations Squadron (663 CYS)	Buckley Space Force Base, Colorado
664th Cyber Operations Squadron (664 CYS)	Cape Canaveral Space Force Station, Florida
Space Launch Delta 30
2nd Range Operations Squadron (2 ROPS)	Vandenberg Space Force Base, California
2nd Space Launch Squadron (2 SLS)	Vandenberg Space Force Base, California
4th Space Launch Squadron (4 SLS)	Vandenberg Space Force Base, California
30th Operations Support Squadron (30 OSS)	Vandenberg Space Force Base, California
630th Cyberspace Squadron (630 CYS)	Vandenberg Space Force Base, California
Space Launch Delta 45
1st Range Operations Squadron (1 ROPS)	Patrick Space Force Base, Florida
1st Space Launch Squadron (1 SLS)	Patrick Space Force Base, Florida
5th Space Launch Squadron (5 SLS)	Patrick Space Force Base, Florida
45th Weather Squadron (45 WS)	Patrick Space Force Base, Florida
645th Cyberspace Squadron (645 CYS)	Patrick Space Force Base, Florida
Space Base Delta 1
21st Communications Squadron (21 CS)	Peterson Space Force Base, Colorado
Space Base Delta 3
61st Communications Squadron (61 CS)	Los Angeles Air Force Base, California

== History ==
On 20 December 2019, Air Force Space Command's principal components were 14th Air Force (Air Forces Strategic) and the Space and Missile Systems Center. At the same time as the creation of the Space Force 14th Air Force was redesignated as Space Operations Command.

On 12 March 2019, the Space Development Agency (SDA), a new space-focused development agency, additional to the Space and Missile Systems Center and the Space Rapid Capabilities Office, was established. It was established under the authority of the under secretary of defense for research and engineering. As of January 2020, the SDA is planned to become part of the U.S. Space Force in October 2022.

In early April 2020, a list of twenty-three units to be transferred from the Air Force to the Space Force was publicly reported. Those units included the 17th Test Squadron, Peterson Space Force Base, Colorado; 18th Intelligence Squadron, Wright-Patterson AFB, OH; the 25th Space Range Squadron, Schriever AFB, CO; the 328th Weapons Squadron, Nellis AFB, NV; the 527th Space Aggressor Squadron, Schriever AFB, CO; the 7th Intelligence Squadron, 659th Intelligence, Surveillance and Reconnaissance Group, 70th ISR Wing, Ft. Meade, Maryland*; Sixteenth Air Force/Advanced Programs*, Schriever AFB, Colorado; the 32nd Intelligence Squadron, Ft. Meade, Maryland*; the 566th Intelligence Squadron, Buckley AFB, Colorado*; the 544th Intelligence, Surveillance and Reconnaissance Group, Group Staff & Detachment 5, Peterson AFB, Colorado; D the 533d Training Squadron, 381st Training Group, Vandenberg AFB, CA (initial training); the Air Force Research Laboratory (AFRL) Research Lab Mission Execution, Wright-Patterson AFB, Ohio*; the AFRL Space Vehicles Directorate, Kirtland AFB, New Mexico*; the AFRL Rocket Propulsion Division, Edwards AFB, CA; the AFRL Electro-Optical Division, Maui, Hawaii & Kirtland AFB, New Mexico*; the AFRL Sensors Directorate, Wright-Patterson AFB, Ohio*; the Counter-Space Analysis Squadron and the Space Analysis Squadron, collectively half of the Space and Missiles Analysis Group, National Air and Space Intelligence Center, both at Wright-Patterson AFB; the Air Force Operational Test and Evaluation Center Detachment 4, Peterson AFB, CO; and the Air Force Safety Center – Space Safety Division, Kirtland AFB, New Mexico.

Detachment 1, USAF Warfare Center, Schriever AFB, Colorado; Operating Location A, 705th Combat Training Squadron, Schriever AFB, Colorado (ultimately part of the 505th Command and Control Wing), and the National Security Space Institute, Peterson AFB, CO National Security Space Institute, a place for space education became eventually part of the STAR Delta.

In September 2021 it was announced the 53rd Signal Battalion, the U.S. Army Satellite Operations Brigade, and the Naval Satellite Operations Center would be transferred to Space Force.

== Heraldry ==
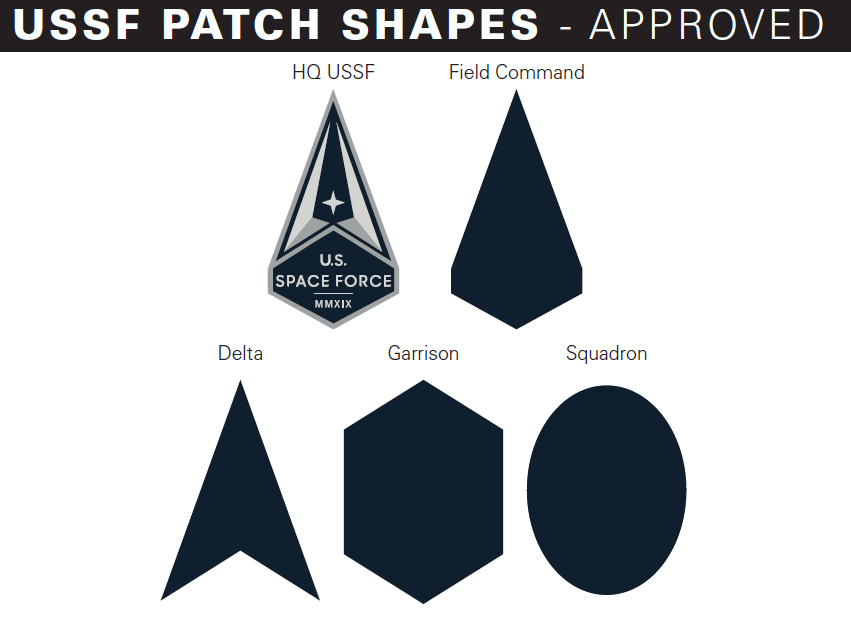
U.S. Space Force patch shapes, 2021

Each unit in the Space Force has an emblem in a shape depending on the unit type. Each of the three field commands also have a distinctive color: Silver Grey for CFC, Golden yellow for SSC, and Bluebird (Replacing initial Cannes Blue color) for STARCOM. Units assigned to Space Forces Space (a component field command) will use Brick Red as a distinctive color. Unit emblems are trimmed with the color of the field command to which they report. Space Force personnel assigned to National Reconnaissance Office roles will wear insignia trimmed in Black.

Unit	CFC (Silver gray)	SSC (Golden yellow)	STARCOM (Bluebird)	NRO (Black)	S4S (Old Glory red)
Field Command					
Delta					
Base Delta (hexagon)			—N/a	—N/a	—N/a
Squadron/Detachment (ellipse)					

== See also ==
- Structure of the United States Army
- Organization of the United States Marine Corps
- Structure of the United States Navy
- Structure of the United States Air Force
