= Space Delta 11 =

U.S. Space Force range and aggressor unit

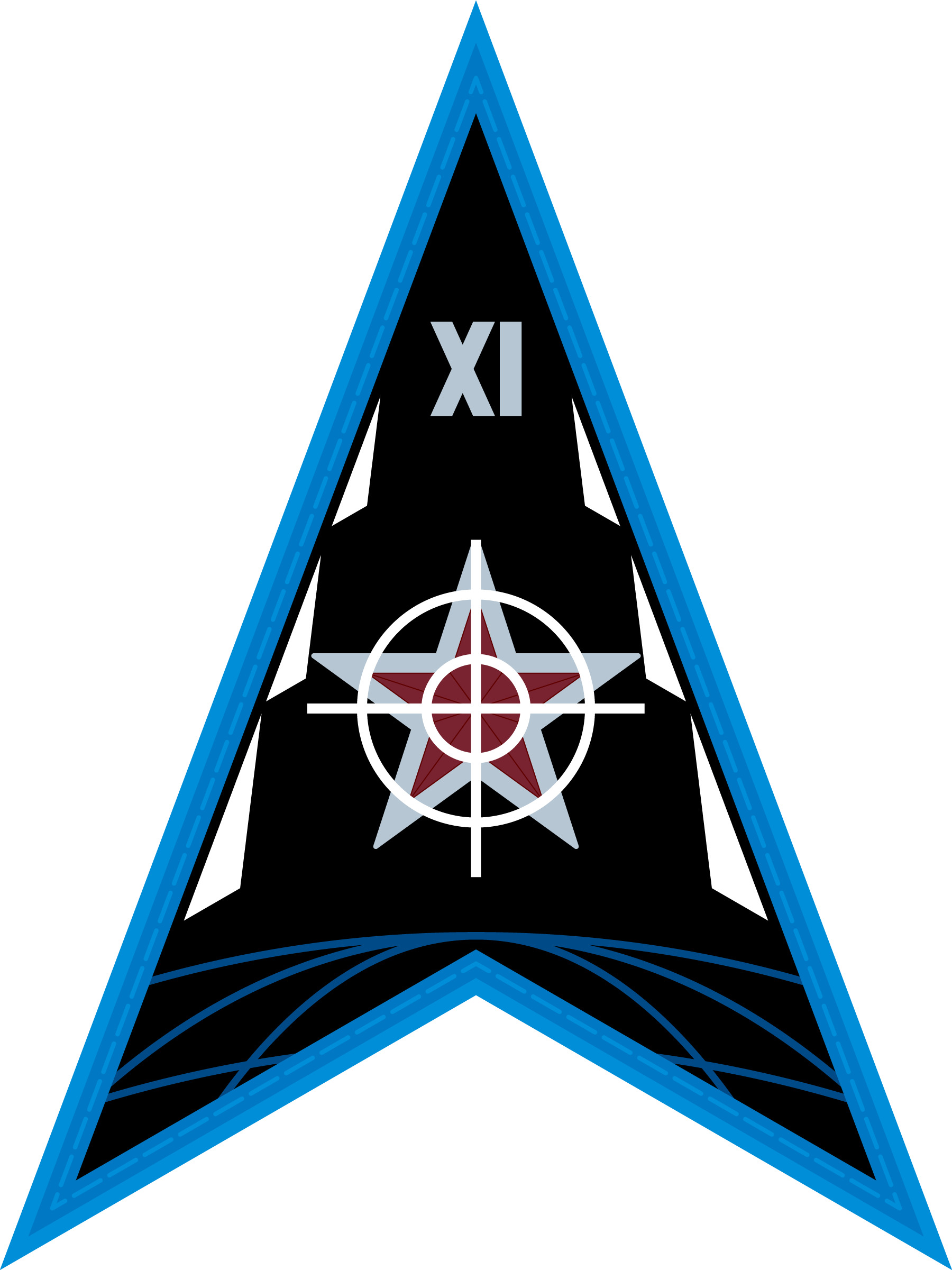
- Delta emblem
- Founded: 23 August 2021; 4 years ago
- Country: United States
- Branch: United States Space Force
- Type: Delta
- Role: Space range and aggressor
- Size: 500 personnel
- Part of: Space Training and Readiness Command
- Headquarters: Schriever Space Force Base, Colorado
- Website: Official website

Commanders
- Commander: Col Agustin Carrero
- Deputy Commander: Mr Joseph White
- Senior Enlisted Leader: CMSgt Heather Valenti

Insignia
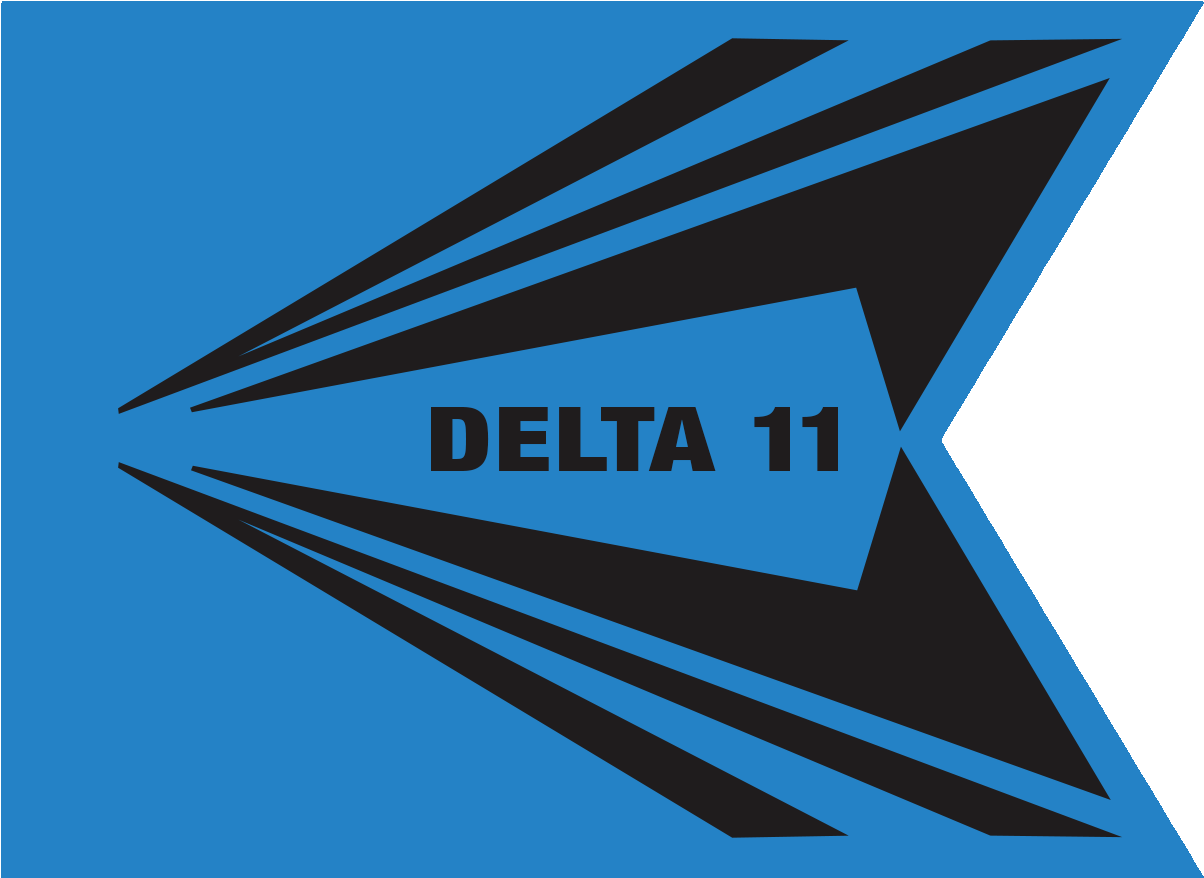
- SPACE DELTA 11 GUIDON

Space Delta 11 (DEL 11) is a United States Space Force unit responsible for space range and aggressor. It conducts live and virtual training and operations for test and training requirements. It was established on 23 August, 2021 following the establishment of the Space Training and Readiness Command (STARCOM), the field command to which it reports. It is temporarily headquartered at Schriever Space Force Base, Colorado. Its final location requires a base selection process and the Department of the Air Force's preferred option is Kirtland Air Force Base, New Mexico.

A ceremony was held on 30 August 2021 to recognize the delta's activation.

== Structure ==
DEL 11 is one of five deltas that reports to the Space Training and Readiness Command. It is composed of six subordinate units, three that were transferred from the United States Air Force and three that were created after the activation STARCOM.

Squadron	Function	Headquarters
11th Delta Operations Squadron	Delta staff	Schriever Space Force Base, Colorado
25th Space Range Squadron	Electromagnetic Spectrum Operations Range	Schriever Space Force Base, Colorado
33rd Range and Aggressor Squadron	Cyber Range and Aggressors	Schriever Space Force Base, Colorado
98th Space Range Squadron	Orbital Warfare Range	Schriever Space Force Base, Colorado
57th Space Aggressor Squadron	Orbital Warfare Aggressor squadron	Schriever Space Force Base, Colorado
55th Training Squadron	Training squadron	Vandenberg Space Force Base, California
328th Weapons Squadron	Space Force Weapons School	Nellis Air Force Base, Nevada
392nd Combat Training Squadron	Training squadron	Schriever Space Force Base, Colorado
527th Space Aggressor Squadron	Electromagnetic Warfare Aggressor squadron	Schriever Space Force Base, Colorado

== List of commanders ==
No.	Commander		Term			Ref
No.	Portrait	Name	Took office	Left office	Term length	Ref
1	Kyle J. Pumroy	Colonel; Kyle J. Pumroy	23 August 2021	7 July 2023	1 year, 318 days	
2	Jay M. Steingold	Colonel; Jay M. Steingold	7 July 2023	10 June 2025	1 year, 338 days	
3	Agustin Carrero	Colonel; Agustin Carrero	10 June 2025	Incumbent	1 year, 38 days	
