= United States Space Forces Special Operations Command =

- SPACEFOR-SOC emblem
- Founded: 7 October 2026; 1 months
- Country: United States
- Branch: United States Space Force
- Type: Component field command
- Role: Special operations
- Part of: United States Special Operations Command
- Headquarters: MacDill Air Force Base, Florida

Commanders
- Commander: Col Peter Norsky
- Command Senior Enlisted Leader: CMSgt Charles Apodaca

The United States Space Forces Special Operations Command (USSPACEFOR-SOC) is the United States Space Force component field command to United States Special Operations Command. It generates, prepares, and presents specialized Space Force personnel and force packages to U.S. Special Operations Command to integrate space capabilities into special operations. It was activated on 7 October 2026.

== Mission ==
Space Forces Special Operations Command (SPACEFOR-SOC) generates, prepares, and presentes specialized space personnel and force packages to U.S. Special Operations Command. It adapts Space Force expertise, training, personnel, and capabilities to meet the unique demands of special operations. The command has the mission of

- Organizing, training, equipping, developing, sustaining, and presenting specialized space forces;
- Integrating space capabilities into special operations planning, operations, and mission analysis
- Providing planners, advisors, liaison officers, intelligence personnel, enablers, and specialized teams.

It also is responsible for Special Operations Forces (SOF) Guardians and Space Special Warfare operators. SOF Guardians are who are Space Force personal assigned to a Special Operations organization in support of SOF responsibilities, while Space Special Warfare operators are the deliberately assessed, selected, trained, qualified, and mission-certified subset prepared for designated operational employment.

== History ==
527th Space Aggressor Squadron Guardians During Emerald Warrior 2024

After the U.S. Space Force separated from the U.S. Air Force, it established the U.S. Space Force Special Operations Element (USSFSOE) to conduct space coordination and support for United States Special Operations Command. In 2024, the Space Force Special Operations Element integrated the 527th Space Aggressor Squadron into the Air Force Special Operations Command's 2024 Emerald Warrior exercise, replicated satellite communication and GPS-based electromagnetic interference. The Space Force Special Operations Element also partnered with Space Systems Command for the Tactical Surveillance, Reconnaissance and Tracking Program.

The U.S. Space Force and U.S. Special Operations Command announced their intent to establish a full Space Force special operations command in 2025, normalizing the presentation of space forces and providing clarity of command relationships, roles, and responsibilities.

== List of commanders ==
No.	Commander		Term			Ref
No.	Portrait	Name	Took office	Left office	Duration	Ref
1	Peter Norsky	Colonel; Peter Norsky (born c. 1980)	7 October 2026	Incumbent	38 days	

== See also ==
- Air Force Special Operations Command
