= Space Delta 10 =

U.S. Space Force doctrine and wargaming unit

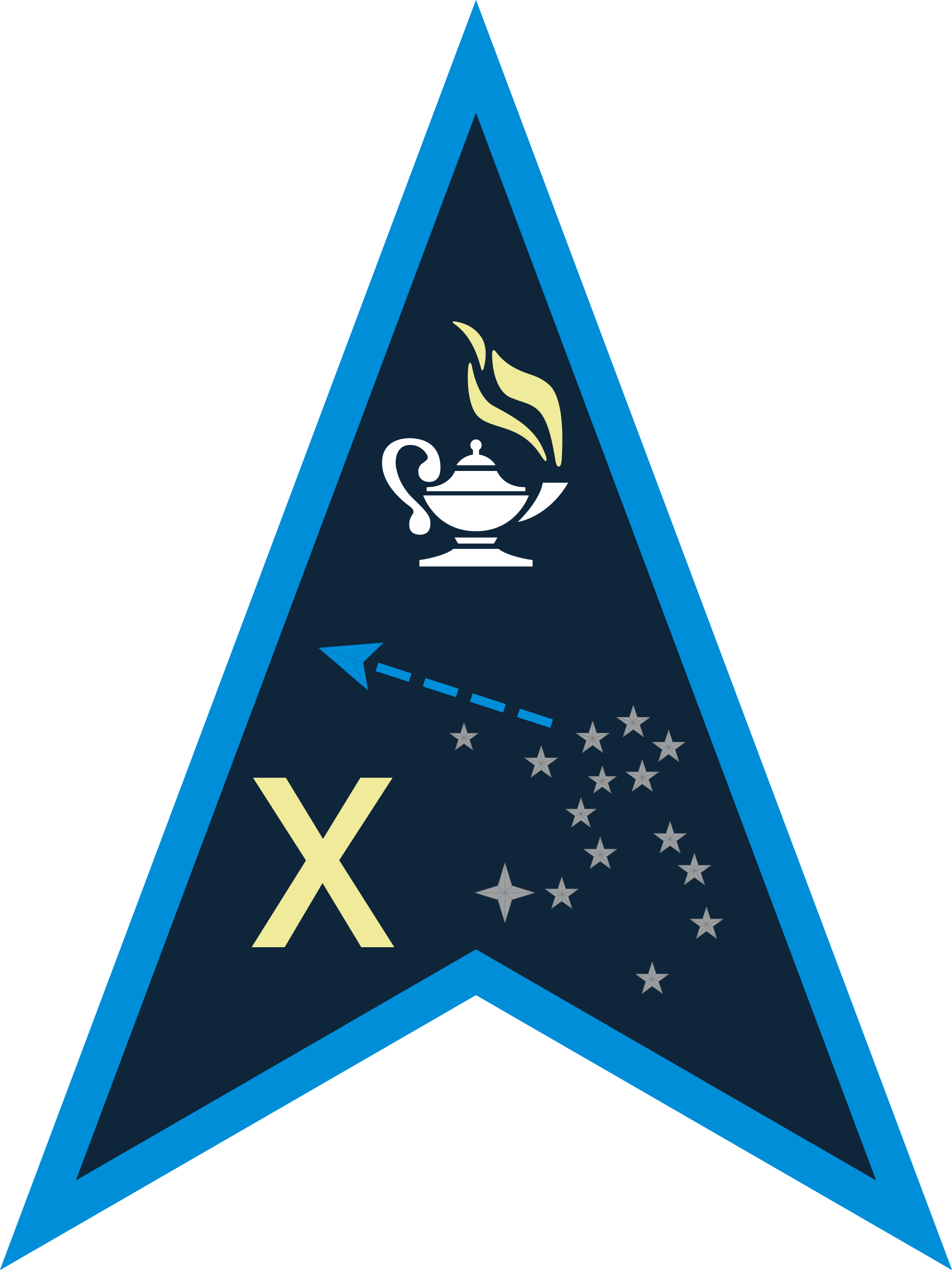
- Delta emblem
- Founded: 23 August 2021; 5 years ago
- Country: United States
- Branch: United States Space Force
- Type: Delta
- Role: Space doctrine and wargaming
- Part of: Space Training and Readiness Command
- Headquarters: Patrick Space Force Base, Florida
- Website: Official website

Commanders
- Commander: Col Leah C. Shubin
- Deputy Commander: Brian Raymond
- Senior Enlisted Leader: CMSgt Ryan Brown

Insignia
- Guidon

Space Delta 10 (DEL 10) is a United States Space Force (USSF) unit responsible for space doctrine, wargaming, and lessons learned. It was established on 23 August 2021 following the establishment of the Space Training and Readiness Command (STARCOM), the USSF field command to which it reports. It was initially headquartered at the United States Air Force Academy, Colorado pending a base selection process. It is currently located in interim facilities at Patrick Space Force Base and Cape Canaveral Space Force Station, Florida

== History ==
A ceremony was held on 30 September 2021 to recognize the delta's activation and the activation of the 10th Delta Operations Squadron. In June 2023, as part of the previously referenced base selection process, it was announced that the preferred location for DEL 10 was Patrick Space Force Base, Florida. On 7 August 2024, DEL 10 transferred to Patrick Space Force Base as a tenant command.

== Structure ==
DEL 10 is one of five deltas that reports to STARCOM. It will eventually be composed of four subordinate units following addition of the 10th Doctrine and Tactics Squadron and 10th Wargaming Squadron.

Emblem	Name	Function	Headquarters
Squadrons
	10th Delta Operations Squadron	Delta Operations Support	United States Air Force Academy, Colorado
	10th Force Development Squadron	Doctrine, tactics, and concepts	United States Air Force Academy, Colorado
Operating locations
	Operating Location - B	Wargames	Schriever Space Force Base, Colorado
	Operating Location - C	Lessons Learned	United States Air Force Academy, Colorado

== List of commanders ==
No.	Commander		Term			Ref
No.	Portrait	Name	Took office	Left office	Term length	Ref
1	Jack D. Fulmer II	Colonel; Jack D. Fulmer II	23 August 2021	7 August 2024	2 years, 350 days	
2	S. Shannon DaSilva	Colonel; S. Shannon DaSilva	7 August 2024	17 July 2026	1 year, 344 days	
3	Leah C. Shubin	Colonel; Leah C. Shubin	17 July 2026	Incumbent	122 days	
