= 11th Delta Operations Squadron =

U.S. Space Force unit

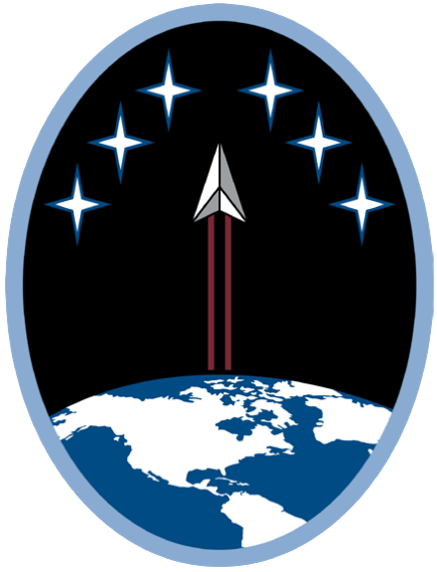
- 11 DOS emblem
- Active: 15 September 2021–present
- Country: United States
- Branch: United States Space Force
- Type: Squadron
- Role: Operations support
- Part of: Space Delta 11
- Headquarters: Schriever Space Force Base, Colorado, U.S.

Commanders
- Commander: Lt Col Emerson L. Drain
- Director of Operations: Maj Danielle Ryan
- Superintendent: SMSgt Jen Rider

The 11th Delta Operations Squadron (11 DOS) is a United States Space Force unit. Assigned to Space Training and Readiness Command's Space Delta 11, it is responsible for providing operations support to the delta. It was activated on 15 September 2021.

== List of commanders ==
- Lt Col Justin C. Fernandez, 15 September 2021 – 30 June 2023
- Lt Col Emerson L. Drain, 30 June 2023 – present

== See also ==
- Space Delta 11
