= System Delta 810 =

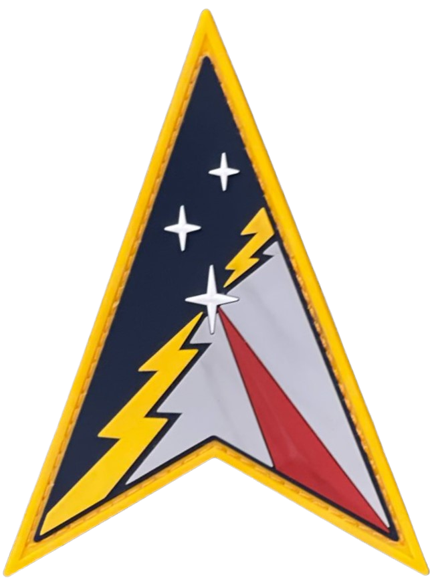
- Since July 2025 System Delta 810 does not have an insignia
- Active: July 10, 2025 - present
- Country: United States
- Branch: Space Force
- Role: System Delta
- Garrison/HQ: Los Angeles Air Force Base

Commanders
- Current commander: Col Nathan P. Vosters

Insignia
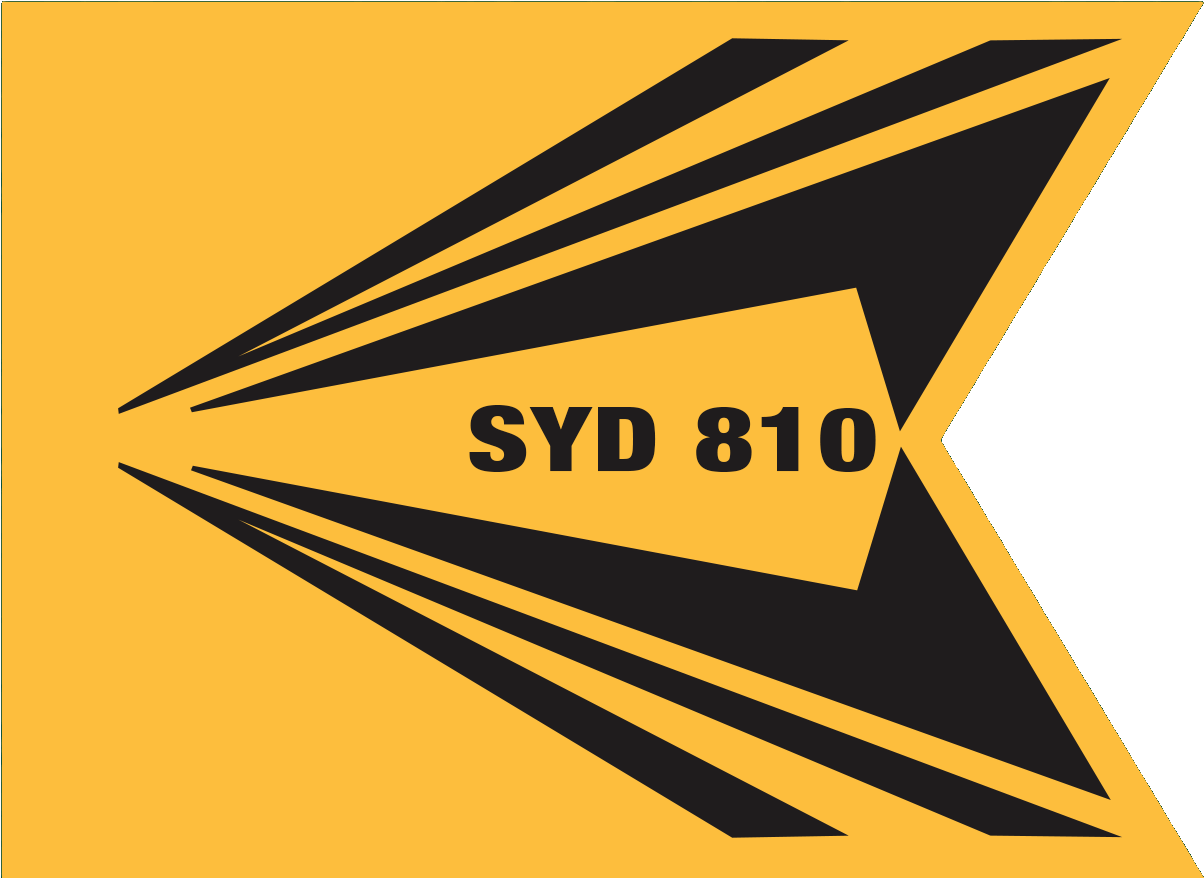
- SYD 810 GUIDON

System Delta 810 (SYD 810) is a unit of the United States Space Force (USSF) that was activated at Los Angeles Air Force Base on July 10, 2025 as a part of USSF Space Systems Command. Col. Dane Bannach assumed command of the unit as its first leader. The unit is responsible for Space-Based Sensing and Targeting (SBST) including Environmental Monitoring and Tactical Sensing. It also provides global cloud forecasting and theater weather imagery, for mission operations, planning and execution.

It will be linked to its partner delta SpOC Mission Delta 2. SYD 810 is part of the USSF's new structure to consolidate acquisition and support SpOC Mission Deltas. It was, along with System Delta 84 - the second SYD created by the USSF.

In January 2026, SYD 810 began the process of transitioning away from legacy weather satellites and began the acquisition process to find new high resolution compact imagers, space weather sensors to monitor solar activity, modular spacecraft platforms such as CubeSat to replenish or augment the existing constellation, and AI/ML processing software solutions to provide real-time “theater weather” to ground commanders.

== List of commanders ==
| No. | Commander | | Term | | | Ref |
| No. | Portrait | Name | Took office | Left office | Duration | Ref |
|---|---|---|---|---|---|---|
| 1 | Dane M. Bannach | Colonel; Dane M. Bannach | 10 July 2025 | 11 June 2026 | 336 days | |
| 2 | Nathan P. Vosters | Colonel; Nathan P. Vosters | 11 June 2026 | Incumbent | 158 days | |
