= 10th Delta Operations Squadron =

U.S. Space Force unit

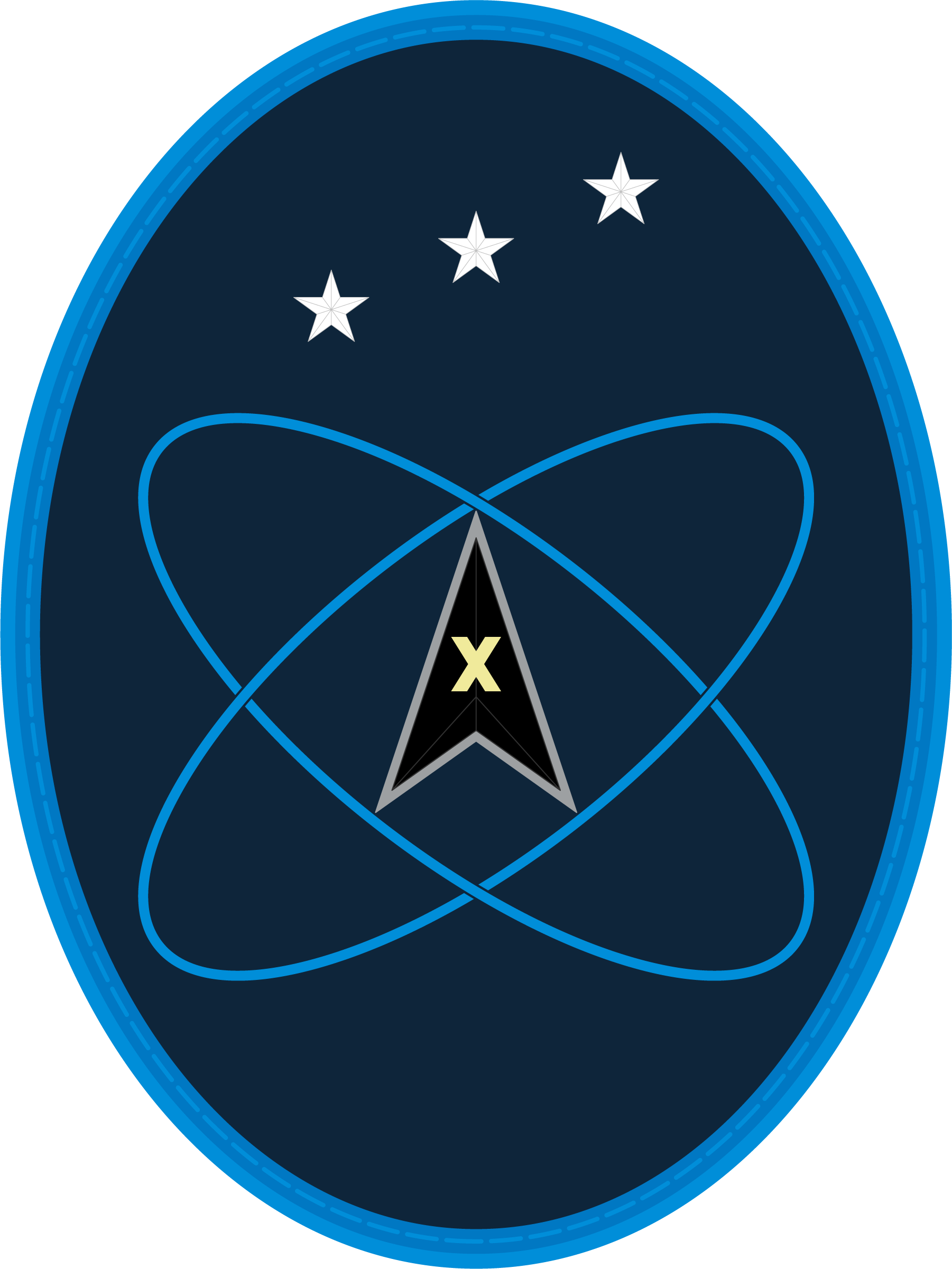
- Squadron emblem
- Active: 30 September 2021–present
- Country: United States
- Branch: United States Space Force
- Type: Squadron
- Role: Operations support (remissioning to a wargame operations squadron)
- Part of: Space Delta 10
- Headquarters: Patrick Space Force Base, Florida, U.S.
- Motto: "We Play to Win!"

Commanders
- Commander: Lt Col Justin Jones
- Senior Enlisted Leader: SMSgt Seth Souza

The 10th Delta Operations Squadron (10 DOS) is a United States Space Force unit assigned to Space Training and Readiness Command's Space Delta 10. Formerly headquartered at the United States Air Force Academy, Colorado, it was activated on 30 September 2021 following a ceremonial activation of Space Delta 10. Currently 10 DOS is headquartered at Patrick Space Force Base as of May 2, 2025.

The squadron's primary mission is to execute the Space Force's wargaming mission. This involves several key functions:

- Advancing Joint and international Wargaming: 10 DOS works to elevate the Space Force's participation and role in wargames conducted with other branches of the U.S. military and international partners.
- Pioneering Wargame Training: The squadron manages the first-ever wargame education course for the Space Force, preparing Guardians for the complexities of strategic competition and conflict in space.
- Educating Senior Leaders: A critical role of the squadron is designing "whole-of-government" wargames. These wargames are tailored to educate senior decision-makers on the strategic value and application of space capabilities.

== Central Role in Premier Wargaming Events ==
The 10th Delta Operations Squadron organizes the Schriever Wargame Series. This biannual event involves participation from international, commercial, and civil partners, focusing on future conflict scenarios and the integration of space technologies. Insights from these wargames inform future force design, technology investments, and the development of international space operations policies.

== List of commanders ==
- Lt Col Jonisa McGlown, 30 September 2021 – 6 July 2023
- Lt Col Sheena Mira, 6 July 2023 – 2 May 2025
- Lt Col Justin Jones, 2 May 2025 - Present
