= 57th Space Aggressor Squadron =

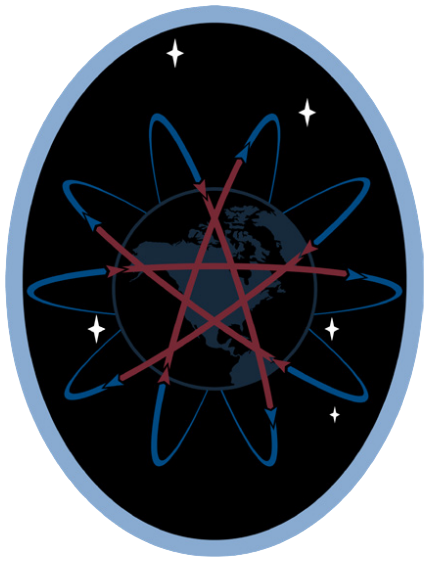
- Squadron emblem
- Active: 2022–present
- Country: United States
- Branch: United States Space Force
- Type: Squadron
- Role: Aggressor Squadron
- Part of: Space Delta 11
- Garrison/HQ: Schriever Space Force Base, Colorado

Commanders
- Current commander: Lt Col Justin Lugo

Insignia
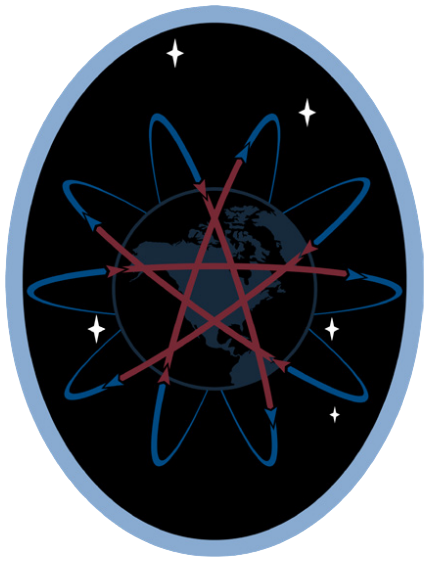
- 57th Space Aggressor Squadron emblem

The 57th Space Aggressor Squadron is a United States Space Force unit assigned to the Space Training and Readiness Command. It was activated after the creation of Space Training and Readiness Command and organized under Space Delta 11 to provide orbital warfare aggressors. It is stationed at Schriever Space Force Base, Colorado. The active duty squadron is supported by the United States Air Force Reserve's 26th Space Aggressor Squadron.

== Mission ==
57 SAS instills an adversary-focused warfighting culture through its mission to know, teach, and replicate modern, emerging, and integrated space threats via adversary threat academics and virtual/live replication of adversary space and counterspace threats.

The squadron replicates enemy systems and tactics during tests and training exercises. It provides Space Force, joint and coalition military personnel with an understanding of how to recognize, mitigate, counter and defeat these threats to prevail in competition.

== History ==
The 57th was activated 15 September 2021. Early contributions to U.S. Space Force readiness include participation in exercise Red Skies and the creation of the "stars" series aggressor-led events.

== Lineage ==
- Activated on 15 September 2021

=== Assignments ===
- Space Delta 11, 15 September 2021–present

=== Stations ===
- Schriever Space Force Base, CO, 15 September 2021–present

=== Aircraft ===
None.

== List of commanders ==
- Lt Col Josh "Halo" Werner, 15 September 2021 – 9 June 2023
- Lt Col Jessica "THUMPER" Getrost, 9 June 2023 – 14 June 2025
- Lt Col Justin "Hawka" Lugo, 14 June 2025 - current
