= 55th Training Squadron =

U.S. Space Force unit

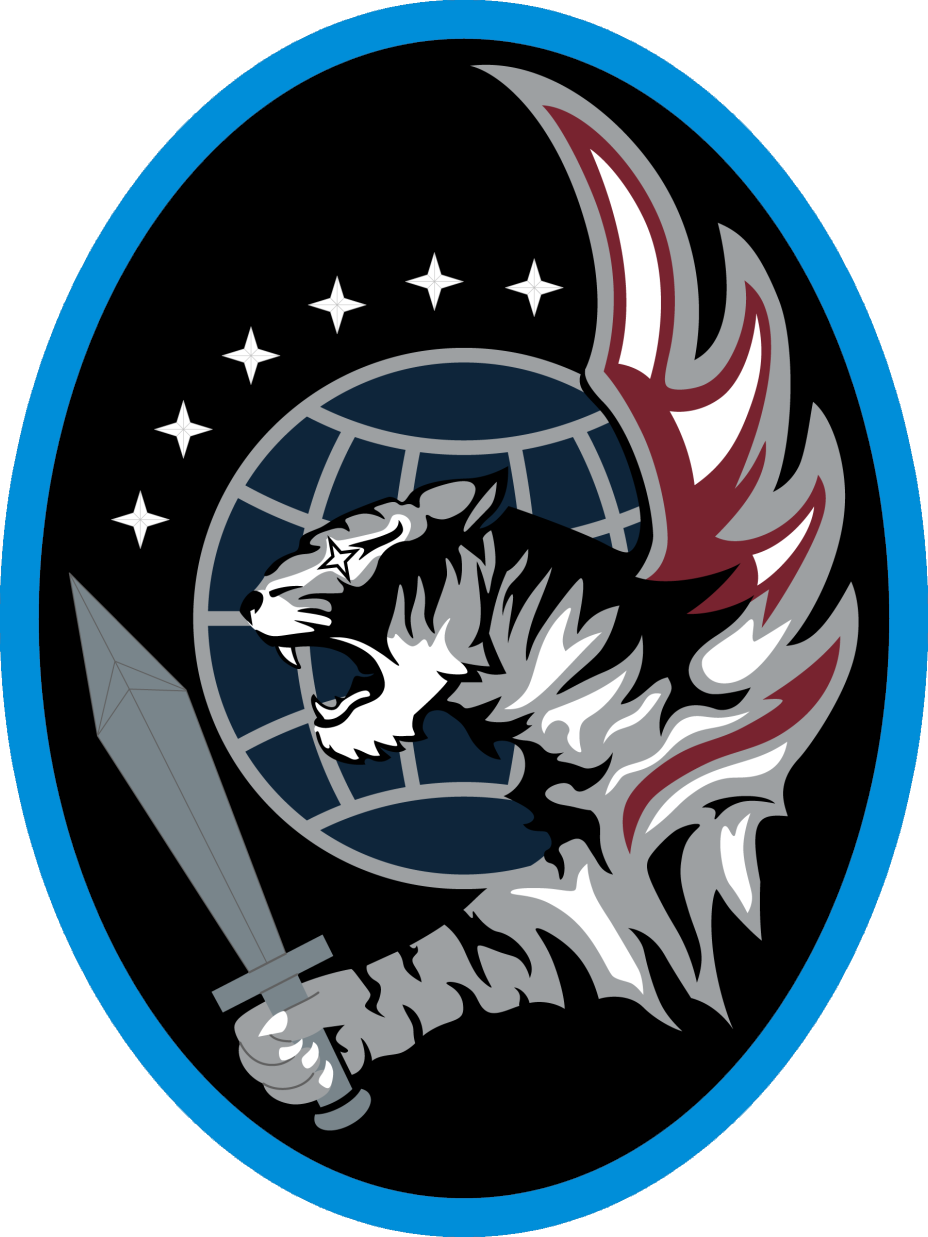
- Squadron emblem
- Active: 16 December 2016 – present
- Country: United States
- Branch: United States Space Force
- Type: Squadron
- Role: C2 Training
- Part of: Space Delta 11
- Headquarters: Vandenberg Space Force Base, California, U.S.
- Nickname: Fighting Tigers

Commanders
- Commander: Lt Col Mark Scott

Insignia
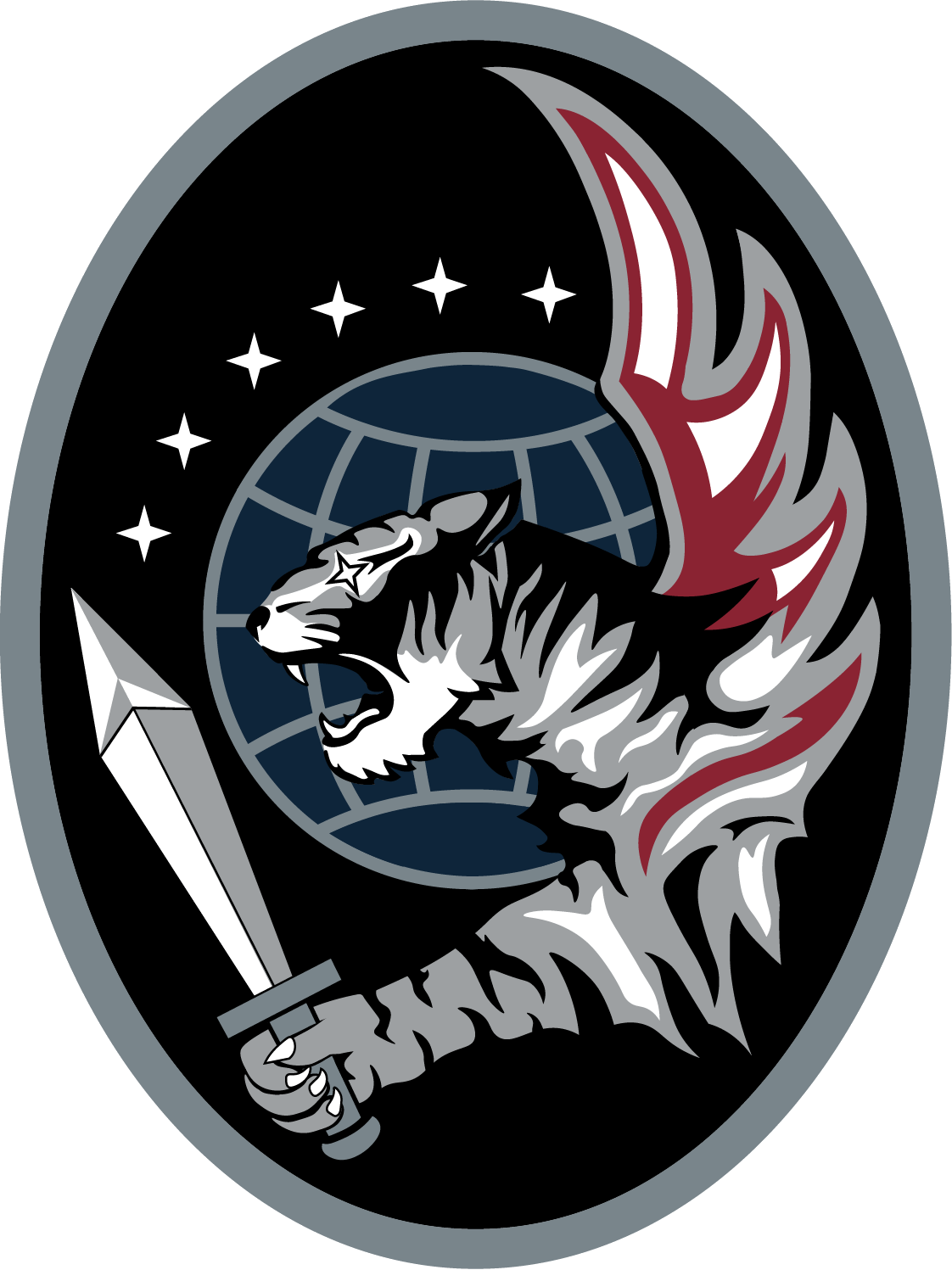
- Former 55th Combat Training Squadron emblem

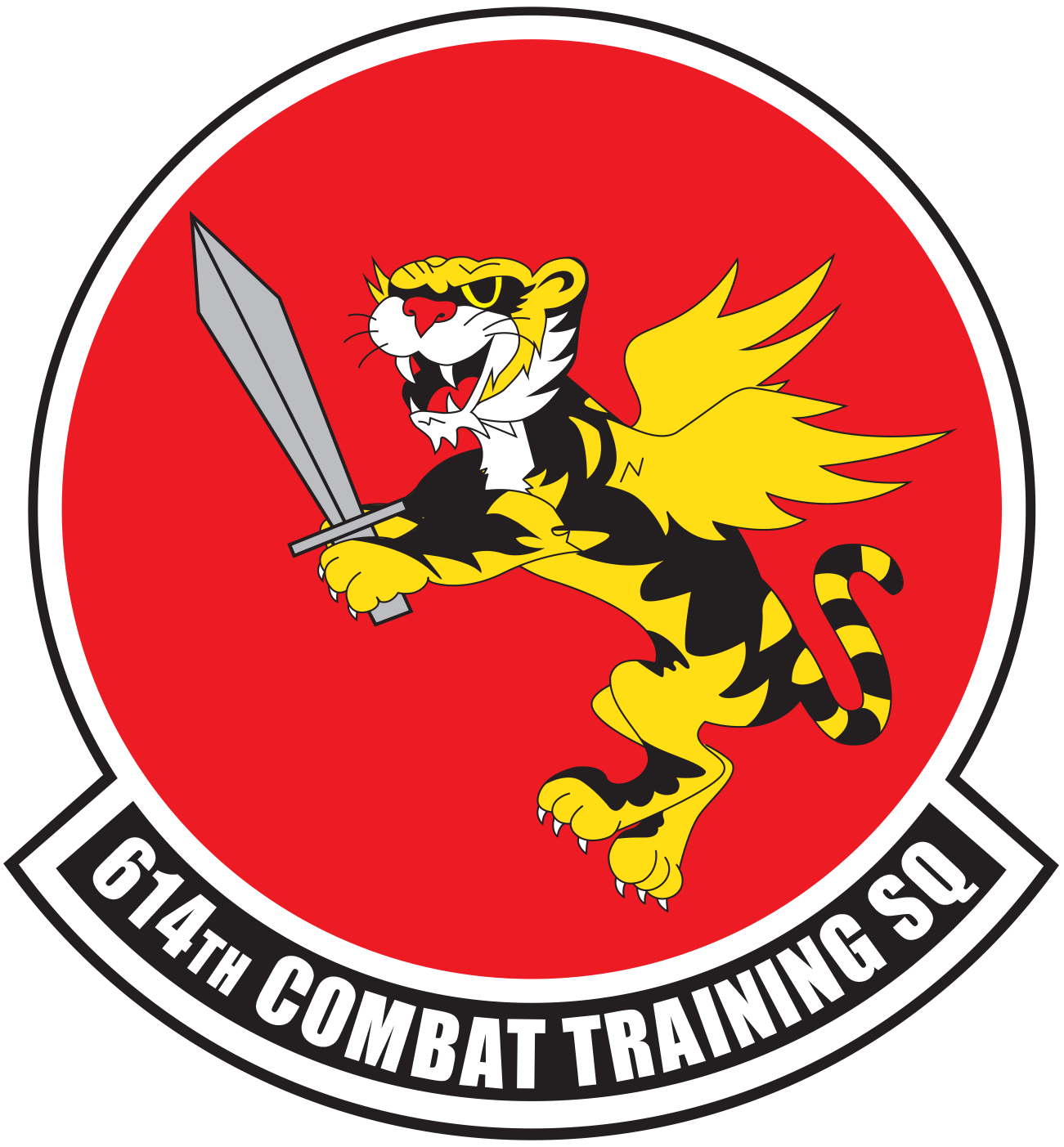
- Former 614th Combat Training Squadron emblem

The 55th Training Squadron (55 TRS) is a unit of the United States Space Force assigned to Space Training and Readiness Command's Space Delta 11. Formerly the 55 CTS, the squadron was activated on 17 June 2025 to implement and sustain enterprise-wide command and control training for the Space Force. It is headquartered at Vandenberg Space Force Base, inCalifornia.

== History ==
The 55th Combat Training Squadron (55 CTS) was a unit of the United States Space Force assigned to United States Space Forces – Space's Space Delta 5. Formerly the 614 CTS, the squadron was activated on 16 December 2016 to implement and sustain enterprise-wide changes under the Space Training Transformation and Space Mission Force constructs.

== List of Commanders ==
| No. | Commander | | Term | | | Ref |
| No. | Portrait | Name | Took office | Left office | Term length | Ref |
|---|---|---|---|---|---|---|
| 1 | Nicole M. Petrucci | Lieutenant Colonel; Nicole M. Petrucci | 16 December 2016 | ~16 May 2019 | 2 years, 151 days | |
| 2 | Krista N. St. Romain | Lieutenant Colonel; Krista N. St. Romain | ~16 May 2019 | 16 June 2021 | 2 years, 31 days | |
| 3 | Forrest Poole | Lieutenant Colonel; Forrest Poole | 16 June 2021 | ~15 May 2023 | 1 year, 333 days | |
| 4 | Scott Voth | Lieutenant Colonel; Scott Voth | ~15 May 2023 | 17 June 2025 | 2 years, 33 days | |
| 5 | Mark Scott | Lieutenant Colonel; Mark Scott | 17 June 2025 | Incumbent | 1 year, 107 days | |

== See also ==
- Space Delta 11
