= System Delta 88 =

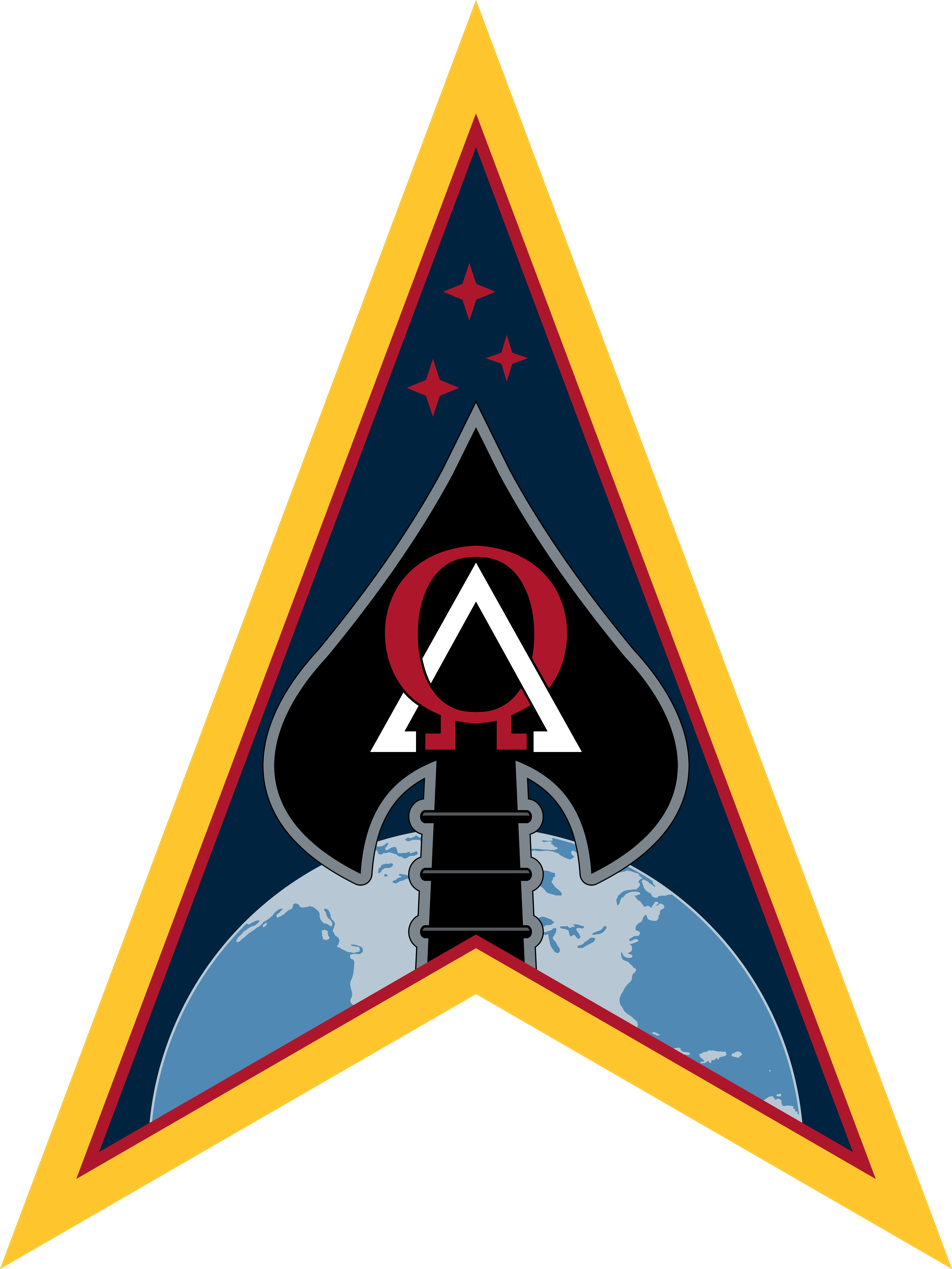
- Active: Sept. 12, 2025 - present
- Country: United States
- Branch: Space Force
- Role: System Delta
- Garrison/HQ: Los Angeles Air Force Base

Commanders
- Current commander: Col A.J. Ashby

Insignia
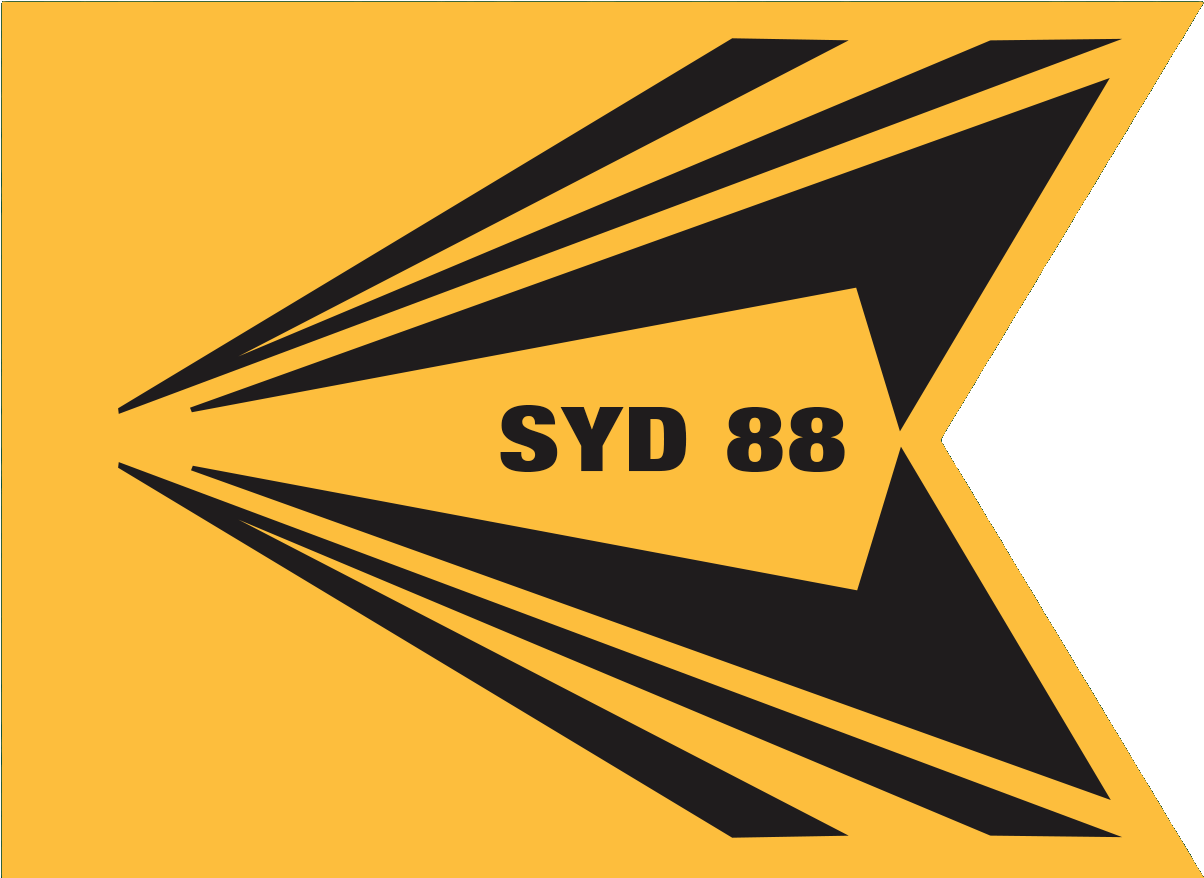
- SYD 88 GUIDON

Systems Delta 88 (SYD 88) is a unit of the United States Space Force (USSF) that was activated on September 12, 2025 at Los Angeles Air Force Base. The USSF says SYD 88 mission will focus on Satellite Communications and will report to the program executive office for Military Communications & Positioning, Navigation, and Timing (PNT). Col. A. J. Ashby assumed command of the new unit as their first leader. SYD 88 will be the mission partner of Space Delta 8. SYD 88 is part of the USSF's new structure to consolidate acquisition and support SpOC Mission Deltas.

In January 2026, SYD 88 began a 30-day Mission Qualification Training (MQT) to train acquisition specialists in both their own role as well as operations for both enlisted and officer guardians. The MQT program will be followed up by 60 and 90 day programs.
