= System Delta 80 =

Systems Delta 80
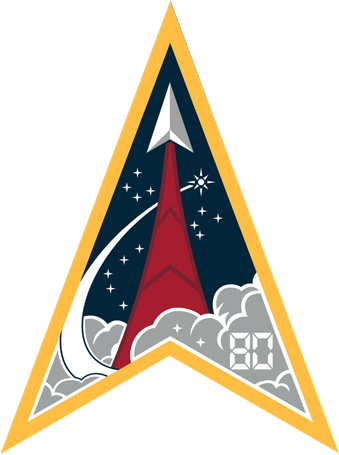
- Active: 7 October 2026 - present
- Country: United States
- Branch: Space Force
- Garrison/HQ: Cape Canaveral Space Force Station, Florida

Commanders
- Current commander: Col Ryan Hiserote

Insignia
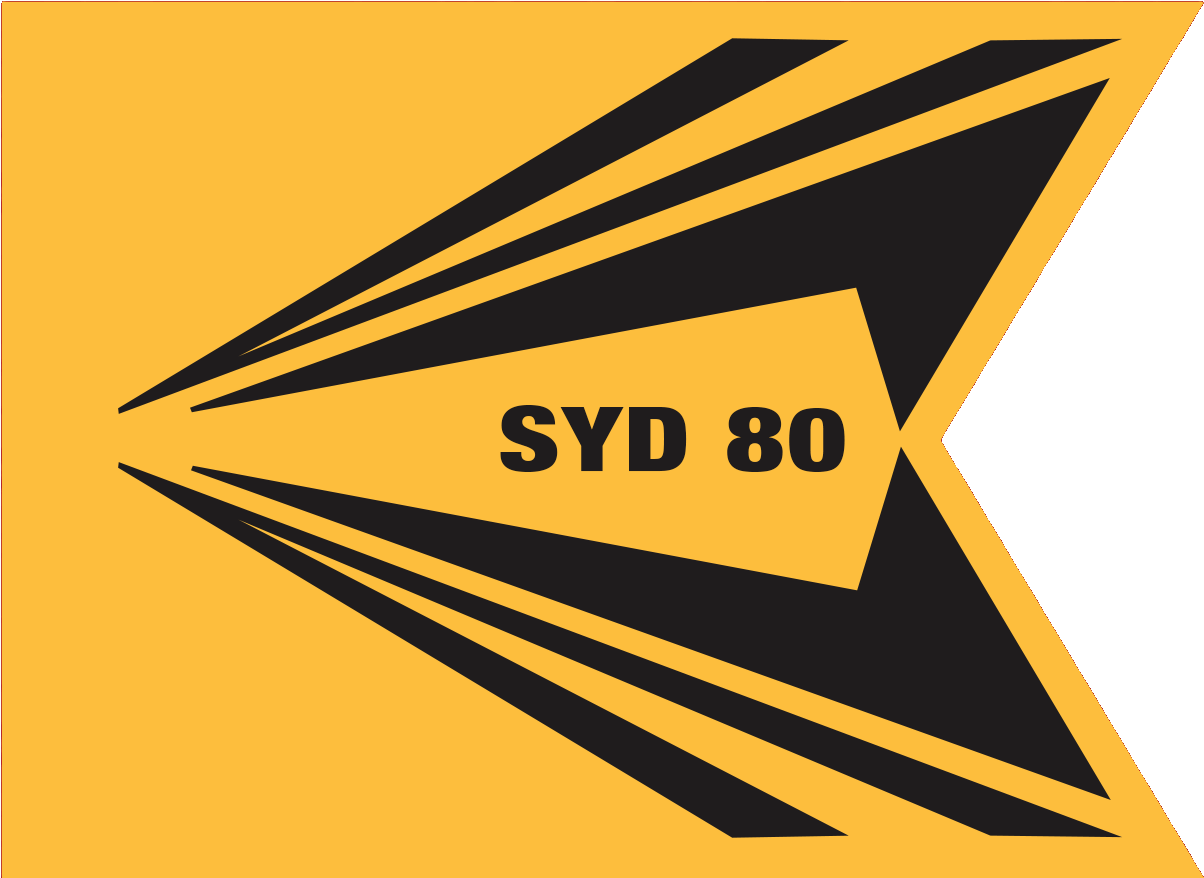
- SYD 80 Guidon

Systems Delta 80 (SYD 80) is a unit of the United States Space Force (USSF) that was activated on December 12, 2025. SYD 80 is responsible for national security space launches, rocket systems launches, launch and test range systems and servicing, and logistics and will report to Space Systems Command (SSC).

== History ==
SYD 80 will be integrated with Space Launch Delta 30 at Vandenberg Space Force Base and Space Launch Delta 45 at Patrick Space Force Base. The creation of Systems Delta 80 is the end of a series of SYD's that the Space Force had been creating to manage acquisitions, procurement and support.

Currently SYD 80 is launching payloads using the Space X Falcon 9 and United Launch Alliance Vulcan rockets at both Vandenberg Space Force Base and Cape Canaveral Space Force Station. SYD 80 feels that using both platforms provides flexibility and additional capabilities, especially in a congested launch environment.

== List of commanders ==
No.	Commander		Term			Ref
No.	Portrait	Name	Took office	Left office	Duration	Ref
1	Ryan M. Hiserote	Colonel; Ryan M. Hiserote	7 October 2025	Incumbent	1 year, 24 days	
