= System Delta 85 =

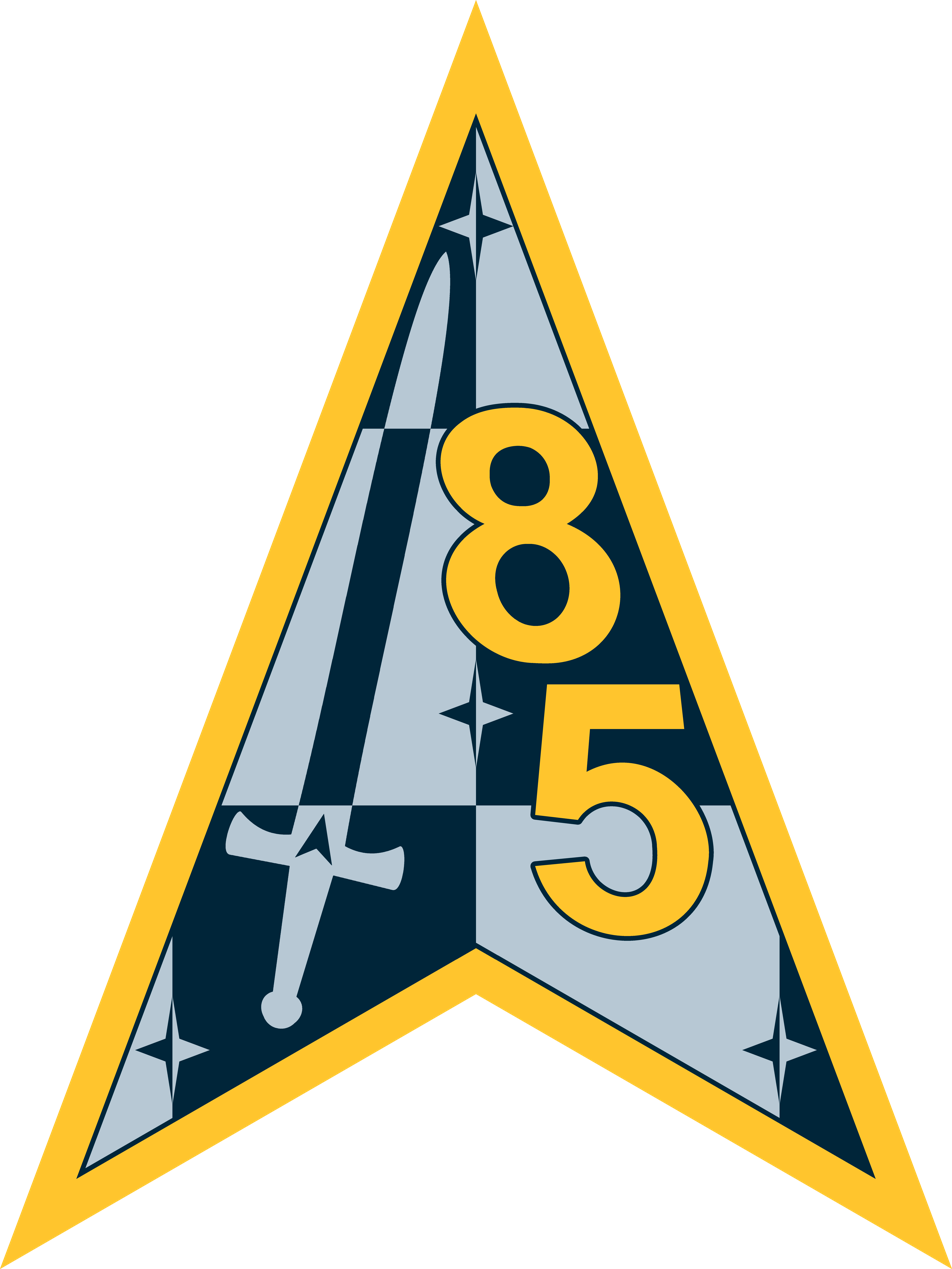
- Delta has no insignia emblem as of August 2025
- Active: August 8, 2025 - present
- Country: United States
- Branch: Space Force
- Type: Systems Delta
- Part of: Space Systems Command
- Garrison/HQ: Peterson Space Force Base, Colorado Springs, CO

Commanders
- Current commander: Col Jason E. West

Insignia
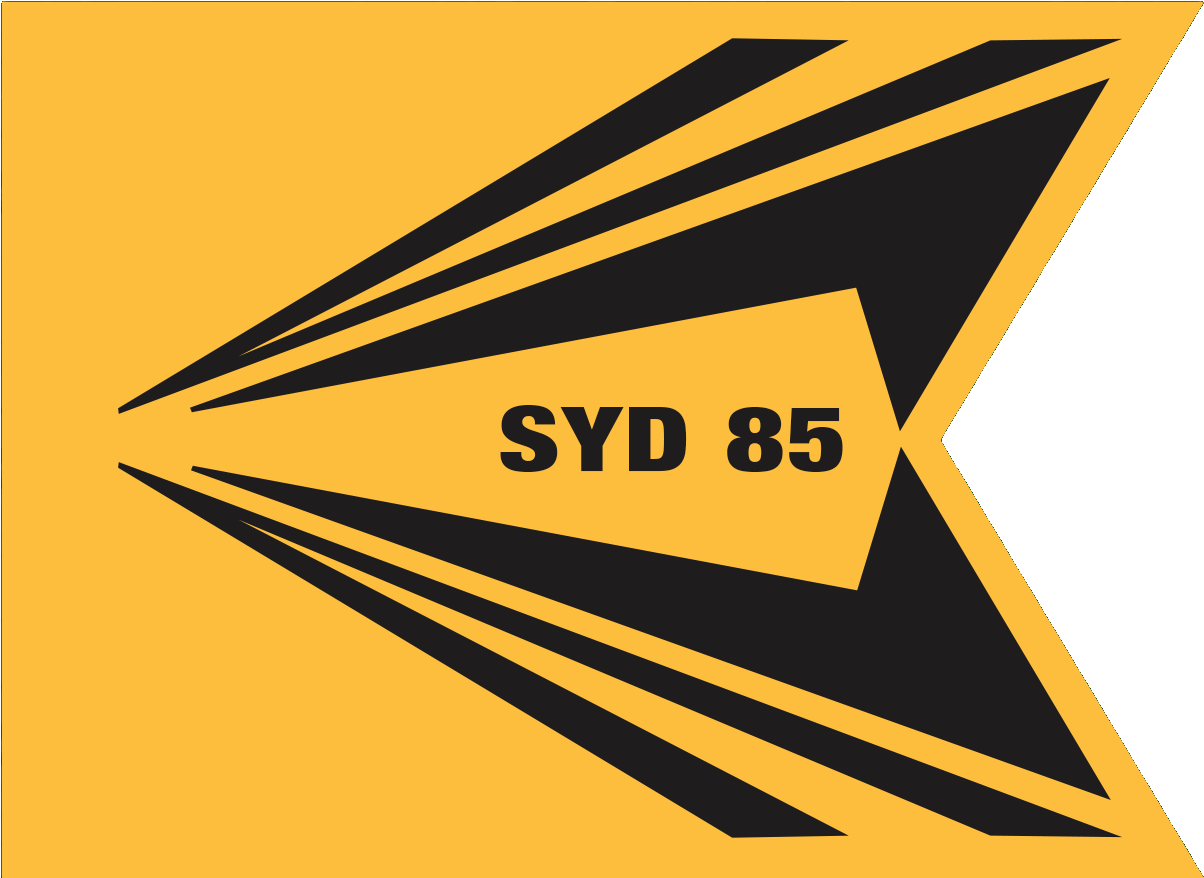
- SYD 85 GUIDON

Systems Delta 85 (SYD 85) is a unit of the United States Space Force (USSF) that was activated on August 8, 2025. The USSF says SYD 85 is focused on battle-space awareness, battle management and space access. The unit monitors space for threats and operational safety, tracks potential missiles, defends against missiles and manages space intelligence. Col. Jason West assumed command of the unit as its first leader. The Delta is stationed at Peterson Space Force Base in Colorado Springs, Colorado and is a subordinate to the Space Systems Command. It is the fifth system delta of the USSF. SYD 85 is part of the USSF's new structure to consolidate acquisition and support SpOC Mission Deltas.

In January 2026, SYD 85 opened KRONOS Commercial Solutions Opening (CSO) allowing the Space Force unit to bypass the Federal Acquisition Regulations when buying off-the-shelf commercial products.

As of February 2026, SYD 85 has been put in command of the Space Domain Awareness Tools, Applications, and Processing Lab (SDA TAP Lab) and in a partnership with the University of Texas at Austin, to develop command‑and‑control tools from industry and universities under a quicker timeline.

== List of commanders ==
No.	Commander		Term			Ref
No.	Portrait	Name	Took office	Left office	Duration	Ref
1	Jason E. West	Colonel; Jason E. West	8 August 2026	Incumbent	84 days	
