= System Delta 81 =

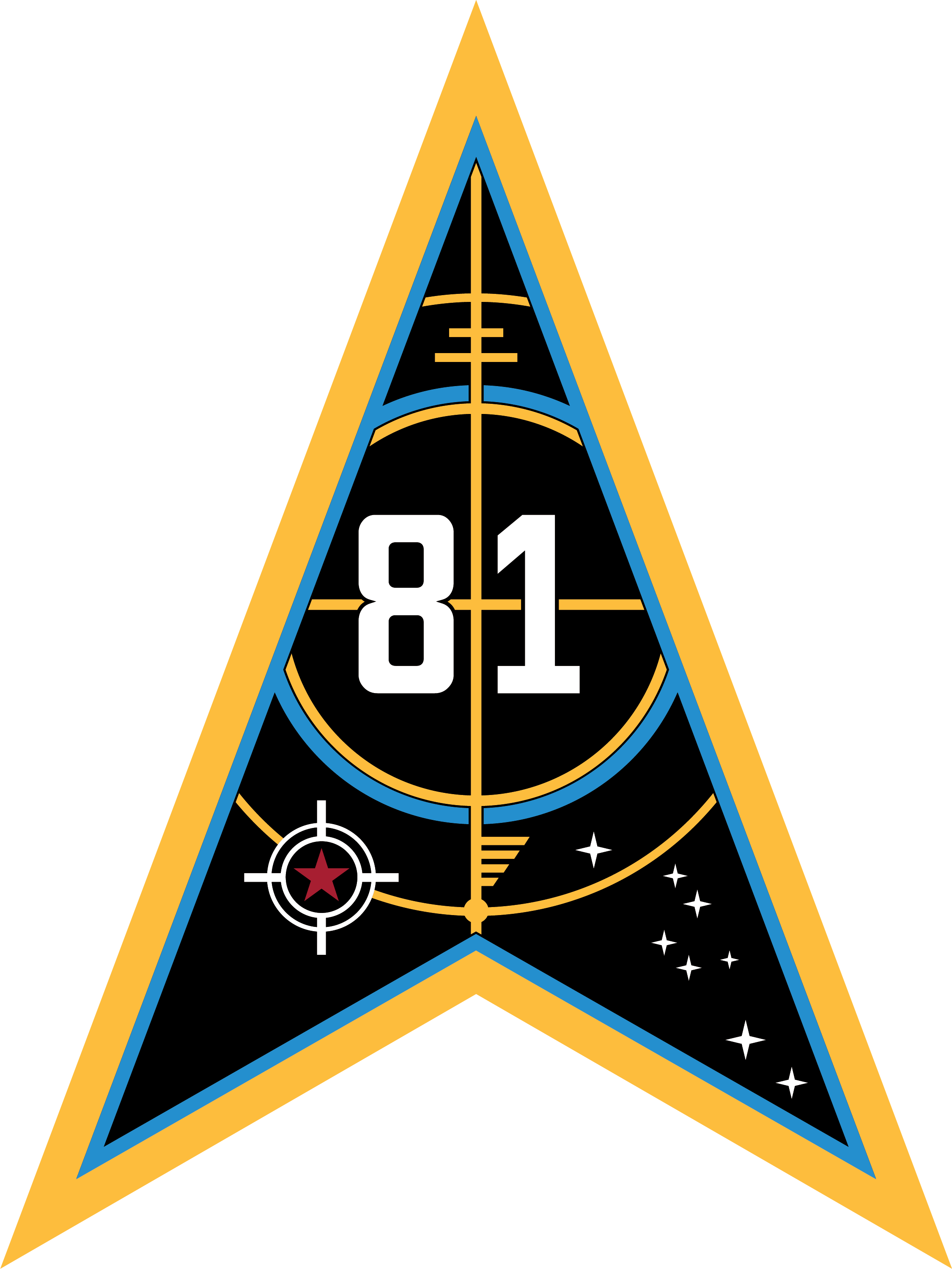
- Active: September 9, 2025 - present
- Country: United States
- Branch: Space Force
- Type: Delta
- Garrison/HQ: Peterson Space Force Base

Commanders
- Current commander: Col Margaret A. Sullivan

Insignia
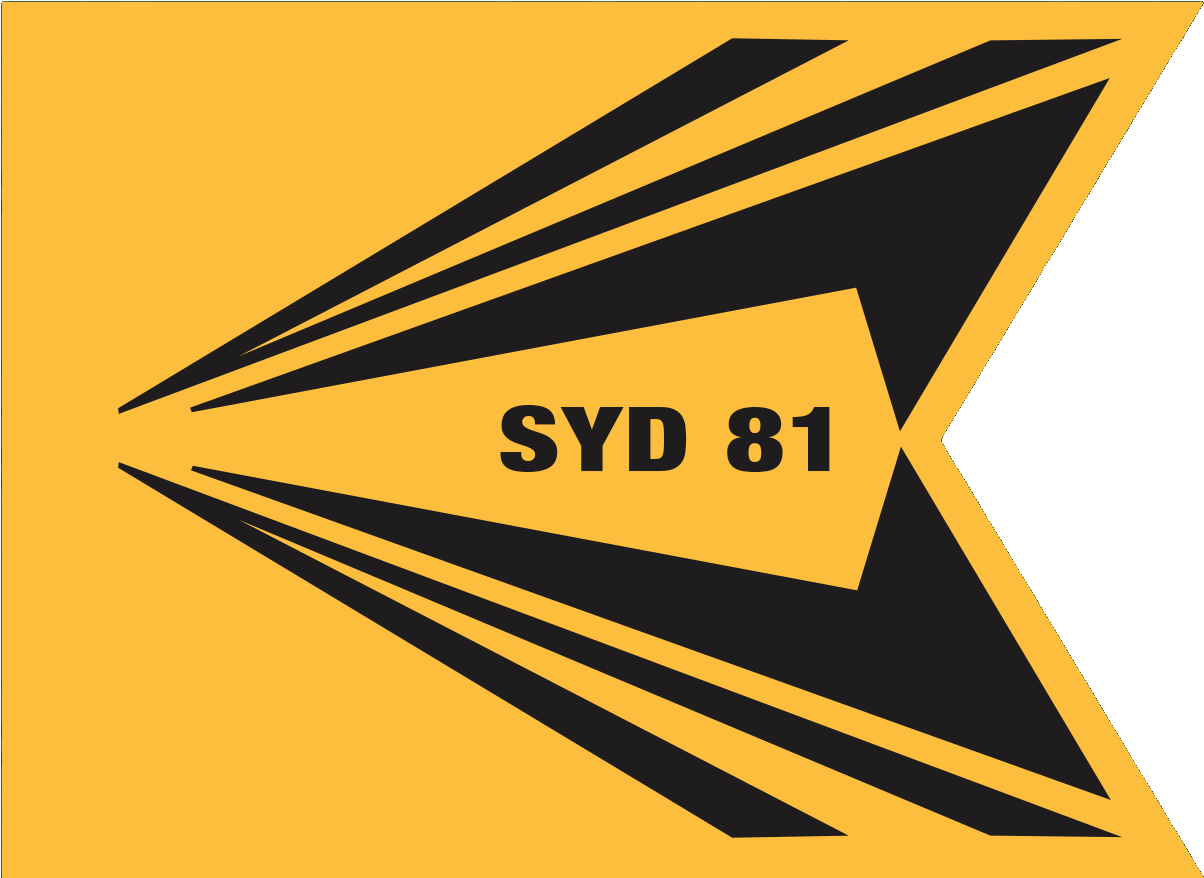
- SYD 81 GUIDON

System Delta 81 (SYD 81) is a unit of the United States Space Force (USSF) that was activated at Peterson Space Force Base on September 9, 2025. The unit supports Space Training and Readiness Command (STARCOM) by developing High-End Advance Test, Training and Tactics (HEAT3), training and live testing including war games and exercises. Col. Corey Klopstein assumed command of the unit as its first leader. The Delta is stationed at Peterson Space Force Base in Colorado Springs, Colorado and is a subordinate to the Space Systems Command. It is the sixth system delta of the USSF.

SYD 81 is part of the USSF's new structure to consolidate acquisition and support SpOC Mission Deltas and is subordinate to the Operational Test and Training Infrastructure (OTTI). This mission will focus on an indefinite delivery/indefinite quantity (ID/IQ) approach to establish a pool of qualified vendors who can fulfill specific requirements to be released in summer 2026.

SYD 81 is developing the Space Warfighter Operational Readiness Domain (SWORD) training environment to train guardians in orbital dynamics, electronic warfare, cyber effects and adversary tactics.

== List of commanders ==
No.	Commander		Term			Ref
No.	Portrait	Name	Took office	Left office	Duration	Ref
1	Corey J. Klopstein	Colonel; Corey J. Klopstein	9 September 2025	6 August 2026	331 days	
2	Margaret A. Sullivan	Colonel; Margaret A. Sullivan	6 August 2026	Incumbent	86 days	
