= System Delta 831 =

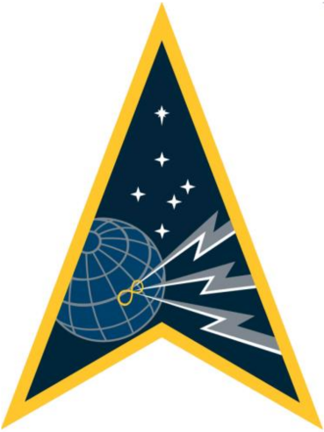
- Active: October 2, 2025 - present
- Country: United States
- Allegiance: Space Systems Command
- Branch: United States Space Force
- Size: Delta
- Garrison/HQ: Los Angeles Air Force Base

Commanders
- Current commander: Col Neil B. Barnas

Insignia
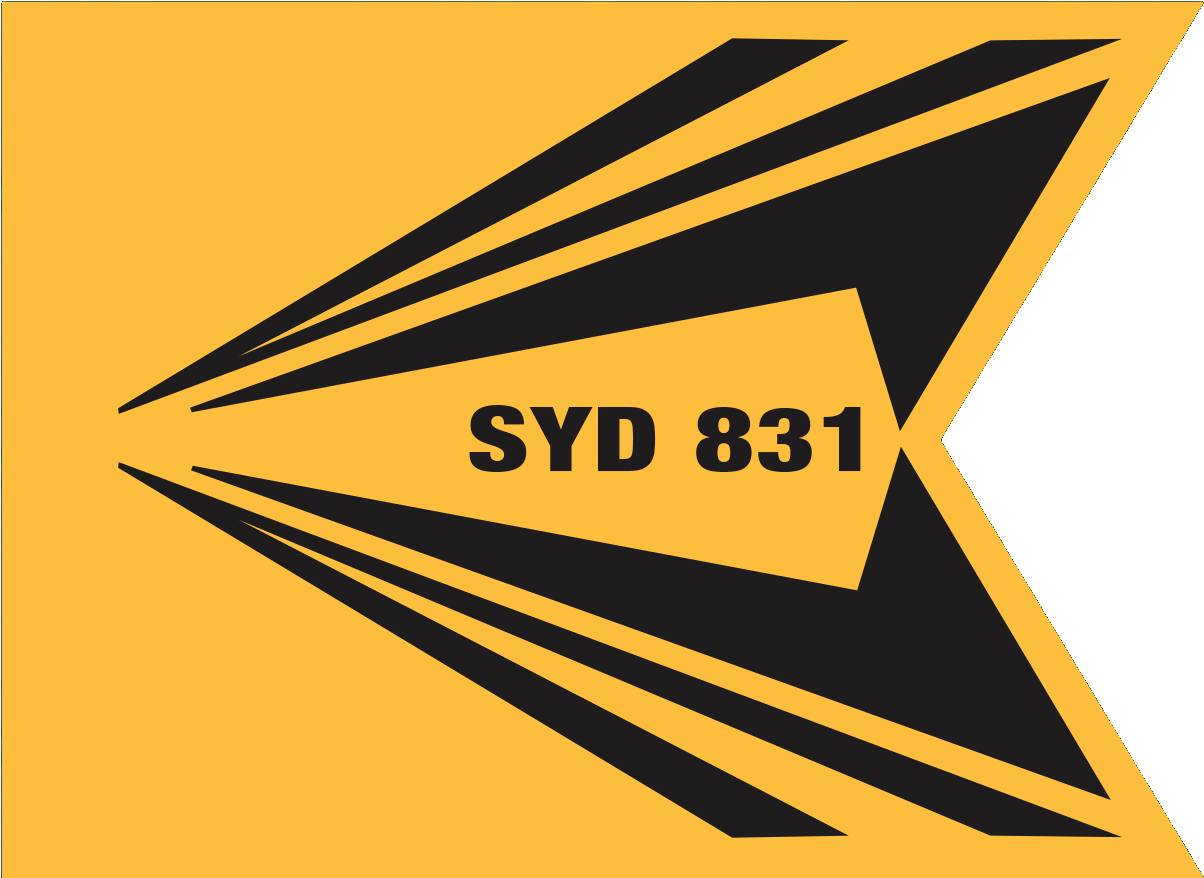
- SYD 831 GUIDON

The System Delta 831 (SYD 831) is a unit of the United States Space Force. The unit's mission is to support Space Systems Command’s Military Communications & Positioning, Navigation, and Timing (MCPNT) Program Executive Office and will work in conjunction with Space Mission Delta 31.

== Mission ==
SYD 831 combines engineering, program management, logistics, finance and contracting into one unit. The unit will be fielding and developing integrated Global Positioning Systems satellites to deliver MCPNT to US military forces, international partner forces and civilian companies. “GPS is also critical infrastructure to our nation’s economy and transportation networks. In this new era of a contested space domain, we must think differently about how we develop, deliver, and modernize our Navigation Warfare systems to ensure we stay ahead of the threat and secure our way of life," said Col. Neil Barnas, the unit's first commander.

SYD 831 announced Project Hecate, a study to provide new solutions to future GPS architecture, in January 2026 in conjunction with the Space Warfighting Analysis Center (SWAC). “We are very experienced in thinking about GPS jamming from a terrestrial perspective, and I think we are going to continue to see those challenges expand into space,” Col. Barnas said. “We need to be thinking about multi-orbit, multi-frequency, commercial, international. It’s a very broad scope within that study."

== List of commanders ==
| No. | Commander | | Term | | | Ref |
| No. | Portrait | Name | Took office | Left office | Duration | Ref |
|---|---|---|---|---|---|---|
| 1 | Neil B. Barnas | Colonel; Neil B. Barnas (born c. 1980) | 2 October 2025 | Incumbent | 1 year, 26 days | |
