= System Delta 84 =

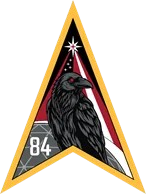
- Active: July 10, 2025 - present
- Country: United States
- Branch: Space Force
- Role: System Delta
- Garrison/HQ: Los Angeles Air Force Base

Commanders
- Current commander: Col Stevie Medeiros

Insignia
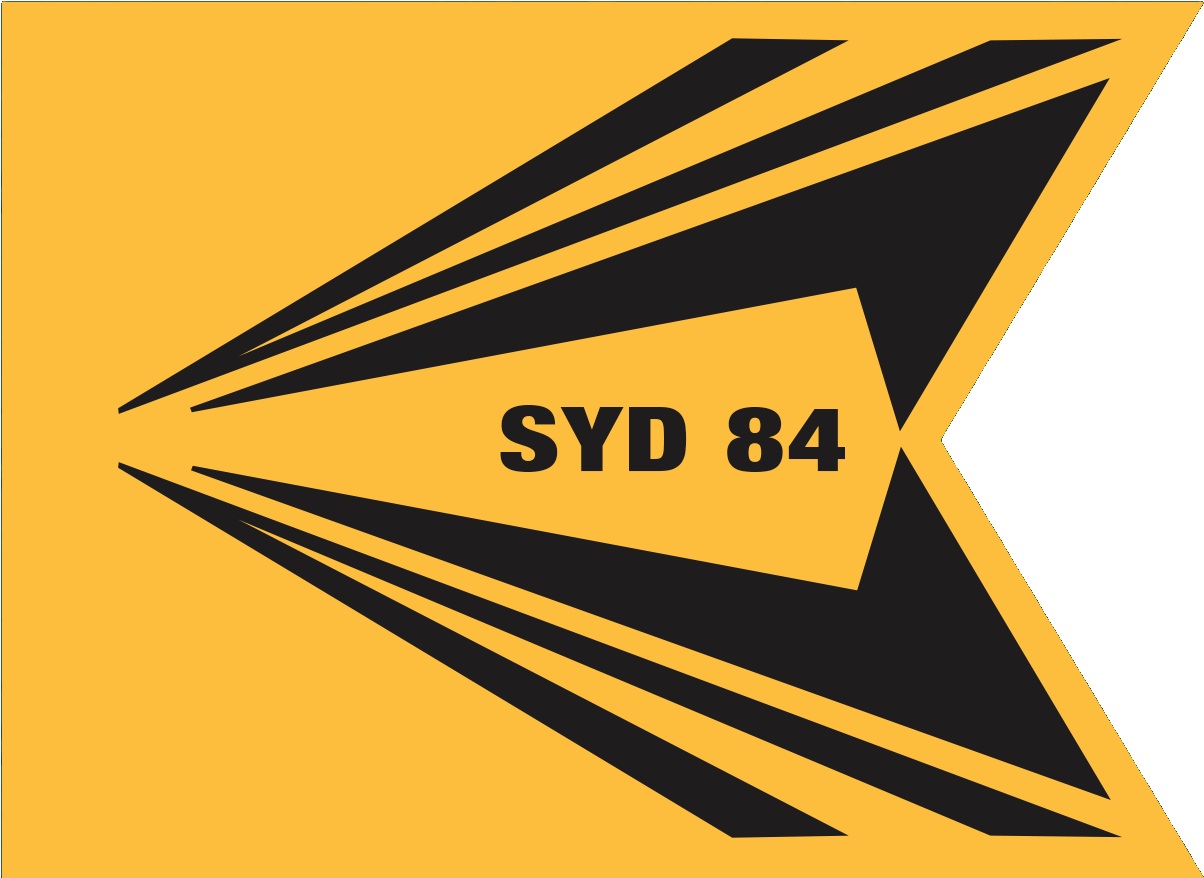
- SYD 84 GUIDON

System Delta 84 (SYD 84) is a unit of the United States Space Force (USSF) that was activated at Los Angeles Air Force Base on July 10, 2025 as a part of USSF Space Systems Command. Col. Stevie Medeiros assumed command of the unit as its first leader. The unit is responsible for Space-Based Missile Warning and Tracking, including threats such as hypersonic weapons and will be linked to its partner delta SpOC Mission Delta 4. The Delta is the first system delta of the USSF. SYD 84 is part of the USSF's new structure to consolidate acquisition and support SpOC Mission Deltas.
