= 850th Space Communications Squadron =

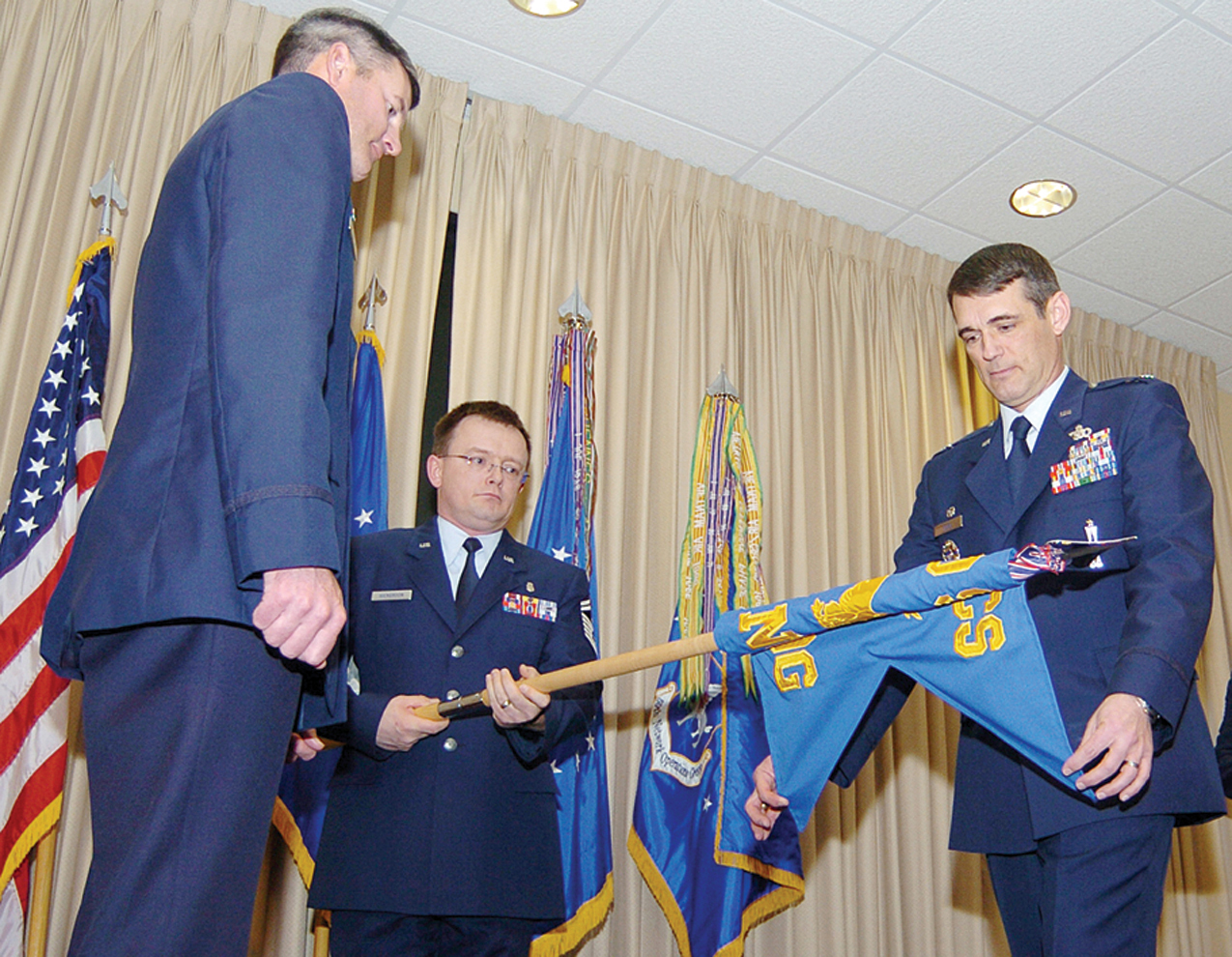
- 850th Space Communications Squadron inactivation ceremony
- Active: 1997–2006
- Country: United States
- Branch: United States Air Force
- Role: Communications
- Part of: Air Force Space Command
- Motto: Maintaining the High Frontier
- Decorations: Air Force Outstanding Unit Award

Insignia
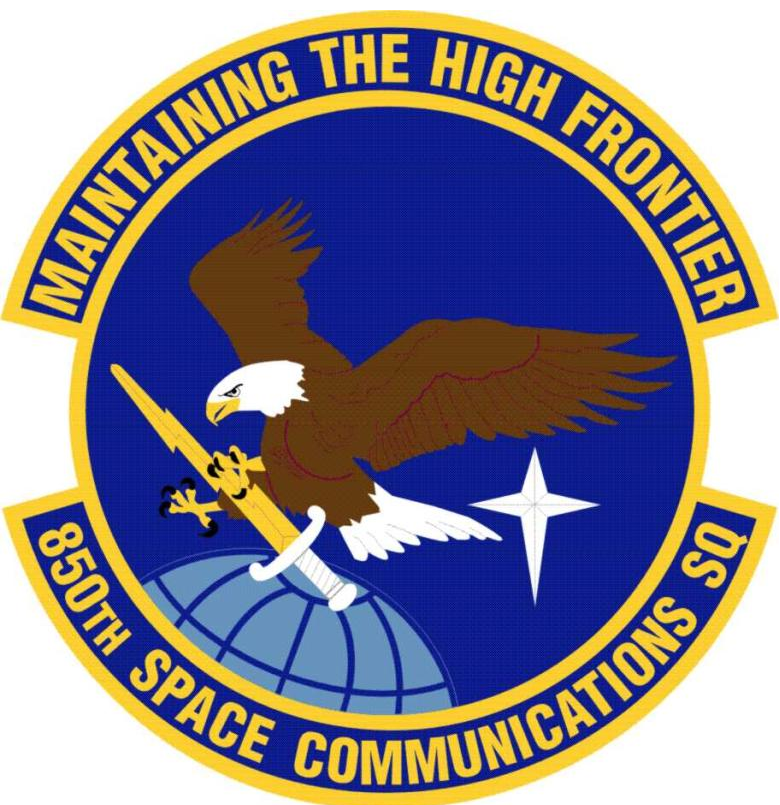
- 850th Space Communications Squadron emblem

The 850th Space Communications Squadron is an inactive United States Air Force unit. It was a component of the 50th Network Operations Group, 50th Space Wing, Schriever Air Force Base, Colorado. The squadron was activated 1 December 1997 as the 850th Communications Squadron and redesignated the 850th Space Communications Squadron on 1 October 2002. It was inactivated on 31 January 2006, most of its functions and personnel having been incorporated into the 50th Space Communications Squadron.

== Mission ==
The mission of the 850th Space Communications Squadron was to plan, integrate, and maintain command and control, and common user communications and computer systems for satellite navigation, communications, missile warning and space surveillance worldwide.

The squadron was responsible for logistics management, systems maintenance, and integrity of satellite command, control, communications, and computer systems for the Air Force Space Command mission including the $6.2 billion Air Force Satellite Control Network, supporting over 140 Department of Defense satellites. The squadron also provided anomaly resolution, systems integration and configuration control supporting AFSPC, USSTRATCOM, the Secretary of Defense, and the President.

== Personnel ==
Shortly before its inactivation in early 2006, there were approximately 59 military and 22 DoD civilian personnel in the squadron who, along with contractors, provided global sustainment and maintenance to the high frontier in support of the 50th Space Wing's mission.

== Lineage ==
- Constituted as the 850th Communications Squadron
- Activated on 1 December 1997
- Redesignated 850th Space Communications Squadron on 1 October 2002
- Inactivated on 31 January 2006

=== Assignments ===
- 50th Communications Group, 1 December 1997
- 50th Maintenance Group 1 October 2002
- 50th Communications Group (later 50th Network Operations Group), 1 June 2003 – 31 January 2006

=== Stations ===
- Schriever Air Force Base, Colorado, 1 December 1997 – 31 January 2006

== Awards ==
The squadron was awarded two Air Force Outstanding Unit Awards:

- 1 Oct 2000 - 1 Oct 2001
- 1 Oct 2001 - 1 Oct 2002

== See also ==
- List of United States Air Force communications squadrons
