= 50th Space Wing =

Inactive United States Air Force wing

50th Wing
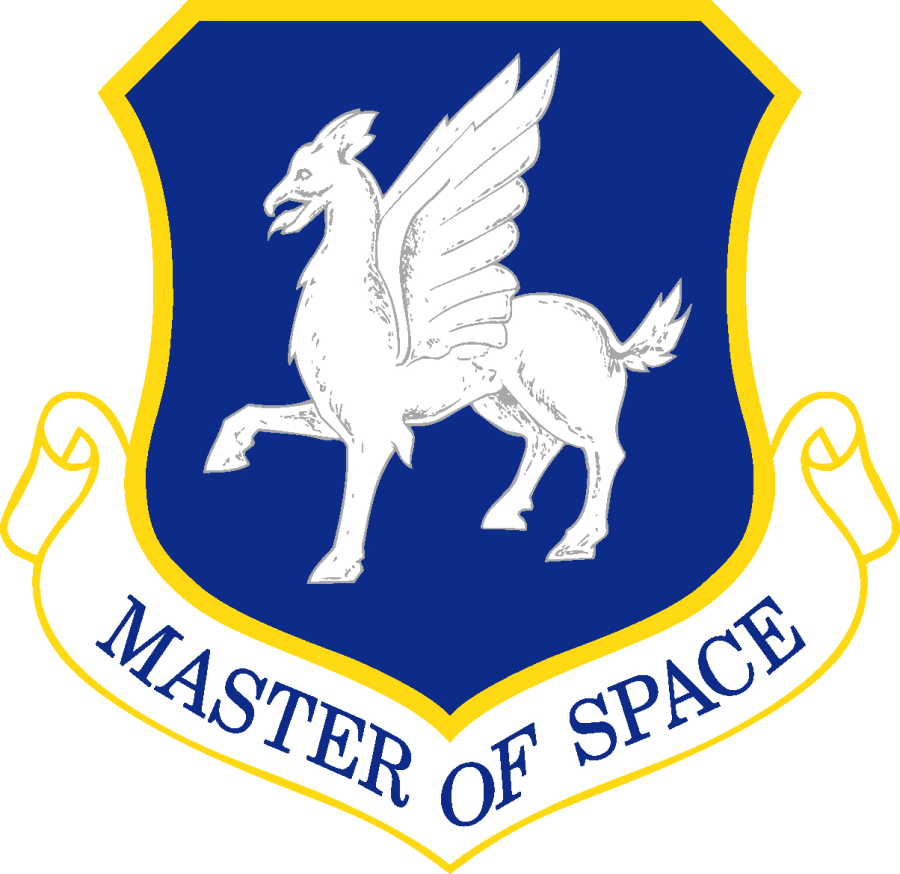
- Shield of the 50th Wing
- Active: 1 June 1949 (as 50th Fighter Wing)–24 July 2020
- Country: United States
- Branch: United States Air Force
- Type: Wing
- Motto: "Master of the Air"
- Engagements: Defense of Saudi Arabia; Liberation and Defense of Kuwait Operation Enduring Freedom; Operation Iraqi Freedom; Operation New Dawn; Operation Noble Eagle; Operation Inherent Resolve

- Decorations: Distinguished Unit Citation Air Force Outstanding Unit Award

The 50th Space Wing is an inactive United States Air Force wing.

It was activated in 1949 as the 50th Fighter Wing, serving as a reserve air defense unit, and was redesignated as the 50th Fighter-Interceptor Wing in 1950, before being inactivated in 1951. It was reactivated in 1953 as the 50th Fighter-Bomber Wing, deploying to Europe to join NATO forces, and was redesignated as the 50th Tactical Fighter Wing in 1958. The wing operated for almost 40 years at Hahn Air Base in West Germany. In 1981 it became the first USAF overseas formation to operate the General Dynamics F-16 Fighting Falcon jet. It deployed for the Persian Gulf War of 1991, before being inactivated later that year. It was activated as a space wing on 30 January 1992, replacing the 2nd Space Wing. The 50th Space Wing was inactivated on 24 July 2020 and replaced by the Peterson-Schriever Garrison, with the 50th Network Operations Group and its cyber and satellite control network units forming Space Delta 6, the 50th Operations Group and its satellite communications units forming Space Delta 8, and the 750th Operations Group and its orbital warfare units forming Space Delta 9.

== Operations ==
The 50th Space Wing was the United States Space Force's space and cyberspace warfare. The 50th Space Wing operated the Global Positioning System (GPS), Defense Satellite Communications System (DSCS), Wideband Global Satellite Communications system, Military Strategic and Tactical Relay, Defense Meteorological Satellite Program, Space Based Space Surveillance system, Operationally Responsive Space satellite system, Advanced Extremely High Frequency satellite system, and the Boeing X-37B Orbital Test Vehicle. It also operated the Air Force Satellite Control Network. At the time of its inactivation on 24 July 2020, the 50th Space Wing had 8,000 space professionals and airmen under its command.

The 50th Space Wing was also the host unit for Schriever Air Force Base, providing base support for United States Strategic Command's Joint Functional Component Command for Integrated Missile Defense, the Army's 100th Missile Defense Brigade, and Air Force Reserve Command's 310th Space Wing.

== Structure in 2020 ==
50th Operations Group (50 OG)

- 2nd Space Operations Squadron (2 SOPS)
- 4th Space Operations Squadron (4 SOPS)
- 50th Operations Support Squadron (50 OSS)
- Detachment 1, 50th Operations Group, Suitland, Maryland

50th Network Operations Group (50 NOG)

- 21st Space Operations Squadron (21 SOPS), Vandenberg Air Force Base
  - Detachment 1, 21st Space Operations Squadron, Naval Support Facility Diego Garcia
  - Detachment 2, 21st Space Operations Squadron, Andersen Air Force Base
  - Detachment 3, 21st Space Operations Squadron, Kaena Point Satellite Tracking Station
- 22nd Space Operations Squadron (22 SOPS)
- 23rd Space Operations Squadron (23 SOPS), New Boston Air Force Station
  - Detachment 1, 23rd Space Operations Squadron, Thule Air Base
  - OL-A, 23rd Space Operations Squadron, RAF Oakhanger
- 50th Space Communications Squadron (50 SCS)

50th Mission Support Group (50 MSG) - the 50th Support Group was formerly the 1002nd Space Support Group which was activated October 1, 1989.

- 50th Civil Engineer Squadron
- 50th Contracting Squadron
- 50th Force Support Squadron
- 50th Security Forces Squadron - formerly the 1002nd Special Security Squadron which was activated on October 1, 1985. The squadron was renamed the 1002d Security Police Squadron on October 1, 1989, as part of Air Force Space Command's support structure reorganization. 50th SFS activated 30 January 1992.
- 50th Logistics Readiness Flight (50 LRF)

750th Operations Group (750 OG)

- 1st Space Operations Squadron (1 SOPS)
- 3d Space Experimentation Squadron (3 SES)
- 750th Operations Support Squadron (750 OSS)

50th Comptroller Squadron (50 CPTS)

== Shield ==
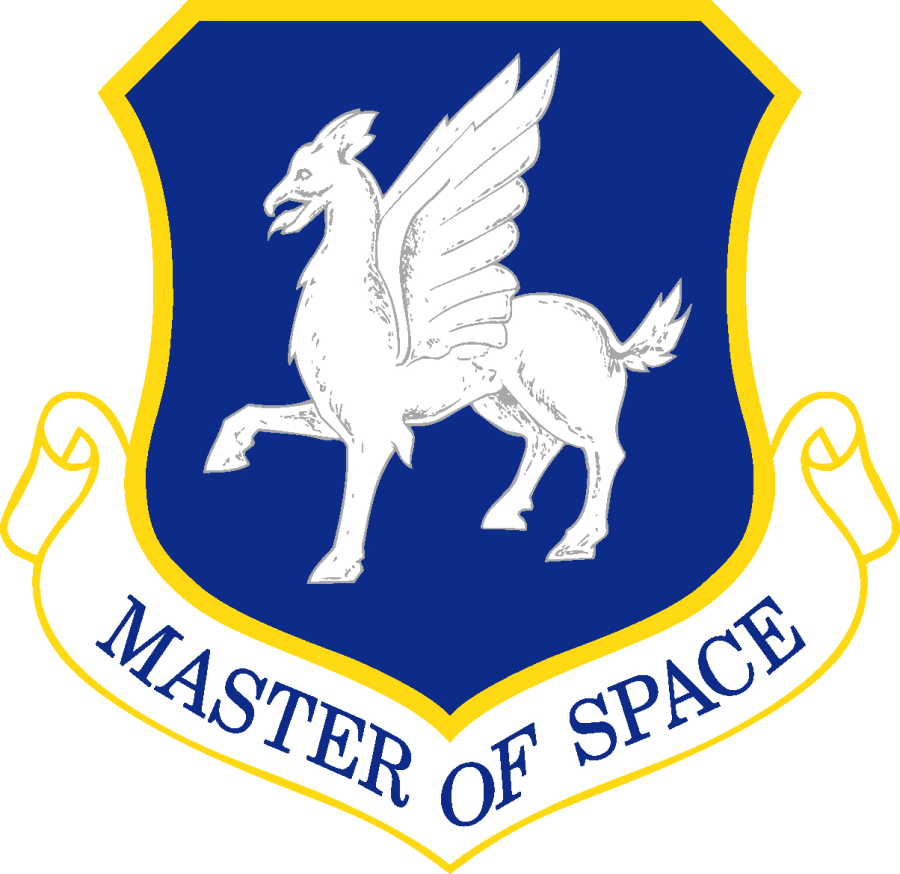
50th Space Wing shield

The 50th Space Wing shield was first approved for use on 15 July 1953, before being modified in 1956 and on 9 July 1992, and being approved in its final form on 27 July 2012. The blue background alludes to the vastness of space and the principal theater of the wing, while the yellow represents the sun and excellence required of its space professionals. The opinicus, with the strength of a lion and the bold flight of the eagle, symbolizes the functions of the 50th Space Wing. The motto of the 50th Space Wing, "Master of Space," was derived from the 50th Pursuit Group's motto "Master of Air" and approved in September 1992.

== History ==
=== 50th Fighter Wing (1949–1950) and 50th Fighter-Interceptor Wing (1950–1951) ===
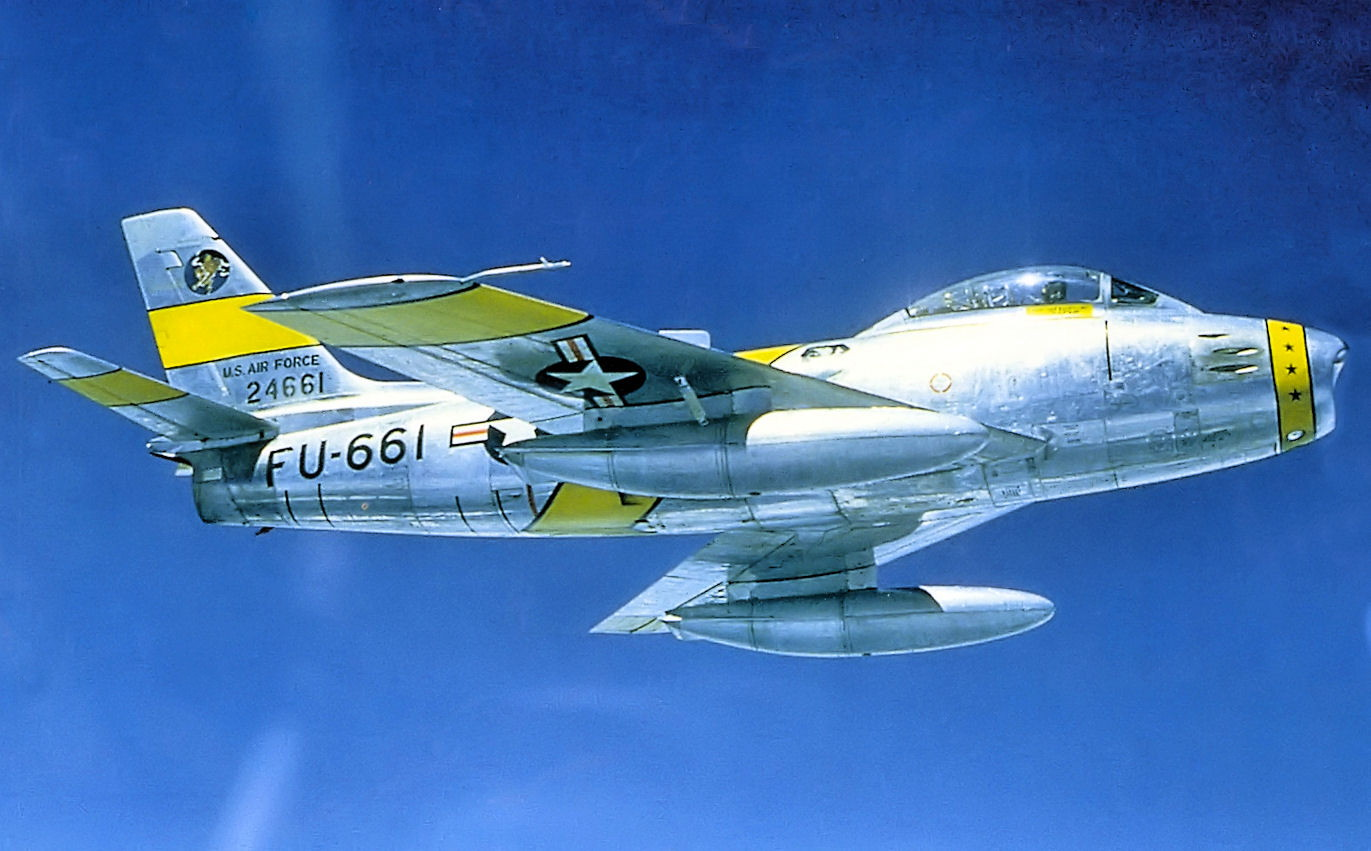
81st Fighter-Bomber Squadron North American F-86F Sabre in flight

On 1 June 1950, the 50th Fighter Wing (50 FW) was activated in the United States Air Force Reserve and operationally assigned to Tactical Air Command's First Air Force, supporting the active-duty 33rd Fighter Wing. It was stationed at Otis Air Force Base, Massachusetts, and consisted of the 50th Fighter Group, which included the 81st Fighter Squadron, 50th Air Base Group, and 50th Maintenance and Supply Group, which included the 50th Supply Squadron.

The 50th Fighter Wing was responsible for air defense on the eastern seaboard, flying the North American P-51 Mustang and Republic F-84 Thunderjet fighters, as well as the North American T-6 Texan and Lockheed T-33 Shooting Star trainers. In 1950, it started flying the North American F-86A Sabre fighter jet. On 1 March 1950, it was redesignated the 50th Fighter-Interceptor Wing (50 FIW), with the 50th Fighter Group also being redesignated the 50th Fighter-Interceptor Group and 81st Fighter Squadron also redesignated as the 81st Fighter-Interceptor Squadron. The 50th Fighter-Interceptor Wing, along with the 33rd Fighter-Interceptor Wing, were reassigned to Air Defense Command's Eastern Air Defense Force.

The advent of the Korean War resulted in a reevaluation of the posture of the American air forces. On 2 June 1951 the 50th Fighter-Interceptor Wing was inactivated, as part of an American realignment to support NATO forces in Europe to more directly counter the Soviet Union and Soviet Air Forces.

=== 50th Fighter-Bomber Wing (1953–1958) and 50th Tactical Fighter Wing (1958–1991) ===
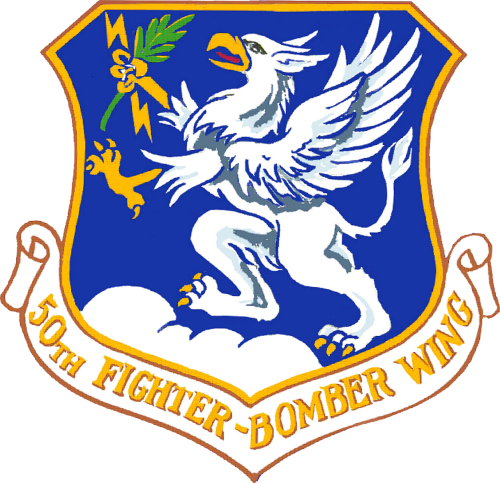
50th Fighter-Bomber Wing shield

On 1 January 1953, the 50th Fighter-Bomber Wing (50 FBW) was activated and assigned to Tactical Air Command's Ninth Air Force. Stationed at Clovis Air Force Base, New Mexico, the wing's operational component was the 50th Fighter-Bomber Group, which consisted of the 10th Fighter-Bomber Squadron and the 81st Fighter-Bomber Squadron. The wing initially flew F-51 Mustang fighters, before converting to the F-86F Sabre in 1953. The 50th Fighter-Bomber Wing's support elements included the 50th Air Base Group, the 50th Maintenance and Supply Group, and the 50th Medical Group, which was later redesignated as the 50th Tactical Hospital. The 50th Air Base Group consisted of the 50th Air Police Squadron (later redesignated the 50th Security Police Squadron) and 50th Civil Engineering Squadron (later redesignated the 50th Civil Engineer Squadron), while the 50th Maintenance and Supply Group consisted of the 50th Supply Squadron.

In summer 1953, the 50th Fighter-Bomber Wing was transferred to Europe, with much of the wing's personnel and equipment sailing across the Atlantic Ocean on the Military Sea Transportation Service's USNS General M. B. Stewart, while the aircrew flew across the North Atlantic. On 9 August 1953 it became part of United States Air Forces in Europe's Twelfth Air Force and was stationed at Hahn Air Base, Germany, where the wing assumed responsibility for the 7425th USAF Hospital from 1 May 1954 to 9 April 1956. The 50th Fighter-Bomber Wing also gained a third fighter-bomber squadron, assuming command of the 417th Fighter-Bomber Squadron and also became the first tactically operational wing in Twelfth Air Force.

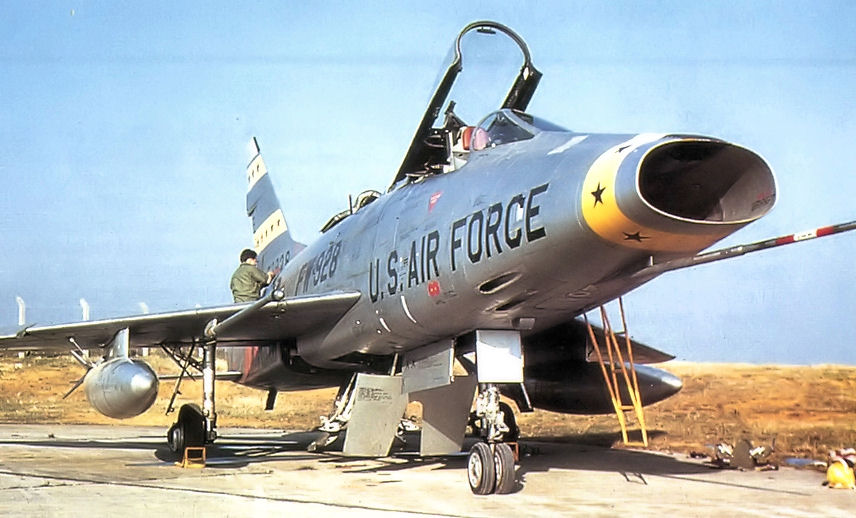
81st Tactical Fighter Squadron F-100D Super Sabre being serviced at Wheelus AB

Almost immediately after arriving in Germany, the 50th Fighter-Bomber Wing participated in Exercise Monte Carlo, which was designed to demonstrate NATO air defense force capabilities. In 1954, elements of the 50th Fighter-Bomber Wing spent six weeks at Wheelus Field, Libya, training in air-to-air and ground attack operations, scoring higher in both categories than any other unit in Twelfth Air Force. In 1955 the 21 FBW took top honors at the United States Air Forces in Europe aerial gunnery competition at Wheelus Field, and on 21 October 1955 it began to transition to the F-86H Sabre.

For brief period in 1955 and 1956, the 50th Fighter-Bomber Wing also flew the ET-33 trainer. On 14 March 1955, the 50th Fighter-Bomber Wing gained the 69th Pilotless Bomber Squadron, which operated the MGM-1 Matador cruise missile system. On 8 June 1955, the 69th Pilotless Bomber Squadron was redesignated the 69th Tactical Missile Squadron, and on 15 April 1956, left the 50th Fighter-Bomber Wing for the 7382d Guided Missile Group, which the 21 FBW provided support for.

On 15 April 1956, the 50th Fighter-Bomber Wing began to move to Toul-Rosières Air Base, France, fully transitioning by 1 August 1956. On 8 August 1956, the 50th Fighter-Bomber Wing assumed responsibility for the 7352d USAF Hospital, before relinquishing command on 25 September 1957. United States Air Forces in Europe then sent the 50th Fighter-Bomber Wing to represent it at the Air Force Fighter Weapons Meet at Nellis Air Force Base, Nevada. On 8 December 1957, the 50th Fighter-Bomber Group and 50th Maintenance and Supply Group were inactivated, with their squadrons reporting directly to the 21st Fighter-Bomber Wing. On 8 December, the 50th Field Maintenance Squadron activated. The 50th Field Maintenance Squadron would later be redesignated the 50th Consolidated Aircraft Maintenance Squadron, before reassuming its designation as the 50th Field Maintenance Squadron, and was later redesignated the 50th Equipment Maintenance Squadron, before finally being designated the 50th Maintenance Squadron. On 15 November 1958, the 50th Armament and Electronics Maintenance Squadron was activated, later being redesignated the 50th Avionics Maintenance Squadron, before finally being designated the 50th Component Repair Squadron. In 1957 and 1958, the 50th Fighter-Bomber Wing began transitioning to the North American F-100D Super Sabre. On 1 January 1958, the 50th Fighter-Bomber Wing was moved from Twelfth Air Force to directly report to United States Air Forces in Europe.

The 50th Fighter-Bomber Wing also had a number of Tactical Air Command squadrons temporarily attached to it, including the 428th Fighter-Bomber Squadron from 1 April 1957 to 1 October 1957, the 429th Fighter-Bomber Squadron from 7 October 1956 to 1 April 1957, the 430th Fighter-Bomber Squadron from 20 April 1956 to 7 October 1956, the 457th Fighter-Bomber Squadron from 20 March 1958 to 19 August 1958, and the 509th Fighter-Bomber Squadron from 15 January 1958 to 24 March 1958.

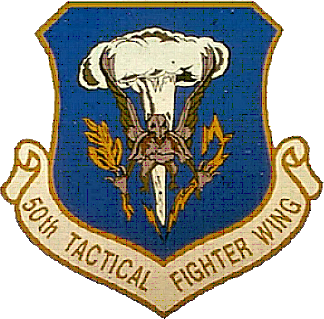
50th Tactical Fighter Wing Shield

On 8 July 1958, the 50th Fighter-Bomber Wing was redesignated as the 50th Tactical Fighter Wing (50 TFW). The redesignation from fighter-bomber to tactical fighter also affected its subordinate units, including the 10th Tactical Fighter Squadron, 81st Tactical Fighter Squadron, 417th Tactical Fighter Squadron, and the attached 457th Tactical Fighter Squadron. On 15 November 1959, the 50th Tactical Fighter Wing was reassigned from USAFE to the Seventeenth Air Force

On 1 September 1959, the 50th Tactical Fighter Wing began to transition back to Hahn Air Base, Germany, with the exception of the 417th Tactical Fighter Squadron, which was based at Ramstein Air Base, Germany. The 86th Fighter-Interceptor Wing's 496th Fighter-Interceptor Squadron, which flew the F-86D Sabre, was also attached to the 50th Tactical Fighter Wing under the duel-basing construct. In December 1959, the 496th Tactical Fighter Squadron began converting to Convair F-102 Delta Dagger interceptors. Due to the Cuban Missile Crisis and previous routine force movements, the 50th Tactical Fighter Wing had the 435th Tactical Fighter Squadron from Morón Air Base, Spain attached to it from 24 October 1962 to 11 December 1962, the 355th Tactical Fighter Squadron attached from 5 September 1961 to 16 November 1961, the 458th Tactical Fighter Squadron attached from 13 August 1958 to 18 February 1959, and the 614th Tactical Fighter Squadron attached from 5 September 1961 to 14 November 1961.

On 8 April 1952, the 50th Air Base Wing was redesignated as the 50th Combat Support Wing. In a reorganization of the wing's maintenance squadrons, the 50th Armament and Electronics Maintenance Squadron was briefly inactivated on 8 April 1962, but reactivated on 1 July 1964. Several new maintenance squadrons were activated on 1 July 1964, including the 50th Flightline Maintenance Squadron, although it was detached until 1 October 1965 and was inactivated shortly after on 25 December 1965, 50th Organizational Maintenance Squadron, although it was inactivated on 1 January 1966, and 350th Munitions Maintenance Squadron. On 1 October 1967, the 7236th Ammunition Supply Squadron was activated, augmenting the maintenance and operational fighter-bomber squadrons.

Following the resolution of the Cuban Missile Crisis, the 50th Tactical Fighter Wing resumed normal operations with its own three tactical fighter squadrons, participating in exercises with other NATO air forces. On 8 October 1966 the 10th Tactical Fighter Squadron, 81st Tactical Fighter Squadron, and 417th Tactical Fighter Squadron began converting from the F-100D Super Sabre to the McDonnell Douglas F-4D Phantom II tactical fighter, after the wing briefly operated the Lockheed F-104 Starfighter in 1962. During the conversion, the 417th Tactical Fighter Squadron remained assigned to the 50th Tactical Fighter Wing, but remained detached to the 86th Air Division at Ramstein Air Base.

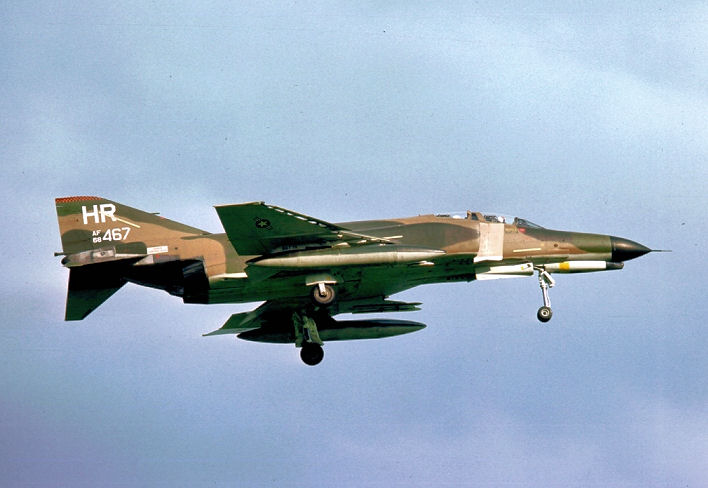
313th Tactical Fighter Squadron F-4E Phantom

On 1 July 1968, the 417th Tactical Fighter Squadron was removed from the 50th Tactical Fighter Wing, reassigned to Tactical Air Command's 67th Tactical Reconnaissance Wing at Mountain Home Air Force Base, Idaho. To replace the lost squadron, the 496th Fighter-Interceptor Squadron was permanently reassigned to the 50th Tactical Fighter Wing from the 86th Air Division on 1 November 1968 and redesignated the 496th Tactical Fighter Squadron. Initially it continued flying the F-102 Delta Dagger, but within two years upgraded to the F-4E Phantom II. Soon after, United States Air Forces in Europe selected the 81st Tactical Fighter Squadron to be the first to assume the Wild Weasel Suppression of Enemy Air Defenses mission set, equipping it with the Wild Weasel variant of the F-4E, and later the F-F-4G Wild Weasel V. On 12 June 1971, the 81st Tactical Fighter Squadron was moved to Zweibrücken Air Base, Germany and operationally subordinated to the 86th Tactical Fighter Wing, although it administratively remained part of the 50th Tactical Fighter Wing until it fully transitioned over on 15 July 1971. On 1 July 1971, USAF Hospital, Hahn, later designated as the 50th Tactical Fighter Wing Hospital was assigned to the wing.

In 1972 another round of reorganization to the wing's maintenance squadrons occurred. On 1 January 1972, the 50th Organizational Maintenance Squadron, later redesignated the 50th Aircraft Generation Squadron, was reactivated. On 1 April 1972, the 7501st Munitions Support Squadron, 7502d Munitions Support Squadron, 7503d Munitions Support Squadron, and 7504th Munitions Support Squadron were all activated. On 7 October 1972, the 350th Munitions Maintenance Squadron and 7236th Ammunition Supply Squadron inactivated, with the 50th Munitions Maintenance Squadron, later redesignated as the 50th Munitions Maintenance Squadron (Theater), and 50th Ammunition Supply Squadron activated on 8 October 1972 to replace them. the 7504th Munitions Support Squadron was inactivated on 1 September 1972, with the 7503d Munitions Support Squadron inactivating on 1 October 1972.

In 1975, the 10th Tactical Fighter Squadron began to utilize laser-guided dorms. It also hosted a number of attached Tactical Air Command squadrons, including the 8th Tactical Fighter Squadron from 8 March 1973 to 2 April 1973 and 6 September 1975 to 6 October 1975, 9th Tactical Fighter Squadron from 11 September 1971 to 7 October 1971 and 23 September 1976 to 24 October 1976, the 68th Tactical Fighter Squadron from 10 May 1977 to 7 June 1977, the 417th Tactical Fighter Squadron numerous times from 1968 to 1976, and the 421st Tactical Fighter Squadron from 5 August 1977 to 25 August 1977. The 50th Tactical Fighter Wing also hosted the first European deployment of Aerospace Defense Command fighters, hosting a detachment of six Convair F-106 Delta Dart interceptors from the 5th Fighter-Interceptor Squadron from 4 September 1975 to 25 September 1975.

In 1976, the 50th Tactical Fighter Wing began to fully convert its remaining squadrons to the F-4E Phantom II fighter and on 15 November 1976 it gained the newly activated 313th Tactical Fighter Squadron. The 50 TFW also began testing the Project Oriented Maintenance Organization for USAFE in 1977, testing the concept in the April 1978 Salty Rooster exercise. The success of the exercise resulted in the Project Oriented Maintenance Organization being rolled out across all of United States Air Forces in Europe. The 50 TFW also continued to exercise with allied partners, being the first U.S. Air Force unit to refuel with a KC-767 of the Imperial Iranian Air Force. The wing also activated the 7362d Munitions Support Squadron on 15 July 1976.

In 1978, United States Air Forces in Europe announced that the 50th Tactical Fighter Wing would be the first to test and field the General Dynamics F-16A Fighting Falcon, as well as its F-16B two-seater variant. The first F-16As arrived at Hahn Air Base on 19 April 1979 and began upgrading the airbase's facilities to accommodate the new aircraft. On 30 December 1981, the 313th Tactical Fighter Squadron accepted the 50 TFW's first operational F-16As, with the other squadrons following suit shortly and divesting the remaining F-4Es within six months. A number of changes to maintenance units happened in 1978, including the inactivation of the 50th Munitions Maintenance Squadron on 8 October 1978 and the activation of the 7015th Explosive Ordnance Disposal Flight on 1 October 1978.

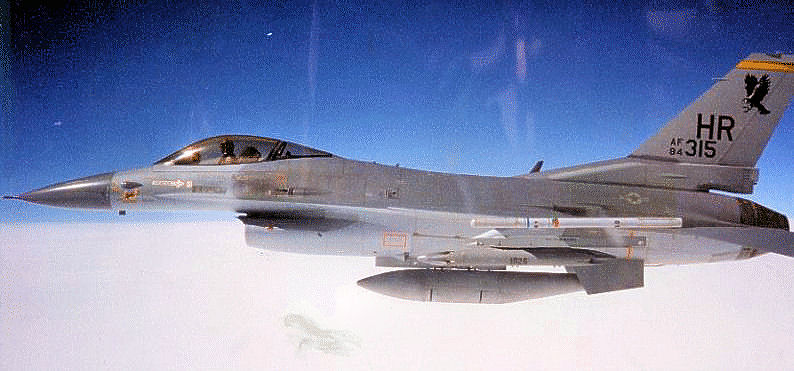
496th Tactical Fighter Squadron F-16C

The 50th Tactical Fighter Wing also participated in a NATO gala on 9 July 1982, marking NATO's adoption of the F-16, where it participated along with F-16s from the Royal Norwegian Air Force, Royal Netherlands Air Force, Belgian Air Force, Royal Danish Air Force, as well as other NATO air forces. 50th Tactical Fighter Wing F-16s frequently deployed to Zaragoza Air Base, Spain and Incirlik Air Base, Turkey to perform air-to-air and air-to-ground training to achieve full operational readiness, which was declared in April 1983. Shortly after, in July 1983, the 50th Tactical Fighter Wing participated in a USAFE Operational Readiness Inspection and NATO Organizational Tactical Evaluation, and in October 1983, took first place in the U.S. Air Force's Gunsmoke bombing and gunnery competition.

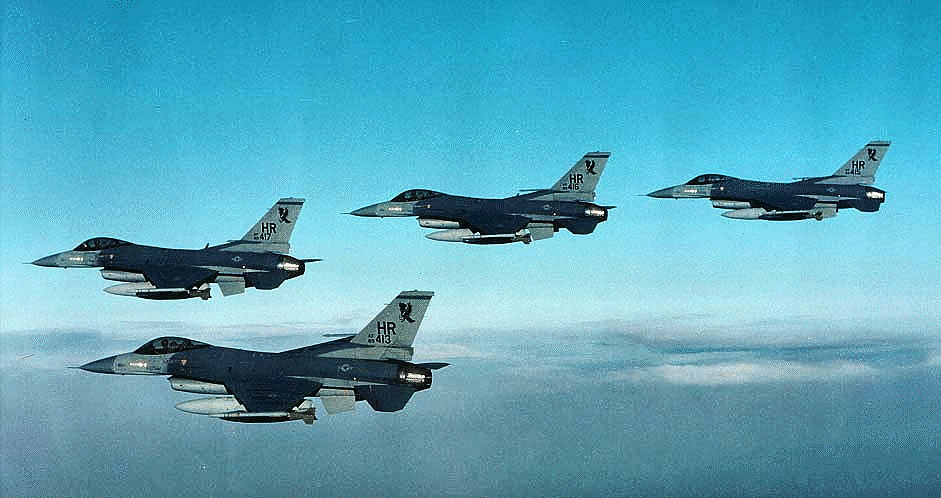
Group of four 10th Tactical Fighter Squadron F-16s in flight over Southwest Asia in 1991

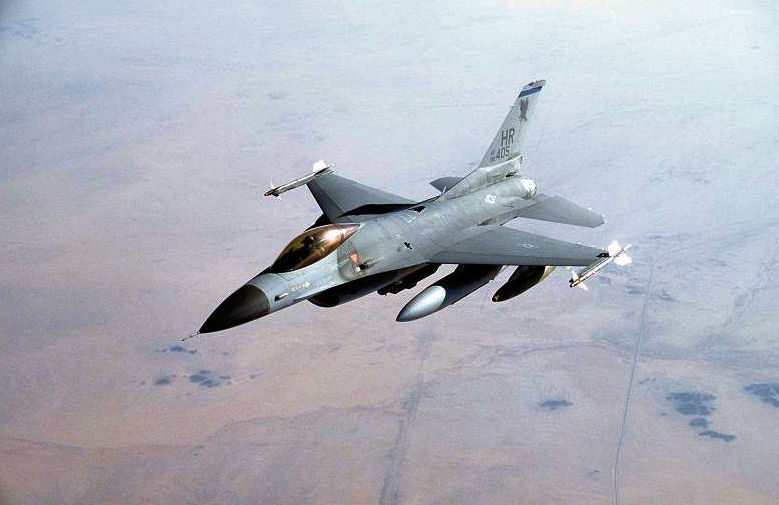
F-16C from the 10th tactical Fighter Squadron during the second wave of air attacks on Iraqi targets in support of Operation Desert Storm on 17 January 1991.

A number of changes to the 50th Combat Support Group and wing staff occurred in the 1980s and early 1990, with the 7150th Comptroller Squadron activating on 15 November 1983, before being inactivated and replaced by the newly established 50th Comptroller Squadron on 1 July 1985, the 50th Security Police Group activating on 21 October 1988, and 50th Support Squadron activating on 1 June 1989, and 2184th Communications Squadron activating on 1 October 1990. Maintenance squadrons also experienced structural changes, with the 7501st Munitions Support Squadron and 7502d Munitions Support Squadron inactivating on 15 November 1985, 7362d Munitions Support Squadron being inactivated on 1 January 1986, 50th Ammunition Supply Squadron being inactivated on 15 May 1986, being replaced by the reactivated 50th Munitions Maintenance Squadron, the 7015th Explosive Ordnance Disposal Flight being inactivated on 1 November 1986. The 50th Tactical Hospital was also inactivated on 1 July 1986.

In March 1984, the 50 TFW participated in the Green Flag exercise at Nellis Air Force Base, Nevada, engaging in realistic combat training and participated in NATO exercises, with two F-16As conducting landings and takeoffs on the German Autobahn highways. Between April and June 1984, 50 TFW units forward deployed to Ramstein Air Base, Spangdahlem Air Base, and Pferdsfeld Air Base due to repairs at Hahn Air Base. In 1986, the 50th Tactical Fighter Wing began replacing its F-16As and F-16Bs with the more advanced F-16Cs and F-16Ds, fully phasing out the first generation F-16s in less than a year. The 50th Tactical Fighter Wing also won the Daledalin Maintenance trophy in 1986 for both the numbered air force, major command, and air force level. It also won the Secretary of Defense's Phoenix Award for the best maintenance organization in the entire United States Department of Defense.

When Iraq executed its Invasion of Kuwait in 1991, the 50th Tactical Fighter Wing quickly mobilized its forces for deployment, sending the 10th Tactical Fighter Squadron and 30 F-16C Fighting Falcons as part of Operation Desert Shield on 29 December 1990. On 17 January 1991, 10th Tactical Fighter Squadron aircraft were among the first to strike Iraqi military positions as part of Operation Desert Storm, specifically bombing Al-Taqaddum Air Base, Iraq and gaining air supremacy over the Iraqi Air Force. The squadron was retasked to hunt down Scud missiles, which were striking coalition military targets and Israeli population centers. Throughout the entire campaign, the 10th Tactical Fighter Squadron had only lost one aircraft, with its pilot being taken as a prisoner of war. After hostilities ceased, 10 TFS forces enforced the ceasefire accords through combat air patrols.

Due to the fall of the Soviet Union, the United States and NATO began to draw down its high posture in Europe, resulting in the inactivation of the 50th Tactical Fighter Wing and closure of Hahn Air Base on 30 September 1991.

=== 50th Space Wing (1992–2020) ===
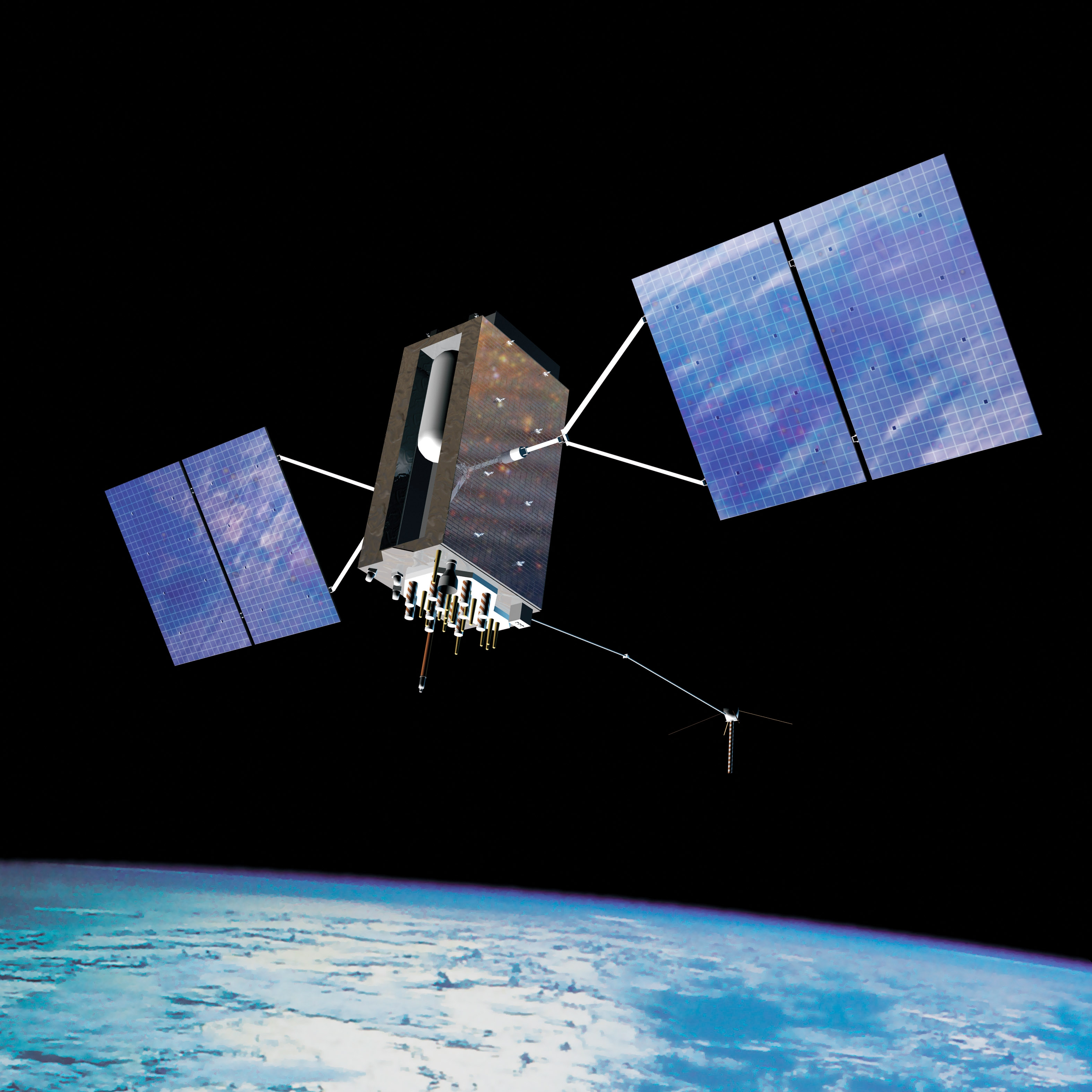
A Block IIIA GPS Spacecraft

On 30 January 1992, the 50th Space Wing (50 SW) was reactivated at Falcon Air Force Base, Colorado and assigned to Air Force Space Command. The 50th Space Wing replaced Air Force Space Command's 2nd Space Wing, flying its communications, navigation warfare, and space domain awareness spacecraft, as well as operating the Air Force Satellite Control Network and Global Broadcast Service. Replacing the 2nd Space Wing with the 50th Space Wing was part of a larger Air Force initiative designed to preserve early Air Force flying heritage, and bestowed upon the 50th Space Wing the history and honors of the World War II-era 50th Pursuit Group. On 20 September 1993, the 50th Space Wing was assigned to the Air Force Space Command's Fourteenth Air Force.

The 50th Operations Group served as the primary operations arm of the 50th Space Wing and operational units from the 2nd Space Wing were transferred to it, along with being redesignated from satellite control squadrons to space operations squadrons. Operations units included the 1st Space Operations Squadron, 2nd Space Operations Squadron, 3rd Space Operations Squadron, 4th Space Operations Squadron, 5th Space Operations Squadron, stationed at Onizuka Air Force Station, 50th Satellite Communications Squadron, 50th Crew Training Squadron, and 50th Operations Support Squadron. Spacecraft inherited from the 2nd Space Wing included the Defense Satellite Communications System II and Defense Satellite Communications System III constellations, the Defense Support Program missile warning constellation, the U.S. Navy's Fleet Satellite Communications System constellation, the Global Positioning System constellation, the NATO III and NATO IV satellite communications constellation, the British Armed Forces' Skynet satellite communications constellation, the U.S. Navy's Ultra High Frequency Follow-On satellite communications constellation.

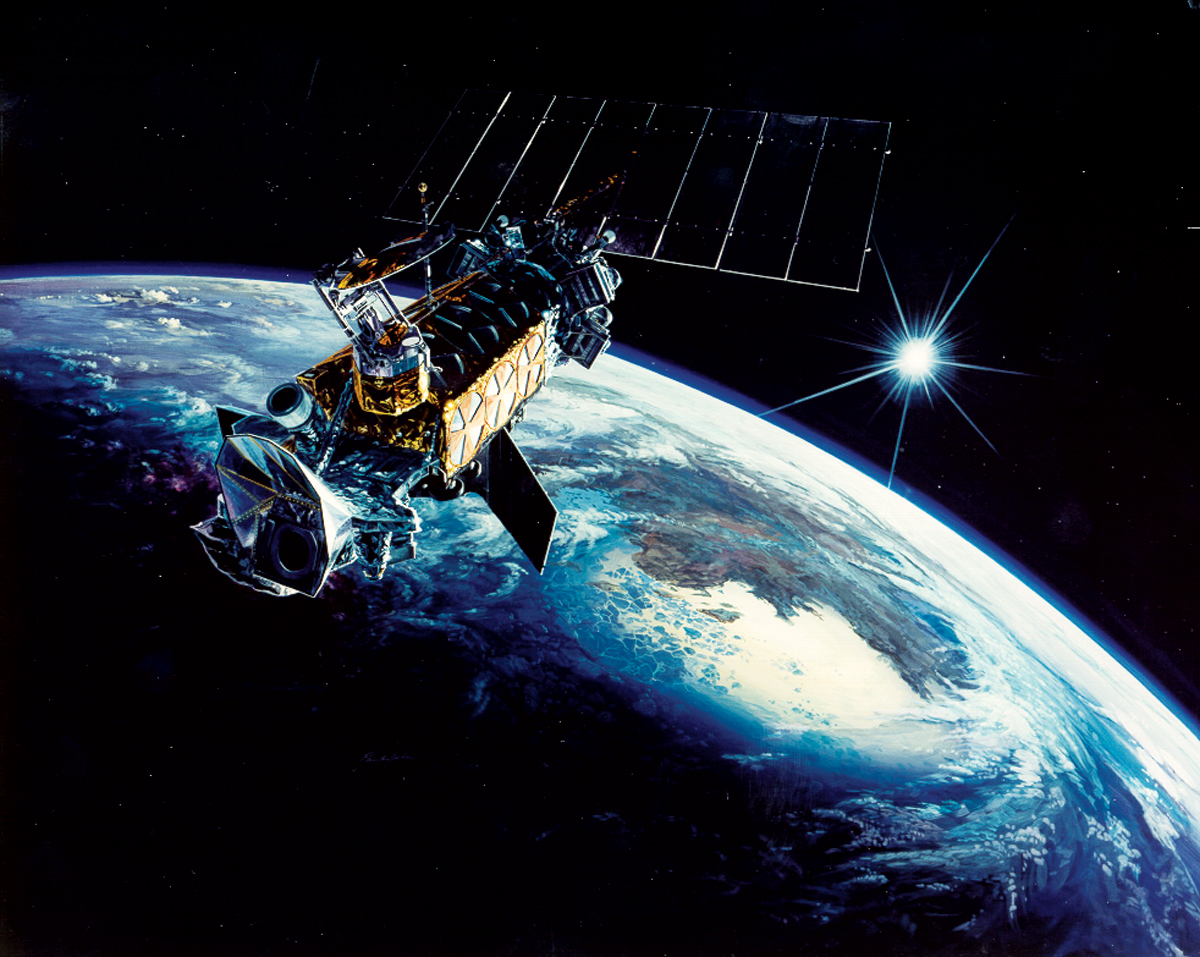
A Block V Defense Meteorological Support Program spacecraft

The 1000th Satellite Operations Group which flew the Defense Meteorological Support Program constellation, briefly served as an operational group of the 50th Space Wing, before being redesignated as the 6th Space Operations Squadron and moved under the 50th Operations Group on 31 July 1992. On 30 April 1992, the 4th Space Operations Squadron was activated to fly the Military Strategic and Tactical Relay (Milstar) communications satellite constellation. On 1 July 1992, the 50th Satellite Communications Squadron was redesignated as the 50th Space Communications Squadron.

The 750th Space Group, redesignated from its previous name as the 2nd Satellite Training Group with the activation of the 50th Space Wing, was stationed at Onizuka Air Force Station, was responsible for the operations of the Air Force Satellite Control Network and provided base support to the 5th Space Operations Squadron. Its operational elements consisted of the 21st Space Operations Squadron, 22nd Space Operations Squadron, 23rd Space Operations Squadron, stationed at New Boston Air Force Station, and 750th Operations Support Squadron. Installation support squadrons included the 750th Mission Support Squadron and 750th Logistics Support Squadron. On 1 October 1994, the 750th Medical Squadron was activated to provide medical support to personnel at Onizuka AFS.

The 50th Maintenance Group was activated to support the operations groups, consisting of the 50th Maintenance Squadron, 50th Logistics Support Squadron, and 50th Space Systems Squadron. The 50th Combat Support Squadron, responsible for installation support, consisted of the 50th Security Police Squadron, redesignated as the 50th Security Forces Squadron in 1997, 50th Civil Engineer Squadron, and 50th Support Squadron.

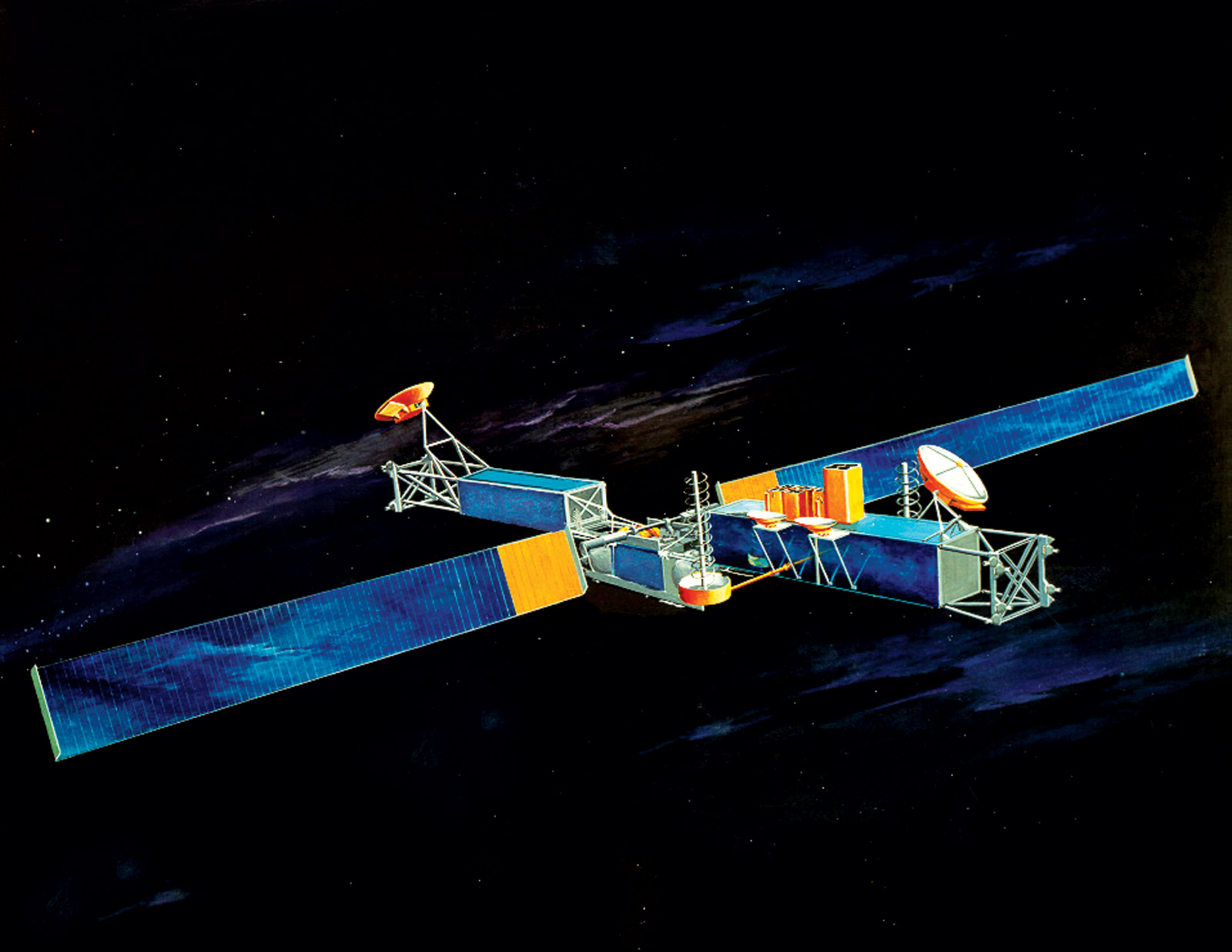
A Military Strategic and Tactical Relay spacecraft

The 50th Space Wing conducted several significant orbital operations in support of terrestrial forces. In February 1992, the 3rd Space Operations Squadron won Air Force Space Command's Space Support Trophy and in November 1992 flew a Fleet Satellite Communications System spacecraft from an orbit above the Pacific Ocean to one above the Atlantic Ocean, the longest transfer orbit in the squadron's history. 3 SOPS later transferred a Defense Satellite Communications System spacecraft from its orbit over Europe to over Somalia, providing space support for the United Nations' Unified Task Force. These operations led to the 50th Space Wing winning United States Space Command's Herres Award. In 1994, the 50th Space Wing assumed full responsibility for the Global Positioning System from the Space and Missile Systems Center and the 4th Space Operations Squadron officially accepted Milstar on 15 November 1994.

On 1 October 1994, the 50th Crew Training Squadron was inactivated, with its space training functions transferred to Air Education and Training Command's 534th Training Squadron, organized under the 381st Training Group at Vandenberg Air Force Base. On the same date, the 50th Weather Squadron was activated and gained responsibility for monitoring space weather from the Air Force Space Forecast Center. On 14 August 1995, the 50th Contracting Squadron was activated under the 50th Combat Support Group. In 1996, the 50th Space Wing turned over full operations of the Fleet Satellite Communications System to the Naval Satellite Operations Center.

The wing began a series of reorganizations beginning in 1997, inactivating the 50th Maintenance Group, 50th Maintenance Squadron, and 50th Logistics Support Squadron on 1 December 1997. On the same day, the 50th Communications Group was activated to replace the 50th Maintenance Group's space support activities. Prior to the inactivation of the 50th Maintenance Group, the 50th Space Support Squadron was briefly inactivated on 23 June 1997, before being reactivated as the 850th Communications Squadron. The 50th Space Communications Squadron was redesignated the 50th Communications Squadron and transferred from the 50th Operations Group which, along with the 850th Communications Squadron, were assigned to the 50th Communications Group. On 6 March 1997, the 55th Space Weather Squadron replaced the 50th Space Weather Squadron, before itself inactivating on 1 October 1999. In June 1997, the 50th Space Wing began to consolidate its activities at Falcon AFB, reducing its presence at Onizuka Air Force Station, Fairchild Air Force Base, and Offutt Air Force Base. As part of this drawdown, the 750th Operations Support Squadron was inactivated on 23 June 1997 and the 750th Logistics Support Squadron was inactivated on 5 November 1997.

In On 5 June 1998, the 50th Space Wing renamed Falcon Air Force Base to Schriever Air Force Base, and began building a new satellite control facility, intending to transfer all functions from Onizuka AFS and shut down the base . It also closed the Defense Meteorological Support Program satellite operations centers at Fairchild AFB and Offutt AFB and transferred it to Suitland, Maryland, where the National Oceanic and Atmospheric Administration was establishing a new DMSP satellite operations facility. The DMSP was relinquished to NOAA later that year, resulting in the inactivation of the 6th Space Operations Squadron on 30 September 1998. The 8th Space Operations Squadron, a reserve unit, was activated to support NOAA operations of the DMSP and serve as the back-up satellite operations center at Schriever AFB. 8 SOPS began operations in September 1998, but was replaced by Air Force Reserve Command with a reactivated 6th Space Operations Squadron on 1 October 1998.

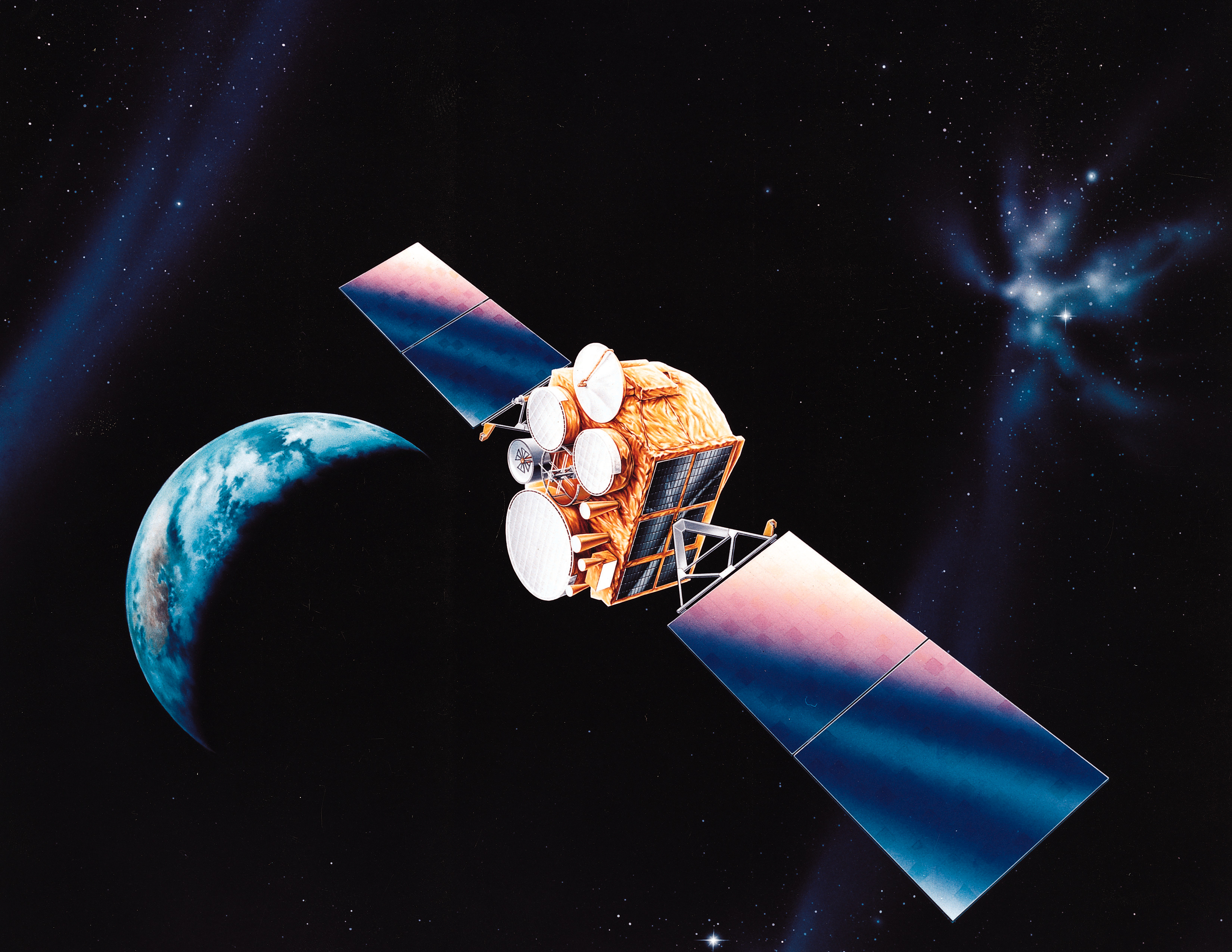
A Defense Satellite Communications System III spacecraft

On 21 October 1998, the 5th Space Operations Squadron placed the last Defense Satellite Communications System II spacecraft in a super synchronous orbit, retiring the system. In December 1998, the 1st Space Operations Squadron began to support the Ballistic Missile Defense Organization's Midcourse Space Experiment, which it assumed full control of on 1 October 2000.

On 25 June 1999, the 750th Space Group was inactivated, following the inactivation of the 750th Mission Support Squadron on 3 May 1999 and 750th Medical Squadron on 28 May 1999 due to the 1995 Defense Base Closure and Realignment Commission's recommendations to reduce presence at Onizuka AFS, leaving the 21st Space Operations Squadron as the host squadron for the base. The 50th Operations Group assumed responsibility for the 5th Space Operations Squadron, which was inactivated on 13 June 2000, the 21st Space Operations Squadron, the 22nd Space Operations Squadron, and the 23rd Space Operations Squadron.

On 10 February 2000, the 3rd Space Operations Squadron turned over operational control of the Ultra High Frequency Follow-On to the United States Navy's Naval Satellite Operations Center. On 11 October 2000, the Space Shuttle Discovery experienced a Ku-band antenna failure while flying STS-92. The 21st Space Operations Squadron provided communications support for the shuttle mission, relaying information to NASA mission control.

In response to the September 11 attacks, the United States and NATO forces initiated Operation Enduring Freedom. The 50th Space Wing provided satellite communications, global positioning system enhancements, and deployed personnel to support counterterrorism operations. During Operation Iraqi Freedom, the 50th Space Wing had on average 80 space operators deployed to forward operating bases in the Middle East. During the initial allied invasion of Iraq, the 2nd Space Operations Squadron developed new techniques for enhancing Global Positioning System accuracy over the Iraqi theater of operations, with the 3rd Satellite Operations Squadron and 4th Satellite Operations Squadron maximized communications coverage of the theater. The 1st Space Operations Squadron also set a new record for placing a GPS spacecraft in orbit and completing all early on-orbit checkout activities in 11 days, while also providing Defense support Program and GPS support. 3 SOPS' Defense Satellite Communications System Block III provided 80% of bandwidth for allied forces in theater, while 4 SOPS dedicated 85% of Milstar communications capacity to support tactical forces.

On 1 October 2002, the 50th Communications Group was inactivated, being briefly replaced by the 50th Maintenance Group, until the maintenance group was inactivated and communications group reactivated on 1 June 2003. On 1 October 2002, the 50th Communications Squadron was redesignated as the 50th Space Communications Squadron and 850th Communications Squadron redesignated as 850th Space Communications Squadron. On 10 March 2004, the 50th Communications Group was redesignated as the 50th Network Operations Group and given responsibility for the Air Force Satellite Control Network from the 50th Operations Group, with the 21st Space Operations Squadron, 22nd Space Operations Squadron, and 23rd Space Operations Squadron transferred to it. On 30 January 2006, the 850th Space Communications Squadron had its functions merged into the 50th Space Communications Squadron upon the 850 SCS's inactivation.

On 1 October 2002, the 50th Combat Support Group was redesignated the 50th Mission Support Group and the 50th Support Squadron was redesignated the 50th Mission Support Squadron. On 1 October 2003, the 50th Comptroller Squadron was activated, reporting directly to 50th Space Wing headquarters. On 1 June 2003, the 50th Logistics Readiness Flight, formerly the 50th Supply Squadron, was reactivated and assigned to the 50th Mission Support Group. On 20 June 2008, the 50th Mission Support Squadron was redesignated as the 50th Force Support Squadron.

On 3 September 2004, the 3rd Space Operations Squadron ceased operating the NATO III, NATO IV, and Skynet satellite systems and on 31 August 2006, the 1st Space Operations Squadron turned over operations of the Defense Support Program constellation to the 460th Space Wing's 2nd Space Warning Squadron. On 11 April 2008, the 3rd Space Operations Squadron accepted the first Wideband Global SATCOM spacecraft.

On 15 September 2011, the 21st Space Operations Squadron transitioned to Vandenberg Air Force Base's Ellison Onizuka Space Operations Facility and Onizuka Air Force Station closed. On 16 July 2008, the 1st Space Operations Squadron decommissioned and disposed of the Midcourse Space Experiment. In March 2009, the 21st Space Operations Squadron provided communications support for the Space Shuttle Discovery during STS-119.

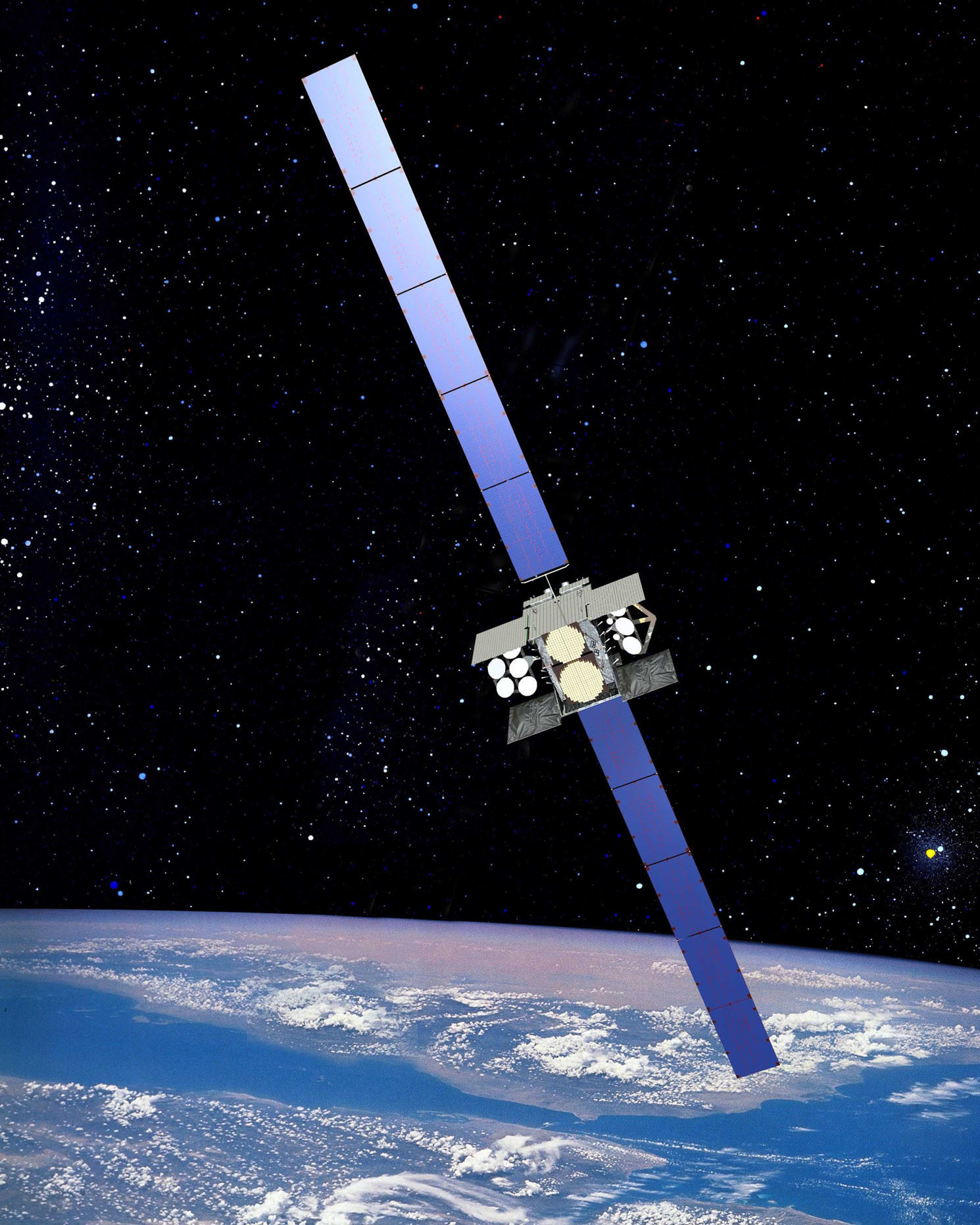
A Wideband Global SATCOM spacecraft

1 SOPS assumed responsibility for TacSat-3, the Space Based Space Surveillance system, and the Operationally Responsive Space-1 spacecraft in 2010, retiring TACSAT-3 in 2012 and ORS-1 in 2017.

In 2010, the 50th Space Wing regained responsibility for the Defense Meteorological Support Program, standing up Detachment 1, 50th Operations Group at Suitland, Maryland. On 12 March 2012, 4 SOPS assumed satellite control authority for Advanced Extremely High Frequency-1. On 21 February 2011, the 50th Space Wing gained control authority for the Space Based Space Surveillance satellite.

On 1 April 2013, the Space Innovation and Development Center was inactivated, resulting in the 50th Space Wing gaining the 3rd Space Experimentation Squadron. On 29 September 2015, the Geosynchronous Space Situational Awareness Program was transferred to the 1st Space Operations Squadron. The 50th Space Wing operated a number of other experimental systems, including the Boeing X-37B Orbital Test Vehicle, Automated Navigation and Guidance Experiment for Local Space (ANGELS) from 2016 to 2017, and ORS-5 and the Evolved Expendable Launch Vehicle Secondary Payload Adapter Augmented Geosynchronous Laboratory Experiment (EAGLE) in 2018. On 13 June 2017, the 3 Space Operations Squadron was inactivated, merging its functions into 4 SOPS. 4 SOPS provided communications support to hurricane relief efforts.

On 20 December 2019, the 50th Space Wing, along with the rest of Air Force Space Command, was transferred to the United States Space Force and on 19 June 2020, the 750th Operations Group was activated, centralizing orbital warfare functions represented by the 1st Space Operations Squadron, 3rd Space Experimentation Squadron, and 750th Operations Support Squadron under a single group. On 24 July 2020, the 50th Space Wing was inactivated for a final time, being replaced by the Peterson-Schriever Garrison. Its units were divided between Space Delta 6, which is responsible for cyberspace operations and replaced the 50th Network Operations Group, Space Delta 8, which is responsible for satellite communications and navigation warfare and replaced the 50th Operations Group, and Space Delta 9, which is responsible for orbital warfare and replaced the 750th Operations Group.

== List of commanders ==
No.	Commander		Term		
No.	Portrait	Name	Took office	Left office	Duration
1	Roger G. DeKok	Brigadier General; Roger G. DeKok	30 January 1992	17 June 1993	1 year, 138 days
2	Gregory L. Gilles	Colonel; Gregory L. Gilles	17 June 1993	4 November 1994	1 year, 140 days
3	Simon P. Worden	Colonel; Simon P. Worden	4 November 1994	22 March 1996	1 year, 139 days
4	Glen W. Moorhead III	Brigadier General; Glen W. Moorhead III	22 March 1996	25 April 1997	1 year, 34 days
5	Elwood C. Tircuit	Colonel; Elwood C. Tircuit	25 April 1997	9 June 1999	2 years, 45 days
6	Richard E. Webber	Colonel; Richard E. Webber	9 June 1999	20 April 2001	1 year, 315 days
7	Larry D. James	Colonel; Larry D. James	20 April 2001	7 February 2003	1 year, 293 days
-	Michael D. Selva	Colonel; Michael D. Selva; Acting	7 February 2003	9 June 2003	122 days
8	Suzanne M. Vautrinot	Colonel; Suzanne M. Vautrinot	9 June 2003	4 April 2005	1 year, 299 days
9	John E. Hyten	Colonel; John E. Hyten	4 April 2005	15 May 2006	1 year, 41 days
-	James C. Hutto Jr.	Colonel; James C. Hutto Jr. Acting	15 May 2006	14 October 2006	152 days
9	John E. Hyten	Colonel; John E. Hyten	14 October 2006	22 May 2007	220 days
10	Teresa A.H. Djuric	Colonel; Teresa A.H. Djuric	22 May 2007	12 June 2008	1 year, 21 days
11	Cary C. Chun	Colonel; Cary C. Chun	12 June 2008	20 August 2009	1 year, 69 days
12	Wayne Monteith	Colonel; Wayne Monteith	20 August 2009	5 August 2011	1 year, 350 days
13	James P. Ross	Colonel; James P. Ross	5 August 2011	11 July 2013	1 year, 340 days
14	William J. Liquori Jr.	Colonel; William J. Liquori Jr.	11 July 2013	29 May 2015	1 year, 322 days
15	DeAnna M. Burt	Colonel; DeAnna M. Burt	29 May 2015	30 June 2017	2 years, 32 days
16	Jennifer L. Grant	Colonel; Jennifer L. Grant	30 June 2017	24 June 2019	1 year, 359 days
17	James E. Smith	Colonel; James E. Smith	24 June 2019	24 July 2020	1 year, 30 days
