= 22nd Space Operations Squadron =

United States Space Force unit

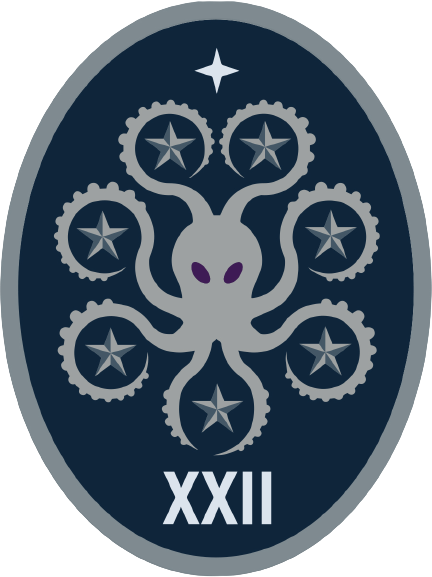
- Active: October 1, 1991 – present
- Country: United States
- Branch: United States Space Force
- Type: Space operations
- Role: Satellite command and control
- Part of: Mission Delta 31
- Home base: Schriever Space Force Base
- Nickname: Pathfinders to the Stars
- Mottos: "Conectens caeli terraque" (Latin for "Connecting land and air")
- Equipment: Satellite Control Network
- Decorations: Air Force Outstanding Unit Award

Commanders
- Current commander: Lt Col Jean Purgason

Insignia
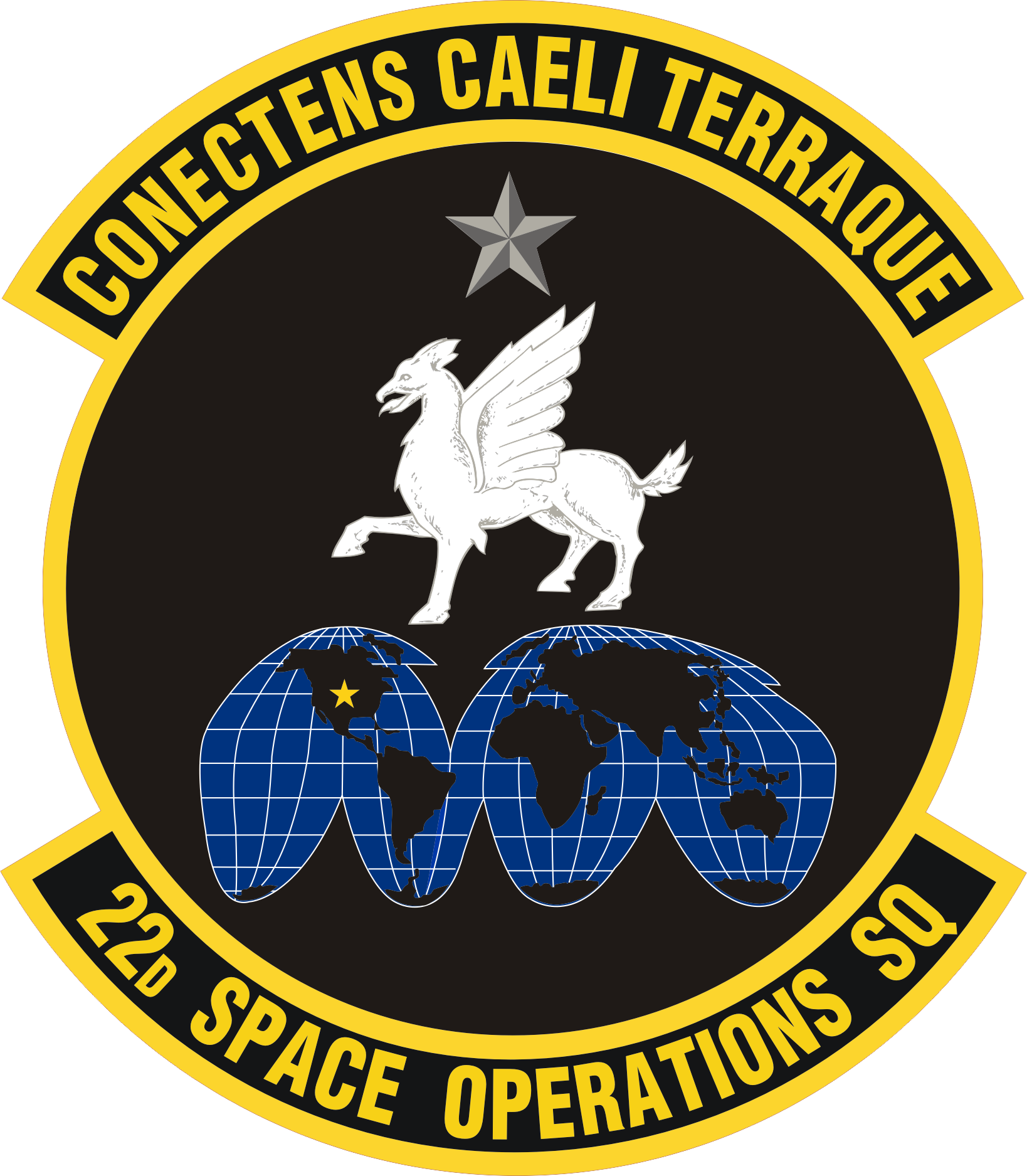
- Previous emblem

The 22d Space Operations Squadron is a satellite control unit of the United States Space Force. It is part of Mission Delta 31 and is located at Schriever Space Force Base, Colorado. Prior to October 2024 it was part of Space Delta 6. Prior to July 2020 it was part of the 50th Network Operations Group, itself a part of the 50th Space Wing.

== Mission and operations ==
The 22nd Space Operations Squadron (22nd SOPS) operates the Satellite Control Network (SCN) by developing, executing and enforcing the Space Access Tasking Order (SpATO) and providing space safety analysis to conduct satellite operations. The 22nd SOPS coordinates the launch and on-orbit operations of more than 190 Department of Defense, national intelligence, civil and Allied nation's satellites, including in support of global warfighters, intelligence community users, the President and Secretary of Defense.

The 22nd SOPS's Operations Center at Schriever Space Force Base, Colorado, develops, publishes and enforces the SpATO, and directs and monitors all aspects of enterprise operations for SCN users through a combination of military commanders, civilian professionals and contract support. The squadron's orbit analysts coordinate ephemeris data, launch and early orbit analysis determination, and tracking station look angles to support space operations for some 29 different space operations centers.

The 22nd SOPS also provides a limited predictive and investigative radio frequency interference and collision avoidance capability to all SCN users. It also implements defensive counter-space actions to ensure continued "access to space" and protect the ability to create "space effects".

The unit staffing consisted of officers, enlisted, DOD civilians and contractor personnel performing SCN operations and maintenance 24/7 around the globe.

== History ==
Constituted 22d Space Operations Squadron on 10 July 1991, it was activated on 1 Oct 1991. It operated as part of the 2d Satellite Tracking (later, 750th Space) Group.

In 1992 the Thule Tracking Station (TTS, 76°30′57″N 68°36′0″W) near Thule Air Base in Greenland transferred to Detachment 3, 22nd Space Operations Squadron. It was originally the 6594th Test Wing's Operating Location 5 made operational in 1961-62. The installation was a Remote Tracking Station (callsign: Polar Orbiting Geophysical Observatory (POGO)) of the U.S. Space Force's Satellite Control Network. It includes a "fully equipped mini-fitness center". The stations "C-side" of electronics was removed in summer 2011 and the upgrade to an Automated Remote Tracking Station was forecast to be completed in 2015.

In 2004 the squadron was transferred from being under the 50th Operations Group to the 50th Network Operations Group. The 50th Network Operations Group brought together all the 50th Space Wing's squadrons responsible for Air Force Satellite Control Network operations and maintenance as well as communications.

As part of 22 SOPS, the Colorado Tracking Station enjoyed a unique status as the only on-base satellite tracking facility. Originally built in the late 1980s, the station underwent a number of upgrades. In late 2006, the station was scheduled to receive a new equipment core, which would have allowed further automation of the satellite operations. The new core, part of the Remote Tracking Station Block Change, includes computer processor upgrades, and new hardware/software to allow the tracking station equipment to better interface with the upgraded satellite operations centers. This system also involves a 13-meter diameter, 3-axis antenna. This new antenna adds the capability to track low earth orbiting satellites "over the top".

The squadron operates several detachments broken out in two zones containing at tracking stations around the globe, each forming part of the Satellite Control Network.

SCN EAST

- Detachment 3: Thule Tracking Station (POGO), near Pituffik Space Base, Greenland
- Detachment 6: New Boston Tracking Station (BOSS), New Hampshire
- OL-A: Eastern Vehicle Checkout Facility (EVCF), Cape Canaveral SFS, Florida
- OL-AE: Telemetry and Command Station (LION), RAF Oakhanger, United Kingdom

SCN WEST

- Detachment 1: Vandenberg Tracking Station (COOK), Vandenberg Air Force Base, California.
- Detachment 2: Diego Garcia Tracking Station (REEF), Diego Garcia, British Indian Ocean Territory
- Detachment 4: Hawaii Tracking Station (HULA), Kaena Point Satellite Tracking Station, Hawaii
- Detachment 5: Guam Tracking Station (GUAM), Guam

Beginning October 1, 2006, the Colorado Tracking Station began reduced operations, owing to "fiscal constraints".

On Nov. 1, 2010, command of six of the squadron’s seven remote tracking stations was transferred to the 21st Space Operations Squadron (Vandenberg, Diego Garcia, Hawaii and Guam) and 23rd Space Operations Squadron (Thule, Oakhanger and the Eastern Vehicle Checkout Facility). On July 16, 2012, operations at the Colorado Tracking Station ceased.

The squadron was realigned to Space Delta 6 of the United States Space Force on 24 July 2020.

The squadron was realigned under Mission Delta 31 of the United States Space Force on 15 October 2024

== Lineage ==
- Constituted as the 22d Space Operations Squadron on 10 July 1991

Activated on 1 October 1991

=== Assignments ===
- 2d Satellite Tracking Group (later 750th Space Group)
- 50th Operations Group, June 1999
- 50th Network Operations Group, March 2004 – 24 July 2020
- Space Delta 6, 24 July 2020 – 15 October 2024
- Mission Delta 31, 15 October 2024 - Present

=== Stations ===
- Schriever Space Force Base, Colorado, 1 October 1991 – present

=== Awards ===
- The Aldridge Trophy 1996 (Guardian Challenge)
- Outstanding Unit Awards:
  - September 1990 – August 1991
  - September 1993 – August 1995
  - October 1998 – September 2000
  - October 2000 – September 2001
  - October 2001 – October 2002
  - October 2002 – October 2003

== List of commanders ==
- Lt Col William Fruland, June 1990
- Lt Col Tom Muckenthaler, June 1992
- Lt Col Dave Arnold, ~Jul 2007
- Lt Col Steven Staats, 1 Feb 2008
- Lt Col Eric Dorminey, 5 August 2009
- Lt Col William Angerman, 6 July 2011
- Lt Col Aaron Gibson, June 2013
- Lt Col Terrill McCall, June 2015
- Lt Col Lewis Sorvillo, 6 July 2017
- Lt Col Sunil Amin, ~2018
- Lt Col Brendon Herbeck, 9 June 2020
- Lt Col Jaime Garcia, 16 June 2022
- Lt Col Jean Purgason, 20 July 2024 - Present
