= Space Base Delta 2 =

US Space Force unit

- Delta emblem
- Active: 1985-1992, 2020-present
- Country: United States
- Branch: United States Space Force
- Type: Delta
- Part of: United States Space Force Combat Forces Command
- Headquarters: Buckley Space Force Base, Aurora, Colorado, U.S.
- Motto: "First in Space Operations"
- Decorations: Air Force Outstanding Unit Award
- Website: www.buckley.spaceforce.mil

Commanders
- Commander: Col Eamon R. Murray
- Vice Commander: Col David M. Knight
- Senior Enlisted Leader: CMSgt Marlene Locks

Insignia
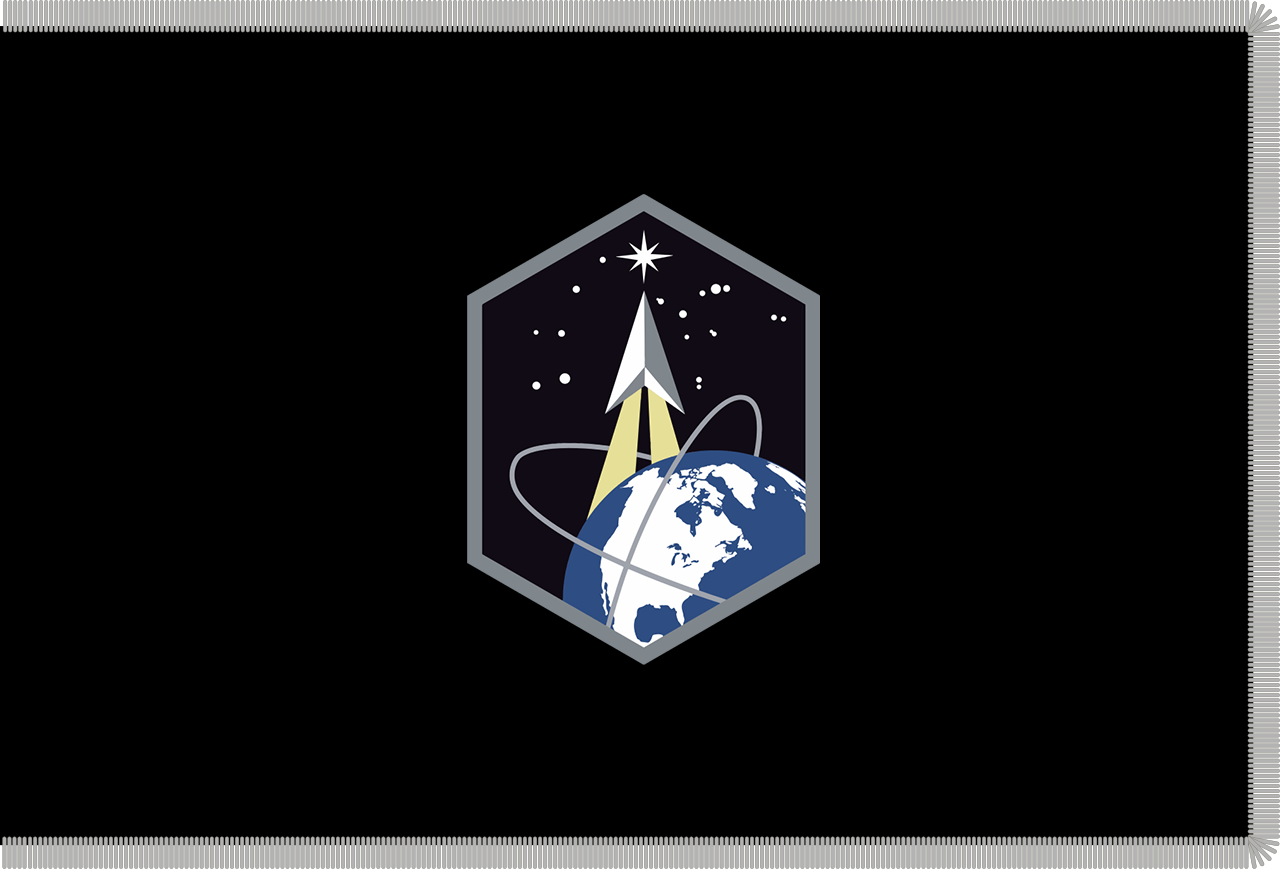
- SPACE BASE DELTA 2 FLAG

Space Base Delta 2 (SBD 2) is a unit in the United States Space Force. It is assigned to Space Force Combat Forces Command and headquartered at Buckley Space Force Base in Aurora, Colorado, United States.

SBD 2 is responsible for providing installation support functions for the resident air operations, space-based missile warning capabilities, space surveillance operations, and space communications missions at Buckley Space Force Base in Colorado, Cape Cod Space Force Station in Massachusetts, Cavalier Space Force Station in North Dakota, and Clear Space Force Station in Alaska. It also provides Airmen and Guardians that deploy and are deployed in-place, to accomplish warfighting missions globally.

The delta hosts six major base partners: Space Delta 4 (Missile Warning Delta), 140th Wing of the Colorado Air National Guard (COANG); the Denver Navy Reserve Center, the Aerospace Data Facility-Colorado, the Army Aviation Support Facility, and the Air Reserve Personnel Center.

The garrison and delta traces its heritage to the 2d Space Wing. Constituted on 5 December 1984 and activated on 8 July 1985, the 2d Space Wing was the host wing at Falcon Air Force Station (later Falcon Air Force Base, then Schriever Air Force Base, now Schriever Space Force Base). It took operational control of the Air Force Satellite Control Network in October 1987. It was inactivated on 30 January 1992 when the 50th Space Wing replaced it.

The 2d Space Wing was redesignated as Buckley Garrison on 23 July 2020. and activated on 24 July 2020 (from elements, personnel, and resources of the 460th Space Wing). On May 23, 2022, Buckley Garrison was redesignated Space Base Delta 2.

Its current commander is Colonel Eamon R. Murray.

== Assignments ==
- Air Force Space Command (5 December 1984 – 30 January 1992)
- HQ United States Space Force (24 July 2020 – 21 October 2020)
- HQ Space Operations Command (21 October 2020 – present)

== Components ==
=== Wing Units, 1985-1992 ===
- 1st Manned Spaceflight Control Squadron (1 Dec 1985 – 30 Jun 1989)
- 1st Satellite Control Squadron (5 Oct 1987 – 30 Jan 1992)
- 2d Satellite Control Squadron (1 Oct 1985 – 30 Jan 1992)
- 3d Satellite Control Squadron (2 Feb 1990 – 30 Jan 1992)
- 2d Satellite Tracking Group (1 Oct 1987 – 30 Jan 1992)
- 1000th Satellite Operations Group (1 Apr 1986 – 30 Jan 1992)
- 1002d Space Support Group (1 Oct 1985 – 30 Jan 1992)
  - 2d Special Security Squadron (15 Aug 1985 – 15 Oct 1986)
  - 1002d Civil Engineering Squadron (1 Oct 1989 − 30 Jan 1992)
  - 1002d Security Police Squadron (formerly 1002d Special Security Squadron) (15 Oct 1986 – 14 Nov 1986)
  - 1002d Space Systems Squadron (formerly 1002d Space Systems Support Squadron) (1 Oct 1985 – 30 Jan 1992)
  - 1022d Combat Crew Training Squadron (1 Jun 1990 – 30 Jan 1992)
- 1879th Communications Group (1 Oct 1990 – 30 Jan 1992)

=== Delta Units, 2020-present ===
The delta is composed of the following units:

- 460th Comptroller Squadron (460 CPTS)
- 460th Medical Group (460 MDG)
  - 460th Healthcare Operations Squadron (460 HCOS)
  - 460th Operational Medical Readiness Squadron (460 OMRS)
- 460th Civil Engineer Squadron (460 CES)
- 460th Contracting Squadron (460 CONS)
- 460th Force Support Squadron (460 FSS)
- 460th Logistics Readiness Squadron (460 LRS)
- 460th Security Forces Squadron (460 SFS)
- Information Technology Flight (SBD 2/ITF)

== Stations ==
- Falcon Air Force Station (later Base, now Schriever Air Force Base), Colorado (5 December 1984 – 30 January 1992)
- Buckley Space Force Base (formerly Buckley Air Force Base), Colorado (24 July 2020 – present)

== Decorations ==
- Air Force Outstanding Unit Award
  - 1 December 1987 – 30 November 1989.
  - 1 September 1990 – 31 August 1991.
- Air and Space Outstanding Unit Award
  - 1 January 2021 – 31 December 2022.

== Emblem ==
Space Base Delta 2's current emblem was approved on 2 March 2022. It incorporates design elements from its former Air Force emblem, e.g. the delta with contrail, the globe, the constellation of stars.

=== Description ===
On a black vertically elongated hexagon, a white and gray delta in flight generating a pair of antique white rays from underneath surmounted by blue terrestrial globe, landmass in white, emerging from the bottom right corner and encircled by a pair of silver orbital rings; to the left and right of the delta the constellations of Aquila and Ursa Minor and above all a polestar, all white; all within a narrow gray border.

=== Significance ===
The black background of the hexagon symbolizes defense of the space domain. The Aquila and Ursa Minor constellations in the forms of a falcon and bear symbolize the organization's unwavering dedication to protect our nation and our forces around the globe. The surveillance rings encircling the globe represent Space Base Delta 2's support of missile warning around the planet. The Delta orienting towards the North Star and lifted by surveillance rays symbolizes the organization's commitment to the USSF and also pays tribute to the 2d Space Wing. The platinum border represents Space Base Delta 2's ties to the mission of Space Operations Command (SpOC).

=== Motto ===
"First in Space Operations" approved on 8 June 1989.

== Former Emblem ==
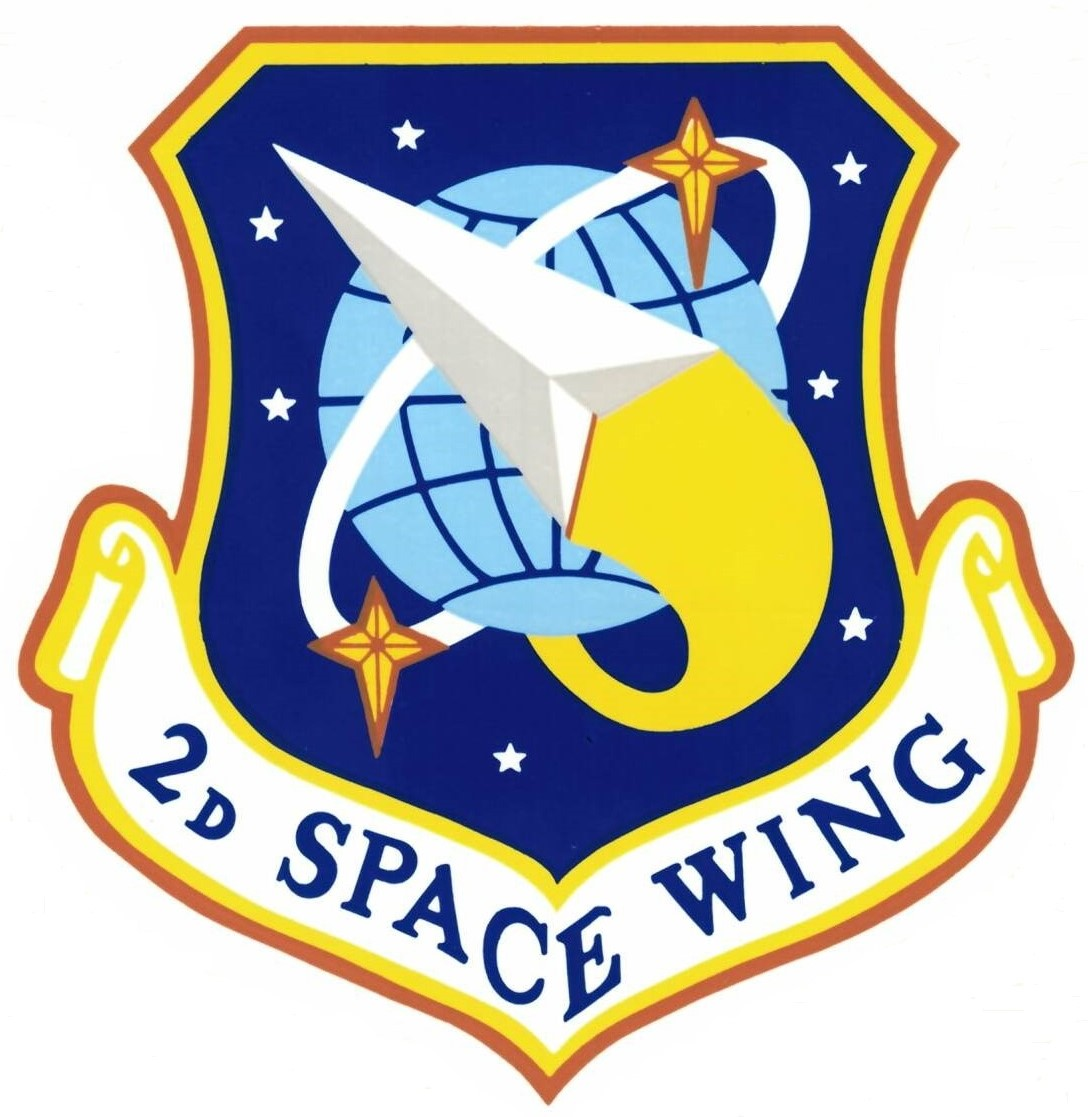
Emblem of 2d Space Wing

=== Blazon ===
Azure, within a pattern of seven mullets Argent, a globe Celeste gridlined of the first, encompassed by an orbital ring bendwise sinister Argent bearing two polestars Or, overall a flight symbol bendwise Argent emitting a contrail Or, all within a diminished border of the last.

=== Significance ===
Blue and yellow are the Air Force colors. Blue alludes to the sky, the primary theater of operations for the Air Force. Yellow refers to the sun and the excellence required of all Airmen. The globe represents the earth as viewed from space and signifies the worldwide coverage provided by Air Force satellites in accomplishing surveillance and communications missions. The ellipse symbolizes the Air Force Satellite Control Network and the two stars depict satellites. The delta and its contrail denote the Air Force launch vehicles that place the satellites in orbit. The seven stars represent that vastness of space and the environment of our operations.

=== Motto ===
"First in Space Operations" approved on 8 June 1989.

== List of commanders ==
No.	Commander		Term			Ref.
No.	Portrait	Name	Took office	Left office	Duration	Ref.
1	Devin R. Pepper	Colonel; Devin R. Pepper	24 July 2020	14 January 2021	174 days	
–	Brian C. Chellgren	Colonel; Brian C. Chellgren; Acting	14 January 2021	4 June 2021	141 days	
2	Marcus D. Jackson	Colonel; Marcus D. Jackson	4 June 2021	15 June 2023	2 years, 11 days	
3	Heidi L. Dexter	Colonel; Heidi L. Dexter	15 June 2023	10 July 2025	2 years, 25 days	
4	Eamon R. Murray	Colonel; Eamon R. Murray	10 July 2025	Incumbent	336 days	
