= Roger G. DeKok =

United States Air Force general

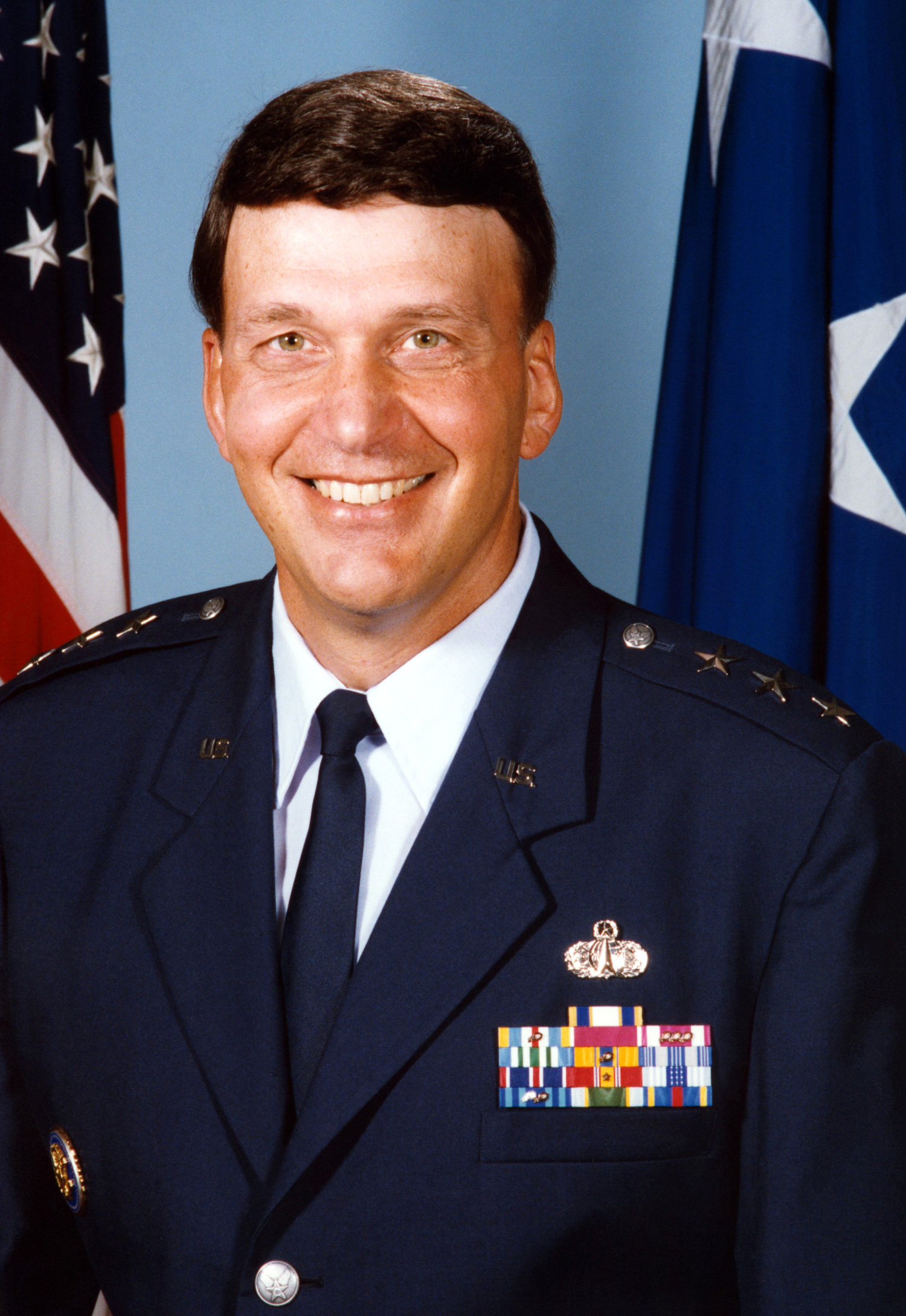
- Born: January 10, 1947
- Died: April 23, 2003 (aged 56); Omaha, Nebraska
- Military career
- Allegiance: United States
- Branch: United States Air Force
- Rank: Lieutenant general
- Commands: Space and Missile Systems Center; 50th Space Wing; 2d Space Wing; 1st Space Wing
- Awards: Air Force Distinguished Service Medal; Defense Superior Service Medal (2); Legion of Merit

Roger G. DeKok (January 10, 1947 – April 23, 2003) was a lieutenant general in the United States Air Force.

== Personal life ==
DeKok was a graduate of the University of Wisconsin-Madison, obtaining a Bachelor of Arts in mathematics. DeKok earned a Master of Science degree in systems management in 1979 from the Air Force Institute of Technology. He died on April 24, 2003, during a business trip.

== Military career ==
In 1971 DeKok was assigned to the North American Air Defense Command. Later he would work on the Space Shuttle program. In 1987 he was assigned to the White House and in 1989 he was assigned to The Pentagon. Later he would take command of the 1st Space Wing, 2d Space Wing, and 50th Space Wing. In 1993 he was named director of plans of Air Force Space Command and was named director of operations at the United States Space Command in 1995. The next year he took command of the Space and Missile Systems Center. In 2000 he was named vice commander of the Air Force Space Command. His retirement was effective as of April 1, 2002.

Awards DeKok received include the Air Force Distinguished Service Medal, the Defense Superior Service Medal with oak leaf cluster, the Legion of Merit, the Meritorious Service Medal with three oak leaf clusters, the Joint Service Commendation Medal, the Air Force Commendation Medal with oak leaf cluster, the Air Force Achievement Medal, the Presidential Service Badge, and the Astronaut Badge.

The DeKok Building on Schriever Space Force Base is named in his honor.
