= 23rd Space Operations Squadron =

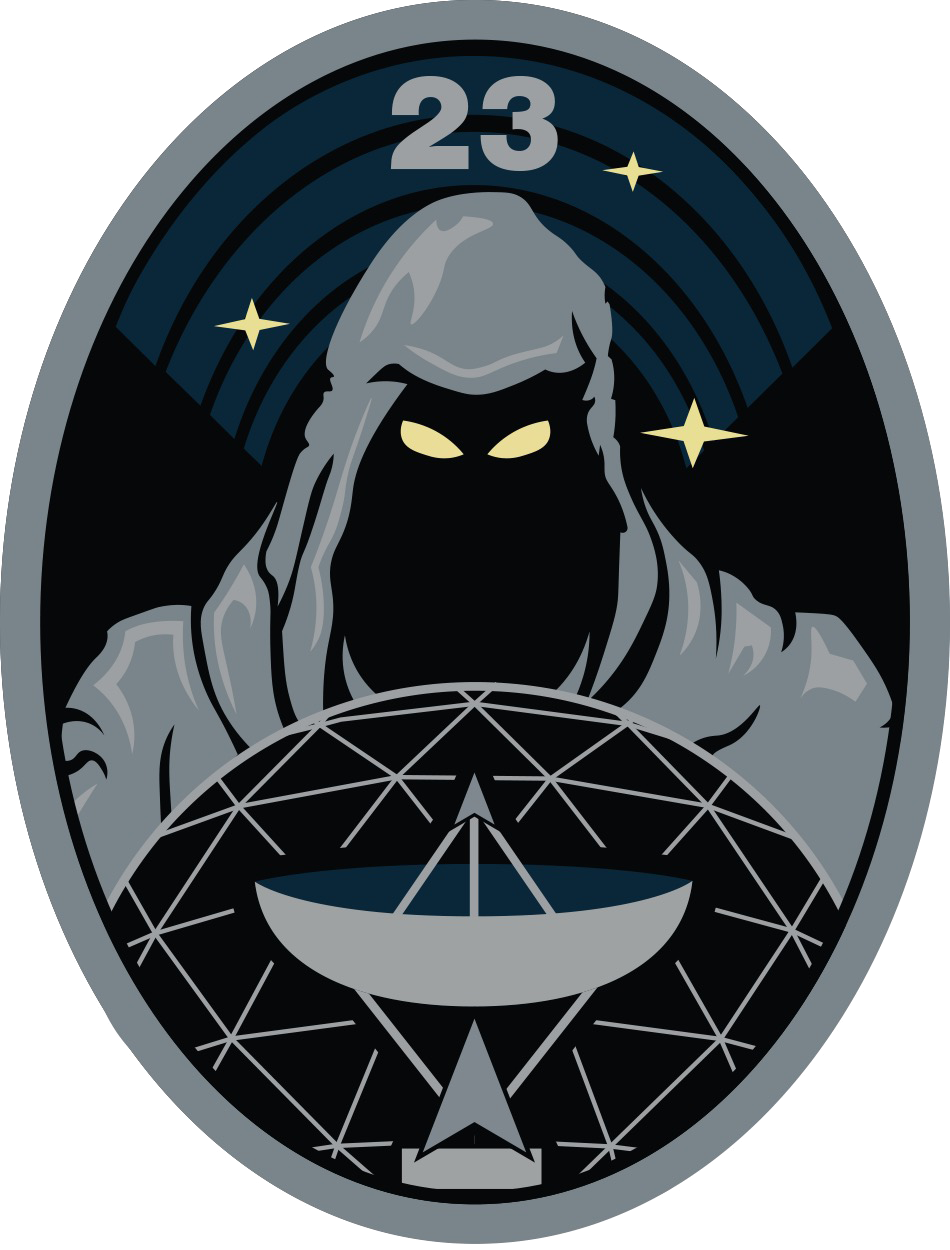
- Squadron emblem
- Active: November 1, 1991 – present
- Country: United States
- Branch: United States Space Force
- Type: Space operations
- Role: Satellite command and control
- Part of: Space Delta 6
- Home base: New Boston Space Force Station
- Mottos: "Semper vigilans" (Latin for "Always watchful")
- Equipment: Satellite Control Network

Commanders
- Commander: Lt Col Devin Zufelt

Insignia
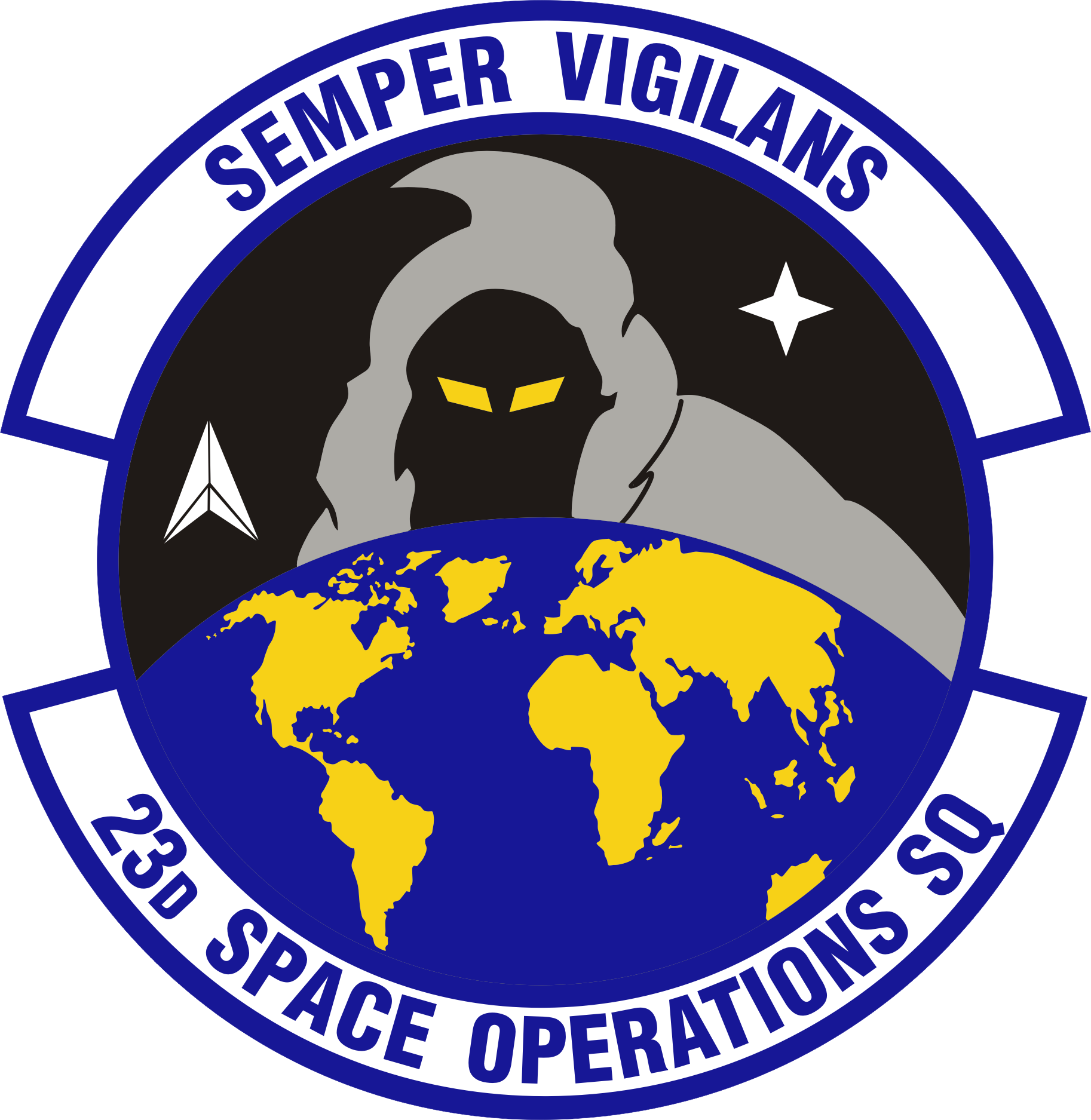
- 23rd Space Operations Squadron (in use until transfer to the Space Force)

The 23rd Space Operations Squadron (23 SOPS) is a satellite control unit of the United States Space Force. It is part of Space Delta 6 and is located at New Boston Space Force Station, New Hampshire. Prior to July 2020, part of the 50th Network Operations Group, itself a part of the 50th Space Wing.

== History ==
=== 23rd Airways Detachment (1942–1943) ===
The 23rd Space Operations Squadron was originally activated on 25 July 1942 as the 23rd Airways Detachment. The squadron served in India and China during World War II, earning campaign streamers for India-Burma (1942–1945) and the China Defensive (1942–1945) before disbanding on 1 December 1943.

=== Air Force Space Command (1991–2019) ===
On 1 November 1991, the Air Force reconstituted the 23rd Airways Detachment and designated it the 23rd Space Operations Squadron (23rd SOPS). Air Force Space Command (AFSPC) activated the unit at New Boston Air Force Station in New Hampshire.

The squadron assumed responsibility for the operation of the New Hampshire Tracking Station, replacing a detachment of the 2nd Satellite Tracking Group. Satellite support operations there had begun on 1 April 1960, using van-mounted equipment. Simultaneous with van operations, the installation of equipment in permanent facilities began under the Weapons Systems 117L program. Van operations were gradually phased out, and by June 1964 the entire station was operating in permanent facilities. By the summer of 1964, the station had dual satellite tracking, telemetry and commanding capabilities. On 1 October 1987 the operations were transferred to AFSPC, and the station moved from a research and development environment into the operational Air Force.

On 10 March 2004, the squadron was realigned under the 50th Network Operations Group, part of the 50th Space Wing. It began supporting three other SCN sites in October 2010, including Detachment 1 located at Thule Air Base in Greenland, and RAF Oakhanger in the United Kingdom. The third site, the Eastern Vehicle Checkout Facility (EVCF), is located at Cape Canaveral Air Force Station in Florida (callsign BEACH) and ensures SCN capabilities and operation of satellites prior to and during initial launch. The squadron began supporting two Global Positioning System (GPS) ground antennas and monitor stations on 1 August 2011. One is located at Cape Canaveral and the other is located at Ascension Auxiliary Air Field on Ascension Island in the South Atlantic Ocean.

The squadron completed installation of an Automated Remote Tracking Station capability at the Eastern Vehicle Checkout Facility based at Cape Canaveral Air Force Station on 29 August 2013. The EVCF is responsible for launch-based compatibility testing and launch data collection, primarily on the Eastern Launch Range.

=== US Space Force (2019–present) ===
The squadron was realigned to Space Delta 6 of the United States Space Force on 24 July 2020.

== Mission ==
The 23rd Space Operations Squadron (23rd SOPS) provides US Space Command with critical satellite command and control capability to more than 190 Department of Defense, national and civilian satellites performing intelligence, weather, navigation, early-warning and communications operations.

=== Locations ===
The squadron provides assured access to space and cyberspace by operating and maintaining the Satellite Control Network's largest remote tracking station at New Boston Space Force Station in New Hampshire, as well as at three other Geographically Separate Units located at Pituffik Space Base in Greenland, Oakhanger in the United Kingdom, and the Eastern Vehicle Checkout Facility (EVCF) at Cape Canaveral Space Force Station in Florida.

== Operations ==
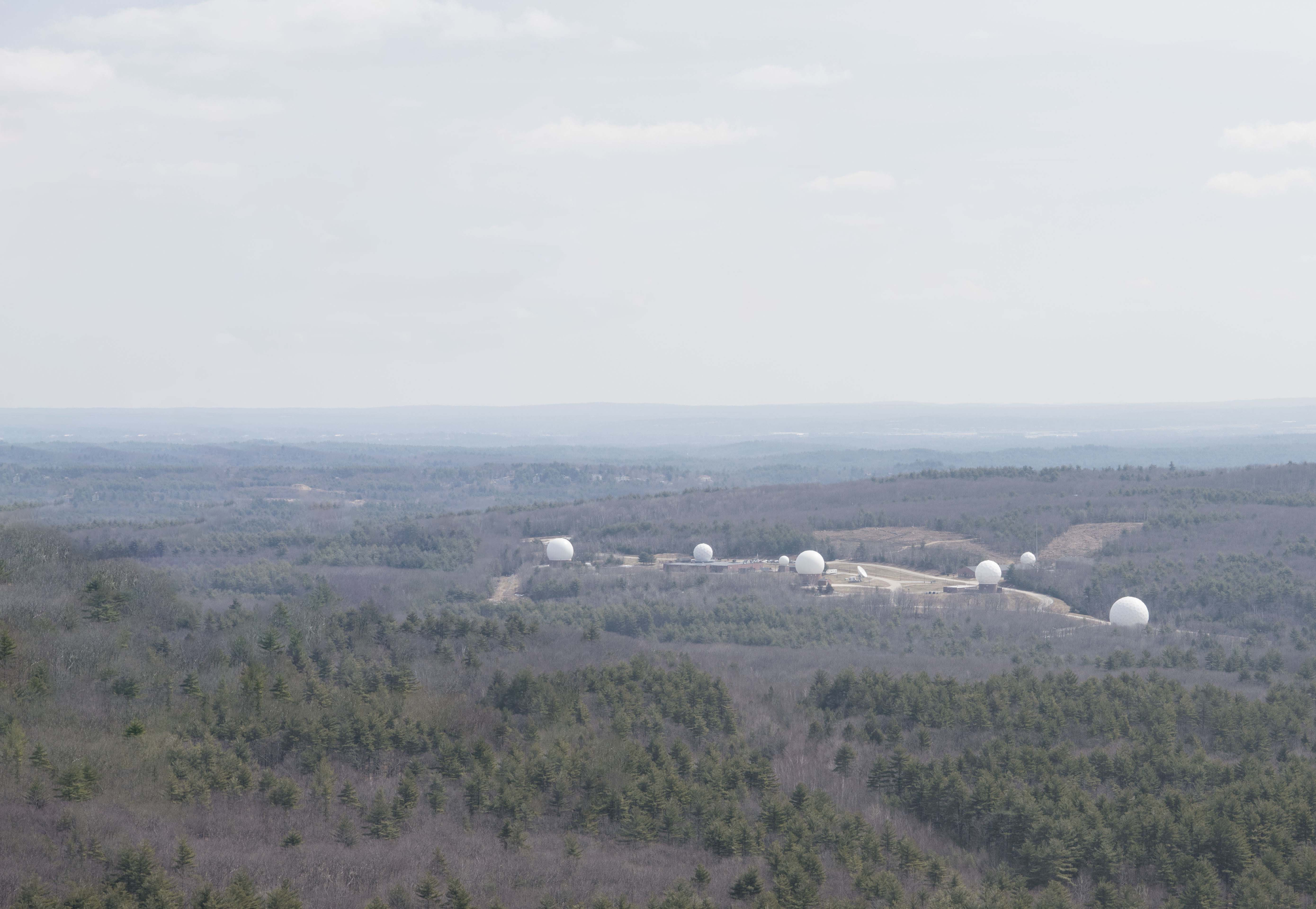
An aerial view of New Boston Space Force Station, home of the 23rd Space Operations Squadron

The squadron provides real-time capability to users performing on-orbit tracking, telemetry, commanding, and mission data retrieval services. Additionally, the squadron provides remote command and control capability through two Global Positioning System (GPS) control stations located at Cape Canaveral and Ascension Auxiliary Air Field in the South Atlantic Ocean.

The squadron also operates and maintains a ground station of the Defense Satellite Communications System and additional equipment in support of the National Oceanic and Atmospheric Administration (NOAA) and other mission partners.

The 23rd SOPS operates and maintains New Boston SFS, an installation of 2,826 acres (1,144 ha) which includes infrastructure worth more than $106 million. The squadron performs all station operations for the installation including security, civil engineering, communications, services, natural resources and safety.

== List of commanders ==
- Lt Col David G. Hanson, 28 June 2011
- Lt Col Sarah Jackson, ~2013
- Lt Col Marty Easter, ~2015
- Lt Col Kenneth Holmes, ~2017
- Lt Col Daniel Highlander, 2 July 2019
- Lt Col David Zesinger, 12 July 2021
- Lt Col Devin Zufelt, 22 June 2023
