= 69th Cyberspace Squadron =

United States Space Force unit

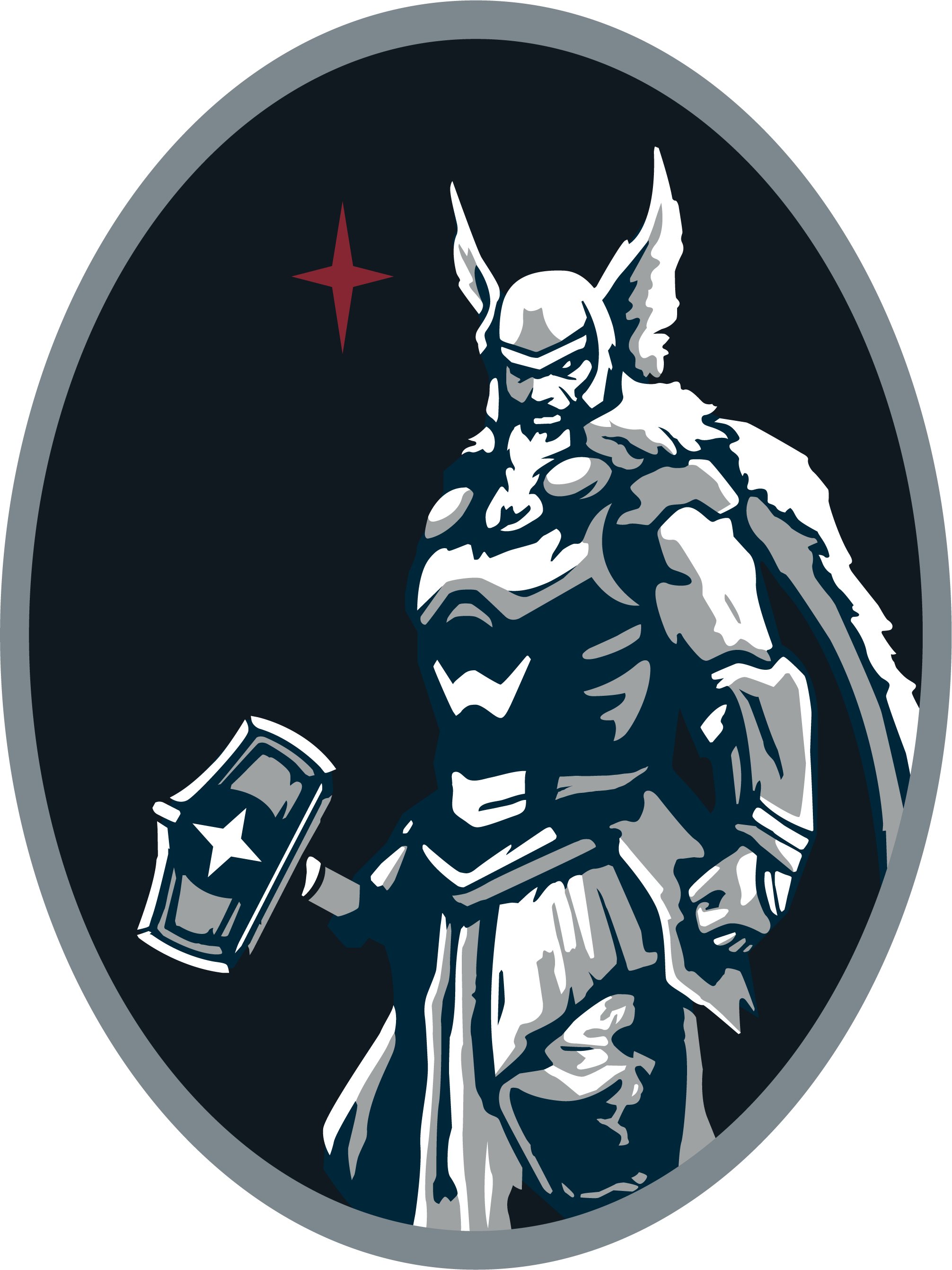
- 69 CYS emblem
- Country: United States
- Branch: United States Space Force
- Role: Strategic communications
- Size: Squadron
- Part of: Space Delta 6
- Garrison/HQ: Schriever Air Force Base, Colorado

Commanders
- Current commander: Lt Col Eve O'Connor

The 69th Cyberspace Squadron (69 CYS) is a squadron of the United States Space Force located at Schriever Space Force Base, Colorado. It is part of Space Delta 9 and responsible for conducting defensive cyberspace operations enabling operations in support of Space Delta 9's orbital warfare mission at Schriever Space Force Base, Colorado, and Space Delta 6's Satellite Control Network at various locations around the world. The 50th Communications Squadron was redesignated as the 69 Cyberspace Squadron on 15 Oct 2022.

== Functions in 2020 ==
The 50th SCS provides command and control systems supporting $50 billion in national satellite and terrestrial systems for the President, the U.S., Allied and coalition forces. The squadron operates and maintains communications-computer systems establishing real-time global connectivity to more than 150 satellites comprising the Global Positioning System, Defense Meteorological Satellite Program, Defense Satellite Program, Defense Satellite Communications System, Milstar, Fleet Satellite Communications System, Ultra High Frequency Follow-On System, NATO, Defense Advanced Research Program Agency and test system satellites through the $6.2 billion Air Force Satellite Control Network.

The 50th SCS operates and maintains base communications systems including inside and outside cable plant, base telephone switches and systems, Defense Red Switch Network switch, Defense Information Systems Agency multifunction switch, security control systems, video teleconferencing systems, Non-secure Internet Protocol Router Network, Secure Internet Protocol Router Network and land mobile radios delivering command, control, computers, communications and information services to more than 8,000 base personnel. It also provides logistics sustainment support to 18 Geographically Separated Units at 14 sites around the world.

The 50th SCS operates Delta 6's Air Force Cyber Defense Correlation Cell for Space (CDCC-S) and executes defensive cyberspace operations to protect and defend critical space mission systems.

The 50th SCS manages 70 DISA nodes providing secure/non-secure voice and data communications for more than 485 worldwide sites. The squadron manages the Department of Defense Global Broadcast Service.

Finally, the squadron provides Schriever AFB and the delta information assurance, knowledge operations, records management, Freedom of Information Act oversight, spectrum management, configuration management, multimedia services and quality control services.

== Chain of command ==
- United States Department of Defense
- United States Space Force
- Space Operations Command
- Space Delta 6

== Lineage ==
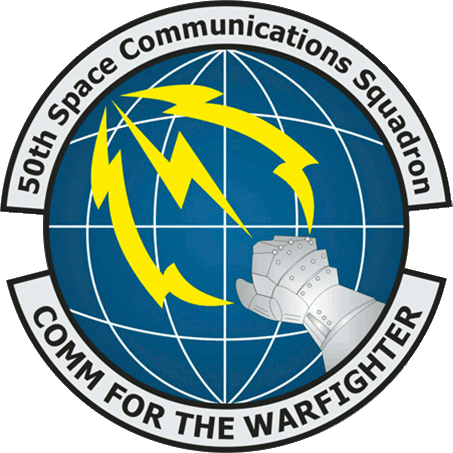
Emblem approx. 2002-2021

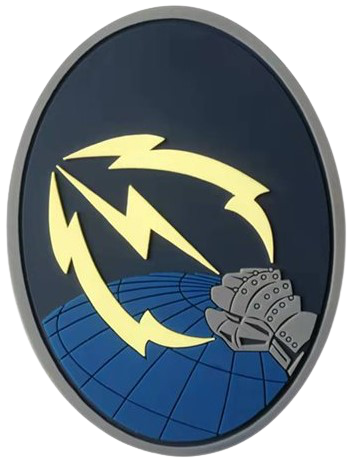
Emblem in 2022

- Constituted 50th Communications Squadron, 15 November 1952
- Activated, 1 January 1953
- Discontinued and inactivated, 1 July 1962
- Activated, 1 March 1991
- Inactivated, 30 September 1991
- Redesignated 50th Satellite Communications Squadron, 1 January 1992
- Activated, 30 January 1992
- Redesignated 50th Space Communications Squadron, 1 July 1992
- Redesignated 50th Communications Squadron, 1 December 1997
- Redesignated 50th Space Communications Squadron, 1 October 2002
- Redesignated 50th Communications Squadron, 24 July 2020
- Changed status from a unit of United States Air Force to a unit of United States Space Force, 15 July 2021
- Redesignated 69th Cyberspace Squadron, 15 October 2022

== Assignments ==
- 50th Air Base (later 50th Combat Support) Group, 1 January 1953 – 1 July 1962
- 50th Tactical Fighter Wing, 1 May – 30 September 1991
- 50th Operations Group, 30 January 1992
- 50th Communications Group, 1 December 1997
- 50th Maintenance Group, 1 October 2002
- 50th Communications Group, 1 June 2003 – 9 March 2004
- 50th Network Operations Group, 10 March 2004 – 2020
- 50th Mission Support Group, 24 July 2020 - May 2022
- Space Base Delta 1, 23 May 2022 - 14 October 2022
- Space Delta 6, 15 October 2022 - present

== Stations ==
- Clovis AFB, NM, 1 January – 23 July 1953
- Hahn AB, Germany, 10 August 1953
- Toul-Rosieres AB, France, 10 July 1956
- Hahn AB, Germany, 1 September 1959 – 1 July 1962
- Hahn AB, Germany, 1 May – 30 September 1991
- Falcon Air Force Station (later Base, later Schriever AFB then SFB), Colorado, 30 January 1992

== List of commanders ==
- Lt Col Jody D. Acres, 30 January 1992? – 12 July 1994
- Maj Robert M. Flowers, 13 July 1994 – 4 August 1996
- Lt Col Charles H. Ayala, 5 August 1996 – 22 July 1998
- Lt Col Michael J. Kelley, 23 July 1998 – 22 March 2000
- Lt Col Thomas T. Shields, 23 March 2000 – 2 November 2000
- Lt Col Mark L. Hinchman, 3 November 2000 – 17 December 2000
- Lt Col Mona Lisa D. Tucker, 18 December 2000 – 25 June 2002
- Lt Col Michael J. Clark, 26 June 2002 – 6 July 2004
- Lt Col Mark G. Langenderfer, 7 July 2004 – 9 July 2006
- Lt Col Donovan L. Routsis, 10 July 2006 – 18 August 2008
- Lt Col Donald Fielden, 19 August 2008 – 3 February 2010
- Lt Col Fred H. Taylor, 4 February 2010 – 6 August 2012
- Lt Col Lynn Plunkett, 7 August 2012 – 9 July 2014
- Lt Col David A. Case, 9 July 2014 – 19 July 2016
- Lt Col Heather Uhl, 19 July 2016 – 21 June 2018
- Lt Col Anthony L. Lang, 21 June 2018 – 22 June 2020
- Lt Col Shane M. Warren, 22 June 2020 – 1 May 2024
- Lt Col Eve O'Connor, 1 May 2024 – Present

== Awards and decorations ==
Air Force Outstanding Unit Award:

- 1 July 1990 – 5 August 1991
- 1 October 1998 – 30 September 2000
- 1 October 2000 – 1 October 2001
- 1 October 2001 – 1 October 2002
- 2 October 2002 – 1 October 2003
- 1 October 2007 - 30 September 2009

Meritorious Unit Award:

- 10 September 2021 - 1 December 2021

== 2002-2021 emblem ==
=== Description (blazon) ===
Azure gridlined as a globe Argent, a gauntlet issuant from sinister base bendwise Silver Gray issuing a lightning flash between two arcing lightning flashes bendwise Or; all within a diminished bordure Sable. Attached above the disc a Gray scroll edged with a narrow Black border. Attached below the disc a Gray scroll edged with a narrow Black border and inscribed "COMM FOR THE WARFIGHTER" in Black letters.

=== Significance ===
Blue and yellow are the Air Force colors. Blue alludes to the sky, the primary theater of Air Force operations. Yellow refers to the sun and the excellence required of Air Force personnel. The globe represents the earth. The gauntlet denotes power and the flexibility of space communications. The lightning bolts symbolize communications through teamwork and unity which result in swift and accurate striking power.

== See also ==
- Space Delta 6
