= MOD Oakhanger =

Royal Air Force airbase in England

RAF Oakhanger MOD Oakhanger
- Near Bordon, East Hampshire in England
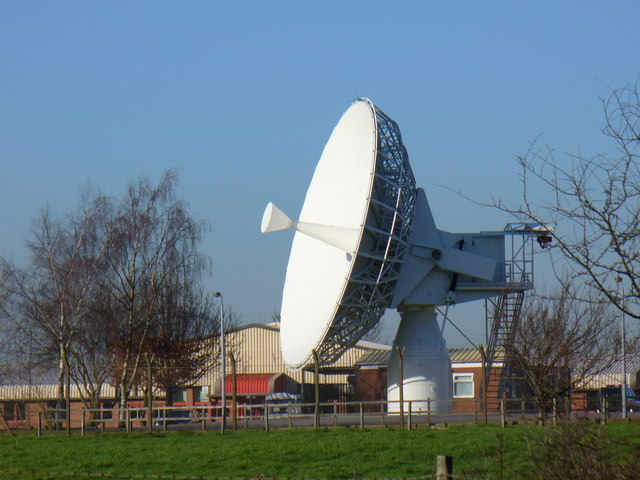
- Satellite dish at Oakhanger

- Ultra Tellurem Dico (Latin for 'I speak beyond the Earth')

Site information
- Type: Military satellite communications station
- Owner: Ministry of Defence
- Operator: Royal Air Force (1966–2003); Paradigm Secure Communications (2003–2013); Airbus Defence and Space (2013 – 2024); Babcock International (2024 – present)

Location
- Location within Hampshire
- Coordinates: 51°6′55.31″N 0°53′36.5″W
- Area: 55 hectares

Site history
- Built: 1966
- In use: 1966–
- Fate: Operation of station transferred to the private sector under a private finance initiative contract.

RAF Oakhanger was a Royal Air Force station in Hampshire split over three operational sites; with accommodation in nearby Bordon. The main site and operations centre is located near the village of Oakhanger, the two other sites being nearby. The parent station for administrative purposes was RAF Odiham.

The site is now MOD Oakhanger.

== History ==
RAF Oakhanger was the home of No. 1001 Signal Unit, responsible for supporting satellite communications services for the British Armed Forces worldwide. The unit was made up of four sub-units: Space Operations, Ground Operations, Telemetry and Control, and Support; with subordinate detachments based at RAF Rudloe Manor, RAF Colerne and RAF Defford. Command and Control of the system was conducted from Oakhanger, with a planning unit based at Rudloe Manor, co-located with No. 1 Signal Unit and Controller Defence Communication Network. The Colerne and Defford detachments provided a ground anchoring capability for the communications spacecraft. The Defford detachment was managed by the Defence Evaluation and Research Agency, later QinetiQ.

Space Squadron was responsible for flying a constellation of Skynet satellites, up to the fourth iteration of six space vehicles which supported Army, Royal Navy and Royal Air Force units. The space vehicles were controlled on a permanent basis from Oakhanger, with command and control traffic being passed from one of the three ground stations. Space Squadron also controlled the flight of space vehicles on behalf of NATO, with an earth station at the nearby NATO ground terminal. The constellation comprised geosynchronous satellites, providing Earth coverage and higher-power coverage over Northern Europe.

Ground services was responsible for routing traffic via the space vehicles, from a number of locations in the United Kingdom, to either stationary ground terminals such as Germany, Cyprus, Ascension Island and the Falkland Islands, or tactical ground terminals, mounted in ships or vehicles. Tactical terminals were operated by the Tactical Communications Wing, 30 Signal Regiment, 16 Signal Regiment, 249 (AMF(L)) Signal Squadron, 264 (SAS) Signal Squadron, or the Royal Marines Signal Squadrons.

== Current use ==
Support to British military satellite communications was outsourced to EADS Astrium's subsidiary company—Paradigm Secure Communications—in 2003, as a Private Finance Initiative. Paradigm Secure Communications was then known as Airbus Defence and Space.

The site is now operated by Babcock International under the Skynet Service Delivery Wrap (SDW) contract which commenced in March 2024.

RAF Oakhanger is now used to support the Skynet 5 constellation and the United States Space Force's Satellite Control Network. A very small contingent from the U.S. 23rd Space Operations Squadron are stationed at RAF Oakhanger who with MOD civilians and contractors provide support to over 175 U.S. and allied satellites, the only site where U.S. satellites are supported by non-U.S. personnel.

== See also ==
- Longmoor Camp
- List of former Royal Air Force stations
