= Satellite Control Network =

Defense satellite communications project

The Satellite Control Network (SCN), operated by the United States Space Force's Space Delta 6, provides support for the operation, control, and maintenance of a variety of United States Department of Defense and some non-DoD satellites. This involves continual execution of Telemetry, Tracking, and Commanding (TT&C) operations. In addition, the SCN provides prelaunch checkout and simulation, launch support, and early orbit support while satellites are in initial or transfer orbits and require maneuvering to their final orbit. The SCN provides tracking data to help maintain the catalog of space objects and distributes various data such as satellite ephemeris, almanacs, and other information. It was previously known as the Air Force Satellite Control Network (AFSCN) while under Air Force Space Command's 50th Network Operations Group.

== Overview ==
The Satellite Control Network consists of satellite control centers, tracking stations, and test facilities located around the world. Satellite Operations Centers (SOCs) are located at Schriever Space Force Base near Colorado Springs, Colorado, and various other locations throughout the continental United States. These SOCs are staffed around the clock and are responsible for the command and control of their assigned satellite systems. The SOCs are linked to remote tracking stations (RTSs) around the world. Space vehicle checkout facilities are used to test launch vehicles and satellite platforms to ensure that the onboard systems operate within specifications. The RTSs provide the link between the satellites and the SOCs. A similar relationship exists for dedicated networks, which are outside the purview of the Satellite Control Network. RTSs around the world are needed to maintain frequent communications with the satellite. Without RTSs, the SOCs would only be able to contact a satellite when it came into the control center's view. Some satellites, especially those in geostationary orbit, never come within view of their control center. Each antenna at an RTS is referred to as a "side". Previously, Side A typically included a 60-foot-diameter (18 m) dish antenna. Side B typically included a 46-foot-diameter (14 m) antenna. At some sites, the B side included a 33-foot-diameter (10 m) antenna. Over time, however, as the network upgraded and/or replaced the antennas, the old conventions no longer apply.

== History ==
The Satellite Control Network was originally activated to support the CORONA (Discoverer) program in 1959. An interim satellite control center was initially established in Palo Alto, California, and by June 1960, a permanent control center had been established Sunnyvale AFS, later renamed Onizuka AFS, Sunnyvale, California. The main operations control center, now at Schriever Space Force Base, Colorado Springs, CO, functions as a central command and control node for the remote tracking stations established at several different locations.

== Locations ==
- Schriever Space Force Base, Colorado – Primary C2 Node
- Ellison Onizuka Satellite Operations Facility (EOSOF) at Vandenberg Space Force Base, California – Secondary C2 Node.

The Satellite Control Network maintains a number of tracking stations, which are used to track (primarily) US government agency & military satellites, as well as receive and process telemetry and send commands to these satellites. Said facilities are intended to support all Department of Defense satellites. Most tracking stations are operated by operational detachments of the 21st Space Operations Squadron (21 SOPS) and 23d Space Operations Squadron. Many scientific and research satellites are supported as well.

== Current Remote Tracking Stations ==
- Diego Garcia Station (DGS), Diego Garcia, BIOT; callsign REEF. The Diego Garcia Station has two sides (as of 2010) to provide enhanced tracking for the Satellite Control Network users. This site also includes a GPS Ground Antenna site.
- Guam Tracking Station (GTS), Guam; callsign GUAM. The Guam Tracking Station has two sides (one ARTS and one RBC) and is undergoing a "hybridization" upgrade that replaces the old A-side ARTS system with an RBC core electronics suite and upgrades the existing 60-foot antenna.
- Hawaii Tracking Station (HTS), Kaena Point Satellite Tracking Station, Hawaii; callsign HULA. The Hawaii Tracking Station is located on the island of Oahu and also includes an ARTS side and an RBC side. The Hawaii Tracking Station is also undergoing a "hybridization" effort that will replace the old B-side ARTS system and upgrade the existing 60-foot antenna (previously the A-side).
- New Hampshire Station (NHS), New Boston SFS, New Hampshire; callsign BOSS. The New Hampshire Tracking Station is located in New Boston, New Hampshire. As of 2013, the site had two ARTS sides and an RBC side.
- Telemetry & Command Station (TCS), RAF Oakhanger, in England, operated by the United Kingdom and supporting the Satellite Control Network through a Memorandum of Agreement between the UK Ministry of Defence and the US Department of Defense; callsign LION. As of 2010, the site includes three sides, two ARTS and an RBC.
- Thule Tracking Station (TTS), Pituffik Space Base, Greenland; callsign POGO. The station 76°30′57″N 68°36′0″W) is a U.S. Space Force installation in Greenland. It is near Pituffik Space Base and has a Remote Tracking Station (callsign: Polar Orbiting Geophysical Observatory (POGO)) of the Satellite Control Network. It was originally the classified 6594th Test Wing's Operating Location 5 designated by Air Force Systems Command on 15 October 1961: the station was operational on 30 March 1962, with "transportable antenna vans parked in an old Strategic Air Command bomb assembly building." The permanent RTS equipment was emplaced in 1964, and a communications terminal was emplaced on Pingarssuit Mountain—Thule Site N-32 (moved to Thule Site J in 1983.

The station transferred to Detachment 3, 22nd Space Operations Squadron, in 1992.

It includes a "fully equipped mini-fitness center". It was a three-sided site until the summer of 2011, when the "C" side was decommissioned and dismantled in preparation for system upgrades. The upgrade to an Automated Remote Tracking Station was planned to be completed in 2015. In May, 2013, the A-side antenna suffered a mechanical failure that prompted an early decommissioning. From that time, the site operated only with its B-side. Starting in 2014, the new C-side RBC installation got under way. This is the northernmost RTS, located at approximately 76.4 degrees north latitude. As of February 2015, the RBC installation is nearly complete, with just a few minor details to be finished before the formal testing gets underway in the May/June timeframe.

- Vandenberg Tracking Station (VTS), California; callsign COOK. This is a dual-sided station which provides normal on-orbit support but also provides pre-launch checkouts and launch support for the Western Test Range at Vandenberg Space Force Base.

== Automated Remote Tracking Stations ==
In the late 1980s and early 1990s, the RTSs were modernized with the addition of the Automated Remote Tracking Station (ARTS) systems. The ARTS systems provided more responsive support and reduced the manpower required at each site through semi-automation. In addition to upgrading all the existing sites, the ARTS Phase I program added the following sites to the Satellite Control Network:

- Colorado Tracking Station at Schriever Air Force Base, Colorado, which had a "cessation of operations" in August 2012 and was formally deactivated in 2014
- Thule Tracking Station "C" side, which was decommissioned in 2011 and dismantled that summer
- Telemetry and Command Station "B" side
- Diego Garcia Station "A" side

== RTS Block Change (RBC) Systems ==
Beginning in 2004, an upgrade effort was started to replace the ARTS sites, which were already beyond their planned design life. The following sites have been upgraded to the RBC configuration, which includes a 13-meter 3-axis antenna:

- Vandenberg Tracking Station "A" side
- Diego Garcia Station "B" side, added to the network during the upgrade effort
- Telemetry and Command Station "C" side, added to the network during the upgrade effort
- Hawaii Tracking Station "A" side
- Guam Tracking Station "B" side
- New Hampshire Station "B" side
- Thule Tracking Station "C" side

== Closed Remote Tracking Stations ==
- Indian Ocean Station (IOS), Mahe Island, Seychelles; callsign INDI (closed in August 1996, after the Government of Seychelles attempted to "raise the rent" to more than $10 million/year). The Indian Ocean Tracking Station was located on the island of Mahe, the main island of the Seychelles archipelago. It had one 60-foot antenna. Its location was ideal for communicating with geosynchronous satellites over the Indian Ocean. The station was also geographically suited for acquiring realtime or near-realtime data from passes over areas to the north. In 1980, due to political instabilities of the island, the main processing computers were removed and relocated to Sunnyvale. These computers communicated with the IOS downlink and tracking equipment via a wideband (DSCS) communications link. IOS has been supplanted by Diego Garcia RTS.
- Kodiak Tracking Station (KTS), Kodiak Island, Alaska; callsign KODI (closed on 20 March 1975)
- Sunnyvale Control Station, callsign CUBE. Not a true tracking station, in that it had no direct downlink antenna. Instead, CUBE supported operations at TCS/Oakhangar and IOS/Seychelles, where main processing computers could not be located. CUBE had two 'sides', and so could support two satellite passes simultaneously. The 750th Space Group was inactivated in June 1999.
- Colorado Tracking Station (CTS), Schriever AFB, Colorado; callsign PIKE. As of 2008, this site transitioned from an operational location to a testing facility, with operational support as possible. This site formally ceased operational support on 2 August 2012. It used to support various DoD satellites and previously included enhancement equipment that was used to support the Global Positioning System satellites. On 30 September 2014, the site was formally deactivated and closed.

There was a tracking station on Annette Island that is one of the Alaska islands far south east of the Alaska main land area and not too far north of Seattle Washington. It was built in the mid/late 1950s and closed in the early 1960s.

== See also ==
- 50th Space Wing
