= 50th Network Operations Group =

Former United States Air Force cyber group

- Active: March 2004–24 July 2020
- Country: United States
- Branch: United States Air Force (2004-2019); United States Space Force
- Part of: Space Operations Command
- Garrison/HQ: Schriever Air Force Base, Colorado

Insignia
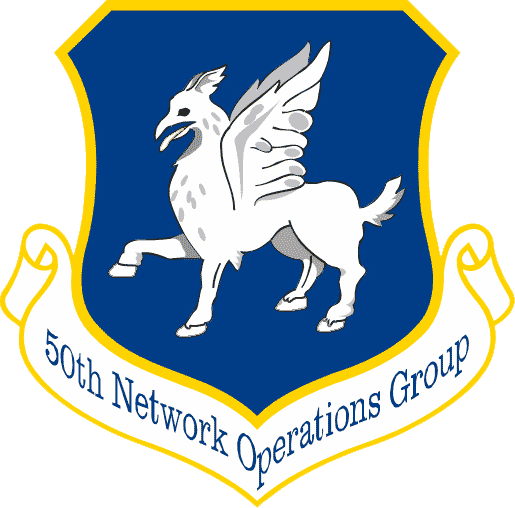
- 50th Network Operations Group emblem

The 50th Network Operations Group (50 NOG) was a United States Air Force group assigned to the 50th Space Wing at Schriever Air Force Base, Colorado. 50 NOG operated the Air Force Satellite Control Network and was responsible for the 50th Space Wing's cyber and communications systems.

In December 2019, the United States Space Force was established and numbers of Air Force personnel were re-assigned to the Space Force, without transferring to the new service. The group's functions were to be taken over by the Space Force, and on 24 July 2020 it was redesignated as Space Force's Space Delta 6.
