= 420th Flight Test Squadron =

US Air Force unit

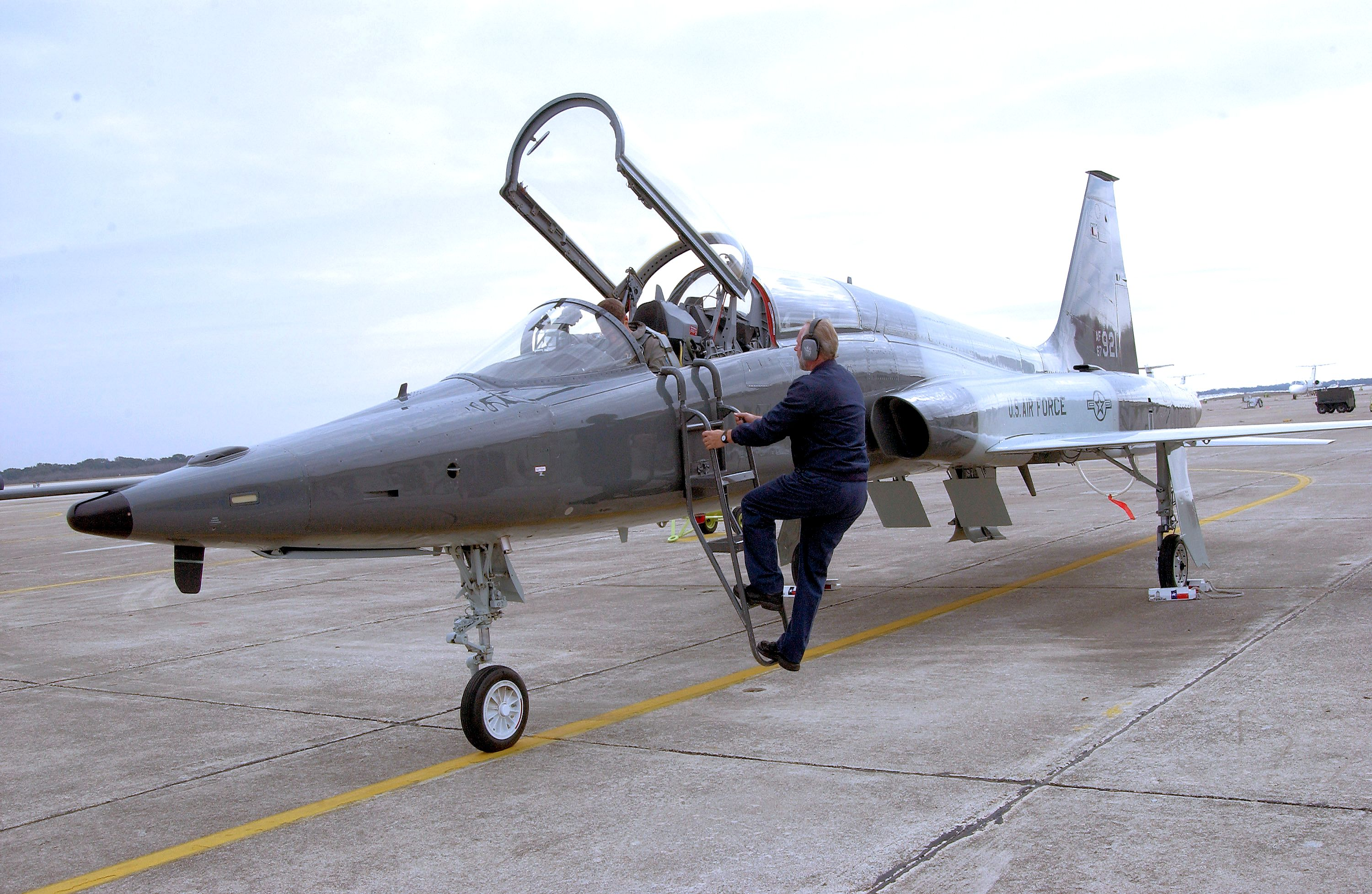
- 420th Flight Test Flight T-38 Talon
- Active: 1943–1944; 1954–1964; 1989–1997; 2001–2007; 2019-present
- Country: United States
- Branch: United States Air Force
- Type: Flight
- Role: Flight Testing
- Part of: Air Force Reserve Command
- Garrison/HQ: Phoenix-Mesa Gateway Airport
- Decorations: Air Force Outstanding Unit Award

Insignia
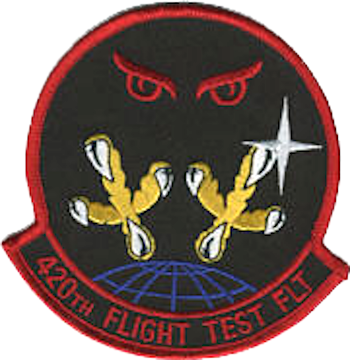
- 420th Flight Test Flight Emblem (Note: Approved 22 May 1996.)

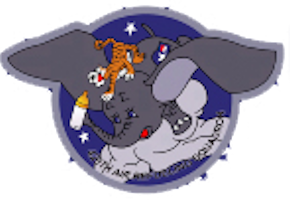
- 420th Air Refueling Squadron Emblem (Note: Approved 20 September 1955.)

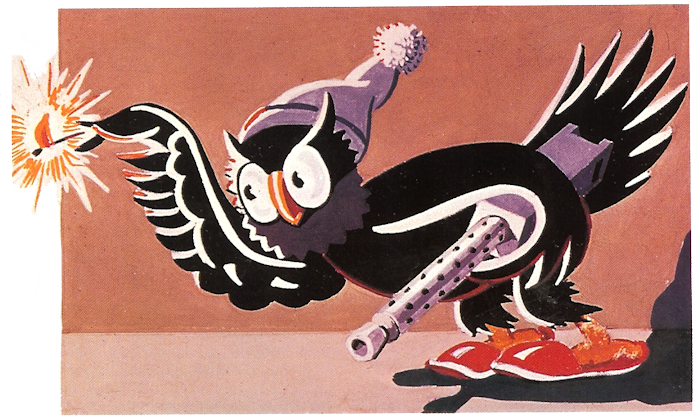
- 420th Night Fighter Squadron Emblem (Note: Approved 13 April 1944. Description: On a rectangle, long axis horizontal, divided per fess abased neutralized yellow orange and light neutralized yellow orange, a caricatured black owl, YAHOOTY, expressing an attitude of alert watchfulness, wearing a light blue gray night cap, light red bedroom slippers, and carrying a blue gray machine gun under the left wing and a lighted match held aloft in feather tips of right wing, all highlighted yellow and casting a grayed blue violet shadow.)

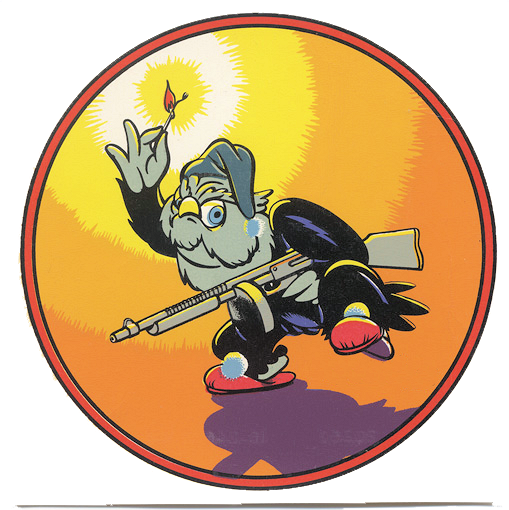
- 420th Night Fighter Squadron Emblem (original design)

Aircraft flown
- Trainer: T-38 Talon

The 420th Flight Test Squadron is an active United States Air Force squadron.

The squadron's first predecessor was activated as the 420th Night Fighter Squadron, one of the first dedicated night fighter operational training squadrons of the Air Force. It trained replacement night fighter pilots who were then deployed overseas into combat until its disbanding in March 1944 due to a realignment of training units.

Its second predecessor was activated as the 420th Air Refueling Squadron under Tactical Air Command in 1954 and moved to England, where it served under the United States Air Forces Europe. It was inactivated when Strategic Air Command assumed the role of single manager for USAF air refueling. In 1985 the night fighter and refueling squadrons were consolidated into a single unit.

The 6520th Test Squadron was organized in 1989 by Air Force Systems Command. In 1992, as the USAF eliminated Major Command controlled (MAJCON) units, the 6520th was consolidated with the 420th and redesignated the 420th Flight Test Squadron. The squadron was inactivated as an active duty unit in 1997, but was activated four years later in the Air Force Reserve Command (AFRES) as the 420th Flight Test Flight. It was assigned to the 413th Flight Test Group of AFRES at Phoenix-Mesa Gateway Airport, Arizona, where it was inactivated on 31 October 2007.

The squadron was reactivated on 4 October 2019 to support flight testing of the Northrop Grumman B-21 Raider.

== History ==
=== World War II ===
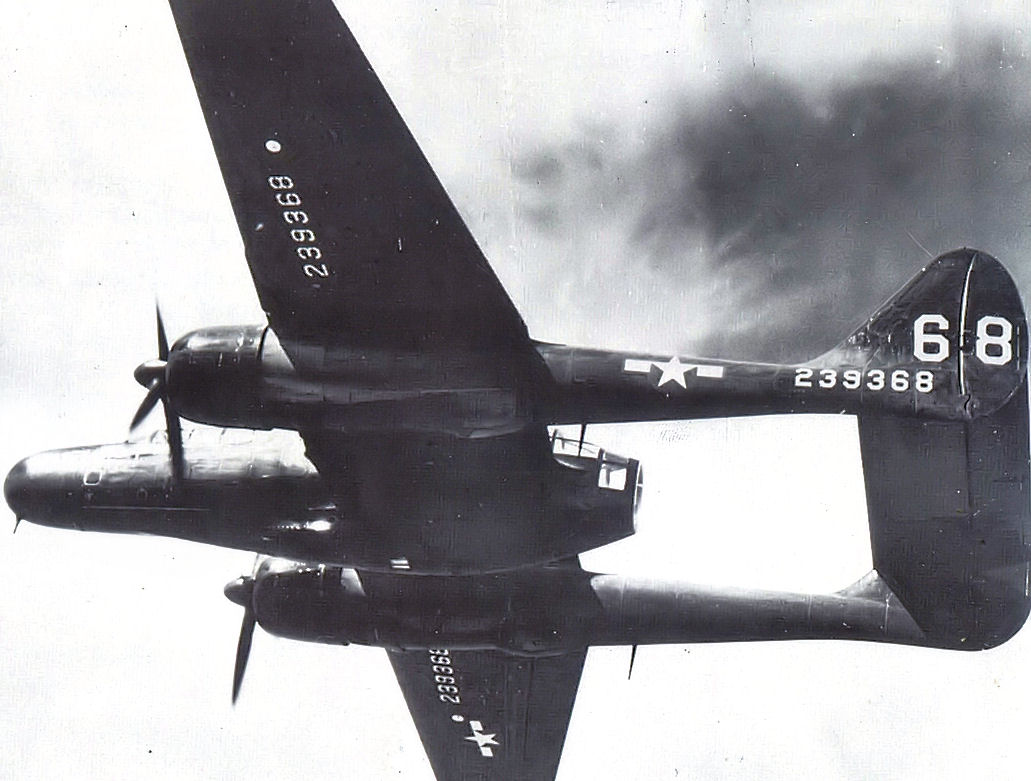
420th Night Fighter Squadron Northrop P-61A Black Widow

The squadron was activated on 1 June 1943 at Orlando Army Air Base, Florida as the third night fighter training squadron of the 481st Night Fighter Operational Training Group (481 NFOTG). Its mission was to be a Replacement Training Unit (RTU) for Night Fighter pilots. It accepted Army Air Forces Training Command's twin-engine flying training and B–25 transition school graduates and trained them as night fighter pilots.

The initial squadron personnel were veteran pilots of the 481 NFOTG, with some being transferred from the group's 348th and 349th Night Fighter Squadrons which performed Operational Training of new squadrons. It was initially equipped with Douglas DB-7s and Douglas P-70s.

As 1943 progressed additional aircraft and equipment arrived and the program expanded. In September, the first American-built dedicated night fighter began to arrive, the Northrup YP-61 Black Widow and a few production P-61As. In January 1944 the entire program moved to Hammer Field, California and was placed under IV Fighter Command. The move placed the squadron near Northrop manufacturing facility at Hawthorne, California and most programmed P-61 squadrons were planned for operations in the Pacific and China Burma India Theaters.

In March 1944 the 420th was disbanded when the AAF found that standard military units, based on relatively inflexible tables of organization were proving less well adapted to the training mission. Accordingly, a more functional system was adopted in which each base was organized into a separate numbered unit during a reorganization of units in the United States. The squadron's personnel and equipment were transferred to Squadron C of the 450th Army Air Forces Base Unit (Night Fighter Replacement Training Unit).

=== Air refueling ===
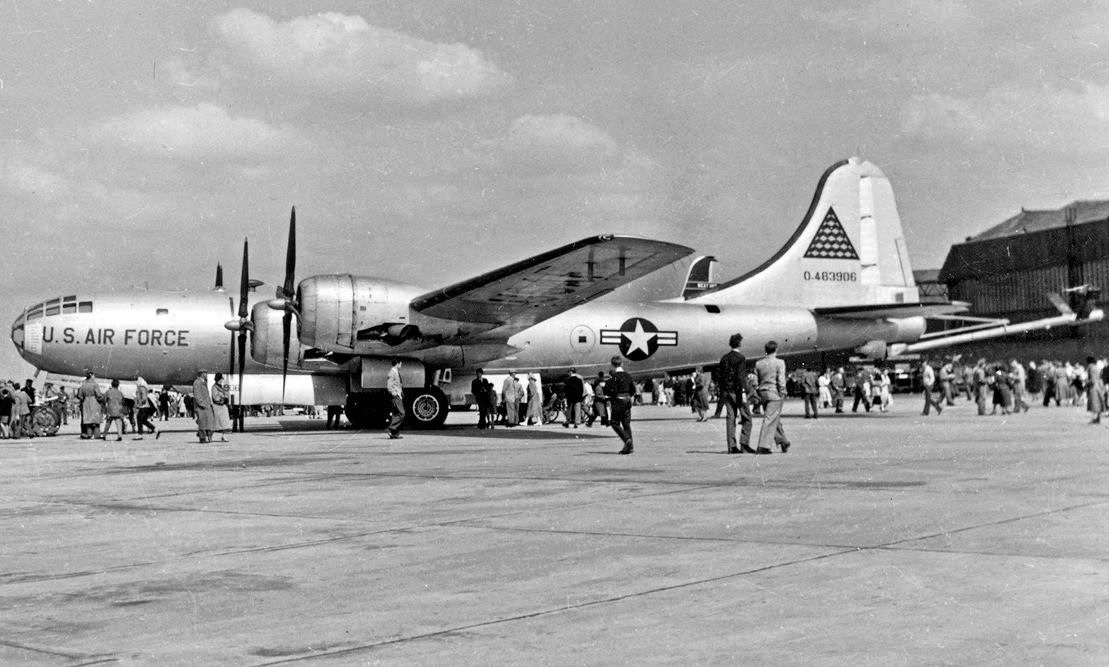
420th Air Refueling Squadron Boeing KB-29P Superfortress based at RAF Sculthorpe, 1956

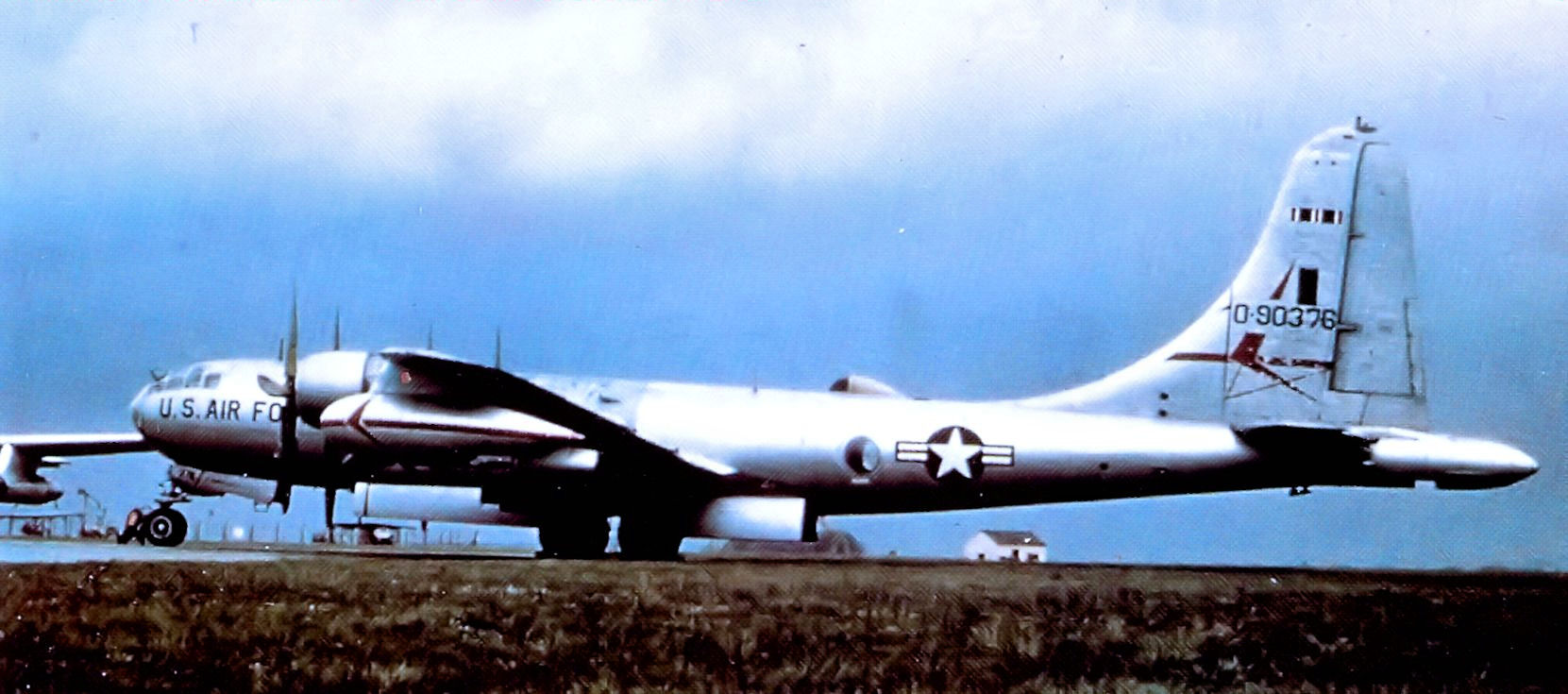
420th Air Refueling Squadron Boeing KB-50 Superfortress, about 1961

The 420th Air Refueling Squadron was activated in 1954 by Tactical Air Command to provide dedicated air refueling for TAC bombers, fighters, and fighter bombers. The 420th was activated at Alexandria Air Force Base, Louisiana and was the first TAC air refueling squadron. The squadron received KB-29Ps fitted with the refueling boom.

In 1955 the unit deployed to United States Air Forces in Europe and was based at RAF Sculthorpe, Norfolk, England to provide air refueling for USAFE squadrons. On 2 February 1957, three KB-29Ps from RAF Sculthorpe were on a weekend training mission over France when two of them collided in poor visibility at 15,000 feet. Out of the combined crew of 19, five survived.

However, the KB-29s were becoming too slow to refuel the newer jet fighters. The increasing performance of swept-wing jet fighters such as the F-100 Super Sabre made it necessary to boost the performance of the tankers, and this was done by re-equipping with the KB-50J Superfortress, featuring an additional General Electric J47 turbojet engine under each wing which provided greater speed for the tanker aircraft. The squadron received its first KB-50J in 1958. The older (and slower) KB-29P was phased out in 1959.

Unfortunately, these tanker aircraft were converted from B-50 bombers that had already seen up to 10 years service, and the already elderly KB-50Js began to deteriorate almost as soon as they were delivered. Due to a chronic parts shortage TAC was forced to resort to cannibalization to keep the retrofitted tanker aircraft flying. Landing gear malfunctions were frequent, and many parts started to break simply because of old age. More and more maintenance had to be performed in order to keep the aircraft flying.

With the 47th Bombardment Wing's inactivation the 420th ARS at Sculthorpe was assigned to the 7375th Combat Support Group, a temporary unit at Sculthorpe after its turnover to the Air Ministry. On 1 September 1963 it was reassigned directly to Third Air Force.

By 1963 the squadron's aircraft began to be phased out, the mission being taken over primarily by Air National Guard Boeing KC-97 Stratofreighters. rotating to Europe under Operation Creek Party. The squadron inactivated in early 1964 and its KB-50Js were sent to the Military Aircraft Storage and Disposition Center at Davis–Monthan Air Force Base. Arizona.

=== B-2 Spirit Flight Testing ===
Air Force Systems Command activated the 6520th Test Squadron in March 1989 at Edwards Air Force Base, California. Its mission was the pre-operational testing of the B-2 Spirit stealth bomber. The B-2 was first revealed to the public on 22 November 1988, when AV-1 (82-1066 "Spirit of America") was unveiled at Air Force Plant 42 near Palmdale, California. At this time the aircraft was still not ready for its first flight. Taxi tests began on 10 July 1989. The B-2 finally made its first flight on 17 July 1989 from Palmdale. The flight lasted 112 minutes and ended with a landing at Edwards and delivery to the 6520th.

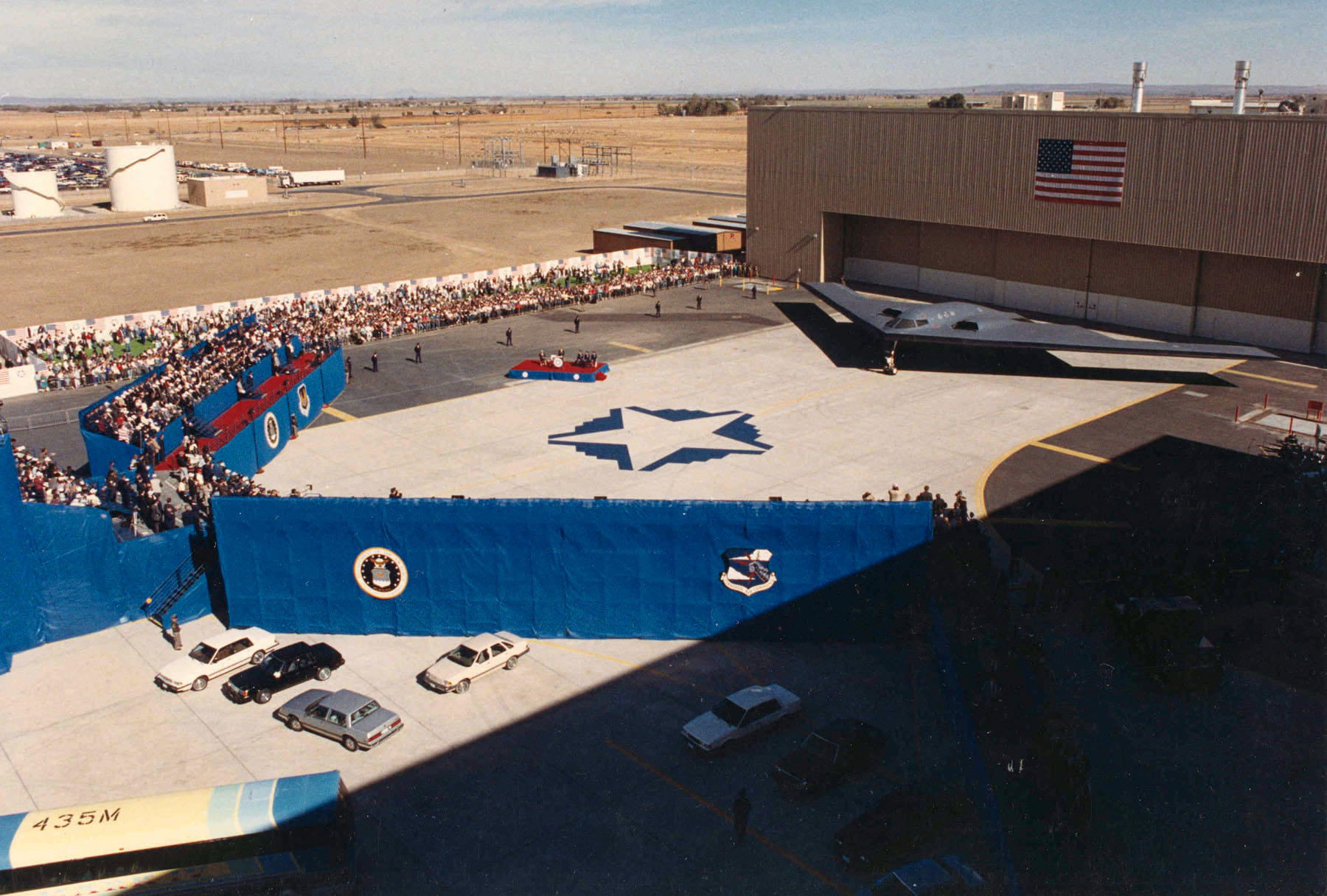
B-2 Spirit Rollout – 22 November 1988. The 420th Flight Test Squadron performed test flights with the B-2.

After carrying out initial tests, AV-1 was used for radar cross section tests. In early 1993, AV-1 was placed in long term storage to await upgrading to full service configuration prior to joining the operational fleet. The second test aircraft (AV-2, 82–1067 "Spirit of Arizona") flew for the first time on 19 October 1990 from Palmdale, landing at Edwards AFB. It was heavily instrumented and served as the loads test aircraft.

AV-3 (82-1068 "Spirit of New York") took to the air for the first time on 18 June 1991. It was the first radar and navigation test aircraft. AV-4 (82-1069 "Spirit of Indiana") followed on 17 April 1992, and AV-5 (82-1070 "Spirit of Ohio") on 5 October 1992. These two planes were used for avionics and weapons testing. The first bomb to be tested with the B-2 was a 2000-lb Mk 84, which was dropped from AV-4 on 12 September 1992. AV-5 was the intended for armament, climatic, and low-observability testing.

On 1 October 1992, the 6520th Test Squadron was consolidated with the 420th Air Refueling Squadron. The next day the consolidated unit was renamed the 420th Test Squadron.

The last development aircraft, AV-6 (82-1071 "Spirit of Mississippi") flew on 2 February 1993. It was used for technical order validation and for further weapons and avionics testing. By January 1995 the six B-2s had logged more than 2300 hours in the air in more than 490 flights. Terrain-following certification flights were undertaken by AV-4 in September 1996. By January 1997, the B-2 had reached limited operational capability and testing at Edwards was phased down. B-2 flight testing was transferred to the 419th Flight Test Squadron and the squadron was inactivated at the end of 1997.

=== T-38 Talon Flight Testing ===
The 420th was reactivated in 2001 at Phoenix–Mesa Gateway Airport, Arizona (formerly Williams Air Force Base) as the 420th Flight Test Flight. The flight acted as a Northrop T-38 Talon functional check flight organization. The 420th replaced Operating Location E of the 622d Regional Support Group, which originally stood up in May 2000. After the 413th Flight Test Group was created at Robins Air Force Base, Georgia, the flight was reassigned to the group in 2003.

The unit supported Boeing's modification of the T-38C trainer's flight, engine and navigational avionics and the addition of a heads-up display, inertial navigation system, and a flight recorder. The 420th flew depot-level test sorties and acceptance check flights after the upgrades were completed. In addition, pilots brought Talons to Mesa for upgrade and then delivered them to flying units after the work was complete. The squadron was inactivated on 31 October 2007 when the cockpit upgrade program was completed.

=== B-21 Raider Flight Testing ===
In September 2019 it was reported that the squadron would be reactivated to support flight testing of the Northrop Grumman B-21 Raider, reprising a similar role it performed in the development of the B-2. The squadron was reactivated on 4 October 2019.

== Lineage ==
420th Night Fighter Squadron

- Constituted as the 420th Night Fighter Squadron on 25 May 1943

Activated on 1 June 1943
Disbanded on 31 March 1944

- Reconstituted and consolidated with the 420th Air Refueling Squadron on 19 September 1985

420th Air Refueling Squadron

Constituted as the 420th Air Refueling Squadron, Fighter-Bomber on 8 December 1953
Activated on 18 March 1954
Redesignated 420th Air Refueling Squadron, Tactical on 8 August 1958
Discontinued and inactivated on 25 March 1964

- Consolidated with the 420th Night Fighter Squadron on 19 September 1985 as the 420th Air Refueling Squadron, Heavy
- Consolidated with the 6520th Test Squadron on 1 October 1992

420th Flight Test Flight

- Designated as the 6520th Test Squadron and activated on 10 March 1989
- Consolidated with the 420th Air Refueling Squadron on 1 October 1992

Redesignated 420th Test Squadron on 2 October 1992
Redesignated 420th Flight Test Squadron on 1 March 1994
Inactivated on 30 December 1997

- Redesignated 420th Flight Test Flight on 24 September 2001

Activated in the Reserve on 1 October 2001
Inactivated on 31 October 2007

- Redesignated 420th Flight Test Squadron in 2019

Activated on 4 October 2019

=== Assignments ===
- Air Defense Department, Army Air Forces School of Applied Tactics, 1 June 1943 (attached to 481st Night Fighter Operational Training Group after 17 July 1943)
- 481st Night Fighter Operational Training Group, 26 July 1943 – 31 March 1944
- Ninth Air Force, 18 March 1954 (attached to 366th Fighter-Bomber Wing until 22 September 1955)
- Third Air Force, 9 October 1955 (attached to 47th Bombardment Wing after 15 March 1960)
- Seventeenth Air Force, 1 July 1961 (remained attached to 47th Bombardment Wing)
- 47th Bombardment Wing, 8 November 1961
- Seventeenth Air Force, 22 June 1962 (attached to 7375th Combat Support Group after c. June 1962)
- 7375th Combat Support Group, 1 October 1962 – 25 March 1964
- 6510th Test Group (later 412th Test Group), 10 March 1989 – 30 December 1997
- 622d Regional Support Group, 1 October 2001
- 413th Flight Test Group, 1 October 2003 – 31 October 2007

=== Stations ===
- Orlando Army Air Base, Florida, 1 June 1943
- Kissimmee Army Air Field, Florida, 15 June 1943
- Dunnellon Army Air Field, Florida, 20 August 1943
- Hammer Field, California, 18 January – 31 March 1944
- Alexandria Air Force Base (later England Air Force Base), Louisiana, 18 March 1954 – 22 September 1955
- RAF Sculthorpe, England, 9 October 1955 – 25 March 1964
- Edwards Air Force Base, California, 10 March 1989 – 30 December 1997
- Phoenix-Mesa Gateway Airport, Arizona 1 October 2001 – 31 October 2007

=== Aircraft ===
- AT-11 Kansan, 1943–1944
- A-20 Havoc, 1943–1944
- P-70 Havoc, 1943–1944
- BT-13 Valiant, 1943–1944
- C-78 Bobcat, 1943–1944
- P/YP-61 Black Widow, 1944.
- KB-29 Superfortress (Tanker), 1954–1959
- KB-50 Superfortress (Tanker), 1956–1964
- B-2 Spirit, 1989–1997
- T-38 Talon, 2001–2007

=== Awards ===
Award streamer	Award	Dates	Notes
	Air Force Outstanding Unit Award	1 January 1995 – 31 December 1995	420th Flight Test Squadron
	Air Force Outstanding Unit Award	1 January 1996 – 31 December 1996	420th Flight Test Squadron
	Air Force Outstanding Unit Award	1 January 1997 – 30 December 1997	420th Flight Test Squadron

== See also ==
- List of United States Air Force test squadrons
- Operational - Replacement Training Units
