= 421st Fighter Squadron =

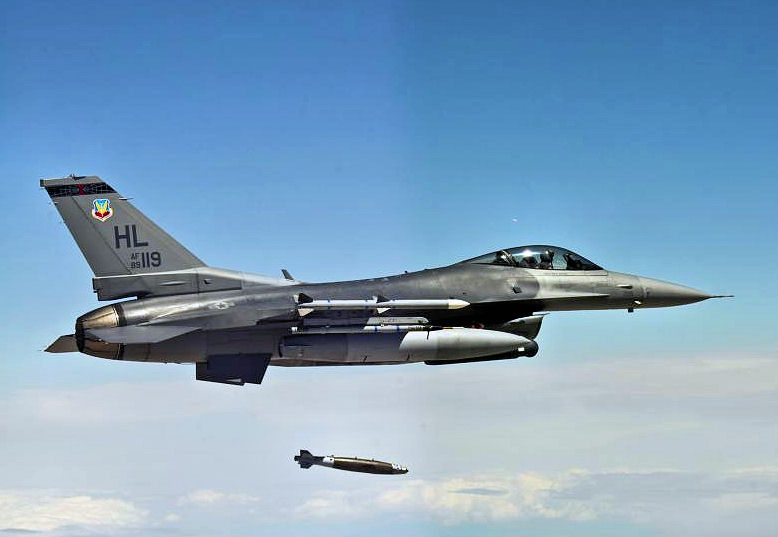
- 421st Squadron F-16C releases a GBU-31 during a Combat Hammer mission (Note: Aircraft is General Dynamics F-16C block 40 Fighting Falcon serial 89-2119 on 11 May 2011.)
- Active: 1943-1947; 1962-present
- Country: United States
- Branch: United States Air Force
- Type: Squadron
- Role: Fighter
- Part of: 388th Operations Group
- Garrison/HQ: Hill Air Force Base, Utah
- Nickname(s): Black Widows
- Motto(s): Kiss of Death, Widows Kill
- Colors: Red, Black, White, Grey
- Mascot(s): Black Widow
- Engagements: World War II Asia-Pacific Theatre; Vietnam War; 1991 Gulf War; Armed Forces Expeditionary; * Operation Northern Watch * Operation Southern Watch: Global War on Terrorism Expeditionary; * Operation Enduring Freedom * Operation Iraqi Freedom

- Decorations: Presidential Unit Citation (3x); Air Force Outstanding Unit Award with Combat "V" Device (7x); Republic of Vietnam Gallantry Cross with Palm; Philippines Presidential Unit Citation

Commanders
- Current commander: Lt. Col. Heguy "Mace”

Insignia
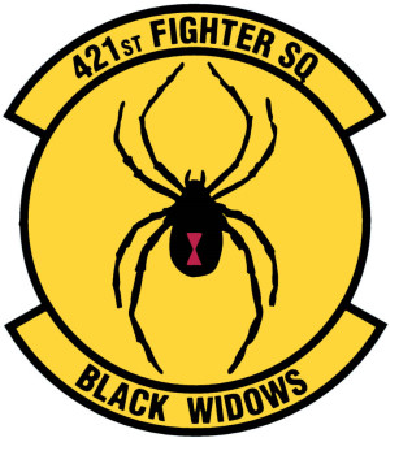
- Emblem of the 421st Fighter Squadron (approved 27 October 1977)

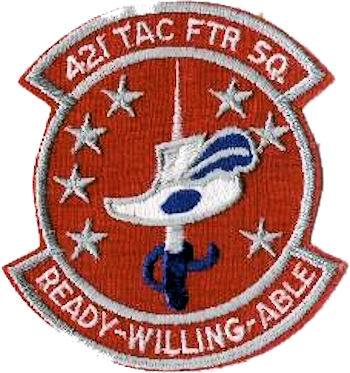
- Patch with 421st Tactical Fighter Squadron emblem (approved 30 October 1964)

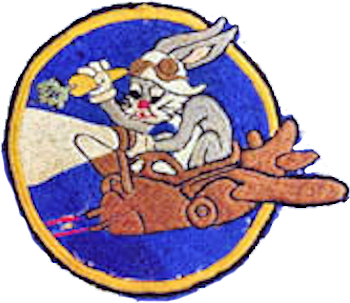
- 421st Night Fighter Squadron emblem (approved 13 December 1943) (Note: From a photo of an emblem painted on a P-61 of the 421st Night Fighter Squadron.)

The 421st Fighter Squadron is part of the 388th Fighter Wing at Hill Air Force Base, Utah. It operates the Lockheed Martin F-35A aircraft conducting air superiority missions. The squadron is one of the most decorated fighter squadrons in the United States Air Force, being awarded three Presidential Unit Citations and seven Air Force Outstanding Unit Awards for Valor in Combat.

The unit was originally formed as the 421st Night Fighter Squadron in 1943. After training, it was deployed to Fifth Air Force and ordered to New Guinea to provide air defense interceptor protection against Japanese night air raids on USAAF airfields. It later served in the Philippines Campaign where in addition to night interceptor missions it also flew day and night interdiction missions against enemy troop movements, bridges and other targets of opportunity. It later served on Okinawa and in Occupied Japan where it was inactivated in 1947.

It was reactivated by Tactical Air Command in 1962 as the 421st Tactical Fighter Squadron. Equipped with Republic F-105 Thunderchiefs, it deployed to Southeast Asia and engaged in combat operations over North Vietnam. It returned to the United States and was re-equipped with the McDonnell F-4D Phantom II and returned to Southeast Asia for a second and later third tour of duty in the Vietnam War. It was one of the first USAF squadrons equipped with the F-16A Fighting Falcon in 1980; and went on to serve in the 1991 Gulf War. In recent years, the squadron has deployed to the United States Air Forces Central Command, engaging in combat during Operation Enduring Freedom and Operation Iraqi Freedom.

== Overview ==
The 421st is one of the longest operating General Dynamics F-16 Fighting Falcon units together with its sister squadron assigned to the 388th, the 4th Fighter Squadron. It trains to deploy worldwide to conduct Day/Night air superiority and precision strike sorties employing laser-guided and inertially aided munitions during contingencies and combat.

The squadron's nickname "Black Widows" is derived from its World War II combat heritage of flying the Northrop P-61 Black Widow night fighter, the only dedicated night fighter produced by the United States during the war.

== History ==
=== World War II ===
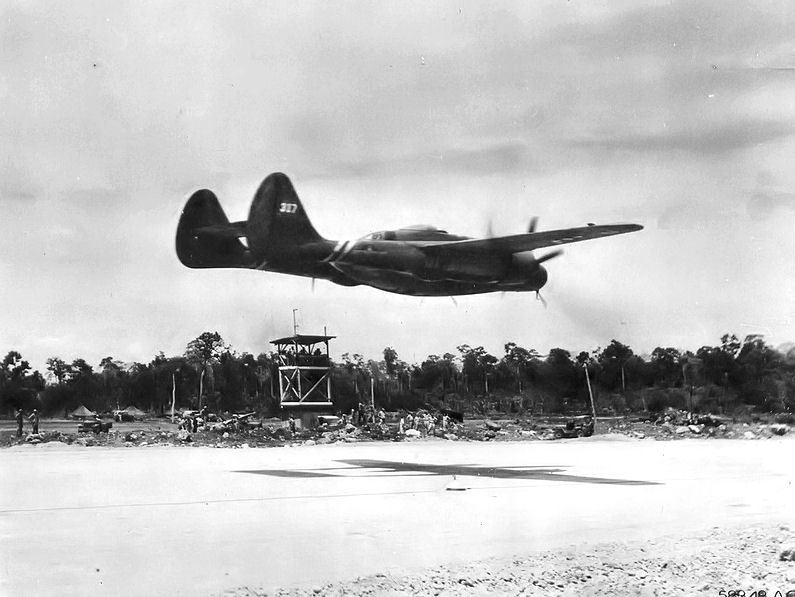
P-61B-20-NO Black Widow 43-8317 landing at Tacloban Airfield, Tacloban, Leyte, 8 February 1945.

The squadron was activated on 1 May 1943, as the 421st Night Fighter Squadron, in Orlando Army Air Base, Florida. After several months of training with Douglas P-70 Havoc night fighters, the squadron was deployed to the Southwest Pacific, arriving at Milne Bay, Papua New Guinea, and assumed duty with the 5th Fighter Command, 5th Air Force, in the Southwest Pacific.

However, it was found that the P-70 was not very successful in actual combat interception of Japanese fighters at night. It was issued Lockheed P-38H Lightnings stock day fighters with no radar or any other equipment for finding the enemy at night. The Lightning pilots would wait until the enemy was over a target and, hopefully, illuminated by the defender's searchlights. They would then try to pick out the outline of the enemy aircraft and intercept. This method had its dangers since the P-38 was subjecting itself to antiaircraft fire from defenders as well as gunners aboard the Japanese bombers. The squadron received the P-61 Black Widow to replace the P-38s/P-70s in June 1944. The squadron and its detachments moved several times throughout New Guinea providing cover for U.S. Army assault landings, shipping reconnaissance while protecting the various new air bases.

In October 1944, squadron personnel moved to the Philippines, and after bitter fighting, established a camp at San Marcelino Field in February 1945. During the next 6 months, the squadron's activity was intense aerial combat and bombing missions became an everyday occurrence.

Following the Japanese surrender, the squadron became part of the occupation forces at Itazuke Air Base, Japan. On 20 February 1947, the squadron was inactivated, with 16 victories to its credit.

=== Vietnam War ===
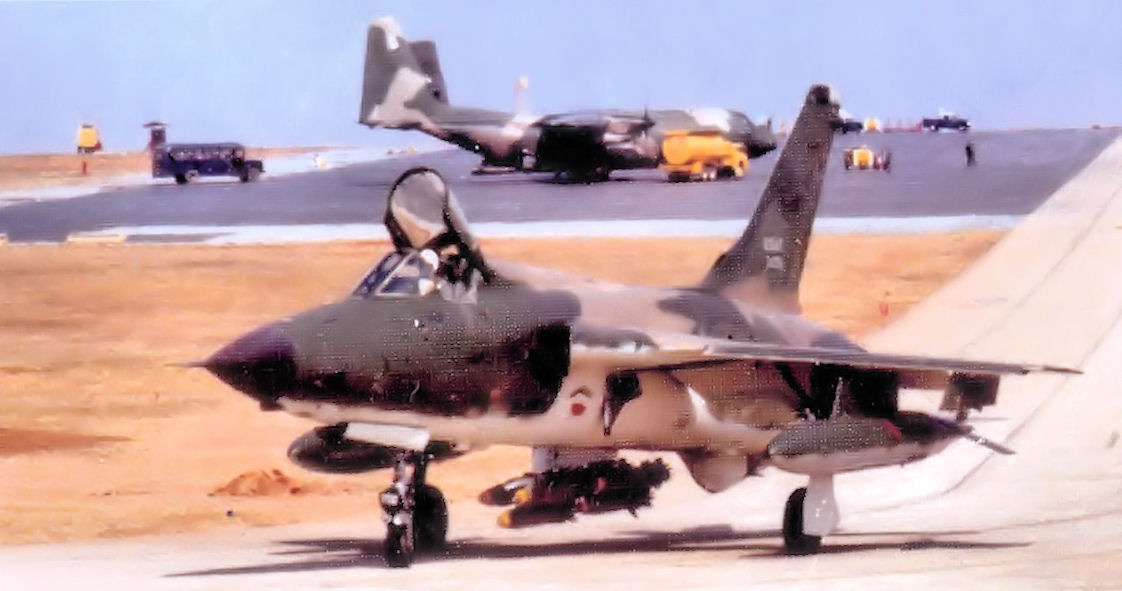
421st Tactical Fighter Squadron F-105 Thunderchief (Note: Note the new southeast Asia camouflage paint motif, and no tail code.)

Fifteen years later, on 8 July 1962, the 421st Tactical Fighter Squadron was activated and named a tactical fighter squadron with the 355th Tactical Fighter Wing at George Air Force Base, California. It was equipped with the Republic F-105D Thunderchief, a large heavy supersonic fighter-bomber. Once training was completed with the aircraft at George, the squadron and its wing was moved to its permanent duty station, McConnell Air Force Base, Kansas.

At McConnell, the wing took on a NATO commitment, its mission being the delivery of tactical nuclear weapons in case of a war in Europe. For the next two years, the squadron deployed frequently, performing rotational TDY duties at Incirlik Air Base, Turkey. In the spring of 1965, the squadron deployed to Pacific Air Forces, spending five months at Kadena Air Base, Okinawa. While at Kadena, flight crews rotated to a sister squadron in Southeast Asia enabling squadron members to gain combat experience.

The requirements of the Vietnam War led to the 421st to change its mission from nuclear weapons delivery to that of being a tactical bomber over North Vietnam. From April 1966 to April 1967 the 421st was stationed at Korat Royal Thai Air Force Base, Thailand, with the 388th Tactical Fighter Wing. For the next two years, the squadron was stationed with three different stateside wings, though in name only.

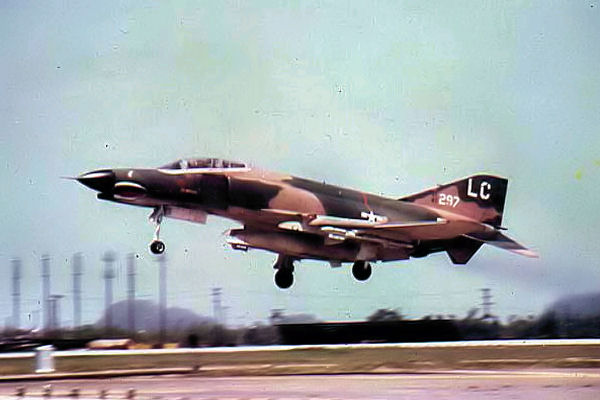
F-4E of the 421st Tactical Fighter Squadron - 1972

On 23 April 1969, the 421st TFS was on deployment to DaNang AB, Republic of Vietnam, when they received an order while at Hickam AFB in Hawaii, to redeploy to Kunsan AB, Korea due to the downing of a Navy EC-121 on April 15, 1969 Kunsan Air Base, They arrived in Kunsan with their factory fresh McDonnell Douglas F-4E Phantom IIs. Their mission was air defense following the downing of a Navy EC-121 off the coast of North Korea. An F-100D Air Guard squadron from the US relieved the 421st on 21 June 1969, and they transferred to DaNang AB, Republic of Vietnam to resume their originally scheduled mission and remained there through October 1972, flying 15,420 combat missions in the F-4D. On 31 October 1972, the unit moved to Udorn Royal Thai Air Force Base, Thailand, with the 432d Tactical Reconnaissance Wing.

At Udorn, the squadron was briefly re-equipped with the RF-4C reconnaissance version of the Phantom, before being equipped with the F-4E, the last and most advanced version of the Phantom to fly in Southeast Asia. Combat missions continued in Southeast Asia until the cease-fire on 28 January 1973, in Laos until February 1973, and in Cambodia until 15 August 1973.

The squadron then changed to a training environment and participated in many tactical air exercises. During April 1975, squadron pilots participated in the evacuation of Phnom Penh, Cambodia and Saigon, Republic of Vietnam. In May 1975, the squadron flew in tactical missions associated with the recovery of the SS Mayagüez and its crew.

For its efforts in Southeast Asia, the 421st earned three Presidential Unit Citations, six Air Force Outstanding Unit Awards with Combat "V" Devices, the Republic of Vietnam Gallantry Cross with Palm, and flies 12 campaign streamers for Southeast Asian duty.

=== Cold War ===
In December 1975, the 388 Wing moved from Thailand to Hill Air Force Base, and by 30 June 1977, the 421st was combat ready with F-4D Phantom IIs. On 29 December 1978, the squadron was reduced to zero aircraft, yet remained with the 388th until June 1980 when they received their first General Dynamics F-16 Fighting Falcon. The 421st was the second of the Hill units to receive the F-16. New aircraft came straight from the General Dynamics production line at Fort Worth .

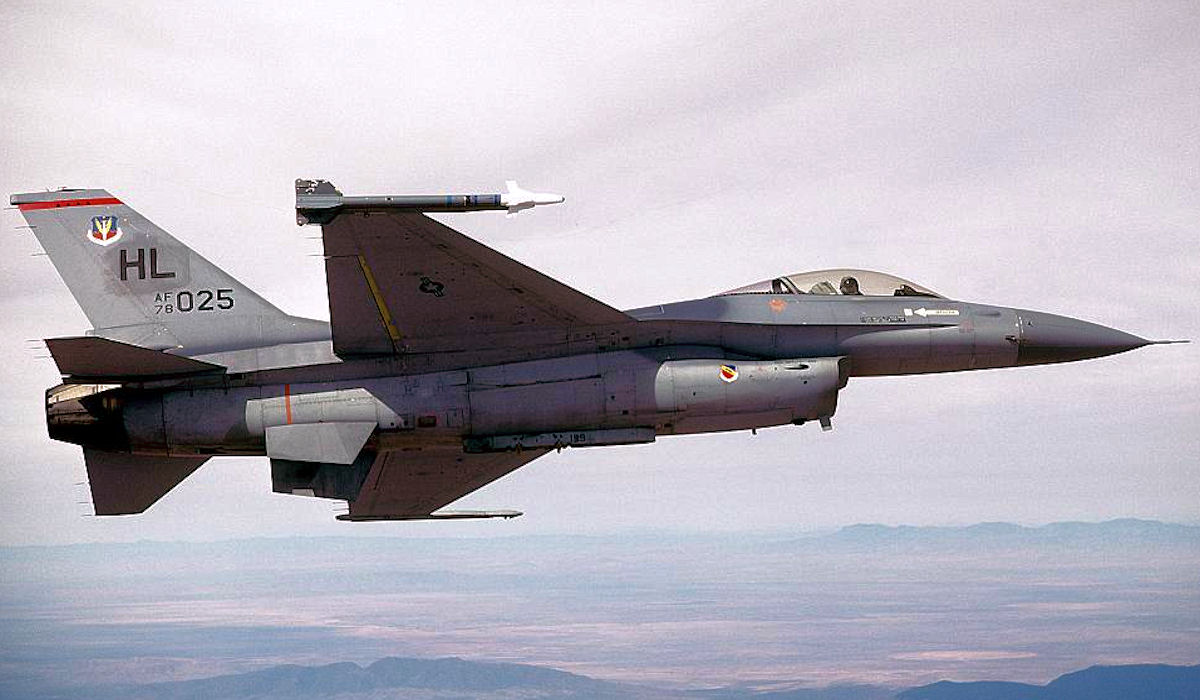
F-16A Block 5 Fighting Falcon (Note: Aircraft is General Dynamics F-16A Block 5 Fighting Falcon serial 78-25.)

After attaining combat readiness in the F-16, the 421 TFS was tasked to provide formal training for pilots transitioning to the F-16. In November 1981, the squadron deployed to Egypt where it trained Egyptian pilots in exercise Bright Star. From 1 July 1982, until 1 January 1983, the 421 TFS had trained pilots from Britain, Egypt, and Pakistan, as well as U.S. pilots. In 1983 the squadron formally became a Replacement Training Unit. Squadron deployment locations in the 1980s included Egypt, Oman, Norway, Italy, Ecuador, Denmark, Saudi Arabia, and Kuwait. By the beginning of 1984 the 421st TFS dropped the training role completely leaving the 16th Tactical Fighter Training Squadron as the sole training unit at Hill AFB. During the 1980s the 421st was tasked with conventional air-to-ground and attack. Since the importance of the squadron for this task, newer, updated aircraft came to the squadron that were better designed for the mission than the initial group of F-16s. By 1983 the squadron was completely converted to the block 15 aircraft.

The 421st kept flying with these airframes up until 1990. It was then that they started receiving the upgraded F-16CG Block 40 aircraft the second squadron to do so. With this newer version the squadron was able to conduct its missions with even greater accuracy and also added a night-time possibility to it.

In the early 1990s, the introduction of the Low Altitude Navigation and Targeting Infrared for Night (LANTIRN) pod to the 421st. The squadron started operating this pod in mid 1990 as one of the first USAF squadrons to deploy it in an operational environment. With tensions rising in the Middle East the squadron had to adopt this new weapon system very quickly and had to train in very different scenarios then previously flown in a couple of months time.

=== Modern era ===
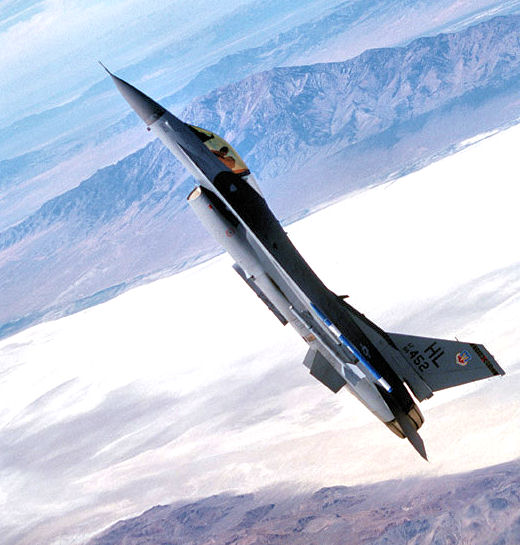
421st Fighter Squadron F-16C Block 40C (Note: Aircraft is General Dynamics F-16C Fighting Falcon Block 40C Fighting Falcon serial 88-452.)

On 30 August 1990, the squadron deployed to the Persian Gulf in support of Operations Desert Shield and Desert Storm. On 20 March 1991, the 421st redeployed to its home at Hill Air Force Base after distinguishing itself by flying 1,300 combat sorties (1,200 at night) without any losses or battle damage. Since then, the 421st FS has deployed around the world in support of various operations, including Operations Southern Watch, Northern Watch, and Noble Eagle.

In August 2002, the 421st transferred all its maintenance personnel to the 388th Aircraft Maintenance Squadron as part of the wing reorganization. The 421st deployed with 388th Squadron's 421st Aircraft Maintenance Unit (AMU) to Al Udeid Air Base, Qatar, to support Operation Enduring Freedom and Operation Iraqi Freedom from May to September 2003.

The 421st and AMU became the first-ever active duty F-16 squadron to deploy to Balad Air Base, Iraq, however the 107th Fighter Squadron of the Michigan Air National Guard from Selfridge ANG Base Michigan was the first F-16 squadron to fly out Iraq in 2003. The 421st was supporting Operation Iraqi Freedom from August 2004 to January 2005. The squadron flew over 1,300 sorties during its first deployment to Iraq. The squadron then returned to Balad Air Base from May to September 2006 flying 1,400 sorties and 6,400 hours.

On 22 June 2009 a single-seat F-16 from the squadron on a training mission, a nighttime high-angle strafing run, crashed in the Utah Test and Training Range. The pilot, Captain George Bryan Houghton, 28, was killed. A USAF mishap investigation concluded that the cause of the crash was pilot error, finding that Houghton's inexperience and apparent disorientation during the strafing run caused him to fly the aircraft into the ground.

==== 2013 Sequestration ====
Air Combat Command officials announced a stand down and reallocation of flying hours for the rest of the fiscal year 2013 due to mandatory budget cuts. The across-the board spending cuts, called sequestration, took effect 1 March when Congress failed to agree on a deficit-reduction plan.

Squadrons either stood down on a rotating basis or kept combat ready or at a reduced readiness level called "basic mission capable" for part or all of the remaining months in fiscal 2013. This affected the 421st Fighter Squadron with a reduction of its flying hours, placing it into a basic mission capable status from 5 April-30 September 2013.

== Lineage ==
- Constituted as the 421st Night Fighter Squadron on 30 April 1943

Activated on 1 May 1943
Inactivated on 20 February 1947

- Redesignated 421st Tactical Fighter Squadron and activated on 13 April 1962 (not organized)

Organized on 8 July 1962
Redesignated 421st Fighter Squadron on 1 November 1991.

=== Assignments ===
- Air Defense Department, Army Air Forces School of Applied Tactics, 1 May 1943

Attached to 481st Night Fighter Operational Training Group, 17 July–7 November 1943

- Fifth Air Force, 23 December 1943
- V Fighter Command, 29 December 1943 (Note: Apparently the squadron was attached to other organizations for operations.)
- 86th Fighter Wing, c. 1 February 1945
- V Fighter Command, April 1945
- 315th Composite Wing, 31 May 1946 – 20 February 1947
- Tactical Air Command, 13 April 1962 (not organized)
- 355th Tactical Fighter Wing, 8 July 1962
- 835th Air Division, 8 November 1965
- 6234th Tactical Fighter Wing, 20 November 1965
- 388th Tactical Fighter Wing, 8 April 1966
- 15th Tactical Fighter Wing, 25 April 1967
- 4531st Tactical Fighter Wing, 1 July 1967
- 23d Tactical Fighter Wing, 14 December 1967
- 366th Tactical Fighter Wing, 16 April 1969
- 432d Tactical Reconnaissance Wing (later 432d Tactical Fighter Wing), 31 October 1972
- 388th Tactical Fighter Wing (later 388th Fighter Wing), 23 December 1975

Attached to 388th Tactical Fighter Wing (Deployed), (later 388th Tactical Fighter Wing (Provisional)), 28 August 1990 – 27 March 1991

- 388th Operations Group, 1 December 1991–present

=== Stations ===
- Orlando Army Air Base, Florida, 1 May 1943
- Kissimmee Army Air Field, Florida 4 October–7 November 1943
- Gurney Airfield, Milne Bay, Papua New Guinea, 4–27 January 1944
- Nadzab Airfield, New Guinea, 27 January–28 June 1944

Detachment at Wakde Island, 28 May – 21 September 1944

- Owi Airfield, Schouten Islands, Netherlands East Indies, 28 June – 25 October 1944
- Tacloban Airfield, Leyte, Philippines, 25 October 1944 – 8 February 1945

Detachment of air echelon at Peleliu, Palau Group, 3 December 1944 – 11 January 1945

- San Marcelino Field, Luzon, Philippines, 26 April–5 August 1945

Detachment at Tacloban Airfield, Leyte, Philippines, 9 February–23 March 1945

- Clark Field, Luzon, Philippines, 26 April–5 August 1945
- Ie Shima Airfield, Ryuku Islands, 8 August–25 November 1945
- Itazuke Air Base, Japan, Itazuke, Japan, 25 November 1945 – 20 February 1947
- George Air Force Base, California, 8 July 1962
- McConnell Air Force Base, Kansas, 21 July 1964 – November 1965

Deployed at Incirlik Air Base, Turkey (18 September–19 November 1964), Kadena Air Base, Okinawa (7 April–27 August 1965)

- Korat Royal Thai Air Force Base, Thailand, 20 November 1965
- MacDill Air Force Base, Florida, 25 April 1967
- Homestead Air Force Base, Florida, 1 July 1967
- McConnell Air Force Base, Kansas, 14 December 1967
- Da Nang Air Base, South Vietnam, 16 April 1969

Deployed at Kunsan Air Base, South Korea (23 April–26 June 1969)

- Takhli Royal Thai Air Force Base, Thailand, 27 June 1972
- Udorn Royal Thai Air Force Base, Thailand, 31 October 1972
- Clark Air Base, Luzon, Philippines, 13–23 December 1975
- Hill Air Force Base, Utah, 23 Dec 1975 – present)

Deployed to: Mindhad AB, United Arab Emirates, 30 August 1990-20 March 1991
Deployed to: Prince Sultan Air Base, Saudi Arabia, December 1994-February 1995; April–June 1996; 2 September-25 October 1997

Known Air Expeditionary Force Deployments

- Operation Southern Watch

Prince Sultan AB, Saudi Arabia, August 1998-September 1998
Ahmed Al Jabber AB, Kuwait, September-9 December 1999

- Operation Northern Watch

Incirlik Air Base, Turkey. December 2000-January 2001

- Operation Iraqi Freedom

Al Udeid Air Base, Qatar, May–September 2003
Balad AB, Iraq, August 2004-January 2005; May–September 2006; 25 December 2007-May 2008

- Operation Enduring Freedom

Bagram AB, Afghanistan, July–October 2009

=== Aircraft ===
- Douglas P-70 Havoc (1943–1944)
- Lockheed P-38H Lightning (1944–1945)
- Northrop P-61 Black Widow (1944–1947)
- Republic F-105D Thunderchief (1963–1967)
- McDonnell F-4D Phantom II (1969–1972)
- McDonnell RF-4C Phantom II, 1972
- McDonnell F-4E Phantom II, 1972-1975
- General Dynamics F-16A Fighting Falcon, 1980-1990
- General Dynamics F-16C Fighting Falcon, 1990–2017
- Lockheed Martin F-35A Lightning II, 2017–Present
