= Army Air Forces Tactical Center =

- Active: 1942–2012
- Country: United States of America
- Branch: United States Army Air Forces
- Role: Professional Military Education

Commanders
- Notable commanders: Brig Gen Hume Peabody

The Army Air Forces Tactical Center was a major command and military training organization of the United States Army Air Forces during World War II. It trained cadres from newly formed units in combat operations under simulated field conditions around which new combat groups would be formed. It was established as the Army Air Forces School of Applied Tactics (AAFSAT) in 1942 and redesignated the following year.

In addition to its training function, the school also developed as a tactical doctrine development center, assuming the functions formerly assigned the Air Corps Tactical School. In June 1946, the center became the Army Air Forces Proving Ground Command.

== History ==
=== Background ===
As the threat of entry of the United States into World War II increased, the United States Army decided to close the Air Corps Tactical School in 1940 in order to use its experienced personnel at headquarters, and in expanded training and tactical units. As a result, the responsibility for the development and change to tactics for Air Corps units was scattered among various Air Corps units. Moreover, no single element of the Air Staff or special committee was responsible for overseeing tactical doctrine for the Army's air elements. The field organizations primarily responsible for development of tactics and associated doctrine were the Army Air Force Board, the Air Defense Board, the Fighter Command School and the Army Air Forces Proving Ground. In addition, the splitting of existing combat groups into cadres for new groups had become impracticable as the number of new groups increased. At the entry of the United States into World War II on 7 December 1941, the Army Air Forces (AAF) had expanded to 67 groups from a pre-1939 total of 15, but approximately half were paper units just forming. The entry into the war meant an immediate significant increase in the numbers of new combat groups, expanding to 269 groups by the end of 1943.

=== Formation of the Army Air Forces School of Applied Tactics ===
Headquarters USAAF originally intended that four tactical schools be developed across the United States, one each for air defense, air service, air support and bombardment. However "to save administrative costs and physical outlay" and to facilitate coordination between the schools, all four would be consolidated at a single location. Orlando Army Air Base, Florida was chosen 1 November 1942, primarily because it was already the location of Fighter Command School, which would be subordinated to the Army Air Forces School of Applied Tactics (AAFSAT). The AAF determined this organization would conduct tactical development and training and provide tactical training for flyers who were preparing to deploy to theaters of operation. The commandant of AAFSAT was Brigadier General Hume Peabody, formerly the assistant commandant of the Air Corps Tactical School.

The Fighter Command School became AAFSAT's Air Defense Department at once. The 91st Service Group at Fort Dix Army Air Field moved to Orlando and became the Air Service Department. 5th Interceptor Command moved from San Francisco and became the Interceptor Command School. (Note: The school quickly adopted the former name of the Air Defense Department and became the Fighter Command School.) The other two departments, Air Support and Bombardment were built up from scratch AAFSAT was organized into three directorates: Tactical Development, School Activities, and Demonstration Air Force, with three combat groups acting as both school units and demonstration air force units. The Directorate of School Activities was responsible for the four functional departments.

The school officially opened 12 November 1942. An important component was the Army Air Forces Board, which supervised developmental projects. This board also assigned developmental projects to AAFSAT's departments, and had two subordinate boards, the Air Defense Board and, after April 1943, the AAF Equipment Board. Although the Board had been operating before AAFSAT was activated, it only became official in July, when the school became the AAF Tactical Center. It was reassigned from the center directly to Headquarters, AAF in October 1943.although the commandant of the center remained a member of the board.

=== Army Air Forces Tactical Center ===
In October 1943, AAFSAT was reorganized and became the Army Air Forces Tactical Center. A "new" AAFSAT was organized as one of the center's subordinate units. The first group receiving AAFSAT training to deploy overseas was the 390th Bombardment Group in July 1943, based in England with the Eighth Air Force. By September 1945, the AAF Center had trained 54,000 personnel and the cadres of 44 bombardment groups.

During 1943-1945 the AAF Tactical Center operated a combat simulation facility in Florida. Units and airfields were established throughout an 8,000-square-mile (21,000 km^{2}) area of north central Florida designated a mock "war theater" stretching roughly from Tampa to Titusville to Starke to Apalachicola in which war games were conducted. AAFSAT also had a bombing range at Ocala AAF, a service center at Leesburg AAF, and an air depot at Pinecastle Army Air Field.

=== Transfer and transition ===
Due to a major reorganization of the Tactical Center and a change in the types of courses conducted by the institution, the Army Air Forces redesignated the "new" AAFSAT as the Army Air Forces School on 1 June 1945, while the Tactical Center dropped the "Tactical" from its name and became the AAF Center. Following the end of World War II, in preparation for its post-war educational operations, the AAF moved the AAF School from Orlando to Maxwell Field, Alabama on 29 November 1945 and assigned it directly to Headquarters, AAF. Having lost its developmental function, the AAF Center moved to Eglin Field in March 1946 and became the Army Air Forces Proving Ground Command.

== Lineage ==
- Established as the Army Air Forces School of Applied Tactics on 27 October 1942

Activated on 12 November 1942
Redesignated Army Air Forces Tactical Center on 16 October 1943
Redesignated Army Air Forces Center on 1 June 1945
Redesignated Army Air Forces Proving Ground Command on 8 March 1946
Redesignated Air Proving Ground Command on 10 July 1946 (Note: This unit is not related to the Proving Ground Command, which was activated on 15 May 1941 at Orlando Army Air Base as the Air Corps Proving Ground, moved to Eglin Field in June 1941, was redesignated Proving Ground Command on 1 April 1942 and was disbanded on 1 June 1945.)
Redesignated Air Materiel Proving Ground on 20 January 1948
Redesignated Air Proving Ground on 3 March 1948
Redesignated Air Proving Ground Command on 20 December 1951
Redesignated Air Proving Ground Center on 1 December 1957
Redesignated Armament Development and Test Center on 15 July 1968
Redesignated Armament Division on 1 October 79 (Note: This unit is not related to the Armament Division, which was activated as the Air Materiel Armament Test Center at Eglin AFB on 14 December 1949 and assigned to Air Materiel Command, redesignated Armament Test Division and reassigned to Air Research and Development Command c. 5 January 1951, redesignated Air Force Armament Center on 26 December 1951, Armament Division on 1 December 1957 and inactivated on 5 February 1958.)
Redesignated Munitions Systems Division on 15 March 1989
Redesignated Air Force Development Test Center on 15 July 1990
Redesignated Air Armament Center on 1 October 1998
Inactivated on 1 October 2012

=== Assignments ===
- United States Army Air Forces (later United States Air Force), 27 October 1942
- Air Materiel Command, 20 January 1948
- United States Air Force, 1 June 1948
- Air Research and Development Command (later Air Force Systems Command), 1 December 1957
- Air Force Materiel Command, 1 July 1992 – 1 October 2012

=== Stations ===
- Orlando Army Air Base, Florida, 12 November 1942
- Eglin Field (later Eglin Air Force Base), Florida, 8 March 1946 – 1 October 2012

=== School units ===
The AAF Tactical Center medium and heavy bomber school unit from 31 October 1942 was the 9th Bombardment Group. In February 1943, a close air support school unit, the 415th Bombardment Group was added. The fighter school unit from 23 March 1943 was the 50th Fighter Group. Night Fighter training initially began with the 50th Group's 81st Fighter Squadron, but by 1943 was concentrated in the 481st Night Fighter Operational Training Group.

However, the AAF was finding that standard military units like these groups, based on relatively inflexible tables of organization not well adapted to the training mission. Accordingly, it adopted a more functional system in the spring of 1944 in which each base was organized into a separate numbered unit. In preparation for this reorganization, the 9th Bombardment Group moved to Nebraska, where it was reassigned to Second Air Force to become a Boeing B-29 Superfortress unit. (Note: Ironically, its new cadre were themselves trained at the Tactical Center in June 1944.) The 50th Fighter Group began to concentrate on training in preparation for deployment to the European Theater of Operations in March 1944, the 481st Night Fighter Operational Training Group continued its mission, but transferred to Fourth Air Force in California in January 1944. The transition to the new organization took place on 14 April 1944.

With a ground school at Orlando Army Air Base, Florida, presenting a two-week academic course, AAFSAT also taught a two-week field course utilizing eleven training airfields in Florida representing all conditions likely to be found in combat, from bare fields to prepared bomber air bases having 10,000-foot (3,000 m) runways.

=== Components ===
Groups

- 9th Bombardment Group

1st Bombardment Squadron (Boeing B-17 Flying Fortress)

Orlando Army Air Base, 31 October-15 December 1942;25 February-3 March 1944
Brooksville Army Air Field, 15 December 1942 – 25 February 1944

5th Bombardment Squadron, (Consolidated B-24 Liberator), (North American B-25 Mitchell)

Orlando Army Air Base, 31 October 1942 – 15 April 1943
Pinecastle Army Air Field, 15 April 1943-7 January 1944;13 February-9 March 1944
Brooksville Army Air Field, 7 January-13 February 1944

99th Bombardment Squadron, (North American B-25 Mitchell), (Martin B-26 Marauder)

Orlando Army Air Base, 31 October 1942 – 5 February 1943, 25 February-9 March 1944
Montbrook Army Air Field, 5 February-14 November 1943
Kissimmee Army Air Field, 14 November 1943 – 5 January 1944
Brooksville Army Air Field, 5 January-25 February 1944

430th Bombardment Squadron, (Consolidated B-24 Liberator), (North American B-25 Mitchell), (Martin B-26 Marauder)

Orlando Army Air Base, 31 October 1942 – 6 January 1944; 25 February-6 March 1944
Brooksville Army Air Field, 6 January-25 February 1944

- 50th Fighter Group

10th Fighter Squadron, (Curtiss P-40 Warhawk)

Orlando Army Air Base, 18 March 1942-4 January 1943;29 January-13 March 1944
Zephyrhills Army Air Field 4 January 1943 – 29 January 1944

81st Fighter Squadron, (Curtiss P-40 Warhawk)

Orlando Army Air Base, 22 March 1942 – 18 June 1943; 1 February-13 March 1944
Cross City Army Air Field, 18 June 1943 – 1 February 1944

313th Fighter Squadron, (Curtiss P-40 Warhawk)

Orlando Army Air Base, 20 March 1942, 5 January 1943; 28 January-13 March 1944
Leesburg Army Air Field, 5 January-17 November 1943
Keystone Army Air Field, 17 November 1943 – 28 January 1944

- 415th Bombardment Group

465th Bombardment Squadron, (Douglas A-20 Havoc) (assigned to AAFSAT, 24 January-23 March 1943)

Alachua Army Air Field, 24 January-19 November 1943
Montbrook Army Air Field, 19 November 1943 – 2 March 1944
Orlando Army Air Base, 2–19 March 1944

667th Bombardment Squadron (later 521st Fighter-Bomber Squadron (Douglas A-24 Dauntless), (Bell P-39 Airacobra), (North American A-36 Apache)
Alachua Army Air Field, 15 February 1943 – 2 March 1944
Orlando Army Air Base, 2–19 March 1944

Night fighter units
Air Defense Department, Army Air Forces School of Applied Tactics, 18 February 1943
481st Night Fighter Operational Training Group, 28 July 1943 – 1 January 1944

348th Night Fighter Squadron, (Douglas P-70 Havoc), (North American B-25 Mitchell) (attached to 481st Night Fighter Operational Training Group, 17 July 1943)

Orlando Army Air Base, 4 October 1942 – 19 January 1944

349th Night Fighter Squadron, (Douglas P-70 Havoc), (B-25 Mitchell) (assigned to Night Fighter Division, Army Air Forces School of Applied Tactics, 1 April 1943, attached to: 481st Night Fighter Operational Training Group, 17 July 1943)

Orlando Army Air Base, 4 October 1942 – 1 January 1943
Kissimmee Army Air Field, 1 January 1943 – 15 January 1944

414th Night Fighter Squadron, (Douglas P-70 Havoc) (air echelon attached to VIII Fighter Command after 31 March 1943)

Orlando Army Air Base, 26 January-8 February 1943
Kissimmee Army Air Field, 8 February-21 April 1943

415th Night Fighter Squadron, (P-70/A-20 Havoc) (air echelon attached to VIII Fighter Command after 31 March 1943)

Orlando Army Air Base, 26 January-8 February 1943
Kissimmee Army Air Field, 8 February-21 April 1943

416th Night Fighter Squadron, (Douglas P-70 Havoc)

Orlando Army Air Base, 20 February-26 April 1943

417th Night Fighter Squadron, (Douglas P-70 Havoc)

Orlando Army Air Base, 20 February-5 March 1943

Kissimmee Army Air Field, 5 March-26 April 1943

418th Night Fighter Squadron, (Douglas P-70 Havoc) (attached to 481st Night Fighter Operational Training Group, 17 July-25 September 1943)

Orlando Army Air Base, 1 April-25 August 1943

Kissimmee Army Air Field, 25 August-25 September 1943

419th Night Fighter Squadron, (Douglas P-70 Havoc) (attached to 481st Night Fighter Operational Training Group, 17 July-15 October 1943)

Orlando Army Air Base, 1–22 April 1943
Kissimmee Army Air Field, 22 April-15 October 1943

420th Night Fighter Squadron, (Douglas P-70 Havoc) (attached to: 481st Night Fighter Operational Training Group, 17–26 July 1943)

Orlando Army Air Base, 1 June 1943
Kissimmee Army Air Field, 1 June-20 August 1943
Dunnellon Army Air Field 20 August 1943 – 18 January 1944

421st Night Fighter Squadron, (Douglas P-70 Havoc) (attached to: 481st Night Fighter Operational Training Group, 17 July-7 November 1943)

Orlando Army Air Base, 1 May-1 October 1943
Kissimmee Army Air Field, 4 October-7 November 1943

422d Night Fighter Squadron, (Douglas P-70 Havoc) (assigned to AAF Tactical Center after 8 January 1943)

Orlando Army Air Base, 1 August-3 November 1943; 6 January-13 November 1944
Kissimmee Army Air Field, 3 November 1943 – 6 January 1944

423d Night Fighter Squadron (Douglas P-70 Havoc)

Orlando Army Air Base, 1 October 1943 – 29 January 1944

425th Night Fighter Squadron, (Douglas P-70 Havoc)

Orlando Army Air Base, 1 December 1943 – 20 January 1944

Schools
Fighter Command School, 4 October 1942 – c. 4 January 1943
Army Air Forces School of Applied Tactics (later Army Air Forces School), 21 January 1943 – 29 November 1945

=== Base units ===
- 900th Army Air Forces Base Unit (Army Air Forces School of Applied Tactics), 1 April 44-1 Jun 45

Redescribed (Army Air Forces Tactical Center), 1 Jun 45-3 Jul 45

Orlando AAB

- 901st Army Air Forces Base Unit (Tactical Wing), 29 Mar 44-15 Mar 45

Orlando AAB

- 901st Army Air Forces Base Unit (Army Air Forces Board), 1 Jun 45-3 Jul 45

Orlando AAB

- 902d Army Air Forces Base Unit (Base Complement), 29 March 1944 – 1945

Redescribed (Facilities), 1945 – 20 July 46

Orlando Army Air Base(-Jun 46) Eglin Field

- 903d Army Air Forces Base Unit (Base Services), 29 March–1 June 1944

Orlando Army Air Base

- 903d Army Air Forces Base Unit (Base Complement), 6 September–1 October 44

Redescribed (Bombardment), 1 October 1944 – 1 July 1945
Redesignated 621st Army Air Forces Base Unit

Pinecastle Army Air Field

- 904th Army Air Forces Base Unit (Aviation), 1 April–31 May 44

Orlando Army Air Base

- 904th Army Air Forces Base Unit (Fighter), 6 September–31 December 1944

Redescribed (Base Complement), 1 May–7 July 1945

Kissimmee Army Air Field

- 906th Army Air Forces Base Unit (Bombardment, Heavy), 29 March–6 September 1944

Pinecastle Army Air Field

- 907th Army Air Forces Base Unit (Bombardment, Medium & Light), 1 April–30 June 1944

Orlando Army Air Base

- 909th Army Air Forces Base Unit (Fighter, Single Engine), 29 March–1 April 1944

Alachua Army Air Field(-1944) Orlando Army Air Base

- 910th Army Air Forces Base Unit (Fighter, Two Engine) 29 March–31 May 1944

Leesburg Army Air Field(-May 44) Orlando Army Air Base

- 911th Army Air Forces Base Unit (Service Group, Special), 29 March–30 Jun 1944

Orlando Army Air Base

- 916th Army Air Forces Base Unit (Antiaircraft Artillery Group) 1 May 45-21 March 1946 (transferred to Air Defense Command)

Orlando Army Air Base

- 999th Army Air Forces Base Unit (Hq, AAF Tactical Applications Ctr) 17 April 44 – 31 December 46

Orlando Army Air Base(-Jul 45) Eglin Field

Other

- Army Air Forces Board: 12 November 1942 (1 July 1943) – 8 October 1943

== See also ==
- Orlando Fighter Wing
