= 481st Night Fighter Operational Training Group =

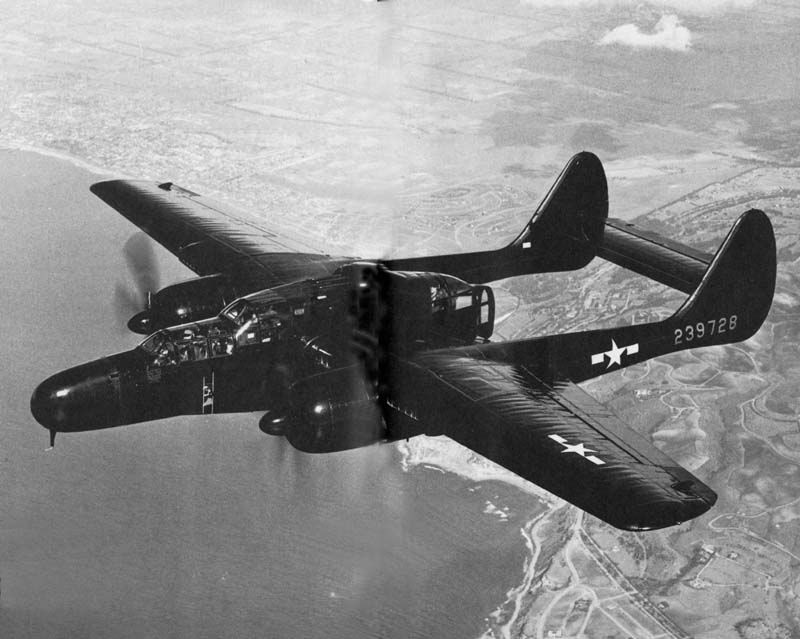
- 420th Night Fighter Squadron P-61 42-39728 in its "stealth" camouflaged shiny black paint, out of place in the daylight skies over California
- Active: 1943–1944
- Country: United States
- Branch: United States Air Force
- Type: Operational training/replacement training unit
- Role: Night fighter training
- Engagements: World War II American Campaign

The 481st Night Fighter Operational Training Group was a unit of the United States Army Air Forces. It was inactivated on 31 March 1944 at Hammer Field, California.

The group was the primary night fighter Operational Training Unit and Replacement Training Unit of the Army Air Forces during World War II. Its mission was to train either new graduates of AAF Training Command advanced flying schools or transition experienced pilots into the Northrop P-61 Black Widow night fighter. It trained them in the flight characteristics of the aircraft and also night fighter interceptor techniques prior to the operational squadrons or replacement pilots being deployed to one of the overseas combat theaters.

== History ==
=== Origins ===
Specialized training in night fighter interceptor tactics began in March 1942 upon the return of Air Corps observers from England prior to the United States' entry into World War II. During World War I, the 1st Pursuit Group 185th Aero Squadron had flown night interception of enemy aircraft, primarily bombers and observation aircraft. It was engaged in combat for less than a month before the 1918 Armistice with Germany.

In the 1920s and 1930s night fighting became the responsibility of regular Pursuit squadrons. These units had enough problems preparing for day war, much less confronting the obstacles of darkness. Yet, despite minimal budgets, pioneering airmen still strove to conquer the night by developing blind-flying techniques, primarily at the Army Air Service’s Engineering Division at McCook Field, and later at the Army Air Corps’ Materiel Division at Wright Field, both in Ohio.

Upon review of the recommendations presented by the observers, the Air Defense Operational Training Unit was established by Third Air Force on 26 March; it was re-designated as the Interceptor Command School on 30 March. Initially established at Key Field, Mississippi, the school was moved to Orlando Army Air Base, Florida.

"To fly these night fighters, the United States needed a different breed of aviator. So difficult and dangerous was the assignment that the [Army Air Forces] relied on volunteers only. Yet the mission was so exciting that there were always plenty of volunteers." V Interceptor Command was given initial responsibility for night training at Orlando. En route to the Philippines in 1941 when the Japanese launched their invasion, the unit was ordered back to Orlando, Florida, to train personnel for defense wings.

=== Operational/Replacement Training ===
==== Army Air Force School of Applied Tactics ====
Night Fighter Training began in July, 1942 at the Fighter Command School, Night Fighter Division, Army Air Force School of Applied Tactics (AAFSAT) at Orlando Army Air Base, Florida. AAFSAT was ordered to develop a training program to produce pilots with night fighting skills. Immediate requirements were to train night fighter pilots for two operational squadrons that were destined for Hawaii and for Panama. By the end of September, AAFSAT had re-designated the program as the Night Fighter Department (Dark) and the first training was carried out by the 50th Pursuit Group, which was assigned to the AAFSAT Fighter Command School.

Initially, the school received a B-18 Bolo and a number of Douglas P-70 Havocs to initiate the program. Production delays at Northrop for the P-61 Black Widow fighter aircraft required the unit to use what it had until the first YP-61s were received in early 1944. In October, it was decided to form specialized night fighter training squadrons, and the 348th and 349th Night Fighter Squadrons were formed, largely from elements of the 50th Fighter Group, 81st Fighter Squadron. In January 1943 the school was expanded from Orlando to Kissimmee Army Air Field due to the expansion of AAFSAT and the Fighter Command School.

At Kissimmee, the first operational night fighter combat squadrons were activated (414th and 415th Night Fighter Squadrons) and Operational Training was carried out. Each squadron was manned with graduates of AAF Training Command's twin-engine flying training and B–25 transition school before beginning night fighter training. Once accepted for night fighter training, the student received eight weeks of training in the Douglas DB7 or Douglas P-70 Havocs. Training consisted of two phases; night flying and night fighting. First came 78 daylight flying hours and 137 hours of ground school, followed by 76 flying hours and 30 hours of ground school in night fighting. Subjects included instruments, airborne radar, night navigation, meteorology, aircraft recognition, searchlight coordination, and ground control radar coordination. Lacking real nighttime combat experience, the Army Air Forces (AAF) created a training program that was ad hoc from the beginning. In all, the night fighter crew would receive 93 hours of instrument flying, 90 hours in a Link trainer, 15 hours of night interceptions, and 10 ground control radar intercepts.

The initial group of four squadrons (414th, 415th, 416th and 417th Night Fighter Squadron) were the first graduates of the hastily organized training program at Orlando. When deployed to England, they were sent with the P-70 night fighters they trained in, however, when they got there, these squadrons were re-equipped with used Bristol Beaufighter Mk VIF radar-equipped nightfighters obtained from Britain under Reverse Lend-Lease. From there they were deployed to their combat assignments with Twelfth Air Force in North Africa to provide protection for the combat airfields in Algeria and Tunisia against Luftwaffe night attacks.

On 1 April 1943, AAFSAT expanded the Night Fighter Division, placing it under the Air Defense Department, and transferred all training from the Night Fighter Section to the new Division. Beginning in May 1943, orders from HQ AAF were received that the training needed to be expanded to accommodate one new night fighter squadron per month. The school at Kissimmee was expanded with a third OTU, the 420th Night Fighter Squadron at Dunnellon Army Air Field.

With the expansion of the Night Fighter Training Division, tasks were divided into three major functions. The 348th Night Fighter Squadron at Orlando provided the initial operational training for new AAF Training Command pilots. The 349th Night Fighter Squadron at Kissimmee carried out two-engine transition training, while the 420th at Dunnellon provided replacement training (RTU). On 15 July 1943, the 481st Night Fighter Operational Training Group was activated to give the school better organizational structure. In September, the first American-built dedicated night fighter, the Northrop YP-61 Black Widow, began to arrive. The YP-61 and a few production P-61As were assigned to the school for both the training programs as well as flight-testing of various turret/gun configurations. Also a second RTU was established in November when the 424th Night Fighter Squadron was formed. The SCR-720 radar operators for the P-61 were first sent to the radar school at Boca Raton Army Air Field then came back to Orlando for flight training. The second group of squadrons (418th, 419th, and 421st NFS) completed their training in the YP-61 and were sent to the Pacific Theater in November and December, operating from bases on Guadalcanal and New Guinea.

==== Fourth Air Force ====
With the arrival of the P-61 Black Widow, it was decided to move the school to California. This would situate the school closer to the Northrop manufacturing plant at Hawthorne, California, and was more efficient because the new squadrons programmed for operational training would be deploying to either the Pacific or China-Burma-India Theaters and would depart from the US west coast. In addition, the Air Staff had decided that AAFSAT should not be in the training business, although the SCR-720 radar training program would remain at Orlando due to its proximity to the basic radar school at Boca Raton. The 481st and its training squadrons were moved to Hammer Field, near Fresno, California on 1 January 1944 and were placed under Fourth Air Force IV Fighter Command.

Under the overall supervision of Fourth Air Force night fighter crews were organized into squadrons and entered three phases of training. Phase One consisted of familiarization training at Bakersfield Municipal Airport. Phase Two was designed to weld pilots and radar operators into teams, and included instruction at Hammer Field, while Phase Three consisted of advanced training, including intensive night flying practice, and took place at Salinas Army Air Field. Each phase lasted approximately one month. Finally, after two more months of organizational training at Santa Ana Army Air Base, the night fighter squadrons were ready for transfer overseas. The third group of squadrons, trained both in Florida and California, were sent to England as part of Ninth Air Force shortly before D–Day. They would be employed after the Normandy Invasion to initially provide night air defense over France.

Three months after the move to California, on 31 March the 481st was disbanded when the AAF found that standard military units, based on relatively inflexible tables of organization were proving less well adapted to the training mission. Accordingly, a more functional system was adopted in which each base was organized into a separate numbered unit during a reorganization of units in the United States.

The 319th Wing, activated on 1 April, took over the duties of the 481st, disbanding the group and all of its squadrons on 31 March. It was replaced by the 450th AAF Base Unit (Night Fighter Replacement Training Unit) as the P-61 RTU, and the squadron designations replaced by letters (A, B, C, D). The 319th Wing completed training for six new Night Fighter Squadrons: the 426th, 427th, 547th, 548th, 549th, and 550th Fighter Squadron, which deployed to both the China and Pacific Theaters. A major new mission for the units was to protect the new XX Bomber Command Boeing B-29 Superfortress bases in China and later in the Marianas from Japanese night attacks.

The unit transitioned to replacement training (RTU) only on 1 December 1944 when the 550th Night Fighter Squadron deployed to New Guinea, ending the Operational Training Mission. The training syllabus was expanded in early 1945 to include training in offensive day and night interdiction missions, as by this point in the war, enemy aircraft attacks at night were becoming less and less frequent. The well-armed P-61s carried out attacks on shipping, railroads and enemy movements, both day and night, with devastating effect. RTU training continued until the end of August 1945 when the school at Hammer Field was inactivated with the end of the war in the Pacific.

=== Lineage ===
- Constituted as 481st Night Fighter Operational Training Group on 12 July 1943

Activated on 15 July 1943
Disbanded on 31 March 1944

- Personnel and equipment reassigned to 450th Army Air Forces Base Unit (Night Fighter Replacement Training Unit), 1 April 1944

Disbanded on 31 August 1945

=== Assignments ===
- Army Air Forces School of Applied Tactics (later Army Air Forces Tactical Center), 15 July 1943
- Fourth Air Force, 1 January – 31 March 1944

=== Components ===
Operational/Replacement Training Units

- 348th Night Fighter Squadron, 17 July 1943 – 26 July 1943 (Attached); 26 July 1943 – 31 March 1944 (OTU/RTU)

Operated from Orlando AAB (1943); Salinas AAF (1944)

- 349th Night Fighter Squadron, 17 July 1943 – 26 July 1943 (Attached); 26 July 1943 – 31 March 1944 (OTU/RTU)

Operated from Kissimmee AAF (1943); Hammer Field (1944)

- 420th Night Fighter Squadron, 17 July 1943 – 26 July 1943 (Attached); 26 July 1943 – 31 March 1944 (RTU)

Operated from Dunnellon AAF; Hammer Field (1944)

- 424th Night Fighter Squadron; 24 November 1943 – 31 March 1944 (RTU)

Operated from Orlando AAB (1943); Hammer Field (1944)

Combat units trained

- 414th Night Fighter Squadron, 26 January – 10 May 1943

Trained by AAFSAT Night Fighter Department (Dark), Deployed to Twelfth Air Force (MTO)

- 415th Night Fighter Squadron, 10 February – 12 May 1943

Trained by AAFSAT Night Fighter Department (Dark), Deployed to Twelfth Air Force (MTO)

- 416th Night Fighter Squadron, 20 February – 11 May 1943

Trained by AAFSAT Night Fighter Department (Dark), Deployed to Twelfth Air Force (MTO)

- 417th Night Fighter Squadron, 20 February – 11 May 1943

Trained by AAFSAT Night Fighter Department (Dark), Deployed to Twelfth Air Force (MTO)

- 418th Night Fighter Squadron, 1 April – 15 November 1943

Initial training by AAFSAT, assigned to 481st 17 July, Deployed to Fifth Air Force (SWPA)

- 419th Night Fighter Squadron, 1 April – 15 November 1943

Initial training by AAFSAT, assigned to 481st 17 July, Deployed to Thirteenth Air Force (CPA)

- 421st Night Fighter Squadron, 30 April – 23 December 1943

Initial training by AAFSAT, assigned to 481st 17 July, Deployed to Fifth Air Force (SWPA)

- 422d Night Fighter Squadron, 1 August 1943 – 7 March 1944

Trained in Florida and California, Deployed to Ninth Air Force (ETO)

- 423d Night Fighter Squadron, 1 October 1943 – 18 April 1944

Trained in Florida and California, to 450th AAFBU, 1 April 1944, Deployed to Ninth Air Force (ETO)

- 425th Night Fighter Squadron, 1 December 1943 – 23 May 1944

Trained in Florida and California, to 450th AAFBU, 1 April 1944, Deployed to [Ninth Air Force (ETO)

- 426th Night Fighter Squadron, 1 January – 11 June 1944

To 450th AAFBU 1 April 1944, Deployed to Fourteenth Air Force (CBI)

- 427th Night Fighter Squadron, 1 February – 11 June 1944

To 450th AAFBU 1 April 1944, Programmed for assignment to Ukraine SSR as part of Operation Frantic. Redeployed first to Fifteenth Air Force in Italy (MTO), then Fourteenth Air Force and Tenth Air Force (CBI)

- 547th Night Fighter Squadron, 1 March – 4 September 1944

To 450th AAFBU 1 April 1944, Deployed to Fifth Air Force (SWPA)

- 548th Night Fighter Squadron, 10 April – 20 October 1944

Trained by 450th AAFBU, Deployed to Seventh Air Force (CPA)

- 549th Night Fighter Squadron, 1 May – 20 October 1944

Trained by 450th AAFBU, Deployed to Seventh Air Force (CPA)

- 550th Night Fighter Squadron, 1 June – 2 December 1944

Trained by 450th AAFBU, Deployed to Thirteenth Air Force (SPA)

(Note: the 6th Night Fighter Squadron was trained and equipped in Hawaii)

=== Stations ===
- Orlando Army Air Base, Florida, 15 July 1943

Also operated from: Kissimmee Army Air Field and Dunnellon Army Air Field

- Hammer Field, California, 1 January – 31 March 1944

Also operated from: Meadows Field Airport, Bakersfield; Delano Army Air Field; Kern County Airport; Visalia Municipal Airport, and Salinas Army Air Base

== See also ==
- Operational - Replacement Training Units
