= 417th Test and Evaluation Squadron =

417th Test and Evaluation Squadron

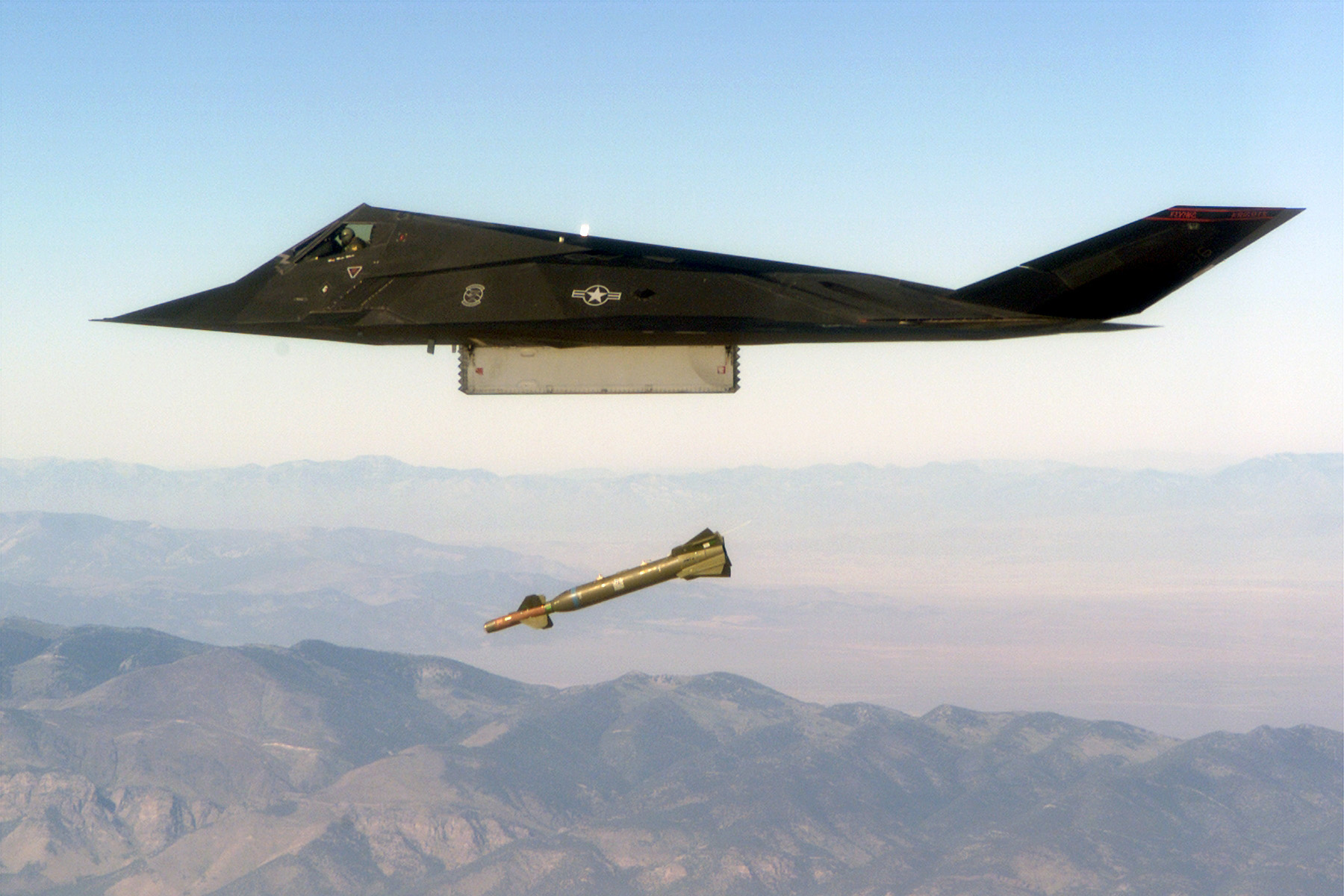
- An F-117 Nighthawk engages its target and drops a GBU-27 guided bomb
- Active: 1943–1946; 1953–1977; 1978–1987; 1989–1993; 2003–2006; 2018–present
- Country: United States
- Branch: United States Air Force
- Type: Squadron
- Role: Advanced Fighter Training
- Part of: Air Combat Command
- Nickname: Bandits (1989-1993)
- Engagements: World War II (EAME Theater) Vietnam War Gulf War

- Decorations: Distinguished Unit Citation Air Force Outstanding Unit Award with Combat "V" Device Air Force Outstanding Unit Award (2x) Republic of Vietnam Gallantry Cross with Palm

Commanders
- Notable commanders: Chuck Yeager

Insignia
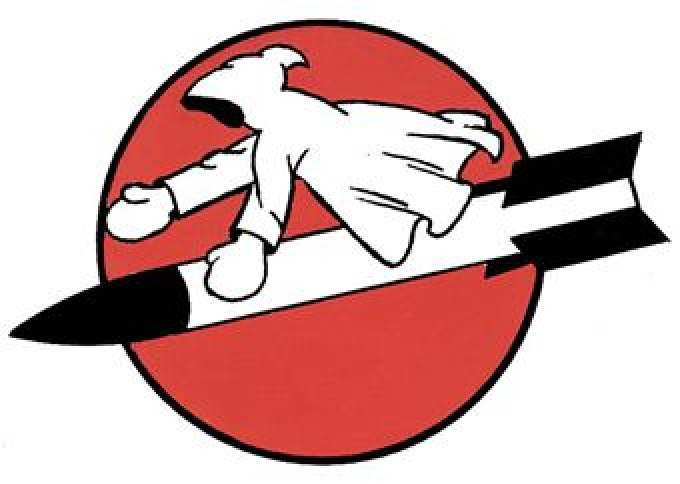
- 417th Test & Evaluation Squadron emblem (Note: Approved 16 November 1953. Maurer gives the year for approval as 1958. Maurer, Combat Squadrons, p. 512. It seems unlikely, however that the squadron would have waited five years to request an emblem. Restored.)

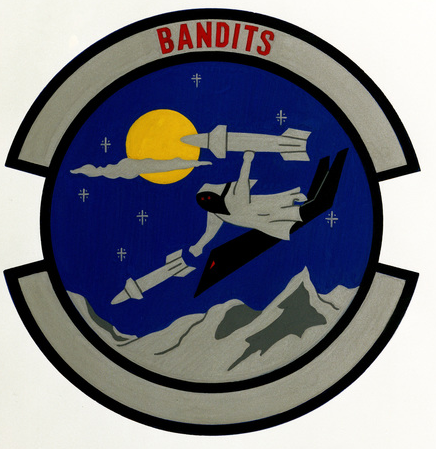
- 417th Tactical Fighter Training Squadron emblem

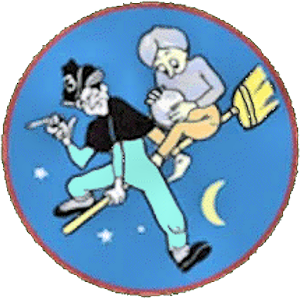
- 417th Night Fighter Squadron emblem

The 417th Test and Evaluation Squadron is an active United States Air Force unit, assigned to the 753rd Test and Evaluation Group and stationed at Edwards Air Force Base, California. Its previous assignment was with the USAF Weapons School at Holloman Air Force Base, New Mexico, where it was inactivated on 14 September 2006.

The squadron was originally activated as the 417th Night Fighter Squadron in February 1943. After training in the United States and receiving additional operational training in the United Kingdom, the squadron saw action in the Mediterranean Theater of Operations, flying both the British Bristol Beaufighter and Northrop P-61 Black Widow night fighters. It earned a Distinguished Unit Citation for operations in Southern France. Following V-E Day, the 417th served as part of the occupation forces in Germany until inactivating in November 1946, and transferring its personnel to another squadron, which was simultaneously activated.

The squadron was activated as the 417th Fighter-Bomber Squadron in January 1953, when it replaced an Air National Guard squadron that had been mobilized for the Korean War. It soon moved to Europe with its North American F-86 Sabres, which it flew until upgrading to North American F-100 Super Sabres in 1958. In 1966 the unit transitioned to the McDonnell F-4 Phantom II as the 417th Tactical Fighter Squadron and was engaged in combat during the Vietnam War, being part of two combat deployments. Although kept on the record as an active squadron until September 1987, all personnel were withdrawn from the unit in November 1978.

In 1989 as the 417th Tactical Fighter Training Squadron at the Tonopah Test Range in Nevada, it was responsible for the replacement training of new Lockheed F-117A Nighthawk stealth fighter pilots until inactivating in 1993.

== History ==
=== World War II ===
The squadron was established in February 1943 as the 417th Night Fighter Squadron and trained with the 481st Night Fighter Operational Training Group at Orlando Army Air Base, Florida. The 417th was the fourth USAAF dedicated night fighter squadron formed. The unit trained in the Douglas P-70, a modified Douglas A-20 Havoc bomber using a U.S. version of the British Mk IV radar. At the time the P-70 was the only American night fighter available. Besides routine transition training in the night fighter, the pilots also completed calibration, instrument, navigation flights, and numerous target missions in this period.

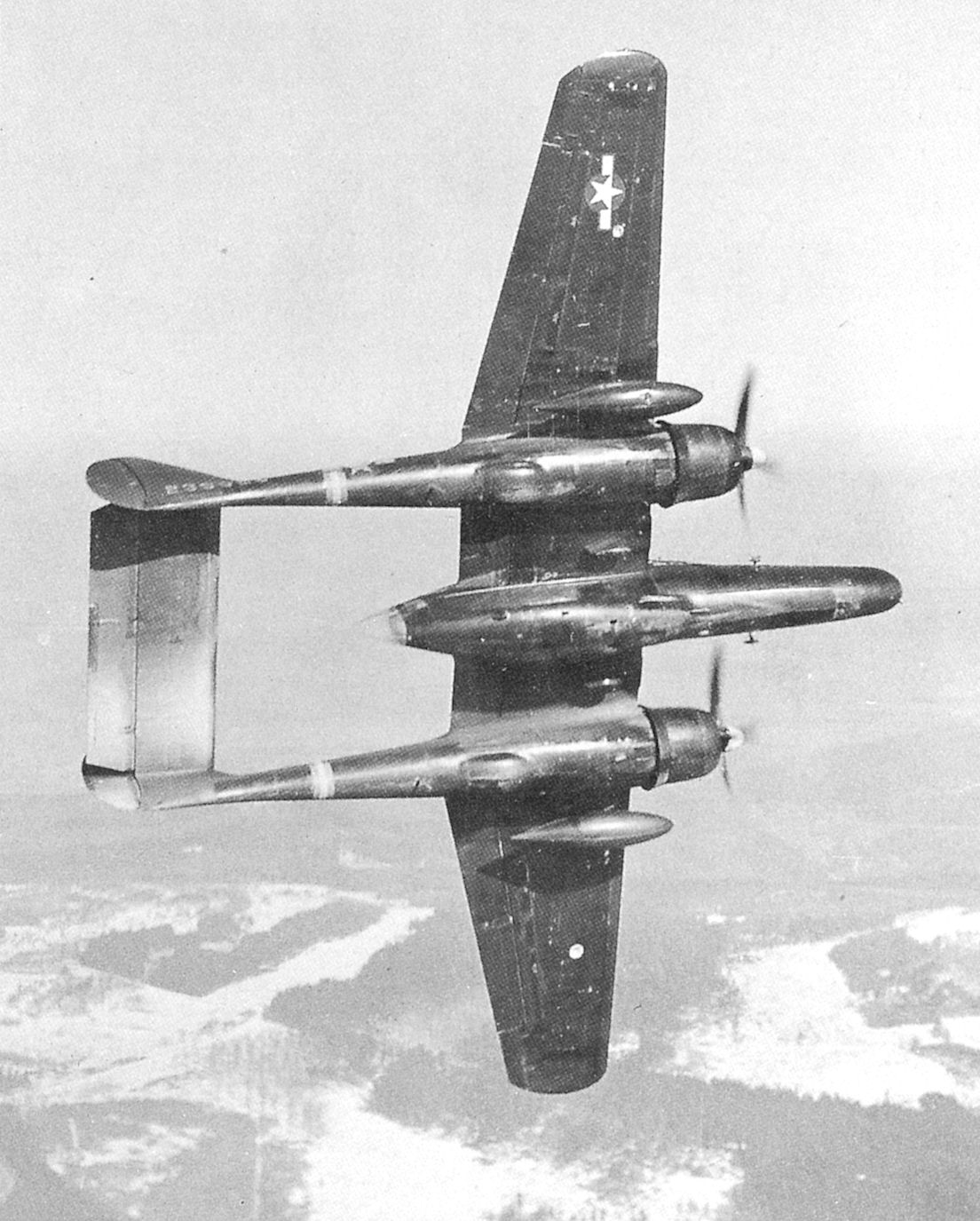
417th Night Fighter Squadron P-61 in flight over the Bavarian Alps.

The squadron moved to England and was reassigned to VIII Fighter Command in the European Theater of Operations in May 1943. Because the P-70 was not suitable for night combat in Europe, the squadron was equipped with Royal Air Force (RAF) Bristol Beaufighters that were becoming available as RAF units equipped with the De Havilland Mosquito through a "reverse Lend-Lease" program until an American aircraft could be produced. The squadron received additional training with RAF night fighter units at several bases in early 1943 achieving the first victory on 24 July. Through the summer, they conducted daytime convoy escort and strike missions, but thereafter flew primarily at night.

The squadron was reassigned to Twelfth Air Force and deployed to Algeria in August 1943. Most of the ex-RAF aircraft they had inherited were battle weary and no supplies of spares were available through the US supply chain. The squadron scrounged a North American B-25 Mitchell, which it named the "Strawberry Roan," and used it to range throughout the Mediterranean in search of Beaufighter parts. The 417th carried out defensive night patrols over Allied held territory during the North African campaign, also conducted night interdiction raids on German positions in Algeria and Tunisia. In April 1944, the 417th transferred to Corsica and resumed patrol activities. In August 1944, the unit supported the Allied invasion of southern France before taking up duty to fly patrol, intruder, and interceptor missions.

The 417th moved to Belgium, operating from bases in the Low Countries, and moving into northern Germany in early 1944. During March and April 1945, the 417th converted from the Beaufighter to the Northrop P-61 Black Widow aircraft. It last major combat operations in the first week of May consisted of nightly patrols and intruder missions against enemy aircraft attempting to harass Seventh Army troops and their bridgeheads across the Danube River at Ulm, Donauwörth, and Dillingen, Germany.

The squadron remained in Germany after the war as part of the United States Air Forces in Europe. It performed occupation duty for over a year, returning to the United States and inactivating in November 1946.

=== Cold War ===
In November 1952, the Air Force redesignated the unit as the 417th Fighter-Bomber Squadron and activated it on 1 January 1953 at Clovis Air Force Base, New Mexico, for training in North American F-51D Mustang aircraft. Soon thereafter, the squadron converted to the North American F-86F Sabre jet, but the transition period extended over a long period due to an acute shortage of trained people. In the Summer, the 417th moved to Hahn Air Base, West Germany, to become a unit in the United States Air Forces in Europe. The aircraft were deployed to Hahn during Operation Fox Able 20. This marked the first mass flight of an entire tactical wing from the U.S. to continental Europe. At Hahn, the squadron trained in air-to-ground and air-to-air gunnery at places like Fürstenfeldbruck Air Base and Giebelstadt Air Base in West Germany and Wheelus Air Base, Libya.

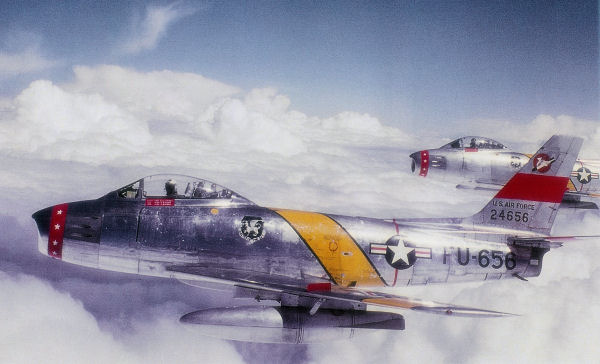
417th Squadron F-86Fs over Germany (Note: Aircraft are North American F-86F-30-NA Sabres. Serial 52-4656 is in front.)

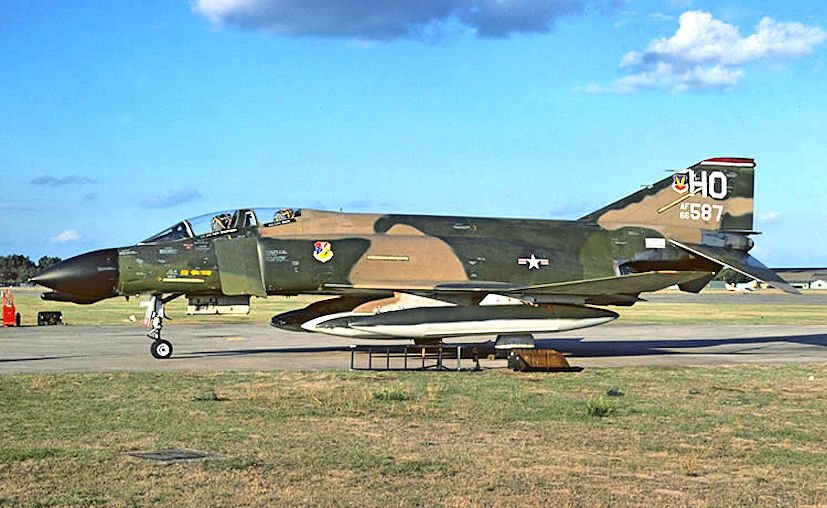
417th TFS F-4D 66-7587

During early 1958, the 417th turned in its F-86 Sabrejets, and then deployed to Wheelus, where it received North American F-100 Super Sabre aircraft. The unit remained in Libya for nearly 60 days where its completed transition training in the new aircraft. At Hahn, the unit's mission was the delivery of tactical nuclear weapons against Warsaw Pact forces in the event of an invasion of Western Europe. Its secondary missions were tactical air defense and support for North Atlantic Treaty Organization (NATO) ground forces. Due to the vulnerability of West Germany to Soviet attack, Air Force planners did not want their tactical nuclear weapons in locations that could be quickly overrun by Warsaw Pact forces. When construction was completed at Toul-Rosières Air Base France, the squadron was moved there in July 1956.

On 8 July 1958, the Air Force redesignated the squadron as the 417th Tactical Fighter Squadron. Disagreements arose concerning atomic storage and custody issues within NATO, resulting in a decision to remove United States Air Force atomic-capable units from French soil. The squadron was moved back to Hahn Air Base in December 1959. It remained in West Germany as a tactical fighter squadron, equipped with the F-100 Super Sabre, until 1966, upgrading to the McDonnell F-4D Phantom II until its inactivation on 30 April 1967.

The 417th returned from Europe for reassignment at Mountain Home Air Force Base, Idaho, on 15 July 68 with the 67th Tactical Reconnaissance Wing. From there, it deployed for training at Hahn 15 January to 3 April 1969 and 11 September to 9 October 1970.

The return from West Germany, however, brought with it a move to Holloman Air Force Base, New Mexico, where the 417th remained until 30 April 1977. This time included several deployments: Takhli Royal Thai Air Force Base, Thailand from 10 May to 30 September 1972; Hahn AB, West Germany, from 3 February to 14 March 1973, 6 March to 5 April 1974, 3 October to 5 November 1975, and 24 August to 26 September 1976; and Nellis Air Force Base, Nevada, 29 November to 19 December 1975. The tours in Thailand led to two honors for Vietnam War service.

The 417th resumed service when it activated on 1 October 1978 at Zweibrücken Air Base, West Germany, as part of the 26th Tactical Reconnaissance Wing. At that time, however, the squadron only received a few people and one F-4D Phantom II aircraft. The unit moved to Ramstein Air Base, West Germany on 1 November 1978, but evidently lost its personnel and aircraft to become a paper organization. Moreover, the 417th also transferred from the 26th Tactical Reconnaissance Wing to the 86th Tactical Fighter Wing on 15 November 1981, remaining a paper organization until it inactivated on 15 September 1987.

=== F-117 Development/Operations ===
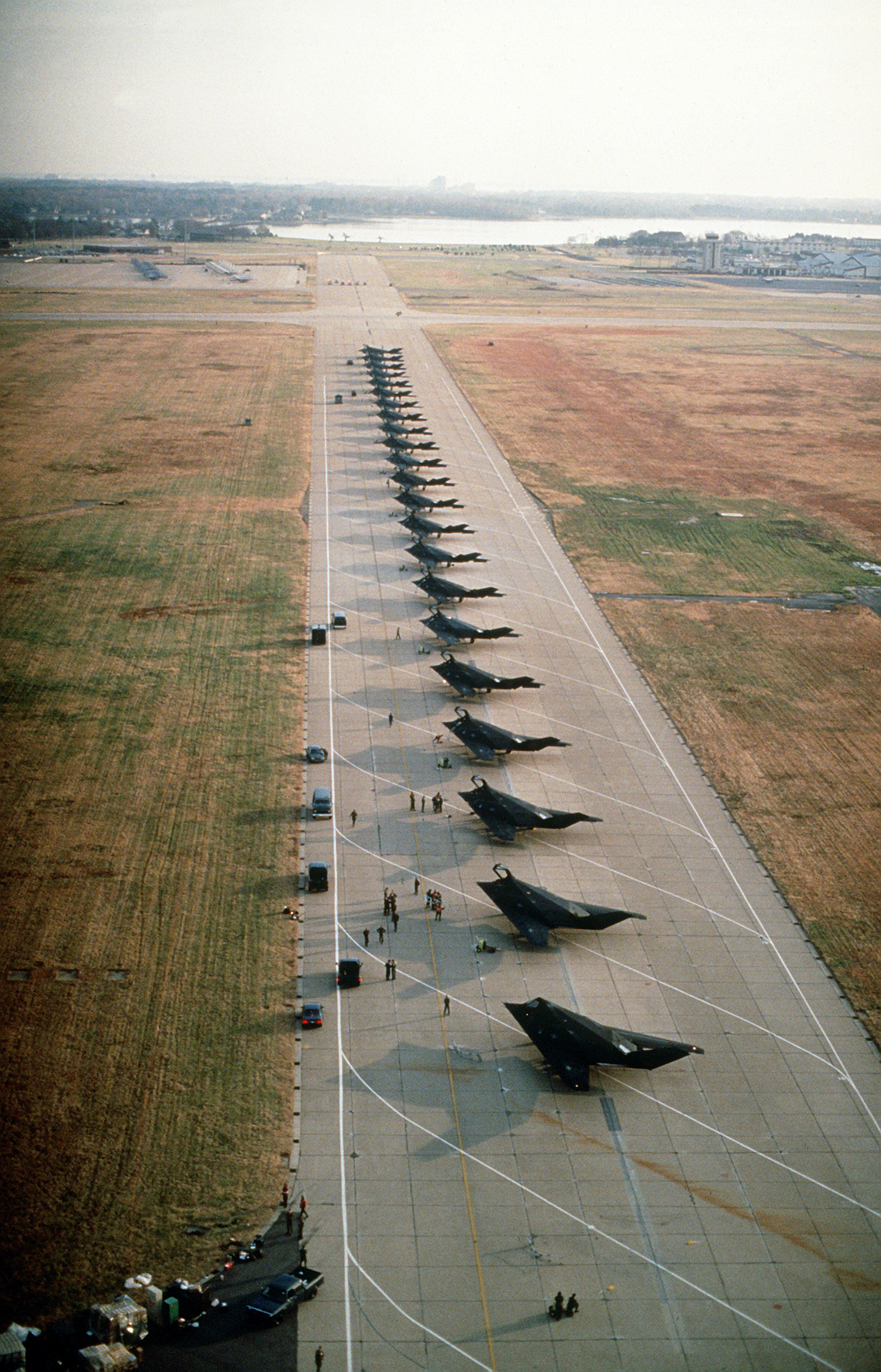
F-117A aircraft from the 37th Tactical Fighter Wing at Langley AFB, Virginia, prior to being deployed to Saudi Arabia for Operation Desert Shield

The I-Unit was activated by Tactical Air Command at Tonopah Test Range Airport, Nevada as a classified unit on 1 October 1985. It began receiving full-scale development Lockheed F-117A Nighthawk stealth fighters from Lockheed for testing. It was replaced by the 4453d Test and Evaluation Squadron on 30 May 1989 as part of the 4450th Tactical Group, performing training missions with the F-117A in a clandestine environment. All Tonopah training flights were conducted under the cover of darkness until late 1988. On 10 November 1988, the Air Force brought the F-117A from behind a "black veil" by publicly acknowledging its existence, but provided few details about it. The official confirmation of the F-117A's existence, however, had little impact on Tonopah operations. Pilots began occasionally flying the F-117A during the day, but personnel were still ferried to and from work each Monday and Friday from Nellis. Everyone associated with the project was still forbidden to talk about what they did for a living, and the program remained shrouded in secrecy.

The 4453d was inactivated on 25 September 1989 and its personnel and equipment transferred to the 417th Tactical Fighter Training Squadron on 5 October 1989 when the 4450th was inactivated and replaced by the 37th Tactical Fighter Wing. It became responsible for the replacement training of new F-117A stealth fighter pilots. In the realignment of F-117A squadrons, the 415th and 416th were assigned production F-117As; the 417th was assigned pre-production F-117As, along with Northrop T-38 Talon trainers for pilot transition training to the F-117.

In January 1991, the F-117As of the 417th were deployed to King Khalid Air Base, Saudi Arabia, where they saw combat during Operation Desert Storm. After combat ended, the squadron returned home to Tonopah in early April 1991. After Desert Storm, the 417th was assigned to the 37th Operations Group and redesignated the 417th Fighter Squadron as part of the wing's adoption of the Air Force Objective Wing organization.

In 1992, as part of the post Cold War budget cutbacks in the Air Force, the F-117As were moved to Holloman Air Force Base, New Mexico. The 37th Fighter Wing and its subordinate organizations were inactivated and the aircraft, equipment, personnel and mission of the squadron were assigned to the 49th Operations Group. In 1993, squadron transferred its F-117s to the 7th Fighter Squadron and inactivated.

=== USAF Weapons School ===
The Air Force Chief of Staff directed the creation of the F-117 Division, USAF Weapons School in May 2002 at Holloman. The initial cadre class began in January 2003, and the validation class began their training in July 2003. On 13 August 2003, the F-117 Division was replaced by the 417th Weapons Squadron. The 417th was a geographically separated unit of the 57th Wing.

The squadron provided advanced training to F-117A instructor pilots. The course included 26 syllabus sorties, seven simulator missions, four mission planning exercises and more than 400 hours of academics. It was inactivated along with F-117A in September 2006.

=== Test and Evaluation ===
On 24 April 2018, the 417th was reactivated as the 417th Test and Evaluation Squadron at Edwards Air Force Base, California.

== Lineage ==
- Constituted as the 417th Night Fighter Squadron on 17 February 1943

Activated on 20 February 1943
Inactivated on 9 November 1946

- Redesignated 417th Fighter-Bomber Squadron on 15 November 1952

Activated on 1 January 1953
Redesignated 417th Tactical Fighter Squadron on 8 July 1958
Inactivated on 30 April 1977

- Activated on 1 October 1978

Inactivated on 15 September 1987
Redesignated 417th Tactical Fighter Training Squadron on 15 September 1989
Activated on 5 October 1989
Redesignated 417th Fighter Squadron on 1 November 1991
Inactivated on 1 December 1993

- Redesignated 417th Weapons Squadron on 11 August 2003

Activated on 13 August 2003
Inactivated c. 14 September 2006

- Redesignated 417th Test and Evaluation Squadron on 24 April 2018

Activated on 24 April 2018

=== Assignments ===
- Air Defense Department, Army Air Forces School of Applied Tactics, 20 February 1943
- VIII Fighter Command (attached to the Royal Air Force), 11 May 1943
- Twelfth Air Force, 8 August 1943 (attached to 2689 Air Defense Region (Provisional), Northwest African Coastal Air Force, 9 August 1943, No. 337 Wing, RAF, 3 January 1944)
- 63d Fighter Wing, 27 April 1944
- XII Fighter Command, 27 September 1944
- Twelfth Air Force, 1 October 1944 (attached to Mediterranean Allied Coastal Air Force after 3 October 1944)

Air echelon further attached to 422d Night Fighter Squadron, 6–22 January 1945

- 64th Fighter Wing (attached to First Tactical Air Force [Provisional]), 24 March 1945
- XII Tactical Air Command, 17 May 1945
- 64th Fighter Wing, 26 June 1945 – 9 November 1946 (attached to All Weather Group (Provisional), 64th Fighter Wing, 15 August – 9 November 1946)
- 50th Fighter-Bomber Group, 1 January 1953
- 50th Fighter-Bomber Wing (later 50th Tactical Fighter Wing), 8 December 1957
- Tactical Air Command, 1 March 1968
- 67th Tactical Reconnaissance Wing, 1 July 1968 (attached to 50th Tactical Fighter Wing, 15 January – 3 April 1969, 11 September – 9 October 1970)
- 49th Tactical Fighter Wing, 15 November 1970 – 30 April 1977
- 26th Tactical Reconnaissance Wing, 1 October 1978
- 86th Tactical Fighter Wing, 15 November 1981 – 15 September 1987
- 37th Tactical Fighter Wing, 5 October 1989
- 37th Operations Group, 1 November 1991
- 49th Operations Group, 8 July 1992 – 1 December 1993
- USAF Weapons School, 13 August 2003 – 14 September 2006
- 53d Test and Evaluation Group, 24 April 2018 – present

=== Stations ===
- Orlando Army Air Base, Florida, 20 February 1943
- Kissimmee Army Air Field, Florida, 5 March – 26 April 1943
- RAF Ayr (AAF-570), Scotland, 12 May 1943
- RAF Cranfield (AAF-525), England, 14 May 1943

Detachment at RAF Ayr (AAF-570, Scotland, 14 May – 10 June 1943
Detachment at RAF Uxbridge (AAF-409), England, 14 May – 10 June 1943
Detachment at RAF Coltishall (AAF-355), England, 14 May – 10 June 1943
Detachment at RAF Bristol (AAF-473), England, 14 May – 10 June 1943
Detachment at RAF Scorton (AAF-425), England, 23 May – 10 June 1943

- RAF Scorton (AAF-425), England, 10 June 1943
- Tafaraoui Airfield, Algeria, 8 August 1943

Ground echelon at Ghisonaccia Airfield, Corsica, France, 7 January – February 1944

- La Senia Airfield, Oran, Algeria 10 January 1944

Ground echelon at Borgo Airfield, Corsica, France, February–April 1944

- Borgo Airfield, Corsica, France, c. 25 April – 7 September 1944
- La Vallon Airfield (Y-18), France, 12 September 1944

Air echelon at Florennes Airfield (A-78), Belgium, 6–22 January 1945

- St-Dizier Airfield (A-64), France, 5 April 1945
- Giebelstadt Airfield (Y-90), Germany, 24 April 1945
- Biblis Airfield (Y-78), Germany, 21 May 1945
- AAF Station Braunshard (Y-72), Germany, 26 June 1945
- AAF Station Kassel/Rothwesten (R-12), Germany, 9 August 1945
- AAF Station Fritzlar (Y-86), Germany, 10 April 1946
- AAF Station Schweinfurt, Germany (R-25), 20 August – 9 November 1946
- Clovis Air Force Base, New Mexico, 1 January 1953
- Hahn Air Base, West Germany, 9 August 1953
- Toul-Rosières Air Base, France, 15 April 1956
- Ramstein Air Base, West Germany, 1 December 1959 – 15 July 1968
- Mountain Home Air Force Base, Idaho, 15 July 1968

Deployed at Hahn Air Base, West Germany, 15 January – 3 April 1969 and 11 September – 9 October 1970

- Holloman Air Force Base, New Mexico, 9 October 1970 – 30 April 1977

Deployed at Takhli Royal Thai Air Force Base, Thailand, 10 May – 30 September 1972
Deployed at Hahn Air Base, West Germany, 3 February – 14 March 1973, 6 March – 5 April 1974, 3 October – 5 November 1975, and 24 August – 26 September 1976
Deployed at Nellis Air Force Base, Nevada, 29 November – 19 December 1975

- Zweibrücken Air Base, West Germany, 1 October 1978
- Ramstein Air Base, West Germany, 1 November 1978 – 15 September 1987
- Tonopah Test Range Airport, Nevada, 5 October 1989
- Holloman Air Force Base, New Mexico, July 1992 – 1 December 1993, 13 August 2003 – 14 September 2006ref name="Peebles"/>
- Edwards Air Force Base, California, 24 April 2018 – present

=== Aircraft ===
- Douglas P-70 Havoc, 1943
- Bristol Beaufighter, 1943–1945
- Northrop P-61 Black Widow, 1945–1946
- North American F-51 Mustang, 1953
- North American F-86 Sabre, 1953–1958
- North American F-100 Super Sabre, 1958–1966
- McDonnell F-4 Phantom II, 1967–1978
- Lockheed F-117 Nighthawk, 1985–1993
- Northrop T-38 Talon, 1989–1992
- Lockheed F-117 Nighthawk, 2003–2006

== See also ==
- 481st Night Fighter Operational Training Group
