= 348th Night Fighter Squadron =

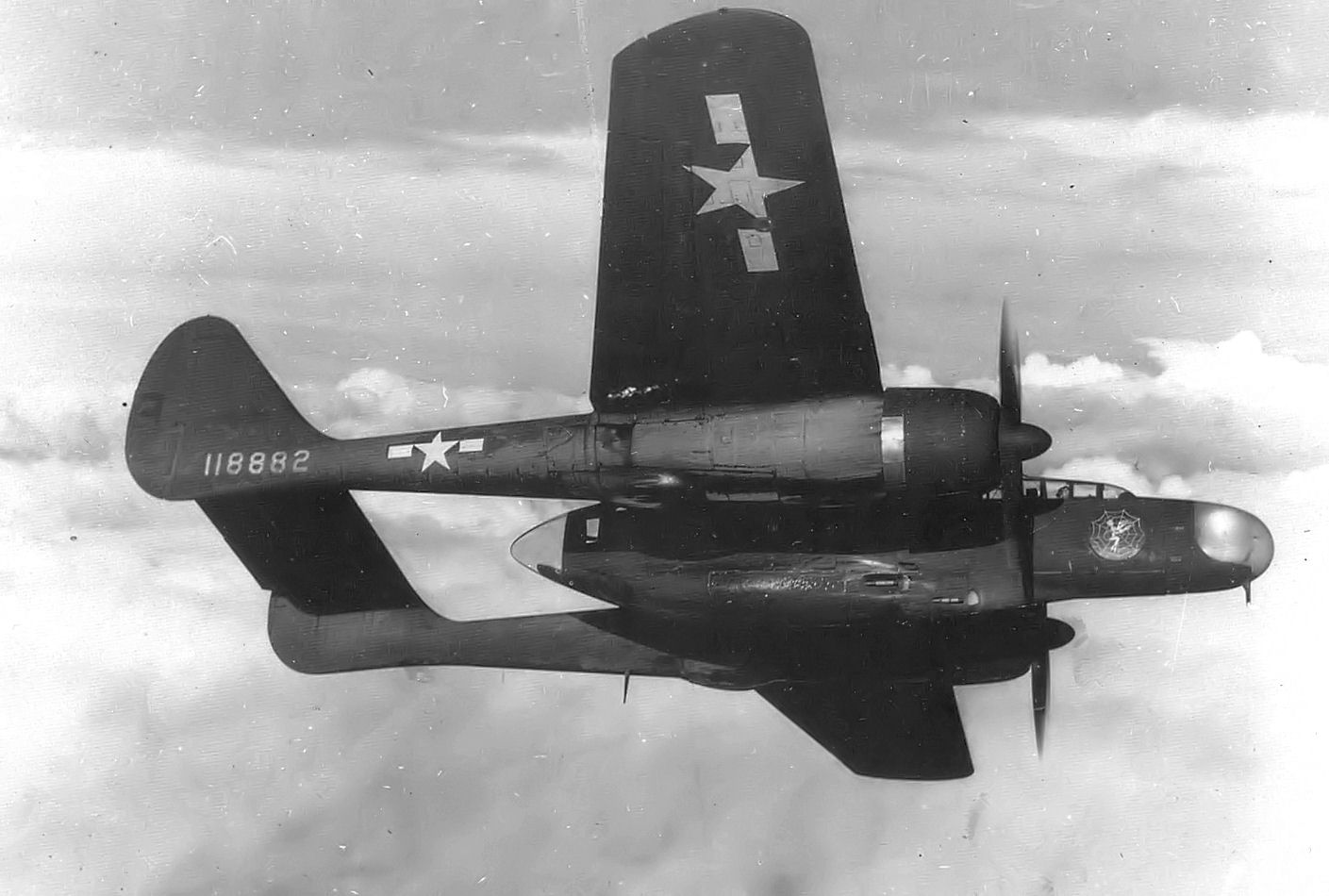
- 348th Night Fighter Squadron YP-61 Black Widow (Note: Aircraft is Northrop YP-61-NO Black Widow, serial 41-18882.)
- Active: 1942–1944
- Country: United States
- Branch: United States Air Force
- Role: Night fighter operational training
- Engagements: World War II American Theater

Insignia
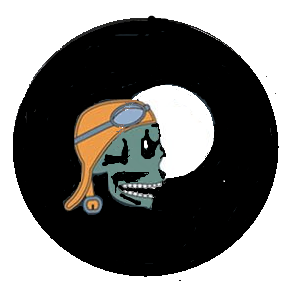
- 348th Night Fighter Squadron emblem (Note: Approved 16 April 1943. Description: On a black disc, a death's head green, trimmed black, wearing a golden-orange aviator's helmet, gray goggles, in front of a small white disc.)

The 348th Night Fighter Squadron is an inactive United States Air Force unit. Its last assignment was with the 481st Night Fighter Operational Training Group at Salinas Army Air Base, California. The unit was disbanded on 31 March 1944.

The squadron was the first dedicated night fighter operational training squadron of the Air Force. The squadron trained newly activated night fighter squadrons who were deployed overseas into combat until its inactivation in March 1944 due to a reorganization of Army Air Forces training units.

== History ==
The squadron was formed in October 1942 from elements of the 81st Fighter Squadron as part of the Army Air Forces School of Applied Tactics (AAFSAT) Fighter Command School at Orlando Army Air Base, Florida. Its personnel being veteran American pilots trained by the Royal Air Force in night interception operations. It was initially equipped with three Douglas DB-7s and twenty-three Douglas P-70 Havocs. Shortages in operational flying aircraft, spare parts and other issues kept flying training very rudimentary for the squadrons first classes that graduated in December 1942.

As 1943 progressed additional aircraft and equipment arrived and the program expanded. In September, the first American-built dedicated night fighter began to arrive, the Northrop YP-61 Black Widow and a few production P-61As. In January 1944 the night fighter training program moved to Hammer Field, California and was placed under IV Fighter Command. The move placed the squadron near Northrop manufacturing facility at Hawthorne, California and most programmed P-61 squadrons were planned for operations in the Pacific and China Burma India Theaters.

In March 1944 the 348th was disbanded when the Army Air Forces found that standard military units, based on relatively inflexible tables of organization were proving less well adapted to the training mission. Accordingly, a more functional system was adopted in which each base was organized into a separate numbered unit during a reorganization of units in the United States. The squadron's personnel and equipment were transferred to Squadron A of the 450th Army Air Forces Base Unit (Night Fighter Replacement Training Unit).

== Lineage ==
- Constituted 348th Night Fighter Squadron on 1 October 1942

Activated on 1 October 1942
Disbanded on 31 March 1944

=== Assignments ===
- Fighter Command School, Army Air Forces School of Applied Tactics, 21 January 1943
- Air Defense Department, Army Air Forces School of Applied Tactics, 18 February 1943
- Night Fighter Division, Army Air Forces School of Applied Tactics, 1 April 1943 (attached to 481st Night Fighter Operational Training Group after 17 July 1943)
- 481st Night Fighter Operational Training Group, 26 July 1943 – 31 March 1944

=== Stations ===
- Orlando Army Air Base, Florida, 4 October 1942
- Salinas Army Air Base, California, 19 January – 31 March 1944

=== Aircraft Assigned ===
- Douglas A-20 Havoc, 1942–1944
- Douglas P-70 Havoc, 1942–1944
- Douglas DB-7 Boston, 1942–1944
- Douglas B-18 Bolo, 1943–1944
- Cessna C-78 Bobcat, 1943–1944
- Beechcraft AT-11 Kansan, 1943–1944
- Vultee BT-13 Valiant, 1943–1944
- Lockheed B-34 Ventura, 1943–1944
- Northrop YP-61 Black Widow, 1943–1944

== See also ==
- Operational - Replacement Training Units
