= 349th Night Fighter Squadron =

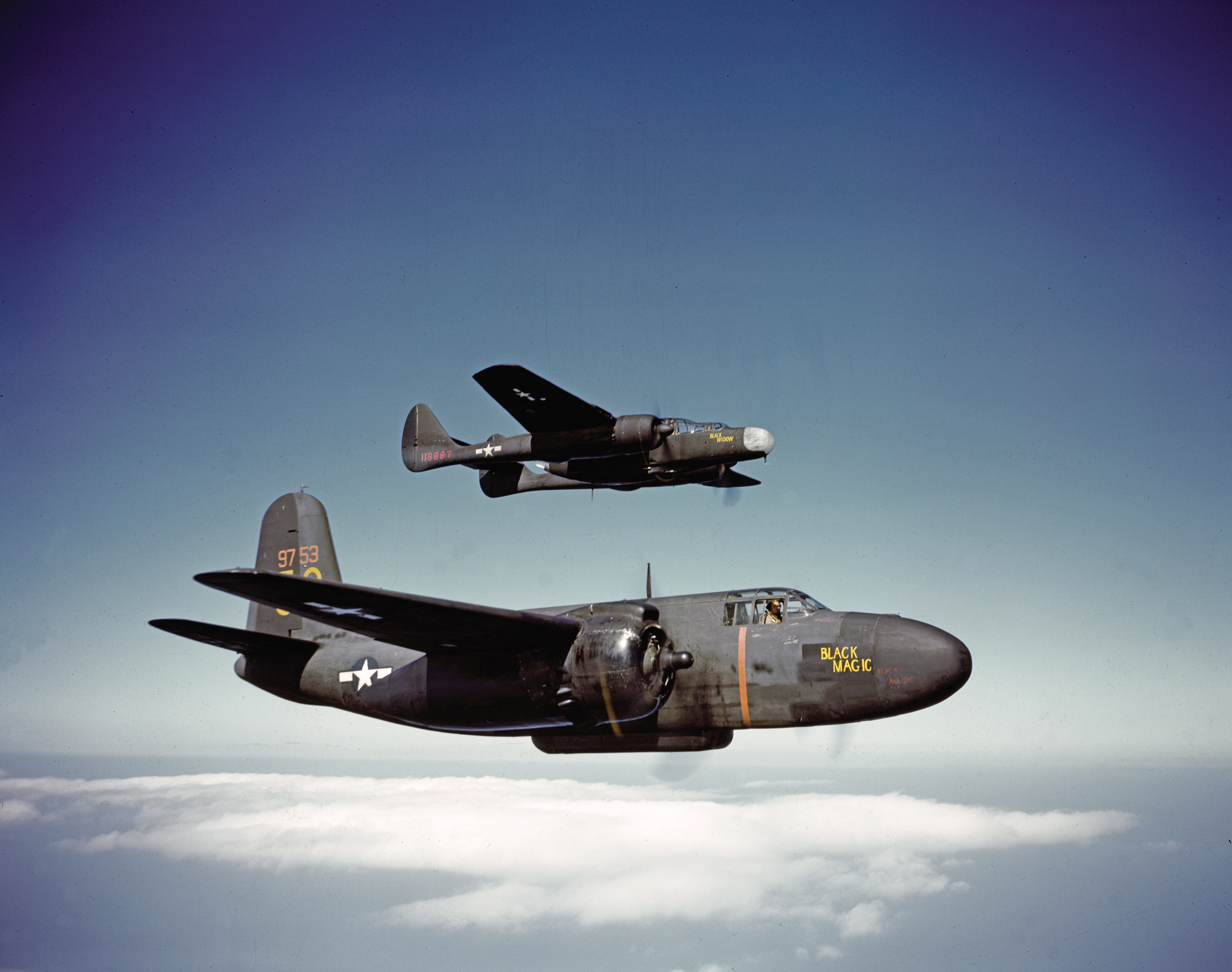
- The first YP-61 Black Widow night fighter to arrive at Orlando Army Air Base, November 1943 is met by a Squadron P-70 Havoc "Black Magic".
- Active: 1942–1944
- Country: United States
- Branch: United States Air Force
- Type: Operational Training Unit
- Role: Night fighter training
- Engagements: World War II American Campaign

Insignia
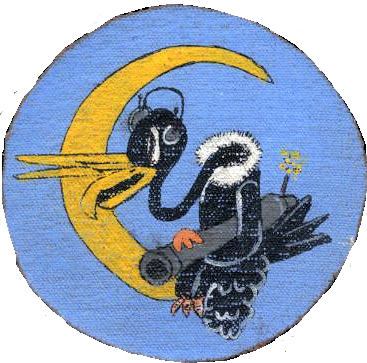
- 349th Night Fighter Squadron emblem (Note: Approved 18 January 1944. Description: on a grayed light blue disc, thin border black, a caricatured black vulture, neck feathers white, feet, neck and head light red, beak yellow orange, perched on the horn of a light yellow decrescent moon, wearing gray head phones, and holding a gray cannon lighted at the fuse proper, in the crotch of the left wing; two yellow orange lightning flashes emanating from the eyes.)

The 349th Night Fighter Squadron (349th NFS) is an inactive United States Air Force unit which specialized in training airmen to utilize night fighters as nighttime interceptors. Its last assignment was with the 481st Night Fighter Operational Training Group, based at Hammer Field, California. First activated in October 1942, the unit was disbanded on 31 March 1944.

The squadron was one of the first dedicated night fighter operational training squadrons of the Army Air Forces. The squadron trained newly activated night fighter squadrons who were deployed overseas into combat until its inactivation in March 1944 due to a realignment of training units.

== History ==
The squadron was formed in October 1942 from elements of the 81st Fighter Squadron as part of the Army Air Force School of Applied Tactics (AAFSAT) Fighter Command School at Orlando Army Air Base, Florida. Its personnel being veteran American pilots trained by the Royal Air Force in night interception operations. It was initially equipped with three Douglas DB-7s and twenty-three Douglas P-70s. Shortages in operational flying aircraft, spare parts and other issues kept flying training very rudimentary for the squadrons first classes that graduated in December 1942.

As 1943 progressed additional aircraft and equipment arrived and the program expanded. In September, the first American-built dedicated night fighters began to arrive, the Northrup YP-61 Black Widow and a few production P-61As. In January 1944 the entire program moved to Hammer Field, California and was placed under IV Fighter Command. The move placed the squadron near the Northrop Aircraft manufacturing facility at Hawthorne, California and most programmed P-61 squadrons were planned for operations in the Pacific and China Burma India Theaters.

In March 1944 the 349th was disbanded when the Army Air Forces found that standard military units, based on relatively inflexible tables of organization were proving less well adapted to the training mission. Accordingly, a more functional system was adopted in which each base was organized into a separate numbered unit during a reorganization of units in the United States. The squadron's personnel and equipment were transferred to Squadron B of the 450th Army Air Forces Base Unit (Night Fighter Replacement Training Unit).

=== Lineage ===
- Constituted as the 349th Night Fighter Squadron on 1 October 1942

Activated on 1 October 1942
Disbanded on 31 March 1944

=== Assignments ===
- Fighter Command School, Army Air Force School of Applied Tactics (AAFSAT), 21 January 1943
- Air Defense Department, AAFSAT, 18 February 1943
- Night Fighter Division, AAFSAT, 1 April 1943

Attached to 481st Night Fighter Operational Training Group, 17 July 1943

- 481st Night Fighter Operational Training Group, 26 July 1943 – 31 March 1944

=== Stations ===
- Orlando Army Air Base, Florida, 4 October 1942
- Kissimmee Army Airfield, Florida, 1 January 1943
- Hammer Field, California, 16 January – 31 March 1944

=== Aircraft Assigned ===
- A-20/DB-7/P-70 Havoc, 1942–1944
- Douglas B-18 Bolo, 1943–1944
- YP-61 Black Widow, 1943–1944

== See also ==
- Operational - Replacement Training Units
