= Kissimmee Army Airfield =

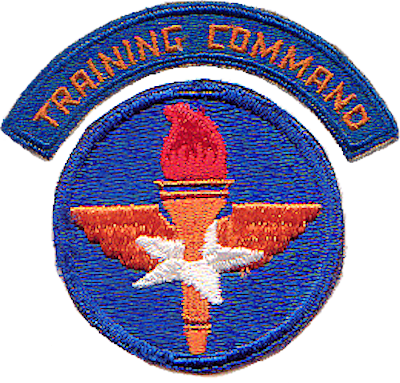
Kissimmee Army Airfield
- Part of Army Air Force Training Command
- Located near: Kissimmee, Florida
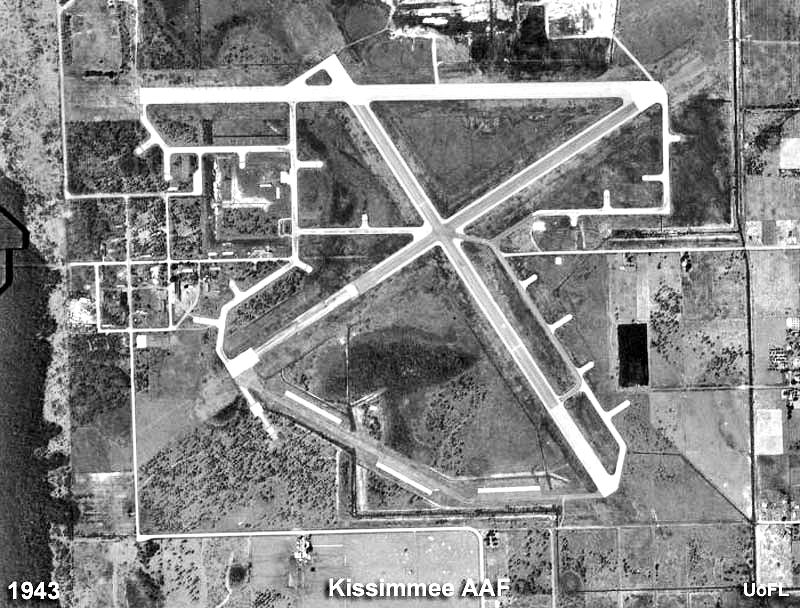
- Kissimmee Army Airfield – 1943

Location
- Coordinates: 28°17′23″N 081°26′14″W

Site history
- In use: 1940–1945

Kissimmee Army Airfield, was a United States Army Air Forces airfield during World War II, located 1.8 miles (2.9 km) west of Kissimmee, Florida.

== History ==
The airport opened in April 1940 as the Kissimmee Municipal Airport. By 1941, it was taken over by the United States Army Air Forces (USAAF) as part of the expansion of defense forces in the United States prior to World War II. Known as Kissimmee Army Airfield, it was a sub-base of the Orlando Army Air Base.

Operationally, once enough construction was completed, the first operational mission assigned to the new base was to conduct reconnaissance over the Atlantic coast and Gulf of Mexico, looking for Nazi U-boats. The 26th Anti-Submarine Wing, based in Miami, deployed elements of the 9th Antisubmarine Squadron to the field. O-47 light observation aircraft, along with B-25 Mitchell and B-34 Lexington medium bombers equipped with antisubmarine radar were used to fly anti-sub patrols over the Atlantic coast and the eastern Gulf of Mexico. The antisubmarine mission was taken over by the U.S. Navy in mid-1943 operating from various naval air stations in Florida and the USAAF aircraft were withdrawn.

Beginning in late 1942, the major mission of Orlando AAB became a training center for pilots and fighter and bomber groups of the Air University's Army Air Forces School of Applied Tactics (AAFSAT) tactical combat simulation school in Central and Northern Florida. Headquartered at Orlando AAB, the school's mission was to develop tactics and techniques of aerial warfare and to establish technical and tactical proficiency requirements for combat units to effectively engage and defeat enemy air forces. This was done with a wide variety of aircraft, including heavy strategic bombers; tactical fighters; medium and light bombers; reconnaissance aircraft and dive bombers, based at different airfields of the school.

As part of the school, the 99th Bombardment Squadron flew North American B-25 Mitchells and MartinB-26 Marauder medium bombers from the airfield.

Beginning in January 1943, the mission of the airfield was changed to Night Fighter pilot training, the station coming under the jurisdiction of the AAFSAT Night Fighter Department (Dark). On 26 January 1943, the first American Night Fighter Squadron, the 414th was organized at Kissimmee AAF and equipped with Douglas P-70 Havocs, modified Douglas A-20 Havocs painted black and modified for night flying.

During 1943, newly formed night fighter squadrons at Orlando AAB were transferred to Kissimmee AAF, where the received instruction in the P-70. The operational training unit was the 349th Night Fighter Squadron, which was reassigned to the airfield from Orlando AAB.

In September 1943, the P-70s were replaced by the purpose-built Northrop P-61 Black Widow night fighter and the 420th NFS was moved to Dunnellon Army Air Base in August 1943. The squadron was only at Dunnellon AAF a brief time, being reassigned to IV Fighter Command at Hammer Field, California on 18 January 1944. The movement of Night Fighter training to California was caused by the Black Widows being built in Southern California and the squadrons being equipped with the aircraft were programmed for the Pacific Theater.

With the night fighter training mission being moved to southern California in January 1944, the military use of the field was phased down. On 6 September 1944, the 904th Army Air Forces Base Unit (Fighter), was assigned to Kissimmee AAF with a mission of testing tactics, techniques and equipment. Numerous aircraft types were sent to the field, including P-39 Airacobras, P-38 Lightnings, P-47 Thunderbolts and the occasional P-51 Mustang.

=== Closure ===
With the end of the European War in May 1945, the pace of flying slowed down and in June 1945, orders were received from Orlando AAB that Kissimmee AAF would be closed. The airfield was closed on 7 July 1945 and jurisdiction of the airfield was transferred to Air Technical Service Command (ATSC), whose mission was the transfer of any useful military equipment to other bases around the country. Under ATSC, buildings and equipment were sold to civilian government or commercial entities and any useful military equipment transferred to other USAAF installations around the country. The base was declared as surplus and was turned over to the War Assets Administration (WAA) for disposal and return to civil use by the end of the year.

=== Major units assigned ===
- 99th Bombardment Squadron, 14 November 1942 – 5 January 1943.
- 414th Night Fighter Squadron, 26 January-21 April 1943 (P-70/A-20 Havoc)
- 415th Night Fighter Squadron, 8 February-21 April 1943 (P-70/A-20 Havoc)

These two squadrons received only about two months of training in Florida before being assigned to Twelfth Air Force in North Africa, where they were equipped with British Bristol Beaufighters for operations.

- 418th Night Fighter Squadron, 5 March-26 April 1943 (P-70/A-20 Havoc)
- 419th Night Fighter Squadron, 22 April-15 October 1943 (P-70/A-20 Havoc)

Moved to England in late May 1943 to complete training under the Royal Air Force, where they were equipped with British Bristol Beaufighters for operations.

- 420th Night Fighter Squadron, 1 June-20 August 1943 (P-70/A-20 Havoc)

Formed at Orlando AAF in June 1943, moved to Kissimmee as an Operational Training Unit (OTU). Part of the 481st Night Fighter Operational Training Group (NFOTG), under the Army Air Forces Tactical Center (AAFSAT), headquartered at Orlando B.

- 349th Night Fighter Squadron, 1 January 1943 – 15 January 1944 (DB-7/P-70 (A-20) Havoc), (B-25 Mitchell)
- 422d Night Fighter Squadron was the last squadron to be trained at Kissimmee AAF, 3 November 1943 – 6 January 1944 (P-70/A-20 Havoc) It then was moved back to Orlando for final training before being deployed to England

== See also ==
- Florida World War II Army Airfields
- Army Air Force School of Applied Tactics
