= Dunnellon/Marion County Airport =

Airport in Florida, U.S.

Marion County Airport (FAA LID: X35) is a county-owned public airport located in the unincorporated area of Dunnellon, in Marion County, Florida, United States. In 2014, the general aviation airport averaged 105 flights per day. The complex features two lighted runways with no control tower. During World War II, the airport was used by the United States Army Air Forces for training and was then known as the Dunnellon Army Air Field.

== Overview ==
The Marion County Airport is also known as the Dunnellon Army Airfield. It is owned by the Dunnellon Airport Authority and has recently been moved under the Park and Recreation department under the Marion County BCC at the direction of Mounir Bouyones, the County Administrator. Jim Couillard is the Airport Director and Mike Grawe is the Airport Manager.

The airport is located in unincorporated Marion County, Florida. From Interstate 75, it is situated 13 miles (21 km) west of the highway.

The airport and commerce complex encompasses 792 acres (3.21 km^{2}) of land. With new security fencing, electrical gates, a snack bar and additional T-hangars, the airport was not projected to require major expansion through 2020. The facility is located 38 miles (61 km) south of Gainesville Regional Airport. Services available include 24-hour aviation fuel, minor airframe and minor power plant servicing.

== Facilities and aircraft ==
Marion County Airport covers an area of 792 acres (321 ha) at an elevation of 65 feet (20 m) above mean sea level. It has two asphalt paved runways: 5/23 is 5,000 by 100 feet (1,524 by 30 m) and 10/28 is 4,702 by 60 feet (1,433 by 18 m).

For the 12-month period ending September 25, 2014, the airport had 38,603 general aviation aircraft operations, an average of 105 per day. At that time there were 107 aircraft based at this airport: 96 single-engine, 4 multi-engine, 1 jet, 1 helicopter and 5 ultralight.

The Marion County Airport hosts several businesses including Central Florida Skydiving, Red Sky Aviation, National Parachute Test Center, DAB Construction, Pratt Aviation, Fowler Aviation, ITEC and the X35 Aero Club.

== History ==
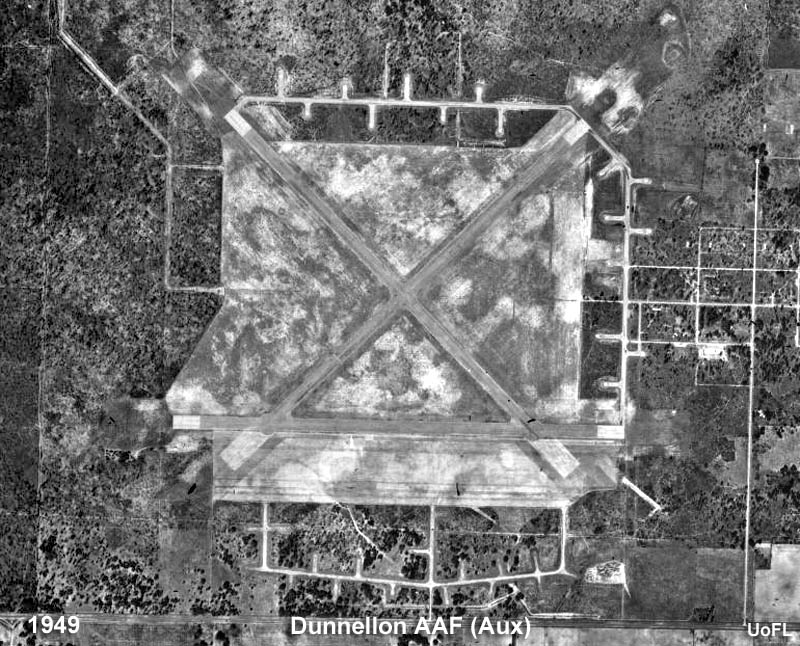
Dunnellon Airport's three runways shortly after WWII (1949)

Originally set on 500 acres (2.0 km^{2}) that was purchased in 1942 by Marion County, the facility was opened in August 1942 by the United States Army Air Forces. Known as Dunnellon Army Air Field, it was used as a training airfield with three runways. Control was deeded to Marion County following the end of the war.

On July 1, 1981, Marion County created the Dunnellon Airport Authority to manage the operation, maintenance and improvement of the airport.

In the 1990s, one runway (designated as 14/32) was closed, reducing the airport to its current two: 5/23 and 10/28 (formerly 9/27).

== See also ==
- List of airports in Florida
