= 10th Flight Test Squadron =

10th Flight Test Squadron

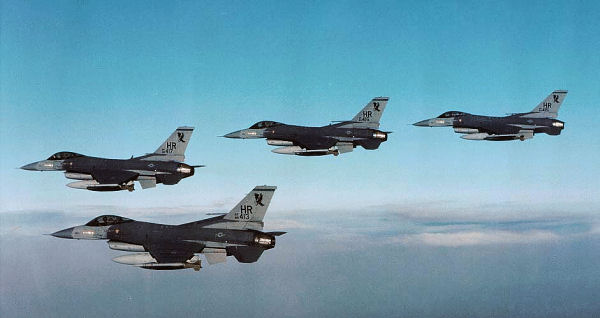
- F-16 Fighting Falcons of the 10th Tactical Fighter Squadron at Hahn Air Base
- Active: 1941-1945; 1950-1951; 1953-1991; 1994 – present
- Country: United States
- Branch: United States Air Force
- Role: Flight Test
- Part of: Air Force Materiel Command
- Garrison/HQ: Tinker Air Force Base
- Engagements: European Theater of Operations; Gulf War
- Decorations: Distinguished Unit Citation; Air Force Outstanding Unit Award

Insignia
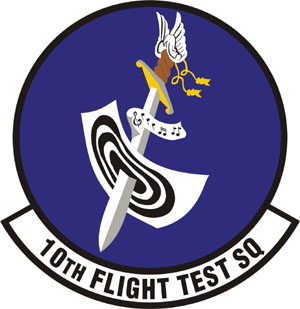
- 10th Flight Test Squadron emblem (approved 17 April 1996) (Note: The emblem was modified to comply with USAF directives requiring squadron emblems to be on a disc. Robertson.)

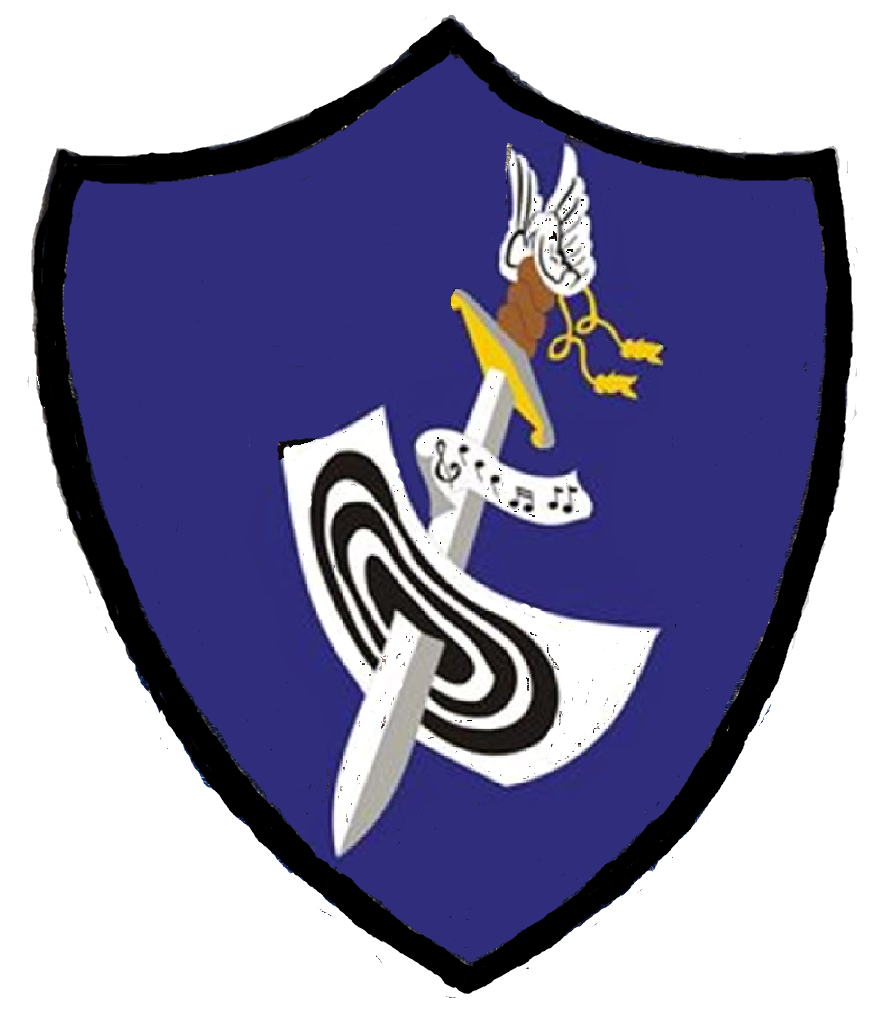
- 10th Fighter-Bomber Squadron emblem (approved 23 July 1953)

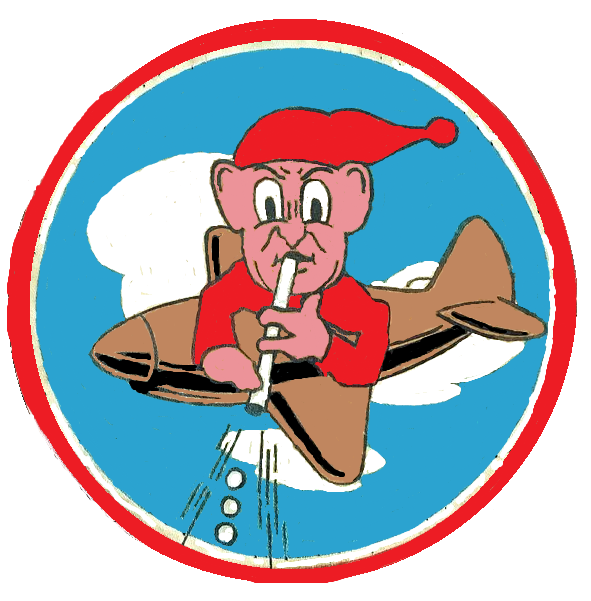
- 10th Fighter Squadron emblem (World War II)

The 10th Flight Test Squadron is part of the 413th Flight Test Group of Air Force Materiel Command based at Tinker Air Force Base, Oklahoma. It performs acceptance testing on refurbished Rockwell B-1 Lancer, Boeing B-52 Stratofortress, Boeing E-3 Sentry, and Boeing KC-135 Stratotanker aircraft before they are returned to their units.

The squadron was first activated as the 10th Pursuit Squadron prior to the entry of the United States into World War II. It served as a test unit as the 10th Fighter Squadron at the Zephyrhills Army Airfield until 1943, when it prepared for deployment to the European Theater of Operations. It remained in combat until V-E Day, earning a Distinguished Unit Citation. The unit returned to the United States in 1945 and was inactivated.

In 1950, the squadron was activated in the reserves. After the start of the Korean War, it was called to active duty, but immediately inactivated and its personnel were transferred to other units.

The squadron was activated in 1953 at Clovis Air Force Base, New Mexico as the 10th Fighter-Bomber Squadron, where it assumed the personnel and equipment of an Air National Guard squadron that was returned to active duty. It moved to Europe later that year, and remained there until inactivating in 1991.

In 1994, the squadron was redesignated the 10th Flight Test Squadron and activated at Tinker Air Force Base, Oklahoma.

== History ==
=== World War II ===
The squadron was initially activated at Selfridge Field, Michigan in January 1941 as the 10th Pursuit Squadron, one of the three original squadrons of the 50th Pursuit Group. It was established under the Northeast Air District as a pursuit squadron, and initially equipped with second-line aircraft. It transferred to Southeast Air District (later Third Air Force) in late 1941 and re-equipped with Curtiss P-40 Warhawks. The squadron trained in the southeast until being transferred to the Army Air Forces School of Applied Tactics in Florida, where it served as a test and demonstration unit.

The 10th, designated as the 10th Fighter Squadron since May 1943, re-equipped with North American P-51 Mustangs and trained as an operational squadron. It deployed to the European Theater of Operations (ETO), where it became part of IX Fighter Command in England in May 1944. It Re-equipped with Republic P-47 Thunderbolts and supported Allied ground forces in France after D-Day, attacking enemy strong points, troop concentrations, armor formations, bridges and other targets. Within a month of the invasion, it moved to Normandy and operated from several forward bases in Northeast France during the summer of 1944 as Allied ground forces moved eastwards towards Germany. The unit supported the Fifth Army movement from southern France though the Lyon Valley, then into Germany as part of the Western Allied invasion in the spring of 1945. The squadron remained in Germany as part of the occupation forces. It returned to the United States and was inactivated in Colorado in November 1945.

=== Air Force reserves ===
The squadron was reactivated in the reserve by Continental Air Command in January 1950 as a corollary unit of the 4th Fighter Wing. It was called to active duty in early 1951 for the Korean War and its personnel were used to fill up other units.

=== Cold War ===
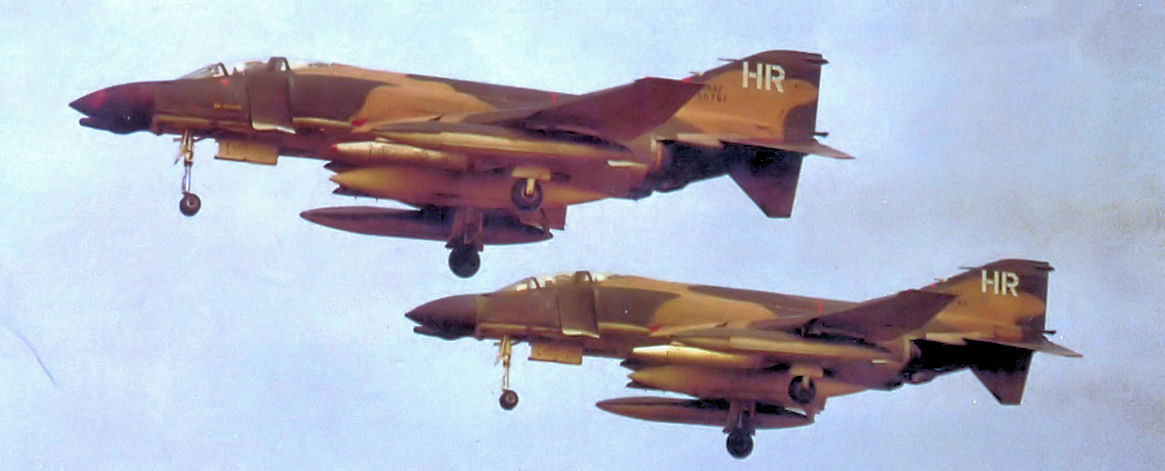
10th TFS McDonnell F-4D Phantoms (Note: Serial Numbers 65-780 and 65-781 landing, circa 1970. Note the irregular tail markings.)

The squadron was activated at Clovis Air Force Base, New Mexico on 1 January 1953 and assumed the personnel and North American F-86H Sabres of the 120th Fighter-Bomber Squadron, a Colorado Air National Guard squadron that had been federalized for the Korean War and was being returned to state control.

The unit deployed to West Germany and assigned to Hahn Air Base as a North Atlantic Treaty Organization (NATO) fighter squadron. It moved briefly to France in 1956, but returned to West Germany in 1959 and flew defensive missions in the F-100, F-4 and F-16 as part of the NATO tactical air forces. In late Dec 1990 the squadron deployed to Southwest Asia, assigned to the 363rd Tactical Fighter Wing (Provisional) from January to May 1991, and flew combat missions during Operation Desert Storm. After returning to Hahn, squadron pilots spent the last summer in Germany flying unit aircraft back across the North Atlantic Ocean to gaining Air National Guard units in preparation for the wing / squadron inactivation in Sep 1991.

=== Flight test ===
The squadron was reactivated at Tinker Air Force Base, Oklahoma in March 1994 as a testing and checkout squadron for supported aircraft after depot-level maintenance prior to the aircraft being returned to active service. The squadron absorbed the personnel, mission and resources of the 10th Test Squadron, which was simultaneously inactivated. (Note: This squadron was activated on 15 January 1988 at Tinker Air Force Base as the 2871st Test Squadron and assigned to Oklahoma City Air Logistics Center. It was redesignated the 10th Test Squadron on 1 October 1992. Air Force Logistics Command Special Order GA-12, 30 December 1987; DAF/MO Letter, 24 September 1992, Subject: Organizational Actions Affecting Certain Air Force Materiel Command Units.)

== Lineage ==
- Constituted as the 10th Pursuit Squadron (Interceptor) on 20 November 1940

Activated on 15 January 1941
Redesignated 10th Fighter Squadron on 15 May 1942
Redesignated 10th Fighter Squadron (Special) on 28 May 1942
Redesignated 10th Fighter Squadron (Single Engine) on 21 January 1944
Redesignated 10th Fighter Squadron, Single Engine on 28 February 1944
Inactivated on 7 November 1945

- Redesignated 10th Fighter Squadron, Jet on 16 December 1949

Activated in the reserve on 28 January 1950
Redesignated 10th Fighter-Interceptor Squadron on 16 March 1950
Redesignated 10th Fighter-Bomber Squadron on 23 January 1951
Ordered to active service on 14 April 1951
Inactivated on 27 April 1951

- Activated on 1 January 1953

Redesignated 10th Tactical Fighter Squadron on 8 July 1958
Inactivated on 30 September 1991

- Redesignated 10th Flight Test Squadron on 1 March 1994

Activated on 18 March 1994

=== Assignments ===
- 50th Pursuit Group (later, 50th Fighter Group), 15 January 1941 – 7 November 1945
- Ninth Air Force, 28 January 1950
- First Air Force, 1 August 1950
- Eastern Air Defense Force, 1 September 1950
- Tactical Air Command, 11 September 1950 - 27 April 1951 (attached to 363d Tactical Reconnaissance Wing until 18 October 1950, 363d Tactical Reconnaissance Group, until 30 November 1950, 136th Fighter-Bomber Wing, until unknown)
- 50th Fighter-Bomber Group, 1 Jan 1953
- 50th Fighter-Bomber Wing (later, 50th Tactical Fighter Wing), 8 December 1957 – 30 September 1991 (attached to 363d Tactical Fighter Wing Provisional, 28 December 1990 – 10 May 1991)
- Oklahoma City Air Logistics Center, 18 March 1994
- 413th Flight Test Group 1 October 2003

=== Stations ===
- Selfridge Field, Michigan, 15 January 1941
- Key Field, Mississippi, 3 October 1941
- Orlando Army Air Base, Florida, 18 March 1942
- Zephyrhills Army Air Field, Florida, 4 January 1943
- Orlando Army Air Base, Florida, 29 January - 13 March 1944
- RAF Lymington (AAF-551), England, 5 April 1944
- Carentan Airfield (A-10), France, 25 June 1944
- Meautis Airfield (A-17), France, 16 August 1944
- Orly Airport (A-47), France, 5 September 1944
- Laon-Athies Air Base (A-63), France, 15 September 1944
- Lyon-Bron Airport (Y-6), France, 29 September 1944
- Toul/Ochey Airfield (A-96), France, 3 November 1944
- AAF Station Giebelstadt, Germany, 20 April 1945
- AAF Station Mannheim/Sandhofen, Germany, 21 May - c. 22 June 1945
- La Junta Army Air Field, Colorado, 6 August - 7 November 1945
- Langley Air Force Base, Virginia, 28 January 1950 – 27 April 1951)
- Clovis Air Force Base, New Mexico, 1 January 1953
- Hahn Air Base, Germany, 11 August 1954
- Toul-Rosières Air Base, France, 10 July 1956
- Hahn Air Base, Germany, 10 December 1959 – 30 September 1991

Deployed to Al Dhafra, United Arab Emirates (28 December 1990 – 10 May 1991)

- Tinker Air Force Base, Oklahoma, 18 March 1994 – Present

=== Aircraft ===
- Vultee BT-13 Valiant (1941–1942)
- Seversky P-35 Guardsman (1941–1942)
- Curtiss P-40 Warhawk (1942–1943)
- North American P-51 Mustang (1943–1944, 1953)
- Republic P-47 Thunderbolt (1944–1945)
- North American F-86 Sabre (1953–1957)
- North American F-100 Super Sabre (1958–1966)
- McDonnell F-4 Phantom II (1966–1982)
- General Dynamics F-16 Fighting Falcon (1982–1991)
- Rockwell B-1 Lancer (1994 – present)
- Boeing B-52 Stratofortress (1994 – present)
- Boeing E-3 Sentry (1994 – present)
- Boeing KC-135 Stratotanker (1994 – present)
- Boeing KC-46 Pegasus (2020 - present)
