= 81st Fighter Squadron =

Inactive squadron of the US Air Force

81st Fighter Squadron

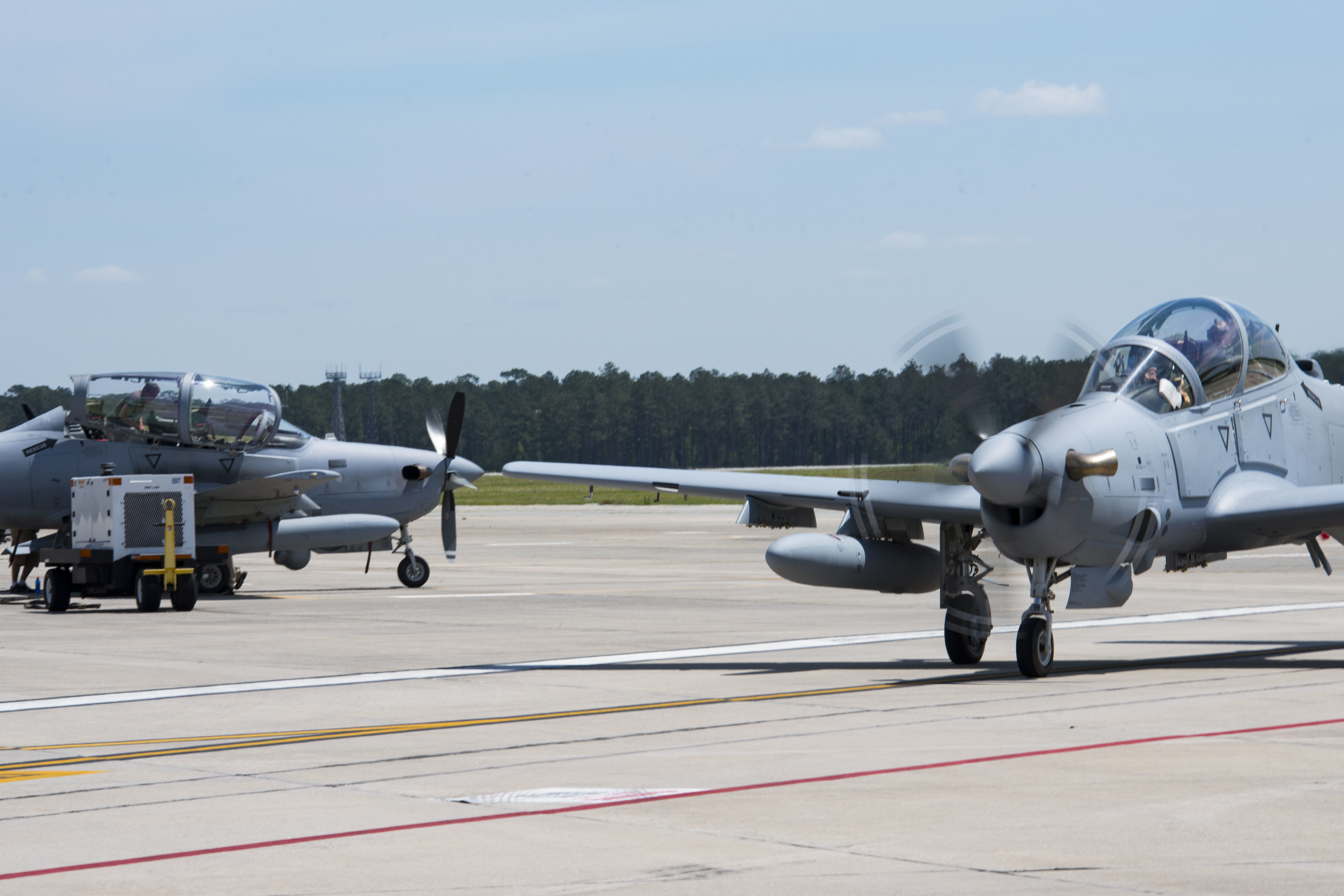
- Two 81st FS A-29 Super Tucanos at Moody AFB in 2018
- Active: 1942–1945; 1947–1951; 1953–2013; 2014–2022
- Country: United States
- Branch: United States Air Force
- Type: Fighter training
- Part of: Air Education and Training Command
- Garrison/HQ: Moody Air Force Base
- Nickname: Panthers
- Engagements: World War II – American Theater World War II – EAME Theater: Air Offensive, Europe; Normandy Campaign; Northern France Campaign; Rhineland Campaign; Ardennes-Alsace Campaign; Central Europe Campaign; Gulf War (Southwest Asia): Defense of Saudi Arabia; Liberation and Defense of Kuwait; Cease Fire Campaign; Kosovo War: Air Campaign; War in Afghanistan: Consolidation I; Consolidation II; Consolidation III

- Decorations: Distinguished Unit Citation Air Force Meritorious Unit Award Air Force Outstanding Unit Award with Combat "V" Device; Air Force Outstanding Unit Award; Cited in Order of the Day, Belgian Army

Insignia
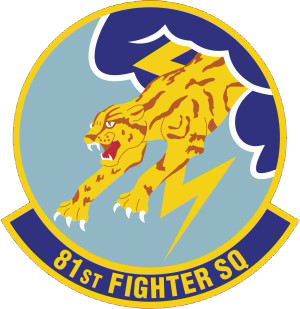
- 81st Fighter Squadron emblem (Approved 3 July 1967, revised 12 April 2007)

The 81st Fighter Squadron (81 FS) is an inactive squadron of the United States Air Force. It was last assigned to Air Education and Training Command, stationed at Moody Air Force Base, Georgia as a geographically separate unit of the 14th Operations Group, 14th Flying Training Wing at Columbus Air Force Base, Mississippi. The squadron last operated the A-29B Super Tucano aircraft, conducting close air support training for allied nations.

The squadron was first activated in 1942 in the aftermath of the Japanese attack on Pearl Harbor, and was tasked with conducting night fighter training to produce trained crews for other squadrons. In 1944, the squadron deployed to England and flew hundreds of combat mission until 1945, including during the invasion of Normandy. In the aftermath of World War II, the squadron was inactivated.

From 1947 to 1951, the squadron briefly served as a reserve unit.

In 1953, the squadron was reactivated and was sent to Hahn Air Base, Germany. The squadron remained stationed in Europe throughout the Cold War and beyond, taking part in the Gulf War, the Kosovo War, and the War in Afghanistan. In 2013, the squadron was inactivated at Spangdahlem Air Base, Germany.

In 2014, the squadron was reactivated at Moody Air Force Base, Georgia as a training unit for counter-insurgency aircraft, training allied nations in close air support operations, a mission it conducted until its most recent inactivation in 2022.

== History ==
=== World War II ===
The squadron was first activated on 15 January 1942, at Key Field, Mississippi, as the 81st Pursuit Squadron flying the P-40 Warhawk. The squadron was assigned to the 50th Fighter Group to replace the 11th Pursuit Squadron, which had been transferred after the Japanese attack on Pearl Harbor to reinforce the air defenses of Alaska. In May 1942 the 50th Group was assigned to the Fighter Command School of the Army Air Forces School of Applied Tactics and the 81st became the 81st Fighter Squadron (Special).

Night fighter combat over the skies of England made the Army Air Forces aware of the need for night air defense training and tactics development. The Air Defense Operational Training Unit had been established on 26 March. Later it was renamed the Fighter Command School. The 81st Fighter Squadron became responsible for night fighter training, using Douglas P-70 Havocs. The 81st was assigned the "daunting task" of training sufficient crews to man seventeen night fighter squadrons within twelve months, initially " [w]ith no trained instructor pilots or [radar operator]s, no aircraft, no radar, and no communications equipment" The original night fighter crews were recruited from 27 pilots from the 50th Group who were qualified to fly twin-engine aircraft. They attended transition training school at Williams Field, Arizona before returning to Florida.

In October 1942 the 81st moved to Orlando Army Air Field Florida. By the end of September, the Army Air Forces School of Applied Tactics Night Fighter Department had been activated and the 81st Fighter Squadron was detached from the 50th Group and placed under the Department for training and operations. In October 1942, the personnel and equipment of the 81st squadron provided the manpower and equipment for the newly formed 348th and 349th Night Fighter Squadrons, and the squadron was remanned.

The 81st helped test procedures and equipment, seeking better ways to manage the huge efforts required to supply troops and maintain aircraft fighting overseas. In 1943 the 81st moved to Cross City Army Air Field, Florida, while the 50th Fighter Group remained headquartered at Orlando. Each of the 50th Fighter Group's detached squadrons (including the 81st) returned to Orlando AAF in January 1944. The squadron continued to train and teach at Orlando AAF while preparing to ship out to England.

In March 1944, the 81st was re-equipped the P-47 Thunderbolt and shipped to England with the 9th Air Force. Between April 1944 and the V-E Day in May 1945, the unit flew hundreds of fighter escort, close air support, and interdiction missions, taking part in the D-Day invasion and operating from numerous advanced landing bases in Europe while covering the US Army's advance. The squadron received two Distinguished Unit Citations for combat, was credited with 30 aerial victories, and produced the 50th Fighter Group's only ace, Major Robert D. Johnston.

The unit was inactivated on 7 November 1945 at La Junta Army Air Field, Colorado.

=== Reserve operations ===
It was reactivated at McChord Field, Washington in July 1947, where the 81st tested a number of different aircraft.

=== European Service ===
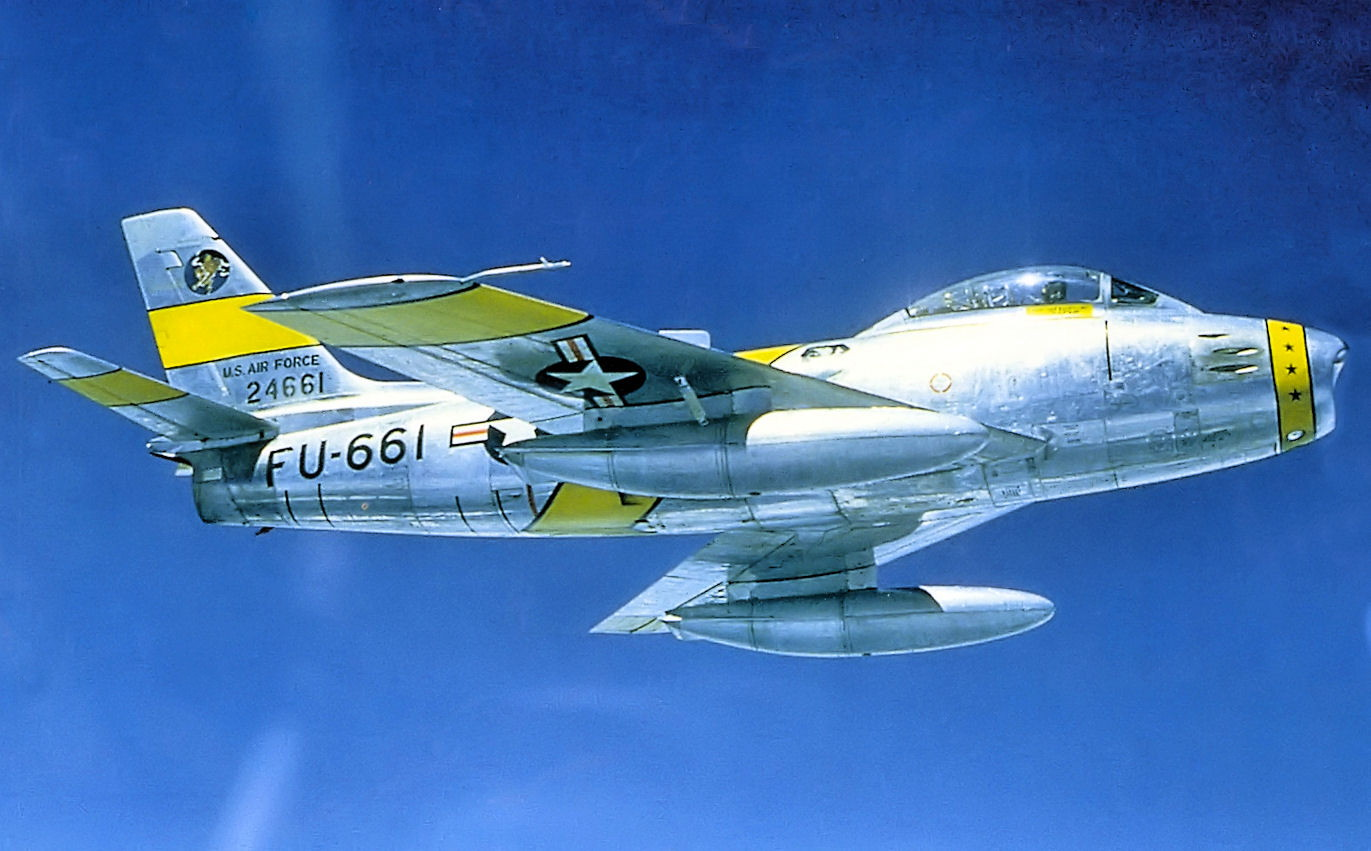
An 81st FBS F-86F Sabre over Germany in the 1950s

On 1 January 1953 the 81st was established at Clovis Air Force Base, New Mexico where it briefly flew the F-51 Mustang before transitioning to the F-86 Sabre in the spring of 1953. In August 1953, the squadron relocated to Hahn Air Base, Germany.

In July 1956, the 81st moved to Toul-Rosières Air Base, France, converting to the F-100 Super Sabre in July 1958. One year later, it returned to Hahn Air Base and in December 1966, re-equipped with the F-4 Phantom II. The squadron took their Phantoms to Zweibrücken Air Base, Germany, in June 1971 to fill the vacancy left by the departure of the Canadian Forces.

In 1973, the 81st moved to the 52d Tactical Fighter Wing at Spangdahlem Air Base, Germany, where it took on the Wild Weasel mission of defense suppression. As NATO's only defense suppression squadron, the 81st received the first 24 F-4G advanced Wild Weasels equipped with the APR-38 Radar Attack and Warning System. In 1984, the 81st FS transitioned to a mixed F-4G and F-4E hunter/killer team, using the AGM-88 HARM and AGM-45 Shrike, as the 52d TFW became the only defense suppression wing in NATO.

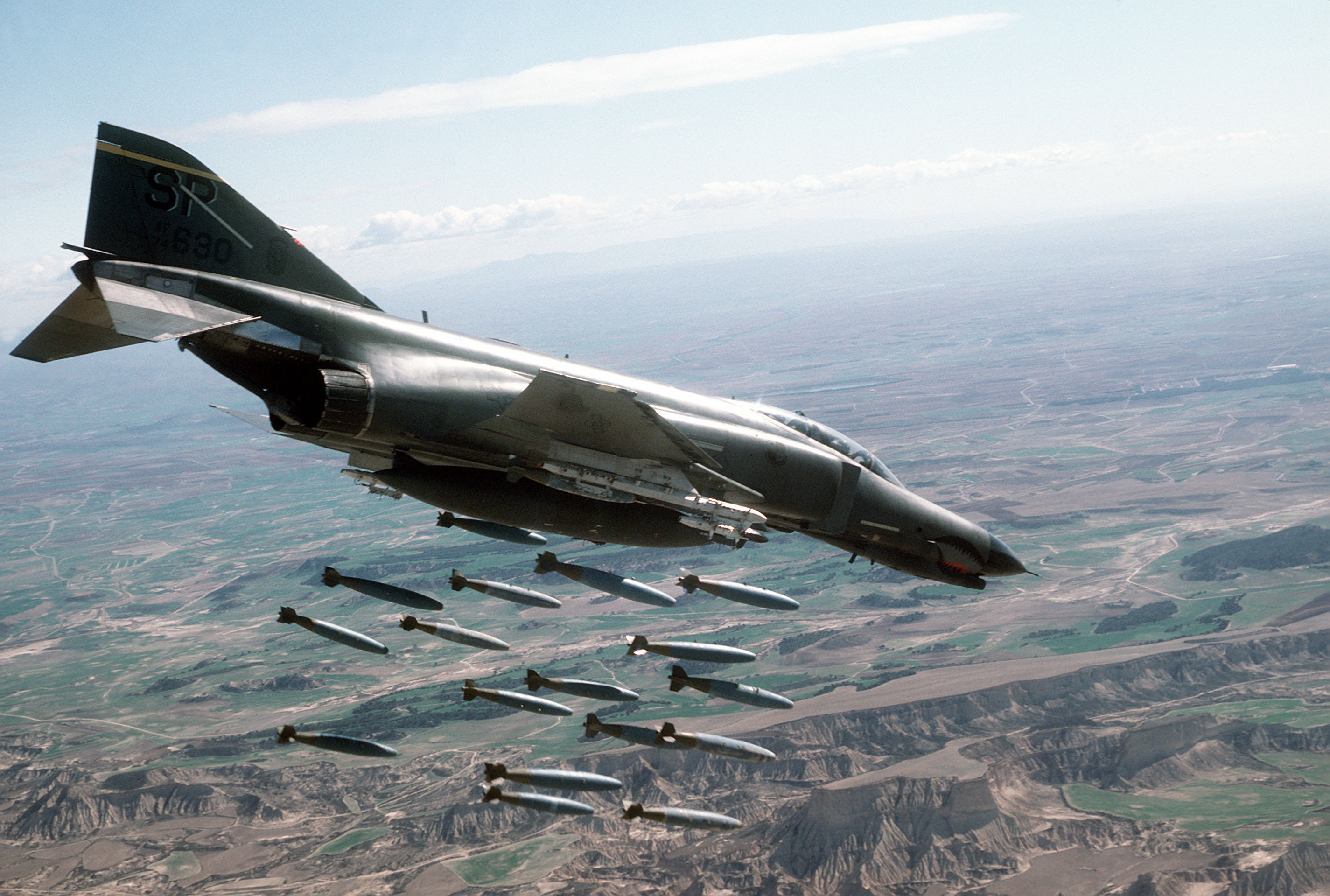
An 81st TFS F-4E Phantom II releases bombs over Bardenas Reales Gunnery Range, Spain in 1986

The 81st converted its F-4E aircraft to the F-16 Fighting Falcon in January 1988, becoming a member of the only wing in the U.S. Air Force to fly two different aircraft in the same combat element. In June 1988 the squadron upgraded its F-4G with the APR-47. The 81st FS crews flew the F-4G and F-16C in the hunter/killer role until December 1993, when the unit again became an all F-16C/D Block 50 squadron. It served until 31 December 1993, where they racked up 113 radar kills, flew more than 12,000 combat sorties and 25,000 hours over Iraq.

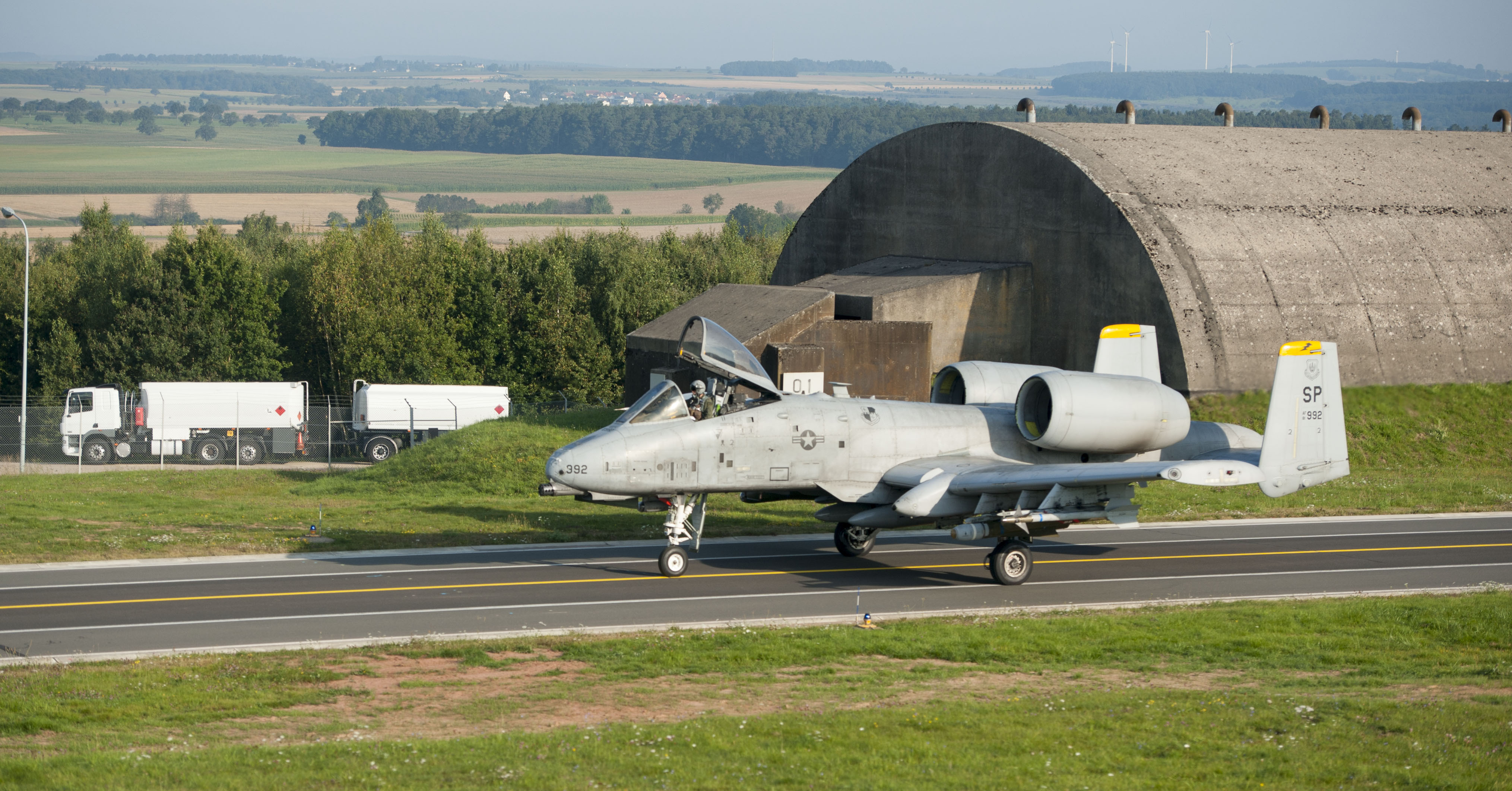
An 81st FS A-10 Thunderbolt II at Spangdahlem AB in 2012

The last F-4G left Spangdahlem Air Base 18 February 1994. The 81st then became an A/OA-10 squadron and replaced the 510th Fighter Squadron at Spangdahlem Air Base. During this period, the squadron continuously deployed to Aviano Air Base, Italy in support of Operation Deny Flight, enforcing a no-fly zone over Bosnia and Herzegovina. In September 1997, it became the first U.S. Air Forces Europe squadron to participate in Operation Southern Watch, enforcing the United Nations imposed no-fly zone in southern Iraq.

Members of the 81st again deployed to Aviano Air Base in October 1998, supporting NATO air presence during the crisis in Kosovo, Yugoslavia. The 81st FS returned to Aviano Air Base in January 1999 for a regular contingency rotation, but then stayed to support Operation Allied Force. The squadron supported air operations from Aviano Air Base until 11 April 1999, when it moved to Gioia del Colle, Italy. From there, the unit flew more than 1,400 combat missions throughout Operation Allied Force and led the first large force packages in A-10 history. The 81st also led the first two successful combat search and rescue task force missions, which involved coordinating all rescue assets resulting in the rescue of downed F-117 and F-16 pilots.

In September 2000, the 81st deployed 12 aircraft to Southwest Asia for Operation Southern Watch, accumulating more than 700 combat and training sorties. Immediately following the deployment, the 81st FS was additionally tasked to participate in Croatian Phiblex 2000. The squadron generated and deployed their remaining 6 A/OA-10s and 183 people to Split, Croatia, to aid U.S. Marine and U.S. Navy forces in a joint amphibious landing exercise with Croatian military forces and support another real-world contingency.

The squadron deployed several times to Bagram Air Base, Afghanistan to provide close air support to coalition ground forces during Operation Enduring Freedom in June 2003, September 2004, and most recently May 2006. During the 2006 deployment the squadron performed an intensive regimen of combat patrols to find, fix and destroy elusive, guerrilla-type enemy combatants in support of ground forces, flying in excess of 2,000 combat sorties and 7,600 combat hours. The 81st employed over 109,000 rounds of 30mm, dropped 350 guided and conventional bombs, and fired over 325 rockets in support of 260 Coalition force operations. As a direct result of the combat action in the 2006 deployment two pilots in the 81st won the prestigious Mackay Trophy and the Daedalian Exceptional Pilot Awards.

The first A-10C arrived in May 2009, after receiving the Precision Engagement upgrade, which significantly increased the Warthog's already impressive precision and lethality with a digital stores system, integration of advanced targeting pods, hands on throttle and stick (HOTAS) functionality and Situational Awareness Data-Link (SADL). The Panthers returned to Afghanistan with the A-10C in May 2010, this time to Kandahar AB in the south. Despite the heat, wind and dust, the 81 FS flew over 9,500 hours on over 2,100 sorties and employed over 70,000 rounds of 30mm, 159 precision weapons and 141 rockets while again providing precision close air support to OEF and ISAF operations.

The 81st has earned the 1991, 1996, and 2006 USAFE Commander's Trophy.

On 18 June 2013, the squadron was inactivated at Spangdahlem Air Base as the last A-10 squadron permanently stationed in Europe.

=== Light attack training ===
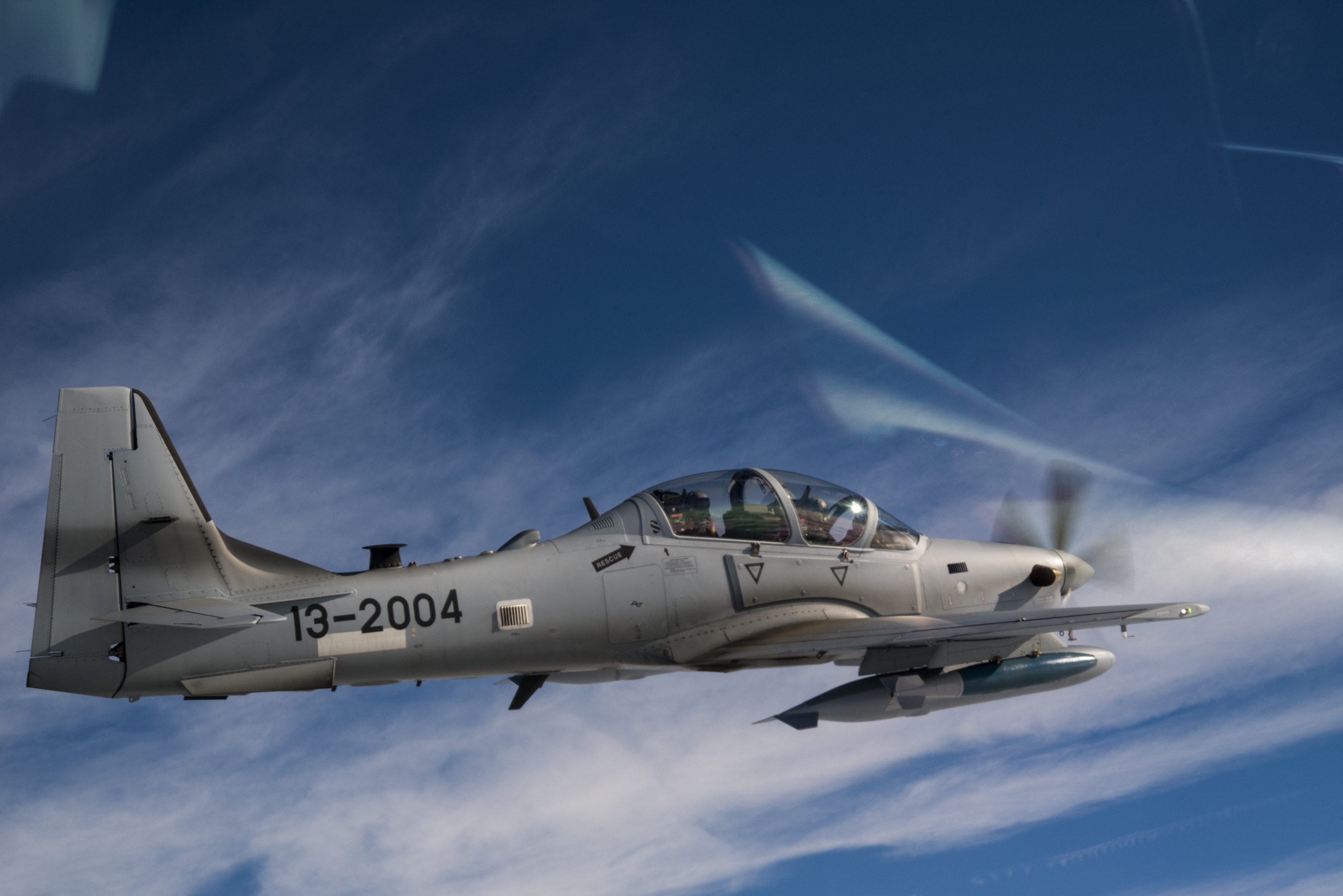
An 81st FS A-29 Super Tucano over Moody AFB in 2015

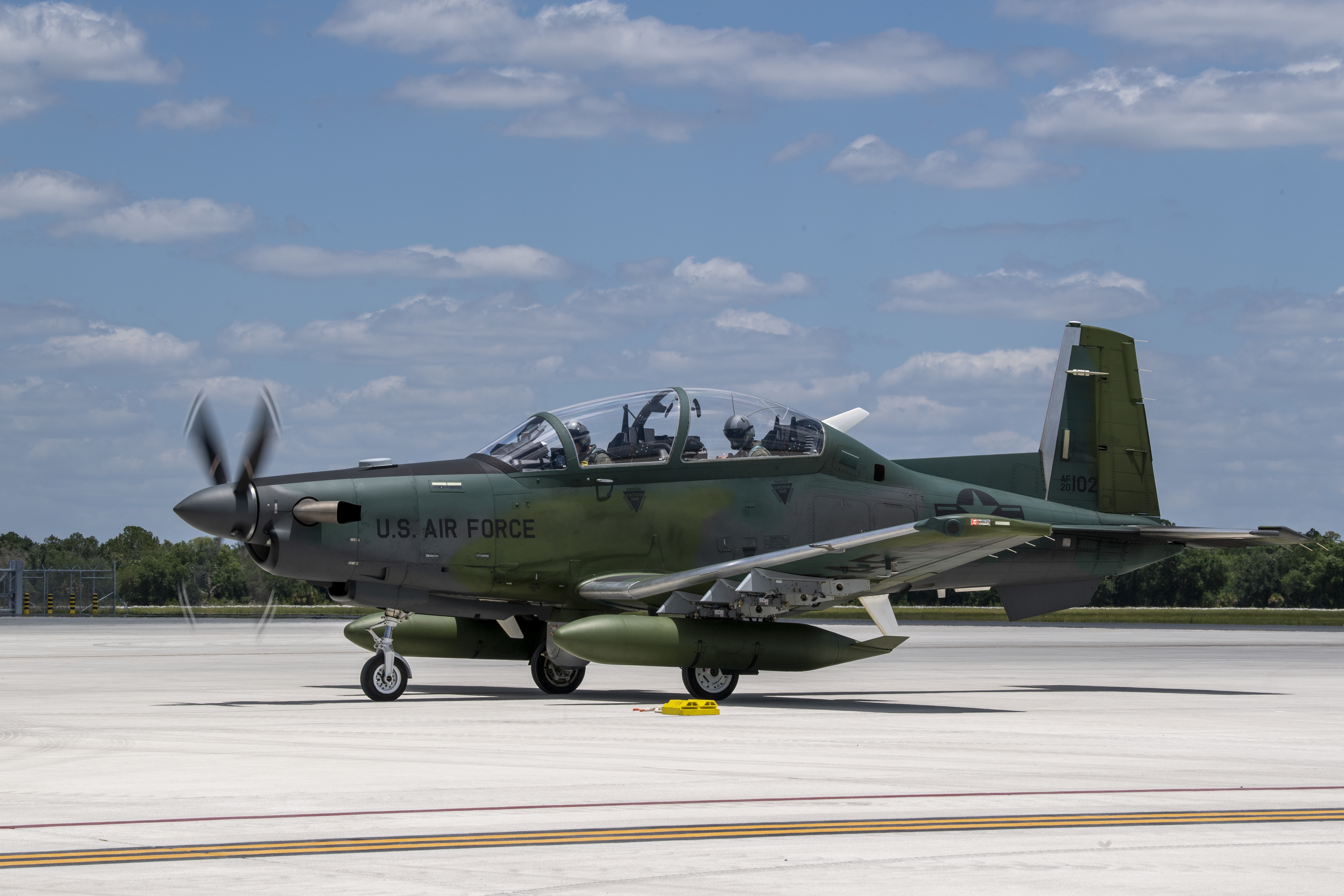
An AT-6E Wolverine operated by 81st FS pilots on loan to the 23rd Wing at Moody AFB in 2022

The squadron was reactivated at Moody Air Force Base on 1 October 2014 as part of the 14th Flying Training Wing flying the A-29 Super Tucano. By December 2014 the initial cadre of pilot and maintenance trainers and three A-29s were in place.

The A-29s, designed for light air support, were used to support the Afghan training mission at Moody. The final Afghan Air Force class graduated at Moody AFB on 13 November 2020, with the program having produced more than 30 pilots and 70 maintenance technicians across a span of five years. The entire effort was lost with the collapse of the Afghan state the next year in the 2021 Taliban offensive.

From September 2020 to September 2021, the 81st Fighter Squadron hosted training classes for pilots and ground personnel of the Nigerian Air Force's 407th Air Combat Training Group. The training familiarized the Nigerian airmen with the operation of the A-29 Super Tucano, after the Nigerian government procured 12 A-29s.

From January to June 2022, pilots from the 81st Fighter Squadron were loaned out to Air Combat Command's 23rd Wing and operated two AT-6E Wolverine aircraft, also on loan to the wing. They took part in a collaboration between the USAF and partner forces from Colombia, Nigeria, Thailand, and Tunisia in order to develop procedures for countering "violent extremist organizations".

On 6 December 2022, the squadron was inactivated during a ceremony at Moody Air Force Base. The 81st FS was AETC's only combat mission ready fighter squadron.

== Lineage ==
- Constituted as the 81st Pursuit Squadron (Interceptor) on 6 January 1942

Activated on 15 January 1942
Redesignated 81st Fighter Squadron on 15 May 1942
Redesignated 81st Fighter Squadron (Special) on 28 May 1942
Redesignated 81st Fighter Squadron (Single Engine) on 21 January 1944
Redesignated 81st Fighter Squadron, Single Engine on 28 February 1944
Inactivated on 7 November 1945

- Redesignated 81st Fighter Squadron (All Weather) on 13 May 1947

Activated in the Reserve on 12 July 1947
Redesignated 81st Fighter Squadron, Jet on 20 June 1949
Redesignated 81st Fighter-Interceptor Squadron on 1 March 1950
Ordered to active service on 1 June 1951
Inactivated on 2 June 1951

- Redesignated 81st Fighter-Bomber Squadron on 15 November 1952

Activated on 1 January 1953
Redesignated 81st Tactical Fighter Squadron on 8 July 1958
Redesignated 81st Fighter Squadron on 1 October 1991.
Inactivated on 18 June 2013

- Activated on 1 October 2014

Inactivated on 6 December 2022

=== Assignments ===
- 50th Pursuit (later, 50th Fighter) Group, 15 January 1942 – 7 November 1945
- 454th Bombardment Group, 12 July 1947
- 50th Fighter (later, 50th Fighter Interceptor) Group, 20 June 1949 – 2 June 1951
- 50th Fighter-Bomber Group, 1 January 1953
- 50th Fighter-Bomber (later, 50th Tactical Fighter) Wing, 8 December 1957
- 86th Tactical Fighter Wing, 15 July 1971
- 52d Tactical Fighter (later, 52d Fighter) Wing, 15 January 1973
- 52d Operations Group, 31 March 1992–18 June 2013
- 14th Operations Group, 1 October 2014 – 6 December 2022

=== Stations ===
- Selfridge Field, Michigan, 15 January 1941
- Key Field, Mississippi, 3 October 1941
- Orlando Army Air Base, Florida, 22 March 1943
- Cross City Army Airfield, Florida, Jun 1943 - 1 Feb 1944
- Alachua Army Airfield, Florida, 20 November 1943
- Orlando Army Air Base, Florida, 1 February – 13 March 1944
- RAF Lymington (AAF-551), England, 5 April 1944
- Carentan Airfield (A-10), France, 25 June 1944
- Meautis Airfield (A-17), France, 16 August 1944
- Orly Airfield (A-47), France, 4 September 1944
- Lyon-Bron Airport (Y-6), France, 28 September 1944
- Toul/Ochey Airfield (A-96), France, 3 November 1944
- Giebelstadt Airfield (Y-90), Germany, 20 April 1945
- AAF Station Mannheim/Sandhofen, Germany, 21 May–June 1945
- La Junta Army Air Field, Colorado, 4 August – 7 November 1945
- McChord Field, Washington, 12 July 1947
- Otis Air Force Base, Massachusetts, 20 June 1949 – 2 June 1951
- Clovis Air Force Base, New Mexico, 1 January – 22 July 1953
- Hahn Air Base, West Germany, 10 August 1953
- Toul-Rosières Air Base, France, 10 July 1956
- Hahn Air Base, West Germany (1959–1971)
- Zweibrücken Air Base, West Germany, 15 June 1971 – 15 January 1973
- Spangdahlem Air Base, West Germany (later Germany), 15 January 1973 – 18 June 2013
- Moody Air Force Base, Georgia, 1 October 2014

=== Aircraft ===
- P-40 Warhawk (1942–1943)
- P-47 Thunderbolt (1943–1945)
- F-51 Mustang (1953)
- F-86 Sabre (1953–1958)
- F-100 Super Sabre (1958–1966)
- F-4 Phantom II (1966–1994)
- F-16 Fighting Falcon (1987–1990)
- A-10 Thunderbolt II (1994–2013)
- A-29 Super Tucano (2014–2022)

=== Operations ===
- World War II
- Operation Northern Watch
- Operation Southern Watch
- Operation Deny Flight
- Operation Allied Force
- Operation Enduring Freedom
- Operation Odyssey Dawn
