= RAF Lymington =

RAF airbase in England

RAF Lymington USAAF Station AAF-551
- Near Lymington, Hampshire in England
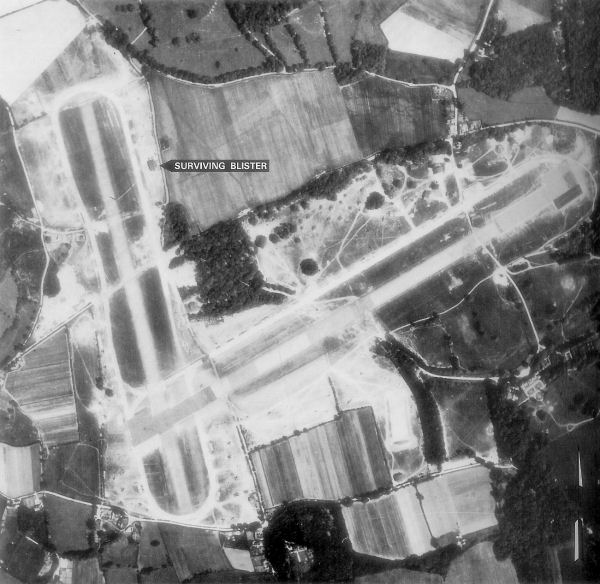
- Lymington Airfield - 22 May 1944

Site information
- Type: Royal Air Force Advanced landing ground
- Code: LY
- Owner: Air Ministry
- Operator: Royal Air Force; United States Army Air Forces
- Controlled by: Ninth Air Force

Location
- Shown within Hampshire RAF Lymington (the United Kingdom)
- Coordinates: 50°45′59″N 001°30′46″W

Site history
- Built: 1943
- In use: 1944-1946
- Battles/wars: European Theatre of World War II; Air Offensive, Europe July 1942 - May 1945

Airfield information
Runways
Direction	Length and surface
00/00
00/00

Royal Air Force Lymington or more simply RAF Lymington is a former Royal Air Force Advanced landing ground in Hampshire, England. The airfield is located approximately 1 mile (1.6 km) east of Lymington.

Opened in 1944, Lymington was a prototype for the type of temporary Advanced Landing Ground type airfield which would be built in France after D-Day, when the need for advanced landing fields would become urgent as the Allied forces moved east across France and Germany. It was used by the Royal Air Force, Canadian and the United States Army Air Forces. It was closed in 1946 after two years of being utilized as a storage area for the Royal Navy.

Today the airfield is a mixture of agricultural fields with a private grass airfield using the North/South runway.

== USAAF use ==
Lymington was known as USAAF Station AAF-551 for security reasons by the USAAF during the war, and by which it was referred to instead of location. Its USAAF Station Code was "LY".

=== 50th Fighter Group ===
RAF Lymington saw the arrival of the USAAF 50th Fighter Group on 5 April 1944, the group arriving from Orlando AAF, Florida. The 50th had the following operational squadrons:

- 10th Fighter Squadron (T5)
- 81st Fighter Squadron (2N)
- 313th Fighter Squadron (W3)

The 50th was a group of Ninth Air Force's 84th Fighter Wing, IX Tactical Air Command. It flew the Republic P-47 Thunderbolt. The group ended operations at Giebelstadt, Germany in May 1945, and returned to the United States in August.

== Civil use ==
With the facility released from military control in 1946, almost all traces of the former airfield were removed.

One of the original blister hangars remains on the standing today adjacent to a private grass airstrip (Pylewell House) overlaid on the site of the former N/S military airfield runway, (31/13). The airfield appears to be closed, with white "X"s shown on the runway ends.

== See also ==
- List of former Royal Air Force stations
