= 313th Tactical Fighter Squadron =

313th Tactical Fighter Squadron

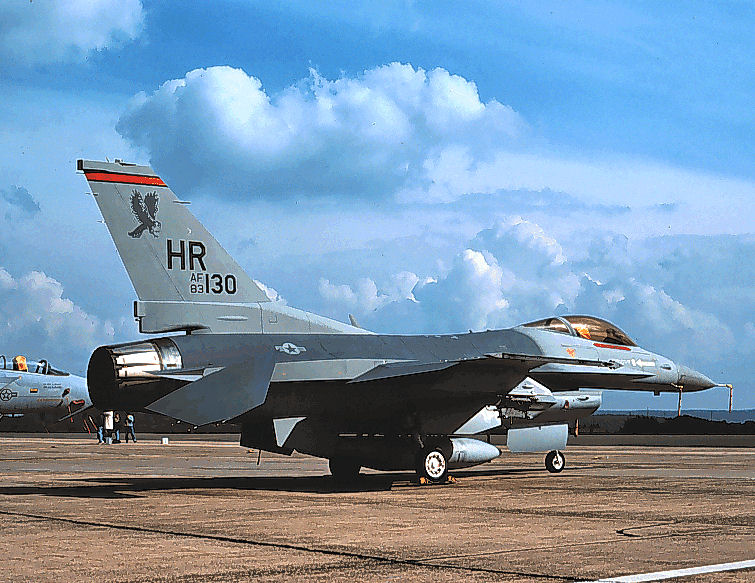
- 313th Tactical Fighter Squadron F-16C Fighting Falcon (Note: Aircraft is General Dynamics F-16C Block 25A Fighting Falcon serial 83-1130, taken in 1986.)
- Active: 1942-1945; 1976-1991
- Country: United States
- Branch: United States Air Force
- Role: Fighter
- Part of: United States Air Forces Europe
- Motto(s): Lucky 313th Tac Fighter Squadron
- Engagements: European Theater of Operations
- Decorations: Distinguished Unit Citation; Air Force Outstanding Unit Award; Cited in Order of the Day, Belgian Army

Insignia
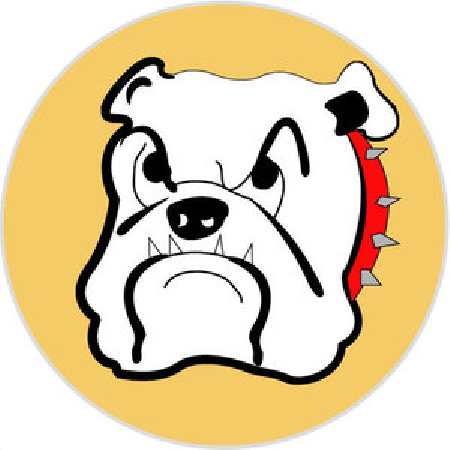
- 313th Tactical Fighter Squadron emblem (approved 16 November 1942)

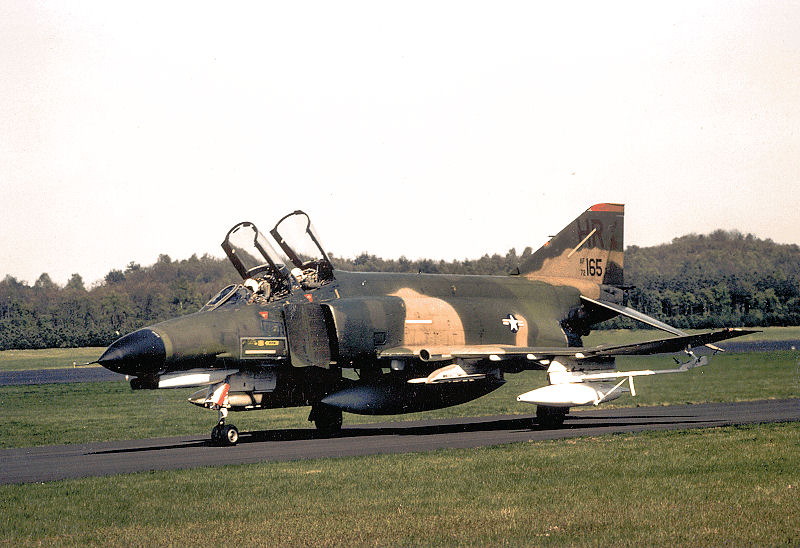
313th TFS McDonnell Douglas F-4E Phantom - 72–0165, about 1980

The 313th Tactical Fighter Squadron is an inactive United States Air Force unit. It was last assigned to the 50th Tactical Fighter Wing and stationed at Hahn Air Base, Germany.

== History ==
=== World War II ===
Established under the Northeast Air District as a pursuit squadron, initially equipped with second-line aircraft. Transferred to Southeast Air District (later Third Air Force) in late 1941, re-equipped with Curtiss P-40 Warhawks. Trained in the southeast, becoming a training squadron at the Army Air Forces School of Applied Tactics in Florida in 1943.

Re-equipped with North American P-51 Mustangs and trained as an operational squadron, being deployed to the European Theater of Operations, being assigned to IX Fighter Command in England in May 1944. Re-equipped with Republic P-47 Thunderbolts, the squadron supported Allied ground forces in France after D-Day, attacking enemy strong points, troop concentrations, armor formations, bridges and other targets. Moved to Normandy and operated from several forward bases in Northeast France during the summer of 1944 as Allied ground forces moved eastwards towards Germany. Supported the Fifth Army movement from Southern France though the Lyon Valley, then into Occupied Germany as part of the Western Allied invasion in the spring of 1945. Remained in Germany as part of the United States Air Forces in Europe occupation forces, demobilizing over the summer. Inactivated in Colorado, November 1945.

=== European fighter operations ===
Reactivated on 15 November 1976 at Hahn Air Base, Germany, but remained nonoperational through 26 December. From this perspective the 313th made a huge jump from P-47 Thunderbolts to the McDonnell F-4E Phantom II. In 1981 the 313th became the first unit to operate the General Dynamics F-16 Fighting Falcon in USAFE. Inactivated at the end of the Cold War on 30 December 1991.

== Lineage ==
- Constituted 313th Pursuit Squadron (Interceptor)' on 21 January 1942.

Activated on 9 February 1942
Redesignated 313th Fighter Squadron on 15 May 1942
Redesignated 313th Fighter Squadron (Special) on 28 May 1942
Redesignated 313th Fighter Squadron, Single Engine c. 21 January 1944
Inactivated on 7 November 1945

- Redesignated 313th Tactical Fighter Squadron on 1 November 1976

Activated on 15 November 1976
Inactivated on 30 December 1991

=== Assignments ===
- 50th Pursuit Group (later 50th Fighter Group), 9 February 1942 – 7 November 1945
- 50th Tactical Fighter Wing, 15 November 1976 – 30 December 1991

=== Stations ===
- Selfridge Field, Michigan, 9 February 1942
- Key Field, Mississippi, 3 October 1941
- Orlando Army Air Base, Florida, 22 March 1943
- Alachua Army Air Field, Florida, 20 November 1943
- Orlando Army Air Base, Florida, 1 February–13 March 1944
- RAF Lymington (AAF-551), England, 5 April 1944
- Carentan Airfield (A-10), France, 25 June 1944
- Meautis Airfield (A-17), France, 16 August 1944
- Orly Airfield (A-47), France, 4 September 1944
- Lyon-Bron Airport (Y-6), France, 28 September 1944
- Toul/Ochey Airfield (A-96), France, 3 November 1944
- Giebelstadt Airfield (Y-90), Germany, 20 April 1945
- AAF Station Mannheim/Sandhofen (Y-79), Germany, 21 May–June 1945
- La Junta Army Air Field, Colorado, 4 August–7 November 1945
- Hahn Air Base, West Germany, 15 November 1976 – 30 December 1991

=== Aircraft ===
- BT-13 Valiant, 1941–1942
- P-35 Guardsman, 1941–1942
- Curtiss P-40 Warhawk, 1942-1943
- North American P-51 Mustang, 1943–1944
- Republic P-47 Thunderbolt, 1943-1945
- McDonnell F-4E Phantom II, 1976–1981
- General Dynamics F-16 Fighting Falcon, 1981–1991
