= Keystone Army Air Field =

United States Army, Air Force, Airfield

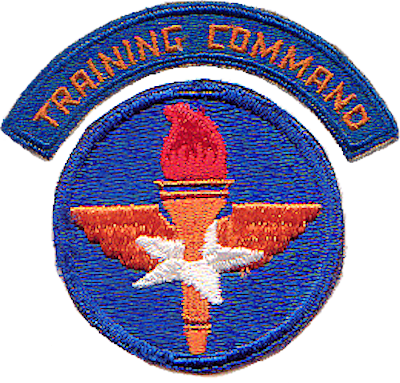
Keystone Army Airfield
- Part of Army Air Force Training Command
- Located near: Keystone Heights, Florida
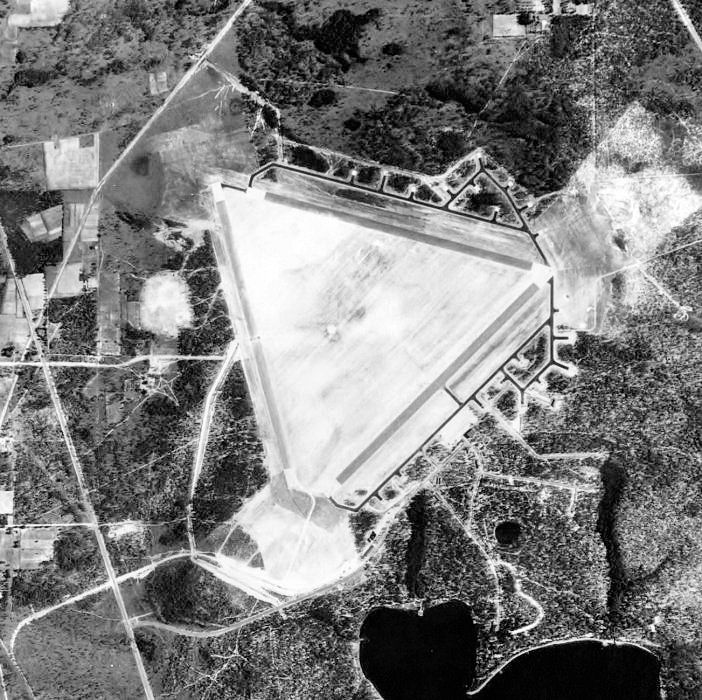
- Keystone Army Airfield - 1943

Location
- Coordinates: 29°50′41″N 082°02′51″W

Site history
- In use: 1940-1945

Keystone Army Airfield, was a World War II United States Army Air Forces airfield, located 4.2 miles (6.8 km) north-northwest of Keystone Heights, Florida.

== History ==
The airport was constructed in 1942 as Crystal Lake Airfield and was commissioned in December 1942 as Keystone Army Airfield (AAF) by the United States Army Air Forces. It was used as part of the Air University's Army Air Forces School of Applied Tactics (AAFSAT) tactical combat simulation school in Central and Northern Florida. Kaystone AAF was assigned as a sub-base of Alachua Army Airfield, near Gainesville.

=== Strategic Reconnaissance School ===
During the war, Keystone AAF was the home of the AAFSAT Strategic Reconnaissance School. The 432d Tactical Reconnaissance Group was moved in early March 1943 from Alachua as the Operational Training Unit (OTU), although its component, 3d Tactical Reconnaissance Squadron was assigned to Keystone in January in an attached status from the AAFSAT Air Support Department.

At Keystone, students flew the F-3A Havoc (a version of the A-20 Havoc attack aircraft), and the P-39D-3 Reconnaissance version of the Airacobra fighter. The L-2 and L-3 Grasshopper light observation aircraft were also utilized. Pilots were trained in battlefield reconnaissance as well as long-range strategic reconnaissance photography, evasion techniques and other skills necessary for the unarmed combat reconnaissance missions to assist fighter, bombardment, and ground units.

In November 1943, the 313th Fighter Squadron was moved from Alachua with P-40 Warhawks. The 313th was part of the AAFSAT 50th Fighter Group which trained single-engine pilots in combat maneuvers. Crowded conditions at Alachua and the phasedown of the photo-reconnaissance school at Keystone were the reasons necessitating the move of the 313th. The 313th FS was upgraded to P-47D Thunderbolts in July 1943.

Phase-down of Keystone AAF began in late 1943 when the 432d was inactivated on 1 November 1943, and the 3d TRS was moved back to Orlando Army Air Base in early February 1944. The 313th FS was moved back to Orlando in January in preparation for its parent 50th Fighter Group being sent to the European Theater of Operations (ETO) as an operational fighter group under Ninth Air Force.

=== Closure ===
With the operational squadrons leaving, a caretaker unit was assigned and the flying mission at the airfield was reduced to the support of transient aircraft using Keystone for landings and cross-country flights. The number of personnel were reduced, being reassigned to other bases.

In January 1945, AAFSAT sent down orders to close the facility, and it was placed on inactive status on 1 February 1945. Jurisdiction of the airfield was transferred to Air Technical Service Command (ATSC), whose mission was the transfer of any useful military equipment to other bases around the country. Under ATSC, buildings and equipment were sold and any useful military equipment was transferred to other bases around the country. The base was declared as surplus in 1946 and was turned over to the War Assets Administration (WAA) for disposal and return to civil use.

The City of Keystone Heights acquired the property from the federal government in 1947.

=== Major units assigned ===
- 432d Reconnaissance Group, 1 March-1 November 1943
- 3d Tactical Reconnaissance Squadron, 21 January 1943 – 3 February 1944
- 313th Fighter Squadron, 17 November 1943 – 28 January 1944

== See also ==
- Florida World War II Army Airfields
- Army Air Force School of Applied Tactics
- Wings of Dreams
