= Méautis =

- Commune
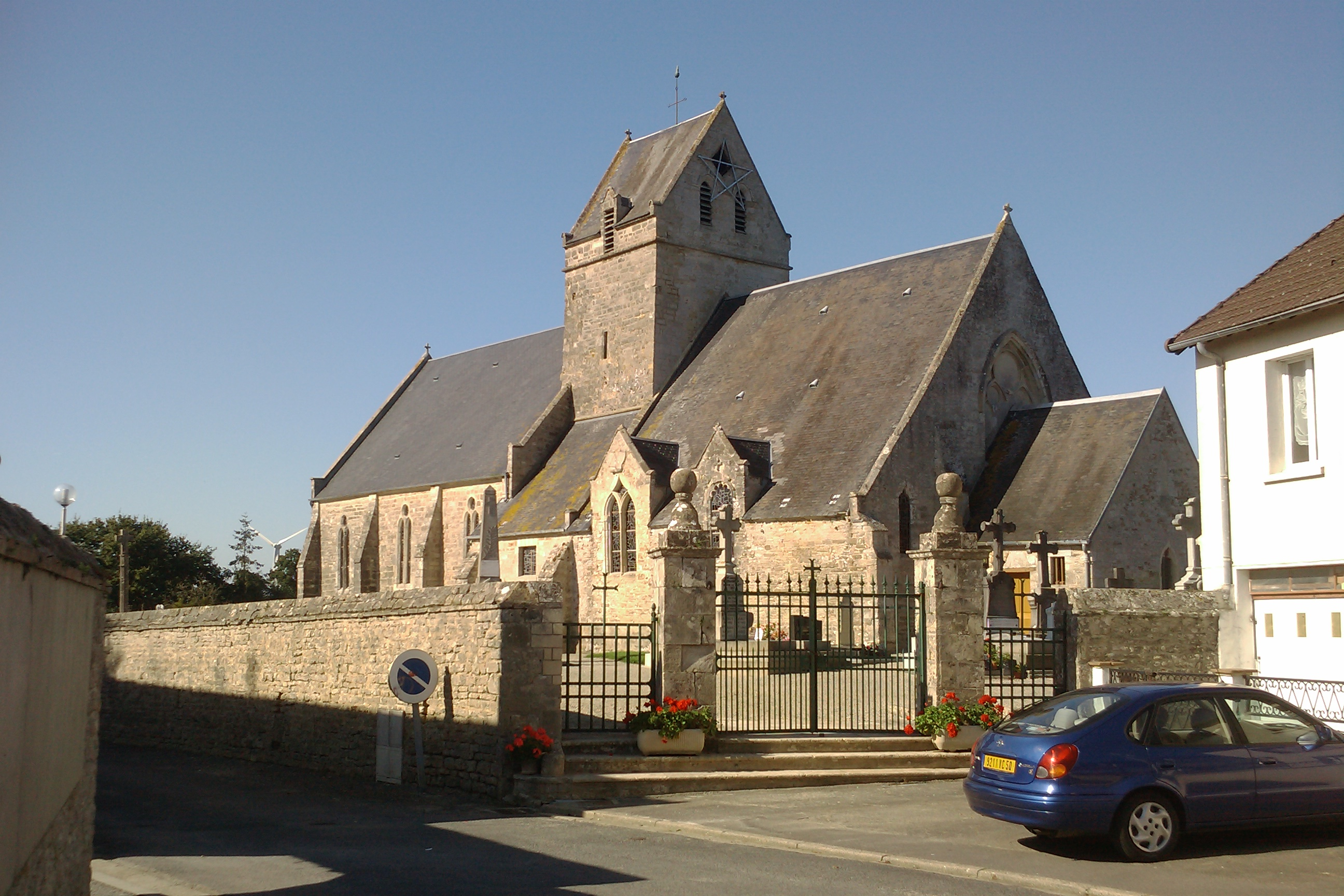
- The church of Saint-Hilaire
- Location of Méautis
- Location within France Location within Normandy
- Coordinates: 49°16′42″N 1°17′59″W
- Country: France
- Region: Normandy
- Department: Manche
- Arrondissement: Saint-Lô
- Canton: Carentan-les-Marais
- Intercommunality: Baie du Cotentin

Government
  - Mayor (2020–2026): Murielle Larue
- Area^{1}: 16.98 km^{2} (6.56 sq mi)
- Elevation: 42 m (138 ft)
- Highest elevation: 29 m (95 ft)
- Lowest elevation: 0 m (0 ft)
- Population (2023): 648
  - Density: 38.2/km^{2} (98.8/sq mi)
- Time zone: UTC+01:00 (CET)
  - Summer (DST): UTC+02:00 (CEST)
- INSEE/Postal code: 50298 /50500
- ^{1} French Land Register data, which excludes lakes, ponds, glaciers > 1 km^{2} (0.386 sq mi or 247 acres) and river estuaries.

Méautis (French pronunciation: [meoti(s)]) is a commune in the Manche department in Normandy in northwestern France.

== World War II ==
After the liberation of the area by Allied Forces in 1944, engineers of the Ninth Air Force IX Engineering Command began construction of a combat Advanced Landing Ground outside of the town. Declared operational on 17 August, the airfield was designated as "A-17", it was used by the 50th Fighter Group which flew P-47 Thunderbolts until early September when the unit moved into Central France. Afterward, the airfield was closed. On 12 July 1944, General Theodore Roosevelt died in Meautis of a heart attack.

== See also ==
- Communes of the Manche department
