= 50th Operations Group =

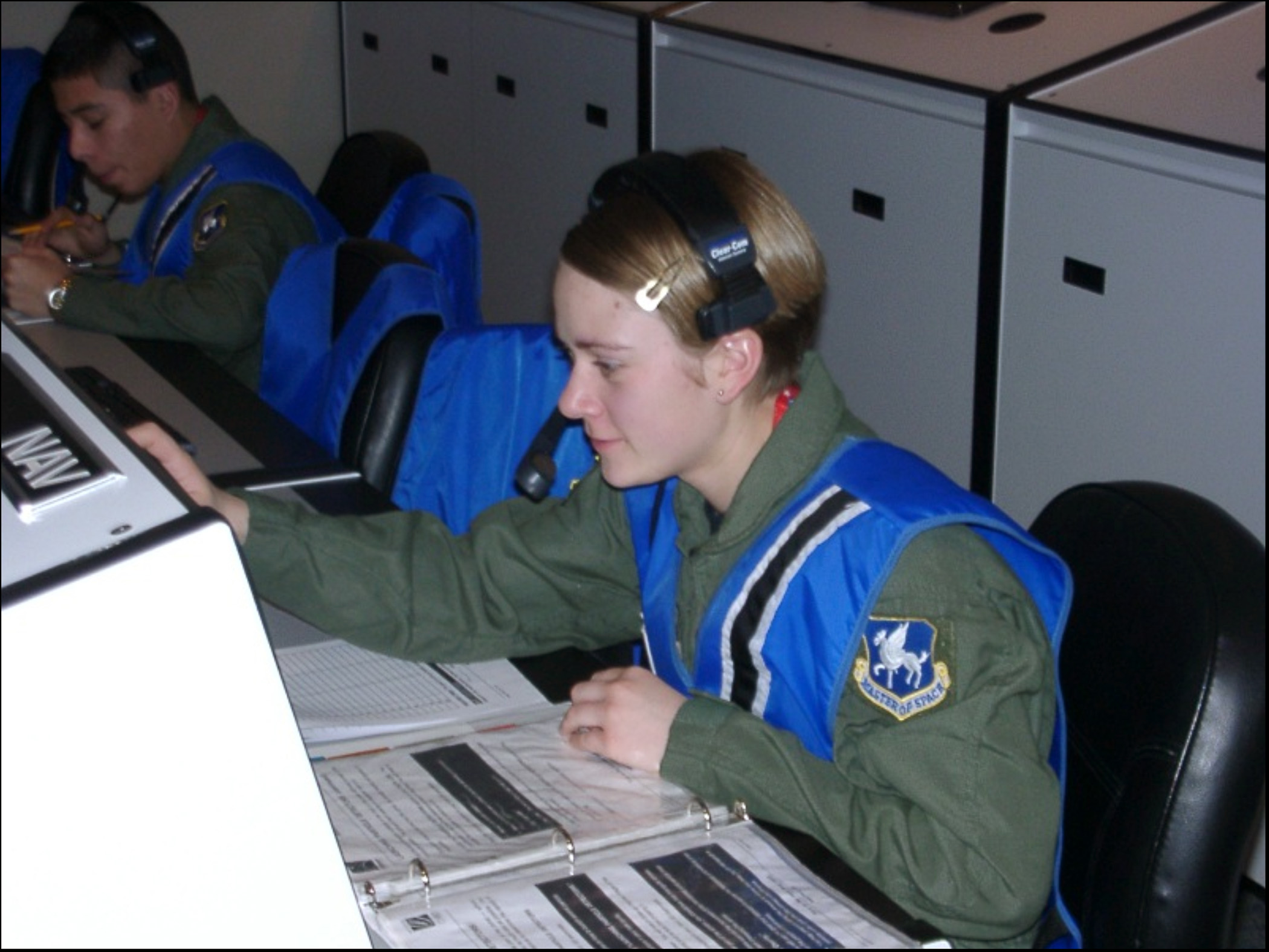
- A 3rd Space Operations Squadron satellite system operator, performs navigation operations
- Active: December 1991–24 July 2020
- Country: United States
- Branch: United States Space Force
- Mottos: Master of the Sky (1941–1957); Master of Space (1992–present)
- Engagements: European Theater of World War II
- Decorations: Distinguished Unit Citation; Air Force Outstanding Unit Award; Cited in the Order of the Day by the Belgian Army

Commanders
- Notable commanders: John E. Shaw

Insignia
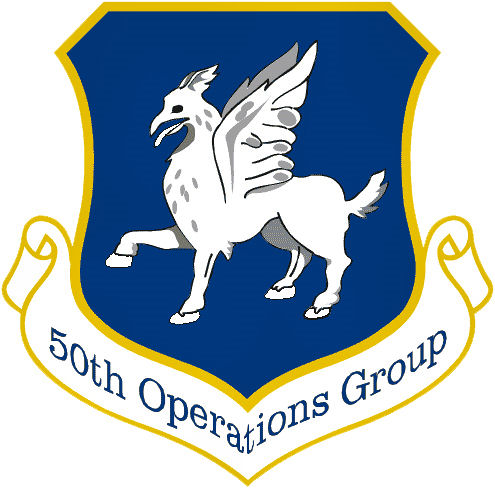
- 50th Operations Group emblem (Note: Originally approved for the group 9 January 1942.) (Note: The group uses the wing emblem with the group designation in the scroll. Robertson, AFHRA Factsheet, 50 Operations Group.)

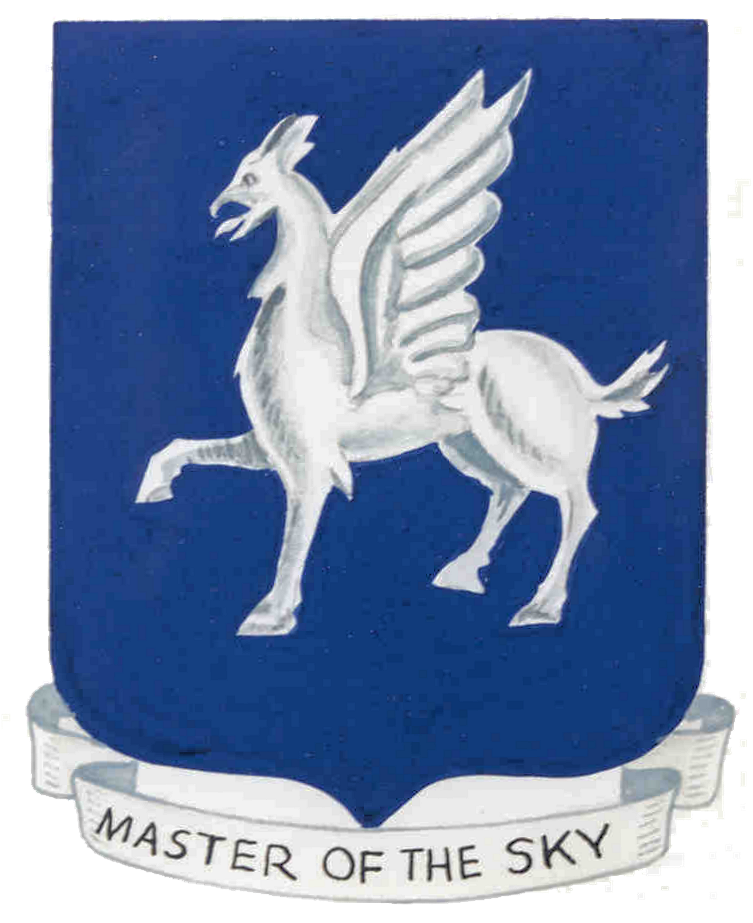
- Original form of the group emblem

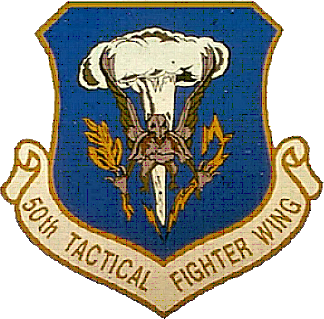
- Group emblem from 23 August 1956 to 8 December 1957 (Note: Emblem approved for the wing. Robertson, AFHRA Factsheet, 50 Space Wing.)

The 50th Operations Group was a subordinate unit of the 50th Space Wing, and assigned to Air Force Space Command from 1991-2019. The group, redesignated as Space Delta 8 on 24 Jul 2020 is stationed at Schriever Space Force Base, previously Schriever Air Force Base, Colorado.

The group was activated in January 1941 as the 50th Pursuit Group and began training under Third Air Force. In May 1942 it was reassigned to the Army Air Forces School of Applied Tactics, where it was a training and test unit as the 50th Fighter Group (Special). The group moved to the European Theater of Operations in the Spring 1944 expansion of Ninth Air Force in England in preparation for Operation Overlord. It few its first combat mission on 1 May 1944. The group moved to France in late June and continued in combat until V-E Day. During combat operations over Western Europe, the unit received two Distinguished Unit Citations. It returned to the United States, where it was inactivated on 7 November 1945.

In June 1949 the group was activated as a reserve unit at Otis Air Force Base, Massachusetts, where it was a corollary unit of the active duty 33d Fighter Group. In 1950, it became the 50th Fighter-Interceptor Group. The group was called to active duty in connection with the Korean War in June 1950, but was inactivated a few days later and its personnel were transferred to other units.

The group, now designated the 50th Fighter-Bomber Group, was activated in January 1953, when it took over the mission, personnel and equipment of the 140th Fighter-Bomber Group, a Colorado Air National Guard unit that had been federalized for the Korean War. Once the group transitioned from North American F-51 Mustangs to North American F-86 Sabres, it deployed to Germany and Hahn Air Base. It moved to Toul-Rosières Air Base, France in 1956, and was inactivated there in late 1957.

Although the group was renamed the 50th Tactical Fighter Group in 1985, it remained inactive until December 1991, when, as the 50th Operations Group, it took over the personnel of the 1002d Operations Group, which was simultaneously inactivated. Since then until 2020, the group managed a variety of surveillance and communications satellites for the Department of Defense. When it was inactivated on 24 July 2020, its squadrons went to Space Delta 8 and Space Delta 9.

== Overview ==
The 50th Operations Group stood up at Falcon Air Force Base 30 January 1992, the same day as its parent, the 50th Space Wing. Its crews, formerly the crews of the 1002d Operations Group, monitored satellites during launch operations, maneuvered them into proper orbits and maintained their health in space.

The group commands, controls and executes launch and early orbit operations, and provides operational support for over 65 satellites which support the president, the Secretary of Defense, other government agencies, and United States and allied military forces. It comprises over 1,100 active duty, reserve, and civilians. It trains the more than 500 system operators that form its space operations crews.

The group's space operations centers track, monitor telemetry and command satellites during launch, early-orbit and on-orbit operations. They resolve anomalies with satellites when they occur and dispose of the satellites when missions are terminated.

== History ==
=== World War II ===
==== Initial training and reinforcement of combat theaters ====
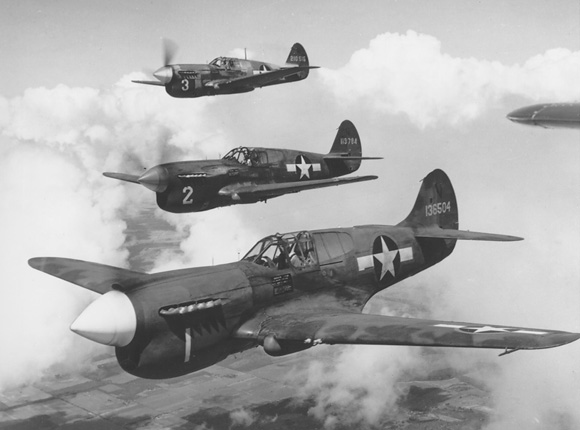
P-40s as flown by the group

The group was first activated as the 50th Pursuit Group at Selfridge Field, Michigan in January 1941. The group initially consisted of the 10th, 11th and 12th Pursuit Squadrons. It trained with Vultee BT-13 Valiant trainers and second-line Seversky P-35 Guardsman fighters at Selfridge. Although stationed in the geographical region of the Northeast Air District, the group was assigned to the 22d Fighter Wing of the Southeast Air District, located at Hunter Field, Georgia. In September, the group moved to the southeast and Key Field, Mississippi, where it equipped with Curtiss P-40 Warhawks.

Shortly after the Japanese attack on Pearl Harbor, the group's 11th Pursuit Squadron was dispatched to Elmendorf Field to reinforce the defenses of Alaska against Japanese attack, departing on 19 December. The urgency of the need for reinforcements in Alaska was so great that the squadron was picked even though its pilots were untrained on the flight conditions they could expect to experience in Alaska. Two weeks elapsed before the planes reached the Sacramento Air Depot at McClellan Field, California for winterization, and at the end of the month when the 11th was reassigned, none of its planes had left McClellan.

No sooner had the 11th been replaced by the newly activated 81st Pursuit Squadron in mid-January 1942, than the 12th was moved to Christmas Island in the South Pacific Theater. The group was brought up to full strength once again in February, when the 313th Pursuit Squadron was activated and assigned. At Key Field, the group mission was initially the transition training of new graduates of advanced flying training schools in fighter aircraft.

==== Training and operational testing ====
While at Key Field, the unit was reassigned to the Army Air Forces School of Applied Tactics's Fighter Command School and became the 50th Fighter Group (Special) as it added the mission of testing new equipment and developing air defense tactics to its training mission.

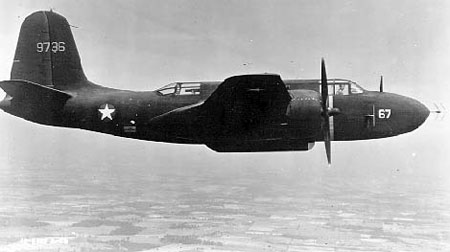
Douglas P-70 in

Night fighter combat over the skies of England made the Army Air Forces aware of the need for night air defense training and tactics development. The Air Defense Operational Training Unit was established on 26 March. A few days later this was renamed the Interceptor Command School, then the Fighter Command School. As part of its mission, the group furnished cadres to new night fighter squadrons and its 81st Fighter Squadron conducted night fighter training in Douglas P-70 Havocs. The 81st was assigned the "daunting task" of training sufficient crews to man seventeen night fighter squadrons within twelve months, initially " [w]ith no trained instructor pilots or radar operators, no aircraft, no radar, and no communications equipment". The original night fighter crews were recruited from 27 pilots from the group who were qualified to fly twin-engine aircraft. They attended transition training school at Williams Field, Arizona before returning to Florida.

By the end of September, the Army Air Forces School of Applied Tactics Night Fighter Department was activated and the 81st Fighter Squadron was detached from the 50th Group and placed under the Department for training and operations. In October 1942, the personnel and equipment of the 81st squadron provided the manpower and equipment for the newly formed 348th and 349th Night Fighter Squadrons, and the squadron was remanned.

In late March 1943, the group moved to Orlando Army Air Base, Florida, where the Army Air Forces School of Applied Tactics was headquartered, although each of its squadrons was stationed at a different field of the school. (Note: The 10th was at Zephyrhills Army Air Field, the 81st at Cross City Army Air Field, the 313th at Keystone Army Air Field and the 445th at Orlando, all in Florida. Saunders, p. 2.) In Florida, the group added a fourth unit, the 445th Fighter Squadron, which was activated at Orlando. The dispersed squadrons of the group often operated from unprepared airfields, testing the logistics needed to keep aircraft operating in a theater of operations.

In January 1944, the group's squadrons returned to Orlando as the group began to prepare for its own deployment overseas. The group assumed the look of a typical three squadron fighter group in February when the 445th Squadron moved to Muroc Army Air Field, where it would become a Bell P-59 Airacomet jet fighter squadron, and the 50th Fighter Control Squadron was separated from the group and moved to the European Theater of Operations. The group continued to teach during its preparations, using Republic P-47 Thunderbolts and North American P-51 Mustangs. Simultaneously, the night fighter training program was transferred to Hammer Field, California.

==== European Theater of Operations ====
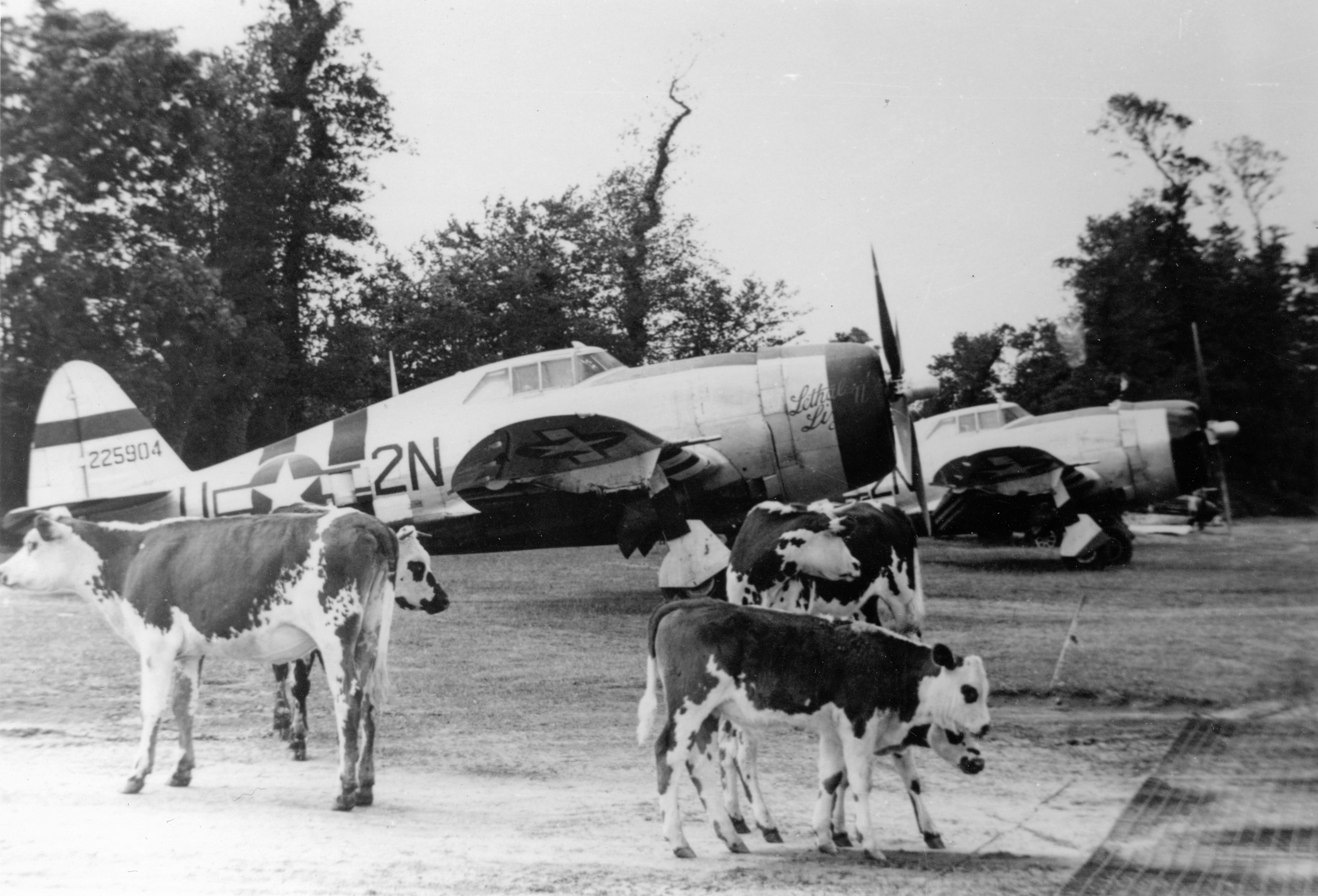
81st Fighter Squadron P-47D at Carentan Airfield (A-10), France, Summer 1944. (Note: Aircraft is P-47D Thunderbolt 42-25904.)

The group departed for the European theater in the middle of March 1944, leaving its Mustangs behind and arriving at its first overseas station, RAF Lymington, in early April 1944 with only Thunderbolts. At Lymington the group became part of IX Air Support Command and its squadrons were assigned fuselage codes T5 (10th), 2N (81st) and W3 (313th). Lymington was a temporary airfield and a prototype for the type of temporary advanced landing grounds which would be built in France after D-Day, when the need for advanced landing fields would become urgent as the Allied forces moved east across France and Germany. Tents were used for billeting and also for support facilities; an access road was built to the existing road infrastructure; a dump for supplies, ammunition, and gasoline drums, along with a drinkable water and minimal electrical grid for communications and station lighting.

The group began operations by making a fighter sweep over France on 1 May. It engaged primarily in escort and dive-bombing missions for the next month. The 50th covered the invasion beaches during Operation Overlord, the invasion of Normandy on 6 and 7 June, and moved to its first Advanced Landing Ground at Carentan, France on 25 June.

Once established on the continent, the 50th attacked bridges, roads, vehicles, railways, trains, gun emplacements, and marshalling yards during the Normandy campaign. It bombed targets in the Saint-Lô region in July and supported the subsequent drive across France. The allied drive was so rapid that in September the group moved over 230 miles from Meautis Airfield in Normandy to Orly Airport, near Paris. It spent only ten days near the City of Lights, however and by the end of the month was at Lyon-Bron Airport, where it was reassigned to XII Tactical Air Command, which had moved from the Mediterranean Theater of Operations following Operation Dragoon, the invasion of southern France. The group assisted in stemming the German offensive in the Saar-Hardt area early in January 1945. The 50th engaged in the offensive that reduced the Colmar Pocket in January and February and supported the drive that breached the Siegfried Line and resulted in the movement of Allied forces into southern Germany in March and April.

In early 1945, the group participated in Operation Clarion, attempting to cut as many rail lines as possible, operating primarily in the area near Strasbourg. The 50th Fighter Group received a Distinguished Unit Citation for close cooperation with Seventh Army in March 1945 during the assault on the Siegfried Line. Despite the hazards of enemy opposition and difficult weather conditions, the group struck enemy defenses and isolated battle areas by destroying bridges, communications, supply areas, and ammunition dumps. The 50th received a second Distinguished Unit Citation for a mission on 25 April 1945 when, despite intense flak the group destroyed or damaged many enemy aircraft on an airfield southeast of Munich.

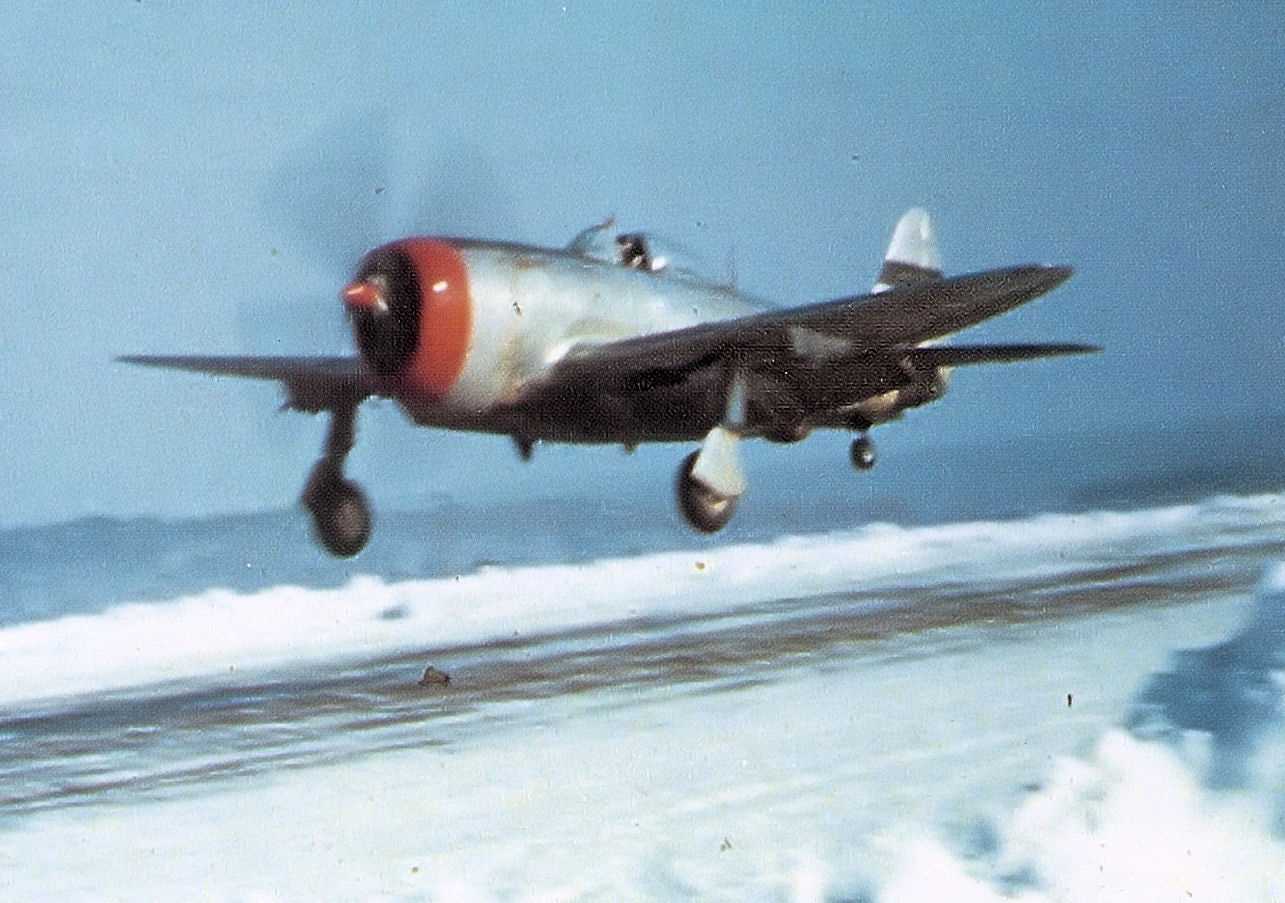
313th Fighter Squadron P-47 Thunderbolt landing at Toul/Ochey Airfield (Note: December 1944. The red nose was the Mediterranean Theater of Operations recognition marking for aircraft of the 1st Tactical Air Force, to which the 50th was assigned during the last seven months of the European Campaign.)

50th Fighter Group

Aerial Victories	Number	Note
Group Hq	0
10th Fighter Squadron	11
81st Fighter Squadron	26
313th Fighter Squadron	14
Group Total	51

The group ended operations at AAF Station Giebelstadt, Germany in May 1945, and returned to the United States in August. it was assigned to Second Air Force at La Junta Army Air Field, Colorado, where it was inactivated on 7 November 1945.

=== Air Force Reserve ===
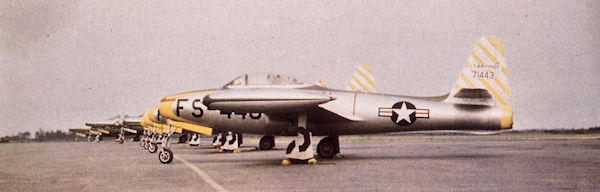
33d Fighter Group F-84Cs at Otis AFB

The May 1949 Air Force Reserve program called for a new type of unit, the Corollary unit, which was a reserve unit integrated with an active duty unit. It was viewed as the best method to train reservists by mixing them with an existing regular unit to perform duties alongside the regular unit. As this plan was implemented, the 50th Fighter Group was reactivated on 1 June 1949, with the 81st Fighter Squadron as its only component. The group was formed at Otis Air Force Base, Massachusetts, and was assigned to the newly activated 50th Fighter Wing under the Wing Base organization plan. The group was the corollary of the 33d Fighter Group of First Air Force. It was originally equipped with the F-51 Mustang which, as the P-51, had formed part of the group's equipment prior to 1944.

In January 1950, the group was redesignated 50th Fighter-Interceptor Group. Training activity included participating in portions of the 33rd Group's air defense missions and exercises. During the year, the group flew a mixture of North American T-6 Texans, Lockheed T-33 T-Birds, Republic F-84 Thunderjets and North American F-86 Sabres. The group was ordered to active service on 1 June 1951 due to the Korean War, and its personnel and equipment were reassigned as replacements to active duty units and the 50th group was inactivated the next day.

=== Reactivation in the Regular Air Force ===
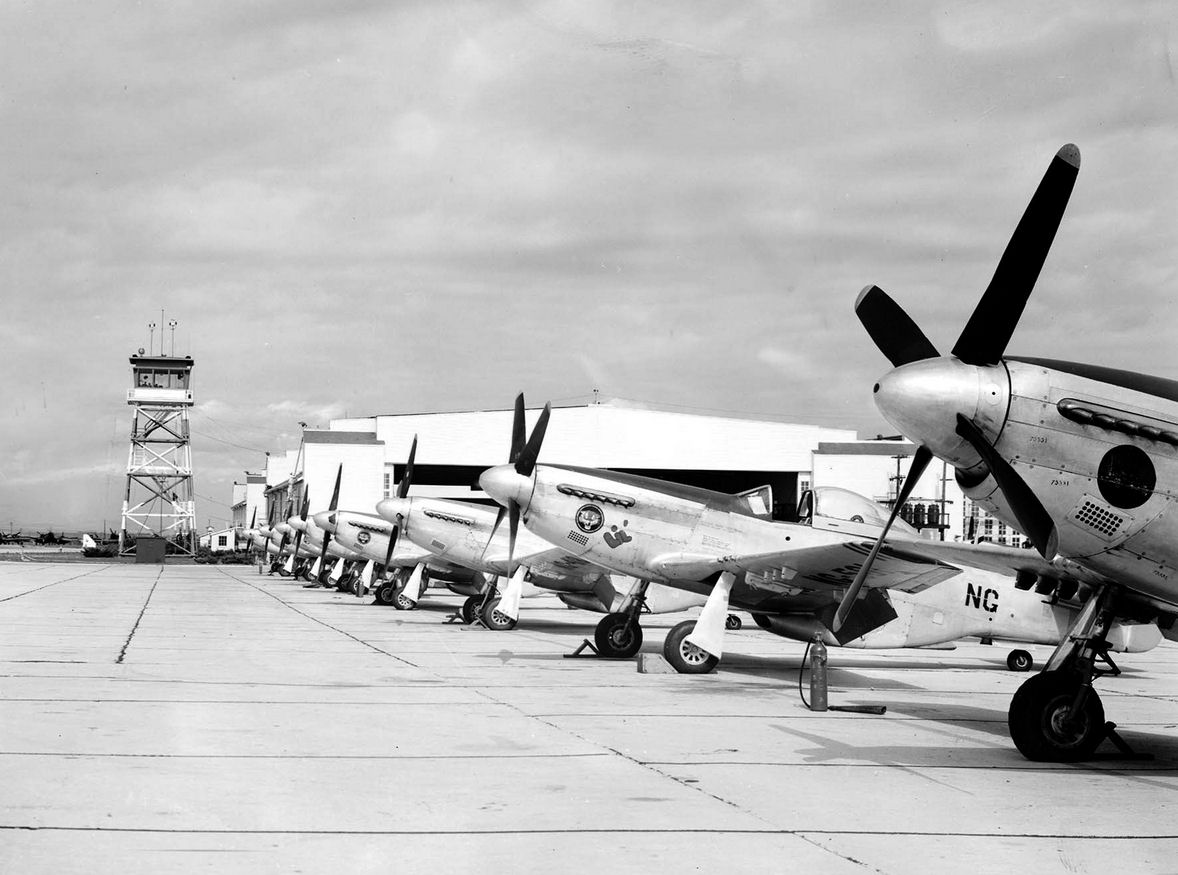
F-51 Mustangs of the 140th Fighter-Bomber Group

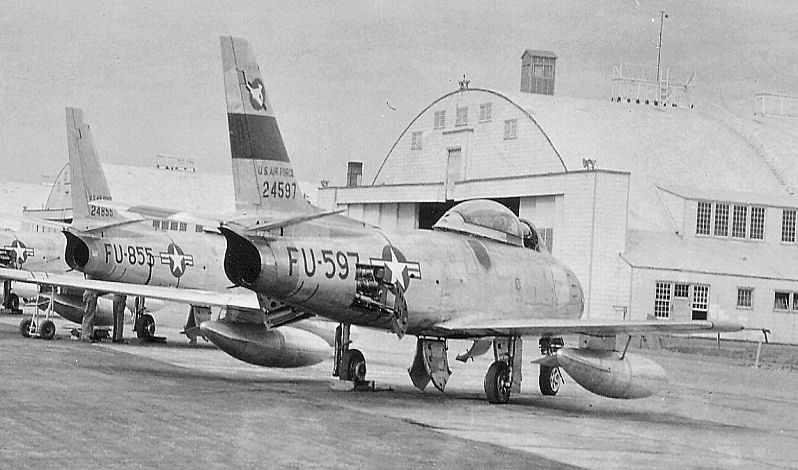
417th Fighter-Bomber Squadron Sabres at Clovis AFB

On 1 January 1953, the group became the 50th Fighter-Bomber Group and was reactivated as part of Tactical Air Command at Clovis Air Force Base, New Mexico. The 10th, 81st and 417th Fighter-Bomber Squadrons were assigned to the group. (Note: Although the 417th was not one of the 50th's original units, the squadron had been stationed with the group at AAF Giebelstadt, Germany, during the final days of World War II.) For the third time, the group was equipped with the F-51 Mustang. These fighters along with their pilots, support personnel and other equipment were taken over from the 140th Fighter-Bomber Group of the Colorado Air National Guard, which was simultaneously released from active duty and returned to state control. (Note: The 50th's squadrons similarly replaced squadrons of the Colorado, Utah and Wyoming Air National Guard.)

The 140th had been training with Mustangs at Clovis for little over a year, but before long, the group replaced its Mustangs with jet-powered F-86F Sabres. The conversion to the Sabre continued through the spring and early summer of 1953, as crews and maintenance personnel became familiar the Sabre. Once training levels for pilots and ground crews had reached operational levels, the 50th began preparations for its move to Europe.

The 50th deployed to Hahn on 10 August 1953, in a movement titled Operation Fox Able 20. The ground echelon of the wing sailed from Galveston, Texas, to Bremerhaven, West Germany aboard the USS General M. B. Stewart (AP-140). It traveled by rail to its new home at Hahn, arriving in August 1953.

=== United States Air Forces in Europe ===
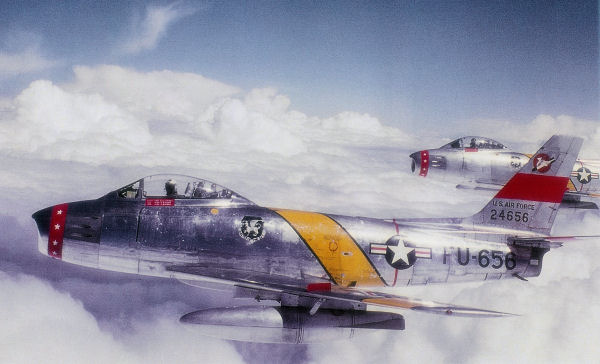
417th Fighter-Bomber Squadron F-86F Sabres over Germany (Note: Aircraft are F-86F-30-NA Sabres. Serial 52-4656 leading.)

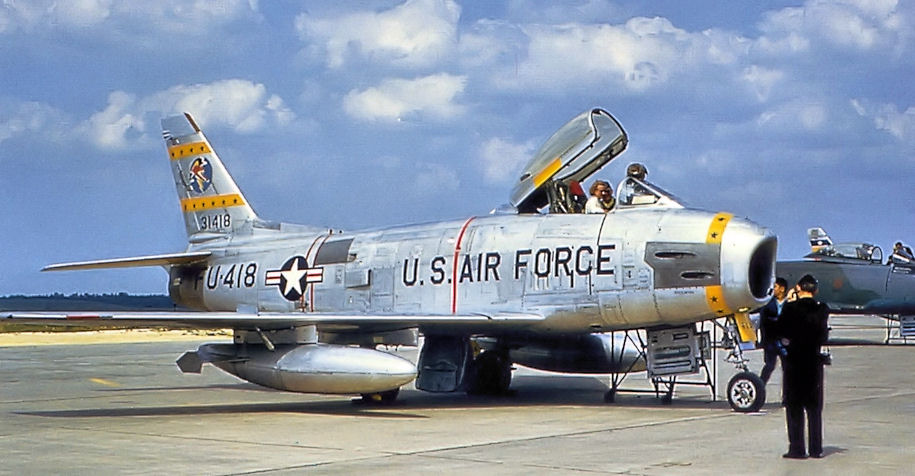
81st Fighter-Bomber Squadron F-86H (Note: Aircraft is North American F-86H-10-NH Sabre Serial 53-1418)

The original construction of Hahn Air Base had begun in 1951 by the French Forces of Occupation in Germany. Hahn was located in the French Zone of Occupation, but negotiations between the French and Americans had allowed for the stationing of American troops in the French Zone. Construction was completed by the Americans and by May 1953, Hahn was ready to receive a fighter wing.

On Arriving at Hahn, the group participated in Exercise Monte Carlo, a staged combat employment drill to illustrate the capability of North Atlantic Treaty Organization air defense forces. During the brief operation, unit aircrews flew 124 simulated combat sorties, including 52 in one 4-hour period. United States Air Forces Europe (USAFE) initiated a training program in 1954 in which its units deployed to Wheelus Field, Libya, where better weather permitted more flying hours. 50th pilots spent six weeks at the Wheelus range near Tripoli to improve their air-to-air combat and ground attack skills. The F-86F crews of 50th scored higher in both the air-to-air and the air-to-ground events than any other unit assigned to Twelfth Air Force.

By 1955, USAFE began an annual, command-wide aerial gunnery competition at the Wheelus ranges. During the first such event, held 30 July 1955, the pilots of 50th Group took top honors in the command. Three months later the group began modernizing its Sabre fleet. The first F-86H Sabre arrived at Hahn on 21 October 1955. Conversion continued throughout the winter of 1955 and spring of 1956, ending in May.

New aircraft would not be the only change for the personnel of the 50th, however. With the conversion to the newer F-86H nearly complete, the 50th Fighter-Bomber Wing began a move to Toul-Rosières Air Base, France. The 50th Group's 417th Fighter-Bomber Squadron was the first squadron to relocate, moving to France on 15 April 1956.. The group and the 10th and 81st Squadrons joined the 417th in mid-July. The group was mission-ready at Toul by 1 August. Almost immediately, USAFE chose the 50th to represent the command at the Air Force Fighter Weapons Meet at Nellis Air Force Base, Nevada. The group's team was led by the commander of the 417th, Lt. Col. Chuck Yeager.

The group continued training and participating in various air defense exercises until 8 December 1957, when the group's squadrons, were reassigned directly to the 50th Fighter-Bomber Wing, which converted to the dual deputy organization model, with a deputy wing commander for operations and staff replacing the group headquarters.

=== Satellite operations ===
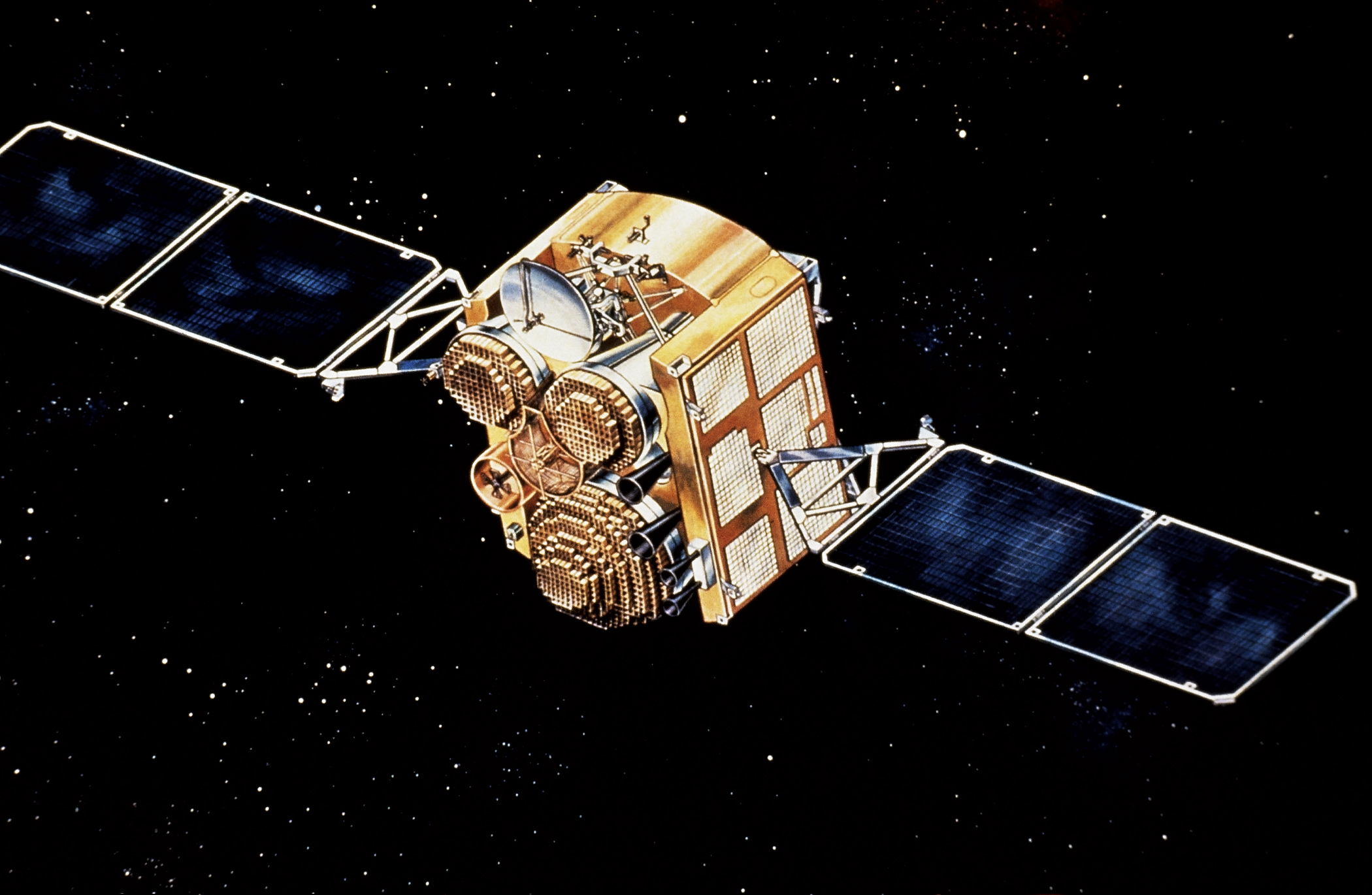
Defense Space Communications System-3 satellite

The group activated at Falcon Air Force Base on 30 January 1992, when it assumed the personnel of the 1002d Operations Group, which was simultaneously inactivated. The 1st, 2d and 3d Satellite Control Squadrons were redesignated Space Operations Squadrons and assigned to the group from the 2d Space Wing as that wing inactivated. A few months later, the 4th Space Operations Squadron was activated in April to operate the Milstar satellite system and in July, the 1000th Satellite Operations Group at Offutt Air Force Base, Nebraska, which had operated the Defense Meteorological Satellite Program since 1963 was reduced to squadron strength and assigned to the group as the 6th Space Operations Squadron. Later that year, in November, the group's 3d Space Operations Squadron was called on to relocate a Defense Satellite Communications System craft from European orbit in order to provide coverage for Operation Restore Hope, the United Nations supervised operation to provide security for humanitarian efforts in Somalia.

The group continued to add squadrons as it accepted responsibility for more satellite systems. In November 1993, the group added a sixth squadron when the 5th Space Operations Squadron was activated at Onizuka Air Force Base and assigned to the group. The squadron was responsible for the Defense Satellite Communications II and NATO IV communications satellite systems. These older systems were transferred to the 5th from the 3d Space Operations Squadron so that the 3d could concentrate on newer systems. With the obsolescence of the two systems, the remaining Defense Satellite Communications System II was transferred to a commercial company and the 5th was inactivated in June 2000.

On 30 September 1998 the group's 6th Space Operations Squadron was inactivated at Offutt as the Defense Meteorological Satellite Program (DMSP) was transferred to the National Oceanic and Atmospheric Administration. It was activated the next day in the Air Force Reserve to serve as a backup for the DMSP mission.

In June 1999, the 750th Space Group at Onizuka Air Station, California was inactivated as some of its activities were transferred to Schreiver Air Force Base. Its three squadrons, the 21st, 22d, and 23d Space Operations Squadrons were assigned to the group. In a realignment of the 50th Space Wing in March 2004, they were transferred to the 50th Network Operations Group.

During the War in Iraq the group's squadrons provided surveillance and communications support for coalition forces and devised improvements for the GPS system to improve targeting accuracy in the theater.

== Lineage ==
- Constituted as the 50th Pursuit Group (Interceptor) on 20 November 1940

Activated on 15 January 1941
Redesignated: 50th Fighter Group on 15 May 1942
Redesignated: 50th Fighter Group (Special) on 28 May 1942
Redesignated: 50th Fighter Group (Single Engine) on 21 January 1944
Inactivated on 7 November 1945

- Activated in the Reserve on 1 June 1949

Redesignated 50th Fighter-Interceptor Group on 1 May 1950
Ordered to active service on 1 June 1951
Inactivated on 2 June 1951

- Redesignated 50th Fighter-Bomber Group on 15 November 1952

Activated on 1 January 1953
Inactivated on 8 December 1957

- Redesignated: 50th Tactical Fighter Group on 31 July 1985 (remained inactive)

Redesignated: 50th Operations Group on 1 January 1992
Activated on 30 January 1992

=== Assignments ===
- Southeast Air District, 15 January 1941
- 22d Pursuit Wing, c. January 1941
- III Interceptor Command, 2 October 1941
- Fighter Command School (an activity), 28 May 1942
- Fighter Command School (formerly, 5th Interceptor Command), 25 August 1942
- Army Air Forces School of Applied Tactics (later Army Air Forces Tactical Center), 22 January 1943
- IX Air Support Command (later IX Tactical Air Command), 4 April 1944 (attached to 84th Fighter Wing for operations after 7 April 1944)
- XII Tactical Air Command, 29 September 1944 (attached to 64th Fighter Wing for operations until June 1945)
- Second Air Force, 4 August – 7 November 1945
- 50th Fighter Wing (later 50th Fighter-Interceptor Wing), 1 June 1949 – 2 January 1951
- 50th Fighter-Bomber Wing, 1 January 1953 – 8 December 1957
- 50th Space Wing, 30 January 1992 – present

=== Components ===
Space Operations Squadrons

- 1st Space Operations Squadron: 30 January 1992 – 2020
- 2d Space Operations Squadron: 30 January 1992 – 2020
- 3d Space Operations Squadron: 30 January 1992 – 2020
- 4th Space Operations Squadron: 30 April 1992 – 2020
- 5th Space Operations Squadron: 22 November 1993 – 13 June 2000

Onizuka Air Force Base, California

- 6th Space Operations Squadron: 31 July 1992 – 30 September 1998

Offutt Air Force Base, Nebraska

- 21st Space Operations Squadron: 7 June 1999 – 10 March 2004

Onizuka Air Force Base (later Onizuka Air Station), California

- 22d Space Operations Squadron: 2 June 1999 – 10 March 2004
- 23d Space Operations Squadron: 3 June 1999 – 10 March 2004

New Boston Air Force Station, New Hampshire

Fighter Squadrons

- 10th Pursuit Squadron (later 10th Fighter, Squadron, 10th Fighter-Bomber Squadron): 15 January 1941 – 7 November 1945; 1 January 1953 – 3 December 1957
- 11th Pursuit Squadron: 15 January – 30 December 1941
- 12th Pursuit Squadron (later 12th Fighter Squadron): 15 January 1941 – 18 August 1942
- 81st Pursuit Squadron (later 81st Fighter Squadron, 81st Fighter-Interceptor Squadron, 81st Fighter-Bomber Squadron): 15 January 1941 – 7 November 1945; 20 June 1949 – 2 June 1951; 1 January 1953 – 8 December 1957
- 313th Pursuit Squadron (later 313th Fighter Squadron): 9 February 1942 – 7 November 1945
- 417th Fighter-Bomber Squadron: 1 January 1953 – 8 December 1957
- 445th Fighter Squadron: 24 February 1943 – 10 February 1944

Support Squadrons

- 50th Interceptor Control Squadron (later 50th Fighter Control Squadron), c. January 1942 – 10 February 1944
- 50th Operations Support Squadron, 30 January 1992 – 2020

=== Stations ===
- Selfridge Field, Michigan, 15 January 1941
- Key Field, Mississippi, 3 October 1941
- Orlando Army Air Base, Florida, 22 March 1943
- Alachua Army Air Field, Florida, 20 November 1943
- Orlando Army Air Base, Florida, 1 February – 13 March 1944
- RAF Lymington (AAF-551), England, 5 April 1944
- Carentan Airfield (A-10), France, 25 June 1944
- Meautis Airfield (A-17), France, 16 August 1944
- Orly Airport (A-47), France, 4 September 1944
- Laon/Couvron Airfield (A-70), France, 15 September 1944
- Lyon-Bron Airport (Y-6), France, 28 September 1944
- Toul/Ochey Airfield (A-96), France, 3 November 1944
- AAF Station Giebelstadt (Y-90), Germany, 20 April 1945
- AAF Station Mannheim/Sandhofen, Germany, 21 May–June 1945
- La Junta Army Air Field, Colorado, 4 August – 7 November 1945
- Otis Air Force Base, Massachusetts, 1 June 1949 – 2 June 1951
- Clovis Air Force Base, New Mexico, 1 January – 23 July 1953
- Hahn Air Base, Germany, 10 August 1953
- Toul-Rosières Air Base, France, 17 July 1956 – 8 December 1957
- Falcon Air Force Base (later Schriever Air Force Base), Colorado, 1 January 1992 – present

=== Awards and campaigns ===
Award streamer	Award	Dates	Notes
	Distinguished Unit Citation	13 March 1945 – 20 March 1945	50th Fighter Group, European Theater
	Distinguished Unit Citation	25 April 1945	50th Fighter Group, Germany
	Air Force Outstanding Unit Award	1 October 1998 – 30 September 2000	50th Operations Group
	Air Force Outstanding Unit Award	1 October 2000 – 1 October 2001	50th Operations Group
	Air Force Outstanding Unit Award	1 October 2001 – 1 October 2002	50th Operations Group
	Air Force Outstanding Unit Award	2 October 2002 – 2 October 2003	50th Operations Group
	Air Force Outstanding Unit Award	1 October 2007 – 30 September 2009	50th Operations Group
	Cited in the Order of the Day, Belgian Army	6 June 1944 – 30 September 1944	50th Fighter Group

Campaign/Service Streamer	Campaign	Dates	Notes
	American Theater without inscription	7 December 1941 – 13 March 1944	50th Fighter Group
	Air Offensive, Europe	5 April 1944 – 5 June 1944	50th Fighter Group
	Normandy	6 June 1944 – 24 July 1944	50th Fighter Group
	Northern France	25 July 1944 – 14 September 1944	50th Fighter Group
	Rhineland	15 September 1944 – 21 March 1945	50th Fighter Group
	Ardennes-Alsace	16 December 1944 – 25 January 1945	50th Fighter Group
	Central Europe	22 March 1944 – 21 May 1945	50th Fighter Group

=== Aircraft ===
- Vultee BT-13 Valiant, 1941–1942
- Seversky P-35 Guardsman, 1941–1942
- Curtiss P-36 Hawk, 1941
- Bell P-39 Airacobra, 1941
- Curtiss P-40 Warhawk, 1942–1943
- Republic P-47 Thunderbolt, 1943–1945
- North American P-51 Mustang, 1943–1944, 1951
- Douglas P-70 Havoc, 1942–1943
- North American F-86 Sabre, 1953–1957 (Note: In addition to the listed aircraft, the group's 445th Squadron operated at least 16 different types of planes in 1943 and 1944 in performing its operational test mission. Maurer, Combat Squadrons, p. 551; Saunders, p. 2.)>

== List of commanders ==
- Col Marvin G. Matthews, 30 January 1992 – 22 February 1993;
- Col Gregory L. Gilles, 22 February 1993 – 16 June 1993
- Col William L. Shelton, 16 June 1993 – 14 July 1994
- Col Rodney P. Liesveld, 14 July 1994 – 17 May 1996
- Col Joseph Wysocki, 17 May 1996 – 3 June 1998
- Col Robert M. Worley II, 3 June 1998 – 16 June 2000
- Col Diann Latham, 16 June 2000 – 1 July 2002
- Col David W. Ziegler, 1 July 2002 – 21 June 2004
- Col J. Kevin McLaughlin, 21 June 2004 – 9 June 2006
- Col Clinton E. Crosier, 9 June 2006 – 15 July 2008
- Col Stanford K. Kekauoha, 15 July 2008 – 1 July 2010
- Col John E. Shaw, 1 July 2010 – 1 July 2010
- Col Tommy A. Roberts, 10 July 2012 – July 2014
- Col Dennis Bythewood, July 2014 – 27 June 2016
- Col Toby Doran, 27 June 2016 – 15 June 2018
- Col Laurel Walsh, 15 June 2018 – 16 June 2020
- Col Matthew E. Holston, 16 June 2020 – 24 July 2020

== See also ==
- List of United States Air Force Groups
- List of F-86 Sabre units
