= Wings of Dreams =

Defunct aviation museum in Starke

- Location in Florida
- Location: Starke, Florida
- Coordinates: 29.839723°N 82.044675°W
- Type: Aviation museum
- Website: www.wingsofdreams.org/

Wings of Dreams was an aviation museum located at the Keystone Heights Airport in Starke, Florida. The museum features exhibits on the airport's role as Keystone Army Air Field and training of pilots in preparation for the Normandy Invasion during World War II. It also features exhibits on Women Airforce Service Pilots and the space program in the United States. The museum is scheduled to receive one of the training simulators used in the space shuttle program at its completion.

In January 2019, the museum was reportedly facing a shutdown due to a lack of funds and a pending eviction from the airport.
