= 84th Fighter Wing (World War II) =

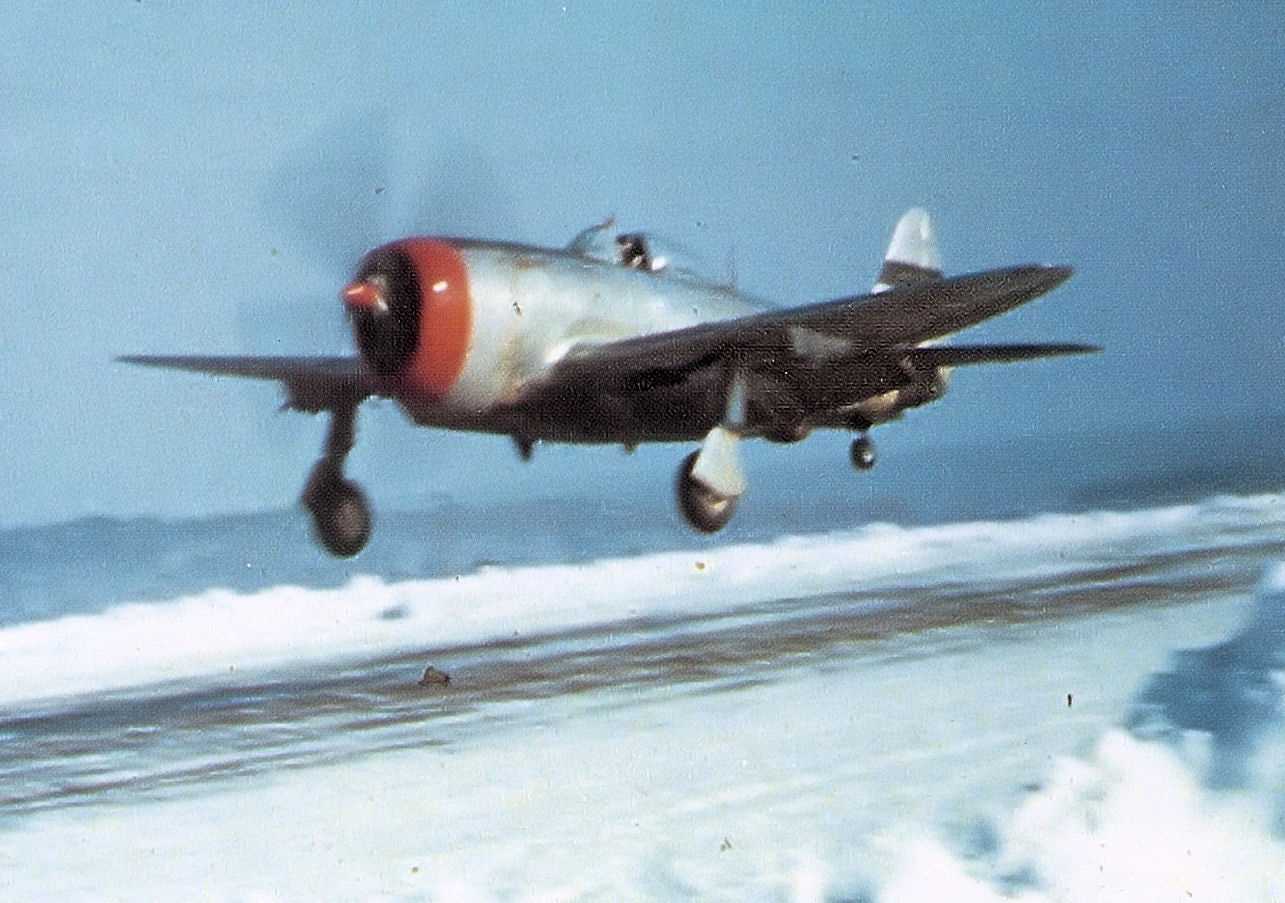
- 50th Fighter Group P-47 Thunderbolt landing at Toul/Ochey Airfield (A-96), southwest of Nancy, France in December 1944.
- Active: 1943–1945
- Country: United States
- Branch: United States Army Air Forces
- Role: Fighter Command and Control

The 84th Fighter Wing is an inactive United States Air Force unit. Its last assignment was with the IX Tactical Air Command, based at Brunswick, Germany. It was inactivated on 12 August 1945.

== History ==
Established and organized at Blumenthal Field, North Carolina in 1943 as a command and control organization. Deployed to the European Theater of Operations (ETO) in early 1944 and assigned to IX Fighter Command, Ninth Air Force. Initial Mission of the Wing was to receive operational orders from Headquarters, IX Fighter Command and direct subordinate groups in attacking enemy targets in Occupied France and the Low Countries in preparation for the Normandy Invasion in June 1944. Targets included bridges, roads, railroads and enemy interceptor aircraft both on the ground as well as in air-to-air combat.

After the D-Day invasion, was reassigned to IX Tactical Air Command (IX TAC) and directed to provide ground support for advancing United States First Army forces in France, attacking enemy targets initially in the Cotentin Peninsula, then supported Operation Cobra, the breakout of Normandy and attacked enemy forces in the Falaise-Argentan Gap. Wing headquarters and subordinate units operated primarily from liberated airfields and newly built temporary Advanced Landing Grounds in France, moved into north-central France, its groups attacking enemy targets near Paris then north-west into Belgium and the southern Netherlands. In December 1944/January 1945, engaged enemy targets on the north side of the Battle of the Bulge, then moved eastward into the Northern Rhineland as part of the Western Allied invasion of Germany.

Supported First Army as it crossed the Rhine River at Remagen then moved north to attack ground targets in the Ruhr, providing air support as Allied ground forces encircled enemy forces in the Ruhr Pocket, essentially ending organized enemy resistance in Western Germany. First Army halted its advance at the Elbe River in late April 1945, the wing engaging targets of opportunity in enemy-controlled areas until combat was ended on 5 May 1945.

Remained in Europe after the war as part of United States Air Forces in Europe, performing occupation duty and the destruction or shipment to the United States of captured enemy combat equipment. Personnel demobilized and was inactivated in Germany in August 1945.

=== Operations and decorations ===
- Combat Operations: Combat in European Theater of Operations (ETO), 29 January 1944-May 1945.
- Campaigns: Air Offensive, Europe; Normandy; Northern France; Rhineland; Ardennes-Alsace; Central Europe
- Decorations: Cited in the Order of the Day, Belgian Army: 6 Jun-30 Sep 1944; 1 Oct 1944-; Dec 1944-Jan 1945. Belgian Fourragere.

=== Lineage ===
- Constituted as 84th Fighter Wing on 4 November 1943

Activated on 10 November 1943
Disbanded on 12 August 1945.

=== Assignments ===
- Third Air Force, 10 November 1943 – 29 January 1944
- IX Fighter Command, 29 January – 30 April 1944
- IX Tactical Air Command, 30 April 1944 – 12 August 1945

=== Components ===
Attached to IX Tactical Air Command entire time

- 50th Fighter Group: (P-47 Thunderbolt), 7 April-12 August 1944
- 365th Fighter Group: (P-47 Thunderbolt), 1 August-1 October 1944
- 404th Fighter Group: (P-47 Thunderbolt), 1 August-26 October 1944

=== Stations ===
- Bluethenthal Field, North Carolina, 10 November 1943 – 1 January 1944
- RAF Keevil (AAF-471), England, 29 January 1944
- RAF Beaulieu (AAF-408), England, 4 March 1944
- Houesville, France, 19 June 1944
- Cricqueville Airfield (A-2), France, 2 August 1944
- Aillières-Beauvoir, France, 30 August 1944
- Saint-Quentin, France, 12 September 1944
- Vermand, France, 17 September 1944
- Arlon, Belgium, 1 October 1944
- Maastricht Airfield (Y-44), Netherlands, 22 October 1944
- Munchen-Gladbach Airfield (Y-56), Germany, 8 March 1945
- Haltern, Germany, 3 April 1945
- Gutersloh Airfield (Y-99), Germany, 14 April 1945
- Brunswick/Broitzem Airfield (R-38), Germany, 22 April – 12 August 1945
