= Meautis Airfield =

Meautis Airfield Advanced Landing Ground (ALG) A-17

- Basse-Normandie Region, France Meautis Airfield (France)

Site information
- Type: Military airfield
- Controlled by: United States Army Air Forces

Location
- Coordinates: 49°17′07″N 001°18′16″W

Site history
- Built by: IX Engineering Command
- In use: August–September 1944
- Materials: Prefabricated Hessian Surfacing (PHS)
- Battles/wars: Western Front (World War II); Northern France Campaign

Meautis Airfield is an abandoned World War II military airfield, which is located near the commune of Méautis in the Normandy region of northern France.

Located to the east of Méautis, the United States Army Air Force established a temporary airfield on 24 July 1944, shortly after the Allied landings in France The airfield was constructed by the IX Engineering Command, 840th Engineer Aviation Battalion.

== History ==
Known as Advanced Landing Ground "A-17", the airfield consisted of a single 5000' (1500m) Prefabricated Hessian Surfacing/Compressed Earth runway (3600 PHS/1400 ETH) aligned 10/28.

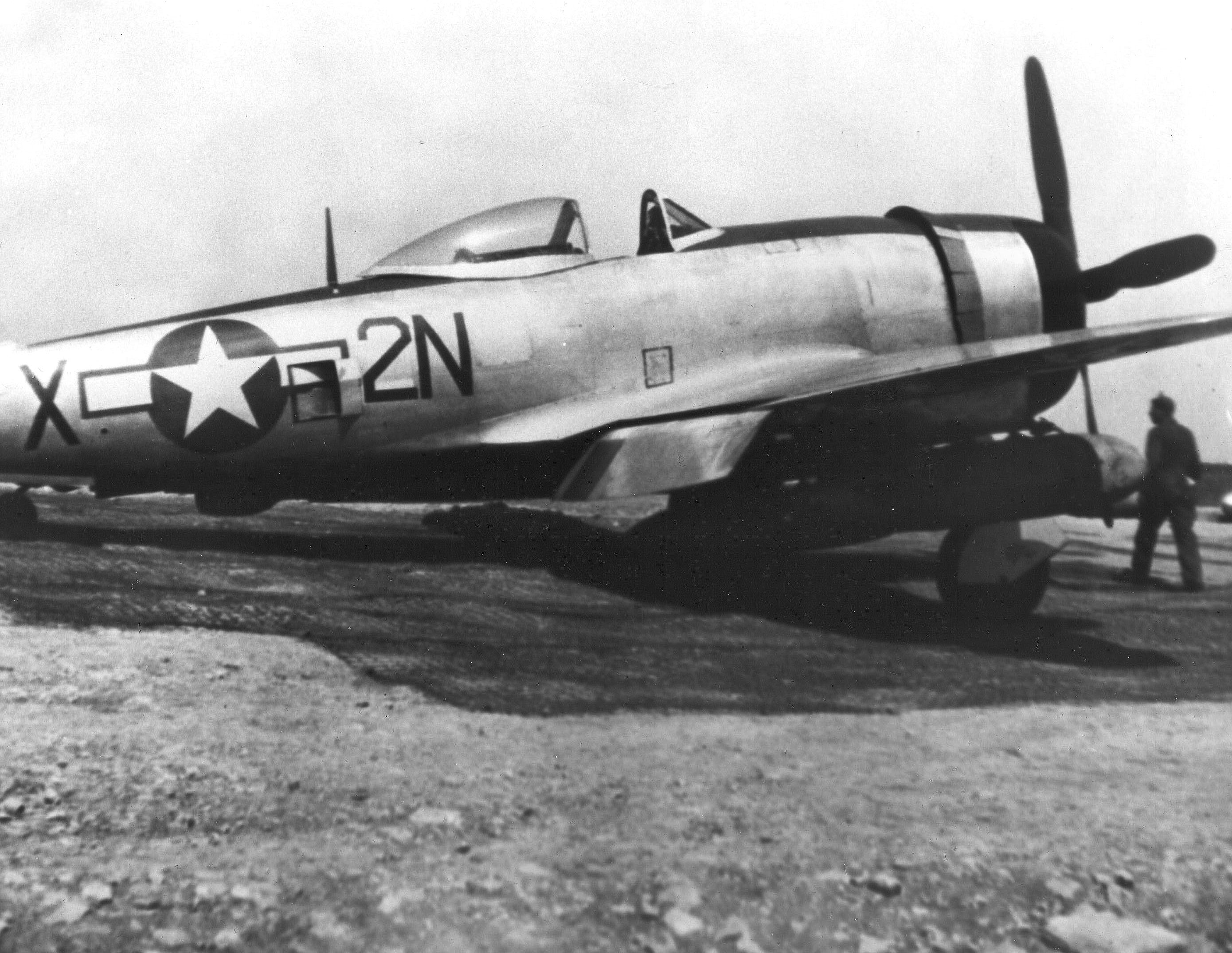
81st Fighter Squadron - P-47 Thunderbolt, Meautis Airfield (A-17), France.

In addition, tents were used for billeting and also for support facilities; an access road was built to the existing road infrastructure; a dump for supplies, ammunition, and gasoline drums, along with a drinkable water and minimal electrical grid for communications and station lighting.

The 50th Fighter Group, based P-47 Thunderbolt fighters at Meautis from 15 August though 6 September 1944.

The fighter planes flew support missions during the Allied invasion of Normandy, patrolling roads in front of the beachhead; strafing German military vehicles and dropping bombs on gun emplacements, anti-aircraft artillery and concentrations of German troops in Normandy and Brittany when spotted.

After the Americans moved east into Central France with the advancing Allied Armies, the airfield was closed on 7 September 1944. Today the airfield consists of agricultural fields, likely located to the east of the commune, as a large section of land appears to have an outline of an airfield by its field shapes.
