= Lyon–Bron Airport =

Minor airport serving Lyon, France

Lyon–Bron Airport Aéroport de Lyon-Bron Advanced Landing Ground (ALG) Y-6
- IATA: LYN; ICAO: LFLY

Summary
- Airport type: Public
- Operator: Aéroports de Lyon SA
- Serves: Lyon, France
- Location: Bron, France
- Elevation AMSL: 659 ft / 201 m
- Coordinates: 45°43′46″N 004°56′20″E
- Website: lyonaeroports.com

Map

Runways
Direction	Length		Surface
Direction	m	ft	Surface
16/34	1,820	5,971	Paved
- Source: French AIP

Lyon–Bron Airport (French: Aéroport de Lyon-Bron; IATA: LYN, ICAO: LFLY) is an airport located in Bron, 10 kilometres (6 mi) east of Lyon, both communes of the Metropolis of Lyon in the Auvergne-Rhône-Alpes region in Eastern France. Lyon–Bron is one of two airports serving the city, alongside the larger and more recent Lyon–Saint-Exupéry Airport.

== History ==
The airport was established in 1920 and became an international airport in 1924 with flights to Geneva, Switzerland.

After the 1940 Battle of France during World War II initially the Lyon area was part of the southern unoccupied zone of France (Vichy France), and limited air service remained at the airport. In addition, the Vichy French Air Force (French: Armée de l'Air de Vichy) stationed GR I/36, equipped with Potez 630 heavy fighters at the airport. However, after the Allied invasion of French North Africa (Operation Torch), Nazi forces moved into the area (Case Anton) in November 1942 and took control of Bron Airport and seized the military aircraft assigned to it.

It was used as a military airfield beginning in 1943 by the German Luftwaffe, being used as a radar station by Nachtjagdraumführer 109 (NJRF 109) to detect Royal Air Force bombers flying over Occupied France at night to targets in Italy. It was attacked by the United States Army Air Force 407th Bombardment Squadron (92d BG) in April 1944, causing heavy damage.

In mid-August 1944, prisoners from Montluc prison were taken to Bron where 109 of them, including 72 Jews, were killed in what would become known as Le Charnier de Bron ("The Charnel house of Bron").

After the Normandy Invasion of France by Allied Forces, the USAAF 50th Fighter Group used the airport flying P-47 Thunderbolts in support of ground forces in Southern France from September 25 - November 1944. It was designated as Advanced Landing Ground "Y-6". The 121st Liaison Squadron flew Cessna UC-78 and Stinson L-5 observation aircraft in support of the Sixth Army Group from the airport until March 1945, ending American military use of the airport.

After the war, it was the main commercial airport for Lyon. In 1950/51 when, as a result of the Cold War threat of the Soviet Union, Bron Airport was proposed by the United States Air Force to become a USAF air logistics and maintenance depot as part of a NATO commitment to establish a modern Air Force Base at the site. In the ongoing negotiations, the site was ultimately rejected.

In 1975 commercial airline traffic was moved to the new Lyon–Saint-Exupéry Airport, and Bron Airport is now used for general aviation.

== See also ==
- Lyon–Saint Exupéry Airport
- List of airports in France
- Advanced Landing Ground
