= Space Base Delta 41 =

United States Space Force military unit

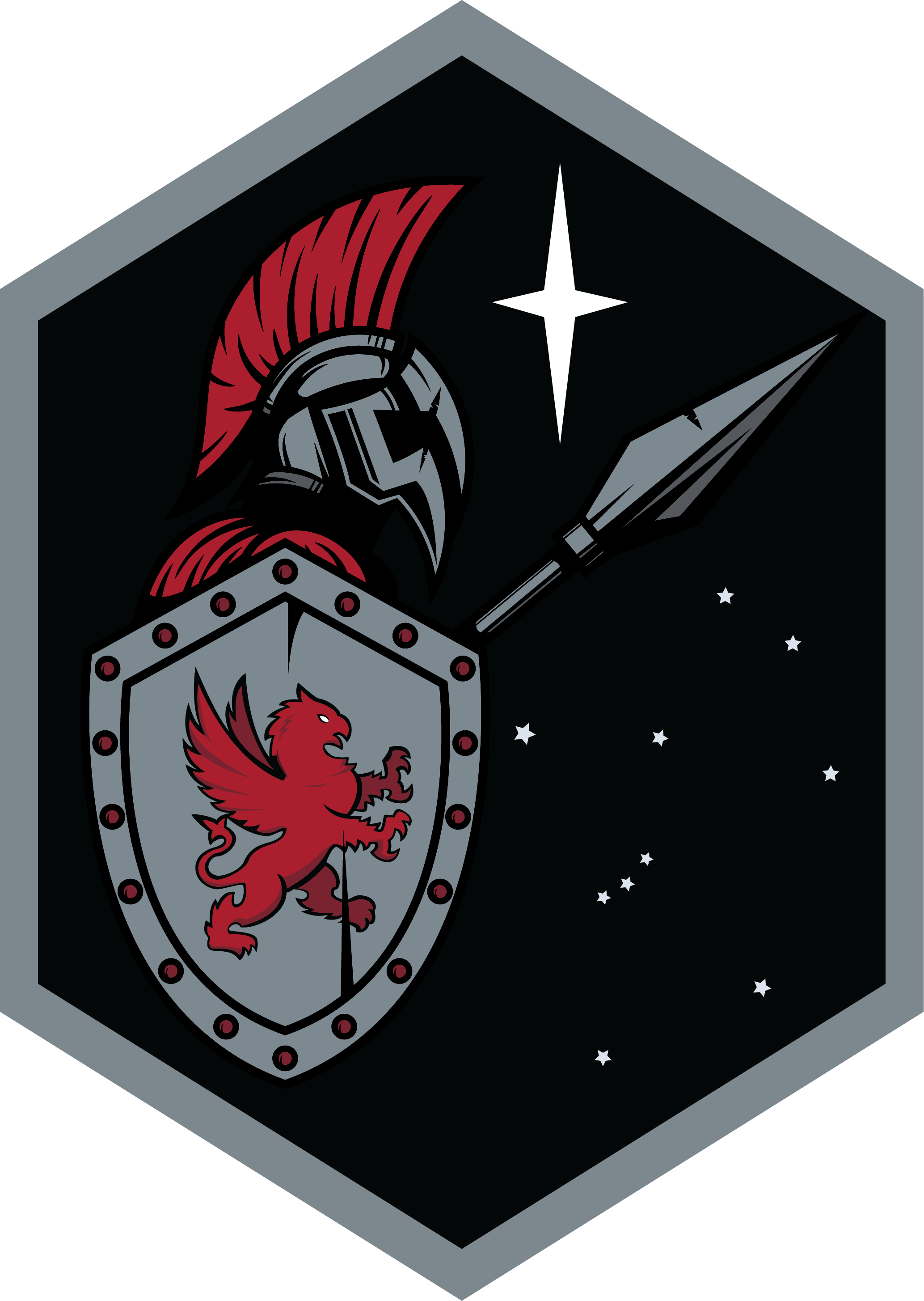
- Active: 2025-present
- Country: United States
- Branch: Space Force
- Part of: United States Space Force Combat Forces Command
- Headquarters: Schriever Space Force Base, Colorado Springs, Colo.
- Website: https://www.petersonschriever.spaceforce.mil/SpaceBaseDelta41/

Commanders
- Current commander: Col Eric D. Bogue
- Deputy Commander: Col David Berríos
- Senior Enlisted Leader: CMSgt Timothy Crouch
- Senior Enlisted Airman: CMSgt Gerald Morey

Insignia
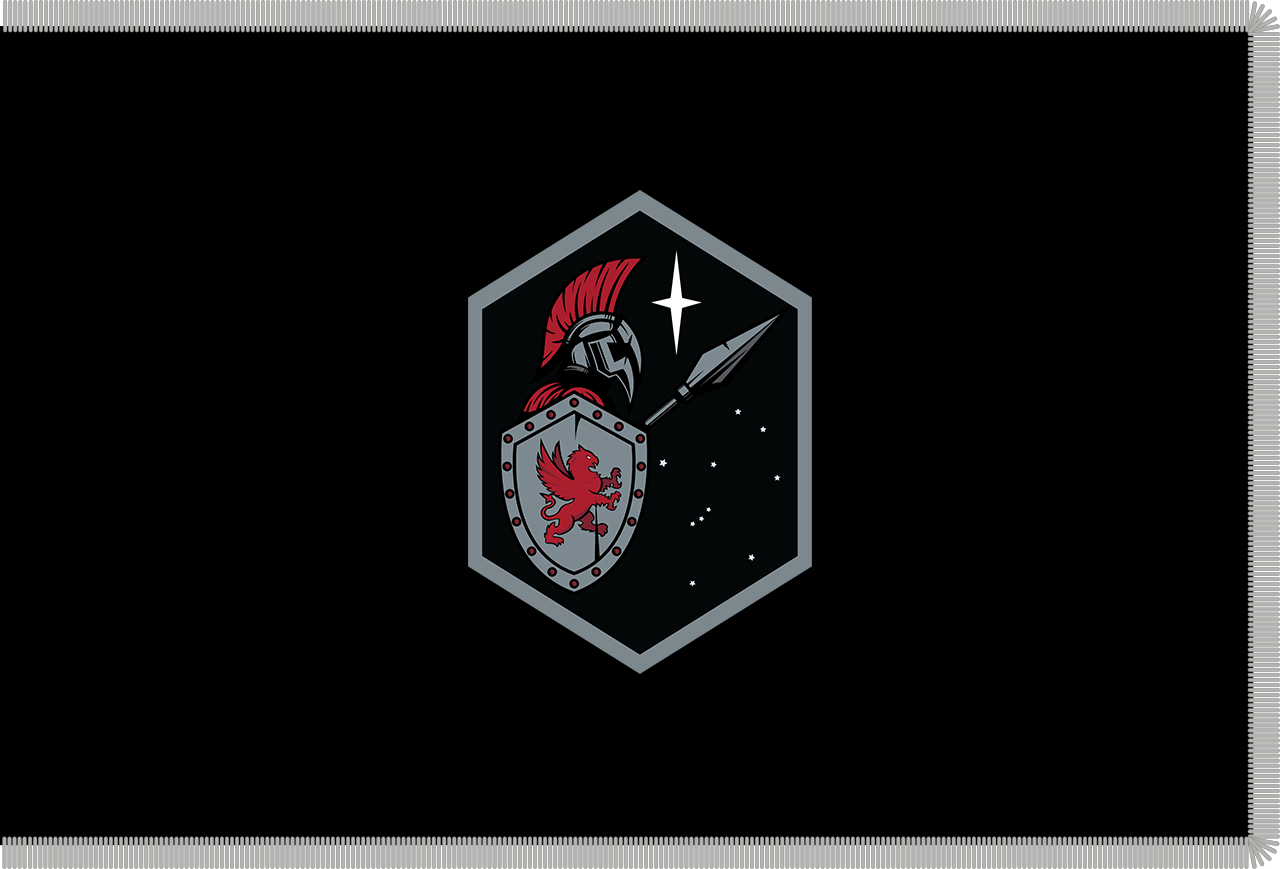
- SPACE BASE DELTA 41 FLAG

Space Base Delta 41 (SBD 41) is a unit of the United States Space Force that provides installation support to Schriever Space Force Base east of Colorado Springs, Colorado. It is assigned to Space Operations Command and headquartered at Schriever Space Force Base in Colorado Springs, Colorado. The Delta was activated in 2025 and will be taking over many of the responsibilities of Space Base Delta 1 at Schriever.

SBD 41 is responsible for providing combat support and installation support to units and the Guardians, Airmen, and families stationed at Schriever SFB.

== Components ==
- SBD 41 Delta Staff Agencies
- 50th Civil Engineer Squadron (50 CES) - Peterson Space Force Base
- 50th Comptroller Squadron (50 CPTS) - Peterson Space Force Base
- 50th Contracting Squadron (50 CONS) - Peterson Space Force Base
- 50th Force Support Squadron (50 FSS) - Schriever Space Force Base
- 50th Logistics Readiness Flight (50 LRF) - Schriever Space Force Base
- 50th Security Forces Squadron (50 SFS) - Schriever Space Force Base

Geographically separated units:

- Detachment 3, 21st Space Operations Squadron - Ka’ena Point Space Force Station, Hawaii
- 23rd Space Operations Squadron - New Boston SFS, New Hampshire

== Emblem ==
The SBD 41 emblem is a black hexagon with a silver gray outline representing Space Operations Command. The Centurion symbolizes strength, discipline, courage, and endurance. The constellation Orion embodies the spirit of a hunter. The four pointed star atop the badge is the star Polaris signifying a constant presence and vigilance in pursuit of excellence. The red griffin on the shield represents the strength of a lion and the flight of an eagle - a symbol of Schriever Space Force Base.

== List of commanders ==
No.	Commander		Term			Ref.
No.	Portrait	Name	Took office	Left office	Duration	Ref.
1	Eric D. Bogue	Colonel; Eric D. Bogue	18 June 2025	Incumbent	1 year, 31 days	
