= Space Delta 12 =

U.S. Space Force test and evaluation unit

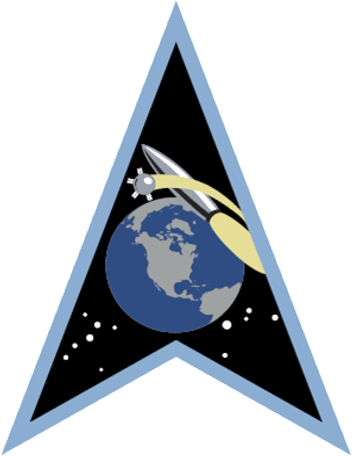
- Delta emblem
- Founded: 23 August 2021; 4 years ago
- Country: United States
- Branch: United States Space Force
- Type: Delta
- Role: Space test and evaluation
- Part of: Space Training and Readiness Command
- Headquarters: Schriever Space Force Base, Colorado
- Nickname: Big Dogs
- Website: Official website

Commanders
- Commander: Col Sacha N. Tomlinson
- Senior Enlisted Leader: CMSgt Samantha Ward

Insignia
- Guidon

Space Delta 12 (DEL 12) is a United States Space Force unit responsible for space test and evaluation. It tests space systems and capabilities in support of weapon system acquisition, operational acceptance, and readiness. It was established on 23 August 2021 following the establishment of the Space Training and Readiness Command, the field command to which it reports. It is temporarily headquartered at Schriever Space Force Base, Colorado, but its final location requires a base selection process.

DEL 12 was originally activated as the USAF’s 6565th Test Wing in October 1960 at Vandenberg AFB, CA. The wing was re-designated as the 6565th Test Wing (Development) in December 1960 and was subsequently re-designated, this time as the 6595th Aerospace Test Wing, in April 1961. The wing was inactivated in October 1979. It was reactivated on 23 August 2021 and redesignated as Space Delta 12.

A ceremony was held on 27 August 2021, activating three squadrons and redesignating two squadrons that were realigned under DEL 12.

== Structure ==
DEL 12 is one of five deltas that reports to the Space Training and Readiness Command. It is composed of the following five subordinate squadrons:

Squadron	Function	Headquarters
12th Delta Operations Squadron	Delta staff and squadron management	Schriever Space Force Base, Colorado
1st Test and Evaluation Squadron	Space command and control capabilities testing	Schriever Space Force Base, Colorado
3rd Test and Evaluation Squadron	Orbital warfare capabilities testing	Schriever Space Force Base, Colorado
4th Test and Evaluation Squadron	Electromagnetic spectrum capabilities testing	Peterson Space Force Base, Colorado
17th Test and Evaluation Squadron	Missile warning, missile defense, space domain awareness, intelligence surveillance and reconnaissance, and cyber weapon system testing	Schriever Space Force Base, Colorado
593rd Test and Evaluation Squadron	Test workforce development	Edwards Air Force Base, California

== History ==
6595th Aerospace Test Wing
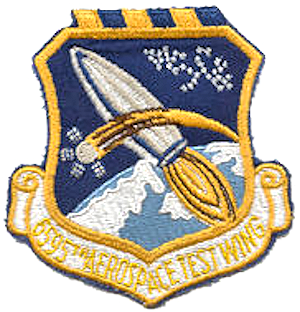
- Emblem of the 6595th Aerospace Test Wing
- Active: 1960-1979
- Country: United States
- Branch: United States Air Force

In July 1958, Air Research and Development Command (ARDC) through its Air Force Ballistic Missile Division (AFBMD), the office continued the work of managing launch facility construction. It also conducted research and development flight tests of Thor and Atlas missiles; supported SAC's deployment of operational versions of these missiles; and launched unmanned space vehicles into polar orbit around the Earth.

By 1960, the launch rate at Vandenberg had increased four-fold since the first launch in December 1958. To keep pace with this growing momentum, AFBMD enlarged its field office into the 6565th Test Wing (Ballistic Missiles and Space Systems) in October 1960.

In December, the parenthetical designator was changed to "(Development)," though the unit remained the 6565th Test Wing. When ARDC was restructured and redesignated as Air Force Systems Command on April 1, 1961, that same order also reassigned the wing to Space Systems Division in Los Angeles. In November 1961, the wing was redesignated the 6595th Aerospace Test Wing.

On May 15, 1964. At Vandenberg, Headquarters Air Force Western Test Range (AFWTR) was established and was assigned to a new National Range Division, organized at Andrews AFB, Maryland.

Starting in 1970, Air Force System Command (AFSC) and the Strategic Air Command (SAC) organizations at Vandenberg underwent numerous reorganizations and realignments. The first of these major changes involving AFSC units occurred on April 1, 1970. HQ AFWTR, and the 6595th Aerospace Test Wing were realigned under a new organization at Vandenberg called the Space and Missile Test Center (SAMTEC). SAMTEC was assigned to the Space and Missile Systems Organization (SAMSO) in Los Angeles.

In the SAMTEC reorganization, Headquarters AFWTR was inactivated; the 6595th Aerospace Test Wing was restructured by transferring its support elements to the staff of the new organization, and redesignating its primary mission elements from program divisions to 6595th space and missile test groups.

On October 1, 1979, HQ SAMTEC was redesignated Headquarters Space and Missile Test Organization (SAMTO). At the same time, the 6595th Aerospace Test Wing was inactivated.

The 6595th Aerospace Test Wing was reactivated and redesignated as Space Delta 12, Space Training and Readiness Command, United States Space Force, on 23 Aug 21, with the mission of test and evaluation of USSF capabilities.

=== Lineage ===
- Established as 6565th Test Wing (Ballistic Missiles and Space Systems) and activated on 20 October 1960

Redesignated: 6565th Test Wing (Development), 1 December 1960
Redesignated: 6595th Aerospace Test Wing, 1 April 1961
Inactivated on 1 October 1979.
Reactivated and redesignated: Space Delta 12, 23 August 2021

=== Assignments ===
- Air Force Ballistic Missile Division, 20 October 1960
- Space Systems Division, Air Force Systems Command, 1 April 1961
- Space and Missile Test Center (SAMTEC), 1 April 1970 – 1 October 1979
- Space Training and Readiness Command (STARCOM), 23 August 2021 – Present

=== Historical components ===
- 6595th Missile Test Group, Vandenburg CA, 1 May 1970 – 1 October 1979
- 6595th Space (later Satellite) Test Group, 1 May 1970 – 1 October 1979
- 6595th Space Transportation Test Group, 21 May-1 October 1979

=== Stations ===
- Vandenberg AFB, California, 20 October 1960 – 1 October 1979
- Schriever SFB, Colorado, 23 August 2021 – Present

=== Major Off-Base and Detached Installations ===
- Bikini Test Site, Marshall Islands, 1 July 1965 – 21 November 1969
- Eniwetok Auxiliary Field, Kwajalein Island, 1 July 1965 – 16 September 1976
- South Point AFS, Hawaii, 1 Jul 1965-1 October 1979

18°54′59″N 155°40′36″W
Opened in support of Project Have Lent, a sounding rocket probe program to evaluate advanced ballistic reentry system experiments. The close proximity and aspect angle of South Point to the optical site sensors located on the island of Maui The close proximity and aspect angle of South Point to the optical site sensors located on the island of Maui. In 1979, the Station was divided in two parcels located about 1.5 miles apart, containing approximately six acres each. One of the sites was the main operations area, while the other areas was used for a boresight tower.

== List of commanders ==
No.	Commander		Term			Ref
No.	Portrait	Name	Took office	Left office	Term length	Ref
1	Peter J. Flores	Colonel; Peter J. Flores	23 August 2021	6 July 2022	317 days	
2	E. Lincoln Bonner III	Colonel; E. Lincoln Bonner III	6 July 2022	31 May 2024	1 year, 330 days	
3	Sacha N. Tomlinson	Colonel; Sacha N. Tomlinson	31 May 2024	Incumbent	1 year, 332 days	
