= 68th Cyberspace Squadron =

U.S. Space Force unit

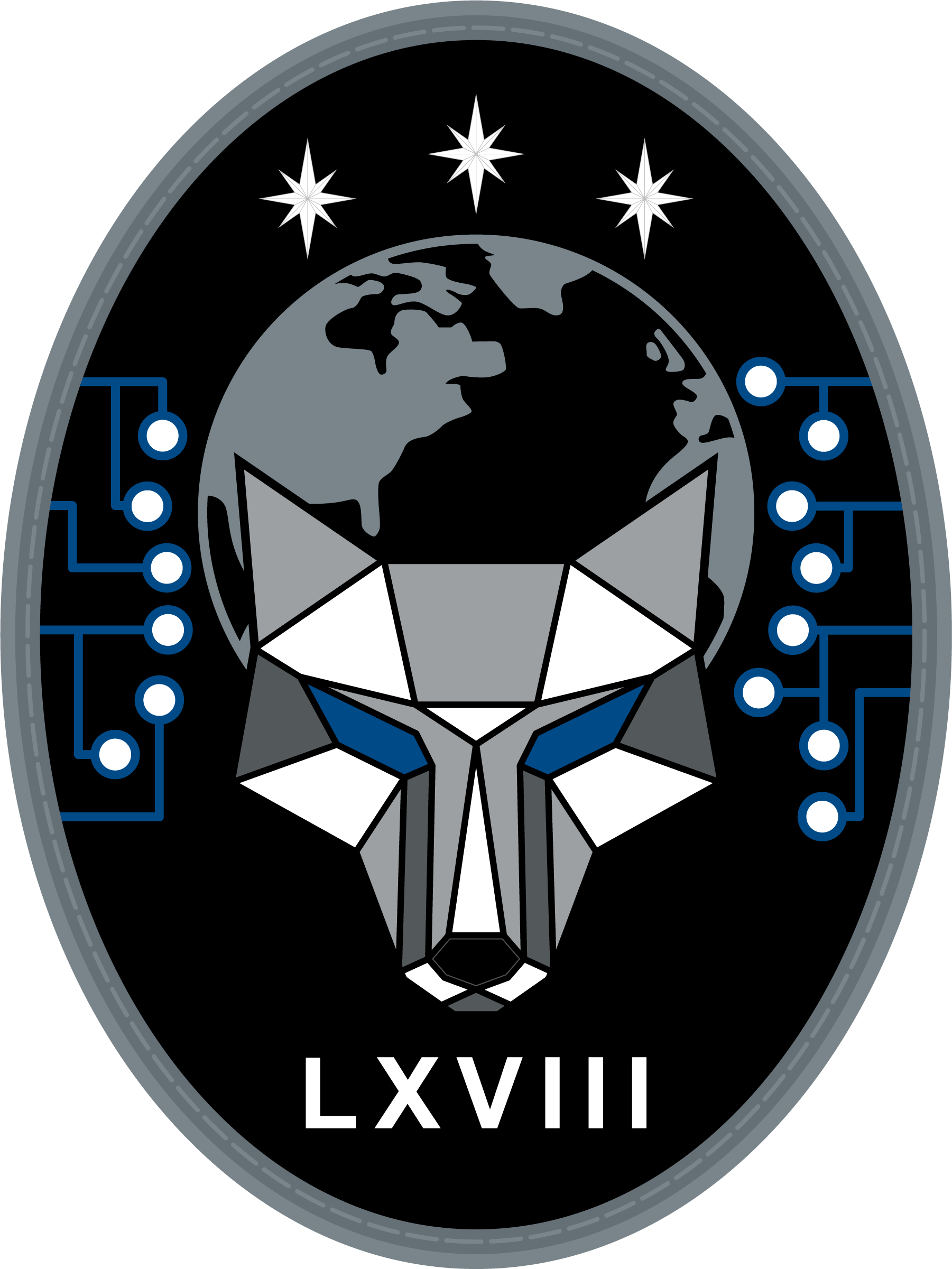
- 68 CYS emblem
- Active: 2022–present
- Country: United States
- Branch: United States Space Force
- Type: Squadron
- Role: Cyber operations
- Part of: Space Delta 6
- Headquarters: Schriever Space Force Base, Colorado, U.S.

Commanders
- Commander: Lt Col Andrew Buchanan

The 68th Cyberspace Squadron (68 CYS) is a United States Space Force unit assigned to Space Operations Command's Space Delta 6. It provides information with regards to further protecting and adding additional layers of defense of space-based systems. It is headquartered at Schriever Space Force Base, Colorado. It was activated on 4 November 2022.

== List of commanders ==
- Lt Col Tori Leigh Touzin, 4 November 2022 – 8 March 2024
- Lt Col Andrew J Buchanan, 8 March 2024 - Present

== See also ==
- Space Delta 6
