= 1st Reconnaissance Squadron (disambiguation) =

The 1st Reconnaissance Squadron is an active United States Air Force unit, originally organized as the 1st Provisional Aero Squadron in 1913. It has held this designation since September 1991.

1st Reconnaissance Squadron may also refer to:

- The 91st Air Refueling Squadron, designated the 1st Reconnaissance Squadron (Heavy) from January 1941 to April 1942
- The 41st Electronic Combat Squadron, designated the 1st Reconnaissance Squadron (Special) from April 1943 to November 1944
- The 1st Air and Space Test Squadron, designated the 1st Reconnaissance Squadron, Very Long Range, Photographic, RCM and 1st Reconnaissance Squadron, Very Long Range, Photographic from October 1945 to March 1947
- The 1st Tactical Reconnaissance Squadron, designated the 1st Reconnaissance Squadron, Night Photographic from July 1947 to 1948

== See also ==
- 1st Photographic Reconnaissance Squadron
- 1st Strategic Reconnaissance Squadron
- 1st Tactical Reconnaissance Squadron
- 1st Weather Reconnaissance Squadron
