= Space Defense Center (disambiguation) =

Space Defense Center was a 1960-70s operations center in Cheyenne Mountain

Space Defense Center may also refer to:

- Aerospace Defense Center, a 1979-86 USAF Direct Reporting Unit after the major command, Aerospace Defense Command, was deactivated
- Ballistic Missile Defense Center, a "mid-1970s" operations center at Cheyenne Mountain Complex
- Joint Space Operations Center, a joint center for branches of the Department of Defense
- Missile and Space Intelligence Center of the Defense Intelligence Agency
- Missile Defense Integration and Operations Center at Schriever Air Force Base
- Mission Control Center at the Ronald Reagan Ballistic Missile Defense Test Site on Kwajalein Atoll
- National Space Defense Center, renamed from Joint Interagency Combined Space Operations Center (JICSpOC) in 2017
- Space and Missile Defense Technical Center (SMDTC), a component of United States Army Space and Missile Defense Command
- Space and Missile Defense Acquisition Center (SMDAC), a component of United States Army Space and Missile Defense Command
- Space Control Center, a Vandenberg AFB facility moved from Cheyenne Mountain in 2006
- Space Defense Operations Center (SPADOC), a Cheyenne Mountain operations center in warm standby
