= 12th Delta Operations Squadron =

U.S. Space Force unit

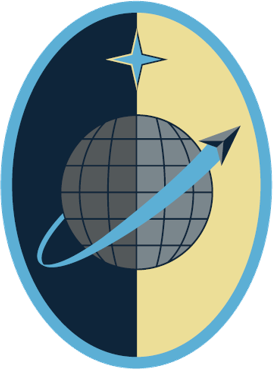
- Squadron emblem
- Country: United States
- Branch: United States Space Force
- Type: Squadron
- Role: Operations support
- Part of: Space Delta 12
- Headquarters: Schriever Space Force Base, Colorado, U.S.

Commanders
- Commander: Lt Col Israel Abensur

Insignia
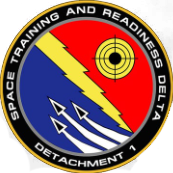
- STAR Delta, Detachment 1 emblem

The 12th Delta Operations Squadron (12 DOS) is a United States Space Force unit assigned to Space Training and Readiness Command's Space Delta 12. It leads the delta's headquarters staff and manages cross-functioning processes of squadrons across the delta. It is headquartered at Schriever Space Force Base, Colorado.

== List of commanders ==
- Lt Col Jonathon R. Noonan, ~16 July 2021
- Lt Col Israel Abensur, 30 June 2023

== See also ==
- Space Delta 12
