= 4th Test and Evaluation Squadron =

U.S. Space Force unit

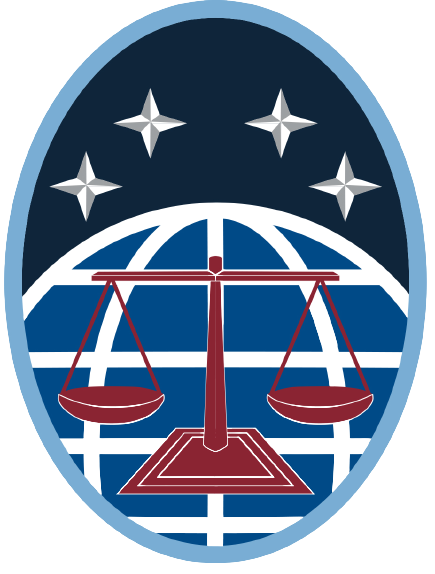
- Squadron emblem
- Country: United States
- Branch: United States Space Force
- Type: Squadron
- Role: Test and Evaluation
- Part of: Space Delta 12
- Headquarters: Peterson Space Force Base, Colorado, U.S.

Commanders
- Commander: Lt Col Jonathan Lang

The 4th Test and Evaluation Squadron (4 TES) is a United States Space Force unit. Assigned to Space Training and Readiness Command's Space Delta 12, it is responsible for testing and evaluating the Space Force's electromagnetic spectrum capabilities. It is headquartered at Peterson Space Force Base, Colorado.

== History ==
Limited information is available on the early history of the 4th Test & Evaluation Squadron, as its earliest existence was as the designation for a classified unit working on the LGM-118 Peacekeeper. The unit was reactivated in February 1984 as Detachment 4 of the US Air Force Operational Test and Evaluation Center (AFOTEC) to support space-related test teams and to serve as AFOTEC's liaison with US and Air Force Space Commands as well as the North American Air Defense Command (NORAD).

By the 21st century, AFOTEC Detachment 4's scope had expanded to the evaluation of new space, cyberspace, missile and missile defense capabilities with a focus on testing weapons systems in operationally realistic environments. In 2019, Det 4 had been assigned to operationally test and provide feedback for over 30 separate weapons systems.

In March 2020, the U.S. Space Force announced plans to transfer 23 U.S. Air Force organizations to the Space Force, providing the new force with personnel with relevant expertise and experience. The Space Force identified AFOTEC Detachment 4 as one among those organizations identified for transfer. As a result, the USSF 4th Test and Evaluation Squadron was constituted on 19 August 2021 and activated on 23 August 2021.

As a USSF squadron, 4TES has continued in its mission to test and evaluate new space, missile, and missile defense capabilities in operationally realistic environments to inform warfighters and influence national resource decisions.

While the current activities of the squadron remain generally unavailable, the USSF has provided some insight of the squadron's portfolio through awards citations and other special recognitions. In 2023, the squadron was selected as the Space Force's "Cyber Operations Team of the Year", with the citation stating, "the team led a series of red and blue team test events, successfully identifying potential vulnerabilities within a portfolio of programs valued at $161 billion." 4TES was cited as STARCOM's "Organization of the Year" in 2023, and again in 2024

In 2021, 2022, and 2023 respectively, 4TES personnel became the first Space Force Guardians to graduate from United States Army Air Assault School, Sapper Leader Course, and Ranger School. In 2024, 4TES personnel were among the first Guardians to graduate from U.S. Air Force Test Pilot School in the first "Integrated Flight-Space Test Course"

== List of commanders ==
- Lt Col Ryan Caulk, 27 August 2021
- Lt Col Benjamin Szutar, 1 June 2022
- Lt Col Jonathan Lang, 2 July 2024

== See also ==
- Space Delta 12
