= 1st Test and Evaluation Squadron =

US Space Force unit

- Squadron emblem
- Active: 1940–1947; 1969–1991; 2003–2019; 2021–present
- Country: United States
- Branch: United States Space Force
- Role: Test space command and control
- Part of: Space Delta 12
- Garrison/HQ: Schriever Space Force Base, Colorado
- Mottos: Totem in eo est... On this, all depends
- Engagements: European-African-Middle East Theater; Asiatic-Pacific Theater
- Decorations: Air Force Outstanding Unit Award

Commanders
- Current commander: Lt Col Kathryn Johnson

Insignia
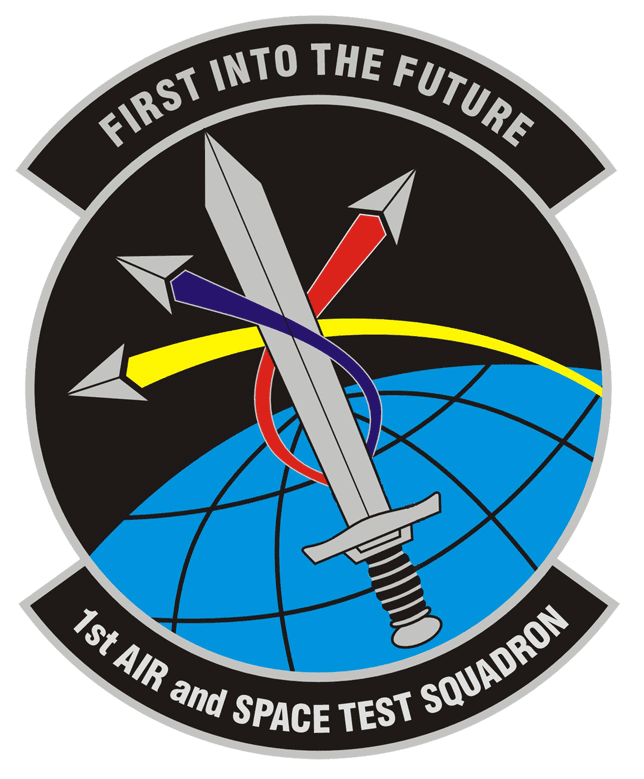
- 1st Air and Space Test Squadron emblem

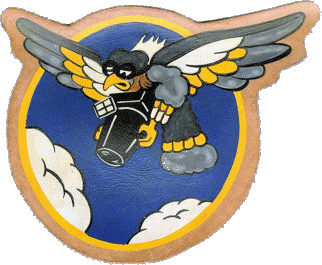
- 1st Photographic Squadron emblem (approved 3 October 1941)

The 1st Test and Evaluation Squadron (1 TES) is a United States Space Force test and evaluation unit, located at Schriever Space Force Base, Colorado. The squadron is tasked with testing and evaluation of command and control systems for Space Operations Command.

1 TES was activated on 27 August 2021 and assigned to Space Delta 12, Space Training and Readiness Command.

== Mission ==
Evaluate relevant command and control systems and plans for Space Operations Command, integrating continuously improving joint-combat capability to space warfighters and commanders.

== History ==
=== World War II ===
The squadron was established by Headquarters, United States Army Air Corps in early 1940 as the 1st Photographic Squadron. It performed aerial mapping primarily over the northeastern United States prior to the Pearl Harbor Attack, using obsolescent cargo and Martin B-10 bombers. After the United States entry into World War II, equipped with Lockheed A-29 Hudsons, Beech C-45 Expeditors and Douglas A-20 Havocs, they performed aerial photography and mapping over uncharted areas of Newfoundland, Labrador and Greenland for development of the Northeast Transport Route for the movement of aircraft, personnel and supplies across the North Atlantic from the United States to Iceland and the United Kingdom.

The squadron re-equipped with long-range Consolidated B-24 Liberator reconnaissance aircraft and deployed to Alaska in late 1943, assisting in the establishment of landing fields in the Aleutian Islands; they also mapped uncharted areas of internal Alaska to establish Lend Lease aircraft emergency landing fields over the trans-Alaska route from Ladd Field and Elmendorf Field to Nome.

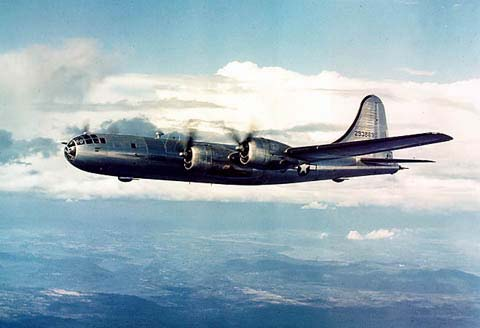
B-29 (operated by squadron 1944-1947)

After the squadron was relieved from assignment in Alaska and returned to the Continental United States it deployed to the Mediterranean Theater of Operations across the South Atlantic Transport Route to North Africa in early 1944. It performed aerial surveys and mapping over Sicily; Italy and along the North African Coast and Middle East with B-24s and some Boeing B-17Fs converted to F-9 reconnaissance configuration over non-combat areas. It then deployed to India and China; performing unarmed long-range mapping of remote areas of the China-Burma-India Theater over combat areas in support of ground forces and strategic target identification over Indochina and the Malay Peninsula for follow-up raids by XX Bomber Command operating from India.

The unit returned to the United States in late 1944. It was equipped with very long range Boeing B-29 Superfortresses converted to F-13A reconnaissance configuration. It deployed to the Central Pacific Area after the Surrender of Japan and was assigned to the Eighth Air Force. The squadron performed reconnaissance mapping flights over Japan, Korea and China. The B-29s returned to the United States in early 1946 for storage or reassignment; unit largely demobilized on Okinawa, flying some light liaison and courier aircraft. It was inactivated in early 1947 and disbanded on 8 October 1948.

=== Test Operations in the Pacific ===
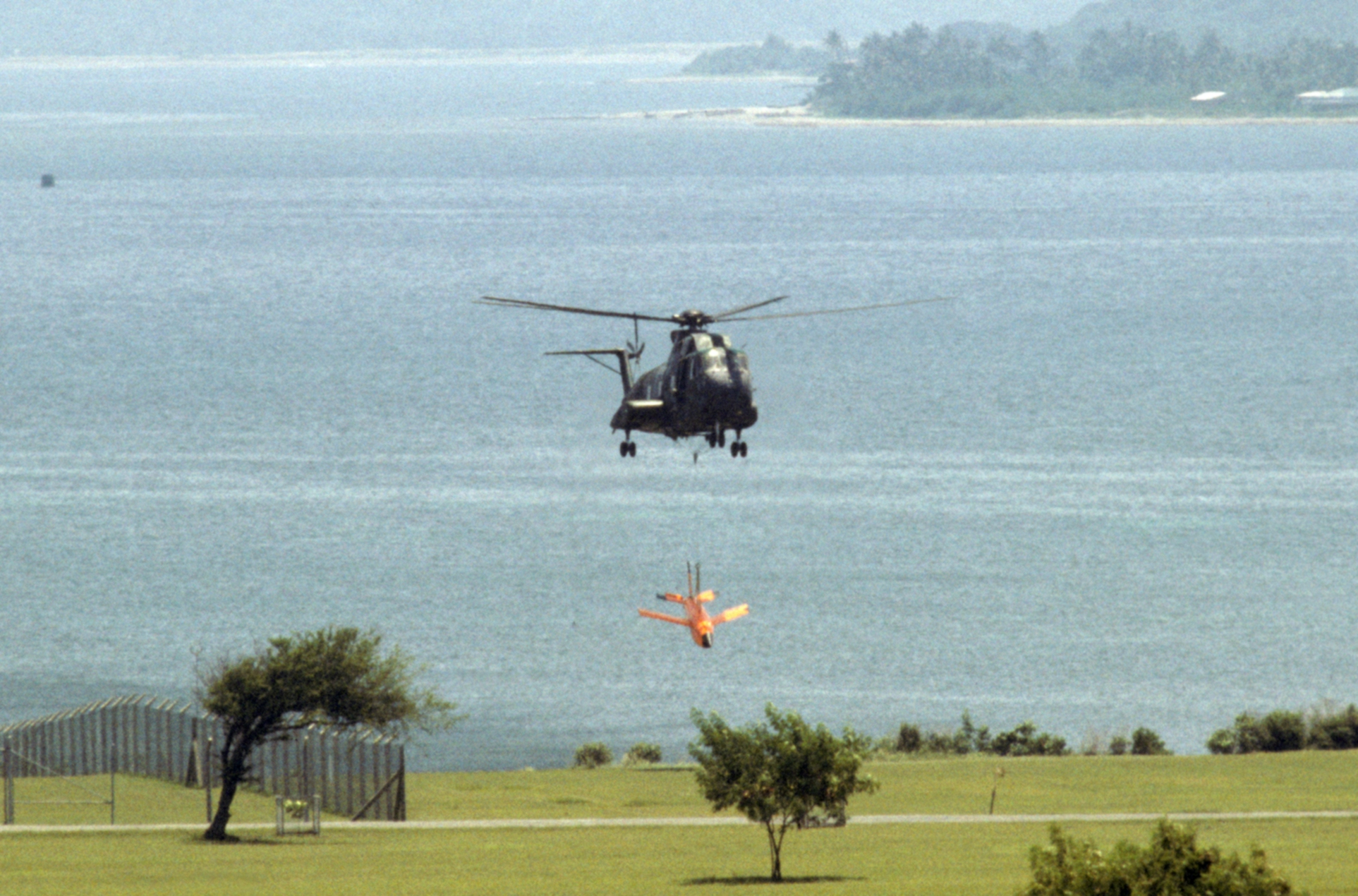
BQM-34 Firebee being returned to Wallace AFS

The squadron replaced the 6400th Test Squadron, which had been organized in 1967, in 1969. It conducted weapons system evaluation, known as COMBAT SAGE, of F-4 aircraft, of F-15 aircraft from 1980, and of F-16 aircraft from 1982, until shortly before inactivation. It also trained visiting aircrews from other Pacific Air Forces units in weapons employment and tactics.

=== Space Launch Test ===
The 1st Air and Space Test Squadron was a unit of the 30th Space Wing of the United States Air Force, responsible for spacelift and test operations.

The squadron's operations included launching of the Minotaur I and Minotaur IV and Pegasus rockets; as well as testing the Boeing Interceptor and Minotaur II target vehicles.

The squadron's mission was to provide complete service launch and test operations for current and future space launch vehicles, targets, interceptors and experimental space systems.

=== Space Command and Control Test ===
Upon its creation, the United States Space Force was assigned the cornerstone responsibility of "preserving freedom of action" in space. This required the creation of new capabilities to protect and defend the domain. This included, for the first time, a need to laterally integrate diverse and disparate space and ground systems into combined arms teams. In response to this need, the Command and Control Enterprise Test Team (C2ETT) was established at Peterson AFB in December, 2020 to begin testing a new generation of command and control and space battle management systems for Guardians.

In August 2021, following the activation of Space Training and Readiness Command and Delta 12, the 1st Test and Evaluation Squadron was activated. Initially, 1 TES absorbed the activities of the C2ETT and integrated two detachments of the former 17th Test Squadron, aligning more than 10 space command and control systems under test under a single commander for the first time.

1 TES now conducts command and control and enterprise test activities from its main location at Schriever SFB, Colorado, Detachment 1 at Vandenberg SFB, California, and Detachment 2, Cheyenne Mountain SFS, Colorado.

== Lineage ==
1st Photographic Squadron

- Constituted as the 1st Photographic Squadron on 22 December 1939

Activated on 1 February 1940
Redesignated 1st Mapping Squadron on 13 January 1942
Redesignated 1st Photographic Mapping Squadron on 9 June 1942
Redesignated 1st Photographic Charting Squadron on 11 August 1943
Redesignated 1st Photographic Reconnaissance Squadron, Very Heavy on 10 November 1944
Redesignated 1st Reconnaissance Squadron, Very Long Range, Photographic-RCM (Note: RCM (Radio Countermeasures) would later be more commonly referred to as electronic countermeasures.) on 4 October 1945
Redesignated 1st Reconnaissance Squadron, Very Long Range, Photographic on 13 November 1945
Inactivated on 10 March 1947
Disbanded on 8 October 1948
Reconstituted and consolidated with the 1st Test Squadron on 19 September 1985

1st Test Squadron

- Constituted as the 1st Test Squadron on 12 September 1969

Activated on 15 October 1969
Consolidated with the 1st Reconnaissance Squadron on 19 September 1985
Inactivated on 30 October 1991

- Redesignated 1st Air and Space Test Squadron on 28 October 2003

Activated on 1 December 2003
Inactivated on 15 Aug 2019

1st Test and Evaluation Squadron

- Activated on 27 August 2021

=== Assignments ===
- Office of Chief of Air Corps, 1 February 1940
- 1st Photographic Group (later 1st Mapping Group, 1st Photographic Charting Group), 10 June 1941
- 11th Photographic Group, 1 December 1943
- 311th Photographic Wing, 5 October 1944
- Second Air Force, 10 November 1944 (attached to Eighth Air Force, c. 9 September 1945)
- 311th Reconnaissance Wing, 4 October 1945 (attached to United States Army Strategic Air Forces (Pacific) 4 October 1945, Far East Air Forces 21 November 1945, VII Bomber Command 10 December 1945, Eighth Air Force March 1946, 1st Air Division 7 June 1946
- Far East Air Forces, 3 February 1947
- Thirteenth Air Force, 11 February 1947 - 10 March 1947 (attached to 5th Reconnaissance Group)
- 6th Air Division, 15 October 1969
- Thirteenth Air Force 15 December 1969
- 405th Fighter Wing, 20 April 1970
- 3d Tactical Fighter Wing, 16 September 1974
- 6200d Tactical Fighter Training Group, 1 January 1980 - 30 October 1991
- 30th Launch Group, 1 December 2003 – 15 Aug 2019
- Space Delta 12, 27 August 2021 – present

=== Stations ===
- Bolling Field, District of Columbia, 1 February 1940
- Bradley Field, Connecticut, 5 December 1941
- MacDill Field, Florida, 15 January 1944 (deployed to Accra Airfield, Gold Coast, British West Africa, 11 March 1944 - 13 October 1944)
- Smoky Hill Army Air Field, Kansas, 26 October 1944 - 31 July 1945
- Kadena Field, Okinawa, 9 September 1945
- Clark Field, Philippines, 11 February 1947 - 10 March 1947
- Clark Air Base, Philippines, 15 October 1969 - 30 October 1991 (The 1st Test Squadron had been active at Clark AFB for some time when I rotated back to the CONUS on 15 August 1968.)
- Vandenberg Air Force Base, California, 1 December 2003 – 15 Aug 2019
- Schriever Space Force Base, Colorado, 27 August 2021 – present

=== Aircraft ===
- Douglas A-20 Havoc, 1942
- Lockheed A-29 Hudson, 1941-1942
- Martin B-10, 1940
- Boeing B-17 Flying Fortress, 1943-1944
- Consolidated B-24 Liberator, 1942-1945
- North American B-25 Mitchell, 1943
- Boeing B-29 Superfortress, 1944-1947
- Lockheed B-34, 1942-1945
- Fairchild C-8, 1940
- Beech C-45 Expeditor, 1940, 1946-1947
- Beech F-2 (see C-45)
- Douglas F-3 (see A-20)
- Consolidated F-7 (see B-24)
- Boeing F-9 (see B-17)
- Boeing F-13 (see B-29)
- Piper L-4, 1946
- Stinson L-5 Sentinel 1946-1947
- McDonnell Douglas F-4 Phantom II, 1969-unkn (at least until 1989)
- McDonnell Douglas F-15 Eagle, 1980-unkn (at least until 1989)
- General Dynamics F-16 Fighting Falcon, 1982-unkn (at least until 1989)
- Ryan BQM-34A Firebee, 1969-1989
- Raytheon MQM-107 Streaker, 1989-unkn.

=== Space Systems Tested ===
- Minotaur IV, 2017
- Space C2 Open-architecture Operational Prototype (SCOOP), 2020–present
- ATLAS, 2021–present
- Combatant Commanders Integrated Command and Control System (CCIC2S), 2021–present

=== Decorations ===
- Air Force Outstanding Unit Award
- 3 April 1975 – 31 May 31, 1975
- 1 July 1976 – 30 June 30, 1977
- 1 April 1980 – 31 March 1982
- 1 July 1985 – 30 June 30, 1987
- 1 June 1988 – 1 June 1990
- Philippine Republic Presidential Unit Citation
- 21 July 1972 – 15 August 1972
- American Theater of World War II
- European Theater of World War II
- Pacific Theater

== List of commanders ==
- Maj Donald G. Stitt, 1 Feb 1940
- Maj Minton W. Kaye, 15 Nov 1940
- Capt Charles P. Hollstein, 10 Jun 1941
- Maj Richard W. Philbrick, May 1942
- Maj Albert M. Welsh, Dec 1942
- Maj Foster S. Randle Jr., Apr 1944
- Lt Col Albert M. Welsh, 16 Nov 1944
- Maj Foster S. Randle Jr., 10 Oct 1945
- Maj Howard E. Brown, 17 Dec 1945
- Unkn, Jan-Mar 1947
- Lt Col William E. Powers, 15 Oct 1969
- Lt Col William R. Martin, 21 Aug 1970
- Lt Col William J. Watson, 27 Jun 1972
- Lt Col Don O. Quane, 30 Jun 1973
- Lt Col Jerry N. Hoblit, 17 Jan 1975
- Lt Col James R. Alley, 25 Feb 1977
- Lt Col Charles N. Nielsen, 20 Nov 1978
- Lt Col Charles H. Holden, 30 Jun 1980
- Lt Col Roger L. Prather, 21 Jun 1982
- Lt Col Michael F. Tedesco, 1 Jun 1984
- Lt Col Willard H. Whitley, Jan 1986
- Lt Col Robert F. Fischer, Feb 1987
- Unkn, Jan 1988-30 Oct 1991
- Lt Col Kris E. Barcomb, June 2014 – July 2016
- Lt Col Jarrod Martin, July 2016 – June 2018
- Lt Col Brian Chatman, June 2018 - 25 June 2019
- Lt Col Ross Conrad, 27 August 2021 – 14 June 2024
- Lt Col Kathryn Johnson, 14 June 2024 – present
