= Schriever Space Force Base =

U.S. Space Force base near Colorado Springs, Colorado, United States

- Near Colorado Springs, Colorado, in the United States
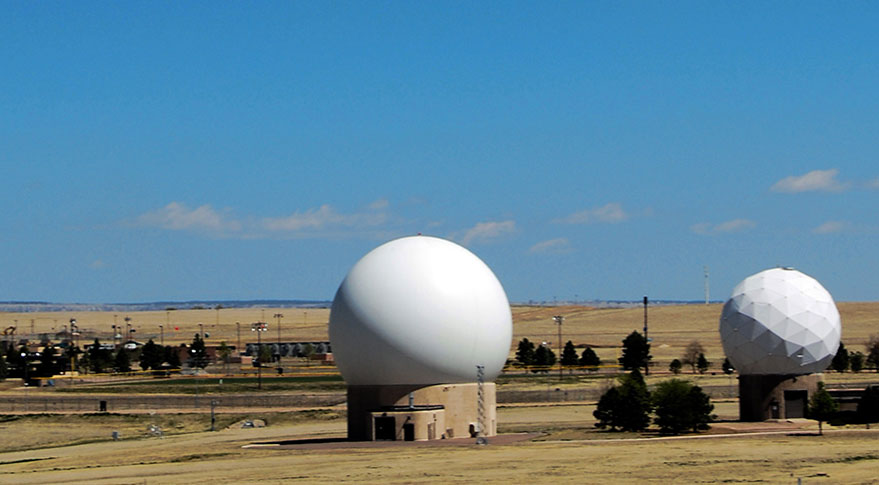
- Radome installations at Schriever

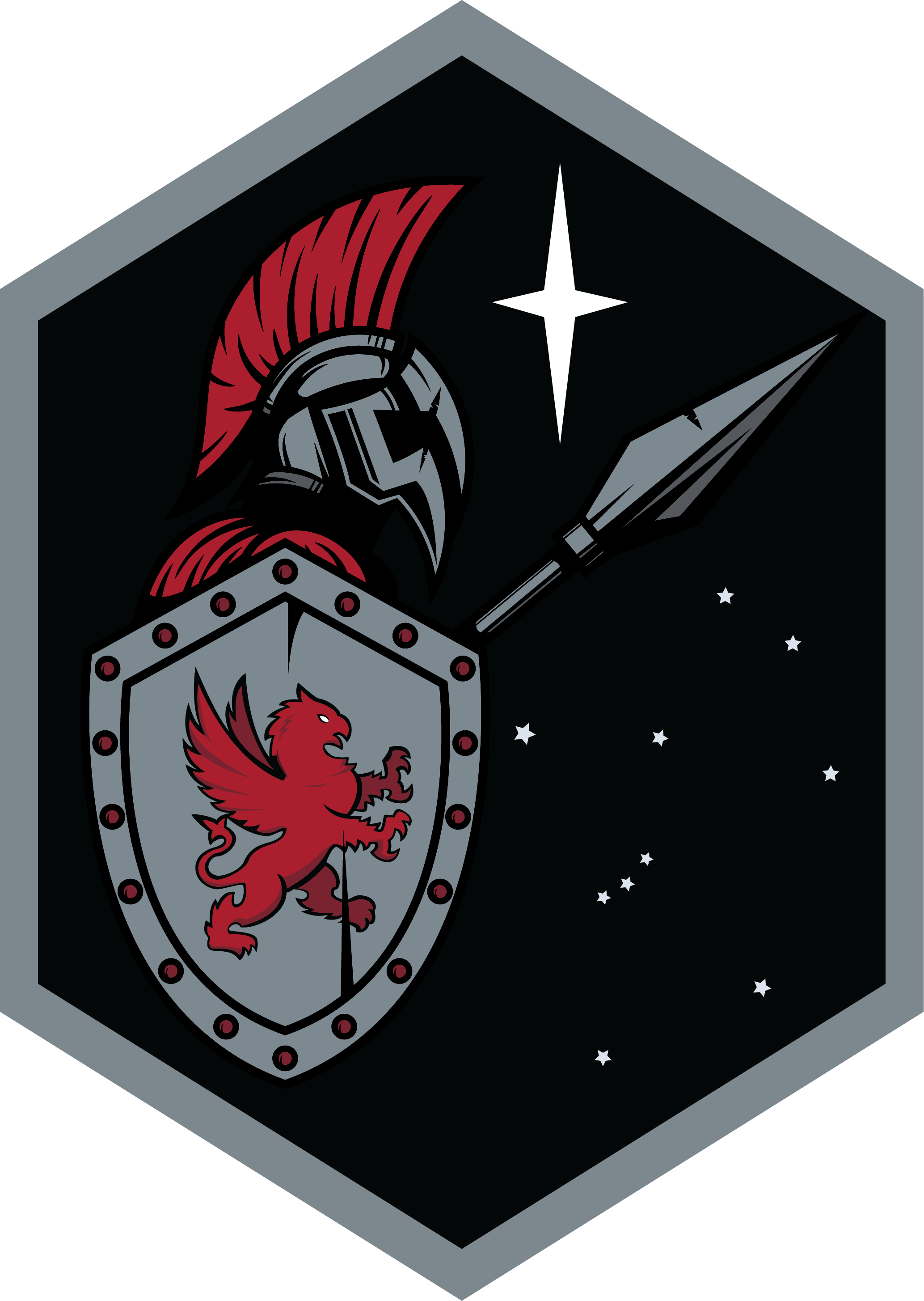
- Shield of Space Base Delta 41

Site information
- Type: U.S. Space Force Base
- Owner: Department of Defense
- Operator: United States Space Force
- Controlled by: Space Base Delta 1
- Condition: Operational
- Website: www.petersonschriever.spaceforce.mil

Location
- Location in the United States
- Coordinates: 38°48′12″N 104°31′32″W

Site history
- Built: 1983–1985 (as Falcon Air Force Station)
- In use: 1985–present

Garrison information
- Current commander: Colonel Kenneth F. L. Klock
- Garrison: Peterson-Schriever Garrison (host)

Schriever Space Force Base, previously Schriever Air Force Base, Falcon Air Force Base, and Falcon Air Force Station, is a base of the United States Space Force located approximately 10 mi (16 km) east of Peterson Space Force Base near Colorado Springs in El Paso County, Colorado, United States.

== History ==
Source: USAF Schriever AFB

Groundbreaking for what would become Schriever Air Force Base took place in May 1983. It was originally called the Consolidated Space Operations Center (CSOC) during the development phase, and was renamed Falcon Air Force Station upon becoming operational. In July 1985, the 2nd Space Wing was activated at Peterson AFB and in September 1985, the organization relocated to Falcon Air Force Station, and 230 Air Force members, civilian employees, and contractors moved into its 12 new buildings. This wing took operational control of the Air Force Satellite Control Network in a phased system turn over that began in October 1987 and lasted several years.

In June 1988, Falcon Air Force Station was redesignated Falcon Air Force Base. On 30 January 1992, the 2nd Space Wing inactivated and the 50th Tactical Fighter Wing, redesignated as the 50th Space Wing, activated at Falcon AFB.

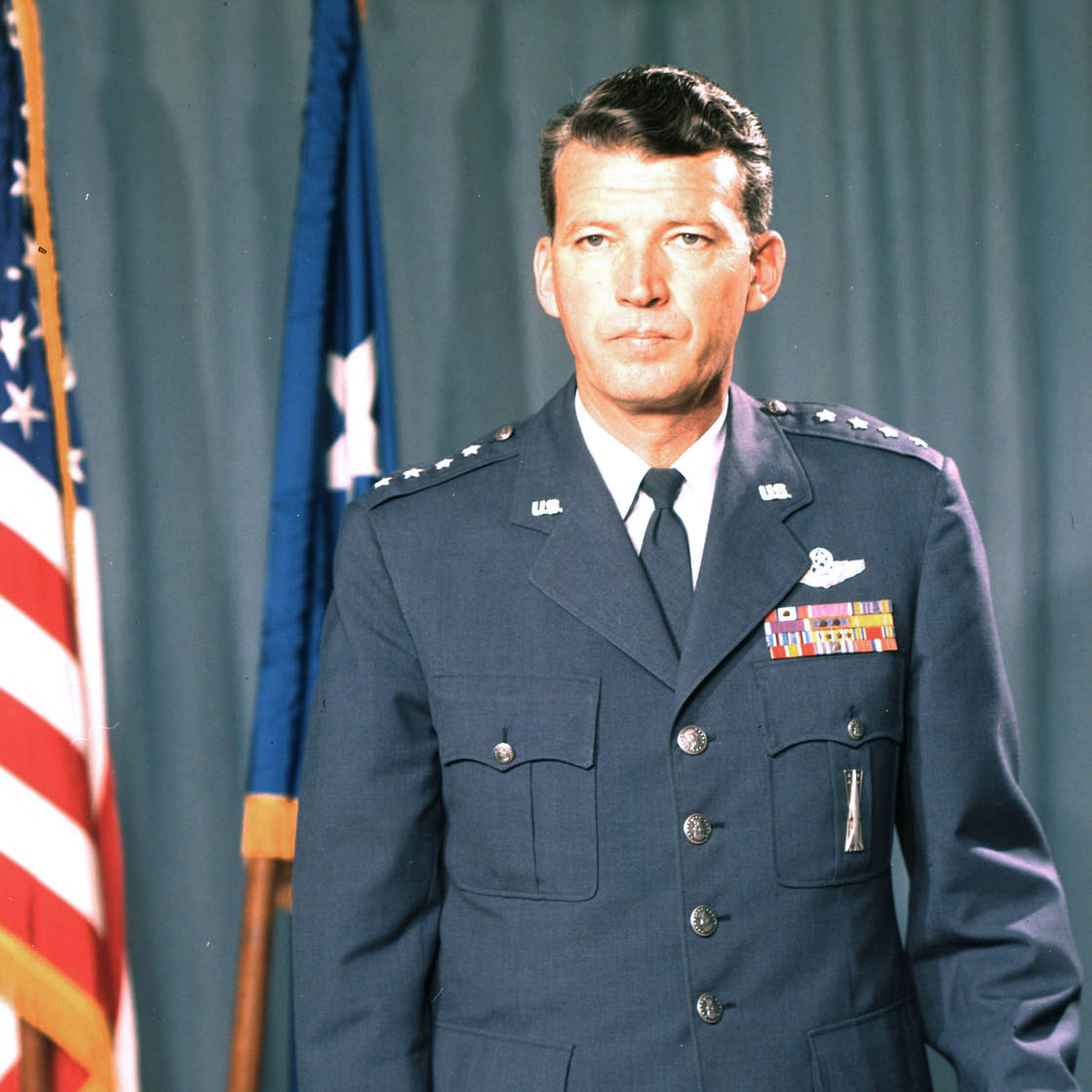
General Bernard Schriever after whom the base is named.

On 5 June 1998, Falcon Air Force Base was renamed Schriever Air Force Base in honor of the retired General Bernard Schriever, who pioneered in the development of the American ballistic missile programs. Schriever AFB was the only Air Force base that was named for an Air Force veteran who was living at the time. General Schriever died 20 June 2005.

On 26 July 2021, the base was renamed Schriever Space Force Base to reflect its role in the new Space Force mission.

On 20 November, 2024, the Department of the Air Force selected Schriever Space Force Base as the location to host Space Delta 15, with 250 manpower authorizations. Space Delta 15 is set to be fully operational in the summer of 2027.

== Role and operations ==
This Space Force Base is named in honor of General Bernard Schriever, who pioneered in the development of the American ballistic missile programs. It is the home of the 50th Space Wing of the United States Space Force, and this base provides command and control for over 170 Department of Defense warning, navigational, and communications satellites.

Also housed at Schriever SFB are the Missile Defense Integration and Operations Center and the U.S. Air Force Warfare Center. Building 400 at Schriever SFB is the main control point for the Global Positioning System (GPS).

Schriever is staffed by more than 8,100 active duty and guard/reserve personnel, civilian employees, and contractors.

== Based units ==
Notable units based at Schriever Space Force Base.

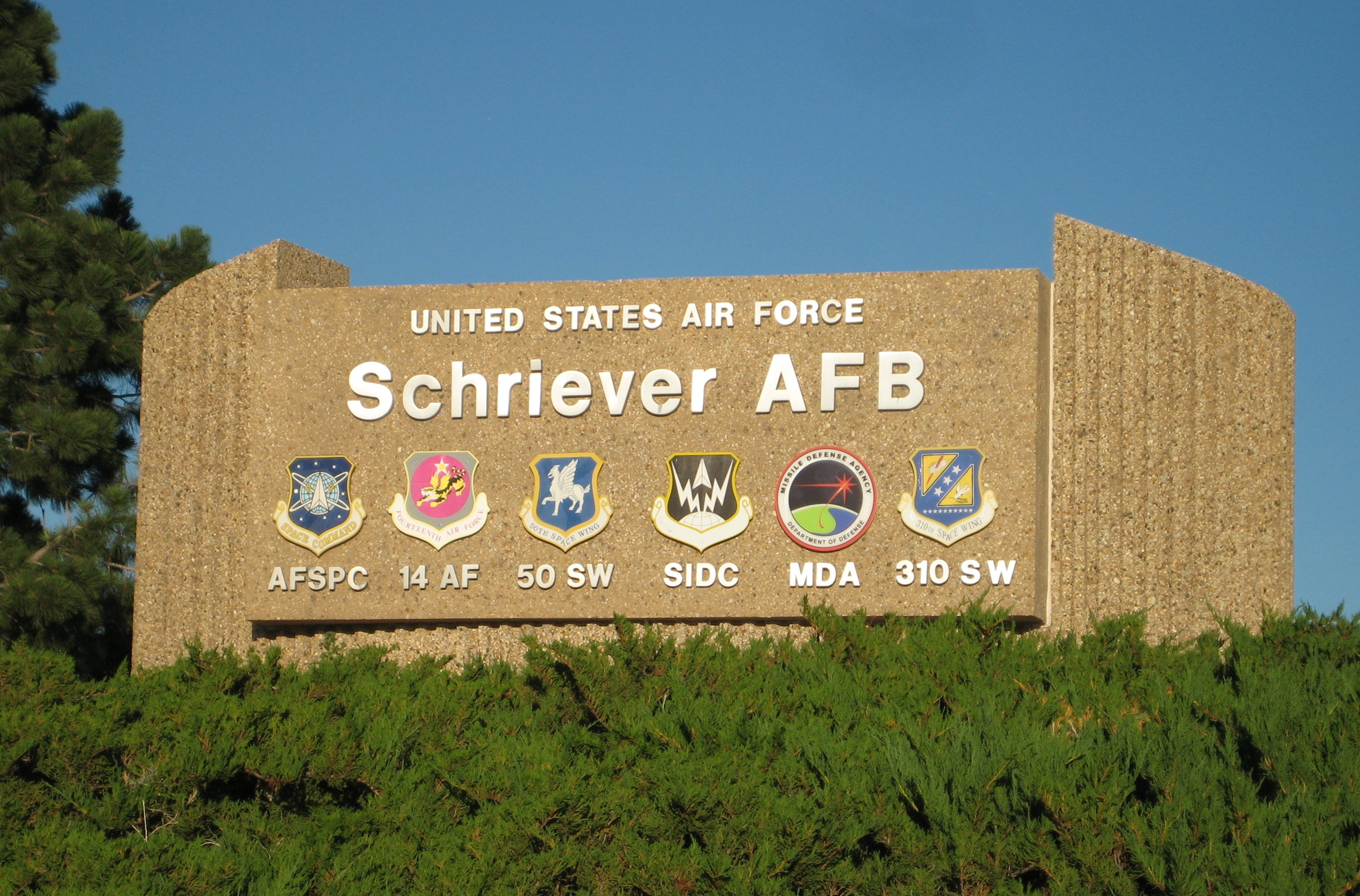
Schriever's old main gate sign with tenant units listed below.

Units marked GSU are Geographically Separate Units, which although based at Schriever, are subordinate to a parent unit based at another location.

=== United States Space Force ===
Space Base Delta 1

- 50th Mission Support Group
  - 50th Civil Engineer Squadron
  - 50th Contracting Squadron
  - 50th Force Support Squadron
  - 50th Logistics Readiness Flight
  - 50th Security Forces Squadron
  - 69th Cyberspace Squadron
- 21st Medical Group
  - 21st Medical Squadron (GSU)

United States Space Force Combat Forces Command (CFC)

- Space Delta 6
  - 1st Cyber Operations Squadron
  - 2nd Cyber Operations Squadron
  - 22nd Space Operations Squadron
  - Combat Training Detachment 1
- Space Delta 8
  - 2nd Space Operations Squadron
  - 4th Space Operations Squadron
  - 8th Combat Training Squadron
  - 10th Space Operations Squadron (GSU)
  - 53rd Space Operations Squadron
  - Satcom Office
- Space Delta 9
  - 1st Space Operations Squadron
  - 3rd Space Operations Squadron
  - Delta 9 Operations Support Squadron
  - Detachment 1
- Mission Delta 31

Space Training and Readiness Command (STARCOM)

- Space Delta 11
  - 25th Space Range Squadron
  - 527th Space Aggressor Squadron
- Space Delta 12
  - 1st Test and Evaluation Squadron
  - 3rd Test and Evaluation Squadron
  - 4th Test and Evaluation Squadron
  - 12th Delta Operations Squadron
  - 17th Test and Evaluation Squadron

=== United States Air Force ===
Air Force Reserve Command (AFRC)

- Tenth Air Force
  - 310th Space Wing
    - Headquarters 310th Space Wing
    - 310th Operations Group
      - 6th Space Operations Squadron
      - 7th Space Operations Squadron
      - 19th Space Operations Squadron
      - 310th Operations Support Squadron
      - 310th Security Forces Squadron
    - 310th Mission Support Group
      - 310th Security Forces Squadron
      - 310th Force Support Squadron
      - 310th Communications Flight
    - 710th Operations Group
      - 8th Space Warning Squadron
        - Detachment 1 (GSU)
  - 926th Wing
    - 926th Operations Group
      - 14th Test Squadron (GSU)
      - 26th Space Aggressor Squadron (GSU)
      - 379th Space Range Squadron (GSU)

=== United States Army ===
Colorado Army National Guard

- 100th Missile Defense Brigade

=== United States Navy ===
US Naval Observatory

- USNO Alternate Master Clock

=== Department of Defense ===
United States Space Command

- Joint Task Force–Space Defense
  - National Space Defense Center

United States Strategic Command

- Joint Functional Component Command for Integrated Missile Defense

=== Missile Defense Agency ===
- Missile Defense Integration and Operations Center

=== National Reconnaissance Office ===
- NRO Operations Squadron

== See also ==
- Communications satellites
- Milstar
- Satellite navigation systems
- SolarStrong
- Space Test and Training Range
