= 14th Test Squadron =

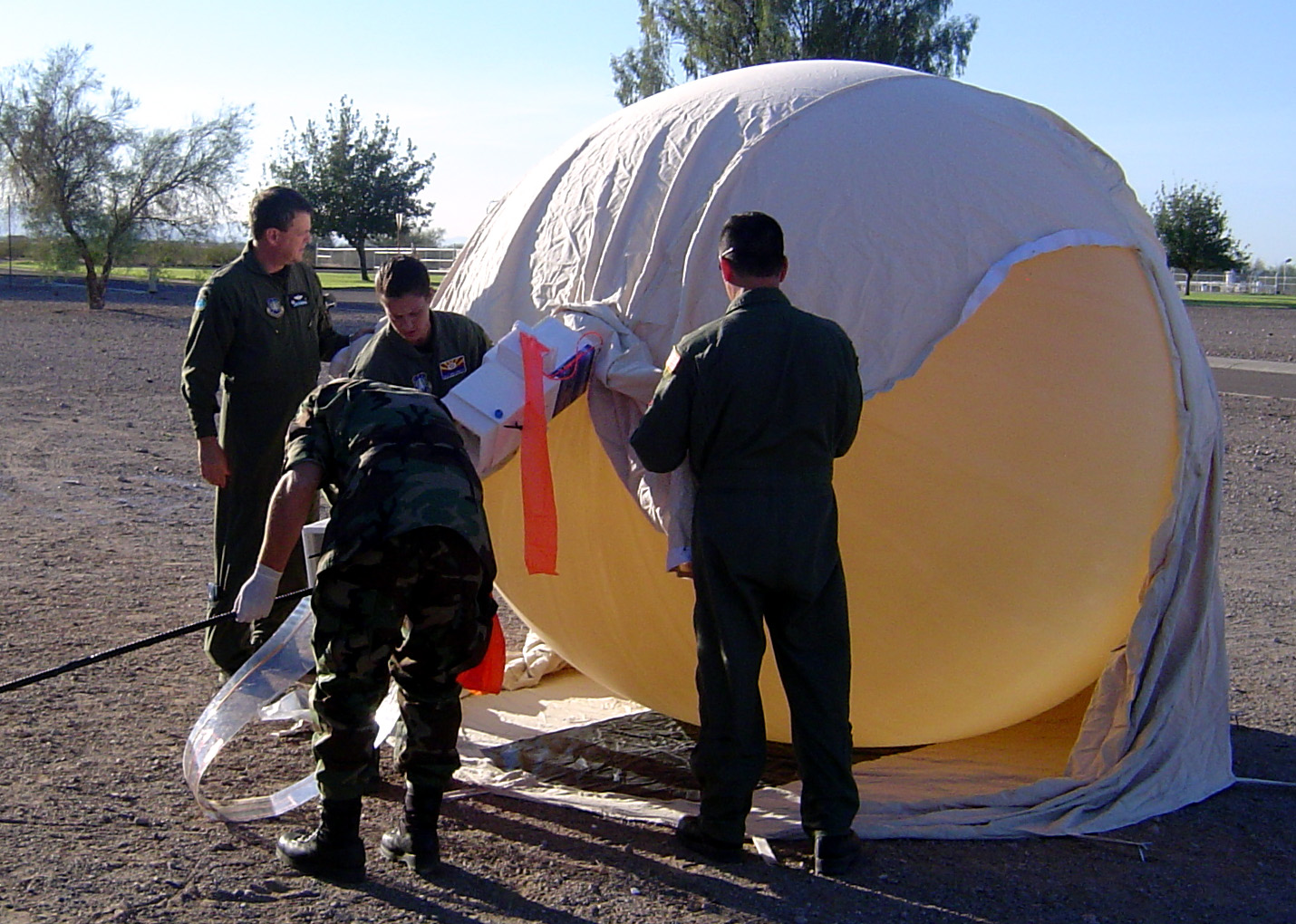
- Joint 14th and 17th Test Squadrons team preparing for a test
- Active: 1972–1980; 2000–present
- Country: United States
- Branch: United States Air Force
- Role: Space systems test and evaluation
- Size: Squadron
- Part of: Air Force Space Command
- Garrison/HQ: Schriever Air Force Base
- Decorations: Air Force Outstanding Unit Award

Insignia
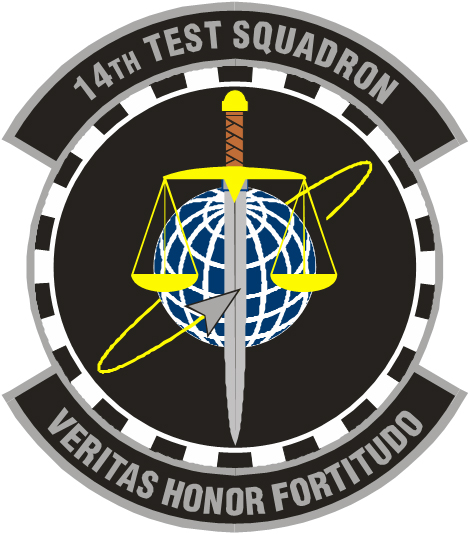
- 14th Test Squadron emblem (approved 2 January 2001)

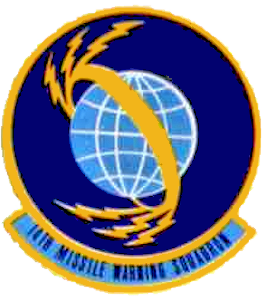
- 14th Missile Warning Squadron emblem

The 14th Test Squadron is a United States Air Force unit located at Schriever Air Force Base, Colorado. It is an Air Force Reserve unit that augments the 17th Test Squadron. The squadron is responsible for testing and evaluating space systems and associated support equipment. The unit was originally established in 1972 as the 14th Missile Warning Squadron. The missile warning squadron was an active duty unit that operated early warning radars at eight locations around the United States until it was inactivated in 1980. The squadron was reactivated and given its current space test mission in 2000.

== Mission ==
=== Cold War ===
The 14th Missile Warning Squadron was constituted on 17 April 1972 and activated on 8 July 1972. The unit was assigned to the Fourteenth Aerospace Force. Its primary mission was detecting and tracking intercontinental ballistic missiles and sea-launched ballistic missiles. The squadron was also responsible for tracking satellites that passed over the United States.

The squadron operated radars at eight geographically separated locations around the United States. The radar sites began operating in the mid-1960s under other command elements, but were brought together into one squadron when the 14th Missile Warning Squadron was established in 1972. Seven of the sited operated the AN/FSS-7 missile warning radar (also known as a Fuzzy-7 radar), a modified version of the AN/FPS-26 height-finder radar. One radar site (Moorestown) operated a prototype AN/FPS-49 missile-warning radar. The 14th Missile Warning Squadron was inactivated in 1980.

=== Today ===
The mission of the 14th Test Squadron is to enhance warfighting capabilities of Air Force Space Command by testing and evaluating space assets. To accomplish this, unit personnel provide long-term continuity and technical expertise to active duty test managers conducting operational tests on new space systems. The squadron also supports specific test operations at Cheyenne Mountain Complex and information assurance testing throughout Air Force Space Command.

== Organization ==
=== Cold War ===
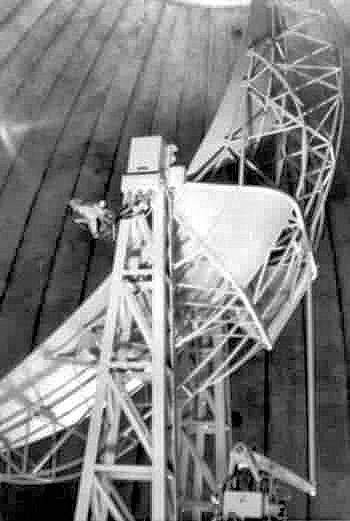
AN/FPS-26 radar inside radome

The 14th Missile Warning Squadron was assigned to the 14th Aerospace Force from 8 July 1972 to 30 September 1976. It was then assigned to Aerospace Defense Command from 1 October 1976 to 30 November 1979. Finally, it was assigned to 42d Air Division of Strategic Air Command from 1 December 1979 until the unit was inactivated on 1 October 1980.

The squadron was originally stationed at Laredo Air Force Base, Texas. It was located there from 8 July 1972 until the base closed 1 January 1974. In 1975, the squadron moved to MacDill Air Force Base, Florida. The squadron was located at MacDill from 30 June 1975 until the unit was inactivated in 1980.

The 14th Missile Warning Squadron's eight detachments were located along the east and west coasts of the United States. The warning radars were at:

- Detachment 1 was located at Moorestown, New Jersey. It was activated on 8 July 1972. The detachment operated AN/FPS-49 prototype radar; maintained by RCA under contract to the Air Force. It was inactivated on 31 March 1975.
- Detachment 2 was located at Mount Hebo Air Force Station, Oregon. It was activated on 8 July 1972. The detachment operated an AN/FPS-26A radar modified to AN/FSS-7 radar. It was inactivated on 15 September 1980.

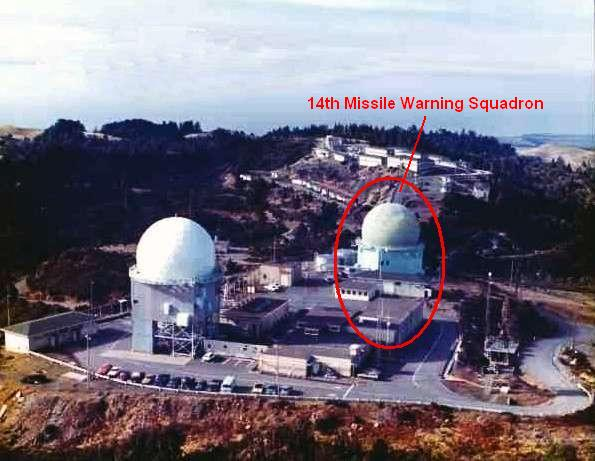
Mill Valley Air Force Station radar facility, 1975

- Detachment 3 was located at Mill Valley Air Force Station, California. It was activated on 8 July 1972. The detachment operated an AN/FPS-26A radar modified to AN/FSS-7 radar. It was inactivated on 15 September 1980.
- Detachment 4 was located at Mount Laguna Air Force Station, California. It was activated on 8 July 1972. the detachment operated an AN/FPS-26A radar modified to AN/FSS-7 radar. It was discontinued on 15 September 1980.
- Detachment 5 was located at Fort Fisher Air Force Station, North Carolina. It was activated on 8 July 1972. The detachment operated an AN/FPS-26A radar modified to AN/FSS-7 radar. It was discontinued on 1 July 1980.
- Detachment 6 was located at Charleston Air Force Station, Maine. It was activated on 8 July 1972. The detachment operated an AN/FPS-26A radar modified to AN/FSS-7 radar. It was discontinued on 1 July 1980.
- Detachment 7 was located at MacDill Air Force Base, Florida. It was activated on 8 July 1972. The detachment operated an AN/FPS-26A radar modified to AN/FSS-7 radar. It was discontinued on 31 August 1980.
- Detachment 8 was located at Laredo Missile Tracking Site, Texas. It was activated on 8 July 1972. The detachment operated an AN/FSS-7 radar which was installed in its final configuration. The radar was not modified from a previously installed AN/FPS-26. It was discontinued on 30 June 1975.

=== Today ===
The 14th Test Squadron is an Air Force Reserve squadron. Its personnel augment the 17th Test Squadron, its active duty counterpart unit. The two units cooperate on many test and evaluation efforts, providing senior Air Force leaders with an independent assessment of new space systems. Since the acquisition process for space systems can take several years, reservists from the 14th Test Squadron provide program continuity. Reservists also bring unique expertise and extensive experience to complex test and evaluation programs they support.

The squadron has three flights that provide operational test and evaluation support to Air Force Space Command and major commands.

- The Weapons and Surveillance Flight is located at Cheyenne Mountain Air Force Station, Colorado. Its personnel test the Integrated Tactical Warning and Attack Assessment System, which provides real-time threat information to the National Command Authority. This flight directly supports the homeland defense mission of North American Aerospace Defense Command and the United States Northern Command.
- The Information Assurance Flight is located at Schriever Air Force Base, Colorado. The flight conducts information assurance assessments of space systems. Its personnel use their expertise in networking, operating systems, databases, and information assurance controls to identify space system vulnerabilities for Air Force Space Command units.
- The Evaluation and Assessment Flight is located at Schriever Air Force Base. It supports rapid delivery of new space systems. The flight uses innovative non-traditional management techniques to help expedite the delivery of space assets.

== Redesignation ==
On 1 October 2000, the Air Force reactivated the unit as the 14th Test Squadron. The mission of the 14th Test Squadron is to test and evaluate of space assets for Air Force Space Command. To accomplish this, unit personnel provide long-term continuity and technical expertise to active duty test managers conducting operational tests on new space systems. The squadron also supports specific test operations at Cheyenne Mountain Complex.

The 14th Test Squadron is an Air Force Reserve squadron. The unit supports its active duty counterpart, the 17th Test Squadron. The two units cooperate on many test efforts, providing senior Air Force leaders with an independent assessment of new space systems. Since the acquisition process for space systems can take several years, reservists from the 14th Test Squadron provide continuity to long-term test and evaluation programs.

The 14th Test Squadron is located at Schriever Air Force Base, Colorado. The squadron is assigned to the 310th Operations Group. The squadron has three flights. The Weapons and Surveillance Flight is located at Cheyenne Mountain Air Force Station, Colorado. Its personnel test the Integrated Tactical Warning and Attack Assessment System, which provides real-time threat information to the National Command Authority. The Information Assurance Flight is located at Schriever Air Force Base. The flight conducts information assurance assessments of space systems. Its personnel use their expertise in networking, operating systems, databases, and information assurance controls to identify space system vulnerabilities for Air Force Space Command. The Evaluation and Assessment Flight is also located at Schriever Air Force Base. It supports rapid delivery of new space systems. The flight uses non-traditional management techniques to help expedite the delivery of space assets.

== Lineage ==
- Constituted as the 14th Missile Warning Squadron on 17 April 1972

Activated on 8 July 1972
Inactivated on 1 October 1980

- Redesignated 14th Test Squadron on 10 March 2000

Activated on 1 October 2000

=== Assignments ===
- Fourteenth Aerospace Force, 8 July 1972
- Aerospace Defense Command, 1 October 1976
- 42d Air Division, 1 December 1979 – 1 October 1980
- 310th Space Group, 1 October 2000
- 310th Operations Group 7 March 2008 – present

=== Stations ===
- Laredo Air Force Base, Texas, 8 July 1972
- Laredo, Texas, 1 January 1974
- MacDill Air Force Base, Florida, 30 June 1975 – 1 October 1980
- Schriever Air Force Base, Colorado, 1 October 2000 – present

=== Awards ===
Award streamer	Award	Dates	Notes
	Air Force Outstanding Unit Award	1 July 1974 – 1 April 1976	14th Missile Warning Squadron
	Air Force Outstanding Unit Award	2 April 1976 – 1 April 1978	14th Missile Warning Squadron
	Air Force Outstanding Unit Award	2 April 1978 – 30 June 1979	14th Missile Warning Squadron
	Air Force Outstanding Unit Award	1 October 2000 – 30 September 2002	14th Test Squadron
	Air Force Outstanding Unit Award	1 October 2002 – 30 July 2004	14th Test Squadron
	Air Force Outstanding Unit Award	1 August 2004 – 31 July 2006	14th Test Squadron
	Air Force Outstanding Unit Award	1 September 2004 – 31 August 2005	14th Test Squadron
	Air Force Outstanding Unit Award	1 September 2005 – 31 August 2006	14th Test Squadron
	Air Force Outstanding Unit Award	1 August 2006 – 31 July 2008	14th Test Squadron
	Air Force Outstanding Unit Award	1 September 2006 – 31 August 2007	14th Test Squadron

== See also ==
- 17th Test Squadron – Active duty counterpart to 14th Test Squadron
- Mount Hebo Air Force Station – Detachment location
- Mill Valley Air Force Station – Detachment location
- Mount Laguna Air Force Station – Detachment location
- Fort Fisher Air Force Station – Detachment location
- Charleston Air Force Station – Detachment location
- United States general surveillance radar stations
