= 65th Cyberspace Squadron =

U.S. Space Force unit

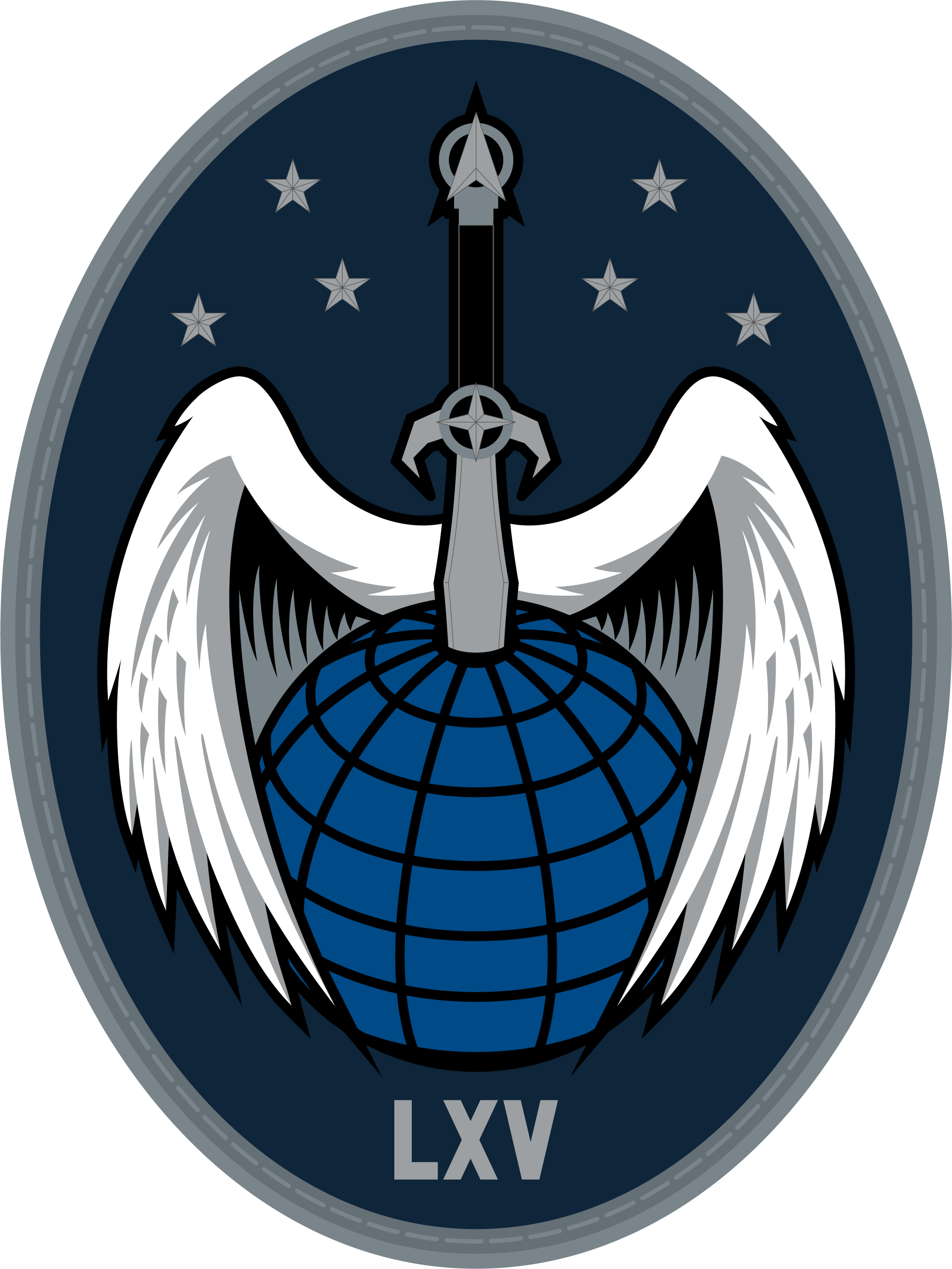
- 65 CYS emblem
- Active: 14 April 1942–12 January 1943; 23 January 2004–present
- Country: United States
- Branch: United States Space Force
- Type: Squadron
- Role: Cyber operations
- Part of: Space Delta 6
- Headquarters: Vandenberg Space Force Base, California, U.S.

Commanders
- Commander: Lt Col Jacob Majewski

Insignia
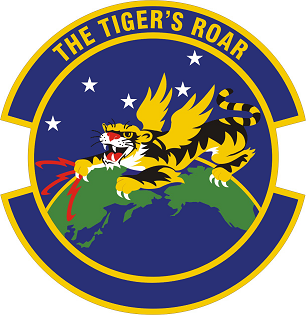
- 614th Air and Space Communications Squadron emblem

The 65th Cyberspace Squadron (65 CYS) is a United States Space Force unit responsible for defending the computer systems and networks used by Space Delta 5 and the Combined Space Operations Center against adversary actions in cyberspace. It was previously the 614th Air and Space Communications Squadron.

== List of commanders ==
- Lt Col Robert Thompson, ??? – 9 July 2013
- Lt Col Timothy Ryan, 9 July 2013 – ???
- Lt Col Jontae McGrew, ??? – 23 June 2021
- Lt Col Jason Thompson, 23 June 2021 – 21 July 2023
- Lt Col Jacob Majewski, 21 July 2023 – present

== See also ==
- Space Delta 6
