= Combat Training Detachment 1 =

United States Space Force Cyber Training Unit

Space Delta 6 Combat Training Detachment 1
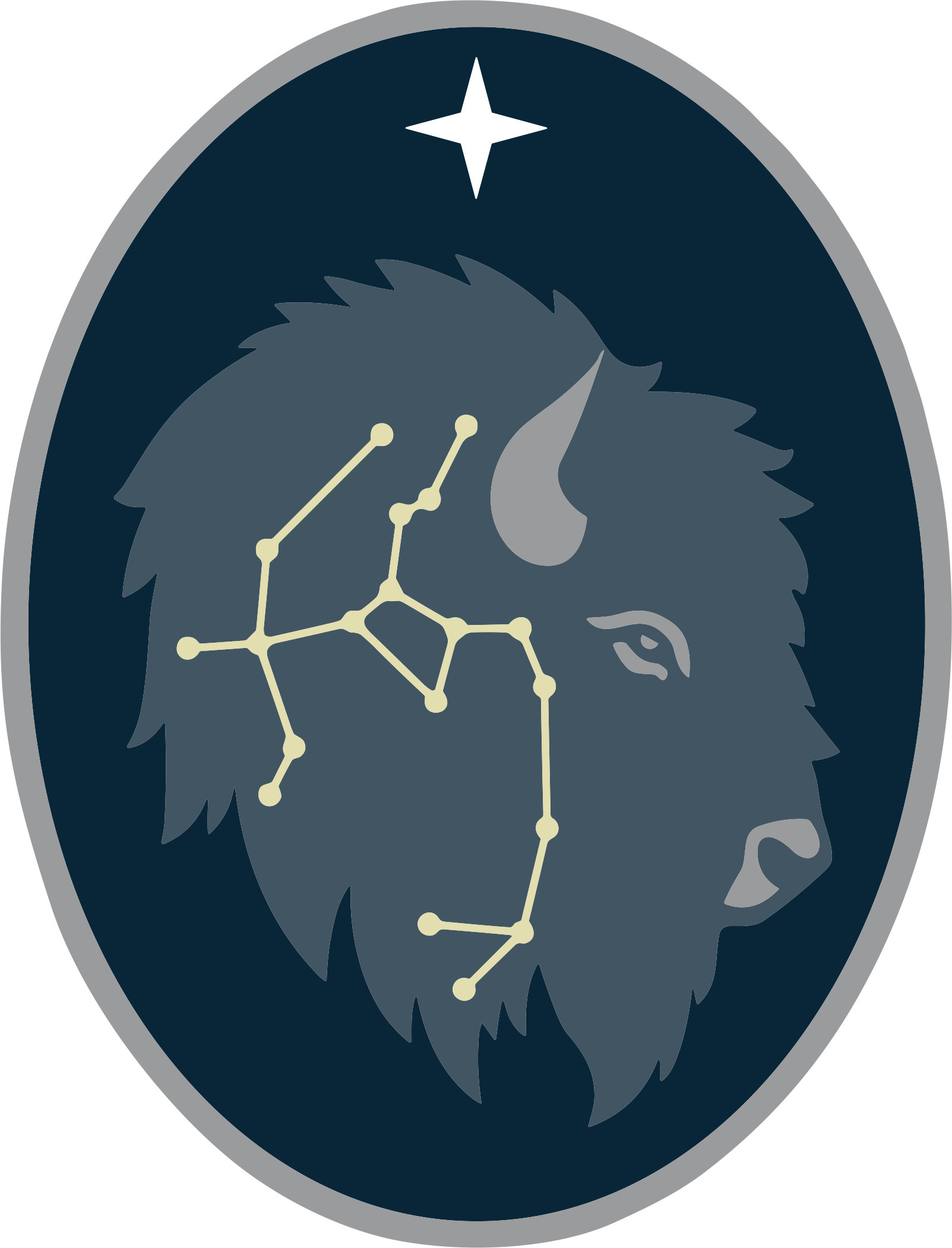
- Det 1 Emblem
- Active: 2023–present
- Country: United States
- Branch: United States Space Force
- Type: Cyber Operations Training
- Part of: Space Delta 6
- Garrison/HQ: Schriever Space Force Base, Colorado, U.S.
- Motto: "Fight Ready"

Space Delta 6 Combat Training Detachment 1 (CTD 1), the Capybaras, were a unit of the United States Space Force assigned to Space Delta 6. Based at Schriever Space Force Base in Colorado, the detachment specializes in cyber training, focusing on preparing Space Force Guardians to operate and defend critical space-based and terrestrial systems. CTD 1 develops advanced cyber operations capabilities, enhancing the Space Force's ability to conduct defensive and offensive cyber missions in support of U.S. national security objectives.

== History ==
CTD 1 was activated in 2023 to fulfill a critical gap in the Space Force’s ability to produce mission-ready cyber operators. As the first unit of its kind under Space Delta 6, CTD 1’s mission is to design, develop, and deliver specialized cyber training tailored for Space Force Guardians who defend vital space and cyberspace assets.

The flagship training pipeline developed by CTD 1 is the Cyber Combat Course (C3), a 15-week, self-paced program structured into two distinct phases. The first phase focuses on red team (offensive) cyber operations, while the second addresses blue team (defensive) cyber tactics. Each phase concludes with a capstone exercise designed to integrate skills learned and test operational readiness. Graduates also earn industry-recognized certifications, reinforcing the operational credibility of the course.

Since its first cohort on 20 June 2023, C3 has graduated more than 277 cyber operators across more than 22 separate course sessions, supported by a cadre of 22 instructors. CTD 1 rapidly grew into a recognized hub for elite cyber training, addressing Space Force priorities in contested, degraded, and operationally limited (CDO) environments.

On 1 July 2024, CTD 1 transitioned the Cyber Combat Course to the 533d Training Squadron (533d Training Squadron) under Space Training and Readiness Command (STARCOM), marking a shift toward institutionalized cyber training at a service-wide level. Despite the transition, CTD 1 continues to innovate in tactical and advanced cyber curriculum development.

Headquartered at Schriever Space Force Base, Colorado, CTD 1 is strategically positioned within the Space Operations Command and Training and Readiness Command enterprise. It remains a cornerstone in generating combat-ready cyber Guardians, capable of defending U.S. interests in space and cyberspace.

Initially, CTD 1 was slated to become the 60th Cyberspace Training Squadron (60 CTS), further reflecting the importance and scale originally envisioned for the detachment.

== Cyber Combat Course (C3) ==
Duration: 15 weeks

Structure: Two phases — red team (offensive) and blue team (defensive) cyber operations

Features:

- Self-paced instruction
- Capstone projects
- Industry-recognized certifications awarded

Graduates: 277 (over 22 course sessions)
