= Space Delta 6 =

U.S. Space Force cyberspace operations unit

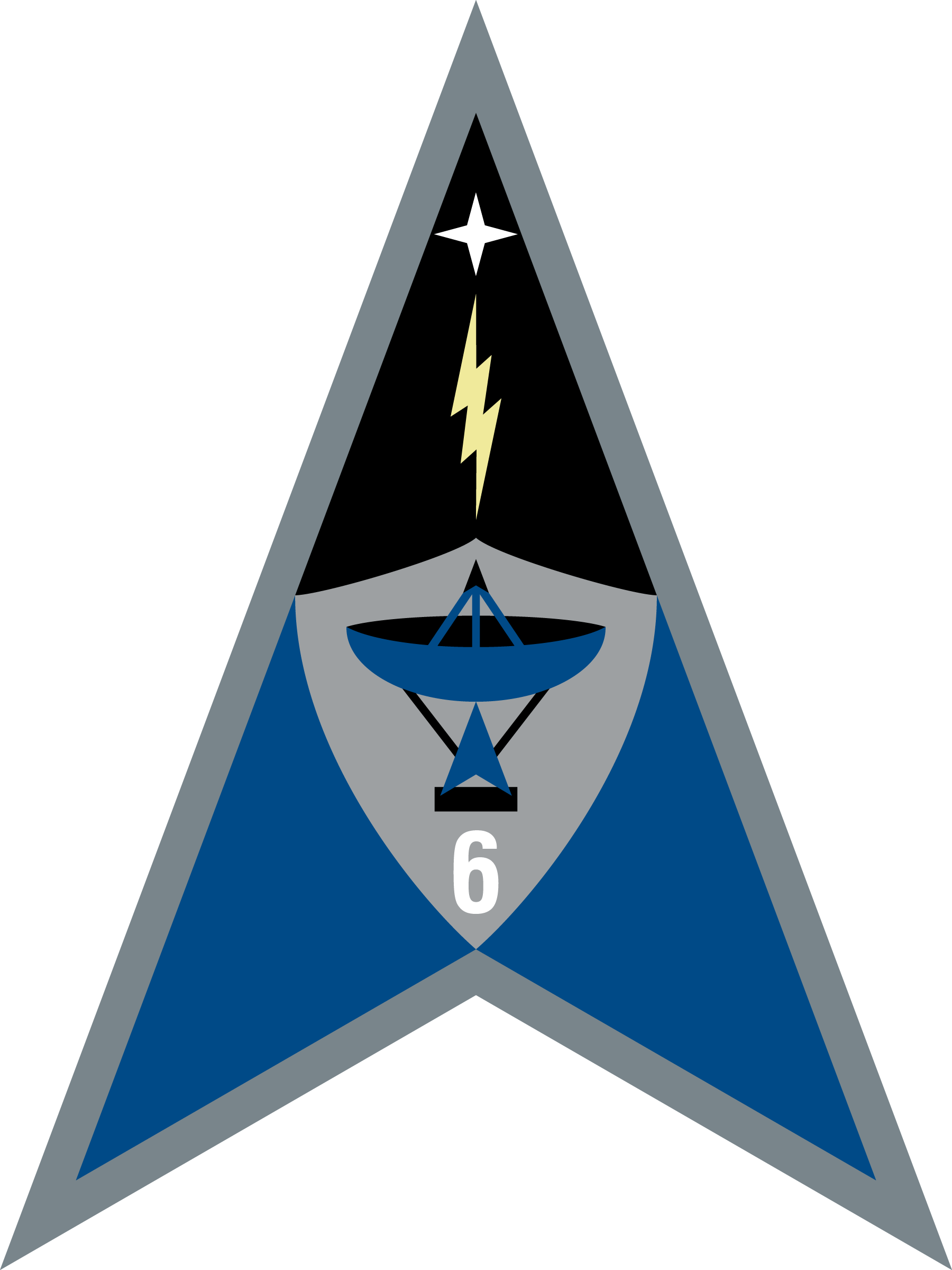
- Delta emblem
- Founded: 24 July 2020; 5 years ago
- Country: United States
- Branch: United States Space Force
- Type: Delta
- Role: Cyberspace operations
- Size: More than 1,200 personnel
- Part of: United States Space Force Combat Forces Command
- Headquarters: Schriever Space Force Base, Colorado, U.S.
- Website: www.schriever.spaceforce.mil/Units/Space-Delta-6/

Commanders
- Commander: Col Maxwell E. Fuldauer
- Vice Commander: Lt Col Justin Roque
- Deputy Director: Shane Swenson
- Senior Enlisted Leader: CMSgt Joseph E. Laughlin Jr.
- Notable commanders: Col Roy V. Rockwell

Insignia
- Space Delta 6 guidon

Space Delta 6 (DEL 6) is a United States Space Force unit which assures access to space through the $6.8 billion Satellite Control Network and defensive cyberspace capabilities for space mission systems.

Tracing its history to 1965, the delta is headquartered at Schriever Space Force Base, Colorado. It replaced the 50th Network Operations Group, which had been part of the former 50th Space Wing. On 23 June 2021, the 614th Air and Space Communications Squadron, previously under Space Delta 5, was redesignated as the 65th Cyber Squadron and transferred into Space Delta 6.

== History ==
The delta was first organized as the 1879th Communications Squadron during the Vietnam War in 1965. It formed part of the 1964th Communications Group providing communications for the U.S. Air Force in South Vietnam. In 1971, as American participation in the Vietnam War was reduced and United States Air Force closed down its activities at Nha Trang Air Base, the squadron was moved to Richards-Gebaur Air Force Base, Missouri, where it absorbed the mission, personnel and equipment of the 2009th Communications Squadron, which was inactivated.

The unit moved to its present location, then named Falcon Air Force Station, when Richards-Gebaur was turned over to the Air Force Reserve. The 1879th assumed the resources of the 2184th Communications Squadron at Falcon. When the 2d Space Wing was inactivated in 1992 the 1879th was inactivated with it and its mission was taken over by the 50th Satellite Communications Squadron.

The expanded space communications mission at Schriever Air Force Base led to the activation of the unit, now designated the 50th Communications Group. In 2002 the group was inactivated and its components transferred to the 50th Maintenance Group. This action was reversed less than a year later.

In March 2004 the group was re-designated the 50th Network Operations Group, and took control of the 21st, 22nd, and 23rd Space Operations Squadrons to consolidate control of the Air Force Satellite Control Network (AFSCN).

The 50th Network Operations Group was re-designated as Delta 6 on July 24, 2020.

=== Structure in 2020 ===
- 21st Space Operations Squadron (21 SOPS), Vandenberg Air Force Base
  - Detachment 1, 21st Space Operations Squadron, Naval Support Facility Diego Garcia
  - Detachment 2, 21st Space Operations Squadron, Andersen Air Force Base
  - Detachment 3, 21st Space Operations Squadron, Kaena Point Satellite Tracking Station
- 22nd Space Operations Squadron (22 SOPS)
- 23rd Space Operations Squadron (23 SOPS), New Boston Air Force Station
  - Detachment 1, 23rd Space Operations Squadron, Thule Air Base
  - OL-A, 23rd Space Operations Squadron, RAF Oakhanger
- 50th Space Communications Squadron (50 SCS)

== Emblem symbolism ==
Space Delta 6's emblem consists of the following elements:

- The platinum border represents the foundation and structure Space Operations Command provides to Space Delta 6.
- The midnight blue represents the determination and tenacity of Guardians.
- The North Star represents the satellite systems that Space Delta 6 supports.
- The lightning bolt represents instantaneous response by each unique operational space mission for Space Delta 6.
- The shield and satellite dish symbolizes missions that Space Delta 6 is responsible for: Space Control Network and Cyber Defense.
- The number six signifies Space Delta 6's number and the ability to support the warfighting domain.

== Structure ==
Emblem	Name	Function	Headquarters	Cyberspace systems	Detachments
Squadrons
	21st Space Operations Squadron	Pacific Satellite Control Network operations, Global Positioning System ground infrastructure, Western Range launch support, and defensive cyber operations	Vandenberg Space Force Base, California	Satellite Control Network	Detachment 1: Naval Support Facility Diego Garcia, British Indian Ocean Territory; Detachment 2: Joint Region Marianas, Guam; Kaena Point Air Force Station, Hawaii; Operating Location: Ronald Reagan Ballistic Missile Defense Test Site, Marshall Islands
	22nd Space Operations Squadron	Satellite Control Network command and control	Schriever Space Force Base, Colorado	Satellite Control Network	
	23rd Space Operations Squadron	Atlantic Satellite Control Network operations, Global Positioning System ground infrastructure, and Eastern Range launch support	New Boston Space Force Station, New Hampshire	Satellite Control Network	Detachment 1: Pituffik Space Base, Greenland; Operating Location: RAF Ascension Island, Saint Helena, Ascension and Tristan da Cunha; Operating Location: RAF Oakhanger, United Kingdom; Operating Location: Patrick Space Force Base, Florida
	62nd Cyberspace Squadron	Defensive cyber operations	Peterson Space Force Base, Colorado		
	64th Cyberspace Squadron	Defensive cyber operations supporting Mission Delta 4	Buckley Space Force Base, Colorado		
	65th Cyberspace Squadron	Defensive cyber operations	Vandenberg Space Force Base, California		
	68th Cyberspace Squadron	Defensive cyber operations supporting Delta 8	Schriever Space Force Base, Colorado		
	69th Cyberspace Squadron	Defensive cyber operations supporting Delta 9	Schriever Space Force Base, Colorado		
	645th Cyberspace Squadron	Defensive cyber operations supporting Space Launch Delta 45 and the Eastern Range	Patrick Space Force Base, Florida		
	Combat Training Detachment 1	Cyber Training	Schriever Space Force Base, Colorado		

== Lineage ==
- Designated 1879th Communications Squadron and organized on 1 November 1965

Redesignated 1879th Information Systems Squadron on 1 July 1985
Redesignated 1879th Communications Squadron on 1 November 1986
Redesignated 1879th Communications Group on 1 October 1989
Inactivated 30 January 1992

- Redesignated 50th Communications Group on 26 November 1997

Activated 1 December 1997
Inactivated 1 October 2002

- Activated 1 June 2003

Redesignated 50th Network Operations Group on 10 March 2004
Redesignated as Space Delta 6 on 24 July 2020

=== Assignments ===
- 1964th Communications Group, 1 November 1965
- Northern Communications Area, 1 September 1971
- Airlift Communications Division, 1 June 1981
- Tactical Communications Division (later, Tactical Information Systems Division), 1 October 1982
- Space Communications Division (later Space Information Systems Division, Space Communications Division), 1 October 1984
- 2d Space Wing, 1 October 1990 – 30 January 1992
- 50th Space Wing, 1 December 1997 – 1 October 2002
- 50th Space Wing, 1 June 2003 – 2020
- Space Operations Command, 2020–Present

=== Stations ===
- Nha Trang Airport (later Nha Trang Air Base), South Vietnam, 1 November 1965
- Richards-Gebaur Air Force Base, Missouri, 1 September 1971
- Falcon Air Force Station (later Falcon Air Force Base), Colorado, 1 October 1984 – 30 January 1992
- Falcon Air Force Base (later Schriever Air Force Base), Colorado, 1 December 1997 – 1 October 2002
- Schriever Air Force Base (later Schriever Space Force Base), Colorado, 1 June 2003 – present

=== Honors and campaigns ===
Campaign streamers

Vietnam:

- Vietnam Defensive 1965–1966
- Vietnam Air 1966
- Vietnam Air Offensive 1966–1967
- Vietnam Air Offensive, Phase II 1967–1968
- Vietnam Air/Ground 1968
- Vietnam Air Offensive, Phase III 1968
- Vietnam Air Offensive, Phase IV 1968–1969
- Tet 69/Counteroffensive 1969
- Vietnam Summer/Fall 1969
- Vietnam Winter/Spring 1969–1970
- Sanctuary Counteroffensive 1970
- Southwest Monsoon 1970
- Commando Hunt V 1970–1971
- Commando Hunt VI 1971

Decorations

- Vietnam Presidential Unit Citation: 21 June 1968 – 30 June 1969

- Republic of Vietnam Gallantry Cross with Palm: 1 April 1966 – 1 September 1971; 1 January – 30 August 1968

- Air Force Outstanding Unit Awards with Combat "V" Device: 1 July 1965 – 30 June 1966; 1 July 1966 – 30 June 1967; 1 July 1967 – 30 June 1968; 1 July 1968 – 30 June 1969; 1 July 1969 – 30 June 1970; 1 July 1970 – 30 June 1971; 1 July 1971 – 1 August 1971

- Air Force Outstanding Unit Awards: 1 September 1971 – 15 April 1972; 1 January 1976 – 31 December 1976; 1 September 1990 – 31 August 1991; 1 October 1998 – 30 September 2000; 1 October 2000 – 1 October 2001; 1 October 2001 – 1 October 2002; 2 October 2002 – 1 October 2003

Other awards

- Major General Harold M. McClelland Award

2007 (50th Space Wing level)
2008 (AFSPC level)
2009 (14th Air Force level)

== List of commanders ==
- Unknown, 1 November 1965 – 1 October 1985
- Lt Col Robert W. Alexander, 1 October 1985 – 18 July 1988
- Col William A. Sample, 19 July 1988 – 1 August 1990
- Lt Col Roman Synychak, 2 August 1990 – 30 January 1992
- Col Gregory S. Hollister, 1 December 1997 – 24 March 1998
- Col Paul F. Capasso, 25 March 1998 – 13 April 2000
- Col David B. Warner, 14 April 2000 – 27 June 2002
- Col Earl D. Matthews, 28 June 2002 – 13 June 2004
- Col David C. Uhrich, 14 June 2004 – 10 July 2006
- Col Robert J. Skinner, 10 July 2006 – 13 July 2008
- Col Mitchel Butikofer, 14 July 2008 – 14 May 2010
- Col Michael Finn II, 14 May 2010 – 4 April 2012
- Col Jonathan Sutherland, 4 April 2012 – 2 June 2014
- Col Jason Sutton, 2 June 2014 – 23 June 2016
- Col W. Scott Angerman, 23 June 2016 – 29 June 2018
- Col Hewett Wells, 29 June 2018 – 16 June 2020
- Col Roy V. Rockwell, 16 June 2020 – 24 July 2020
- Col Roy V. Rockwell, 24 July 2020 - 24 July 2020

=== Space Delta 6 ===
No.	Commander		Term			Ref
No.	Portrait	Name	Took office	Left office	Duration	Ref
1	Roy V. Rockwell	Colonel; Roy V. Rockwell	24 July 2020	9 September 2022	2 years, 47 days	
2	Christopher A. Kennedy	Colonel; Christopher A. Kennedy	9 September 2022	23 August 2024	1 year, 349 days	
3	Travis R. Prater	Colonel; Travis R. Prater	23 August 2024	15 June 2026	1 year, 296 days	
4	Maxwell E. Fuldauer	Colonel; Maxwell E. Fuldauer	15 June 2026	Incumbent	5 days	-
