= Peacock Flats =

Popular camping region in Hawaii

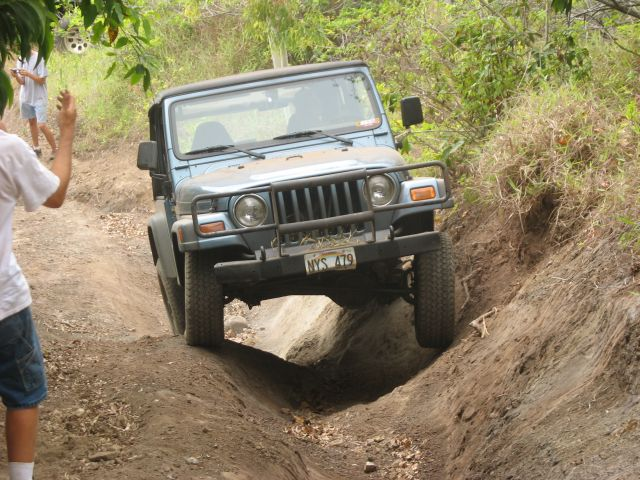
A stock Jeep Wrangler navigates Jeep Eater, one of the trails at the Flats

Peacock Flats is a pair of camp sites located in the Waianae Range on the west side of Oahu, Hawaii. It is part of the Kuaokala Forest Reserve and is accessible via the Kuaokala trail.

== Geography ==
Peacock Flats is accessible only to four-wheel drive vehicles. It is popular with many of the off-roading clubs on the island and offers both easy and challenging trails over rocks and steep, deeply rutted trails. The condition of the trails vary greatly with the weather. When wet, the trails are slippery, very treacherous, and almost impassable, however, when dry they can be almost tame.

At the top of the main trail is a camping area (visitors intending to camp must notate that on their permit) with picnic tables and an outhouse. Hikers, mountain bikers, and horseback riders share the trails.

== Access ==
Access to Peacock Flats is via the gate at the Kaena Point Satellite Tracking Station across from Yokohama Bay (also known as Keawaʻula Bay). This is a U.S. Space Force installation so visitors must get a permit for their vehicle from the State Department of Land and Natural Resources. The road is occasionally closed when the military raises security levels.
