= 17th Test and Evaluation Squadron =

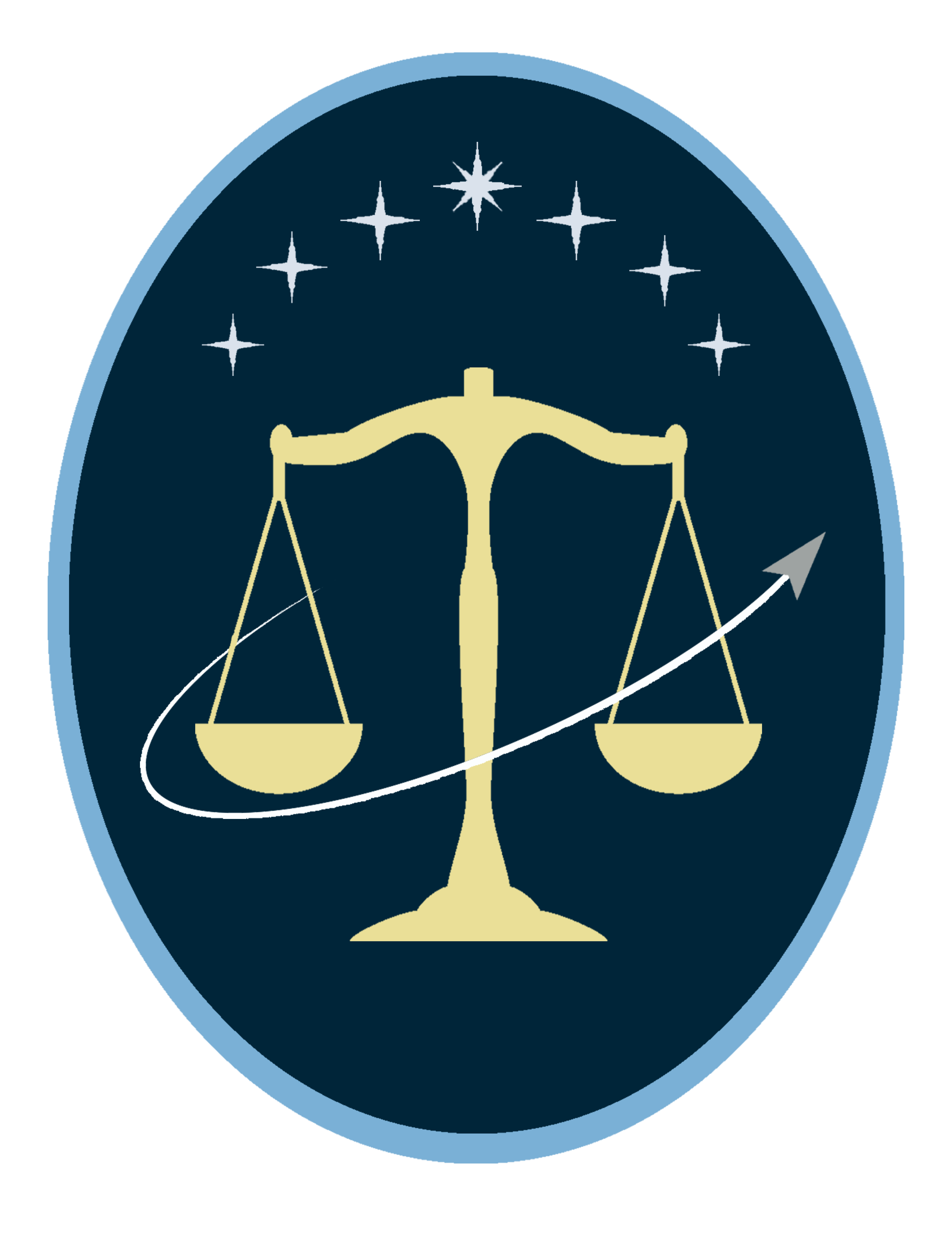
- Squadron emblem
- Active: 6 April 1990 – 15 October 1992; 12 July 1995 – present
- Country: United States
- Branch: United States Space Force
- Type: Space operations
- Role: Test and evaluation
- Part of: Space Delta 12
- Home base: Schriever Space Force Base, Colorado
- Mottos: Ex scientia vera (Latin for 'From knowledge, truth')
- Decorations: Air Force Outstanding Unit Award; Air Force Organizational Excellence Award
- Website: Official website

Commanders
- Current commander: Lt Col Jon R. Anderson

The 17th Test and Evaluation Squadron is a United States Space Force test and evaluation unit, located at Schriever Space Force Base, Colorado. The squadron is tasked with testing and evaluating space systems and associated support equipment.

== History ==
On 6 April 1990, at Peterson Air Force Base Colorado the 1017th Test and Evaluation Squadron was activated. The mission of the 1017th was to perform Air Staff-directed initial and follow-on operational test and evaluation of Air Force Space Command (AFSPC) space surveillance, missile warning, and command and control systems. The squadron oversaw two operating locations at Falcon Air Force Base and Buckley Air National Guard Base. The unit inactivated on 15 October 1992.

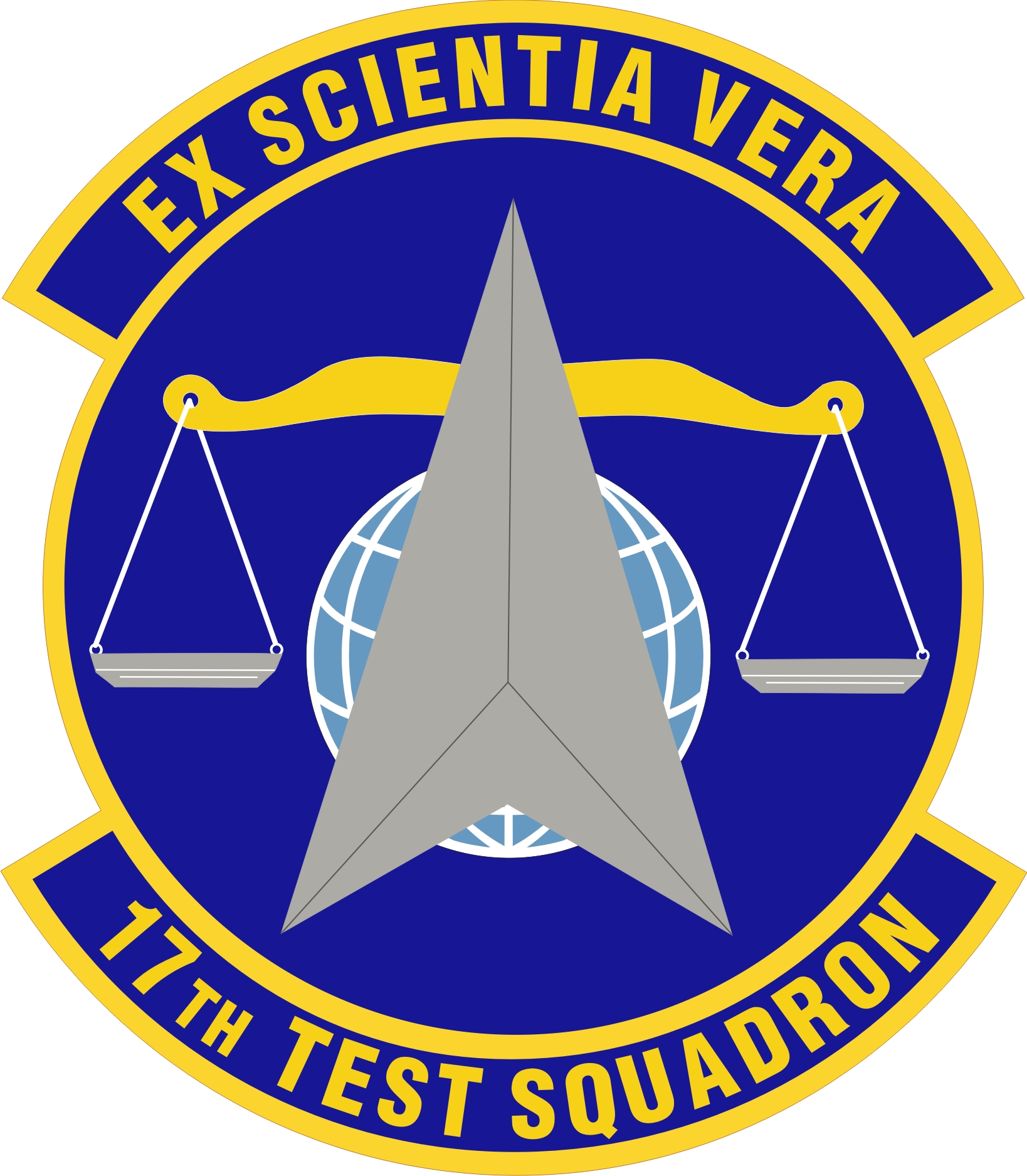

On 12 July 1995, the unit reactivated as the 17th Test Squadron. Operating Location A was activated at Cheyenne Mountain Air Force Station, Colorado.

The stand-up ceremony was held on Friday, 21 July 1996, in the Presentation Center of the Joint National Test Facility at 1300. The special guests included Col Burkhart, the 50th Space Wing Vice Commander; Col Deese, the AFSPC Comptroller; Col Kingsberry, from the AFSPC Division of Space Control; Col Mercier, Commander of Detachment 4 of the Air Force Operational Test and Evaluation Center; and Col Springer, from AFSPC Division of Training and Standardization. After the reading of the activation orders, the 17th's guidon was unsheathed, symbolizing the activation of a new USAF squadron. Then the guidon was passed to Col Howard J. Fry, the Commander of the Space Warfare Center and the presiding officer for the stand-up. Colonel Fry passed the guidon to Lt Col Carl Cox, the first Commander of the 17th, signifying the passing of all legal and operational responsibilities. At the formation of the squadron, manning was at just over ten people.

On 1 April 2013 the 17th Test Squadron was transferred to Air Combat Command under the 53d Wing, located at Eglin Air Force Base, Florida, which serves as the focal point for the Combat Air Forces in electronic warfare, armament and avionics, chemical defense, reconnaissance, and aircrew training devices. The wing reports to the Air Warfare Center at Nellis Air Force Base, Nevada. The wing is also responsible for operational testing and evaluation of new equipment and systems proposed for use by these forces.

On 7 August 2020 the 17th Test Squadron was transferred to the United States Space Force under Space Training and Readiness Delta (Provisional), Space Operations Command.

On 20 August 2021 the 17th Test Squadron was reassigned from Space Operations Command to Space Training and Readiness Command and further assigned to Space Delta 12 and redesignated the 17th Test and Evaluation Squadron.

== Lineage ==
- Designated as the 1017th Test and Evaluation Squadron and activated on 6 April 1990
- Inactivated on 15 October 1992
- Redesignated 17th Test Squadron on 30 June 1995
- Activated on 21 July 1995
- Redesignated 17th Test and Evaluation Squadron on 20 August 2021

=== Assignments ===
- Air Force Space Command, 6 April 1990 – 15 October 1992
- Space Warfare Center, 21 July 1995
- 595th Test and Evaluation Group (later 595th Space Group), 7 April 2000
- 53d Test Management Group, 1 April 2013 – 7 August 2020
- Space Training and Readiness Delta (Provisional), Space Operations Command, August 7, 2020 - August 20, 2021.
- Space Delta 12, Space Training and Readiness Command, August 20, 2021 – Present.

=== Components ===
- Detachment 1: Buckley Space Force Base, Colorado

=== Stations ===
- Peterson Air Force Base, Colorado, 6 April 1990 - 15 October 1992
- Falcon Air Force Base (later Schriever Space Force Base), Colorado, 21 July 1995 - 5 June 1998
- Schriever Air Force Base, Colorado, June 5, 1998 - July 26, 2021
- Schriever Space Force Base, Colorado, July 26, 2021 – Present

=== Decorations ===
Award streamer	Award	Dates	Notes
	Air Force Outstanding Unit Award	6 April 1990 – 5 April 1992	1017th Test and Evaluation Squadron
	Air Force Outstanding Unit Award	31 July 1996 – 30 July 1998	17th Test Squadron
	Air Force Outstanding Unit Award	31 July 1998 – 30 August 1999	17th Test Squadron
	Air Force Outstanding Unit Award	1 January 2000 – 30 September 2001	17th Test Squadron
	Air Force Outstanding Unit Award	1 September 2004 – 31 August 2005	17th Test Squadron
	Air Force Outstanding Unit Award	1 September 2005 – 31 August 2006	17th Test Squadron
	Air Force Outstanding Unit Award	1 September 2006 – 31 August 2007	17th Test Squadron
	Air Force Outstanding Unit Award	1 September 2007 – 31 August 2008	17th Test Squadron
	Air Force Organizational Excellence Award	1 September 2002 – 1 September 2003	17th Test Squadron
	Air Force Organizational Excellence Award	2 September 2003 – 31 August 2004	17th Test Squadron

== List of commanders ==
- Lt Col Teddy N. Wang, 6 April 1990 - unknown
- Lt Col Carl L. Cox, 21 July 1995 - 17 October 1997
- Lt Col Wyatt C. Miller, 17 October 1997 - 2 December 1998
- Lt Col Mark A. Johnson, 2 December 1998 - 5 December 2000
- Lt Col James O'Neal, Jr., 5 December 2000 - 17 March 2003
- Lt Col Richard W. Boltz, 17 March 2003 - 27 June 2005
- Lt Col Scott J. Hower, 27 June 2005 - 8 June 2007
- Lt Col Edward T. Ackerman, 8 June 2007 - 17 June 2009
- Lt Col Peter J. Flores, 17 June 2009 - 17 June 2011
- Lt Col Gregory Wood, 17 June 2011 - 6 June 2013
- Lt Col Todd Bridges, 6 June 2013 - 16 June 2015
- Lt Col David R. Morrow, 15 June 2015 – 23 June 2017
- Lt Col Sacha Tomlinson, 23 June 2017- 26 June 2019
- Lt Col Robert C. McConnell, 26 June 2019 - 8 June 2021
- Lt Col Christopher W. McLeod, 8 June 2021 - 8 August 2023
- Lt Col Nichols S. Schmidt, 8 August 2023 - 3 June 2025
- Lt Col Jon R. Anderson, 3 June 2025 – Present

== See also ==
- 14th Test Squadron - Air Force Reserve associate of the 17th Test Squadron
