= 21st Space Operations Squadron =

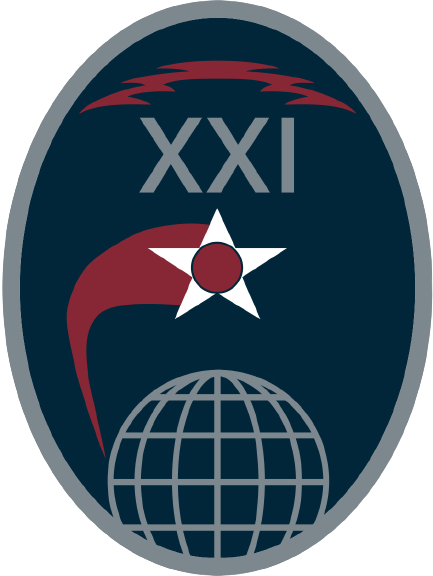
- 21st Space Operations Squadron emblem
- Founded: 1 October 1991; 33 years ago
- Country: United States
- Branch: United States Space Force
- Type: Space operations
- Role: Satellite command and control
- Part of: Space Delta 6
- Garrison/HQ: Vandenberg Space Force Base, California, U.S.
- Nickname(s): Eye In The Sky
- Motto(s): "Gateway To The Stars"
- Decorations: AFOUA; Air and Space Campaign

Commanders
- Current commander: Lt Col Matthew Knepper

The 21st Space Operations Squadron (21 SOPS) is a satellite control unit of the Space Delta 6 of the United States Space Force, located at Vandenberg Space Force Base, California. Prior to July 2020, it was part of the 50th Network Operations Group. It operated Onizuka Air Force Station from its formation in 1991 until the closure of the station in 2010.

== Mission ==
The mission of the 21st Space Operations Squadron is to plan and conduct specialized communications for a wide spectrum of Department of Defense, allied, civilian and national space systems. The squadron monitors, maintains and updates status of the $6.2 billion Satellite Control Network resources, providing configuration and readiness condition of controlled resources. The squadron operates four SCN remote tracking stations performing on-orbit satellite tracking, telemetry, commanding, mission data retrieval operations, pre-launch satellite test and checkout, as well as direct operations launch support. Additionally, the squadron is responsible for the operations and maintenance support of the Global Positioning System ground antennas and monitor stations at Diego Garcia Tracking Station, Kaena Point Tracking Station, and the Kwajalein Atoll, Republic of the Marshall Islands.

== Operations ==
The 21st Space Operations Squadron supports DOD-assigned space missions by operating, maintaining and providing logistical support for the common user resources of the SCN. The 21 SOPS Network Operations Center is the prime SCN fault detection and isolation resource for the primary and additional operational switch replacement communication links. The squadron supports more than 150 DOD, allied, civil and national satellites by monitoring, maintaining and updating status of SCN communication resources, and providing configuration and readiness condition of controlled resources to multiple users and command centers.

In addition to providing worldwide SCN access, 21 SOPS also enables specialized support to the international space community by providing network communications. The unit is responsible for operating and maintaining two 38-foot Defense Information Systems Agency satellite communication antennas.

The 21st Space Operations Squadron is also responsible for all operations, maintenance and personnel performing SCN operations at Vandenberg Tracking Station, Vandenberg SFB, Calif; Diego Garcia Tracking Station, British Indian Ocean Territory; Guam Tracking Station, Andersen AFB, Guam; and Hawaii Tracking Station, Kaena Point, Hawaii. Each provides telemetry, tracking and commanding for high-priority DOD, NASA, and NATO spacecraft. Additionally, Vandenberg Tracking Station provides pre-launch compatibility and direct launch operations support to the Western Range launch complex. The squadron also hosts the 148th Space Operations Squadron (California Air National Guard), SCN Backup Network Operations Center, Global Positioning System Alternate Master Control Station, the combined Backup Satellite Operations Center for 3rd Space Operations Squadron and 4th Space Operations Squadron, as well as the Milstar Satellite Operations Center.

== Component units and operating locations ==
The 21st Space Operations Squadron operates from several locations around the globe:

Component units and operating locations of the 21st Space Operations Squadron
Unit	Site Name	Location	Country	Callsign
21st Space Operations Squadron	Ellison Onizuka Satellite Operations Facility	Vandenberg SFB, California	United States	COOK
21st Space Operations Squadron	Vandenberg Tracking Station	Vandenberg Tracking Station, California	United States	COOK
Detachment 1	Diego Garcia Tracking Station	Naval Support Facility Diego Garcia	British Indian Ocean Territory	REEF
Detachment 2	Guam Tracking Station	Northwest Field, Andersen AFB	Guam	GUAM
Detachment 3	Hawaii Tracking Station	Ka'ena Point Satellite Tracking Station, Hawaii	United States	HULA
Operating Location Alpha	N/A	Kwajalein Atoll	Marshall Islands	N/A

== History ==
The birth of the National Security Space Enterprise was the Corona photo intelligence gathering satellite program. Recently declassified, this program convinced the Air Force a dedicated unit was needed to provide satellite tracking. In April 1959, the 6594th Test Wing was activated with temporary headquarters in Palo Alto, Calif. In 1960, land was purchased in Sunnyvale, Calif. and the 6594th Test Wing relocated to form the Air Force Satellite Test Center. Construction on the "Blue Cube" was completed in 1968, and on 1 Jan. 1971, the Sunnyvale facilities became Sunnyvale Air Force Station. The installation was renamed Onizuka Air Force Station on 24 July 1986, in honor of Col. Ellison Onizuka, who lost his life in the Space Shuttle Challenger accident.

The 21st Space Operations Squadron was activated on 1 October 1991, and within one year, absorbed the roles of the 2nd Satellite Tracking Group and the 1999th Communications Squadron. After the 1995 Base Realignment and Closure committee directed realignment of Onizuka AFS, 21 SOPS absorbed the roles of the 750th Space Group and all subordinate units, to include the 5th Space Operations Squadron. On 10 March 2004, the squadron became part of the 50th Network Operations Group. In 2005, the BRAC committee directed Onizuka AFS to close not later than 15 September 2011. On 29 July 2010, the squadron relocated to Vandenberg SFB after the closure of Onizuka, gaining Detachment 1, Vandenberg Tracking Station, from the 22nd Space Operations Squadron. At Vandenburg, the squadron operated the Ellison Onizuka Satellite Operations Facility. On 1 October 2010, the 50th Network Operations Group reorganized and the squadron gained Diego Garcia Tracking Station, British Indian Ocean Territory; Guam Tracking Station, Andersen AFB, Guam; and Hawaii Tracking Station, Kaena Point, Hawaii.

On 1 August 2011, the Global Positioning System (GPS) Ground Antennas and Monitoring Stations were transitioned from the 2nd Space Operations Squadron (of the 50th Operations Group) to the 21st, 22nd, 23rd Space Operations Squadrons (of the 50th Network Operations Group). At this time, 21 SOPS absorbed maintenance, quality assurance and real property responsibilities for GPS sites at Kwajalein Atoll, Diego Garcia Tracking Station and Kaena Point Tracking Station.

== List of commanders ==
- Lt Col Sam McNiel, 2007-2009
- Lt Col Robert Pavelko, 2009-2011
- Lt Col Michael Wulfestieg, 2011–2013
- Lt Col Sean Scott, 2013-2015
- Lt Col Phillip Verroco, 2015–2017
- Lt Col Wade McGrew, ~2019
- Lt Col Samuel Oppelaar, 2019–2021
- Lt Col Justin Roque, 21 May 2021
- Lt Col Matthew Knepper, 9 June 2023
