= Ka'ena Point Space Force Station =

Space Force Station in Hawaii

- Ka'ena Point, Oahu, Hawaii in the United States of America
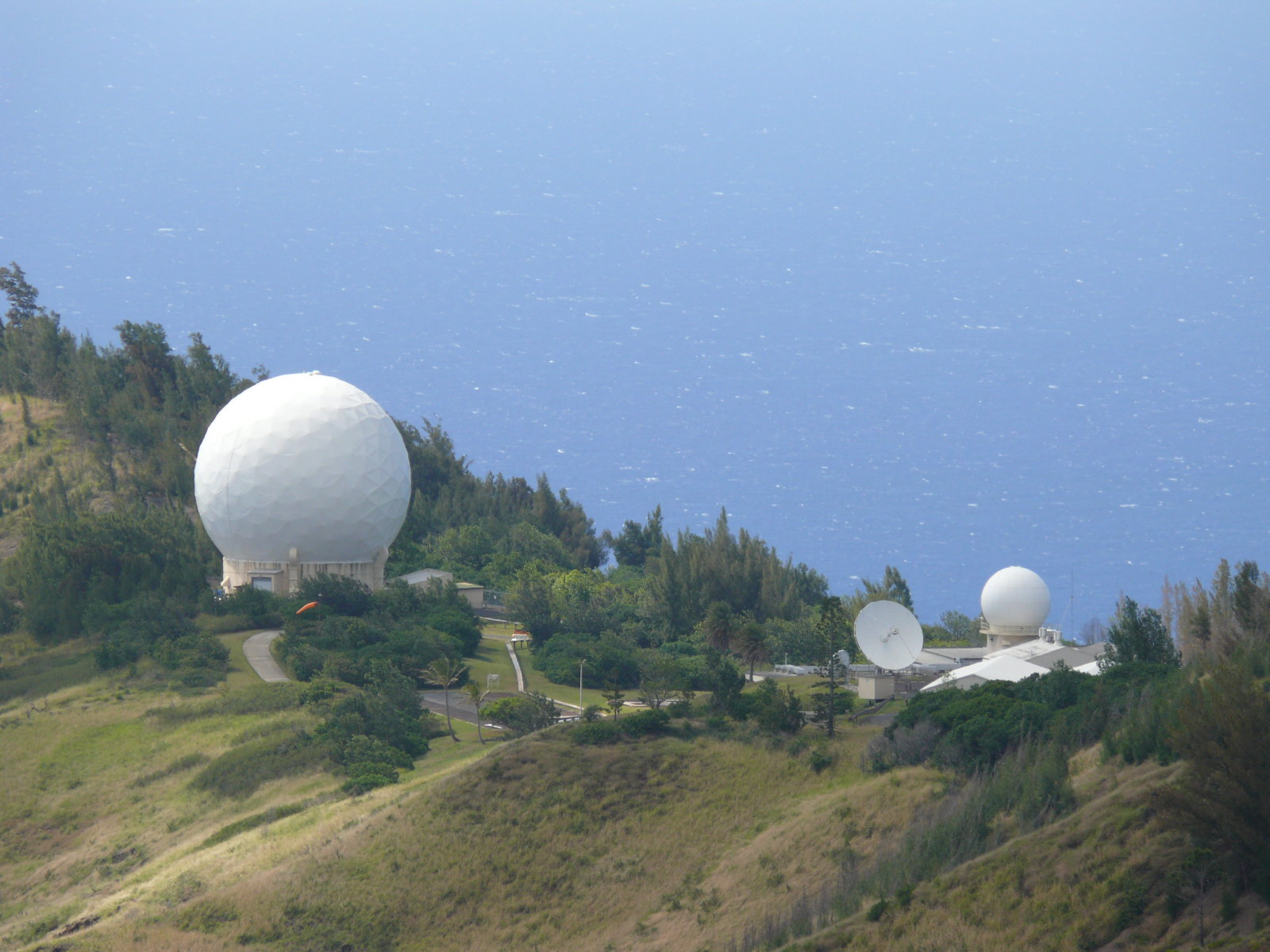
- Antennae at Ka'ena Point

- Shield of the Space Base Delta 1

Site information
- Type: Satellite tracking station
- Owner: Department of Defense
- Operator: United States Space Force
- Controlled by: Space Base Delta 1
- Open to the public: Partially, to access neighboring trails and campsites
- Condition: Operational

Location
- Location in Hawaii
- Coordinates: 21°33′41.0″N 158°14′21.2″W
- Area: 153 acres (62 ha)

Site history
- Built: 1959
- In use: 1959 – 2019 (US Air Force); 2019 – present (US Space Force)

Garrison information
- Occupants: 21st Space Operations Squadron (Detachment 3)

Ka'ena Point Space Force Station is a United States Space Force installation in Ka'ena Point on the island of Oahu in Hawaii. It is a remote tracking station of the Satellite Control Network responsible for tracking satellites in orbit, many of which support the United States Department of Defense, receiving and processing data and in turn, enabling control of satellites by relaying commands from control centers.

The station originally opened in 1959 to support the Corona reconnaissance program.

Detachment 3, 21st Space Operations Squadron, part of Space Delta 6, operates Hawaii Tracking Station on the site. It was constructed in 1959, one of three built that year. The facility is placed near the westernmost point of the island of Oahu, atop a 1,500-foot (460 m) high ridge. The two radomes are locally known as the "golf balls", and are a popular landmark for fishing vessels in the surrounding waters.

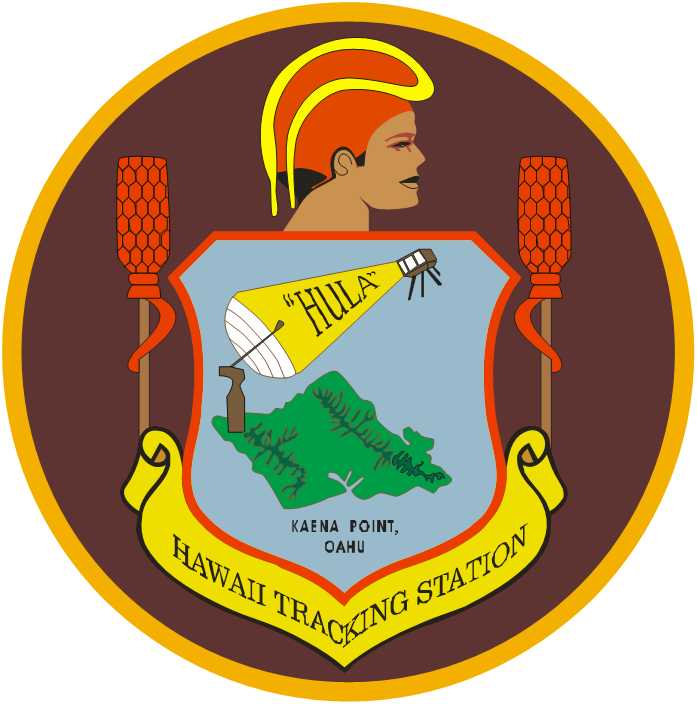
Ka'ena Point Satellite Tracking Station emblem. By Earl Kokobun, 1983

Yokohama Bay State Park is at the base of the ridge, with a hiking trail that goes to the point and around to the northern side of the ridge, to Mokuleia Beach. The station roadways provide access to state hiking and hunting trails, as well as a camping site about 10 miles (16 km) inland called Peacock Flats by permit only. Permits to enter through the station to hike, hunt, or camp on the surrounding State lands can be obtained from the Hawaii Department of Land and Natural Resources in downtown Honolulu.

On 16 June 2021, it was renamed from Ka'ena Point Satellite Tracking Station to Ka'ena Point Space Force Station.
