= Missile Defense Integration and Operations Center =

Ops center responsible for missile defense analysis for the US military

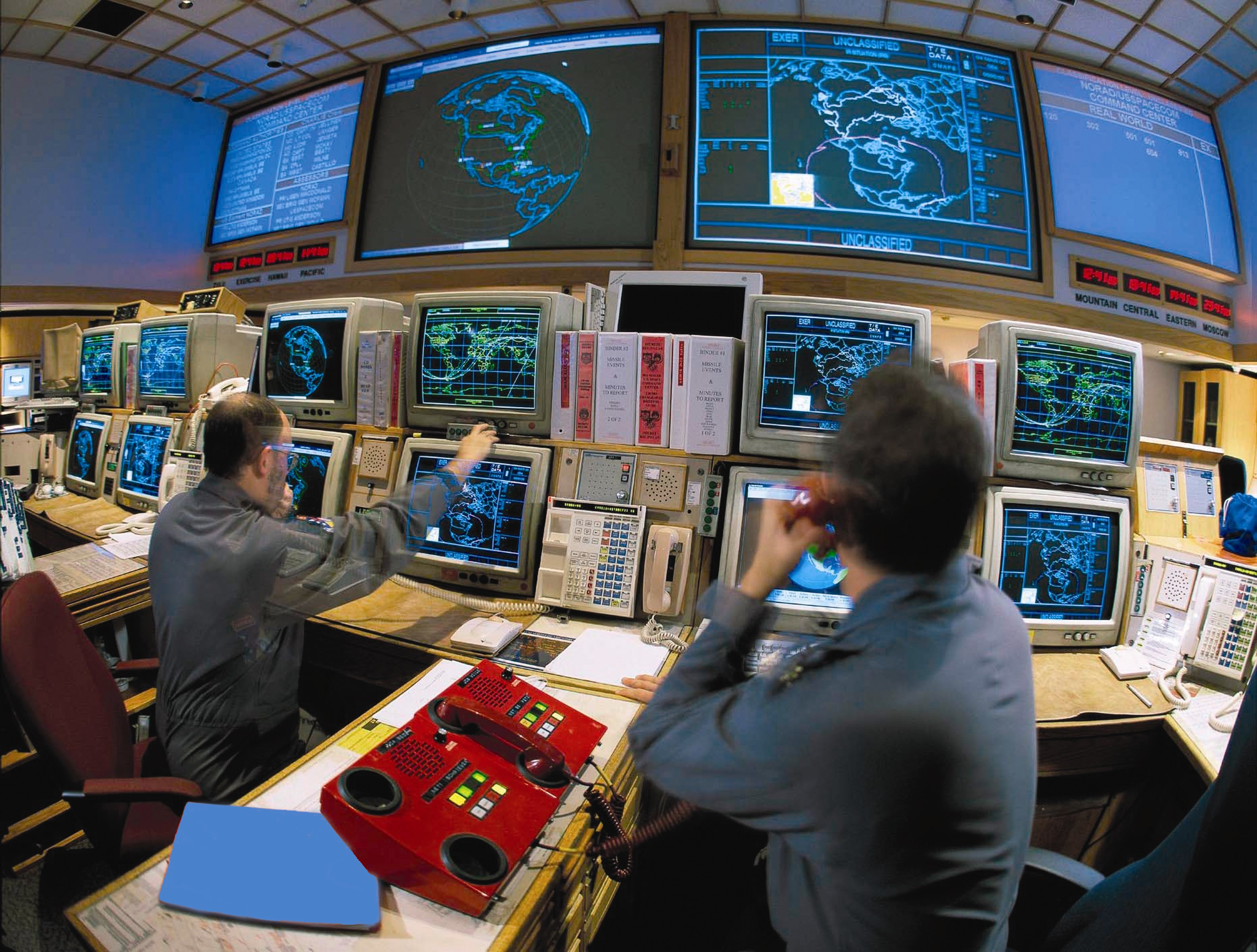
Missile Defense Integration and Operations Center C2BMC Control Room

In the military of the United States, the Missile Defense Integration and Operations Center (MDIOC), formerly Joint National Integration Center (JNIC) and before that the Joint National Test Facility (JNTF), at Schriever Space Force Base is responsible for the missile defense analysis of the United States Missile Defense Agency.

The MDIOC is a research center, whose mission is to provide missile defense related analysis, system level engineering, integration, and test and evaluation support for the development, acquisition, and deployment of missile defense systems and architectures. The MDIOC supports the development of joint and combined missile defense doctrine, requirements, and concept(s) of operations (CONOPS); as well as supporting combatant commands by integrating missile defense concepts, space asset exploitation, battle management/command, control, communications, computers, and intelligence (BM/C4I), and by conducting joint and combined simulations, wargames and participating in exercises as directed.
