= Independent test organization =

Organization that tests according to agreed requirements

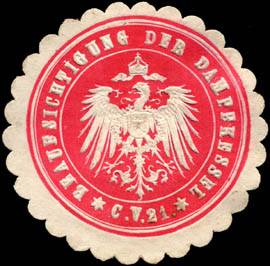
Official seal: Supervision of Steam Boilers

An independent test organization is an organization, person, or company that tests products, materials, software, etc. according to agreed requirements. The test organization can be affiliated with the government or universities or can be an independent testing laboratory. They are independent because they are not affiliated with the producer nor the user of the item being tested: no commercial bias is present. These "contract testing" facilities are sometimes called "third party" testing or evaluation facilities.

== Affiliation ==
Many suppliers or vendors offer some chemical testing, physical testing, and software testing as a free service to customers. It is common for businesses to partner with reputable suppliers: Many suppliers have certified quality management systems such as ISO 9000 or allow customers to conduct technical and quality audits. Data from testing is commonly shared. There is sometimes a risk that supplier testing may tend to be self-serving and not completely impartial.

Large companies often have their own specialized staff and testing facilities laboratory. Corporate engineers know their products, manufacturing capabilities, logistics system, and their customers best. Cost reduction of existing products and cost avoidance for new products have been documented.

Another option is to use paid consultants, Independent contractors, and third-party test laboratories. They are commonly chosen for specialized expertise, for access to certain test equipment, for surge projects, or where independent testing is otherwise required. Many have certifications and accreditations: ISO 9000, ISO/IEC 17025, and various governing agencies.

Independent third party laboratories should not be affiliated with any supplier as such affiliation creates bias.

== Purposes ==
Independent testing might have a variety of purposes, such as:

- Determine if, or verify that, the requirements of a specification, regulation, or contract are met
- Decide if a new product development program is on track: Demonstrate proof of concept
- Provide standard data for other scientific, engineering, and quality assurance functions
- Validate suitability for end-use
- Provide a basis for technical communication
- Provide a technical means of comparison of several options
- Provide evidence in legal proceedings: forensics, product liability, patents, product claims, etc.
- Help solve problems with current products or services
- Help identify potential cost savings in products or services

== Industry standards ==
There are various technical standards available which organizations can use to evaluate products and services. Test methods are published by regulators or can be included in specifications or contracts. International standards organizations also publish test methods:

- International Organization for Standardization, ISO
- ASTM International
- European Committee for Standardization. CEN
- Military Standards
- etc.

=== Software ===
For example in software usage, the Capability Maturity Model Integration (CMMI) is a process improvement approach that “provides organizations with the essential elements of effective processes.” There are various levels attainable within CMMI, the highest of which is Level 5. Attaining this level of certification verifies that the practices of the organization are exemplary.

The Testing Maturity Model (TMM) has been designed to complement CMMI and is based on best industry practices. The TMM has 2 components; firstly, a set of 5 levels that define testing capability covering maturity goals, subgoals and activities, tasks and responsibilities and secondly, an assessment model consisting of a maturity questionnaire and an assessment procedure.

There is also the Test Process Improvement model from Sogeti. This supports the improvement of test processes by looking at 20 key areas and has different levels therein to enable insight into the state of the key areas. In order to satisfy the criteria stipulated in the best practice guidelines, organizations must be committed and must invest time and money to implement and adhere to the processes as defined by such guidelines.

Typically, companies have a small test team which coordinates the entire testing activity. During the testing cycle, the test team is supplemented with the readily available developers.

== Pros and cons of independent testing ==
=== Pros ===
- No commercial bias is present: test reports have more credibility.
- The turnaround time for test activity is often much shorter because the independent laboratory specializes in testing
- Independent organizations often have specialized facilities with current calibration
- Personnel often have excellent experience, credentials, certifications, and accreditations.

=== Cons ===
- Costs of contract testing
- Independent testers do not know the product, service, or customer as well as the producer or developer. Close coordination is needed.

== See also ==
- Standards organization
- Product testing
- Verification and validation
