= United States Indo-Pacific Command =

US joint military command

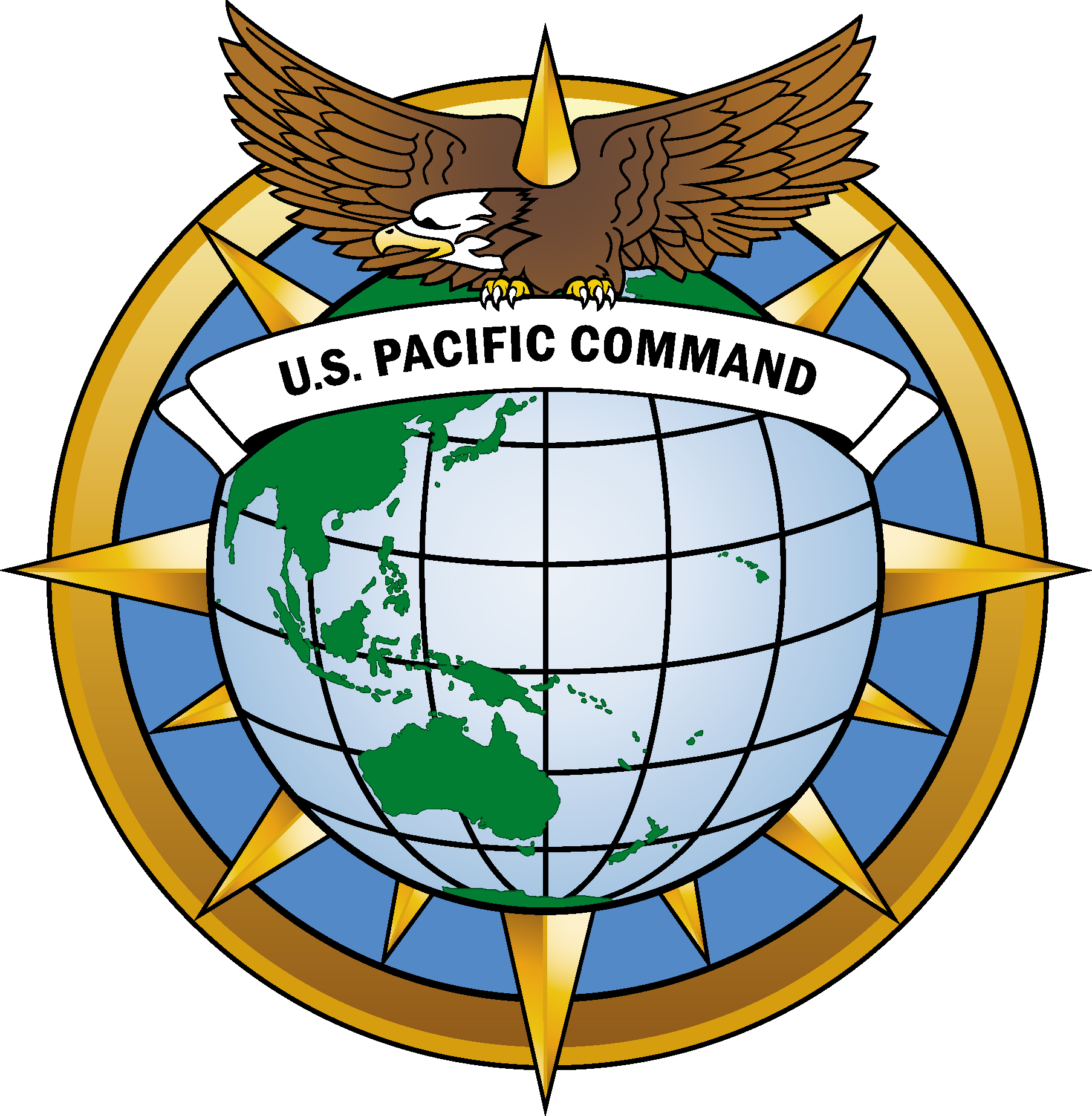
- Founded: 1 January 1947 (79 years, 9 months ago)
- Country: United States
- Type: Unified combatant command
- Role: Geographic combatant command
- Size: 375,000 personnel
- Part of: United States Department of Defense
- Headquarters: Camp H. M. Smith, Hawaii, U.S.
- Engagements: Korean War; Vietnam War; Cambodian Civil War
- Decorations: Joint Meritorious Unit Award
- Website: www.pacom.mil

Commanders
- Commander: Admiral Samuel Paparo, USN
- Deputy Commander: Lieutenant General George B. Rowell, USMC
- Chief of Staff: Major General Michael R. Drowley, USAF
- Senior Enlisted Leader: Sergeant Major Eric D. Cook, USMC

Insignia
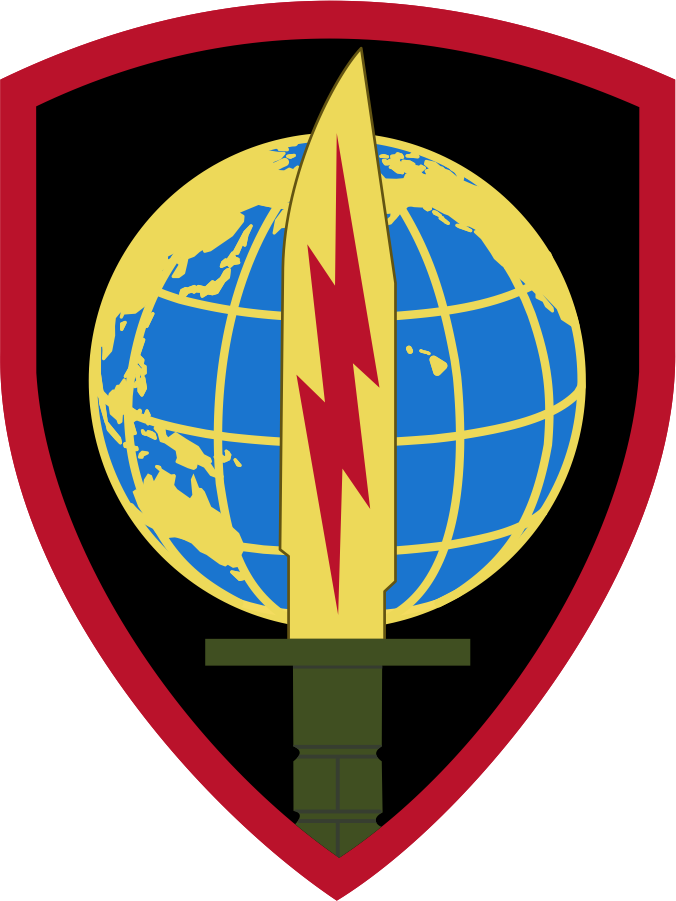
- US ARMY ELEMENT PACIFIC COMMAND SSI

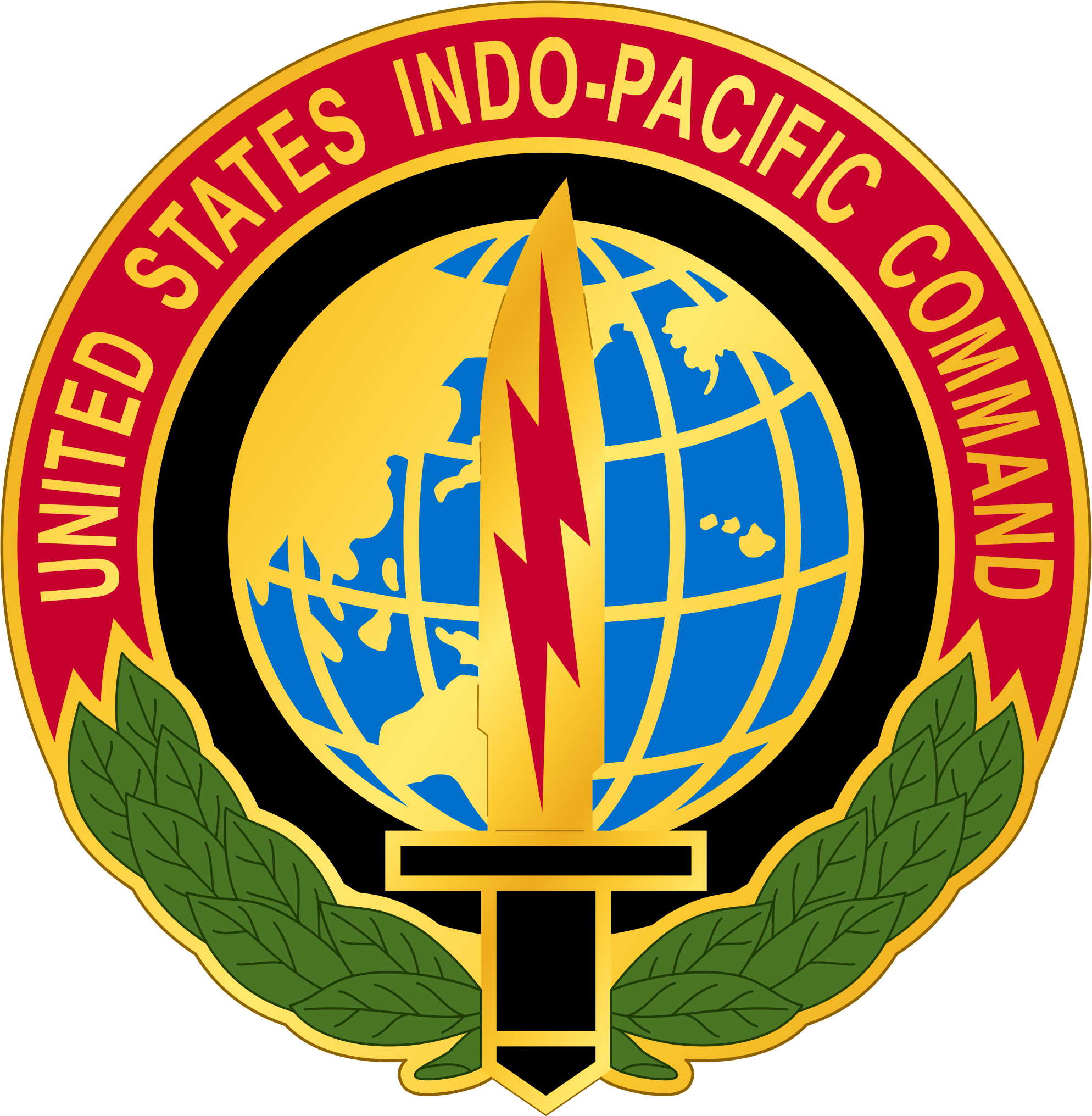
- US ARMY ELEMENT PACIFIC COMMAND DUI

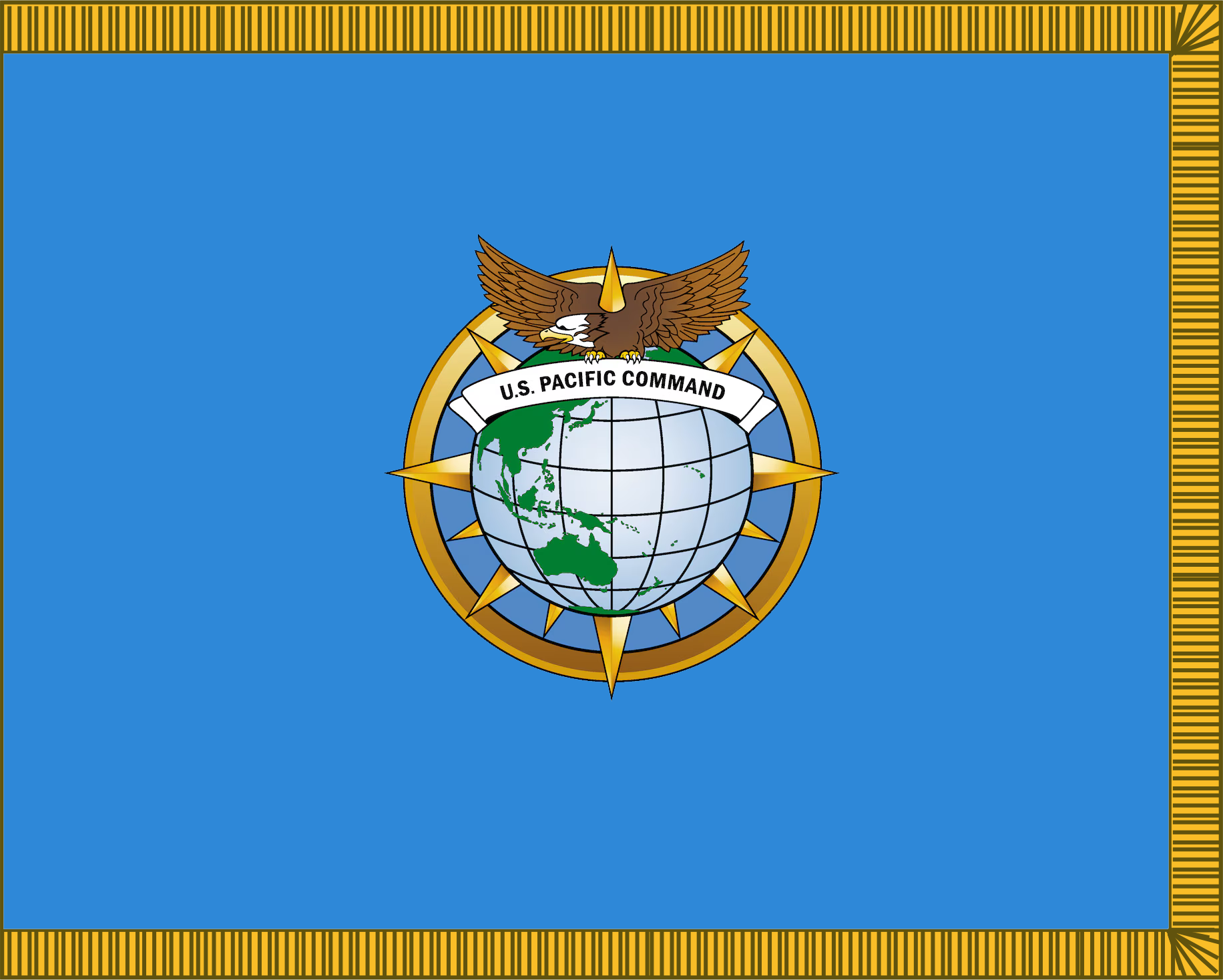
- US Pacific Command Flag

The United States Indo-Pacific Command (USINDOPACOM), secondarily known as the United States Pacific Command (USPACOM), is the unified combatant command of the United States Armed Forces responsible for the Indo-Pacific region.

It is the oldest and largest of the unified combatant commands. Its commander, the senior U.S. military officer in the Pacific, is responsible for more than 375,000 service members, as well as an area that encompasses more than 100 million square miles (260,000,000 km^{2}), or roughly 52 percent of the Earth's surface. This area stretches from the waters of the West Coast of the United States to the west coast maritime borderline waters of India, at the meridian 66° longitude line (east of Greenwich), and from the Bering Sea to the Antarctic.

Founded in 1947 as U.S. Pacific Command, it was renamed U.S. Indo-Pacific Command in 2018 as an acknowledgment of India–United States relations. In 2026, the Department of Defense rebranded the command as "United States Pacific Command"; the legal name remains U.S. Indo-Pacific Command.

The command consists of:

- A headquarters organization.
- Five subordinate service component commands (U.S. Army Pacific, U.S. Marine Forces Pacific, U.S. Pacific Fleet, U.S. Pacific Air Forces, and U.S. Space Forces Indo-Pacific).
- Three subordinate unified commands (U.S. Forces Japan, U.S. Forces Korea—which includes Special Operations Command Korea—and Special Operations Command Pacific).
- Two direct reporting units (U.S. Pacific Command Joint Intelligence Operations Center and the Center for Excellence in Disaster Management and Humanitarian Assistance).
- Two standing joint task forces (Joint Interagency Task Force West) and Joint Task Force Red Hill.

The command's headquarters is the Nimitz-MacArthur Pacific Command Center on Camp H. M. Smith in Hawaii.

== Mission ==
In 2016, the command's mission was:

United States Pacific Command protects and defends, in concert with other U.S. Government agencies, the territory of the United States, its people, and its interests. With allies and partners, we will enhance stability in the Indo-Asia-Pacific region by promoting security cooperation, encouraging peaceful development, responding to contingencies, deterring aggression, and, when necessary, fighting to win. This approach is based on partnership, presence, and military readiness. We recognize the global significance of the Indo-Asia-Pacific region and understand that challenges are best met together. Consequently, we will remain an engaged and trusted partner committed to preserving the security, stability, and freedom upon which enduring prosperity in the Indo-Asia-Pacific region depends. We will collaborate with the Services and other Combatant Commands to defend America's interests.

== Geographic scope ==
Surface-based geographic combatant commands' areas of responsibility

The command's area of responsibility (AOR) encompasses the Pacific Ocean from Antarctica at 92°W, north to 8°N, west to 112°W, northwest to 50°N/142°W, west to 170°E, north to 53°N, northeast to 62°30'N/175°W, north to 64°45'N/175°W, south along the Russian territorial waters to the People's Republic of China, Mongolia, the Democratic People's Republic of Korea, the Republic of Korea, and Japan; the countries of Southeast Asia and the southern Asian landmass to the western border of India; the Indian Ocean east and south of the line from the India–Pakistan coastal border west to 68°E, south along 68°E to Antarctica; Australia; New Zealand; Antarctica, and Hawaii.

In all, it encompasses:

- 36 nations
- More than half the world's population
- 3,200 different languages
- 5 of 7 collective defense treaties

== Force structure ==
=== Component commands ===
Emblem	Command	Acronym	Commander	Established	Headquarters	Subordinate Commands
	United States Army Pacific; Joint Force Land Component Command	USARPAC	General Ronald P. Clark	1 October 2000	Fort Shafter, Hawaii	Eighth Army; 2nd Infantry Division; 19th Expeditionary Sustainment Command; I Corps; 4th Infantry Division; 7th Infantry Division / Multi-Domain Command Pacific; 11th Airborne Division; 25th Infantry Division; 593rd Corps Sustainment Command; United States Army Japan; 94th Army Air & Missile Defense Command; 8th Theater Sustainment Command; 9th Mission Support Command; 18th Medical Command; 196th Infantry Brigade; 311th Signal Command (Theater); 500th Military Intelligence Brigade
	United States Marine Corps Forces, Pacific	MARFORPAC	Lieutenant General James F. Glynn	27 July 1992	Camp H. M. Smith, Hawaii	I Marine Expeditionary Force; III Marine Expeditionary Force; Marine Corps Base Camp Blaz; Marine Rotational Force – Darwin
	United States Pacific Fleet; Joint Force Maritime Component Command	USPACFLT	Admiral Stephen Koehler	22 July 1907	Joint Base Pearl Harbor–Hickam, Hawaii	United States Third Fleet; United States Seventh Fleet; Naval Air Force Pacific; Naval Surface Force Pacific; U.S. Naval Forces Japan; U.S. Naval Forces Korea; Joint Region Marianas; Logistics Group Western Pacific; Navy Region Hawaii
	Pacific Air Forces; Joint Force Air Component Command	PACAF	General Kevin B. Schneider	3 August 1944	Joint Base Pearl Harbor–Hickam, Hawaii	Fifth Air Force; Seventh Air Force; Eleventh Air Force; 613th Air Operations Center
	United States Space Forces – Indo-Pacific; Joint Force Space Component Command	SPACEFORINDOPAC	Brig Gen Brian Denaro	22 November 2022	Joint Base Pearl Harbor–Hickam, Hawaii	U.S. Space Forces Korea; U.S. Space Forces Japan

=== Subordinate unified commands ===
Emblem	Command	Acronym	Commander	Established	Headquarters	Subordinate Commands
	United States Forces Japan	USFJ	Lieutenant General Stephen F. Jost, USAF	1 July 1957	Yokota Air Base, Tokyo, Japan	United States Army, Japan; Fifth Air Force; Naval Forces Japan; III Marine Expeditionary Force; U.S. Space Forces Japan
	United States Forces Korea	USFK	General Xavier Brunson, USA	1 July 1957	Camp Humphreys, Pyeongtaek, South Korea	Eighth United States Army; Seventh Air Force; U.S. Naval Forces Korea; U.S. Marine Forces Korea; U.S. Space Forces Korea; Special Operations Command Korea
	Special Operations Command Pacific	SOCPAC	Major General Jeffrey A. VanAntwerp, USA	1 November 1965	Camp H.M. Smith, Hawaii	

=== Direct reporting units ===
Emblem	Command	Acronym	Commander	Established	Headquarters	Subordinate Commands
JIOC symbol.	Joint Intelligence Operations Center Pacific	JIOC	Colonel Matthew G. Rau	1 January 1983	Joint Base Pearl Harbor–Hickam, Hawaii	
	Center for Excellence in Disaster Management and Humanitarian Assistance	CFE-DM	Joseph D. Martin	1994	Joint Base Pearl Harbor–Hickam, Hawaii	

=== Standing joint task force ===
Emblem	Command	Acronym	Commander	Established	Headquarters	Subordinate Commands
	Joint Interagency Task Force West	JIATF West	Rear Admiral Bob Little, USCG	10 February 1989	Camp H.M. Smith, Hawaii	

== History ==
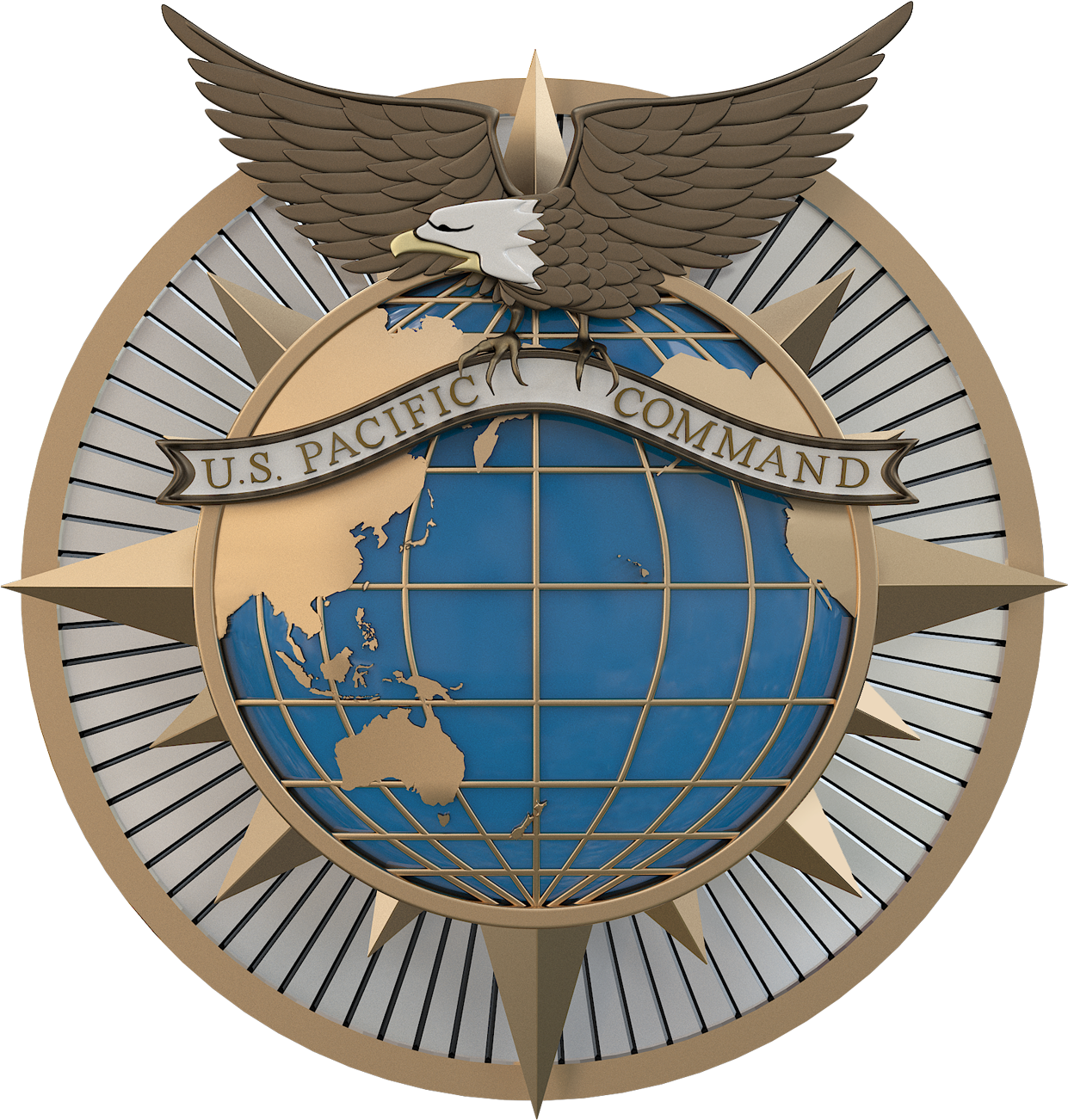
Emblem of the Pacific Command until 2018.

=== Establishment of unified commands in the Pacific ===
The command has evolved through the consolidation of various commands in the Pacific and Far East. Its origins can be traced to the command structure established early in World War II to wage the war in the Pacific.

In April 1942, U.S. military forces in the Pacific Theatre were divided into two commands: the South West Pacific Area (SWPA) under Army General Douglas MacArthur; and the Pacific Ocean Areas (POA) under Navy Admiral Chester W. Nimitz. Each had command of all U.S. military forces assigned to his area. The authority of the POA Commander-in-Chief (CINCPOA) was technically separate from that of the Commander in Chief, Pacific Fleet (CINCPAC), but Admiral Nimitz was assigned to both positions and bore the title CINCPAC/CINCPOA.

Efforts to establish a unified command for the entire Pacific AOR proved impossible during the war. The divergent interests of the Army and the Navy precluded the subordination of either of the two principal commanders in the Pacific Theatre. When the war ended in September 1945, the command arrangement carried forward with Fleet Admiral Nimitz as CINCPAC/CINCPOA and General of the Army MacArthur as Commander in Chief, U.S. Army Forces Pacific (CINCAFPAC).

Command arrangements after World War II were defined by the "Outline Command Plan" – in a sense, the first Unified Command Plan (UCP) – approved by President Harry S. Truman on 14 December 1946 and authorized by the National Security Act of 1947. The plan called for the establishment of seven unified combatant commands as "an interim measure for the immediate postwar period."

The first three unified commands were established in the Pacific. The Joint Chiefs of Staff implementing directive of 16 December 1946 established the Far East Command (FECOM), Pacific Command (PACOM), and Alaskan Command (ALCOM) effective 1 January 1947. The commands, their areas of responsibility, and their missions were as follows:

- Far East Command: U.S. forces in Japan, Korea, the Ryukyus, the Philippines, and the Mariana and Bonin Islands. The Commander-in-Chief, Far East (CINCFE) would carry out occupation duties, maintain the security of the command, plan and prepare for a general emergency in the area, support the Commander-in-Chief, Pacific (CINCPAC), and command U.S. forces in China in an emergency.
- Pacific Command: U.S. forces allocated by the Joint Chiefs of Staff within the Pacific Area. CINCPAC would defend the United States against attack through the Pacific, conduct operations in the Pacific, maintain the security of U.S. island positions and of sea and air communications, support U.S. military commitments in China, plan and prepare for a general emergency, and support CINCFE and Commander-in-Chief, Alaskan Command (CINCAL).
- Alaskan Command: U.S. forces in Alaska, including the Aleutian Islands. CINCAL would protect Alaska and its sea and air communications, defend the United States from attack through Alaska and the Arctic, plan and prepare for a general emergency, and support CINCFE, CINCPAC, and the Commanding General of the Strategic Air Command (CG SAC).

General of the Army Douglas MacArthur was appointed CINCFE; Army Major General Howard A. Craig was assigned as CINCAL. U.S. Navy Admiral John Henry Towers was designated CINCPAC. At the time of appointment, he was serving as Admiral Nimitz's direct successor as CINCPAC/CINCPOA. Admiral Towers retained his position as Commander-in-Chief, U.S. Pacific Fleet; his title was abbreviated CINCPACFLT to avoid confusion with the newly established Pacific Command. Headquarters for both CINCPAC and CINCPACFLT were located at Makalapa, Pearl Harbor, in the Territory of Hawaiʻi.

PACOM's original AOR ranged from Burma and the eastern Indian Ocean to the west coast of the Americas. Following a 1949 review of missions and deployments of U.S. forces, the Joint Chiefs of Staff revised the Unified Command Plan on 16 February 1950. The Volcano Islands were transferred to FECOM's AOR; likewise, responsibility for South Korea was transferred from FECOM to PACOM. The duty of protecting the Panama Canal remained assigned to Commander in Chief, Atlantic Command (CINCLANT); one year later, however, the Western approaches to the Canal would be reassigned to CINCPAC.

=== The Korean War ===
The outbreak of the Korean War and subsequent developments in the Far East tested the U.S. unified command structure in the Pacific. Although General MacArthur, as CINCFE, had been relieved of responsibility for South Korea, early U.S. reaction to North Korea's invasion of the South on 25 June 1950 came through his command. On 10 July, at the request of the United Nations, President Truman directed General MacArthur to establish the United Nations Command (UNC) for the purpose of directing operations against North Korean forces. U.S. forces assigned to FECOM were assigned to UNC with General MacArthur designated Commander-in-Chief, UNC (CINCUNC). The primary responsibility of CINCFE, however, remained the defense of Japan. During the war, CINCPAC was ordered to support CINCUNC/CINCFE.

With CINCFE focused on combat operations during the Korean War, the Joint Chiefs of Staff, over strong objection from FECOM, transferred the Mariana, Bonin and Volcano Islands to PACOM. In late 1951, PACOM was also assigned responsibility for the Philippines, the Pescadores, and Formosa (Taiwan).

=== Reorganization of 1956 ===
The new Unified Command Plan approved by Secretary of Defense Charles Wilson on 21 June 1956 produced significant changes to the command structure in the Pacific. ALCOM would remain as a unified command because of its strategic location, retaining its mission for the ground defense of the Alaskan region. Its other responsibilities, however, were reduced: the duty for the protection of sea communications in Alaskan waters was assumed by PACOM. The responsibilities of the Continental Air Defense Command (CONAD) would be likewise expanded to include the air defense of Alaska and the Northeast.

UCP 1956 also disestablished FECOM as a separate unified command. U.S. military deployments to Japan and Korea were decreasing after the end of Japanese reconstruction and the Korean War. The JCS, therefore, believed that the divided command structure in the Pacific should be abolished and FECOM's responsibility reassigned to PACOM. A subsequent outline plan to disestablish FECOM and transfer its responsibilities was approved by SECDEF and the JCS effective 1 July 1957. Under the plan, two subordinate unified commands under CINCPAC were established: Commander, U.S. Forces Japan (COMUSJAPAN) and Commander, U.S. Forces Korea (COMUSKOREA). The latter was dual-hatted as CINCUNC.

The UCP further specified that no unified commander would exercise direct command of any of its Service components or subordinate commands. As such, Admiral Felix Stump gave up direct command of the Pacific Fleet, delegating the responsibility of CINCPACFLT to his Deputy, Admiral Maurice E. Curts. CINCPAC's staff was thereafter separated from CINCPACFLT's staff and moved from Pearl Harbor to a new headquarters building (the former Aiea Naval Hospital) at Camp H.M. Smith. Service components for the Army and Air Force – U.S. Army Pacific (USARPAC) and U.S. Pacific Air Forces (PACAF) – were also assigned to PACOM.

=== The Vietnam War ===
Command over U.S. forces engaged in the Vietnam War was designated by CINCPAC to three subordinate commands. U.S. Military Assistance Command, Vietnam (USMACV), activated 8 February 1962 to direct U.S. support to South Vietnam's military forces, largely controlled all U.S. forces and operations within South Vietnam. Naval gunfire support and air strikes on targets in Vietnam, however, were delegated to PACFLT and the U.S. 7th Fleet. PACAF and PACFLT were responsible for conducting air and naval operations against North Vietnam and Laos. Control of B-52s employed to conduct airstrikes against targets in South Vietnam remained under the Strategic Air Command.

=== Command adjustments, 1971–1979 ===
A new Unified Command Plan was approved in 1971. Effective 1 January 1972, the Pacific Command assumed responsibility for the Indian Ocean and the countries of southern Asia extending westward to the eastern border of Iran (which then fell under EUCOM's responsibility). The Alaskan Command transferred responsibility for the Aleutian Islands and parts of the Arctic Ocean to PACOM, as well. ALCOM would remain a distinct unified command until it was disestablished by another Unified Command Plan on 1 July 1975. An amendment to this plan on 1 May 1976 adjusted PACOM's boundaries yet again. The amendment gave CINCPAC responsibility for the entire Indian Ocean to the east coast of Africa, including the Gulfs of Aden and Oman and all of the Indian Ocean Islands excepting the Malagasy Republic. This decision expanded PACOM's AOR across more than 50% of the Earth's surface an area of over 100 million square miles.

U.S. Army Pacific (USARPAC) was disestablished 31 December 1974 as part of a bid by the Army to reduce its headquarters. The much smaller U.S. Army CINCPAC Support Group (CSG) took over USARPAC's duty to assist and coordinate with CINCPAC Headquarters and PACOM service components on Army matters. In 1979, U.S. Army Western Command (WESTCOM) was activated as the new Army component for PACOM. WESTCOM was redesignated USARPAC effective 30 August 1990.

=== Unified Command Plan of 1983 ===
UCP 1983 dramatically increased the size of PACOM's AOR. While the establishment of U.S. Central Command (USCENTCOM) for the Middle East on 1 January 1983 meant PACOM delegated responsibility for Afghanistan and Pakistan to the new command, it took on responsibility for China, North Korea and Madagascar as military officials reasoned that issues arising from those countries could be best handled at the unified command level.

At the request of then-CINCPAC Admiral William Crowe, his title and that of his command were changed to USCINCPAC and USPACOM, respectively.

=== Boundary adjustment and Alaskan Command, 1989 ===
On 26 June 1989, Secretary of Defense Dick Cheney endorsed the recommendation from the Joint Chiefs of Staff to reassign the Gulfs of Aden and Oman from USPACOM to USCENTCOM's AOR. Though a modest shift, the change meant that the new boundary between the commands would no longer cut through the Strait of Hormuz. On 1 October 1989, the defense of Alaska and all units stationed there passed to USPACOM, which subsequently raised Alaskan Command (ALCOM) as a subordinate command.

=== Transfers of responsibility, 2002–2006 ===
Under UCP 2002, effective 21 January, Secretary of Defense Donald Rumsfeld assigned Antarctica to USPACOM. Secretary Rumsfeld also approved the assignment of responsibility for Russia to EUCOM with USPACOM in a supporting role for the Siberia and Russian Far East. Later reassignments under the 2004 and 2006 plans placed the entire Seychelles Archipelago in the USCENTCOM's AOR and extended U.S. Northern Command (USNORTHCOM)'s boundary westward to encompass all of the Aleutian Islands, respectively.

On 24 October 2002, the Secretary issued a memorandum declaring that the title "Commander in Chief" should only refer to the President of the United States. Effective that date, all combatant commanders deleted "in Chief" from their titles. USCINCPAC was redesignated Commander, U.S. Pacific Command (CDRUSPACOM).

=== Transfer of Alaskan Command and missile warning ===
In a move to streamline command and control of forces in Alaska and integrate forces defending North America, Secretary of Defense Chuck Hagel approved the transfer of ALCOM to USNORTHCOM on 1 October 2014.

In 2018, Hawaii newspapers highlighted the role of the command in providing missile warning to the state, after a missile scare. Within PACOM boundaries, PACOM must make the decision that an incoming ballistic missile is a threat to the United States. Hawaii is the only state in the United States with a pre-programmed Wireless Emergency Alert that can be sent quickly to wireless devices if a ballistic missile is heading toward Hawaii. If the missile is fired from North Korea, the missile would take approximately 20 minutes to reach Hawaii. PACOM would take less than 5 minutes to make a determination that the missile could impact Hawaii and would then notify the Hawaii Emergency Management Agency (HI-EMA). HI-EMA would issue the Civil Defense Warning that an inbound missile could impact Hawaii and that people should Shelter in place: Get Inside, Stay Inside, and Stay Tuned. People in Hawaii would have 12 to 15 minutes before impact. The Federal Emergency Management Agency is not required to be notified for approval to cancel an alert. Signal carriers allow people to block alerts from state and law enforcement agencies, but not those issued by the President. FEMA can send alerts to targeted audiences but has not implemented this as of January 2018. Other states can take as long as 30 minutes to create, enter and distribute a missile alert.

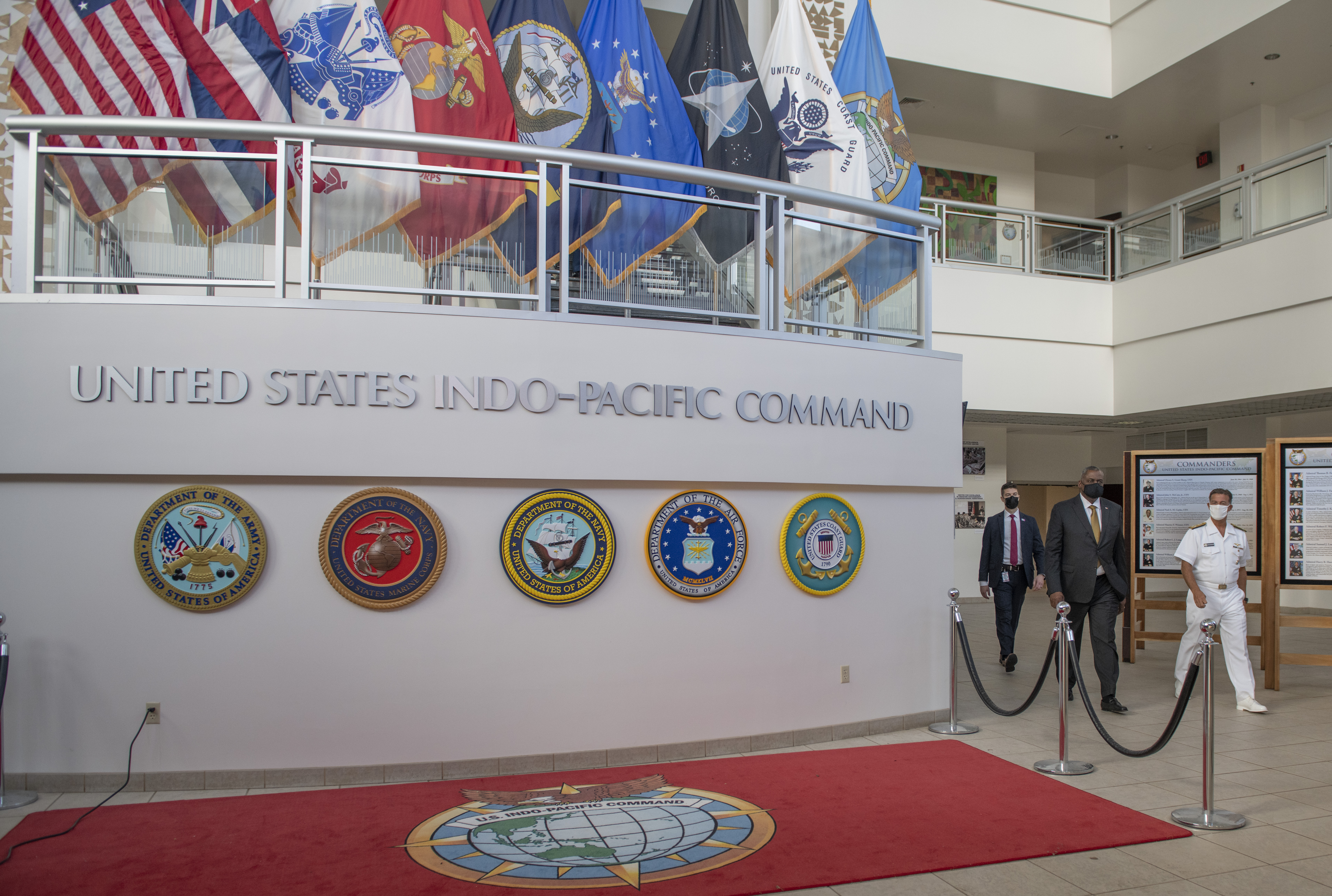
The command was renamed from "Pacific Command" to "Indo-Pacific Command" in 2018.

The Wireless Emergency Alert system was tested nationally for the first time in October 2018.

=== Renaming to Indo-Pacific Command, 2018 ===
Emblem of the United States Indo-Pacific Command from 2018 to 2026.

On 30 May 2018, at the change-of-command ceremony between Admirals Harry B. Harris Jr. and Philip S. Davidson, Defense Secretary Jim Mattis announced that Pacific Command had been renamed Indo-Pacific Command "in recognition of the increasing connectivity of the Indian and Pacific Oceans." The renaming reflected the growing importance of India–United States relations. U.S. officials stated that the change was instituted to "better reflect the command's areas of responsibility, which includes 36 nations as well as both the Pacific and Indian Oceans."

=== Rebranding as Pacific Command, 2026 ===
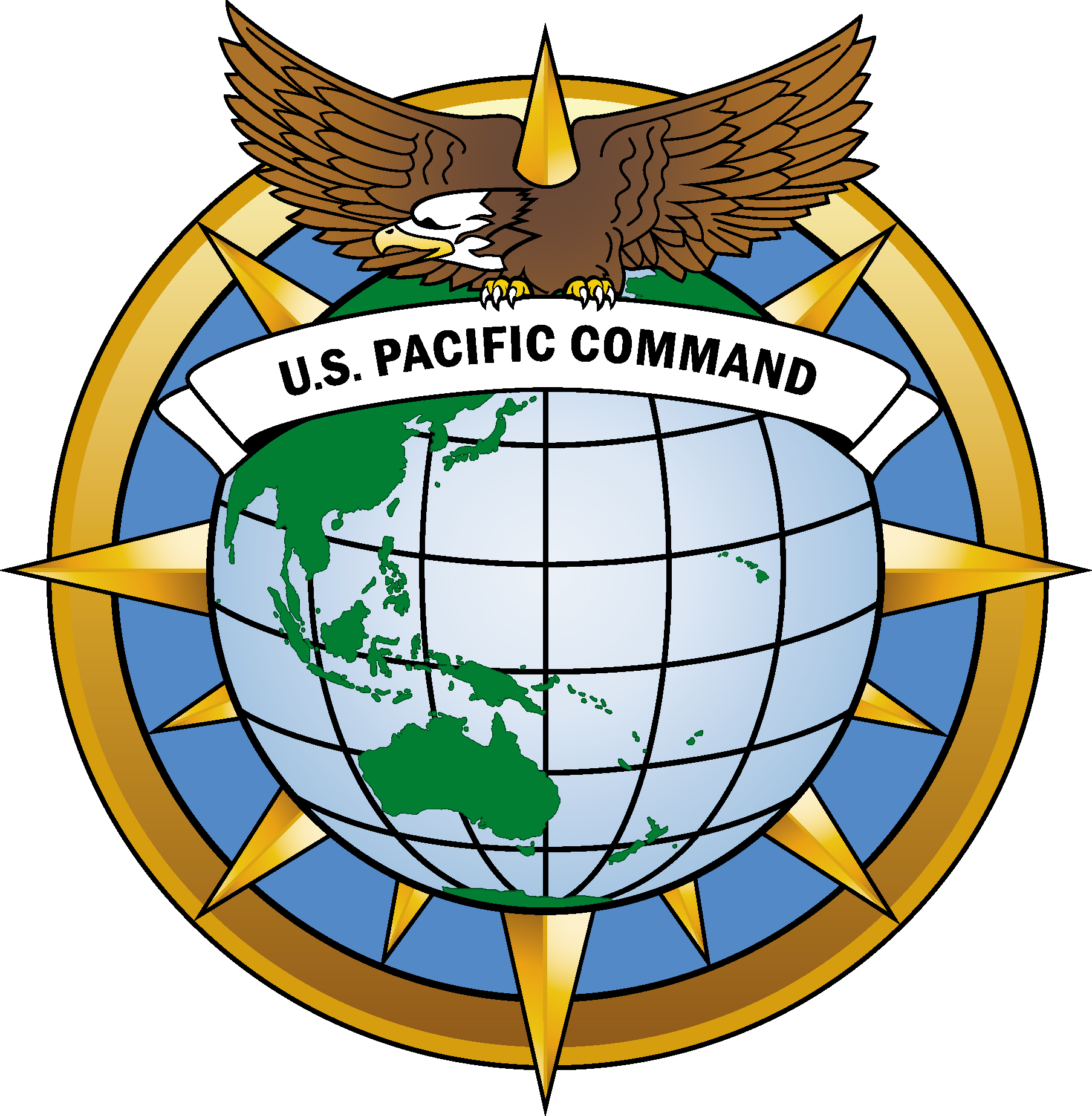
Emblem of the rebranded "United States Pacific Command", unveiled in 2026.

On 16 June 2026, the Department of Defense rebranded the command as the "United States Pacific Command". In a press release, command officials said the return of the old name "honors the command’s deep historical roots, fostering a sense of pride and collective spirit among all who serve in the Pacific."

The name is only a "secondary title" because the command's formal name is set by a 2018 law, Defense Secretary Pete Hegseth said in an internal memo. “Statutory references to United States Indo-Pacific Command shall remain controlling until changed subsequently in law,” the memo says. This is "the same administrative workaround" that Hegseth used to rebrand the Defense Department as the Department of War, the Associated Press wrote.

== List of commanders ==
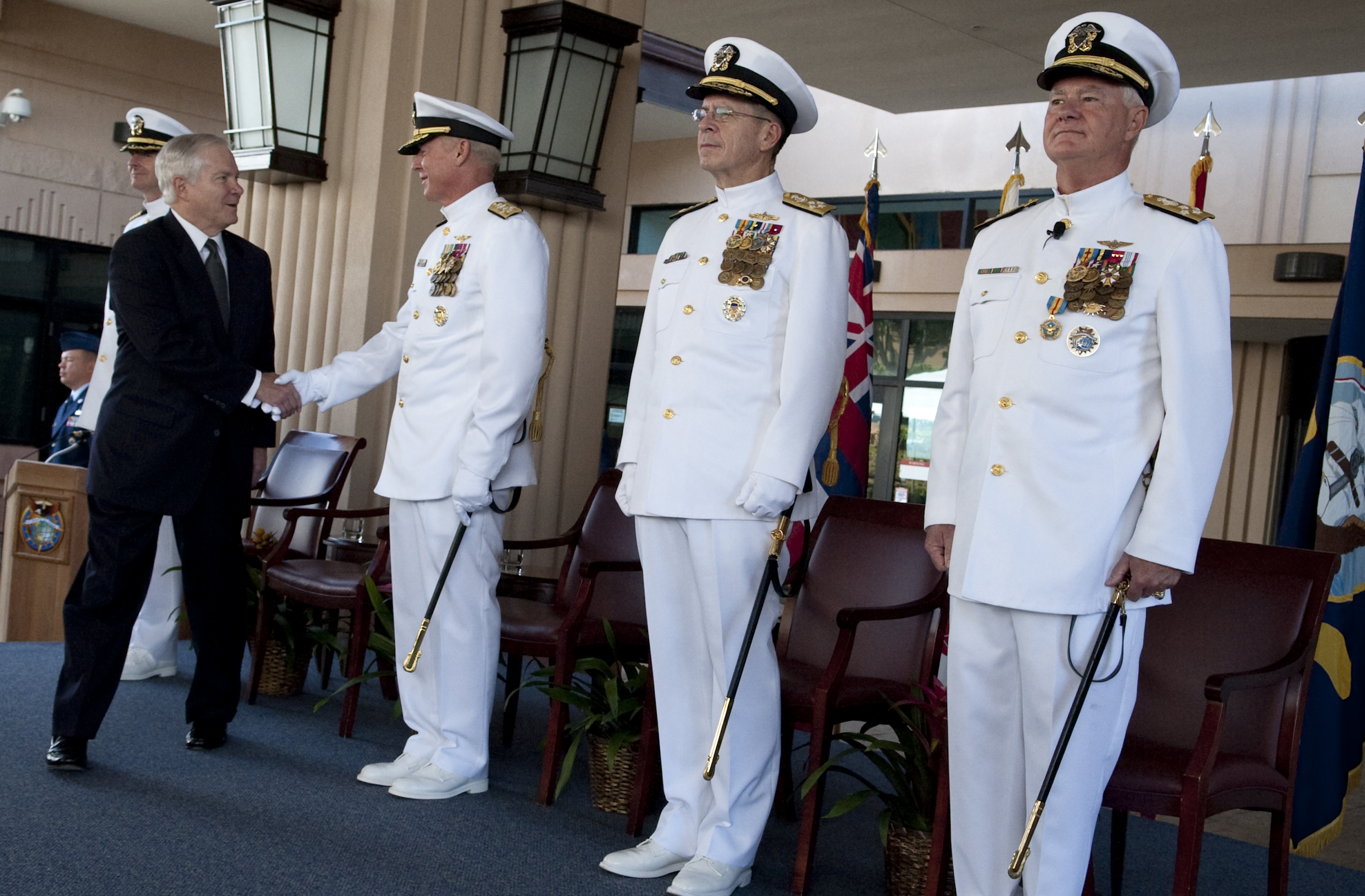
Defense Secretary Robert Gates shakes hands with the incoming PACOM commander, Admiral Robert F. Willard, as Admiral Michael Mullen, chairman of the Joint Chiefs of Staff, and outgoing commander, Admiral Timothy J. Keating look on at the change of command ceremony on 19 October 2009.

While any qualified officer in the U.S. Armed Forces can be appointed as commander of PACOM, only a Navy officer has ever held this office on a permanent basis – Air Force Lieutenant General Daniel P. Leaf was briefly acting commander in March 2007.

No.	Commander		Term			Service branch
No.	Portrait	Name	Took office	Left office	Term length	Service branch
1	John H. Towers	Admiral; John H. Towers (1885–1955)	1 January 1947	28 February 1947	58 days	U.S. Navy
2	Louis E. Denfeld	Admiral; Louis E. Denfeld (1891–1972)	28 February 1947	3 December 1947	278 days	U.S. Navy
3	DeWitt C. Ramsey	Admiral; DeWitt C. Ramsey (1888–1961)	12 January 1948	30 April 1949	1 year, 108 days	U.S. Navy
4	Arthur W. Radford	Admiral; Arthur W. Radford (1896–1973)	30 April 1949	10 July 1953	4 years, 71 days	U.S. Navy
5	Felix B. Stump	Admiral; Felix B. Stump (1894–1972)	10 July 1953	31 July 1958	5 years, 21 days	U.S. Navy
6	Harry D. Felt	Admiral; Harry D. Felt (1902–1992)	31 July 1958	30 June 1964	5 years, 335 days	U.S. Navy
7	Ulysses S. Grant Sharp	Admiral; Ulysses S. Grant Sharp (1906–2001)	30 June 1964	31 July 1968	4 years, 31 days	U.S. Navy
8	John S. McCain Jr.	Admiral; John S. McCain Jr. (1911–1981)	31 July 1968	1 September 1972	4 years, 32 days	U.S. Navy
9	Noel A.M. Gayler	Admiral; Noel A.M. Gayler (1914–2011)	1 September 1972	30 August 1976	3 years, 364 days	U.S. Navy
10	Maurice F. Weisner	Admiral; Maurice F. Weisner (1917–2006)	30 August 1976	31 October 1979	3 years, 62 days	U.S. Navy
11	Robert L.J. Long	Admiral; Robert L.J. Long (1920–2002)	31 October 1979	1 July 1983	3 years, 243 days	U.S. Navy
12	William J. Crowe Jr.	Admiral; William J. Crowe Jr. (1925–2007)	1 July 1983	18 September 1985	2 years, 79 days	U.S. Navy
13	Ronald J. Hays	Admiral; Ronald J. Hays (1928–2021)	18 September 1985	30 September 1988	3 years, 12 days	U.S. Navy
14	Huntington Hardisty	Admiral; Huntington Hardisty (1929–2003)	30 September 1988	1 March 1991	2 years, 152 days	U.S. Navy
15	Charles R. Larson	Admiral; Charles R. Larson (1936–2014)	1 March 1991	11 July 1994	3 years, 132 days	U.S. Navy
16	Richard C. Macke	Admiral; Richard C. Macke (1938–2022)	19 July 1994	31 January 1996	1 year, 196 days	U.S. Navy
17	Joseph W. Prueher	Admiral; Joseph W. Prueher (born 1942)	31 January 1996	20 February 1999	3 years, 20 days	U.S. Navy
18	Dennis C. Blair	Admiral; Dennis C. Blair (born 1947)	20 February 1999	2 May 2002	3 years, 71 days	U.S. Navy
19	Thomas B. Fargo	Admiral; Thomas B. Fargo (born 1948)	2 May 2002	26 February 2005	2 years, 300 days	U.S. Navy
20	William J. Fallon	Admiral; William J. Fallon (born 1944)	26 February 2005	12 March 2007	2 years, 14 days	U.S. Navy
-	Daniel P. Leaf	Lieutenant General; Daniel P. Leaf (born 1952); Acting	12 March 2007	26 March 2007	14 days	U.S. Air Force
21	Timothy J. Keating	Admiral; Timothy J. Keating (born 1948)	26 March 2007	19 October 2009	2 years, 207 days	U.S. Navy
22	Robert F. Willard	Admiral; Robert F. Willard (born 1950)	19 October 2009	9 March 2012	2 years, 142 days	U.S. Navy
23	Samuel J. Locklear III	Admiral; Samuel J. Locklear III (born 1954)	9 March 2012	27 May 2015	3 years, 79 days	U.S. Navy
24	Harry B. Harris Jr.	Admiral; Harry B. Harris Jr. (born 1956)	27 May 2015	30 May 2018	3 years, 3 days	U.S. Navy
25	Philip S. Davidson	Admiral; Philip S. Davidson (born 1960)	30 May 2018	30 April 2021	2 years, 335 days	U.S. Navy
26	John C. Aquilino	Admiral; John C. Aquilino (born 1962)	30 April 2021	3 May 2024	3 years, 3 days	U.S. Navy
27	Samuel Paparo	Admiral; Samuel Paparo (born 1964)	3 May 2024	Incumbent	2 years, 179 days	U.S. Navy
