= Anthony Mastalir =

U.S. Space Force officer

Anthony J. Mastalir
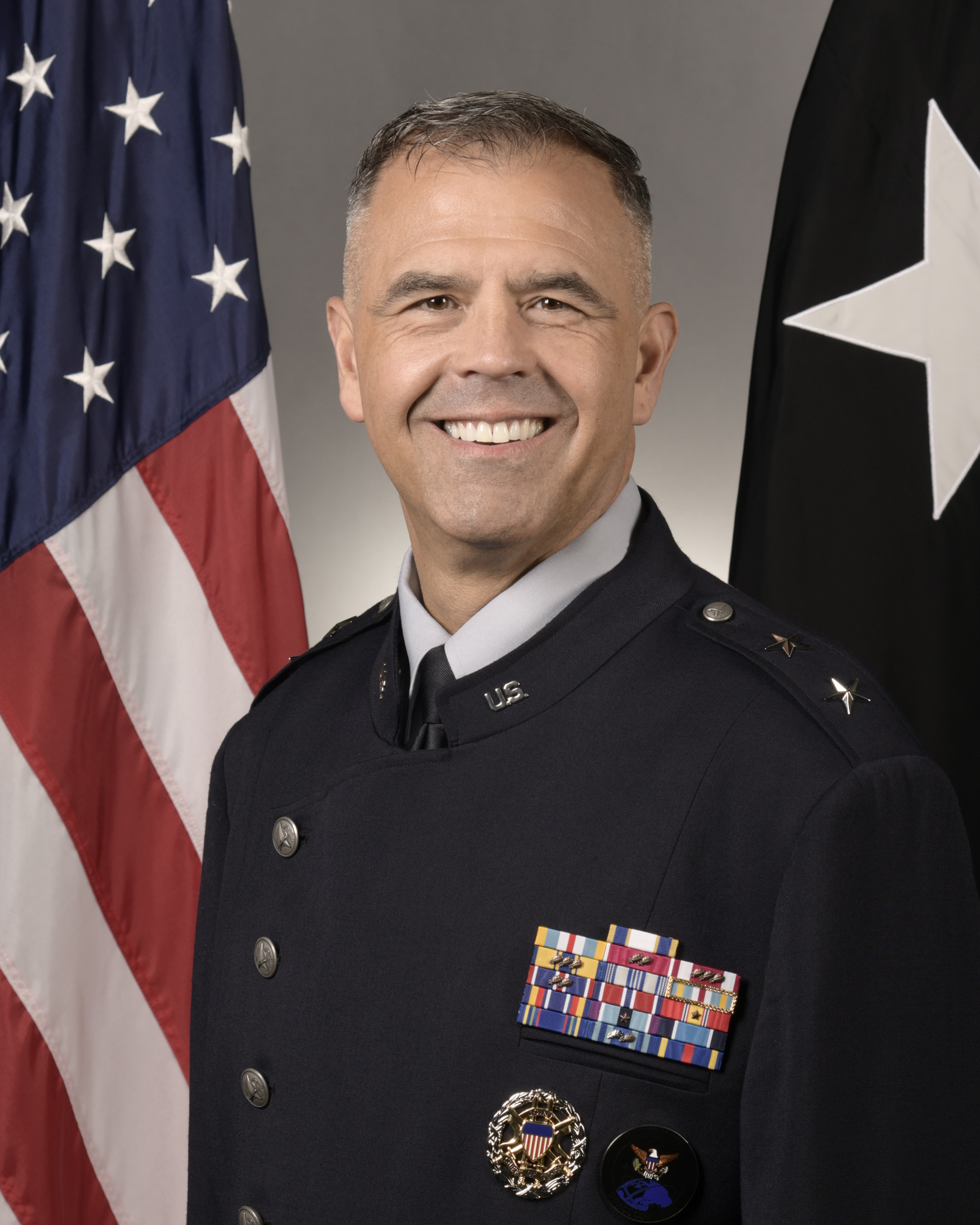
- Official portrait, 2025
- Born: c. 1972 (age 53–54); Green Bay, Wisconsin, U.S.
- Education: Northwestern University (BS): George Washington University
- Spouse: Danielle Patrice Bailey
- Military career
- Allegiance: United States
- Branch: United States Air Force: United States Space Force
- Service years: 1994–2021 (Air Force): 2021–present (Space Force)
- Rank: Major General
- Commands: United States Space Forces Indo-Pacific: Space Launch Delta 30; 30th Space Wing; 595th Operations Support Squadron
- Awards: Defense Superior Service Medal: Legion of Merit (3)

Anthony Joseph Mastalir (born c. 1972) is a United States Space Force major general who has served as the director of global space operations of the United States Space Command since 2025. He previously served as commander of the United States Space Forces Indo-Pacific from 2022 to 2025 and commander of Space Launch Delta 30 from 2019 to 2021.

== Early life and education ==
Born and raised in Green Bay, Wisconsin, Mastalir is the son of Joseph Mastalir and Suzanne Russell. In 1990, he graduated from Preble High School, where he was one of the top students.

Mastalir graduated from Northwestern University in 1994 with a B.S. degree in civil engineering. He later earned several masters degrees from George Washington University, Naval War College, and Air University. He also spent a year as an Air Force research fellow at the RAND Corporation.

== Military career ==
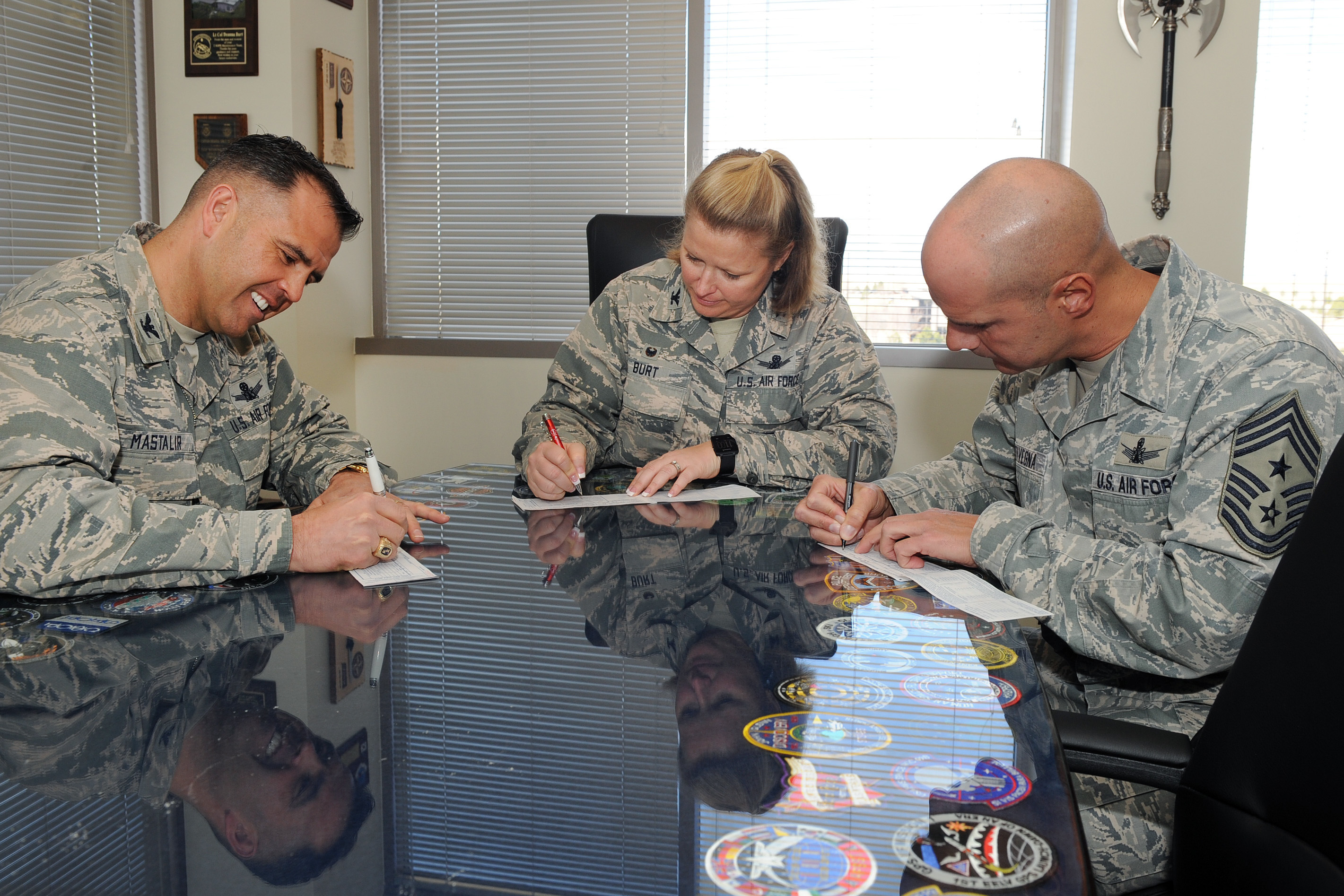
Left to right: Col Mastalir, then-Col DeAnna Burt, and CMSgt John F. Bentivegna completing contribution paperwork for the Air Force Assistance Fund, 2016.

On June 18, 1994, Mastalir entered the United States Air Force when he received his commission as a second lieutenant. His first assignment was as an academic processing officer at an Air Force Reserve Officer Training Corps detachment in Chicago, Illinois. He then underwent a two-month undergraduate space and missile training at the 392nd Combat Training Squadron. In September 2005, he was reassigned to the 5th Space Operations Squadron at the Onizuka Air Station, California. He spent four years there in several capacities, including as satellite procedures officer, flight director, and satellite operations instructor.

Mastalir then went back to the 392nd Combat Training Squadron in 1999 for his missile initial qualification training. Afterwards, he was assigned to Malmstrom Air Force Base, Montana to operate the LGM-30 Minuteman III missile as combat crew commander, instructor, and flight commander for the 564th Missile Squadron. In March 2001, he was selected to work as an Air Force intern assigned to the Air Force headquarters in Washington, D.C. After a year an intern, he was reassigned as a flight commander in the 4th Space Control Squadron at Holloman Air Force Base, New Mexico.

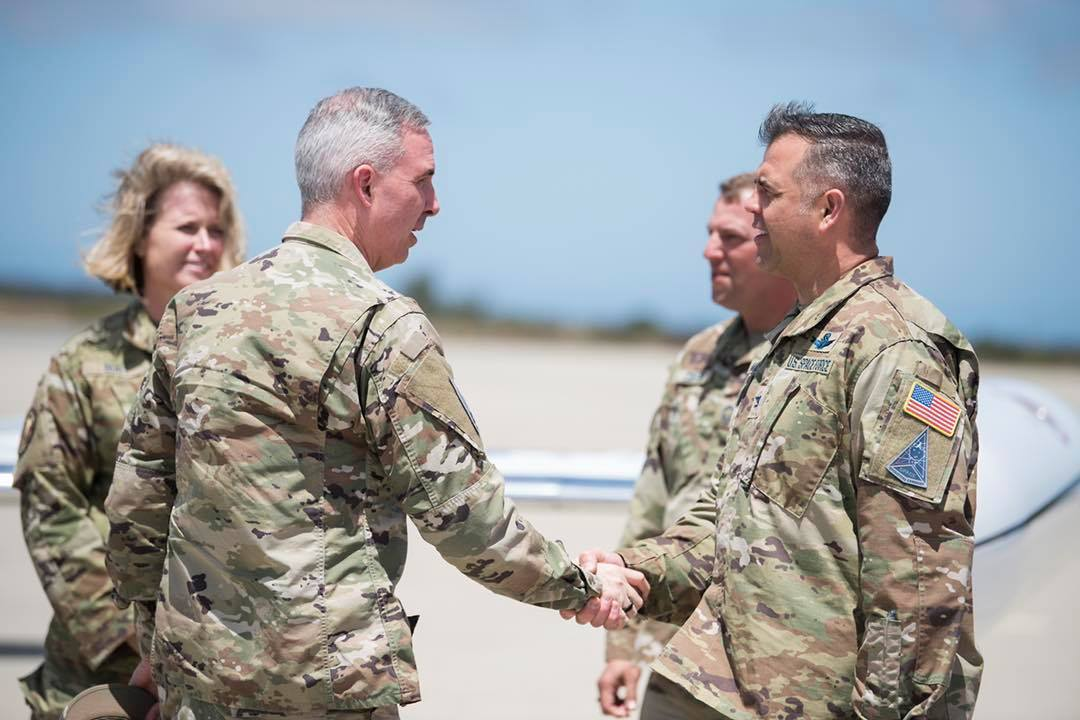
Mastalir (left) speaks to Lt Gen Stephen Whiting (right), 2021.

From 2004 to 2006, Mastalir was assigned to Air Force Space Command, first as chief of space control requirements then as a speechwriter and aide-de-camp to General Lance W. Lord. After his AFSPC tour, he spent two years studying at the College of Naval Command and Staff and School of Advanced Air and Space Studies before promoting to lieutenant colonel.

After promoting to lieutenant colonel, Mastalir was assigned his first command tour, assuming command of the 595th Operations Support Squadron in June 2008. While in that position, he also served as the chief of integration at the Space Innovation and Development Center. After two years of command, he was reassigned to the 595th Space Group as the deputy group commander. He then went on to serve as an Air Force intern at the RAND Corporation for a year.

Mastalir was promoted to colonel in July 2012 and was assigned at the Joint Staff as the chief of the space and missile division. In July 2014, he became the assistant deputy director for global policy and partnerships. After his four-year stint at the Joint Staff, he was transferred to Schriever Air Force Base as the vice commander of the 50th Space Wing. In July 2017, he was reassigned as the deputy director of the Space Security and Defense Program.

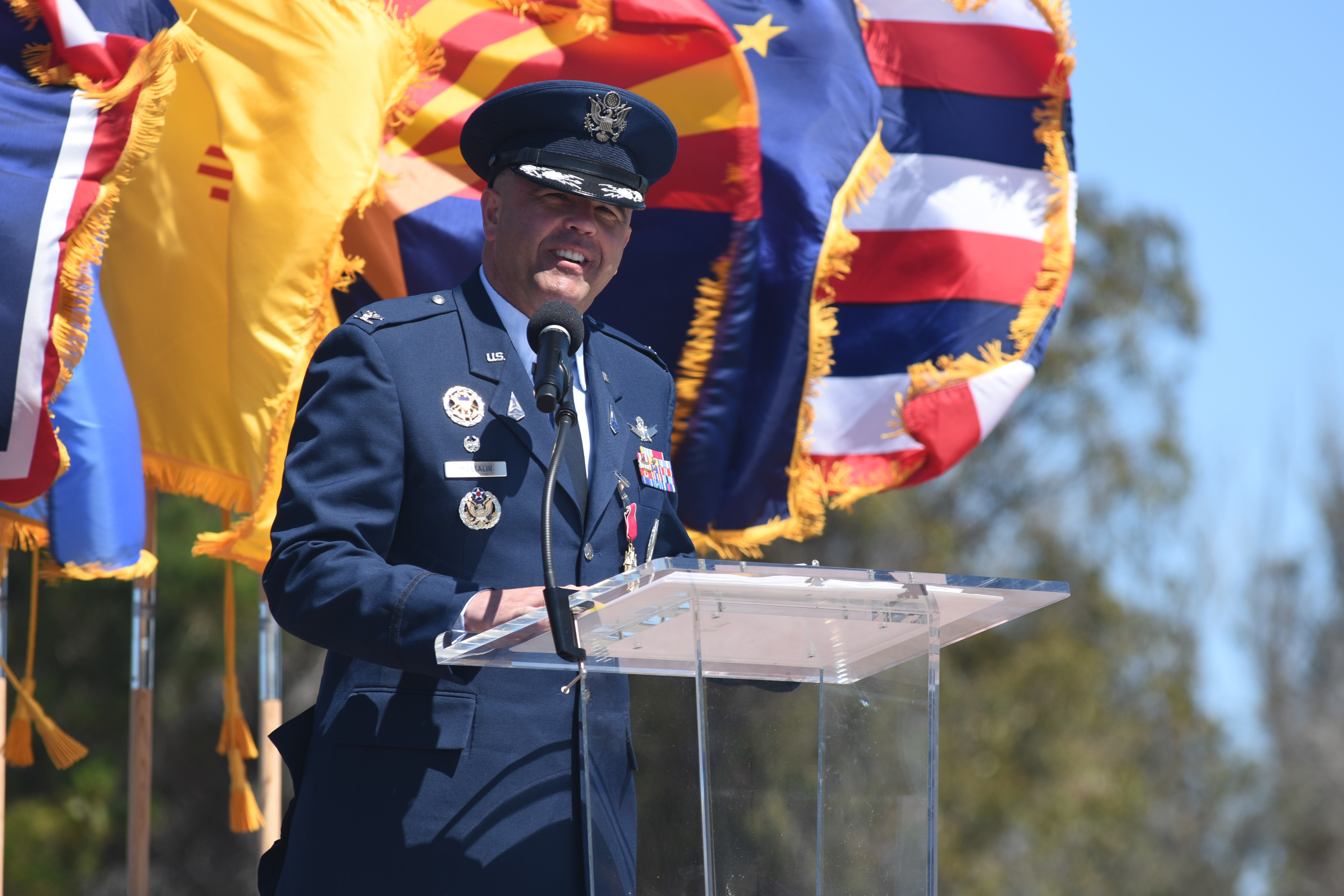
Mastalir, outgoing Space Launch Delta 30 commander, addresses the SLD 30, during a change of command ceremony, 2021.

On July 12, 2019, Mastalir took command of the 30th Space Wing, at Vandenberg Air Force Base. He transferred to the Space Force on May 14, 2021, on the same date that the 30th Space Wing was redesignated as Space Launch Delta 30. In May 2022, he returned to Vandenberg as special assistant to Combined Force Space Component Command Commanders Major Generals DeAnna Burt and Douglas Schiess.

Mastalir played an active role in standing up Space Force component field commands. After relinquishing command of Space Launch Delta 30, he was reassigned as director of space forces of the United States Air Forces Central Command, working to standup the United States Space Forces Central (USSPACEFORCENT) in Qatar. USSPACEFORCENT was supposed to be the first Space Force component command to a geographical combatant command, but it became the next priority after the Space Force component command to the United States Indo-Pacific Command as priorities changed. On 22 November 2022, he took command of the first Space Force component field command, the United States Space Forces Indo-Pacific.

In April 2022, Mastalir was nominated for promotion to brigadier general.

== Awards and decorations ==
Mastalir is the recipient of the following awards:

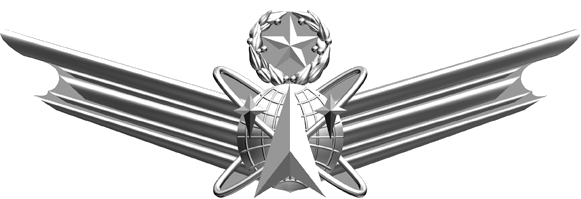
Command Space Operations Badge

Basic Missile Operations Badge

Office of the Joint Chiefs of Staff Identification Badge

Air Staff Badge

Defense Superior Service Medal
Legion of Merit with two bronze oak leaf clusters
Meritorious Service Medal with three bronze oak leaf clusters
Air Force Commendation Medal with three bronze oak leaf clusters
Air Force Achievement Medal
Joint Meritorious Unit Award
Air Force Outstanding Unit Award with two bronze oak leaf clusters
Air Force Organizational Excellence Award
National Defense Service Medal with one bronze service star
Global War on Terrorism Service Medal
Humanitarian Service Medal with one bronze service star
Remote Combat Effects Campaign Medal
Nuclear Deterrence Operations Service Medal
Air Force Longevity Service Award with one silver and one bronze oak leaf clusters
Air Force Training Ribbon

== Personal life ==
Mastalir is married to Danielle Patrice Bailey of Atlanta, Georgia. The couple has a daughter and a son.

== Dates of promotion ==
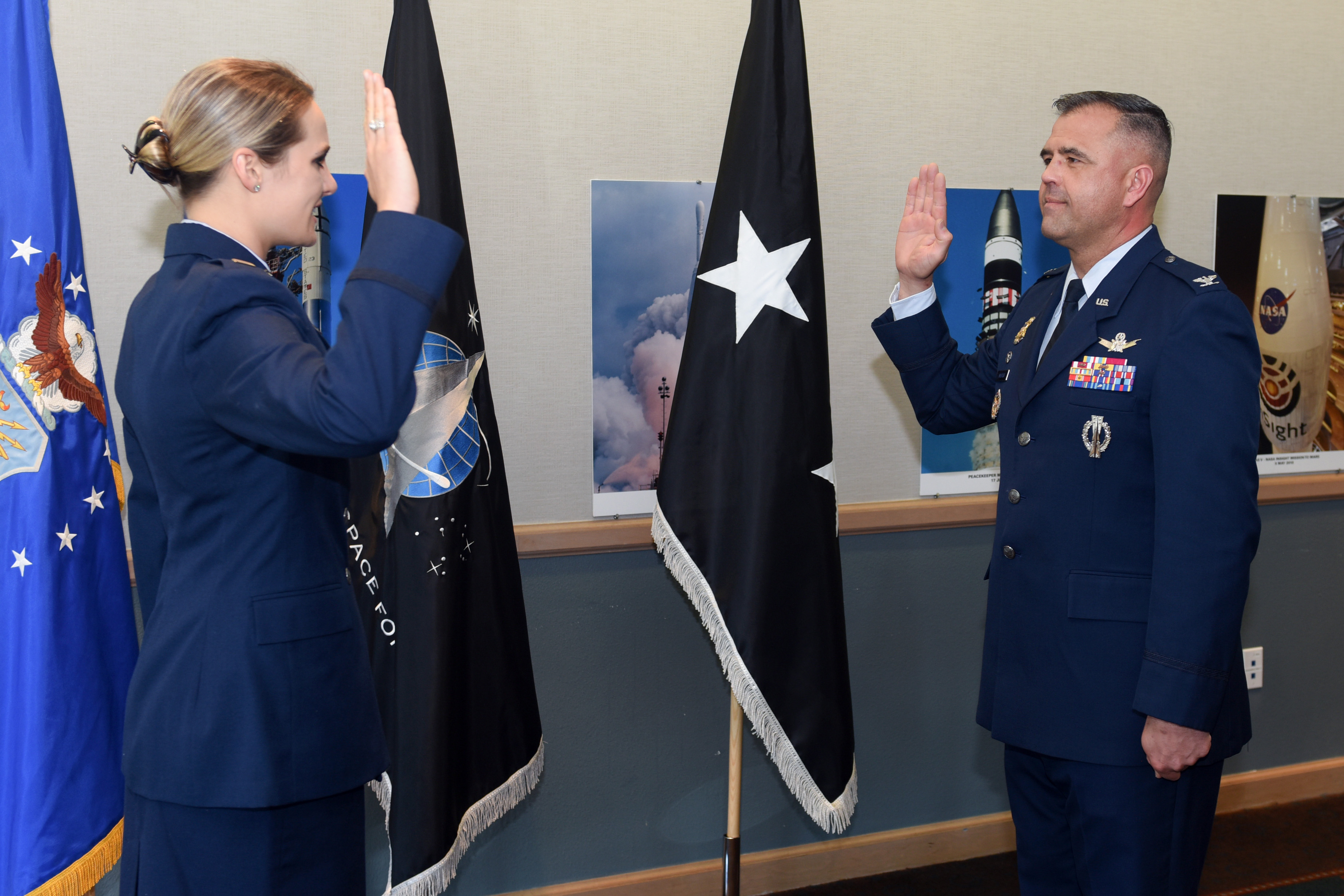
2nd Lt Olivia Gilliagham (left), one of the first members of the U.S. Space Force, swears in Mastalir (right) into the Space Force during a transfer ceremony, May 14, 2021.

Rank	Branch	Date
Second Lieutenant	Air Force	June 18, 1994
First Lieutenant	Air Force	July 15, 1996
Captain	Air Force	July 15, 1998
Major	Air Force	December 1, 2004
Lieutenant Colonel	Air Force	June 1, 2008
Colonel	Air Force	July 1, 2012
Colonel	Space Force	~September 30, 2020
Brigadier General	Space Force	October 1, 2022
Major General	Space Force	July 25, 2025

== Writings ==
- Space Force Service Components: Join the Fight
- "The PRC Challenge to US Space Assets in Chinese Aerospace Power: Evolving Maritime Roles". Naval Institute Press. 2011.
- "The US Response to China's ASAT Test: An International Security Space Alliance for the Future" (PDF). Drew Paper (8). August 2009.

Military offices
Preceded by George R. Farfour	Commander of the 595th Operations Support Squadron; 2008–2010	Succeeded by ???
Preceded by Eugene Caughey	Vice Commander of the 50th Space Wing; 2015–2017	Succeeded by Jacob Middleton Jr.
Preceded by ???	Deputy Director of the Space Security and Defense Program; 2017–2019	Succeeded by Todd R. Moore
Preceded by Michael S. Hough	Commander of the 30th Space Wing, later Space Launch Delta 30; 2019–2021	Succeeded by Robert A. Long
Preceded by Robert Schreiner	Director of Space Forces of the United States Air Forces Central Command; 2021–2022	Succeeded by Christopher S. Putnam
New office	Commander of the United States Space Forces Indo-Pacific; 2022–2025	Succeeded by Brian Denaro
Preceded by Troy Endicott	Director of Global Space Operations of the United States Space Command; 2025–present	Vacant
