= United States Space Forces – Indo-Pacific =

- USSPACEFOR-INDOPAC emblem
- Founded: 22 November 2022; 47 months
- Country: United States
- Branch: United States Space Force
- Type: Component field command
- Role: Space operations
- Size: 21 personnel
- Part of: United States Indo-Pacific Command
- Headquarters: Joint Base Pearl Harbor–Hickam, Hawaii

Commanders
- Commander: Brig Gen Brian Denaro
- Deputy Commander: Col Jay M. Steingold
- Command Senior Enlisted Leader: CMSgt Jason Childers

Insignia
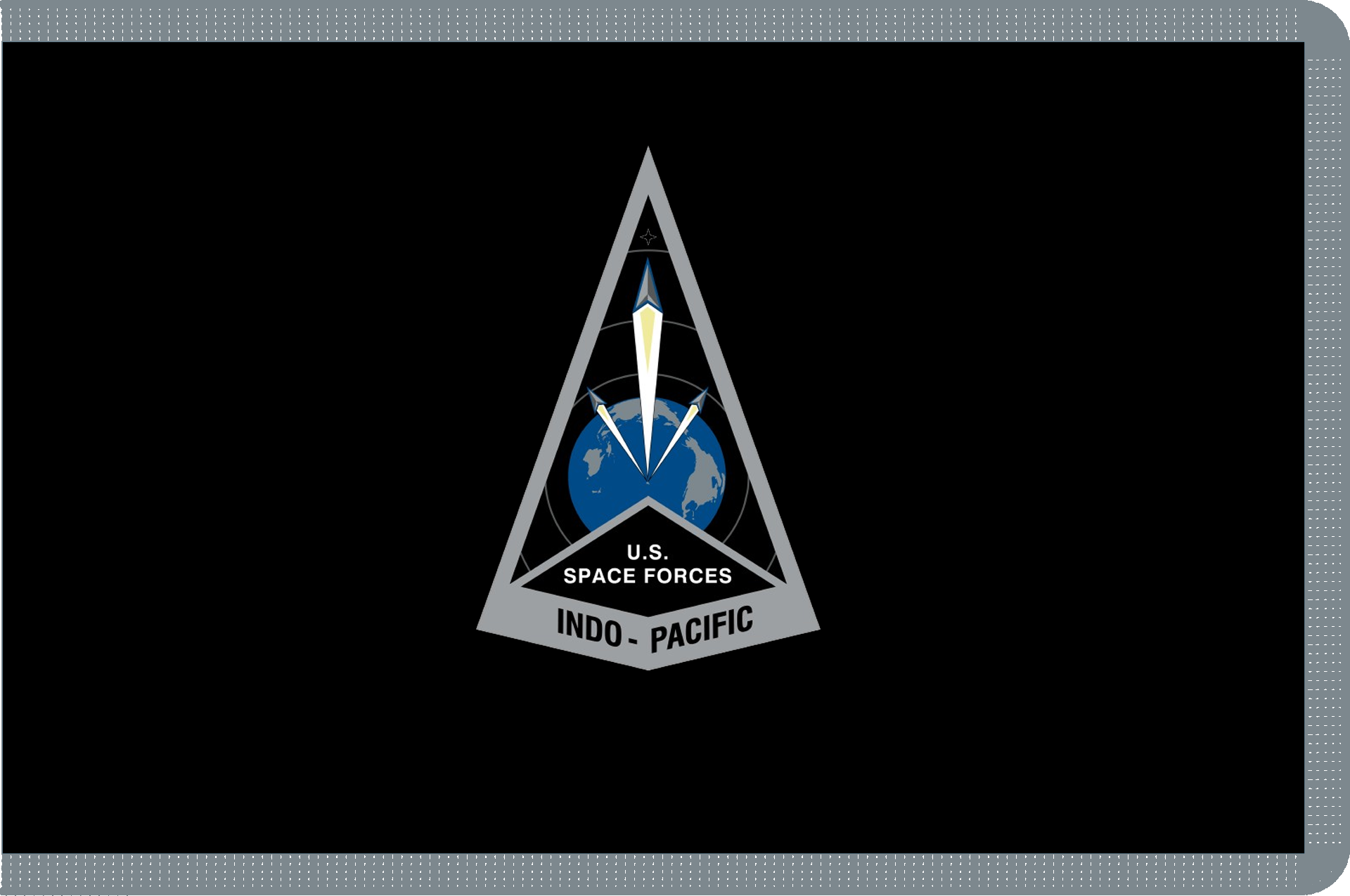
- Flag of the Space Forces Indo-Pacific Command

The United States Space Forces – Indo-Pacific (USSPACEFOR-INDOPAC) is the United States Space Force component field command to the United States Indo-Pacific Command. It plans, coordinates, supports, and conducts employment of space operations across the full range of military operations, including security cooperation, in support of the combatant command's objectives. It was activated on 22 November 2022.

== History ==
=== Director of Space Forces, Pacific Air Forces ===
USSPACEFOR-INDOPAC's presence in the United States Indo-Pacific Command traces back to the director of space forces (DIRSPACEFOR) construct before the establishment of the Space Force. When the Space Force was still Air Force Space Command, there would be a space operations officer called the DIRSPACEFOR in every air service component command that would advise the air component commander on matters relating to space operations. As such, there was a director of space forces assigned to Pacific Air Forces. During the standup of USSPACEFOR-INDOPAC, the DIRSPACEFOR staff became the new component command staff and Col Anthony J. Zilinsky III became the last director of space forces to Pacific Air Forces.

==== List of director of space forces ====
- Col Christopher S. Putnam, July 2018 – July 2020
- Col Anthony J. Zilinsky III, October 2020 – November 2022

=== Establishment ===
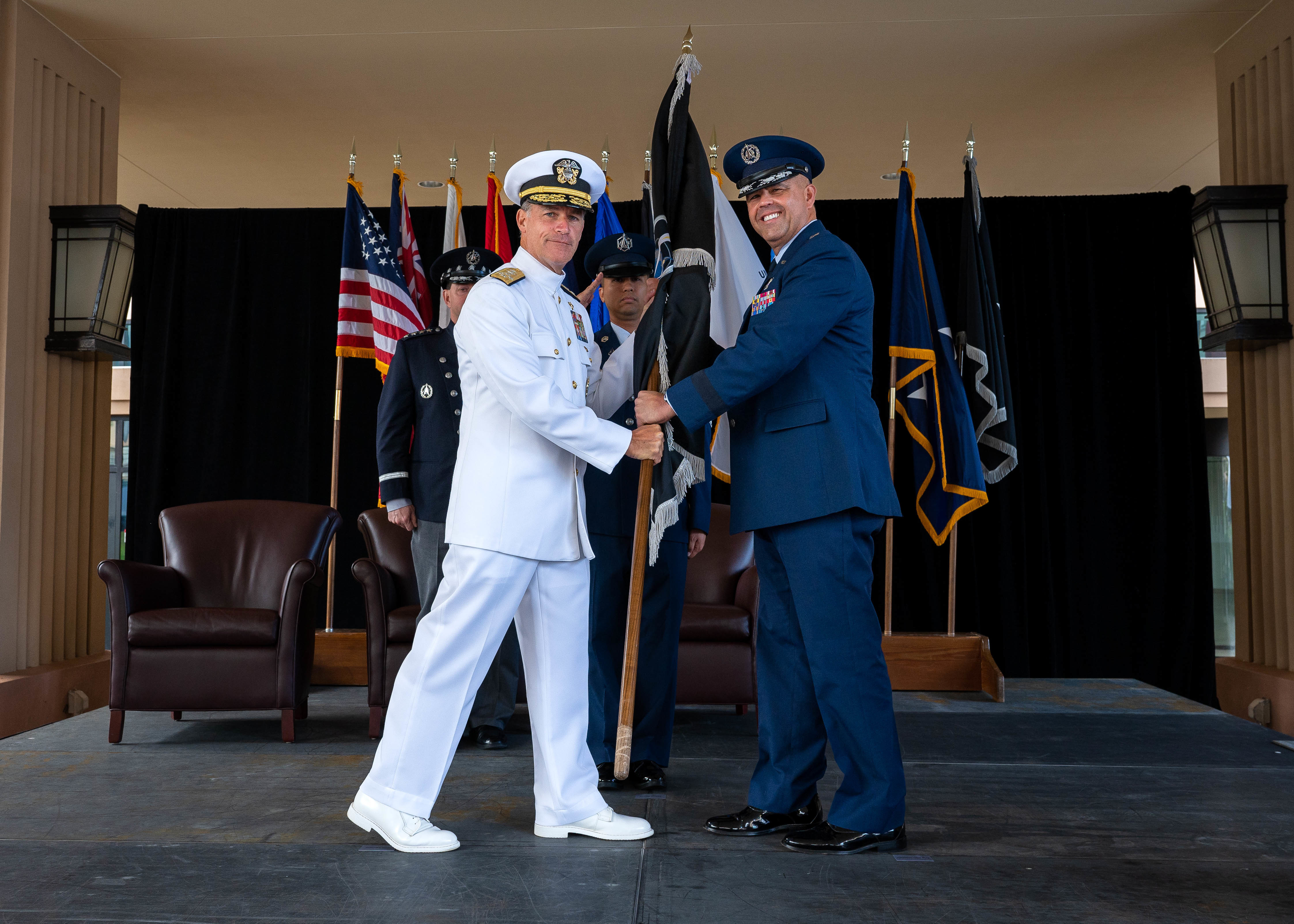
Admiral Aquilino hands over the U.S. Space Forces Indo-Pacific flag to Brig Gen Mastalir during the activation ceremony on 25 October 2022

Initial plans for establishment of Space Force component field commands started in 2021 when then Colonel Anthony Mastalir was assigned as director of space forces at the Ninth Air Force and stand up the United States Space Forces Central (USSPACEFOR-CENT). USSPACEFOR-CENT was supposed to be the first Space Force component field command. In November 2021, Secretary Frank Kendall III approved the creation of Space Force elements in U.S. European Command, U.S. Central Command, and U.S. Indo-Pacific Command, but establishing those elements as component commands required Joint Chiefs of Staff approval.

By May 2022, plans were changed to first establish the USSPACEFORINDOPAC due to China being the pacing threat. "We very deliberately chose INDOPACOM first because we want the nation, the Department of Defense, that combatant command, and anyone who might wish us harm in that region to understand that's what we pay attention to every single day," said General David D. Thompson after the command's activation.

On 25 October 2022, Thompson announced that the USSPACEFOR-INDOPAC would be established on 22 November 2022, with Mastalir taking the helm as its first commander. It would be the Space Force's first component field command, followed by the standup of component field commands in United States Central Command and United States Forces Korea. According to Mastalir, USSPACEFOR-INDOPAC would be initially composed of less than 100 Space Force personnel. For its first six months, the command would focus on mission analysis and planning.

In a ceremony on 22 November 2022, USSPACEFOR-INDOPAC was activated. Admiral John C. Aquilino handed over the unit flag to Mastalir who assumed as the first commander of USSPACEFOR-INDOPAC.

USSPACEFOR-INDOPAC had a supporting role in Operation Epic Fury during the Iran war that began on 28 February 2026.

== Structure ==
United States Space Forces Indo-Pacific (USSPACEFOR-INDOPAC), Joint Base Pearl Harbor–Hickam, Hawaii

- United States Space Forces Korea (SPACEFOR-KOR), Osan Air Base, South Korea
- United States Space Forces Japan (SPACEFOR-JPN), Yokota Air Base, Japan

== Heraldry ==
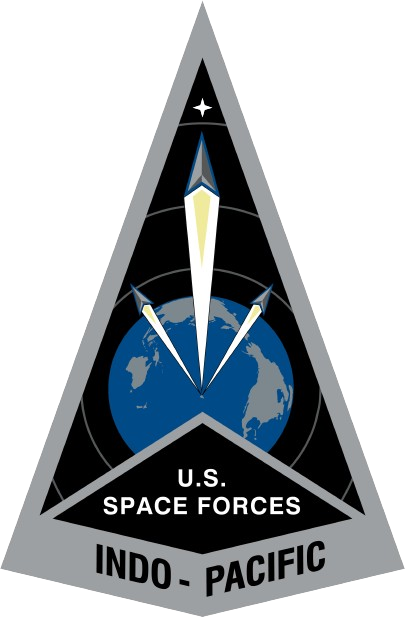
U.S. Space Forces – Indo-Pacific emblem

=== Emblem ===
The USSPACEFOR-INDOPAC emblem has the following symbolism:

- The North Star, Polaris, positioned at the delta's apex, reflects the Space Force's mantra, "Semper Supra," which means "always above."
- Four points mark character, connection, commitment, and courage, the four cornerstones of the Space Force's Guardian Ideal.
- Three deltas emanate from the field command's terrestrial home and represent the Spacepower disciplines of orbital warfare, space battle management, and space electronic warfare, each outlined in Victory Blue, attributed to the service's Air Force heritage.
- Gray rings and circles encircling the globe represent the primary orbits on which Guardians operate.
- The black field symbolizes the infinity of space, representing that there are no limits to what Guardians can achieve.

== List of commanders ==
No.	Commander		Term			Ref
No.	Portrait	Name	Took office	Left office	Term length	Ref
1	Anthony Mastalir	Brigadier General; Anthony Mastalir (born c. 1972)	22 November 2022	25 July 2025	2 years, 245 days	
2	Brian Denaro	Brigadier General; Brian Denaro (born c. 1978)	25 July 2025	Incumbent	1 year, 94 days	-

== See also ==
- United States Indo-Pacific Command
- United States Space Force
- Pacific Air Forces
