= Brian Denaro =

U.S. Space Force officer (born c.1978)

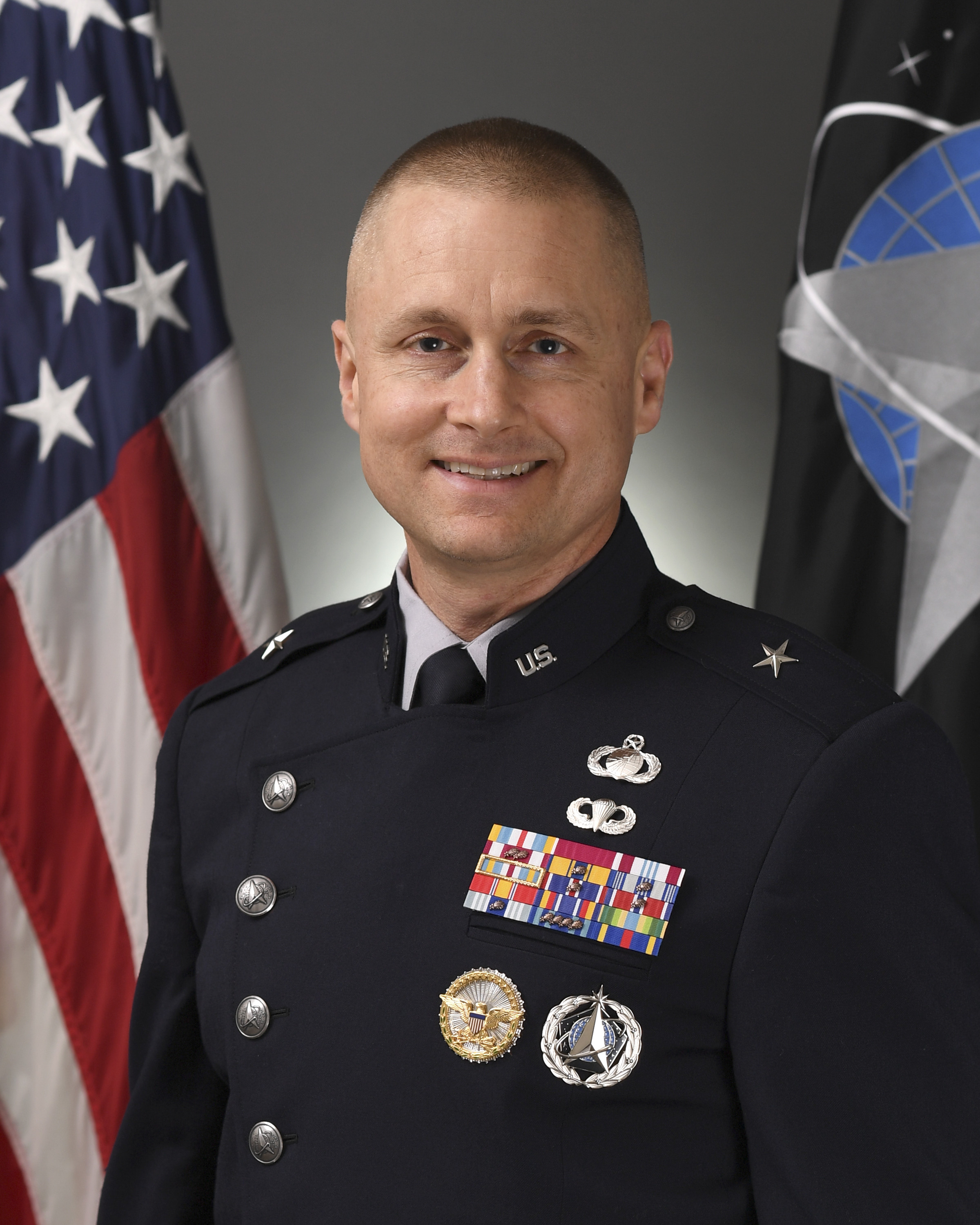
- Official portrait, 2024
- Born: c. 1978 (age 47–48); Long Grove, Illinois, U.S.
- Education: United States Air Force Academy (BA); Sun Yat-sen University (MBA)
- Military career
- Allegiance: United States
- Branch: United States Air Force: United States Space Force
- Service years: 2000–2020 (Air Force): 2020–present (Space Force)
- Rank: Brigadier General
- Commands: United States Space Forces Indo-Pacific; Space Sensing Directorate; Space Development Corps; Strategic Systems Division; Aircraft Analysis Squadron
- Awards: Defense Superior Service Medal

Brian Angelo Denaro (born c. 1978) is a United States Space Force brigadier general who serves as the commander of the United States Space Forces Indo-Pacific. He previously served as the director of plans and programs of the Space Force and senior military assistant to the under secretary of the Air Force.

Denaro was born and raised in Long Grove, Illinois. He entered the United States Air Force after graduating from the United States Air Force Academy. An Olmsted Scholar, he studied in Guangzhou, China. In the Air Force, he was a career foreign area officer, serving several intelligence and international affairs assignments in the United States Pacific Command. He commanded the National Air and Space Intelligence Center's Aircraft Analysis Squadron from 2013 to 2015. He then transitioned to the acquisition career field, working on RQ-4 Global Hawk acquisitions before getting assigned at the Space and Missile Systems Center.

In 2021, Denaro transferred to the Space Force, where he served as the first program executive officer space sensing and director of SSC's Space Sensing Directorate. During his tenure, he led the completion of the Space-Based Infrared System. In 2024, he was nominated for promotion to brigadier general.

== Early life and education ==
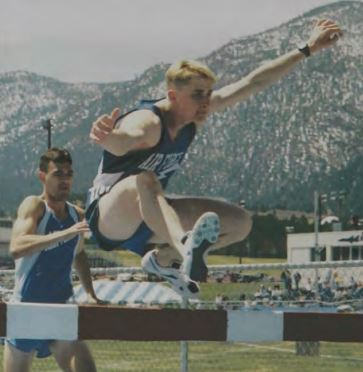
Denaro at a steeplechase race, 1997

Denaro was born and raised in Long Grove, Illinois. He finished high school from Stevenson High School. In 2000, he graduated from the United States Air Force Academy with a B.S. degree in electrical engineering. As an Olmsted Scholar, he received an International Master of Business Administration from the Sun Yat-sen University in Guangzhou, China. As part of his professional military education, he also attended the Air and Space Basic Course, Squadron Officer School, Air Command and Staff College, Joint Forces Staff College, and National War College.

== Military career ==
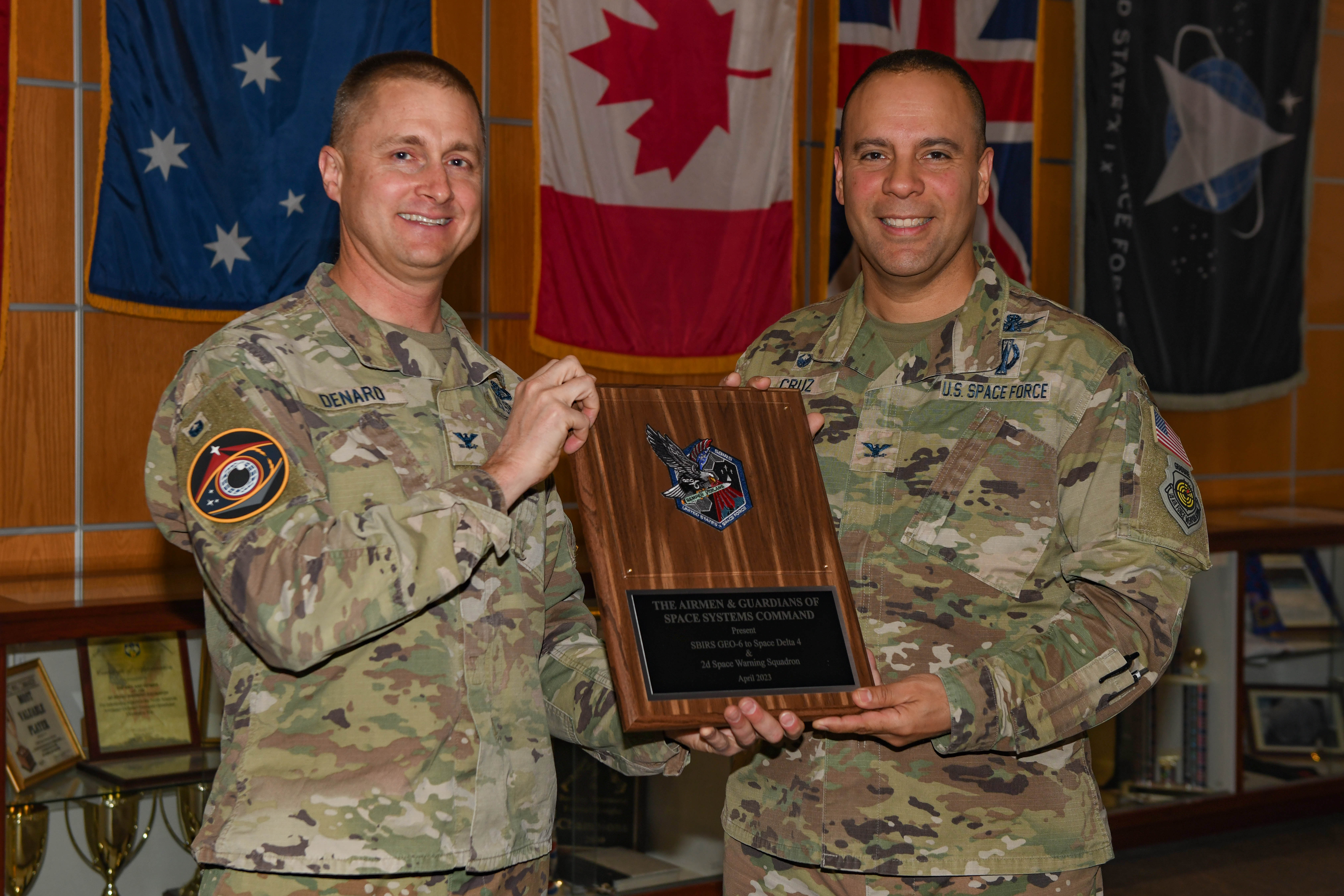
Denaro handing a plaque symbolizing the transfer of SBIRS GEO-6 to Space Delta 4, 2022

On June 6, 2000, Denaro was commissioned into the United States Air Force after graduating from the United States Air Force Academy. His first assignment was at Yokota Air Base, Japan, from 2000 to 2003, where he served as a scientific and technical intelligence collection officer with the 315th Intelligence Squadron for two years. After that, he assigned to the Detachment 4, 692nd Information Operations Group as the chief of overt collection.

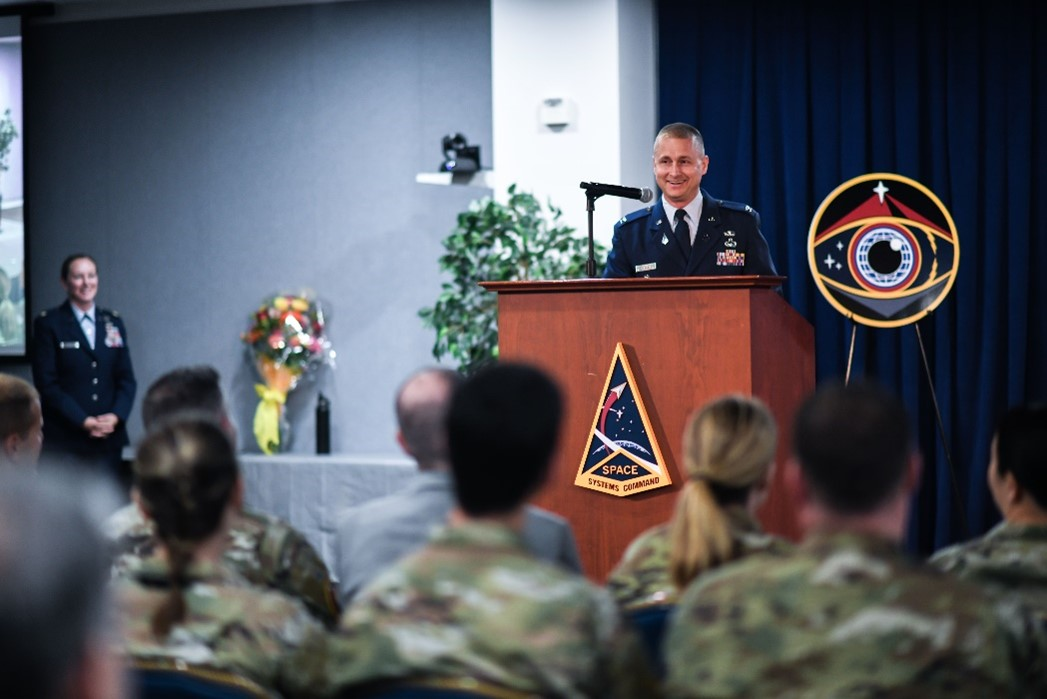
Denaro speaks after relinquishing authority of the Space Sensing Directorate, 2023

In 2005, he moved back to the U.S., assigned as an F-22 aeronautical test engineer with the 31st Test and Evaluation Squadron (31 TES) at Edwards Air Force Base, California. During his time at the 31 TES, the squadron successfully executed the initial operational test and evaluation of the F-22 Raptor. After that, he was selected as an Olmsted Scholar. From 2005 to 2008, he studied at Sun Yat-sen University in Guangzhou, China.

After finishing his studies in China, Denaro was assigned to Hawaii from 2008 to 2013. He was first assigned as China-Japan regional affairs specialist at the Pacific Air Forces for two years. Afterward, he was assigned with the United States Pacific Command, first as an aide-de-camp to the commander, Admiral Robert F. Willard, and then as a program manager at the command's Strategic Capabilities Office.

Denaro was assigned at Wright-Patterson Air Force Base, Ohio, for three years after his Hawaii tour. From 2013 to 2015, he commanded the National Air and Space Intelligence Center's Air Analysis Squadron. For a year after that, he served as chief of Global Hawk Modernization with the Air Force Life Cycle Management Center's RQ-4 System Program Office. Denaro was assigned to the Pentagon from 2017 to 2019 as deputy director for special programs at the office of the under secretary of defense for intelligence.

From 2019 to 2023, Denaro was assigned at Los Angeles Air Force Base, California, with the Space and Missile Systems Center (SMC). He served as the senior materiel leader for the Strategic Systems Division, Development Corps for two years. During this time, he was nominated and confirmed to transfer to the United States Space Force. After serving as senior materiel leader, he was promoted as the program executive officer (PEO) for development and director of SMC's Development Corps. Less than a year after, SMC was redesignated as Space Systems Command (SSC) and several organizational changes were implemented. In 2022, was selected to serve as the first PEO for space sensing and director of SSC's Space Sensing Directorate. Additionally, he served as the head of the newly-formed Combined Program Office, a tri-agency composed of representatives from SSC, the Space Development Agency, and the Missile Defense Agency to coordinate acquisition on missile warning, missile tracking, and missile defense capabilities.

In June 2023, Denaro relinquished command of the Space Sensing Directorate and moved to the Pentagon to serve as senior military assistant to the under secretary of the Air Force. As the Space Sensing Directorate director, he led the completion of the Space-Based Infrared System with the operational acceptance of the last satellite. The directorate also developed the medium Earth orbit missile track custody program.

In January 2024, Denaro was nominated for promotion to brigadier general. He was reassigned as the director of plans and programs of the Space Force in July 2024.

== Personal life ==
Denaro's father helped design and launch the first GPS satellite.

== Awards and decorations ==
Atwood is the recipient of the following awards:

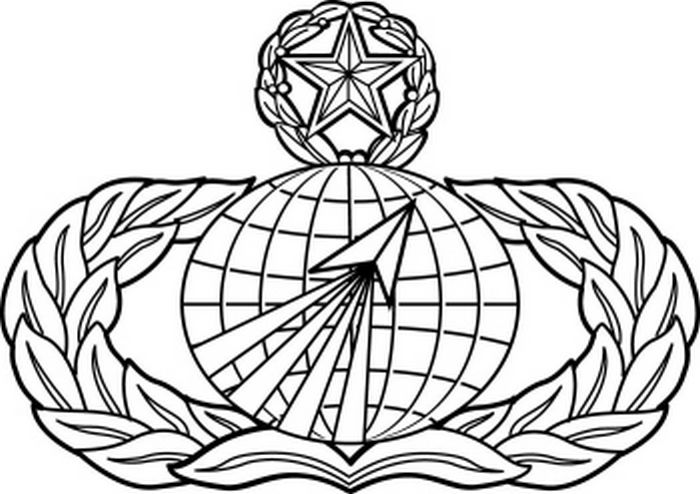

Air Force Master Acquisition and Financial Management Badge

Basic Parachutist Badge

Office of the Secretary of Defense Badge

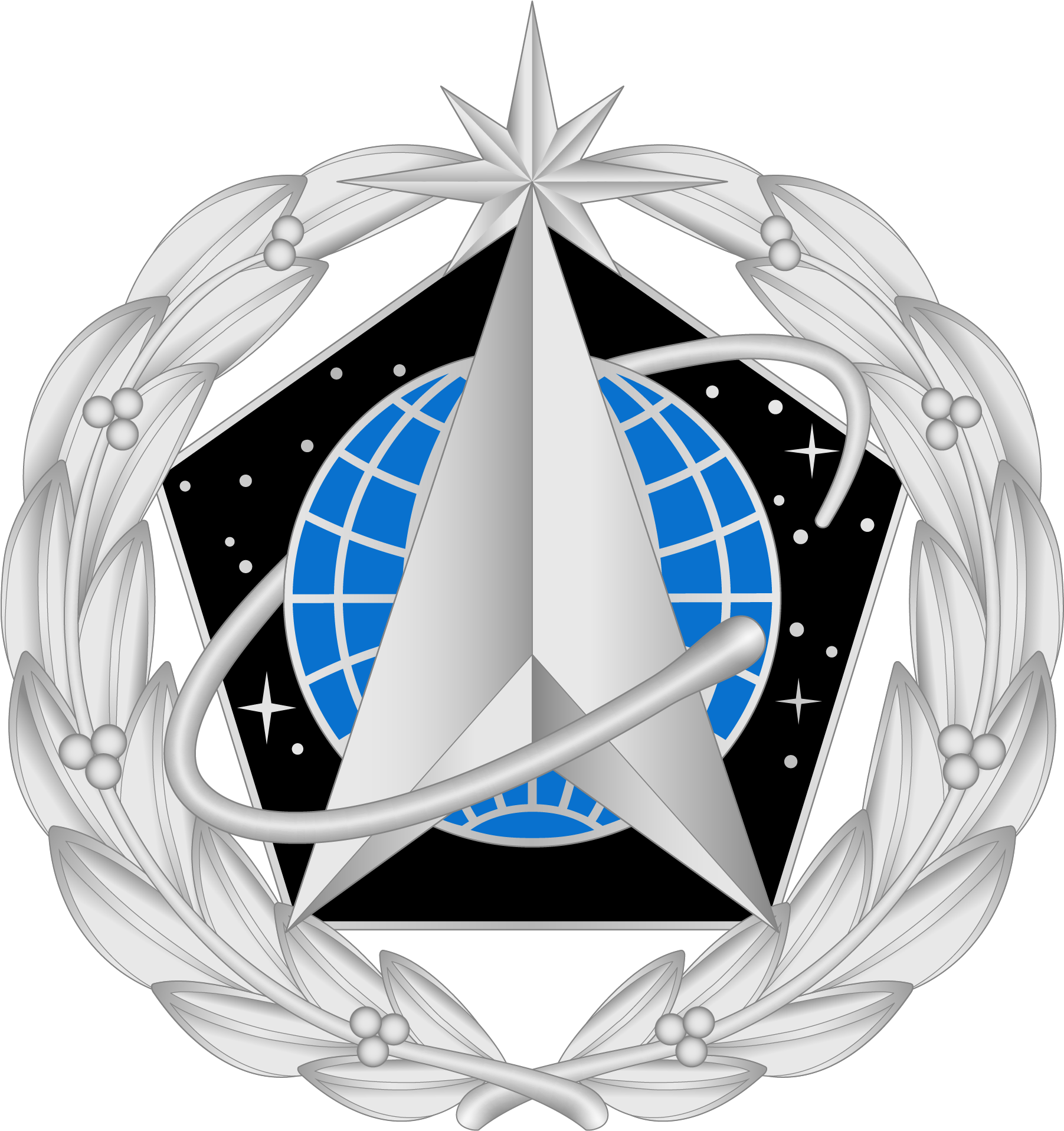

Space Staff Badge

Defense Superior Service Medal
Legion of Merit
Meritorious Service Medal
Meritorious Service Medal with two bronze oak leaf clusters
Air Force Commendation Medal with one bronze oak leaf cluster
Air Force Achievement Medal with one bronze oak leaf cluster
Joint Meritorious Unit Award
Air Force Outstanding Unit Award with one bronze oak leaf cluster
Air Force Organizational Excellence Award with one bronze oak leaf cluster
National Defense Service Medal
Global War on Terrorism Service Medal
Armed Forces Service Medal
Air Force Overseas Long Tour Service Ribbon with one bronze oak leaf cluster
Air Force Longevity Service Award with four bronze oak leaf clusters
Air Force Training Ribbon

- Air Force Outstanding Junior Engineer of the Year (2004)
- Foreign Area Officer Association Writing Award for Excellence in International Affairs (2018)
- Air & Space Forces Association Lt Gen John W. O'Neil Award (2023)

== Dates of promotion ==
Rank	Branch	Date
Second Lieutenant	Air Force	June 6, 2000
First Lieutenant	Air Force	June 6, 2002
Captain	Air Force	June 6, 2004
Major	Air Force	January 1, 2010
Lieutenant Colonel	Air Force	December 1, 2013
Colonel	Air Force	May 1, 2018
Colonel	Space Force	~June 24, 2021
Brigadier General	Space Force	February 1, 2024

Military offices
Preceded by Timothy Sejba	Program Executive Officer for Space Development of Space Systems Command; 2021–2022	Unit inactivated
New unit	Program Executive Officer for Space Sensing of Space Systems Command; 2022–2023	Succeeded by Robert W. Davis
Preceded by Kristin Panzenhagen	Senior Military Assistant to the Under Secretary of the Air Force; 2023–2024	Succeeded by Lauren Courchaine
Preceded by Robert Hutt	Director of Plans and Programs of the United States Space Force; 2024–2025	Succeeded by Christopher Fernengel
Preceded by Anthony Mastalir	Commander of the United States Space Forces Indo-Pacific; 2025–present	Incumbent
