= United States Space Forces – Korea =

Space Force component field command to the U.S. Forces Korea

- USSPACEFOR-KOR emblem
- Founded: 14 December 2022; 46 months
- Country: United States
- Branch: United States Space Force
- Type: Component field command
- Role: Space operations
- Size: ~20 personnel
- Part of: United States Forces Korea; United States Space Forces – Indo-Pacific
- Headquarters: Osan Air Base, South Korea
- Website: Official website

Commanders
- Commander: Col Dorian C. Hatcher
- Deputy Commander: Maj Charles Taylor
- Senior Enlisted Leader: SMSgt Ryan J. Canterbury

Insignia
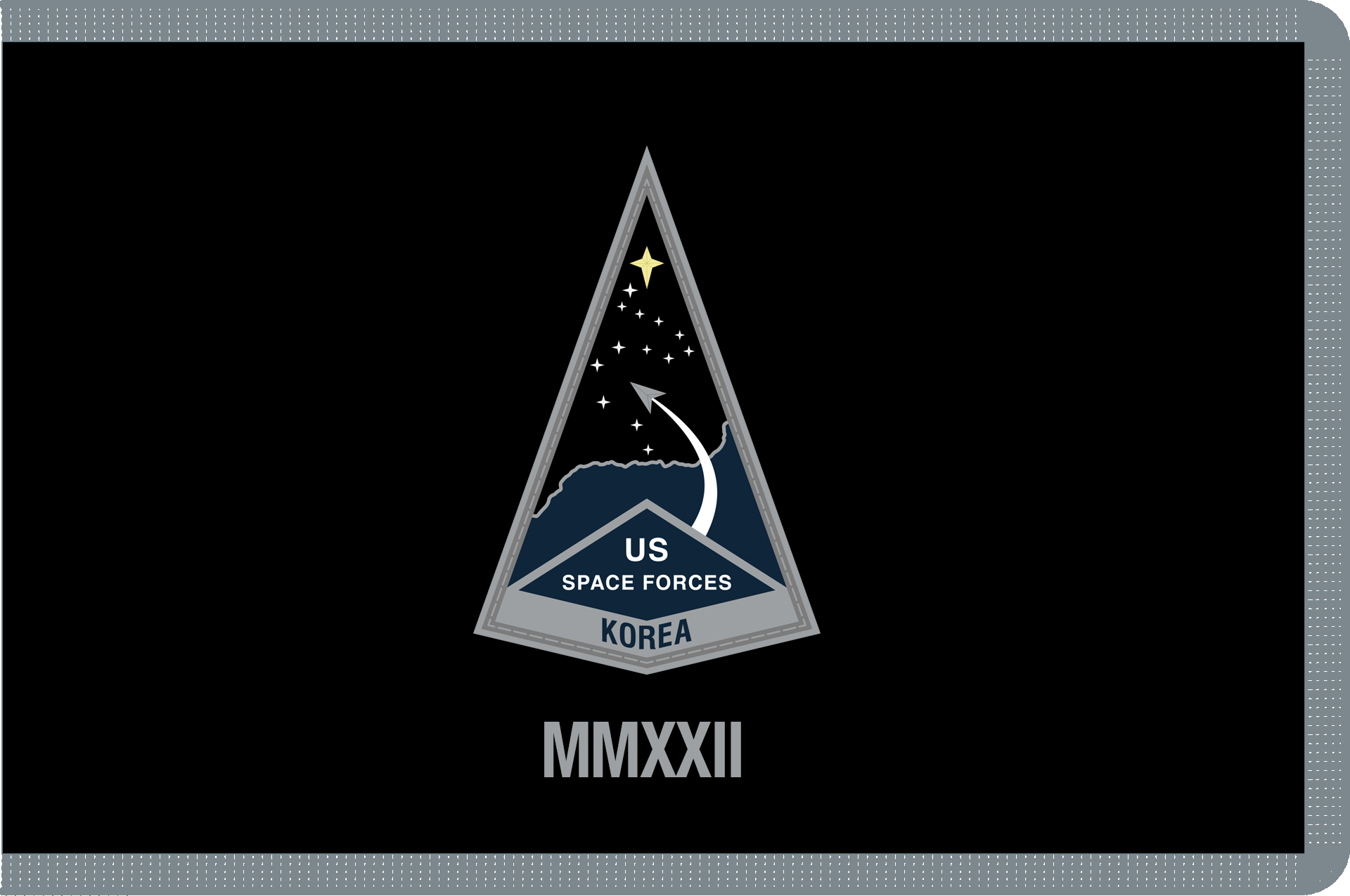
- Flag of the Space Forces Korea Command

The United States Space Forces – Korea (USSPACEFOR-KOR) is the United States Space Force component field command to the United States Forces Korea. Headquartered in Osan Air Base, South Korea, it plans, coordinates, supports, and conducts employment of space operations across the full range of military operations, including security cooperation, in support of the sub-unified command's objectives. It was activated on 14 December 2022.

== History ==
=== Director of Space Forces, Seventh Air Force ===
USSPACEFOR-KOR's presence in the United States Forces Korea traces back to the director of space forces (DIRSPACEFOR) construct before the establishment of the Space Force. When the Space Force was still Air Force Space Command, there would be a space operations officer called the DIRSPACEFOR in every air service component command that would advise the air component commander on matters relating to space operations. As such, there was a director of space forces assigned to Seventh Air Force.

==== List of directors of space forces ====
- Lt Col Joshua M. McCullion, May 2021 – 14 December 2022

=== Establishment ===
USSPACEFOR-KOR was activated on 14 December 2022.

== List of commanders ==
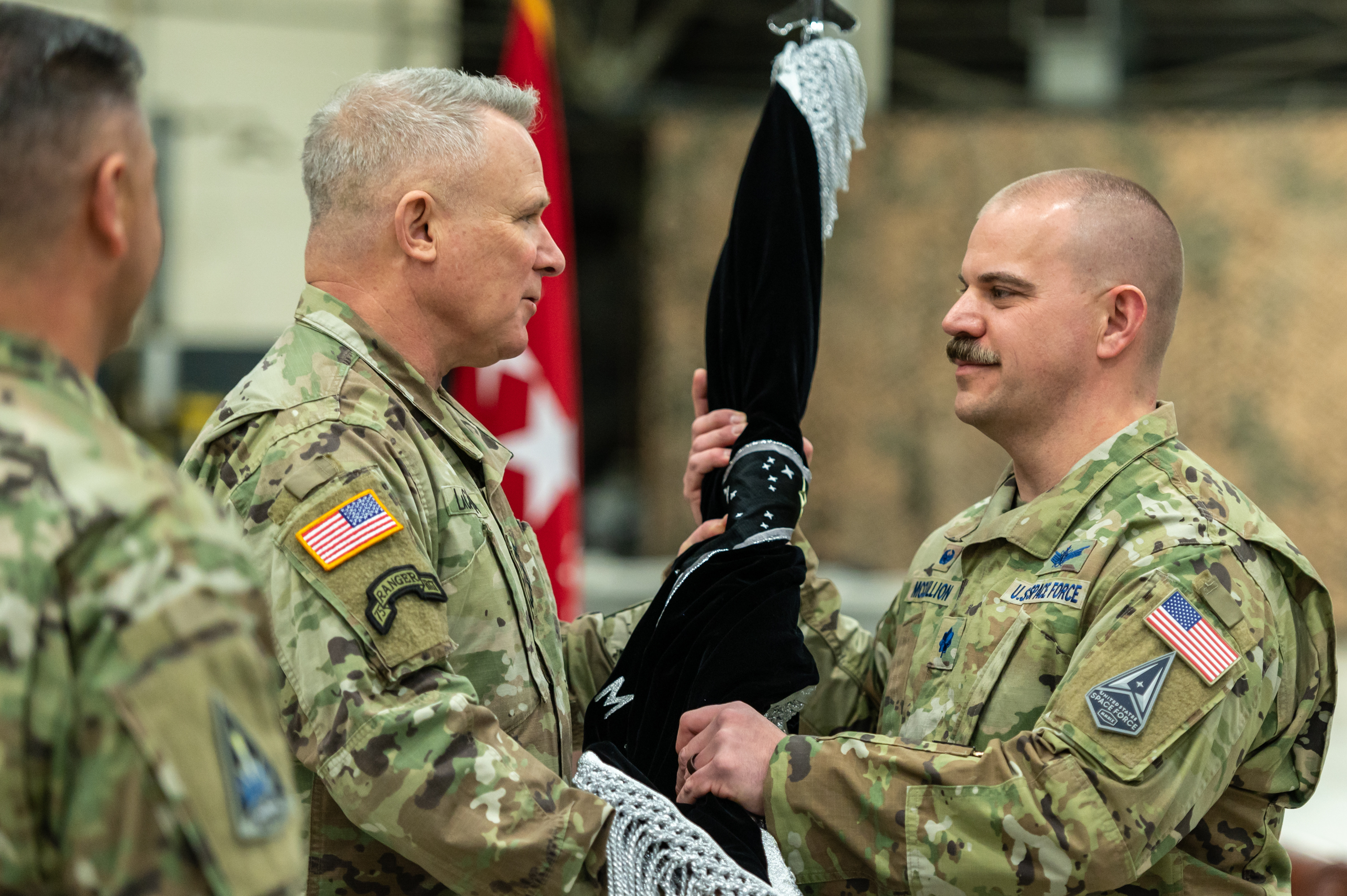
Gen LaCamera (center) passes the SPACEFORKOR flag to Lt Col McCullion as Brig Gen Mastalir looks on during the activation of the unit, 14 December 2022

No.	Commander		Term			Ref
No.	Portrait	Name	Took office	Left office	Term length	Ref
1	Joshua M. McCullion	Lieutenant Colonel; Joshua M. McCullion (born c. 1983)	14 December 2022	12 July 2024	1 year, 211 days	
2	John D. Patrick	Colonel; John D. Patrick (born c. 1973)	12 July 2024	2 June 2026	1 year, 325 days	
3	Dorian C. Hatcher	Colonel; Dorian C. Hatcher (born c. 1978)	2 June 2026	Incumbent	155 days	

== See also ==
- United States Forces Korea
- United States Space Force
- Seventh Air Force
