= Center for Excellence in Disaster Management and Humanitarian Assistance =

Coordinates: 21.3603°N 157.9597°W

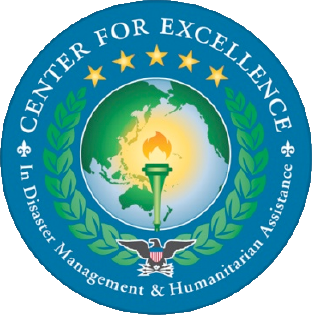
- Logo for the Center for Excellence
- Founded: 1994; 32 years ago
- Country: United States
- Part of: U.S. Pacific Command
- Location: Joint Base Pearl Harbor–Hickam, Hawaii, U.S.
- Nickname: "CFE-DM"

Commanders
- Director: Joseph D. Martin, SES

The Center for Excellence in Disaster Management and Humanitarian Assistance (CFE-DM) is a direct reporting unit to the U.S. Pacific Command (USPACOM) and principal agency to promote disaster preparedness and societal resiliency in the Asia-Pacific region. As part of its mandate, CFE-DM facilitates education and training in disaster preparedness, consequence management and health security to develop domestic, foreign and international capability and capacity.

CFE-DM partners with a wide variety of national and international governmental, nongovernmental and international organizations to provide relevant education, training, interagency coordination and research. CFE-DM's initiatives include establishing field offices at each US Regional Combatant Command and establishing strategic partnerships with public and private sector entities, such as Asia Pacific Center for Security Studies (APCSS), Pacific Disaster Center (PDC), Harvard Humanitarian Initiative, University of Hawaii, foundations, institutes, and universities.

== Directors ==
- Capt. (Ret.) Frederick M. "Skip" Burkle Jr., Navy (1994–2000)
- Capt. (Ret.) Gerard (Pete) Bradford, Navy (January 2001 – June 2008)
- Mr. Douglas Wallace, (Acting Director) (June 2008 – October 2008)
- Lt. Gen. (Ret.) John F. Goodman, Marine Corps (October 2008 – February 2012)
- Col. Philip A. Mead, Army, (Interim Director) (February 2012 – May 2013)
- Brig. Gen. (Ret.) Pamela K. Milligan, Air Force (May 2013 – May 2014)
- Col. Joseph D. Martin, Air Force (May 2014 – June 2016)
- Mr. Douglas Wallace, (Acting Director) (June – October 2016)
- Col. (Ret.) Joseph D. Martin, Air Force (October 2016 – present)
