= Frederick M. "Skip" Burkle Jr. =

American physician

Frederick M. "Skip" Burkle, Jr.
- Born: April 29, 1940 (age 85); New Haven, CT
- Education: Saint Michael's College; University of Vermont; Yale School of Medicine; Harvard Medical School; University of California at Berkeley; University of Geneva; Royal College of Surgeons in Ireland; Dartmouth-Hitchcock Medical Center
- Spouse: Phyllis Dinnean
- Scientific career
- Fields: Pediatrics; Psychiatry; Emergency Medicine

Frederick M. "Skip" Burkle, Jr. (born April 29, 1940) is an American physician known for his work in human rights, international diplomacy and peacemaking, humanitarian assistance, and disaster response. He has been called "the single most talented and experienced post-conflict health specialist working for the United States government." His medical qualifications include pediatrics, emergency medicine, psychiatry, public health, and tropical medicine.

Drafted into the U.S. Navy during the Vietnam War, he served as a military physician in Vietnam and was instrumental in Operation Babylift.

Burkle reached the rank of Captain (O-6) in the U.S. Naval Reserve before retiring.

== Personal life and education ==
Burkle was born in New Haven, CT, to Frederick and Mary Frances Burkle (née Borel). His father was an engineer with a telephone company, and his mother, one of the first women graduate students at Yale, was a teacher. He is the middle of three siblings: he has an older sister Joan, and a younger brother Richard, now deceased.

As a child, Burkle had dyslexia and unable to read until 5th grade. He developed his own language, which prompted his mother to seek a psychological evaluation for him. The evaluation, done at the time when little was known about learning disabilities and their co-existence with giftedness, revealed an extremely bright but "lazy" child.

Shy and self-conscious, Burkle intensely disliked school, even though he dreamed of becoming a doctor, inspired by seeing magazine pictures of physicians who saved starving children in Africa's jungle hospitals. He attended Notre Dame High School in West Haven, CT, and while there, he met his future wife, Phyllis Dinnean, who was attending St. Mary's High School. He credits meeting Phyllis with turning his life around, as she believed in him and encouraged him to go to college. With her support and against his father's wishes, Burkle decided to apply to Saint Michael's College in Colchester, Vermont:

"She urged me to plead my case to the High School Academic Dean, a stern gray haired Brother of Holy Cross, to both loan me the application fee and forward a decent recommendation. I was shaking in my boots. He silently pondered the circumstances yet nodded his head and agreed to accept the personal risk despite the potential anger of my Father . . ."

Burkle obtained his bachelor's degree from Saint Michael's College in 1961. He was conferred an honorary doctorate by Saint Michael's College in 2009. He completed his M.D. at the University of Vermont in 1965. He was in his residency in pediatrics (completed 1968) at the Yale School of Medicine when he was drafted into the U.S. Navy. He subsequently completed a fellowship in adolescent medicine in 1970 at Harvard Medical School and a residency in psychiatry in 1974 at the Dartmouth-Hitchcock Medical Center. He obtained an M.P.H. at the University of California at Berkeley in 1975, a Diploma in Emergencies in Large Populations at the University of Geneva in 1989, and a Diploma in Tropical Medicine from the Royal College of Surgeons in Ireland.

He has been qualified in Emergency Medicine, Pediatrics, Pediatric emergency medicine, and Psychiatry, and is a Fellow of the American College of Emergency Physicians and the American Academy of Pediatrics.

Together with his wife Phyllis, who worked as a teacher, the Burkles have raised three children, and currently reside in Hawaii.

== Military service and awards ==
In Rolling Thunder in a Gentle Land: The Vietnam War Revisited, author Andrew Wiest described how in 1968 Burkle was drafted into the U.S. Navy, deployed to South Vietnam, and assigned to the 3rd Medical Battalion. He served at Delta Med hospital at Dong Ha, a few miles south of the DMZ (Demilitarized Zone) treating countless casualties and acquiring skills as a combat surgeon. Attentive to the neutrality of medical personnel, Burkle also treated civilians and enemy combatants and helped manage the bubonic plague epidemic that devastated that area of the country. He served as the medical director of the last Viet Nam Operation Babylift out of the former Saigon in 1975.

A retired Captain (O-6) in the U.S. Naval Reserve, Burkle completed combat tours in the Vietnam War (1968), the Persian Gulf War (1991) and Somalia (1992) with the 1st, 2nd and 3rd Marine Divisions, and with the United States Central Command in Somalia, receiving two early promotions.

As a navy reservist, Burkle was recalled to active duty during the Persian Gulf War of 1990–1991, and deployed to Saudi Arabia. He was assigned to al Khanjar Navy-Marine Corps Trauma Center. Just miles from the Kuwait border, this hospital was the largest field medical treatment facility in Marine Corps history. Several days before the ground war began on February 24, 1991, commanding general of the 2nd Force Service Support Group, Brig. Gen. Charles Krulak, selected Capt. Burkle to serve as Senior Medical Officer and Chief of Professional Services of the 2nd Medical Battalion at al Khanjar Navy-Marine Corps Trauma Center. When the fighting ended on February 28, the Trauma Center had treated more than 600 Allied casualties and many more Iraqi wounded.

In early 2003, Burkle was appointed the interim minister of health of the Coalition Provisional Authority in Iraq. In April 2003, when faced with rapidly deteriorating social order and health of the Iraqi population after the collapse of Saddam's government, Burkle declared a public health emergency, a decision that cost him his job. He was replaced by James K. Haveman Jr. who, as The Washington Post reports, tried to make Iraq's health system with a U.S. like two-tier healthcare model of private healthcare providers, co-payments and primary care. History Commons reported that a USAID official said the White House wanted a "loyalist."

His awards include two Bronze Star Medals (Viet Nam and PGW) one rito with Combat "Valor" (1968 Viet Nam), Combat Action Ribbon, Vietnamese Cross of Gallantry, Defense Meritorious Service Medal, Navy Commendation Medal, Army Commendation Medal, Joint Meritorious Unit Citation (2 awards), Vietnamese Meritorious Medical Medal, the Humanitarian Service Medal (2 awards), and the Military Outstanding Volunteer Service Medal.

== Center for Excellence in Disaster Management and Humanitarian Assistance ==
In 1994, Burkle worked with then senator of Hawaii Daniel Inouye to develop a Center of Excellence in Disaster Management and Humanitarian Assistance (COEDMHA). At the time the CFE was located at Tripler Army Medical Center and Burkle was its first and founding director. The center has since been renamed to the Center for Excellence in Disaster Management and Humanitarian Assistance (CFE-DM) and was moved to Ford Island in Pearl Harbor. The purpose of the center was to serve as a resource for bringing science and innovation to enhance humanitarian assistance and disaster relief by improving humanitarian civil-military coordination.

Burkle's vision was to have the CFE serve as a civilian-led research and training institute that would enhance the capacity of the U.S. and foreign militaries to operate effectively in humanitarian assistance missions. The main tasks of the CFE were to increase militaries' understanding of the humanitarian ethos and the guiding principles of humanitarian organizations, along with promoting an understanding of the international humanitarian architecture and the key humanitarian organizations involved in humanitarian response. Dr. Burkle hired a highly experienced staff drawn from academia, the United Nations, the medical field, and the U.S. military to fulfill this vision.

He also established partnerships with a wide range of UN organizations, international non-governmental organizations, the International Committee of the Red Cross, and the University of Hawaii. Burkle and the staff he hired led numerous research projects and training courses including the Health Emergencies in Large Populations (H.E.L.P.) course, a training course for managing relief operations in humanitarian crises, as well as the Health Assistance Response Training Course (HART).

The center was named a WHO Collaborating Center for Civil-Military Engagement, and was the only center so designated. After Burkle left the CFE in 2000, the WHO removed its designation.

== Additional international work ==
In the late 1970s and early 80s, Burkle traveled to China to assist in treating and lecturing on malnutrition and poverty that plagued 83% of the population. Burkle partnered with his long-term friend and colleague Professor Zong-Hao, Li, former director at Beijing Emergency Medical Center, currently president of the China Emergency Resuscitation Association, to teach and advance emergency medicine as a specialty in China. During the 1990s he assisted in the development of the emergency medical services in hospitals in and around Beijing and on the Hainan Island.

In 1992, Burkle worked with International Services of the American Red Cross in the Kurdish Crisis in Iraq.

He was deputy assistant administrator, Bureau of Global Health at the Bureau of Global Health at United States Agency for International Development (USAID), United States Department of State (2001–2003).

Burkle is a faculty member at European Master in Disaster Medicine, an International Master of Science organization by the University of Eastern Piedmont, Novara, Italy and the Free University of Brussels. Here Burkle helps as advisor in their research center CRIMEDIM as well as guides their research in humanitarian aid.

In 2002, Burkle received a White House Appointment to serve as Deputy Assistant Administrator for the Bureau of Global Health at United States Agency for International Development (USAID), United States Department of State. In this capacity, he was appointed the first Interim Minister of Health in Iraq in 2003 during the planning and immediate crisis period.

In January 2017, WADEM (World Association for Disaster and Emergency Medicine) named its biennial Award for Global Leadership in Emergency Public Health in honor of Dr. Burkle, recognizing his outstanding contributions to the science and practice of humanitarian relief efforts. The Burkle Award's first two recipients were Drs. Ian Norton of the WHO Emergency Medical Teams Initiative, and Joanne Liu of Médecins Sans Frontières.

== Academic career ==
- 1989–2000 Burkle was professor of pediatrics, surgery and public health and chairman of the Division of Emergency Medicine, Department of Surgery, University of Hawaii Schools of Medicine and Public Health. He has also been an adjunct professor with the University of Hawaii, John A. Burns School of Medicine, Department of Public Health Sciences and the School of Nursing. And he has served as clinical professor of surgery and adjunct professor in tropical medicine at the University of Hawaii.
- July 1993 – present he served as an adjunct professor, and from 2006 to 2010 a professor, at the Department of Community Emergency Health & Paramedic Practice, Monash University Faculty of Medicine, Nursing and Health Sciences, and from 2012 at the Monash University Disaster Resilience Initiative, Melbourne, Australia.
- July 1993 – present he served as adjunct professor, Uniformed Services University of Health Sciences, Bethesda, Maryland.
- 1994 – 2000 he was the founder and director of the Center for Excellence in Disaster Management and Humanitarian Assistance, a partnership of University of Hawaii, Pacific Regional Medical Command, Tripler Army Medical Center, Centers for Disease Control & Prevention, and a World Health Organization (WHO) Collaborating Center for humanitarian civil-military cooperation, the only one so designated.
- May 2004 – present he served as Senior Fellow the Harvard Humanitarian Initiative, and visiting scientist, Harvard School of Public Health, Harvard University.
- June 2004 – present he served as former senior scholar and now senior associate faculty and research scientist, the Center for Refugee & Disaster Response, Johns Hopkins University Medical Institutes.
- 2004–present he served as senior policy advisor, Center for Disaster Medical Sciences, University of California at Irvine.
- 2008–present he served as senior international public policy scholar, Woodrow Wilson Center for International Scholars, Washington, D.C.
- 2012–present he served as adjunct professor, James Cook University, Anton Breinl Centre for Public Health & Tropical Medicine, Australia
- Burkle is honorary professor, the Humanitarian & Conflict Response Institute, University of Manchester, UK.
- He served as the senior advisor in medicine and public health for the Defense Threat Reduction Agency and as a research scientist for the Centers for Disease Control and Prevention.
- He has also been associated with the following institutions: Africa Center for Strategic Studies, Washington, D.C., and Tulane University School of Public Health and Tropical Medicine, Louisiana, U.S.A.
- Burkle has been a speaker at WHO, The Woodrow Wilson International Center for Scholars, the Council on Foreign Relations, and Global Forum in Davos, Switzerland, National Institutes of Health, the Hyogo Declaration Regional Symposium and the World Bank.

== Narcissism in U.S. Polity ==
In December 2015, Burkle published a seminal paper on "Antisocial Personality Disorder and Pathological Narcissism in Prolonged Conflicts and Wars of the 21st Century" warning against political leaders with narcissistic and antisocial character disorders as a major source of humanity's problems. This was the most read article on ResearchGate in 2016. He followed it up with a Harvard International Review paper, co-authored with Dan Hanfling, MD, and published in March, 2016, on "When being smart is not enough: Narcissism in U.S. Polity" where he discusses the widespread collective narcissism in America as a main enabling factor and portent of a toxic presidency.

== Awards and honors ==
- 1996: Col. Donald Cook (Medal of Honor) Award for Humanitarian Service presented by the board of directors/alumni association, Saint Michael's College, "the highest honor for alumni it recognizes those who unselfishly give of themselves in the service of others".
- 1999: The William Crawford Gorgas Medal: National Award presented by the American College of Military Surgeons of the United States for "distinguished work in preventive medicine, groundbreaking work in disaster management and humanitarian assistance and the training of an entire generation of U.S. and international personnel".
- 1999: State of Hawaii Emergency Physician of the Year Award, presented by the governor of Hawaii
- 2000: Sidbury Visiting Professor: Duke University School of Medicine, International Health, Department of Pediatrics and Internal Medicine, May 2000
- 2000: Ellwood Lecture: American Academy of Pediatrics, 34th Annual Pediatric Seminar, March, 2000
- 2000: Knight of Honor Award: Presented to Distinguished Alumni of Notre Dame High School, West Haven, Connecticut
- 2004: International Federation for Emergency Medicine: Humanitarian Award, 10th International Conference in Cairns, Australia, June 2004
- 2005: University of Vermont, College of Medicine Alumni Association Award for Community Service in Medicine for his "distinguished career in humanitarian and military service," 2005
- 2007: Elected to the Institute of Medicine of the National Academy of Sciences, 2007
- 2008: Woodrow Wilson International Public Policy Scholar, 2008 to present
- 2009: Honorary Doctorate in Humane Letters, Honoris Causis, from Saint Michaels College, 2009
- 2012: Joseph Leiter Lectureship at the National Institutes of Health in Washington, DC. This award, presented every two years recognizes "research and instruction to outstanding service and leadership and professional recognition that supports and encourages the best and brightest in the field," 2012
- 2014: Disaster Medical Sciences Award from the American College of Emergency Physicians, 2014
- 2015: Board of Scientific Counselors, Secretary of Health and Human Services, Office of Public Health Preparedness and Response of the Centers for Disease Control and Prevention (CDC)
- 2015: Burkle's research on casualty estimates in nuclear war, shared with colleagues from the University of Georgia, was selected by the Nobel Laureates to be presented at their World Summit of Nobel Peace Laureates in Spain.
- 2016: Commencement Address at the Saint Michael's College graduation, 2016.
- 2017 McGill University Humanitarian leadership award

== Publications ==
Professor Burkle is noted among "the most recognized leaders in the fields of Disaster Medicine, Public Health Preparedness, Emergency Management, and Environmental Health." He has published over 240 scientific practice and policy articles, multiple abstracts, 70 book chapters and four books, three on disaster management including Disaster Medicine: Applications for the Immediate Management and Triage of Civilian and Military Disaster Victims in 1984.

- Burkle, Frederick M., Jr. Water on the Moon: A Physician’s Memoir of Service from the Vietnam War to Humanitarian Crises Worldwide. Ed. Jan K. Herman and Megan Snair. McFarland, 2024.
- Lifeline – Frederick "Skip" M Burkle, Jr., Lancet. Volume 364, No. 9433, p495, 7 August 2004. DOI: https://dx.doi.org/10.1016/S0140-6736(04)16793-7
- Globalization and Disasters: Issues of Public Health, State Capacity and Political Action, Journal of International Affairs. Vol. 59, No. 2, Spring/Summer 2006.
- Population-based Triage Management in Response to Surge-capacity Requirements during a Large-scale Bioevent Disaster, Academic Emergency Medicine. December 2006; 13(11). DOI:10.1197/j.aem.2006.06.040
- Conversations in Disaster Medicine and Public Health: The Profession], Disaster Medicine and Public Health Preparedness. Volume 8, Issue 1. February 2014, pp. 5–11. DOI: https://doi.org/10.1017/dmp.2014.11
- Yasuhiro Otomo and Frederick M. Burkle. Breakout Session 1 Summary: Frameworks and Policies Relating to Medical Preparedness and Health Management in Disasters, Disaster Medicine and Public Health Preparedness. Volume 8, Issue 4. August 2014, pp. 359–360. DOI: https://doi.org/10.1017/dmp.2014.72
- The World Health Organization Global Health Emergency Workforce: What Role Will the United States Play?, Disaster Medicine and Public Health Preparedness. Volume 10, Issue 4, August 2016, pp. 531–535. DOI: https://doi.org/10.1017/dmp.2016.114
- Koenig and Schultz's Disaster Medicine: Comprehensive Principles and Practices: Complex Public Health Emergencies, Cambridge University Press, 18 April 2016, pp. 433–449.

== Bibliography ==
- Frederick "Skip" Burkle, Wilson Center Bio. Retrieved 2017-01-10
- Frederick "Skip" Burkle, Coursera Bio. Retrieved 2017-01-10
- Frederick "Skip" M. Burkle, Jr., Humanitarian Healthcare Provider Program, Advancing Practice. Retrieved 2017-01-10
- Frederick "Skip" M. Burkle, Jr., Enhancing Learning & Research for Humanitarian Assistance. Retrieved 2017-01-10
- Frederick Burkle, Jr., adjunct professor, Monash University. Retrieved 2017-01-10
