= United States Space Forces – Japan =

Space Force component field command to the U.S. Forces Korea

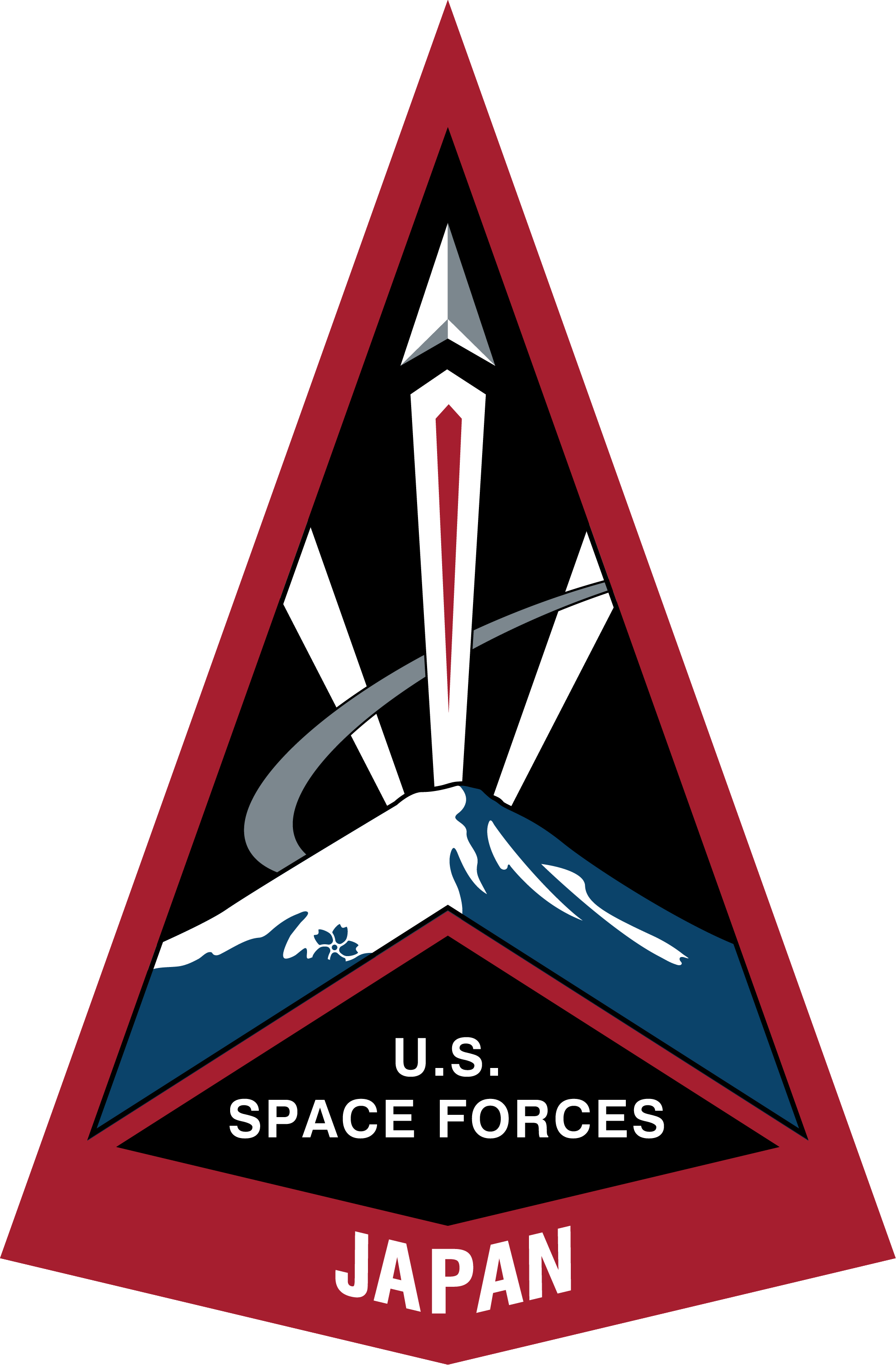
- USSPACEFOR-JPN emblem
- Active: 4 December 2024; 22 months
- Country: United States
- Branch: United States Space Force
- Type: Component field command
- Role: Space operations
- Size: 10 personnel
- Part of: United States Forces Japan; United States Space Forces – Indo-Pacific
- Headquarters: Yokota Air Base, Japan

Commanders
- Commander: Col John D. Patrick
- Deputy Commander: Lt Col Kaoru Elliot
- Command Senior Enlisted Leader: CMSgt Aldrin J. Smith

Insignia
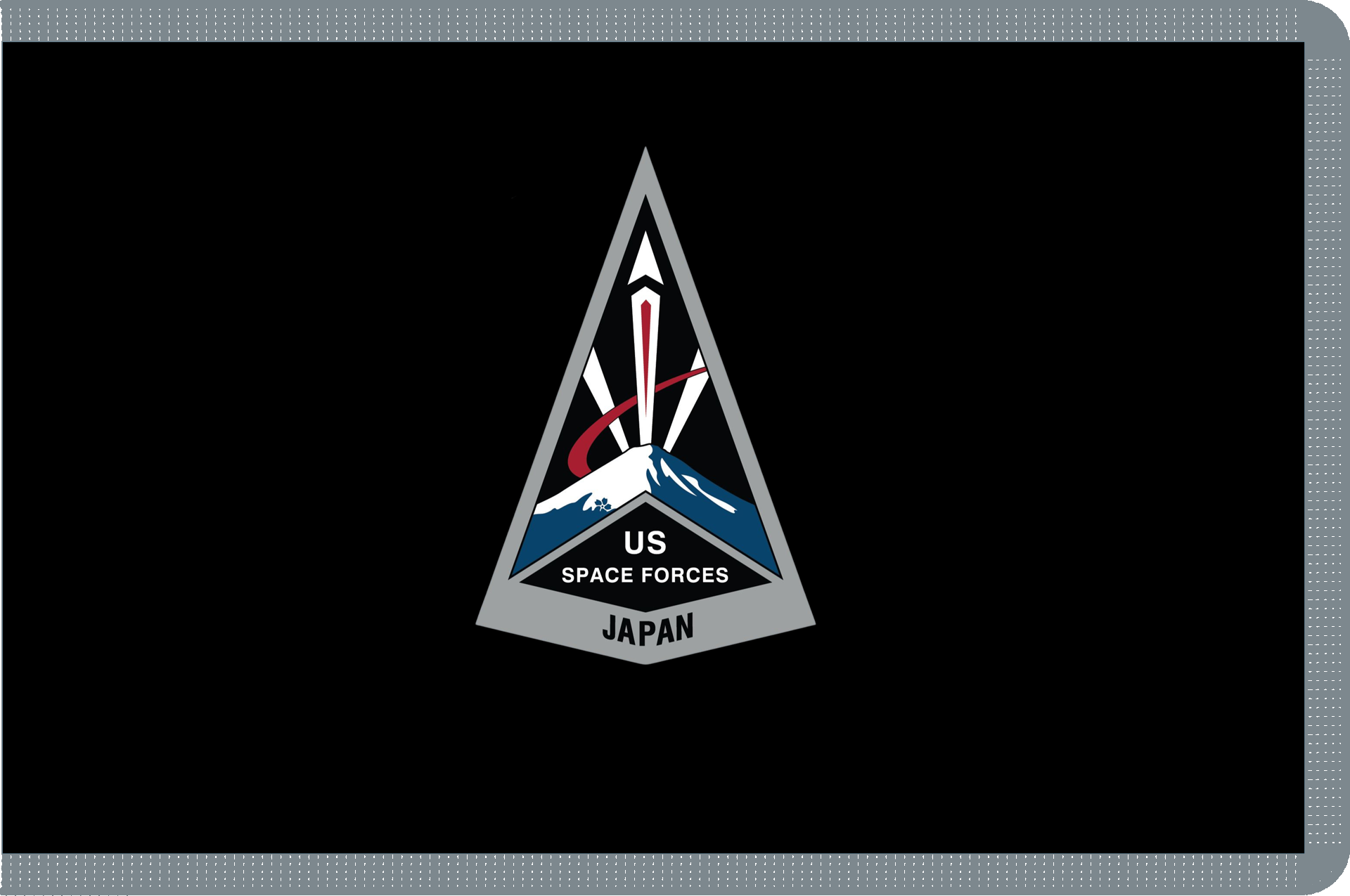
- Flag of the Space Force Japan Command

The United States Space Forces – Japan (USSPACEFOR-JPN) is the United States Space Force component field command to the United States Forces Japan.

== List of commanders ==
No.	Commander		Term			Ref
No.	Portrait	Name	Took office	Left office	Term length	Ref
1	Ryan C. Laughton	Colonel; Ryan C. Laughton (born c. 1981)	4 December 2024	3 June 2026	1 year, 181 days	
2	John D. Patrick	Colonel; John D. Patrick (born c. 1973)	3 June 2026	Incumbent	146 days	

== See also ==
- United States Forces Japan
- United States Space Force
- Fifth Air Force
