= Kürşad Türkşen =

Kürşad Türkşen is a senior scientist in chronic disease at Ottawa Health Research Institute and an assistant professor, biochemistry, University of Ottawa. Türkşen is also the editor-in-chief for the journal Stem Cell Reviews and Reports, published by Humana Press, and is an executive board member for Springer Protocols, an online database of research protocols published by Springer Science+Business Media. Türkşen studies skin cells at the molecular level hoping to develop new treatments for skin conditions, wounds, burns, and genetic skin diseases.

== Research areas ==
He and his team co-discovered a molecule called claudin-6 which plays an important role in the development and function of skin cells Türkşen's recent research centers on the study of stem cells, including how growth factors regulate the commitment of epidermal progenitors in the differentiating embryonic stem (R1) cells, and identifying and characterizing genes that determine the pathway leading from very early progenitors (K8-positive) to late epidermal progenitors (K5/K14-positive), using the gene trap and differential display techniques.

== Published research ==
Türkşen's research has been published in numerous research journals, including the Journal of Investigative Dermatology, Molecular Biotechnology, and Gene Expression Patterns. Dr. Türkşen is also the editor of numerous stem cell books, including three recent volumes in the book series Methods in Molecular Biology: Embryonic Stem Cell Protocols Volume I: Isolation And Characterization, Embryonic Stem Cell Protocols Volume II: Differentiation Models, and Human Embryonic Stem Cell Protocols.
