= Annals of Operations Research =

- Discipline: Operations research
- Language: English
- Edited by: Endre Boros

Publication details
- History: 1984-present
- Publisher: Springer Science+Business Media
- Impact factor: 4.1 (2025)

Standard abbreviations
- ISO 4: Ann. Oper. Res.

Indexing
- ISSN: 0254-5330 (print); 1572-9338 (web)
- OCLC no.: 859675249

Links
- Journal homepage; Online archive

Annals of Operations Research is a peer-reviewed academic journal published by Springer Science+Business Media. It was previously published by Baltzer Science Publishers. The journal publishes 24 issues a year that focus on the theoretical, practical, and computational aspects of operations research. It also publishes periodic special volumes focusing on defined fields of operations research.

== Editors-in-chief ==
The following is a list of persons that have been editor-in-chief of The Annals of Operations Research.

- Peter L. Hammer
- Endre Boros

== Abstracting and indexing ==
Annals of Operations Research is abstracted and indexed in DBLP, Journal Citation Reports, Mathematical Reviews, Research Papers in Economics, SCImago Journal Rank, Scopus, Science Citation Index, Zentralblatt MATH, among others. According to the Journal Citation Reports, the journal has a 2025 impact factor of 4.1.
