= Trevor Hale =

American academic (born 1965)

Trevor S. Hale
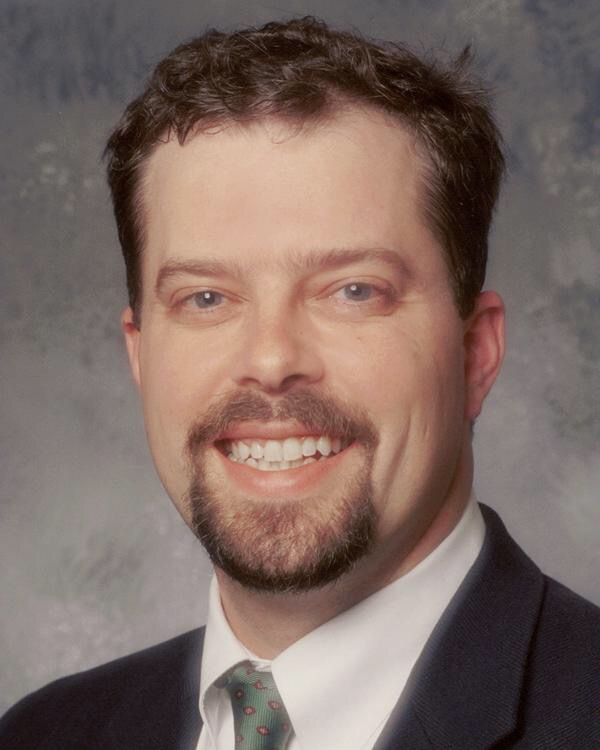
- Born: November 10, 1965 (age 60); Bellefonte, Pennsylvania, U.S.
- Education: Penn State University; Northeastern University; Texas A&M University
- Occupations: Professor; Businessman; Engineer
- Title: Clinical Professor at Texas A&M University

Trevor S. Hale (born c. 1965) is a professor of business analytics at Huston-Tillotson University. Prior to this he was a professor of business analytics at Texas A&M University (Mays Business School). He received his Ph.D. in Operations research from Texas A&M University, an MS in Engineering management from Northeastern University, and an BS in Industrial engineering from the Pennsylvania State University. Before joining the University of Houston-Downtown business faculty in 2006, Hale was an engineering faculty member at both Ohio University and Colorado State University-Pueblo as well as an engineer at Lockheed Martin. Additionally, Hale spends most of his summers as an Office of Naval Research Senior Faculty Fellow at Naval Base Ventura County.

== Early life ==
Hale was born and raised in State College, Pennsylvania, the first son of the late Dr. Leslie C. Hale, an A. Robert Noll Professor of Electrical Engineering Emeritus at Penn State. Hale grew up racing BMX bikes in the American Bicycle Association at the Stormstown BMX track in central Pennsylvania.

== Academic career ==
Hale's research has appeared in many high quality academic journals, including European Journal of Operational Research and Annals of Operations Research. His research interests include location science, warehouse science, and energy management. Hale teaches a number of graduate and undergraduate classes, including operations management, quality management, research methods, and related subjects.

In 2012 Hale was elected the president-elect of the University of Houston-Downtown Faculty Senate, serving as president during the 2013–2014 academic year. He was reelected in 2016 receiving the distinction of being the only faculty member ever elected faculty senate president twice at UHD.

In 2015, Hale became the managing co-author of a best selling university textbook in quantitative analysis/business analytics by Pearson.
