= Frank Plastria =

Frank A. A. Plastria (born 30 October 1948 in Berchem-Sainte-Agathe) is a Belgian operations researcher, a professor in the department of mathematics, operational research, statistics and information systems for management at Vrije Universiteit Brussel, known for his work on facility location. His work has been published in journals such as the European Journal of Operational Research, Discrete Applied Mathematics and Mathematical Programming.

Plastria earned his Ph.D. in 1983 from the Vrije Universiteit Brussel. From its founding in 2002 until 2009 he was editor-in-chief of 4OR: A Quarterly Journal of Operations Research, and he is the editor-in-chief of Studies in Locational Analysis. In 2002–2003 he was president of SOGESCI-B.V.W.B. (ORBEL), the Belgian Operations Research society.
