= Methods in Molecular Biology =

- Language: English
- Edited by: John M. Walker

Publication details
- History: 1983–present
- Publisher: Humana Press

Standard abbreviations
- ISO 4: Methods Mol. Biol.

Indexing
- ISSN: 1064-3745 (print); 1940-6029 (web)
- OCLC no.: 24839341

Links
- Series homepage

Methods in Molecular Biology is a book series published by Humana Press (an imprint of Springer Science+Business Media) that covers molecular biology research methods and protocols. The book series was introduced by series editor John M. Walker in 1983 and provides step-by-step instructions for carrying out experiments in a research lab. As of January 2020, more than 2000 volumes (2737 as of 15-August-2023) had been published in the series. The protocols are also available online in SpringerLink, and were previously in Springer Protocols.

Each protocol opens with an introductory overview and a list of the materials and reagents needed to complete the experiment. Every protocol is followed by a detailed procedure that is supported with a notes section offering tips and "tricks of the trade" as well as troubleshooting advice.

== See also ==
- Biological Procedures Online
