= Delta-8 =

Delta-8 may refer to:

- Delta-8-Tetrahydrocannabinol, a cannabinoid.
- Space Delta 8, a United States Space Force unit.
