= Jacob Middleton Jr. =

U.S. Space Force general officer

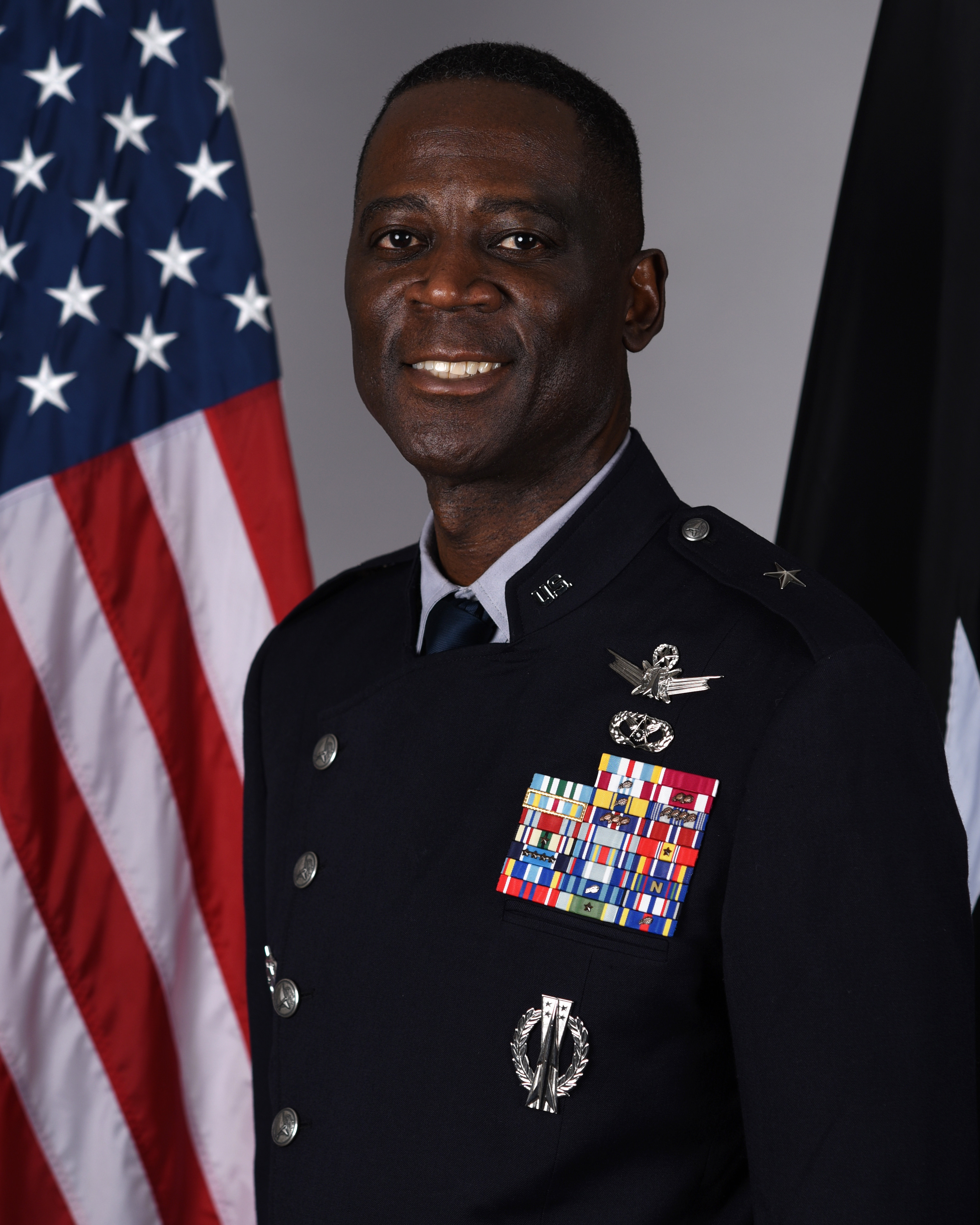
- Official portrait, 2025
- Born: c. 1970 (age 55–56)
- Education: Augusta State University (BA): Troy University (MA); George Washington University (MA)
- Military career
- Allegiance: United States
- Branch: United States Air Force: United States Space Force
- Service years: 1992–2021 (Air Force): 2021–2026 (Space Force)
- Rank: Brigadier General
- Nickname: dB
- Commands: United States Space Forces – Europe and Africa: Aerospace Data Facility-Colorado; Space Operations Squadron, ADF-C
- Awards: Defense Superior Service Medal: Legion of Merit

Jacob Middleton Jr. (born c. 1970) is a retired United States Space Force brigadier general who serves as the commander of United States Space Forces – Europe and Africa. He previously served as deputy director for operations of the Joint Staff. He has also commanded the Aerospace Data Facility-Colorado from 2018 to 2021.

== Education ==
Middleton received a B.A. in psychology degree in 1991 from Augusta State University. In 1997, he received an M.A. degree in public administration from Troy University. He also received an M.A. degree in organizational management in 2007 from the George Washington University. His professional military education included Squadron Officer School where he was the top third graduate, Air Command and Staff College, School of Advanced Air and Space Studies, Air War College, and National War College.

== Military career ==
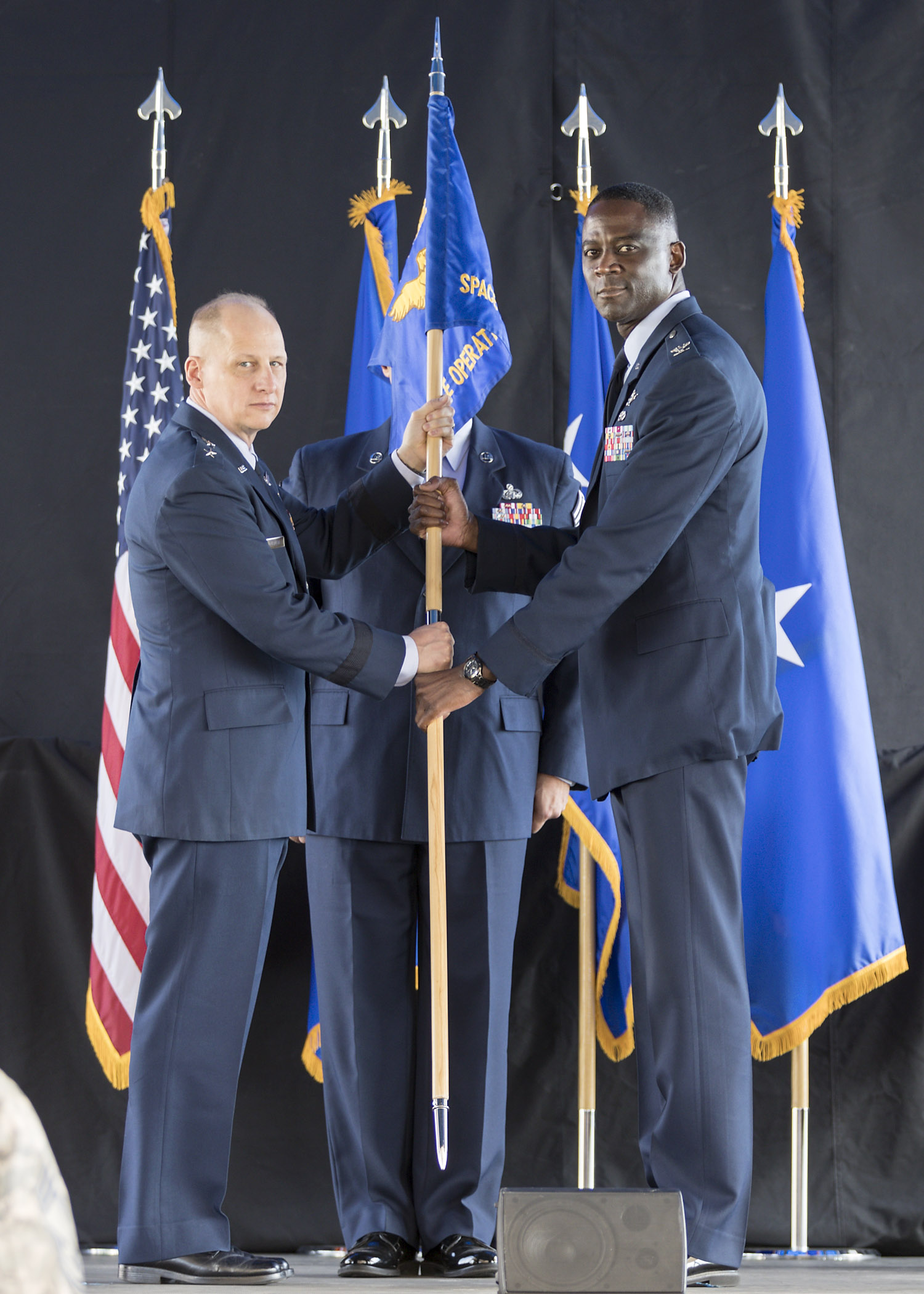
Middleton assumes command of the Aerospace Data Facility-Colorado in 2018

Middleton enlisted into the United States Air Force in August 1992. He was assigned as a plumber at Shaw Air Force Base, South Carolina, where he was awarded as one of the 12 Outstanding Airmen of the Year for the Mission Support Group.

On November 13, 1998, Middleton was commissioned as a second lieutenant through the Officer Training School. After commissioning, he underwent nine months of undergraduate space and missile training at Vandenberg Air Force Base, California. From 1999 to 2002, he was assigned at Minot Air Force Base, North Dakota, where he moved back and forth from operational and instructor positions. He first served a year as deputy missile combat crew commander for the 742nd Missile Squadron, after which he served as the instructor deputy missile combat crew commander for the 91st Operations Support Squadron. A year later, he returned to the 742nd Missile Squadron missile combat crew commander. He then served a year as an ICBM senior instructor combat crew commander for the 91st Operations Support Squadron. Finally, he served as the executive officer for the 91st Space Wing for four months.

In 2003, Middleton transferred to Alabama to serve as assistant professor of aerospace studies at AFROTC Detachment 015 at Tuskegee University. In 2005, he was selected to serve as an Air Force intern at Washington, D.C., assigned at the Office of the Assistant Secretary of Defense for Legislative Affairs and the National Space Security Office. From 2007 to 2010, he was assigned at various roles at the National Reconnaissance Office. He first served a year as chief of current operations at the National Reconnaissance Operations Center (NROC), then as executive officer for the deputy director for mission support, and finally as chief flight safety and vulnerability at NROC.

Middleton studied at the School of Advanced Air and Space Studies at Maxwell Air Force Base in Alabama for a year from 2010 to 2011. After that, he was assigned to Schriever Air Force Base, Colorado as operations officer for the 50th Operations Support Squadron. From June 2012 to May 2014, he then served as the commander of the Space Operations Squadron at the Aerospace Data Facility-Colorado (ADF-C) Space Operations Wing, located at Buckley Air Force Base. After his first command tour, he went back to Washington, D.C., serving as chief speechwriter for Vice Chief of Staff of the United States Air Force General Larry O. Spencer for a year. He then served at the Office of the Secretary of the Air Force as deputy chief of the Senate liaison division. For a year after that, he studied at the National War College (NWC).

From 2017 to 2019, Middleton was assigned as vice commander of the 50th Space Wing, during which time he deployed to Al Udeid Air Base, Qatar, as director of space forces at the United States Air Forces Central Combined Air and Space Operations Center. In 2019, he took command of ADF-C and Space Delta 20. After serving as commander for two years, he was assigned to the Pentagon as a senior congressional advisor at the Office of the Chief of Space Operations. At the same time, in 2021, he transferred to the United States Space Force.

In April 2022, Middleton started serving as director of national security space policy at the National Space Council. In May 2022, he was nominated and confirmed for promotion to brigadier general. On April 4, 2023, Vice President Kamala Harris promoted him to brigadier general. In July 2023, Middleton was reassigned as deputy director of operations of the Joint Staff.

On August 13, 2024, Middleton took command of United States Space Forces – Europe and Africa.

== Awards and decorations ==
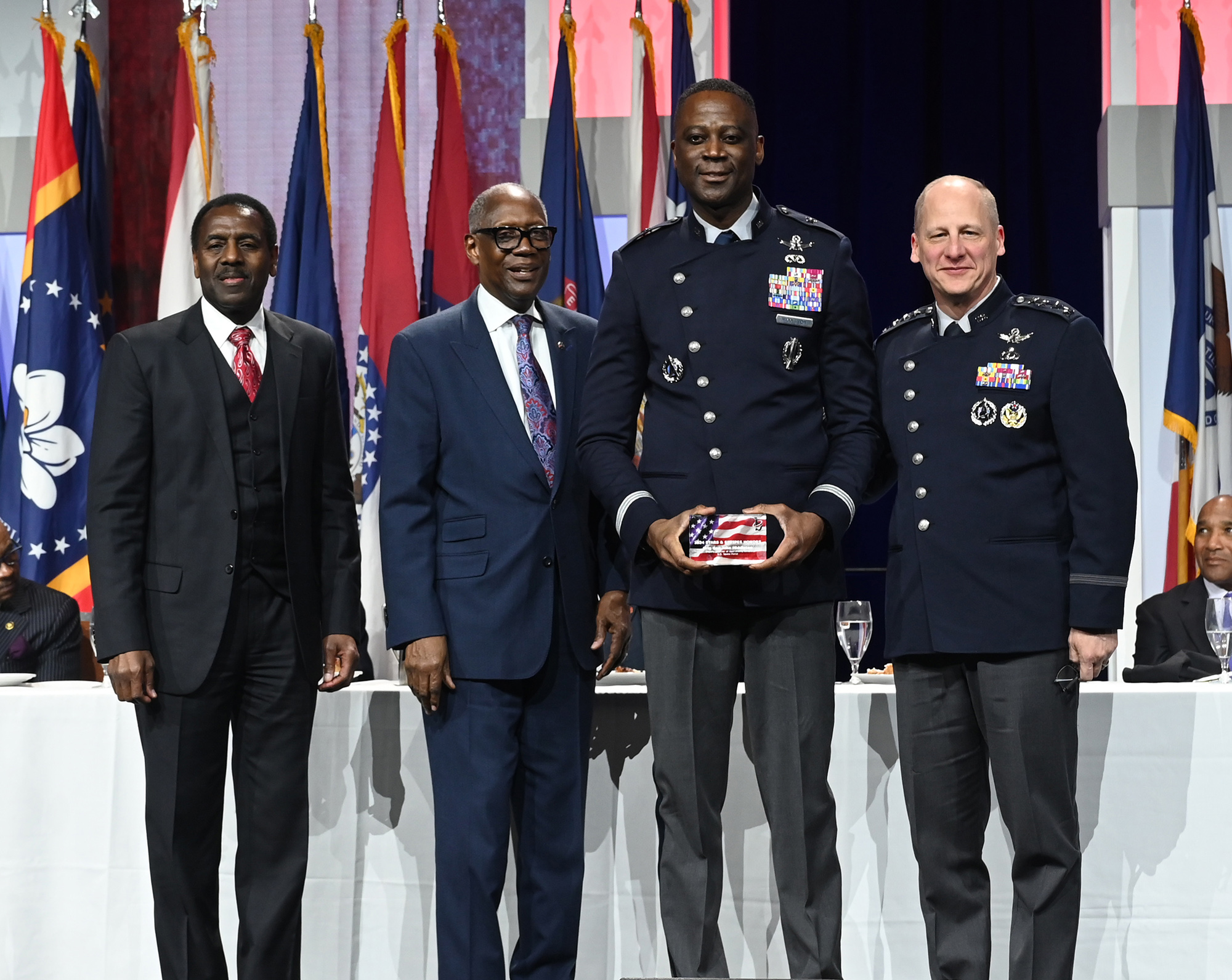
Middleton was awarded the 2024 Black Engineer of the Year for the Space Force

Middleton is the recipient of the following awards:

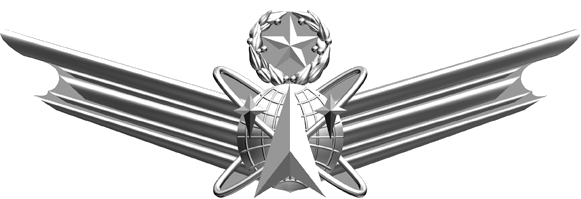
Command Space Operations Badge

Civil Engineer Badge

Basic Missile Operations Badge

Air Staff Badge

Defense Superior Service Medal
Legion of Merit
Defense Meritorious Service Medal with one bronze oak leaf cluster
Meritorious Service Medal with two bronze oak leaf clusters
Joint Service Commendation Medal
Air Force Commendation Medal with one bronze oak leaf cluster
Air Force Achievement Medal with four bronze oak leaf clusters
Joint Meritorious Unit Award
Air Force Outstanding Unit Award with three bronze oak leaf clusters
Air Force Organizational Excellence Award
Combat Readiness Medal
Air Force Good Conduct Medal
National Defense Service Medal with one bronze service star
Southwest Asia Service Medal with one bronze service star
Global War on Terrorism Expeditionary Medal
Global War on Terrorism Service Medal
Remote Combat Effects Campaign Medal with four bronze service stars
Air and Space Campaign Medal
Nuclear Deterrence Operations Service Medal with "N" device
Air and Space Expeditionary Service Ribbon
Air Force Longevity Service Award with one silver oak leaf cluster
Developmental Special Duty Ribbon
Air Force NCO PME Graduate Ribbon
Air Force Small Arms Expert Marksmanship Ribbon with one bronze service star
Air Force Training Ribbon with one bronze oak leaf cluster

- 2003 General Thomas S. Power Award – Best Missile Combat Crew in USAF
- 2021 National Reconnaissance Office Gold medal
- 2024 Black Engineer of the Year Awards, Science, Technology, Engineering and Mathematics

== Writings ==
- Calling the Cavalry: Disaster Relief and the American Military (2011)

== Dates of promotion ==
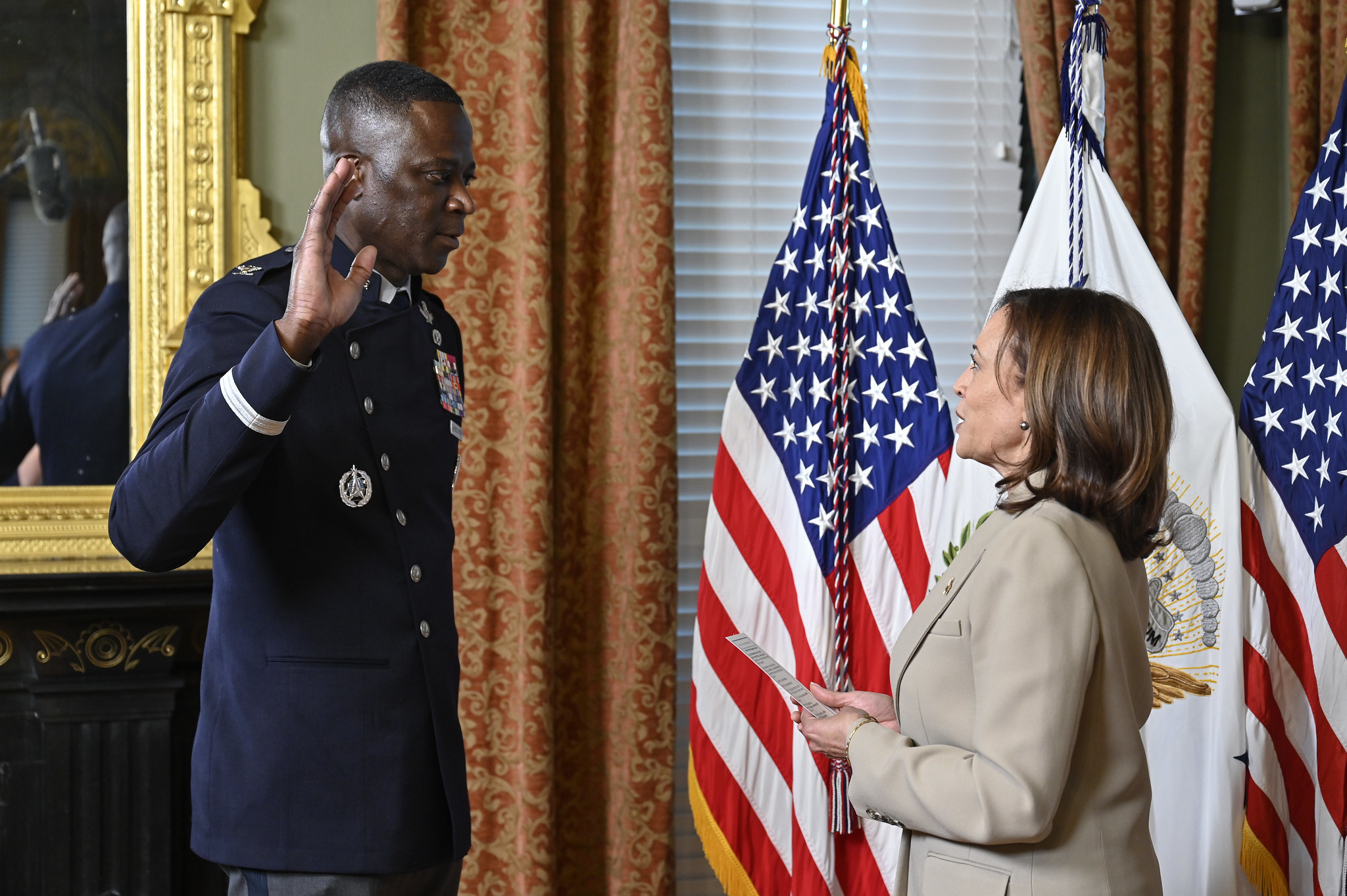
Middleton recites his oath of office to Vice President Kamala Harris during his promotion to brigadier general, April 4, 2023

Rank	Branch	Date
Second Lieutenant	Air Force	November 13, 1998
First Lieutenant	Air Force	November 13, 2000
Captain	Air Force	November 13, 2002
Major	Air Force	July 1, 2008
Lieutenant Colonel	Air Force	December 1, 2011
Colonel	Air Force	May 1, 2017
Colonel	Space Force	~September 30, 2020
Brigadier General	Space Force	December 23, 2022

Military offices
Preceded by Anthony Mastalir	Vice Commander of the 50th Space Wing; 2017–2019	Succeeded by Jack D. Fischer
Preceded by Christopher Povak	Commander of the Aerospace Data Facility-Colorado; 2019–2021	Succeeded by Robert J. Schreiner
New office	Director of National Security Space Policy at the National Space Council; 2022–2023	Succeeded by Matthew E. Holston
New office	Deputy Director for Operations of the Joint Staff; 2023–2024	Succeeded by Robert J. Schreiner
Preceded by Max E. Lantz II	Commander of the United States Space Forces – Europe and Africa; 2024–2026	Succeeded by Christopher Fernengel
