= 53rd Space Operations Squadron =

U.S. Space Force unit

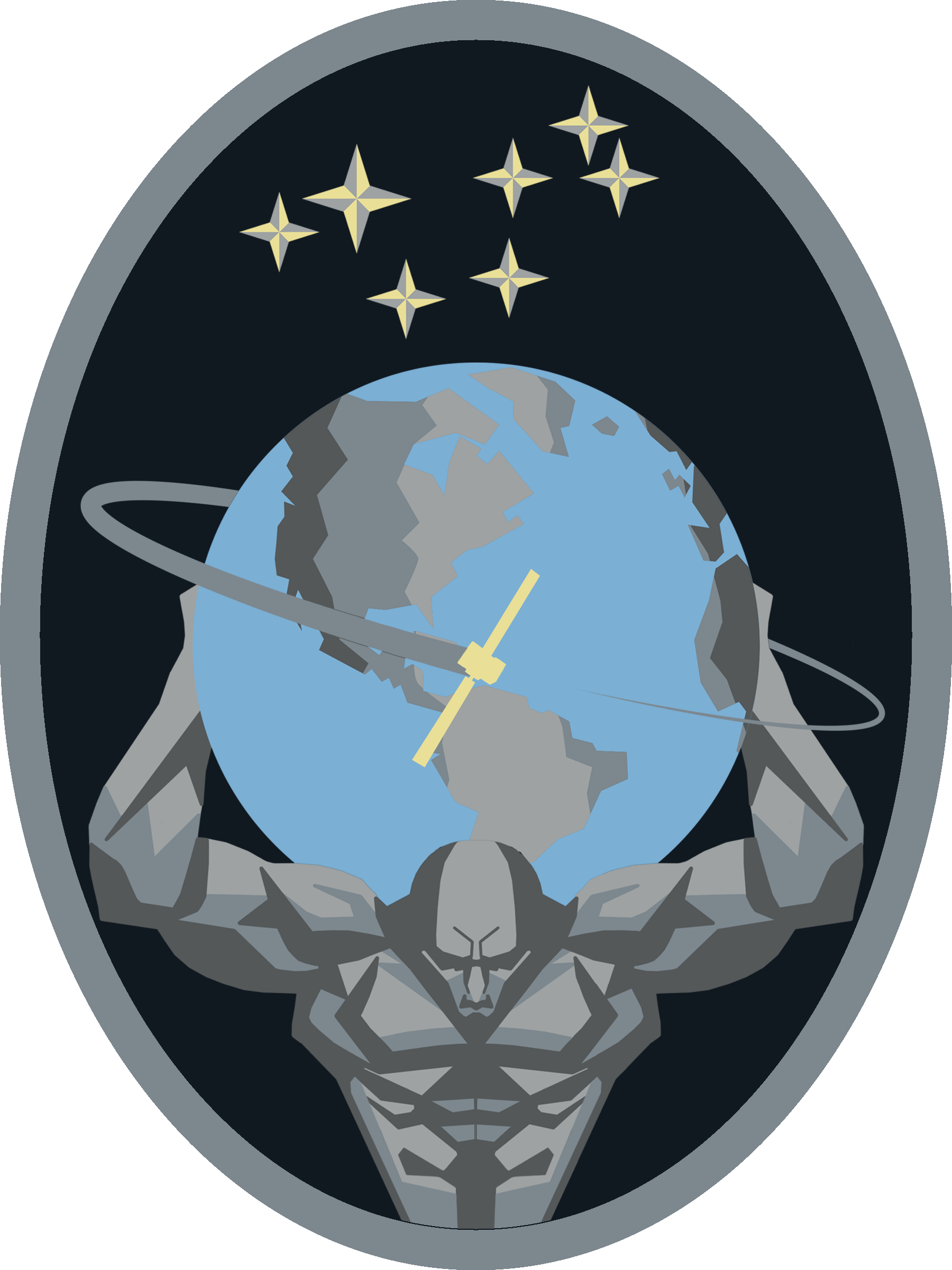
- Squadron emblem
- Active: 29 June 2022–present
- Country: United States
- Branch: United States Space Force
- Type: Squadron
- Role: Satellite Control
- Part of: Mission Delta 8
- Headquarters: Schriever Space Force Base, Colorado, U.S.
- Motto: "Hold the Sky... Titans in Space!"

Commanders
- Commander: Lt Col D. Susan Rogers
- Superintendent: SMSgt Raymond T. Flores

The 53rd Space Operations Squadron (53 SOPS) is a United States Space Force unit. Assigned to the Combat Forces Command's Mission Delta 8, it is responsible for providing payload and transmission command and control of the Wideband Global SATCOM and Defense Satellite Communications System constellations. It is headquartered at Schriever Space Force Base, Colorado. Whereas the 4th Space Operations Squadron (4 SOPS) operates the satellite "bus" (e.g. the solar cells, batteries, propulsion, etc), the 53 SOPS is responsible for operating the mission payload - high capacity "wideband" military satellite communications.

== History ==
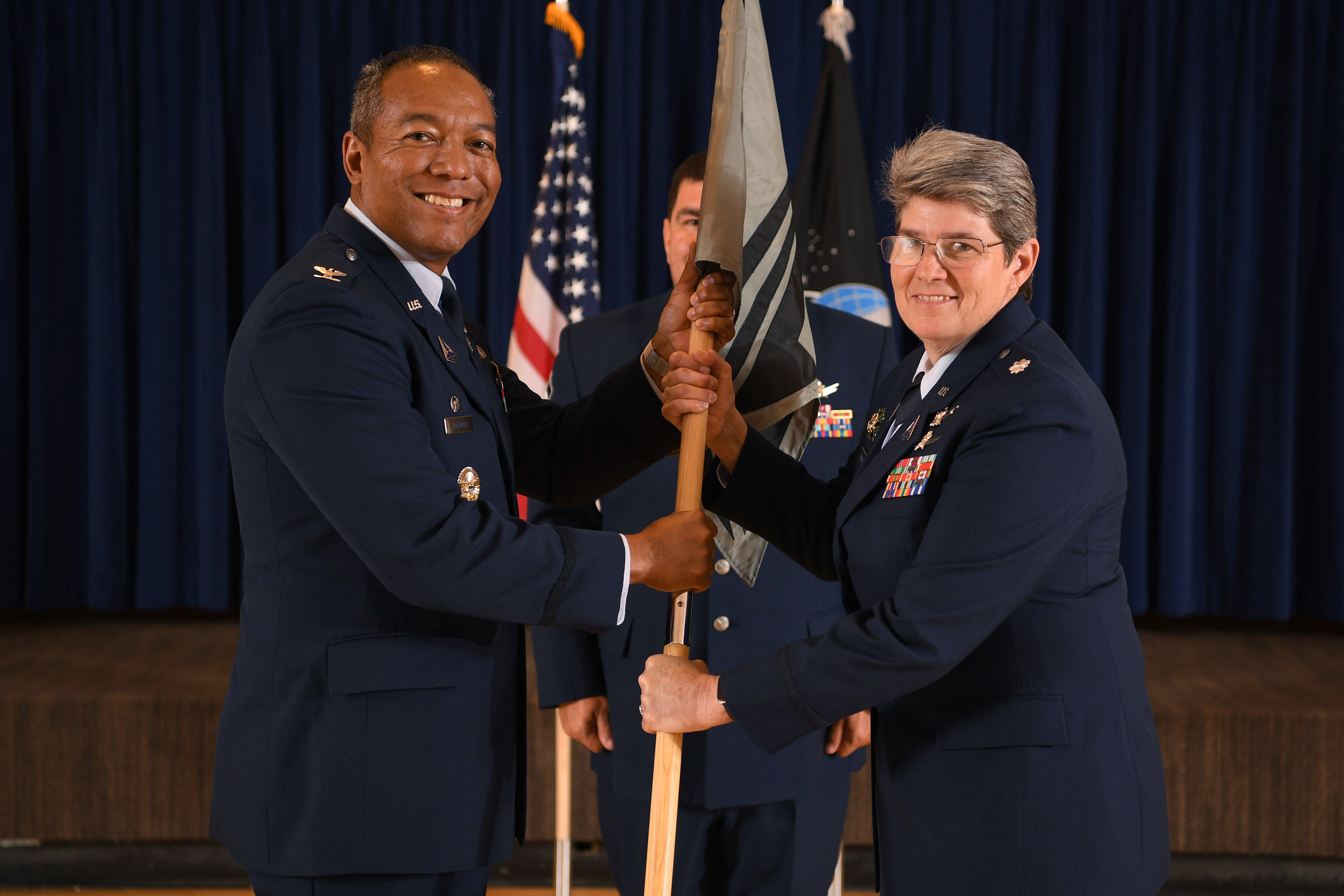
Col Holston gives the unit guidon to Lt Col Rogers during the activation of 53 SOPS, 29 June 2022

The Squadron's namesake comes from the Army's 53rd Signal Battalion, which before deactivation was assigned the U.S. Army Space and Missile Defense Command's U.S. Army Satellite Operations Brigade. In September 2021, it was announced that the Battalion's operational mission and personnel would be transferred to the United States Space Force. Activated on 29 June 2022 at a ceremony held at Peterson Space Force Base, the Squadron became the newest unit within the United States Space Force. The unit is distinct in its mission, being the sole armed forces entity to control payload functionality for all U.S. Wideband MILSATCOM.

== Emblem symbolism ==
The 53d Space Operations Squadron's emblem consists of the following elements:

- Platinum represents the men and women of Space Operations Command.
- Atlas and the Globe symbolize the unwavering strength and support 53d Space Operations Squadron Guardians provide globally to warfighters, interdepartmental, and multinational partners.
- The spacecraft and orbit signify Guardians' mastery of payloads and transmission control through generations of communications platforms.
- The constellation Pleiades pays homage to the organization's past as a United States Army unit and the seven stars represent previous command structure and operational elements at each Wideband Satellite Operations Center. Ancient stories depict the Pleiades as a group of loved ones who left their way of life to ascend to the heavens, and the 53d Space Operations Squadron embodies these stories in its transfer to the United States Space Force.

== Structure ==
Headquarters, Schriever Space Force Base, Colorado

- Detachment 1, Fort Detrick, Maryland
- Detachment 2, Fort Meade, Maryland
- Detachment 3, Landstuhl, Germany - Activated 19 July 2022
- Detachment 4, Wahiawa, Hawaii - Changed from Camp Roberts, California to Wahiawa, Hawaii in 2011
- Detachment 5, Fort Buckner, Japan

== List of commanders ==
- Lt Col D. Susan Rogers, 29 June 2022

== List of superintendents ==
- SMSgt Raymond T. Flores, 29 June 2022

== See also ==
- Space Delta 8
- 10th Space Operations Squadron
- U.S. Army Satellite Operations Brigade
