= Discrete Applied Mathematics =

- Discipline: Discrete mathematics, applied mathematics
- Language: English
- Edited by: Endre Boros

Publication details
- History: 1979–present
- Publisher: Elsevier
- Open access: no
- Impact factor: 1.139 (2020)

Standard abbreviations
- ISO 4: Discrete Appl. Math.

Indexing
- ISSN: 0166-218X
- LCCN: sf97095038
- OCLC no.: 123479568

Links
- Journal homepage; Online access

Discrete Applied Mathematics is a peer-reviewed scientific journal covering algorithmic and applied areas of discrete mathematics. It is published by Elsevier and the editor-in-chief is Endre Boros (Rutgers University). The journal was split off from another Elsevier journal, Discrete Mathematics, in 1979, with that journal's founder Peter Ladislaw Hammer as its founding editor-in-chief.

== Abstracting and indexing ==
The journal is abstracted and indexing in:

- ACM Computing Reviews
- Cambridge Scientific Abstracts
- Current Contents/Physics, Chemical, & Earth Sciences
- International Abstracts in Operations Research
- Mathematical Reviews
- Engineering Index
- Inspec
- PASCAL
- Science Citation Index
- Scopus
- Zentralblatt MATH

According to the Journal Citation Reports, the journal has a 2020 impact factor of 1.139.
