= Kürşad =

Kürşad is a Turkish given name for males. Notable people with the name include:

- Kürşad Türkşen, an biochemist
- Kürşad Tüzmen (born 1958), Turkish civil servant

== See also ==
- Kürsat
