= Comprehensive Therapy =

- Language: English
- Edited by: Martin Szanto

Publication details
- History: 1975-2010
- Publisher: Humana Press, from 2008 American Society of Contemporary Medicine and Surgery (United States)
- Frequency: Quarterly

Standard abbreviations
- ISO 4: Compr. Ther.

Indexing
- ISSN: 0098-8243 (print); 1559-1190 (web)
- OCLC no.: 2242426

Links
- Journal homepage; Journal page at society website; Online archive

Comprehensive Therapy was a quarterly peer-reviewed medical journal covering clinical diagnosis, pharmacology, treatment, and disease management. It was established in 1975 and published by Humana Press until 2008, when the American Society of Contemporary Medicine and Surgery, of which it had been an official journal, took over. The journal was discontinued in 2010. It was abstracted and indexed in Index Medicus/MEDLINE/PubMed, CINAHL, and Scopus.
