= Biological Procedures Online =

- Discipline: Biomedicine
- Language: English
- Edited by: Bolin Liu (Preceded by Shulin Li)

Publication details
- History: 1997–present
- Publisher: Springer (United States)
- Open access: Yes
- Impact factor: 3.244 (2020)

Standard abbreviations
- ISO 4: Biol. Proced. Online

Indexing
- ISSN: 1480-9222
- OCLC no.: 43835506

Links
- Journal homepage

Biological Procedures Online is a peer-reviewed, biomedical protocols journal that is open access and published online only. Biological Procedures Online publishes protocols in research techniques and applications of existing techniques; validity analysis of research methods and approaches for judging the validity of research reports; hypothesis development and experimental design; application of common research methods; and reviews of techniques. The editor-in-chief of the journal is Bolin Liu, and the editorial board members are Marxa Figueiredo, Julie Gehl, David Gewirtz, Todd Giorgio, Ching-Hung Hsu, Sek-Wen W Hui, Robert Kapsa, Hans-Peter Kiem, Hamed Kioumarsi, Song Li, David Liberles, Vinata B Lokeshwar, Claudio Luparello, J. Michael Mathis, Lluis Mir, Tom Misteli, Craig Nunemaker, Mauro Provinciali, Rajagopal Ramesh, Paul Shapshak, and Liangfang Zhang. Chunxia Su, Shaomian Yao, Chindo Hicks, Runhua Liu, and Gangadhara R Sareddy serve as associate editors for the journal.

According to the Journal Citation Reports, the journal has a 2020 impact factor of 3.244.

== History ==
Biological Procedures Online was founded in 1997 by Mark Reimer, a surgeon at the University of Waterloo, Canada, and Irem Ali, now Director of Operations for Biological Procedures. The journal began publishing peer-reviewed articles the following year. The journal was accepted into the Web of Science in 2007. In 2009, Springer Science+Business Media began publishing the journal.
