= United States Space Forces – Europe and Africa =

- USSPACEFOR-EURAF emblem
- Founded: 8 December 2023; 1054 days
- Country: United States
- Branch: United States Space Force
- Type: Component field command
- Role: Space operations
- Size: ~30 personnel
- Part of: United States European Command; United States Africa Command
- Headquarters: Ramstein Air Base, Germany

Commanders
- Commander: Brig Gen Christopher Fernengel
- Deputy Commander: Col David A Pheasant
- Senior Enlisted Leader: CMSgt Alex Birkle

Insignia
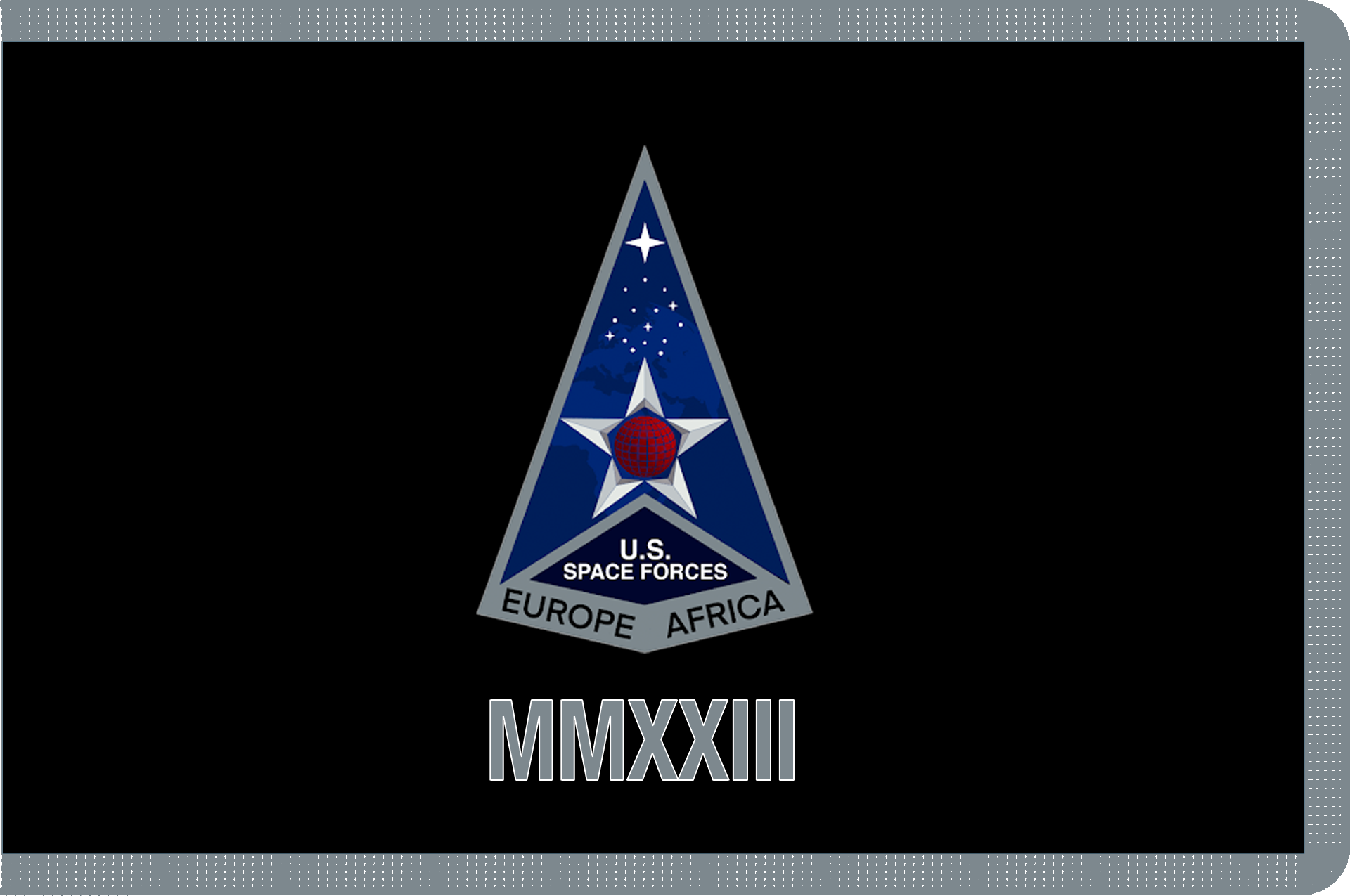
- Flag of the Space Force Europe and Africa Command

The United States Space Forces – Europe and Africa (USSPACEFOR-EURAF) is the United States Space Force component field command to the United States European Command and United States Africa Command. It plans, coordinates, supports, and conducts employment of space operations across the full range of military operations, including security cooperation, in support of the combatant commands' objectives. It was activated on 8 December 2023.

== History ==
=== List of directors of space forces ===
- Col Larry J. Chodzko, July 2007 – ???
- Col James A. Quinn, April 2019 – August 2022
- Col Max E. Lantz II, August 2022 – 8 December 2023

=== Establishment ===
In 2022, the Space Force started building component field commands in the United States Indo-Pacific Command, United States Central Command, and United States Forces Korea. A similar unit in Europe was planned to be activated after those first units. In September 2023, General B. Chance Saltzman announced that SPACEFOR-EURAF would be the fourth component field command. A month later, the United States European Command announced that the unit will be activated on 8 December 2023 with Col Max E. Lantz II, then the director of staff for USAFE-AFAFRICA, as the inaugural commander. The unit was activated on 8 December 2023 in a ceremony attended by General Saltzman, General Michael E. Langley, and Lieutenant General Steven L. Basham.

USSPACEFOR-EURAF had a supporting role in Operation Epic Fury during the Iran war that began on 28 February 2026.

== List of commanders ==
No.	Commander		Term			Ref
No.	Portrait	Name	Took office	Left office	Term length	Ref
1	Max E. Lantz II	Colonel; Max E. Lantz II (born 1969)	8 December 2023	13 August 2024	249 days	
2	Jacob Middleton Jr.	Brigadier General; Jacob Middleton Jr. (born c. 1970)	13 August 2024	10 August 2026	1 year, 362 days	
3	Christopher Fernengel	Brigadier General; Christopher Fernengel (born c. 1978)	10 August 2026	Incumbent	78 days	-

== See also ==
- United States European Command
- United States Africa Command
- United States Space Force
- United States Air Forces in Europe – Air Forces Africa
