= UHF Follow-On satellite =

United States Department of Defense satellite program

Ultra High Frequency Follow-On
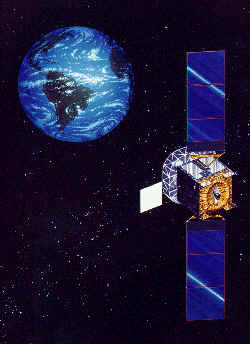
- Artist's impression of a UHF Follow-On satellite in orbit
- Country of origin: United States
- Operator: United States Space Force
- Applications: Military communications

Specifications
- Bus: HS-601
- Launch mass: 2,844 kg (6,270 lb)
- Regime: Geosynchronous orbit
- Design life: 14 years (planned)

Production
- Status: Active
- Built: 11
- Launched: 11
- Lost: 1
- Maiden launch: 25 March 1993
- Last launch: 18 December 2003

Ultra High Frequency Follow-On (UFO) satellite system is a United States Department of Defense (DoD) program sponsored and operated by the United States Space Force to provide communications for airborne, ship, submarine and ground forces. The UFO constellation replaced the U.S. DoD Fleet Satellite Communications System (FLTSATCOM) constellation and consisted of eleven satellites. The ground terminal segment consists of equipment and resident personnel at existing satellite communication stations. The satellites are controlled by the 10th Space Operations Squadron (Space Delta 8) located at the Naval Base Ventura County, Point Mugu, California.

== Satellite description ==
The Ultra high frequency (UHF) satellites primarily served tactical users. UFO provided almost twice as many channels as FLTSATCOM and has about 10% more power per channel. THe satellites were built by Boeing Integrated Defense Systems (formerly Hughes Space and Communications Company) and were based on the 601 series of communications satellites.

The Extremely high frequency (EHF) package on satellites four through eleven have an Earth coverage beam and a steerable five-degree spot beam that enhances its tactical use. The EHF capability also allows the UFO network to connect to the strategic Milstar system. Satellites eight, nine and ten also carry the Global Broadcast Service antennas that operate in the Ka-band. The Atlas was the launch vehicle of choice; however, space shuttle compatibility existed. The UFO bus and payload weigh 2,844 kg (6,270 lb). The solar panels spans 18.4 m (60 ft) and produces 2,500 watts at the end of the planned 14-year lifetime. The UHF system supports stationary and mobile users including manportable, ships, submarines, aircraft and other mobile terminals. The UFO Follow-On system is scheduled for replacement by the Mobile User Objective System (MUOS).

== Block Upgrades ==
Block 1 satellites had UHF and SHF communications. Block 2 satellites, starting with UHF 4, added extremely high frequency package with 11 channels. Block 3 satellites replaced the SFH communications with Ka-band transponders. Block 4 satellite incorporated a digital UHF receiver and two additional UHF channels.

== Launch ==
First launch of the UFO took place on 25 March 1993, with constellation completion dependent on replacement needs for the aging FLTSATCOM constellation.

== Table of Satellites ==
Launch	Designation	COSPAR ID	Launch Vehicle	Launch Date	Block	Status
1	UHF F/O 1	1993-015A	Atlas 1	1993-03-25	1	Placed in unusable orbit
2	UHF F/O 2	1993-056A	Atlas 1	1993-09-03	1	
3	UHF F/O 3	1994-035A	Atlas 1	1994-06-24	1	
4	UHF F/O 4	1995-003A	Atlas 2	1995-01-29	2	
5	UHF F/O 5	1995-027A	Atlas 2	1995-05-31	2	
6	UHF F/O 6	1995-057A	Atlas 2	1995-10-22	2	
7	UHF F/O 7	1996-042A	Atlas 2	1996-07-25	2	
8	UHF F/O 8	1998-016A	Atlas 2	1998-03-16	3	
9	UHF F/O 9	1998-058A	Atlas 2A	1998-10-20	3	
10	UHF F/O 10	1999-063A	Atlas 2A	1998-11-23	3	
11	UHF F/O 11	2003-057A	Atlas 3B-SEC	2003-12-18	4	
