= Matthew Holston =

U.S. Space Force general officer

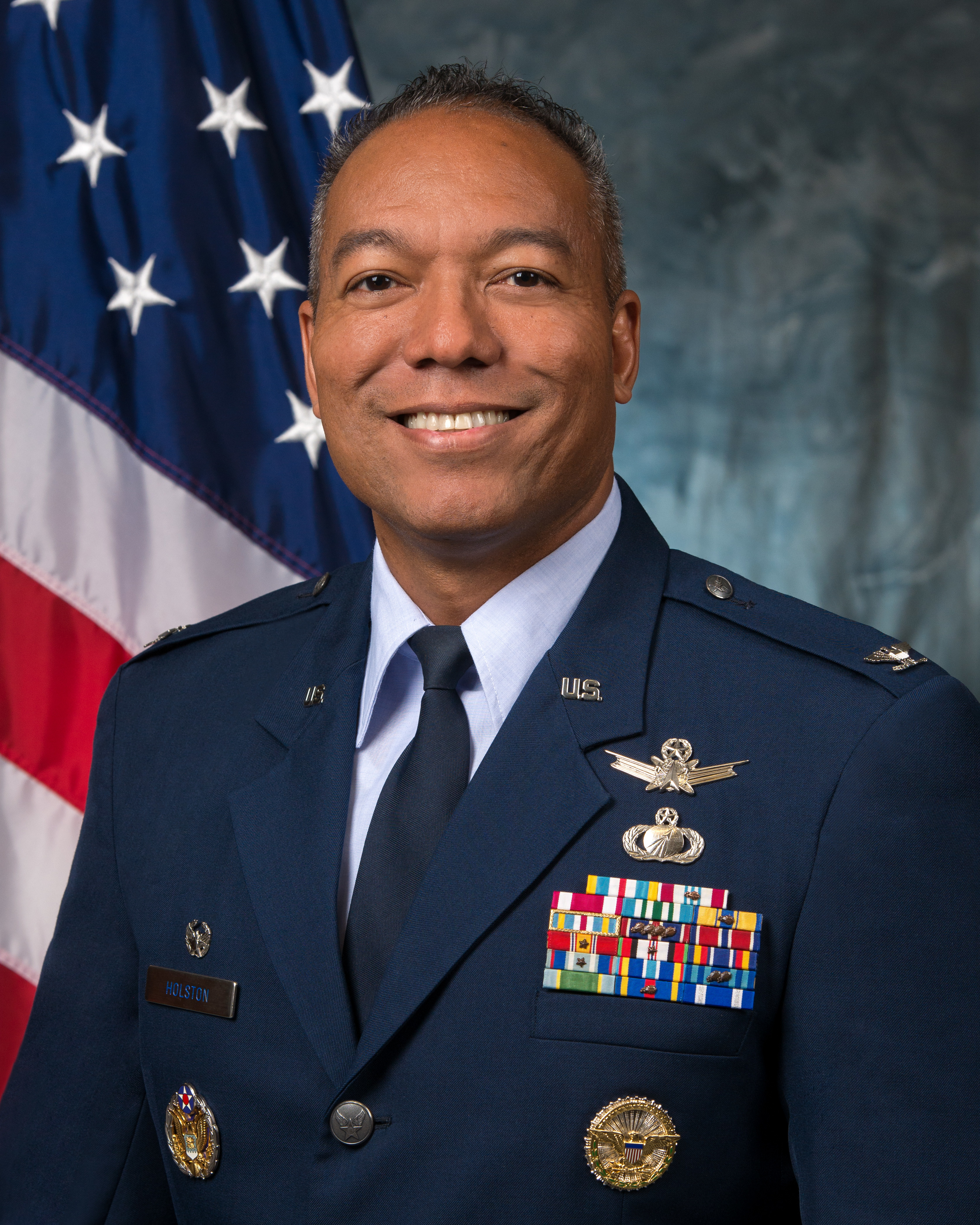
- Born: c. 1976 (age 49–50)
- Alma mater: University of Illinois Urbana-Champaign (BA); Air Force Institute of Technology (MS)
- Military career
- Allegiance: United States
- Branch: United States Air Force: United States Space Force
- Service years: 1999–2021 (Air Force): 2021–present (Space Force)
- Rank: Brigadier General
- Commands: Space Delta 8; 50th Operations Group; 45th Launch Support Squadron

Matthew E. Holston (born c. 1976) is a United States Space Force brigadier general who serves as the director of Personnel Management Act Integration Office. He served as commander of Space Delta 8 from 2020 to 2022.

In 2025, Holston was nominated and confirmed for promotion to brigadier general.

== Military career ==
1. February 1999–December 1999, Student, Undergraduate Space and Missile Training and Defense Satellite Communications System Satellite Vehicle Operator Training, Vandenberg Air Force Base, Calif.
2. December 1999–August 2003, Satellite Vehicle Operator and Engineer, then DSCS Launch Manager, 3rd Space Operations Squadron, Schriever AFB, Colo.
3. September 2003–July 2005, Flight Commander, then Chief, Launch Operations, National Reconnaissance Office Operations Squadron, Colorado Springs, Colo.
4. July 2005–March 2007, Student, Air Force Institute of Technology, Wright-Patterson AFB, Ohio.
5. March 2007–December 2009, Chief Payload Systems Engineer, then Chief, Payload Hardware Branch, Reconnaissance Systems Office, NRO, Chantilly, Va.
6. December 2009–August 2011, Executive Officer to the Director, Imagery Intelligence Directorate, NRO, Chantilly, Va.
7. August 2011–July 2012, Student, National Intelligence University, Bolling AFB, Washington, D.C.
8. July 2012–July 2014, Program Element Monitor for Military Satellite Communications Programs, Office of the Assistant Secretary of the Air Force for Acquisition, Washington, D.C. (October 2013–April 2014, Staff Officer, Key Leader Engagements Branch, Kabul, Afghanistan)
9. July 2014–July 2016, Commander, 45th Launch Support Squadron, Cape Canaveral Air Force Station, Fla.
10. July 2016–July 2017, Military Assistant to the Assistant Secretary of the Air Force for Acquisition, Office of the Assistant Secretary of the Air Force for Acquisition, Pentagon, Washington, D.C.
11. August 2017–June 2018, Student, Eisenhower School for National Security and Resource Strategy, Fort Lesley J. McNair, Washington, D.C.
12. June 2018–June 2020, Deputy Director, Space and Special Programs, Battlespace Awareness and Program Assessment Directorate, Office of the Under Secretary of Defense for Intelligence, Pentagon, Washington, D.C.
13. June 2020–July 2020, Commander, 50th Operations Group, Schriever AFB, Colo.
14. July 2020–present, Commander, Delta 8, Schriever SFB, Colo.

== Dates of promotion ==
Rank	Branch	Date
Second Lieutenant	Air Force	January 19, 1999
First Lieutenant	Air Force	January 19, 2001
Captain	Air Force	January 19, 2003
Major	Air Force	September 1, 2008
Lieutenant Colonel	Air Force	February 1, 2014
Colonel	Air Force	February 1, 2020
Colonel	Space Force	~June 24, 2021
Brigadier General	Space Force	~November 2025

Military offices
New command	Commander of Space Delta 8; 2020–2022	Succeeded by Nicole M. Petrucci
Preceded by James J. Watson	Senior Executive Officer to the Chief of Space Operations; 2022–2023	Succeeded by Casey Beard
Preceded by Jacob Middleton Jr.	Director of National Security Space Policy at the National Space Council; 2023–2025	Succeeded by ???
New office	Director of Personnel Management Act Integration Office of the United States Space Force; 2025–present	Incumbent
