= Springer Protocols =

Springer Protocols was a database of life sciences protocols published by Springer Science+Business Media. It replaced BioMed Protocols, a Humana Press database, in January 2008, and was deactivated on 25 July 2018. The protocols were then available on the SpringerLink website.

The protocols are "recipes" that allow scientists to recreate experiments in their own laboratory. Springer Protocols contained more than 33,000 protocols, most of which were derived from the book series Methods in Molecular Biology, published under the Humana Press imprint. That book series, edited by John M. Walker since 1984, contains more than 1,100 volumes and has spawned several related book series.

== Areas of study ==
Springer Protocols consisted of protocols from many Humana Press book series, most notably Methods in Molecular Biology, Methods in Molecular Medicine, Methods in Biotechnology, Methods in Pharmacology and Toxicology, and Neuromethods. Among the subjects covered were biochemistry, bioinformatics, biotechnology, cancer research, cell biology, genetics/genomics, imaging/radiology, immunology, infectious diseases, microbiology, molecular medicine, neuroscience, pharmacology/toxicology, plant science, and protein science.

== Website specifics ==
The website was hosted by online journal provider MPS Technologies’ JournalStore platform. Among the features on the site were full-text indexing, RSS feeds, bookmarks, saved searches, comments sections for each protocol, and upload a protocol. The site also featured video protocols, produced in conjunction with the Journal of Visualized Experiments, a web-based, video journal for biological research.
