= Space Delta 8 =

U.S. Space Force satellite communications

Mission Delta 8
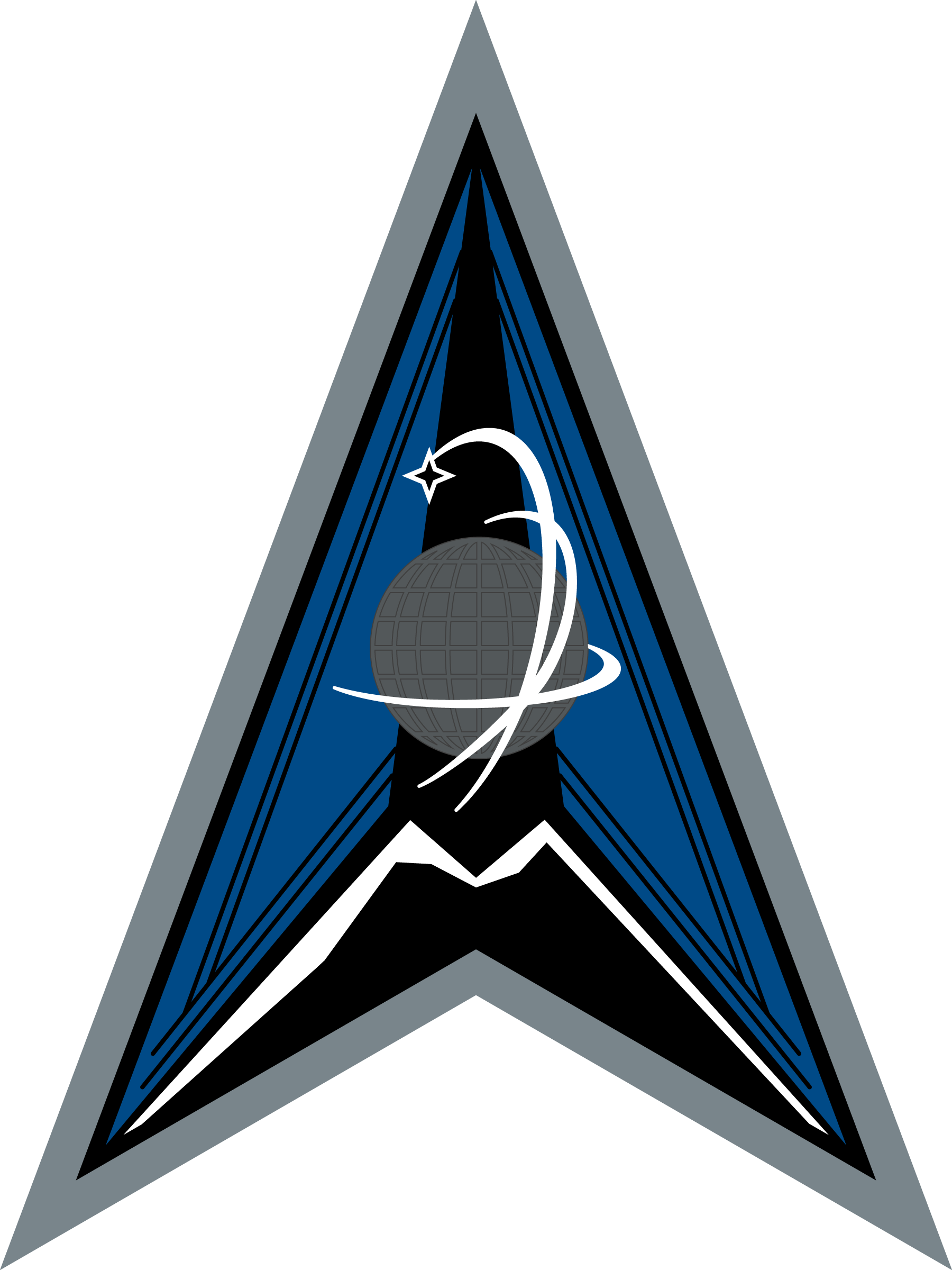
- Delta emblem
- Founded: 24 July 2020; 5 years ago
- Country: United States
- Branch: United States Space Force
- Type: Delta
- Role: Satellite communication
- Size: 2500 personnel
- Part of: United States Space Force Combat Forces Command
- Headquarters: Schriever Space Force Base, Colorado, U.S.
- Motto: "Step Into the Arena"
- Website: Official website

Commanders
- Commander: Col Kara L. Sartori
- Deputy Commander: Col Edward Ferguson
- Senior Enlisted Leader: CMSgt Stephen M. Shockey

Insignia
- Guidon

Mission Delta 8 (MD 8) is the United States Space Force unit responsible for military satellite communications and operates a variety of satellite constellation. It is headquartered at Schriever Space Force Base, Colorado.

== History ==
Before the founding of an independent Space Force, the Air Force Space Command's (AFSPC) 50th Operations Group (50 OG), part of the 50th Space Wing, performed the satellite communications and position, navigation, and timing missions. As part of the reorganization in the stand-up of Space Force, 50 OG was inactivated and DEL 8 was activated on 24 July 2020. On 8 February 2022, the 50th Operations Support Squadron was inactivated and the 8th Combat Training Squadron was activated.

In September 2021, the Space Force publicly identified Army and Navy satellite communications units that would transfer to the new Delta. On 6 June 2022, the Naval Satellite Operations Center transferred as the 10th Space Operations Squadron, followed on 29 June 2022 by the Army's 53rd Signal Battalion, which became the 53rd Space Operations Squadron.

On 7 July 2022, Colonel David Pheasant, a former Army officer who had once commanded the 53rd Signal Battalion, took command of DEL 8, becoming the first inter-service transfer officer to command a Space Force Delta.

In 2023, the 2nd Space Operations Squadron was transferred to the Positioning, Navigation, and Timing Integrated Mission Delta (Provisional) with the transfer of the position, navigation, and timing mission set into the new unit.

== Structure ==
DEL 8 is composed of four squadrons.

Emblem	Name	Function	Headquarters	Spacecraft
Squadrons
	8th Combat Training Squadron	Operational training and certification, tactics development, engineering support, and crew force management	Schriever Space Force Base, Colorado	
	4th Space Operations Squadron	Satellite communication	Schriever Space Force Base, Colorado	Advanced Extremely High Frequency; Defense Satellite Communications System Phase III; Military Strategic and Tactical Relay; Wideband Global Satellite Communications
	10th Space Operations Squadron	Satellite communication	Point Mugu, California	Mobile User Objective System; Ultra-High Frequency Follow-On; Fleet Satellite Communications System
	53rd Satellite Operations Squadron	Satellite communication	Schriever Space Force Base, Colorado	Wideband Global SATCOM; Defense Satellite Communications System

== List of commanders ==
No.	Commander		Term			Ref
No.	Portrait	Name	Took office	Left office	Duration	Ref
1	Matthew E. Holston	Colonel; Matthew E. Holston	24 July 2020	7 July 2022	1 year, 348 days	
2	David A. Pheasant	Colonel; David A. Pheasant	7 July 2022	24 June 2024	1 year, 353 days	
3	Jeffery E. Weisler	Colonel; Jeffery E. Weisler	24 June 2024	2 July 2026	2 years, 8 days	
4	Kara L. Sartori	Colonel; Kara L. Sartori	2 July 2026	Incumbent	13 days	

== See also ==
- Space Operations Command
- Structure of the United States Space Force
