= Kürsat =

Kürşat may refer to:

- Kürşat Duymuş (born 1979), Turkish footballer
- Osman Kürşat Duman (born 1987), Turkish footballer
- Kürşat Mican (born 1982), Turkish politician and author
- Volkan Kürşat Bekiroğlu (born 1977), Turkish footballer

== See also ==
- Kürşad
- Kürşat (hero)
