= Cellular Oncology =

- Discipline: Oncology
- Language: English
- Edited by: Cun Wang, Xiaohang Qiao

Publication details
- Former name(s): Analytical Cellular Pathology
- History: 1989-present
- Publisher: Springer Science+Business Media
- Frequency: Bimonthly
- Open access: Hybrid
- Impact factor: 6.6 (2022)

Standard abbreviations
- ISO 4: Cell. Oncol.

Indexing
- ISSN: 2211-3428 (print); 2211-3436 (web)

Links
- Journal homepage

Cellular Oncology is a bimonthly peer-reviewed medical journal published by Springer Science+Business Media. The journal was established in 1989 as Analytical Cellular Pathology, obtaining its current name in 2003. It is an official publication of the International Society for Cellular Oncology and is published six times a year. The journal covers basic cancer research.

According to the Journal Citation Reports, the journal has a 2022 impact factor of 6.6.
