= 50th Operations Support Squadron =

U.S. Space Force unit

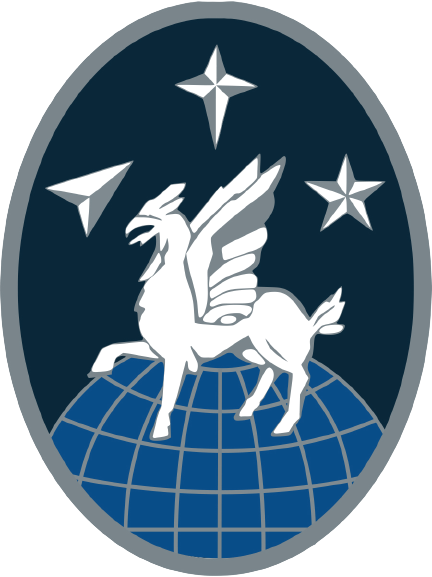
- Squadron emblem
- Active: 1943–1944; 1992–2022
- Country: United States
- Branch: United States Space Force
- Type: Squadron
- Role: Operations support
- Part of: Space Delta 8
- Headquarters: Schriever Space Force Base, Colorado, U.S.

Insignia
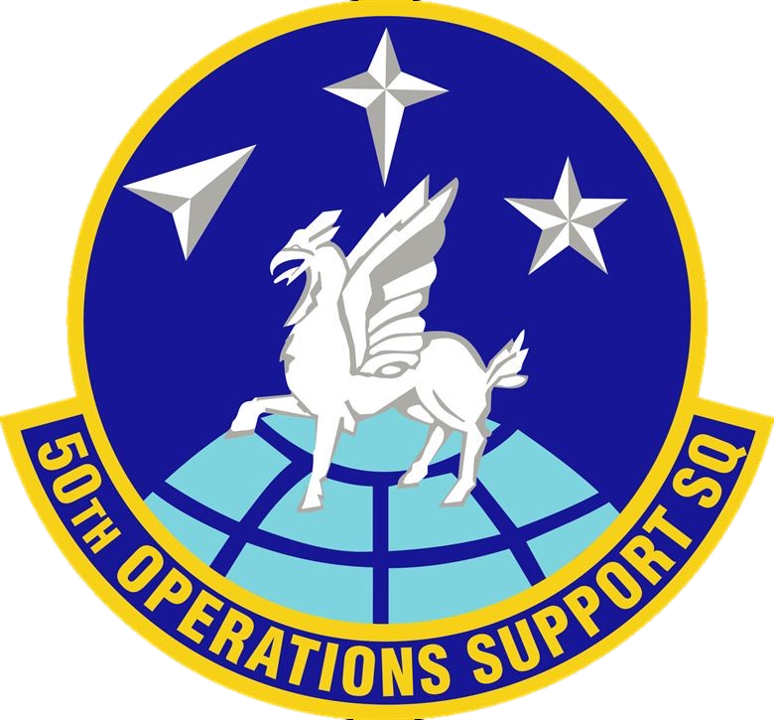
- Former 50th Operations Support Squadron emblem

The 50th Operations Support Squadron (50 OSS) was a United States Space Force unit assigned to Space Operations Command's Space Delta 8. It provided operations support to the delta by leading training, intelligence operations, tactics development. It was headquartered at Peterson Space Force Base, Colorado. For most of the squadron's existence, it was at Schriever AFB under the 50th Operations Group.

The squadron was inactivated on 8 February 2022 prior to the activation of the 8th Combat Training Squadron.

== List of commanders ==
- Lt Col Chris D. Crawford, April 2004
- Lt Col William B. Robey, 7 June 2006
- Lt Col Harold Martin, ~2008
- Lt Col Theresa Malasavage, 4 June 2010
- Lt Col Jack D. Fulmer II, June 2012
- Lt Col Daniel Burtz, 8 July 2014
- Lt Col Timothy Purcell, August 2015
- Lt Col David Gallagher, 26 June 2017
- Lt Col Alan Burwell, 12 July 2019
- Lt Col John Paek, 8 June 2021 – 8 February 2022

== See also ==
- Space Delta 8
