= Baltzer Science Publishers =

Dutch publisher of scientific journals

Baltzer Science Publishers is a defunct publisher of scientific journals. It was established in Amsterdam in 1980 as J. C. Baltzer AG by Christoph and Marianne Baltzer. The company was sold in 1994 and renamed Baltzer Science Publishers BV. It was bought by Wolters Kluwer in 2001 and subsequently subsumed into the Springer brand when Kluwer sold Kluwer Academic Publishers to two private equity funds, who shortly after merged it with BertelsmannSpringer to form Springer Science+Business Media.
