= Endre Boros =

Hungarian-American mathematician

- Born: September 21, 1953 (age 72)
- Known for: Director of the Center for Operations Research
- Scientific career
- Fields: Mathematics
- Institutions: Rutgers University

Endre Boros (born 21 September 1953) is a Hungarian-American mathematician, a distinguished professor at Rutgers University in New Brunswick, New Jersey, and the director of the Center for Operations Research (RUTCOR). He is the author of 15 book chapters and edited volumes, and 165 research papers. He is associate editor of the Annals of Mathematics and Artificial Intelligence, and Editor-in-Chief of both the Annals of Operations Research and Discrete Applied Mathematics.

== Results ==
Boros & Szőnyi (1986) settled a conjecture by Beniamino Segre about the cyclic structure of finite projective planes, and Boros (1988) provided the best known bound for a question posed by Paul Erdős about blocking sets of Galois planes. Boros & Gurvich (1996) proved that perfect graphs are kernel solvable which answered a longstanding open question by C. Berge and P. Duchet (and which is independent of the perfect graph theorem). He settled the complexity of generating all maximal frequent and minimal infrequent sets of large data sets answering questions by R.H. Sloan, K. Takata and G. Turán in Boros et al. (2003), and in Khachiyan et al. (2008) resolved the complexity of the longstanding open problem of generating all vertices of polyhedra.

Boros et al. (2008) uses a network flow based approach for quadratic binary optimization. In the area of the theory of Horn functions, Boros, Crama & Hammer (1990) proved that all "prime implicates" of a Horn CNF can be generated efficiently, extended Horn logic to q-Horn and showed that this extension forms in some sense the boundary between tractable and intractable logic.

== Selected publications ==
- Boros, E.; Szőnyi, T. (1986), "On the sharpness of a theorem of B. Segre", Combinatorica, 6 (3): 261–268, doi:10.1007/BF02579386, MR 0875293, S2CID 37521776.
- Boros, Endre (1988), "PG(2,p^{s}), p > 2 has property B(p + 2)", Ars Combinatoria, 25: 111–113, MR 0944353.
- Boros, Endre; Gurvich, Vladimir (1996), "Perfect graphs are kernel solvable", Discrete Mathematics, 159 (1–3): 35–55, doi:10.1016/0012-365X(95)00096-F, MR 1415280.
- Boros, E.; Gurvich, V.; Khachiyan, L.; Makino, K. (2003), "On maximal frequent and minimal infrequent sets in binary matrices", Annals of Mathematics and Artificial Intelligence, 39 (3): 211–221, doi:10.1023/A:1024605820527, MR 2017545, S2CID 2953353.
- Khachiyan, Leonid; Boros, Endre; Borys, Konrad; Elbassioni, Khaled; Gurvich, Vladimir (2008), "Generating all vertices of a polyhedron is hard", Discrete & Computational Geometry, 39 (1–3): 174–190, doi:10.1007/s00454-008-9050-5, MR 2383757.
- Boros, Endre; Hammer, Peter L.; Sun, Richard; Tavares, Gabriel (2008), "A max-flow approach to improved lower bounds for quadratic unconstrained binary optimization (QUBO)", Discrete Optimization, 5 (2): 501–529, doi:10.1016/j.disopt.2007.02.001, MR 2408438.
- Boros, Endre; Crama, Yves; Hammer, Peter L. (1990), "Polynomial-Time Inference of All Valid Implications for Horn and Related Formulae", Annals of Mathematics and Artificial Intelligence, 1 (1–4): 21–32, doi:10.1007/BF01531068, S2CID 12249959.
