= 8th Combat Training Squadron =

U.S. Space Force unit

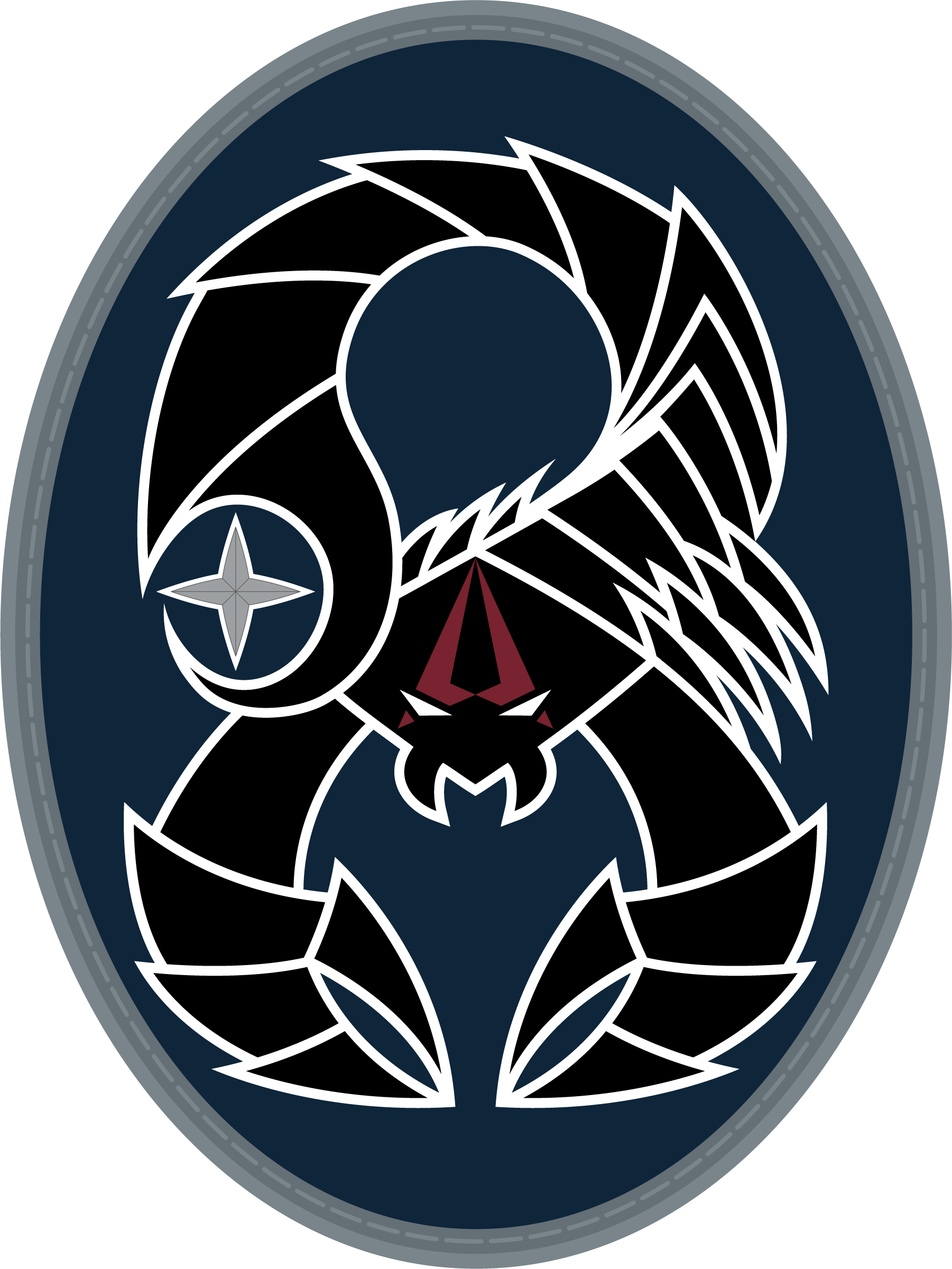
- 8 CTS emblem
- Active: 8 February 2022–present
- Country: United States
- Branch: United States Space Force
- Type: Squadron
- Role: Training
- Part of: Space Delta 8
- Headquarters: Schriever Space Force Base, Colorado, U.S.

Commanders
- Commander: Lt Col Zachary Lenard

The 8th Combat Training Squadron (8 CTS) is a United States Space Force unit responsible for training Space Delta 8 personnel. It was activated on 8 February 2022 after inactivating the 50th Operations Support Squadron.

== List of commanders ==
- Lt Col John Paek, 8 February 2022 – present

== See also ==
- Space Delta 8
