= Stem Cell Reviews and Reports =

- Discipline: Cell biology
- Language: English
- Edited by: Mariusz Z. Ratajczak

Publication details
- History: 2005-present
- Publisher: Springer Science+Business Media
- Frequency: Quarterly
- Impact factor: 6.692 (2021)

Standard abbreviations
- ISO 4: Stem Cell Rev. Rep.

Indexing
- ISSN: 1550-8943

Links
- Journal homepage

Stem Cell Reviews and Reports is a medical journal published quarterly by Springer Science+Business Media. It covers contemporary and emerging areas in stem cells, including embryonic and adult stem cells, and related lineage and cloning issues. The journal also publishes reviews covering basic, clinical, biotechnology, regulatory, and ethical aspects of stem cell research and applications. The journal got its current name in 2009 from Stem Cell Reviews. According to Journal Citation Reports, the journal has a 2021 impact factor of 6.692.
