= 10th Space Operations Squadron =

U.S. Space Force unit

- Squadron emblem
- Active: 1962–present
- Country: United States
- Branch: United States Space Force
- Role: Satellite communications
- Part of: Space Delta 8
- Headquarters: Point Mugu, California, U.S.

Commanders
- Commander: Lt Col Jesse Diaz

Insignia
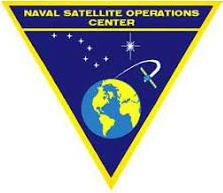
- Naval Satellite Operations Center (1990–2022)

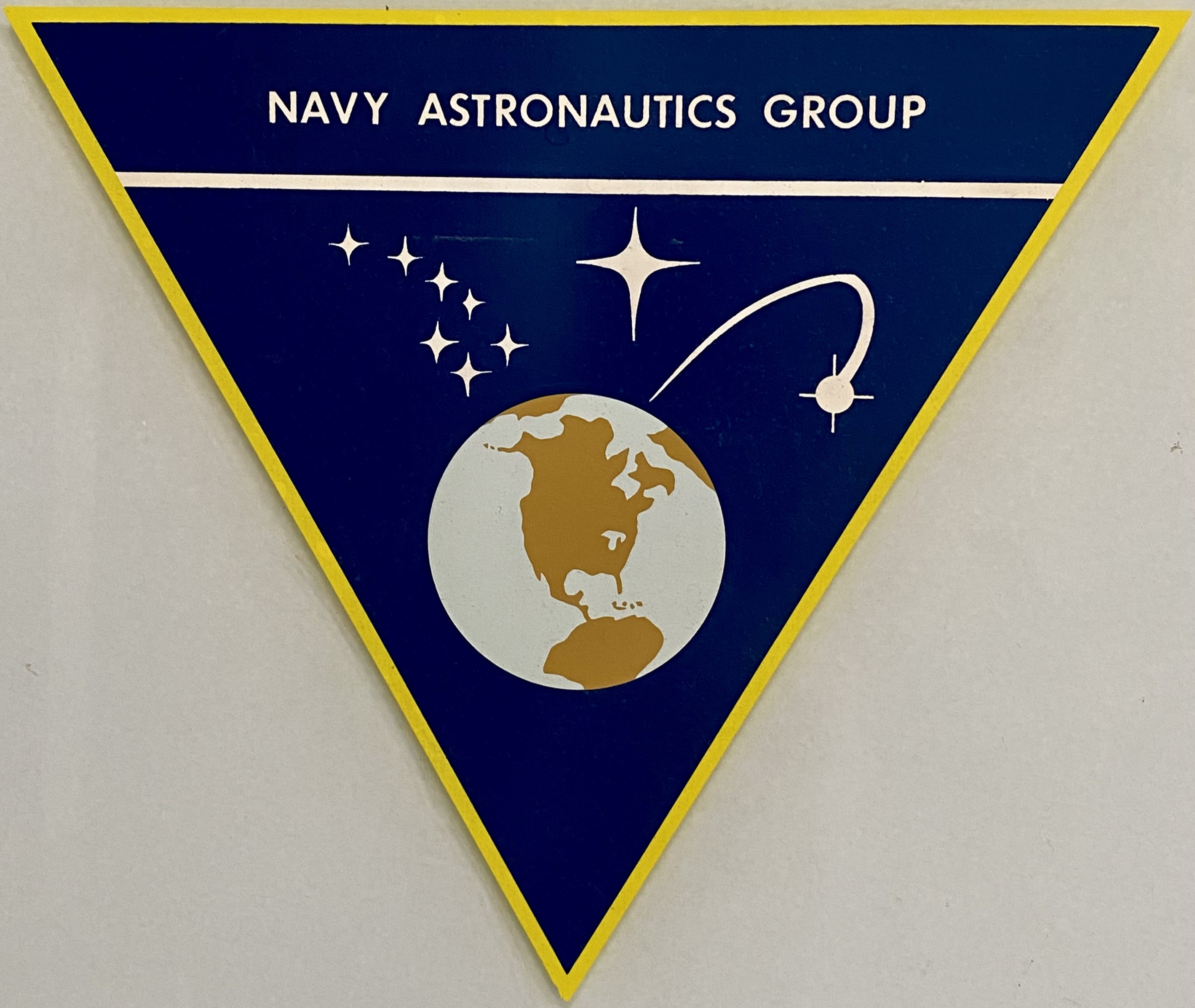
- Navy Astronautics Group (1962–1990)

The 10th Space Operations Squadron (10 SOPS) is the United States Space Force unit responsible for operating the Mobile User Objective System and Ultra-High Frequency Follow-On satellite constellations, providing global communications to the United States Armed Forces.

== History ==
=== Navy (1962–2022) ===
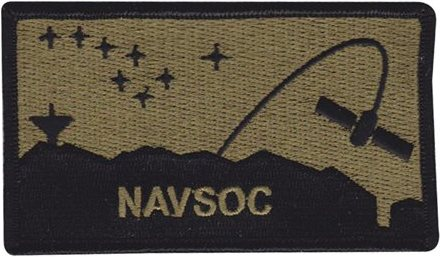
Navy Working Uniform "Type III" unit shoulder patch featuring the NAG emblem elements: Ursa Major and Polaris as a reference to celestial navigation and a stylized satellite orbiting Earth. Also shown are Laguna Peak and Mugu Rock.

The first military space operations command in history, the Navy Astronautics Group (e or NAG) was established on May 22, 1962 under the command of CDR J.C. Quillen, Jr. Tasked with operating the Navy's satellites, the unit commanded the Navy Navigational Satellite System, also known as Transit, the world's first satellite navigation system. The Navy Astronautics Group was redesignated as the Naval Satellite Operations Center (NAVSOC) in June 1990.

=== Space Force (2022-present) ===
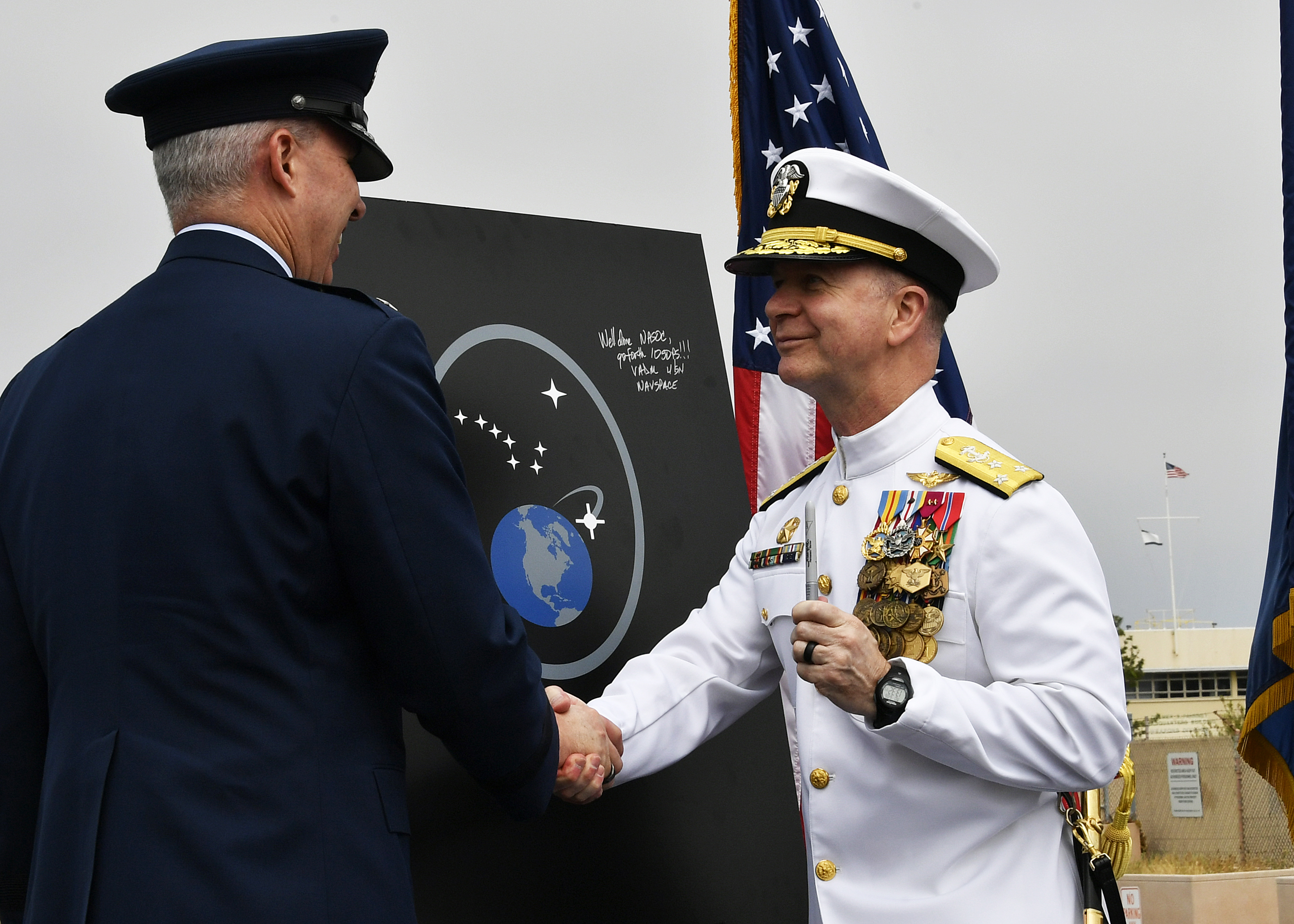
Lt Gen Stephen Whiting and VADM Ross Myers at the joint NAVSOC/10 SOPS ceremony on 6 June 2022.

In September 2021, it was announced that NAVSOC would be transferred from the Navy to the newly-independent US Space Force under Space Delta 8. On 6 June 2022, NAVSOC was formally disestablished and 10 SOPS assumed its mission, personnel, resources, and heritage in total. According to Space Delta 8, the squadron was given its number to honor its heritage under 10th Fleet.

== Constellations ==
The unit has operated various types of military satellites, including:

Constellation	Abbreviation	First launch	Purpose
Transit	NAVSAT or NNSS	1959	Navigation
Fleet Satellite Communications System	FLTSATCOM or FLTSAT	1978	Communication
Geodetic Satellite	GEOSAT	1985	Earth observation
Ultra High Frequency Follow-On	UFO	1993	Communication
Geodetic Satellite Follow-On	GFO	1998	Earth observation
Mobile User Objective System	MUOS	2012	Communication

== Command Structure ==
- Headquarters, Naval Base Ventura County, Point Mugu, California
  - Detachment A, Prospect Harbor, Maine
  - Detachment C, Naval Computer and Telecommunications Station, Dededo, Guam
  - Detachment D, Schriever SFB, El Paso County, Colorado

Former site:

- Detachment B, Rosemount, Minnesota (disestablished August 1997)

== List of commanders ==
- Lt Col Jason Sanders, 6 June 2022
- Lt Col Jesse Diaz, 10 June 2024
