= Naval Base Ventura County =

Group of US Navy installations near Oxnard, California

- Oxnard, California in United States
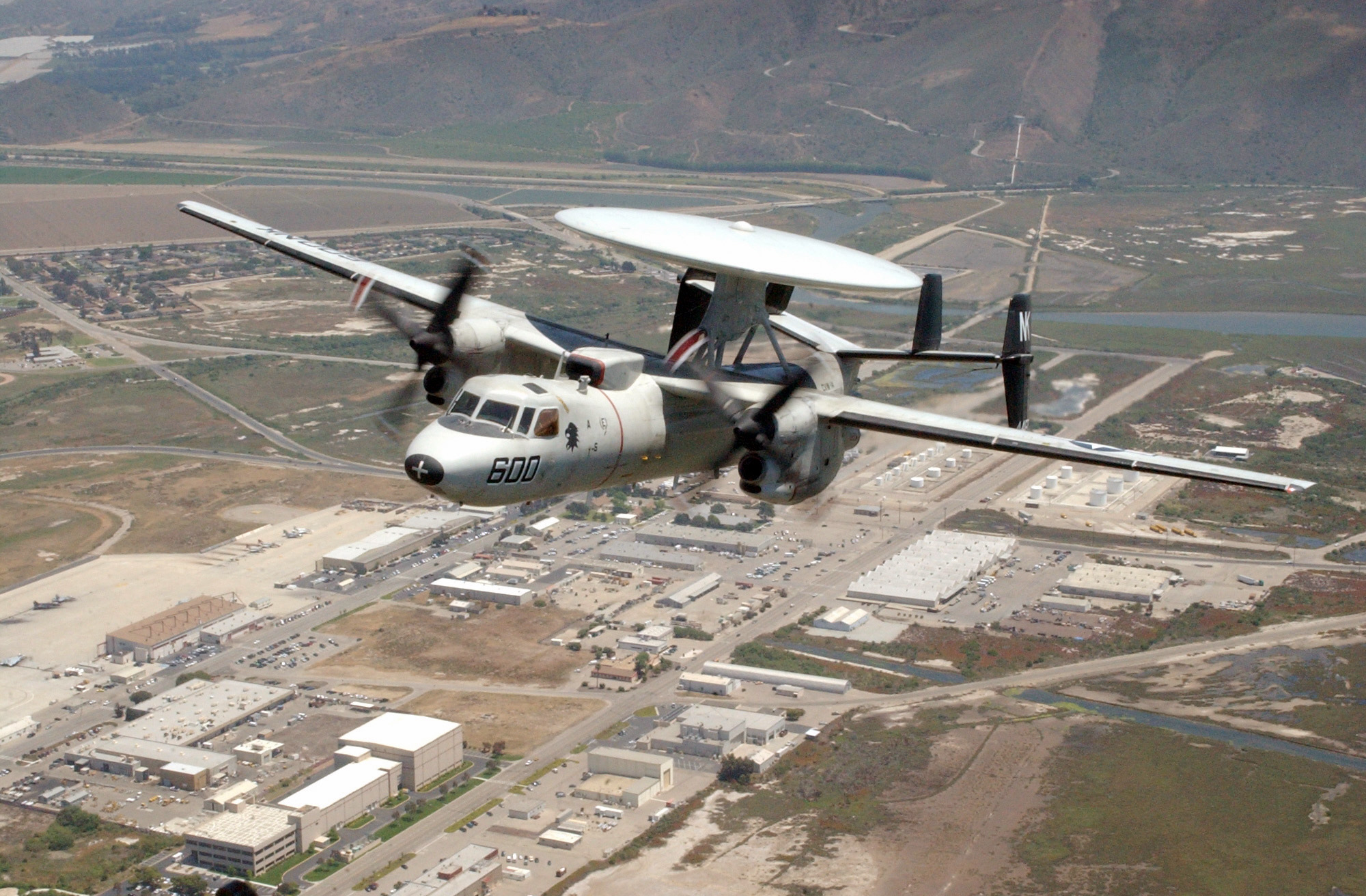
- A US Navy E-2C Hawkeye flies over NB Ventura County's Point Mugu facility

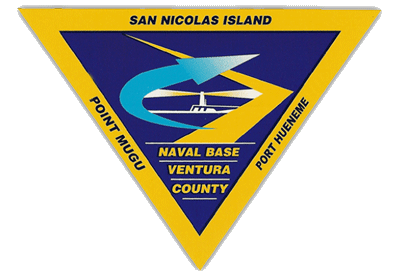

Site information
- Type: Naval Base
- Owner: Department of Defense
- Operator: US Navy
- Controlled by: Navy Region Southwest
- Condition: Operational
- Website: Official website

Location
- Location in the United States
- Coordinates: 34°07′13″N 119°07′16″W (Point Mugu); 34°09′16″N 119°12′39″W (Port Hueneme); 33°14′23″N 119°27′29″W (San Nicolas Island)

Site history
- Built: 1941–1942
- In use: 2000–present (as NB Ventura County)

Garrison information
- Current commander: Captain Jeff Chism

Airfield information
- Identifiers: IATA: NTD, ICAO: KNTD, FAA LID: NTD, WMO: 723910
- Elevation: 3.9 metres (13 ft) AMSL
Runways
Direction	Length and surface
03/21	3,383.8 metres (11,102 ft) Asphalt
09/27	1,677 metres (5,502 ft) Asphalt

Naval Base Ventura County (NBVC) is a United States Navy base in Ventura County, California. Formed by the merger of NAS Point Mugu and CBC Port Hueneme, NBVC is a diverse installation composed of three main locations — Point Mugu, Port Hueneme, and San Nicolas Island. The base serves as an all-in-one mobilization site, deep water port, railhead, and airfield. NBVC supports more than 100 tenant commands with a base population of more than 19,000 personnel, making it the largest employer in Ventura County.

== History ==
=== Naval Construction Battalion Center Port Hueneme ===
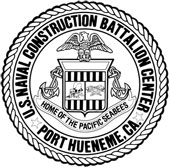
CBC Port Hueneme insignia

The facility at Port Hueneme was built as a temporary depot in the early days of World War II to train, stage, and supply the newly created Seabees (from "C.B.", the initials for "Construction Battalion"). The base was officially established and began operating May 18, 1942 as the Advance Base Depot. In 1945 the Advance Base Depot was renamed the Naval Construction Battalion Center.

During the Korean War, almost all Navy construction equipment and supplies for the war were routed through CBC Port Hueneme.

=== Naval Air Station Point Mugu ===
In 1941, as the United States entered World War II, Point Mugu also became a training area for the Seabees. The Seabees put down a section of Marston mat runway that would become Point Mugu's first airstrip. NAS Point Mugu served as an anti-aircraft training center during the war and was developed in the late 1940s into the Navy's major missile development and test facility. This facility was the site where most of the Navy's missiles were developed and tested during the 1950s and 1960s, including the AIM-7 Sparrow family and the AIM-54 Phoenix air-to-air, Bullpup air-to-surface, and Regulus surface-to-surface missiles.

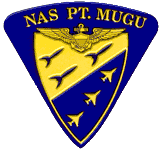
NAS Point Mugu insignia

NAS Point Mugu has dominated the area since the 1940s, and is one of the few places in the area that is not agricultural. The base has been home to many ordnance testing programs, and the test range extends offshore to the Navy-owned San Nicolas Island in the Channel Islands. In 1963 the U.S. Navy Marine Mammal Program was established on a sand spit between Mugu Lagoon and the ocean. The facility was relocated in 1967 to Point Loma in San Diego, California.

NAS Point Mugu was the airfield used by former President Ronald Reagan during his presidency on visits to his Santa Barbara ranch. The airfield was used during the state funeral in 2004, as the place where the former President's body was flown to Washington, D.C. to lie in state in the Capitol Rotunda. The body was flown to Point Mugu aboard presidential aircraft SAM 28000 two days later.

Until the late 1990s, the base hosted Antarctic Development Squadron SIX (VXE-6), the squadron of LC-130s equipped to land on ice in Antarctica, to supply the science stations there. Now, the New York Air National Guard's 109th Airlift Wing has assumed that responsibility.

=== Naval Base Ventura County ===
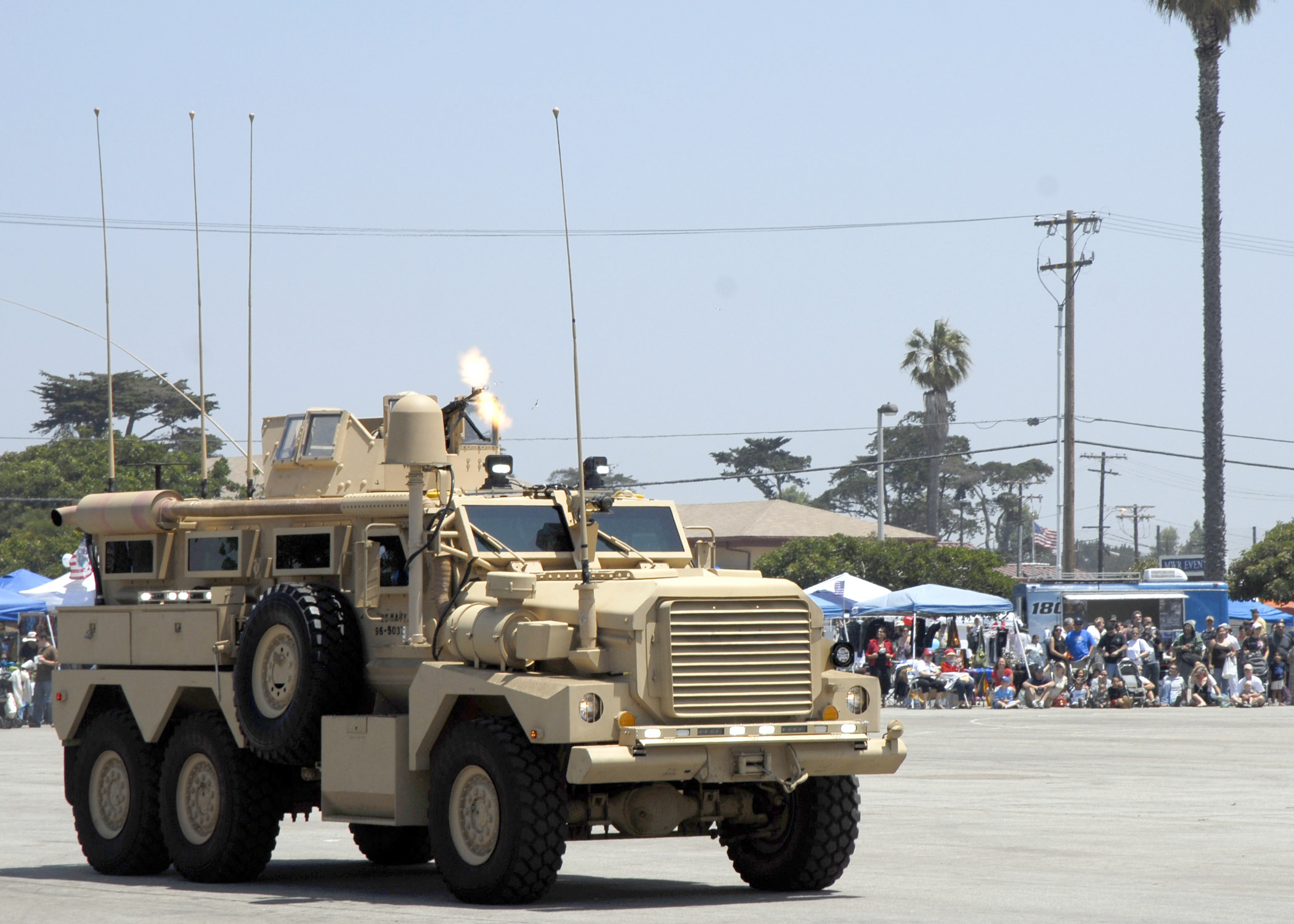
A Seabee convoy security team performs a firepower demonstration at Naval Base Ventura County

Naval Base Ventura County was established on October 11, 2000, during a ceremony held at Point Mugu. The two commands of NAS Point Mugu and CBC Port Hueneme were consolidated into a completely new organization. San Nicolas Island was transferred to NBVC on October 1, 2004, after several years under the Naval Air Warfare Center, Weapons Division.

NBVC provides the Pacific Fleet with an all-in-one mobilization site, deep water port, railhead, and airfield. NBVC hosts more than 100 tenant commands and, as of 2006, is the largest employer in Ventura County, with over 19,000 military and civilian personnel working for or stationed on the base. The base contributes directly or indirectly to another 8200 jobs throughout the county.

In February 2013, the U.S. Navy proposed to base four MQ-4C Tritons beginning in 2020; this would require 700 personnel and dependents to move to the base, and $74.3 million in estimated construction cost.

In May 2018, an investigation found that mismanagement had resulted in more than $32 million worth of equipment being unaccounted for because warehouse employees had failed to keep proper inventory records. Some classified materials in the warehouses had been stored improperly also. The warehouses hold supplies and repair equipment for destroyers, frigates and cruisers that carry classified weapons systems.

==== US Coast Guard tenant command ====
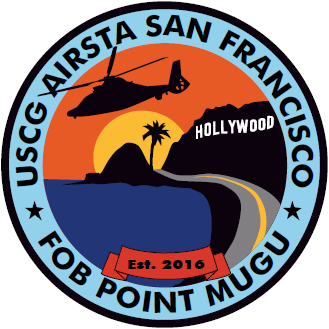
Insignia of the former USCG Air Station FOB Point Mugu

In September 2016, the Coast Guard Air Station in Los Angeles was closed and its assets transferred to Naval Base Ventura County from its former location at Los Angeles International Airport (LAX) when the lease on the existing facility ended. Administratively, it initially became a subunit of the Coast Guard Air Station in San Francisco, as a satellite facility called Forward Operating Base Point Mugu. This relocation allowed LAX to accommodate improvements for LAX's midfield, including the Midfield Satellite Concourse North (MSC North) terminal.

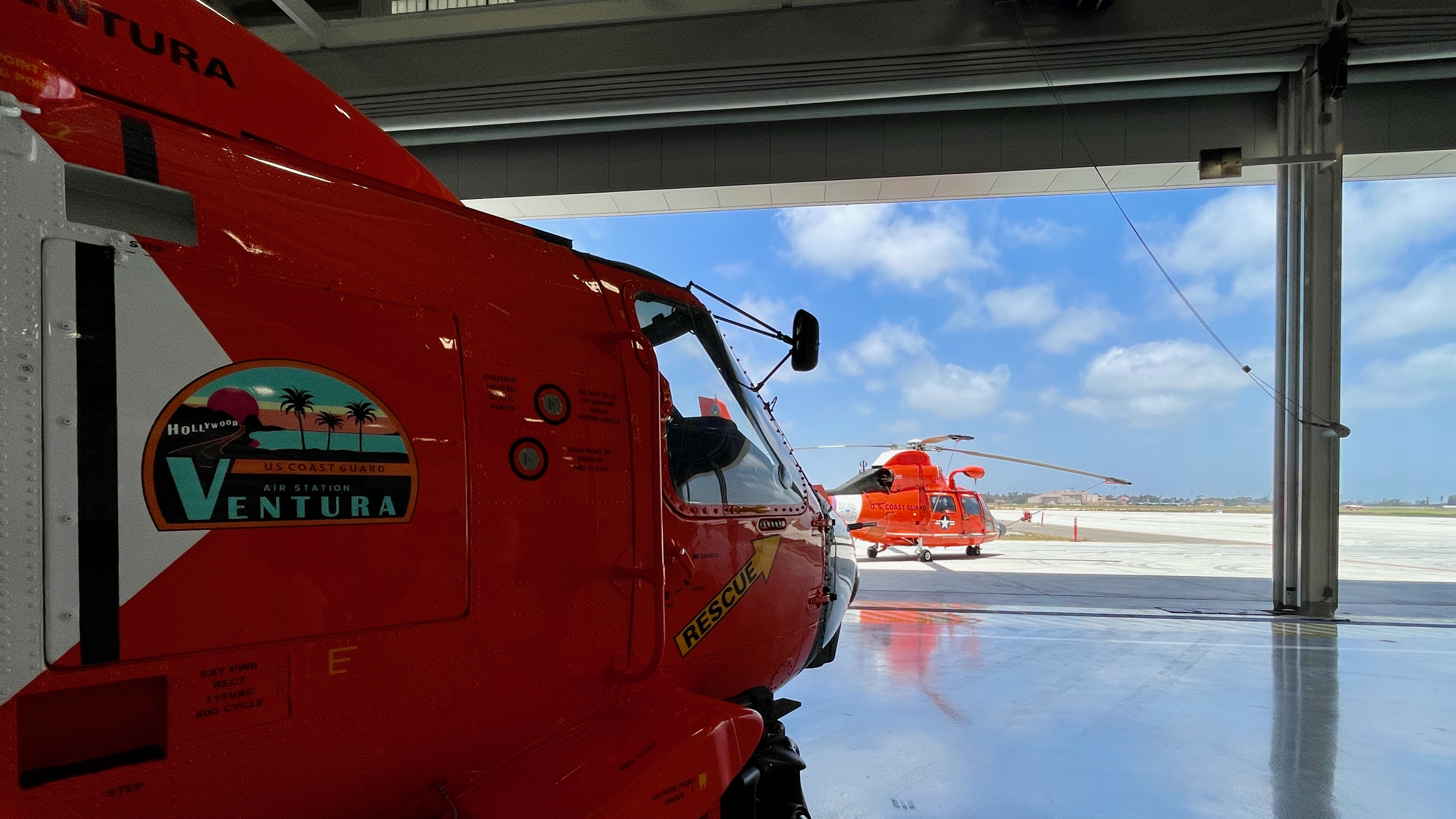
An MH-60T Jayhawk of Air Station Ventura with new station insignia

On 27 July 2021, the Coast Guard broke ground on the construction of a new facility to "transition the site from its current, semi-permanent Forward Operating Base Point Mugu to the full-service air station". Vice Admiral Michael F. McAllister, then commander of USCG Pacific Area stated, “We’re excited to break ground to re-establish a permanent air station. The new air station in Ventura will enhance critical mission capabilities, allowing us to better serve this critical area.” McAllister also said that CGAS Ventura would be the first air station stood up by the Coast Guard in more than 25 years.

Completed at a cost of $70 million with a 43,000 square foot hangar and a 12,000 square foot administration facility, the new Air Station Ventura quietly began operations in spring 2024 with Commander Amanda Sardone as its first CO. The hangar facility features four bays, shops, and storage for an all MH-60T helicopter squadron, as the USCG phases out its MH-65 Dolphin fleet. An untimely off-duty casualty of a member of the station crew resulted in the postponement of the official opening ceremony in recognition of their fallen brother. The commissioning ceremony was held on 13 November 2024.

== Facilities ==
Facilities of Naval Base Ventura County

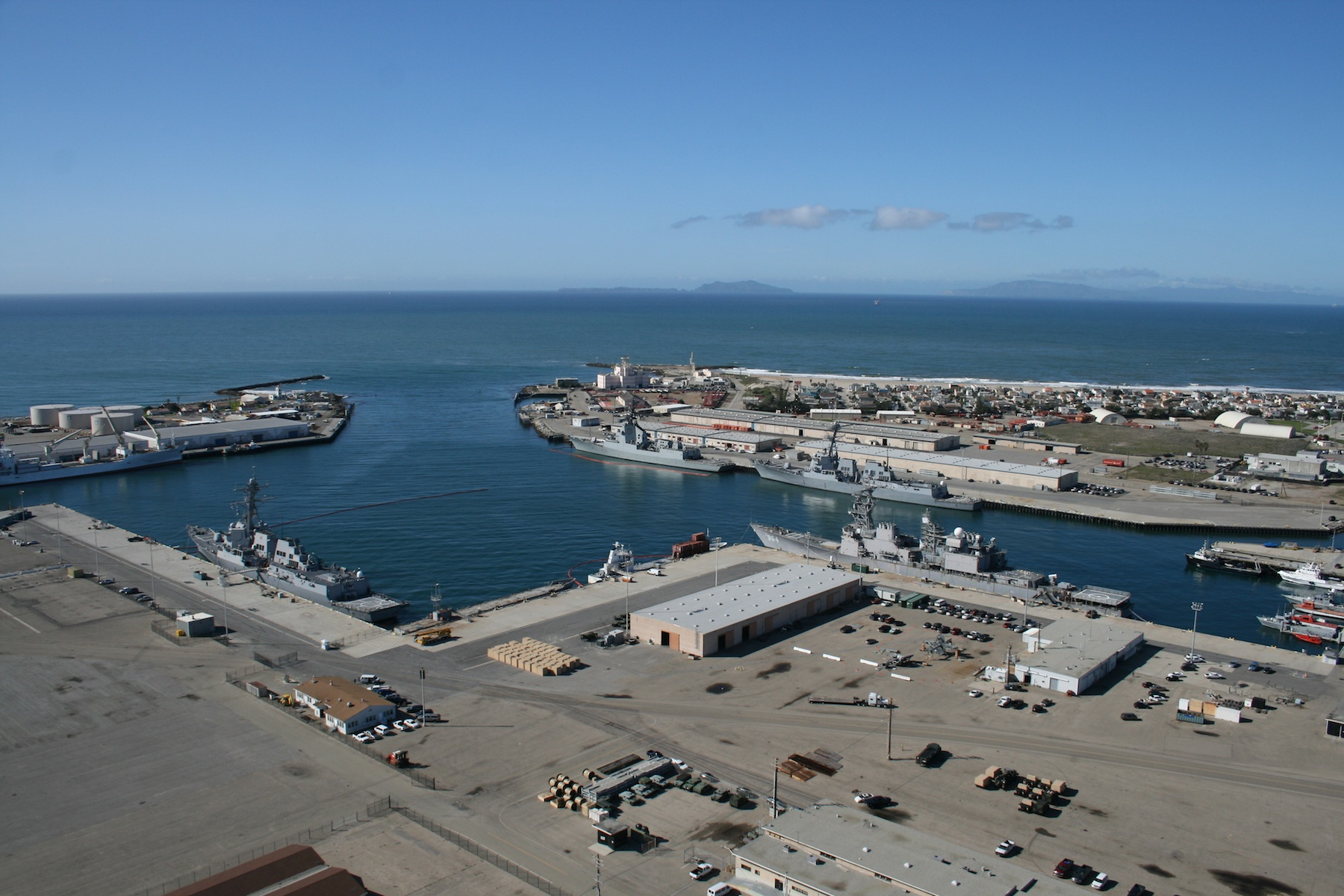
Port of Hueneme (pronounced "Why-nee-mee") is the only deep-water port between Los Angeles and San Francisco.

At Point Mugu, NBVC operates two runways and a 36,000-square-mile (93,000 km^{2}) sea test range, anchored by San Nicolas Island. The range allows the military to test and track weapons systems in restricted air- and sea-space without encroaching on civilian air traffic or shipping lanes. The range can be expanded through interagency coordination between the U.S. Navy and the Federal Aviation Administration. Telemetry data can be tracked and recorded using technology housed at San Nicolas Island, Point Mugu and Laguna Peak, a Tier 1 facility also controlled by NBVC. Additionally, the air traffic control facility contains a TRACON that provides terminal radar services for nearby busy Class D airports Camarillo Airport and Oxnard Airport.

At Port of Hueneme (pronounced "Why-nee-mee"), NBVC operates the only deep-water port between Los Angeles and San Francisco. The port also boasts 16 miles (26 km) of rail with dedicated access for on- and off-loading military freight for the various branches of service. The port is the west coast homeport of the U.S. Navy Seabees and supports the training and mobilization requirements for more than 2,600 active-duty personnel. The port facility is located on the vast agricultural Oxnard Plain, about 60 miles (97 km) northwest of Los Angeles, on the Southern California coast.

At San Nicolas Island (SNI), NBVC operates Naval Outlying Landing Field San Nicolas Island, which has a 10,002-foot (3,049 m) concrete and asphalt runway capable of accommodating aircraft the size of a C-5 Galaxy. Other facilities on the island include radar tracking instrumentation, electro optical devices, telemetry, communications equipment, missile and target launch areas, as well as personnel support. SNI serves as a launch platform for short and medium missile testing and as an observation facility for missile testing.

== Tenant commands ==
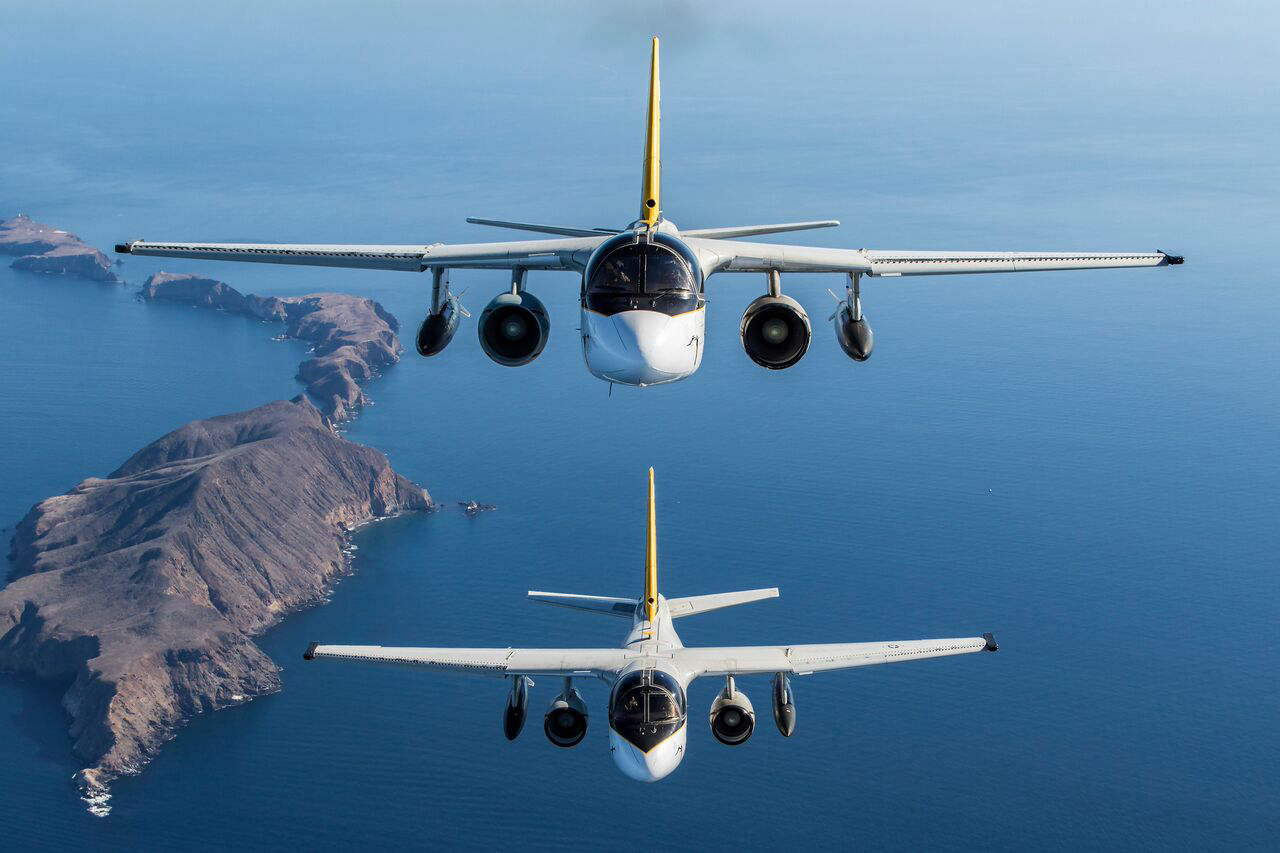
Two VX-30 S-3Bs over Anacapa Island in 2016

Tenant commands encompass a set of specialties that support both the fleet and fighter, including U.S Space Force's 10th Space Operations Squadron (formerly the Naval Satellite Operations Center (NAVSOC)), responsible for controlling and maintaining the Mobile User Objective System and Ultra-High Frequency Follow-On satellite constellations; and three warfare centers: Naval Air Warfare Center Weapons Division, Naval Surface Warfare Center Port Hueneme Division, and Naval Facilities Engineering and Expeditionary Warfare Center. NBVC is also home to deployable units, including the Pacific Seabees and the west coast E-2C, D Hawkeyes. The facility also shares runways with the California Air National Guard's 146th Airlift Wing at the Channel Islands Air National Guard Station. NBVC is also responsible for maintaining a training area used by Naval Construction Group ONE at Fort Hunter Liggett, located approximately 240 miles (390 km) north of NBVC's main facilities. MQ-25A Stingray drones will be based at Point Mugu under the Airborne Command and Control Logistics Wing.

=== Point Mugu tenants ===
- 146th Airlift Wing, California Air National Guard
- Commander, Airborne Command Control and Logistics Wing
  - Airborne Command & Control Squadron 113
  - Airborne Command & Control Squadron 115
  - Airborne Command & Control Squadron 116
  - Airborne Command & Control Squadron 117
- Fleet Readiness Center South West - Site Mugu
- NAVAIR Weapons Division
- Naval Operational Support Center
- Naval Computer & Telecommunications Station San Diego - Ventura County Site
- 10th Space Operations Squadron
- Naval Test Wing Pacific
  - Air Test and Evaluation Squadron 30
- Fleet Logistics Support Squadron 55
- Coast Guard Air Station Ventura

=== Port Hueneme tenants ===
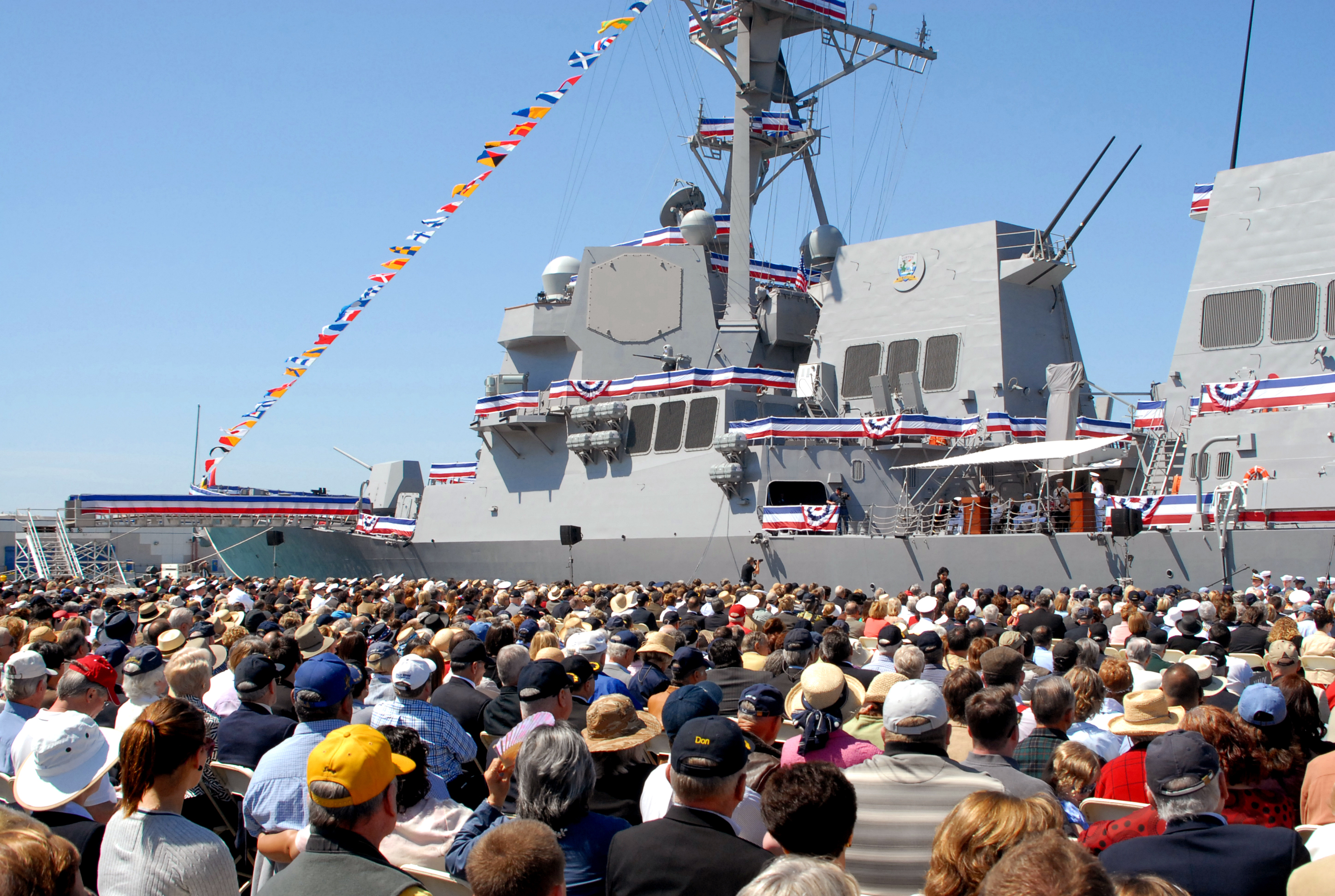
The guided-missile destroyer USS Stockdale is commissioned at Naval Base Ventura County

- Antarctic Logistics Support Operations, formerly a Naval operation, now run by civilian contractors to the National Science Foundation's Division of Polar Programs
- Center for Seabees & Facilities Engineering
  - Naval Construction Training Center
  - Naval Civil Engineer Corps Officers School
- Defense Contract Management Agency
- Detachment 1, 344th Air Force Training Squadron, United States Air Force
- Defense Logistics Agency, Document Services
- Engineering Duty Officer School
- Mobile Utilities Support Equipment
- Naval Facilities Acquisition Center for Training
- Naval Facilities Expeditionary Warfare Center
- Naval Surface Warfare Center Port Hueneme Division
- Navy Cargo Handling Battalion 14
- U.S. Naval Construction Force
  - Naval Mobile Construction Battalion Three
  - Naval Mobile Construction Battalion Four
  - Naval Mobile Construction Battalion Five
  - Underwater Construction Team 2
  - 1st Naval Construction Regiment
  - Naval Construction Group ONE

== U.S. Navy Seabee Museum ==
Located on Naval Base Ventura County is the U.S. Navy Seabee Museum, one of 10 official U.S. Navy museums. The museum is the principal repository for the Seabees’ operational history. The Seabee Archive contains various operational records, battalion histories, manuscripts, oral histories, biographies, and personal papers pertaining to the Seabees.

== Accidents and incidents ==
- On 20 April 2002, a US Navy McDonnell Douglas F-4 Phantom II (USN BuNo 155749) crashed at the Point Mugu airshow. The cause of the accident was cited as pilot error.
- On 18 May 2011, a Boeing 707 belonging to Omega Aerial Refueling Services and chartered to the U.S. Navy skidded off the runway and burst into flames shortly after landing. A reported amount of approximately 150,000 pounds of jet fuel was on board when the plane crashed. All three personnel aboard the aircraft survived with non life-threatening injuries.
- On 7 November 2015, a rocket launched from Point Mugu caused a momentary "frenzy" of confusion amongst south Californian locals. Another source says the Trident II (D5) test missile was launched from a submarine.

== See also ==
- List of United States Navy airfields
