= Humana Press =

American academic publisher

- Founded: 1976
- Founder: Thomas L. Lanigan and Julia Lanigan
- Defunct: 2006
- Successor: Springer Science+Business Media
- Country of origin: United States
- Headquarters location: Totowa, New Jersey
- Publication types: Books and journals
- Nonfiction topics: Science, technology, and medical
- Official website: www.springer.com/humana

Humana Press was an American academic publisher of science, technology, and medical books and journals founded in 1976. It was bought by Springer Science+Business Media in 2006.

== History ==
The company was founded in 1976 in Clifton, New Jersey, by Thomas L. Lanigan and his wife, Julia Lanigan, both chemists, and published its first book in 1977. The company was acquired by Springer Science+Business Media in the fall of 2006 and continues to publish titles of book series under the Humana Press imprint.

In January 2008, Springer stated that Humana Press had a backlist of approximately 1,500 titles in clinical medicine and life sciences, and that about 150 titles were added each year.

== Selected publications ==
=== Book series ===
- Cancer Drug, Discovery, and Development
- Contemporary Cardiology
- Contemporary Endocrinology
- Current Clinical Oncology
- Current Clinical Pathology
- Current Clinical Practice
- Methods in Molecular Biology
- Methods in Molecular Medicine
- Neuromethods

=== Journals ===
- Journal of Molecular Neuroscience
- Neuroinformatics
- Stem Cell Reviews and Reports
- Clinical Proteomics
- High Temperature and Materials Science
