= Peter L. Hammer =

American mathematician (1936–2006)

- Born: December 23, 1936; Timișoara, Kingdom of Romania
- Died: December 27, 2006 (aged 70); Princeton, New Jersey
- Known for: Operations Research and Applied Discrete Mathematics
- Awards: "Gheorghe Țițeica" prize of the Romanian Academy of Science (1966), Euler Medal of the Institute of Combinatorics and its Applications (1999)
- Scientific career
- Fields: Applied Mathematics
- Doctoral advisor: Grigore Moisil

Peter Ladislaw Hammer (December 23, 1936, Timișoara – December 27, 2006, Princeton, New Jersey) was an American mathematician native to Romania. He contributed to the fields of operations research and applied discrete mathematics through the study of pseudo-Boolean functions and their connections to graph theory and data mining.

== Biography ==
Hammer was born in Timișoara, Romania, into a Hungarian speaking Jewish family. He did both his undergraduate and graduate studies at the University of Bucharest, earning a diploma in 1958 and a doctorate in 1965 under the supervision of Grigore Moisil. For a while in the 1960s he published under the name of Petru L. Ivănescu. In 1967, he and his wife (Anca Ivănescu) escaped Romania and defected to Israel. Hammer taught at the Technion from 1967 to 1969, then moved to Canada at McGill University in Montreal from 1969 to 1972, at the University of Waterloo from 1972 to 1983, and finally at Rutgers University in New Brunswick, New Jersey for the remainder of his career. He was killed in a car accident on December 27, 2006.

Hammer founded the Rutgers University Center for Operations Research, and created and edited the journals Discrete Mathematics, Discrete Applied Mathematics, Discrete Optimization, Annals of Discrete Mathematics, Annals of Operations Research, and SIAM Monographs on Discrete Mathematics and Applications.

== Publications ==
Hammer's publications include 19 books and over 240 papers. They include:

- Ivănescu, Peter L.; Rudeanu, Sergiu (1968). Boolean methods in operations research and related areas. Econometrics and Operations Research. Vol. VII. With a preface by Richard E. Bellman. New York: Springer-Verlag. MR 0235830.
- 2008. Boolean Functions in Computer Science and Engineering (with Y. Crama). Cambridge University Press. 2008.
- 2009. Boolean Functions in Pure and Applied Mathematics (with Y. Crama). Cambridge University Press, 2009.
- 2010. PseudoBoolean Functions (with E. Boros and Y. Crama). Cambridge University Press, 2010.
- Crama, Yves; Hammer, Peter L. (2011). Boolean functions: Theory, algorithms, and applications. Encyclopedia of Mathematics and its Applications. Vol. 142. Cambridge: Cambridge University Press. doi:10.1017/cbo9780511852008. ISBN 978-0-511-85200-8. MR 2742439.

== Awards and honors ==
In 1966, as a recent doctorate, Hammer won the "Gheorghe Țițeica" prize of the Romanian Academy of Science. He became a fellow of the American Association for the Advancement of Science in 1974. In 1986 he was awarded his first honorary doctorate, from the École Polytechnique Fédérale de Lausanne; subsequently, he was awarded two more, by the University of Rome La Sapienza in 1998 and the University of Liège in 1999. He also won the Euler Medal of the Institute of Combinatorics and its Applications in 1999, and was a founding fellow of the institute.

== See also ==
- List of University of Waterloo people
