= Springer Science+Business Media =

Global publishing company

- Founded: 10 May 1842; 184 years ago (as Springer-Verlag)
- Founder: Julius Springer
- Country of origin: Germany
- Headquarters location: Berlin/Heidelberg, Germany
- Nonfiction topics: Science, technology, medicine, business, transport and architecture
- Owner: Springer Nature
- Official website: springer.com

Springer Science+Business Media, commonly known as Springer, is a German multinational publishing company of books, e-books and peer-reviewed journals in science, humanities, technical and medical (STM) publishing. It is owned by Springer Nature.

Originally founded in 1842 in Berlin, it expanded internationally in the 1960s, and through mergers in the 1990s and a sale to venture capitalists it fused with Wolters Kluwer and eventually became part of Springer Nature in 2015. Springer has major offices in Berlin, Heidelberg, Dordrecht, and New York City.

== History ==
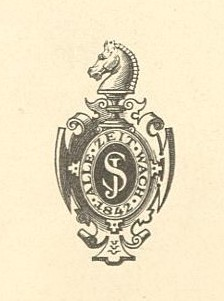
Springer signet, 1888

Julius Springer founded Springer-Verlag in Berlin in 1842 and his son Ferdinand Springer grew it from a small firm of four employees into Germany's second-largest academic publisher at the time, with 65 staff members in 1872. The company's canting logo is a chess knight; Springer (literally "jumper") is the word for the piece in German. In 1964, Springer expanded its business internationally, opening an office in New York City. Offices in Tokyo, Paris, Milan, Hong Kong, and Delhi soon followed.

In 1999, the academic publishing company BertelsmannSpringer was formed after the media and entertainment company Bertelsmann bought a majority stake in Springer-Verlag. In 2003, the British investment groups Cinven and Candover bought BertelsmannSpringer from Bertelsmann. They merged the company in 2004 with the Dutch publisher Kluwer Academic Publishers (successor of D. Reidel, Dr. W. Junk, Plenum Publishers, most of Chapman & Hall, and Baltzer Science Publishers) which they bought from Wolters Kluwer in 2002, to form Springer Science+Business Media.

In 2006, Springer acquired Humana Press.

Springer acquired the open-access publisher BioMed Central in October 2008 for an undisclosed amount.

In 2009, Cinven and Candover sold Springer to two private equity firms, EQT AB and Government of Singapore Investment Corporation, confirmed in February 2010 after the competition authorities in the US and in Europe approved the transfer.

In 2011, Springer acquired Pharma Marketing and Publishing Services (MPS) from Wolters Kluwer.

In 2013, the London-based private equity firm BC Partners acquired a majority stake in Springer from EQT and GIC for $4.4 billion.

In January 2015, Holtzbrinck Publishing Group / Nature Publishing Group and Springer Science+Business Media announced a merger. In May 2015 they concluded the transaction and formed a new joint venture company, Springer Nature with Holtzbrinck in the majority 53% share and BC Partners retaining 47% interest in the company.

== Products ==
In 1996, Springer launched electronic book and journal content on its SpringerLink site.

SpringerImages was launched in 2008. In 2009, SpringerMaterials, a platform for accessing the Landolt-Börnstein database of research and information on materials and their properties, was launched.

AuthorMapper is a free online tool for visualizing scientific research that enables document discovery based on author locations and geographic maps, helping users explore patterns in scientific research, identify literature trends, discover collaborative relationships, and locate experts in several scientific/medical fields.

Springer Protocols contained a collection of laboratory protocols, recipes that provide step-by-step instructions for conducting experiments, which in 2018 was made available in SpringerLink instead.

Book publications include major reference works, textbooks, monographs and book series; more than 168,000 titles are available as e-books in 24 subject collections.

=== Open access ===
Springer is a member of the Open Access Scholarly Publishers Association. For some of its journals, Springer does not require its authors to transfer their copyrights, and allows them to decide whether their articles are published under an open-access license or in the traditional restricted licence model. While open-access publishing typically requires the author to pay a fee for copyright retention, this fee is sometimes covered by a third party. For example, a national institution in Poland allows authors to publish in open-access journals without incurring any personal cost but using public funds.

== Controversies ==
In 1938, Springer-Verlag was pressed to apply Nazi principles on the journal Zentralblatt MATH. Tullio Levi-Civita, who was Jewish, was forced out from the editorial board, and Otto Neugebauer resigned in protest along with most of the rest of the board.

In 2014, it was revealed that 16 papers in conference proceedings published by Springer had been computer-generated using SCIgen. Springer subsequently retracted all papers from these proceedings. IEEE had removed more than 100 fake papers from its conference proceedings.

In 2015, Springer retracted 64 papers from 10 of its journals it had published after a fraudulent peer review process was uncovered.

=== Manipulation of bibliometrics ===
According to Goodhart's law and concerned academics like the signatories of the San Francisco Declaration on Research Assessment, commercial academic publishers benefit from manipulation of bibliometrics and scientometrics like the journal impact factor, which is often used as a proxy of prestige and can influence revenues, including public subsidies in the form of subscriptions and free work from academics.

Seven Springer Nature journals, which exhibited unusual levels of self-citation, had their journal impact factor of 2019 suspended from Journal Citation Reports in 2020, a sanction which hit 34 journals in total.

== Selected imprints ==
- Adis International
- Apress
- BioMed Central
  - Chemistry Central (defunct)
  - PhysMath Central (defunct)
- Birkhäuser Verlag
- Current Medicine Group
- Humana Press
- Infochem
- Kluwer Academic Publishers (defunct)
  - Baltzer Science Publishers
  - D. Reidel
- Plenum Publishers
- SpringerOpen
- Springer Gabler
- Springer Praxis Books
- Springer Spektrum (formerly Spektrum Akademischer Verlag (SAV))
- Springer Vieweg
- Springer VS

== Selected publications ==
- Cellular Oncology
- Encyclopaedia of Mathematics
- Ergebnisse der Mathematik und ihrer Grenzgebiete (book series)
- Graduate Texts in Mathematics (book series)
- Grothendieck's Séminaire de géométrie algébrique
- The International Journal of Advanced Manufacturing Technology
- Lecture Notes in Computer Science
- Undergraduate Texts in Mathematics (book series)
- Zentralblatt MATH
- MRS Bulletin

== See also ==
- Category:Springer Science+Business Media academic journals
- List of publishers
- Media concentration
