= Teague (surname) =

Teague is a surname, and may refer to:

- Addison Teague, American sound editor
- Alice Teague-Neeld (born 1996), Australian netball player
- Andrew Teague (born 1986), English footballer
- Anna Teague (born 1987), Australian rules footballer
- Anthony 'Scooter' Teague (1940–1989), American actor and dancer
- Baden Teague (born 1944), Australian politician
- Barry Teague (born 1946), Australian rules footballer
- Bernard Teague, Australian judge
- Bertha Teague (1906–1991), American basketball coach
- Bob Teague (1929–2013), American television news reporter
- Brad Teague (born 1947), American NASCAR driver
- Bruce Teague (born 1976), American entrepreneur and mayor of Iowa City
- Charles M. Teague (1909–1974), American politician
- Charlie Teague (1921–1996), American baseball player
- Colin Teague (born 1970), British film and television director
- Colin Teague (missionary) (c. 1780–1839), American missionary in Africa
- Cynthia Teague (1907–2007), Australian architect
- David Teague (footballer) (born 1981), Australian rules footballer and coach
- David Teague (basketball) (born 1983), American basketball player
- Dick Teague (1923–1991), American industrial designer
- Donald Teague (1897–1991), American magazine illustrator and watercolorist
- Eddie Teague (1921–1987), American football coach and college athletics administrator
- Edward B. Teague III (born 1949), American politician from Massachusetts
- Edwin Teague (1934–2023), American sports shooter
- Elmer W. Teague (1923–2016), American politician
- E. B. Teague (1820–1902), American Baptist minister
- Frances Teague, American actress
- Fred Teague (born 2006), British trampoline gymnast
- Gene Teague (born 1989), American basketball player
- George Teague (born 1971), American football player
- Guy Teague (1913–1970), American actor and stuntman
- Harry Teague (born 1949), American politician
- Hilary Teague (1802–1853), Liberian merchant, journalist and politician
- Jason Cranford Teague, author of computing books
- Jeff Teague (born 1988), American basketball player
- Jeff Teague (automotive designer) (1956–2016), American automotive designer
- Jeffrey Teague (music producer), American music producer, publisher and musician
- Jennifer Teague (1987–2005), Canadian murder victim, Murder of Jennifer Teague
- Johanna Teague (born 1973), Swedish diplomat
- John Teague (1833–1902), Canadian architect and politician
- John Teague (American politician) (1944–2023), American politician from Alabama
- Josh Teague (born 1975), Australian politician
- Kerry Teague (1961–2021), American stock car racing driver
- Larry Teague, American politician from Arkansas
- Lettie Teague, American author and wine columnist
- Lewis Teague (born 1938), American film director
- Lewis Teague (painter) (1917–1978), architect and painter
- Liam Teague (born 1974), Trinidadian composer, arranger and steelpan performer
- MaCio Teague (born 1997), American basketball player
- Mark Teague (born 1963), American author and illustrator
- Marquis Teague (born 1993), American basketball player
- Marshall Teague (racing driver) (1922–1959), American race car driver
- Marshall Teague (actor) (born 1953), American actor
- Mason Teague (born 2003), Australian rugby league footballer
- Master Teague (born 2000), American football player
- Matthew Teague (born 1958), American football player
- Mike Teague (born 1960), English rugby union footballer
- Montrell Teague (born 1991), American harness racing driver
- Norman Teague (born 1968), American designer, artist and educator
- Norwood Teague, athletic director at the University of Minnesota
- Olin E. Teague (1910–1981), American politician
- Owen Teague, American actor
- Reginald Teague-Jones (1889–1988), British intelligence officer
- Roger Teague, United States Air Force major general
- Ryan Teague (born 2002), Australian soccer player
- Sean Michael Teague (born 1970), American voice actor and scriptwriter
- Sharon Beasley-Teague (born 1952), American politician
- Tess Teague (born 1990), American politician
- Thurman Teague (1909–1987), American jazz double-bassist
- Trey Teague (born 1974), American football player
- Vanessa Teague, Australian cryptographer
- Violet Teague (1872–1951), Australian artist
- Walter Dorwin Teague (1883–1960), American Art Deco designer

== See also ==
- Teagues
