= Fall on Me =

Fall on Me may refer to:

- "Fall on Me" (R.E.M. song)
- "Fall on Me" (Andrea Bocelli and Matteo Bocelli song), covered by A Great Big World and Christina Aguilera
- "Fall on Me", 2016 song by Kitten
- "Fall on Me", 1977 song from Amnesia by Pousette-Dart Band
- "Falls on Me" (Fuel song)
