= Jason Teague =

Jason Teague may refer to:

- Jason Teague (Smallville), a character on the TV series Smallville
- Jason Cranford Teague, author of DHTML and CSS for the World Wide Web
