= Jeff Teague (disambiguation) =

Jeff Teague (born 1988) is an American former basketball player and regional scout for the Atlanta Hawks.

Jeff Teague may refer to:

- Jeff Teague (automotive designer) (1956–2016), American automotive designer
- Jeffrey Teague (music producer), American music producer
