= Teague =

Teague may refer to:

== People ==
=== Given name ===
- Teague Moore (born 1976), American wrestler and coach
- Teague Rook, Australian actor

=== Surname ===
- Teague (surname)

== Places ==
- Teague, Texas, a city in Freestone County, Texas, United States
  - Teague Independent School District, a public school district based in Teague, Texas
- Teague Middle School, Altamonte Springs, Florida

== Characters ==
- Big Dan Teague, a character from the 2000 film O Brother, Where Art Thou?
- Edward Teague, a character from the Pirates of the Caribbean film series
- Joe Teague, the main character from the television show Mob City
- Detective Teague Dixon, a recurring character in True Detective season 2 played by W. Earl Brown

== Other uses ==
- Teague (company), an American industrial design firm
- Teague or taig, an archaic given name used as a slur for an Irishman
- 27412 Teague, a minor planet
- Teague v. Lane, 489 U.S. 288 (1989), a United States Supreme Court case that created the "Teague Test" in Habeas corpus cases
- Teague crater, former name of Shoemaker crater, an impact structure in Western Australia
- Teague Creek, a tributary of the James River in Webster County, Missouri, United States

== See also ==
- Teagues (disambiguation)
