= 4th Space Operations Squadron =

US Space Force satellite squadron

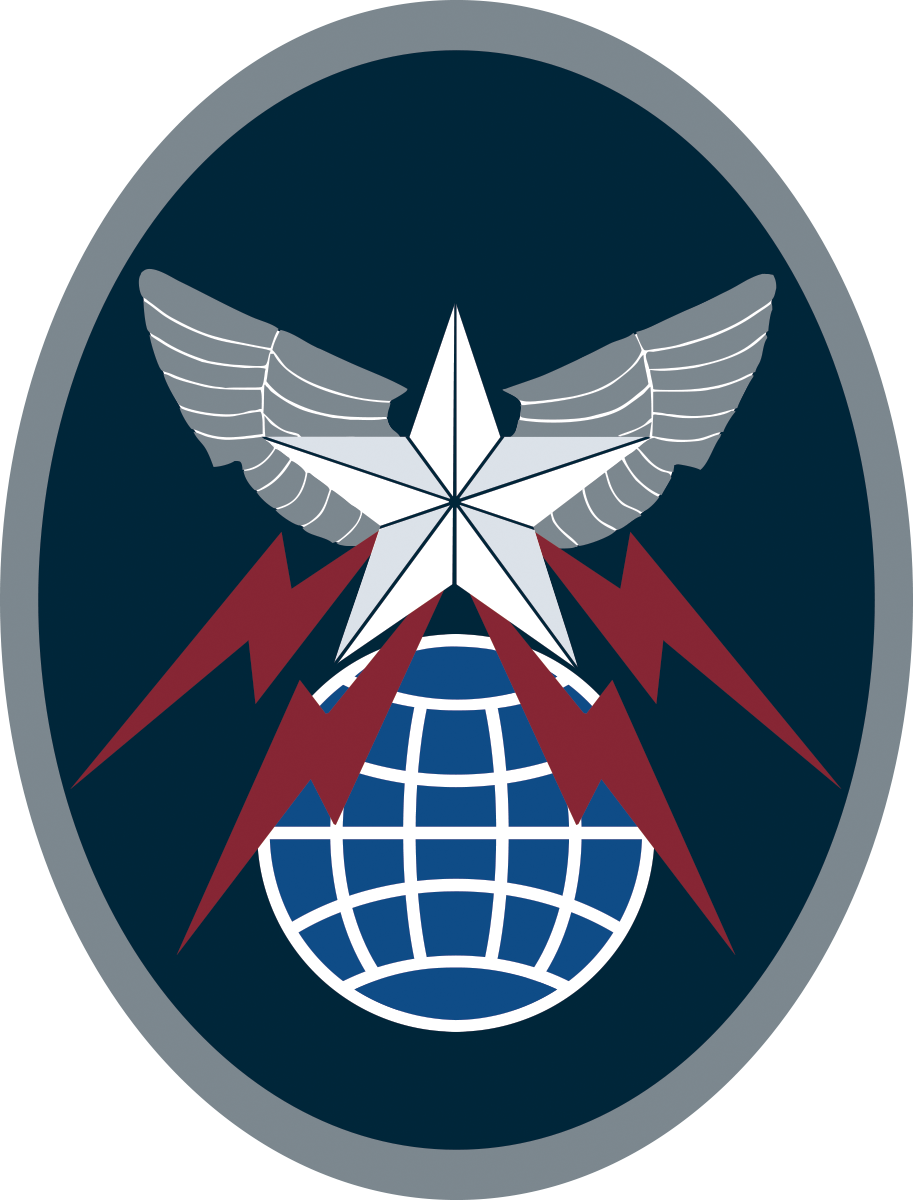
- Squadron emblem
- Active: 1941–1946; 1947–1949; 1952–1958; 1992–present
- Country: United States
- Branch: United States Space Force
- Role: Satellite Operations
- Part of: Space Delta 8
- Garrison/HQ: Schriever Space Force Base, Colorado
- Motto: Linking the Forces (since 1994)
- Engagements: American Theater Southwest Pacific Theater (Air & China Offensive) Global war on terrorism

- Decorations: Air Force Outstanding Unit Award Philippine Presidential Unit Citation

Commanders
- Current commander: Lt Col Jeremy D. Haines
- Notable commanders: John E. Shaw

Insignia
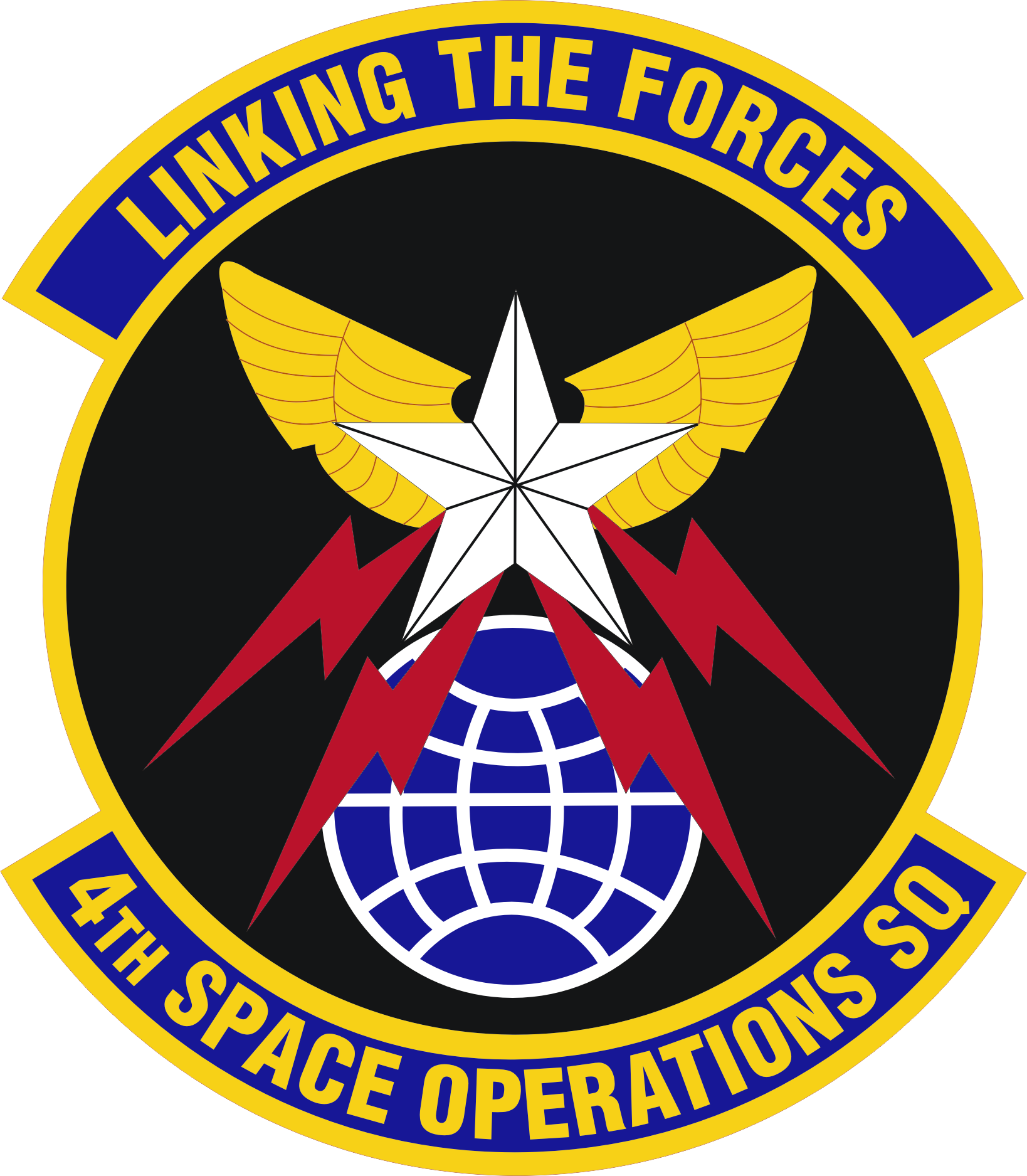
- 4th Space Operations Squadron (in use until transfer to the Space Force)

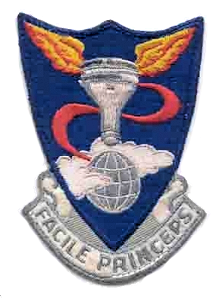
- 4th Strategic Reconnaissance Squadron emblem (approved 20 January 1956)

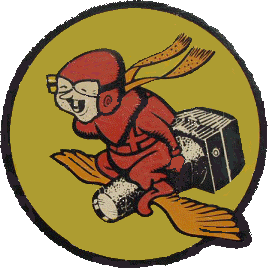
- 4th Photographic Mapping Squadron emblem (approved 14 July 1943)

The United States Space Force's 4th Space Operations Squadron (4 SOPS) is a satellite operations unit located at Schriever Space Force Base, Colorado. 4 SOPS is part of Space Delta 8 and responsible for command and control of the Milstar/Advanced Extremely High Frequency, Defense Satellite Communications System Phase III, and Wideband Global SATCOM satellite constellations. The 4th Space Operations Squadron's mission is to operate the Space Force's protected and wideband MILSATCOM systems. They provide warfighters global, secure, survivable, strategic and tactical communication during peacetime and throughout the full spectrum of conflict. The squadron also operates three mobile constellation control stations at various locations in conjunction with host partners. At higher readiness levels and during exercises, these personnel deploy with U.S. Strategic Command and U.S. Northern Command respectively.

Additionally, they provide reliable space-borne communications to national authorities, U.S. and Allied forces. The 4 SOPS' motto "Linking the Forces" reflects the squadron's responsibility to enhance the nation's secure and wideband communications capability for today's military forces. Command and control of satellites is provided through dedicated Extremely High Frequency antennas and the Satellite Control Network.

The multi-satellite constellation links command authorities to high-priority U.S. forces via communications terminals on aircraft, ships, submarines, trucks, and ground sites with encrypted voice, data, teletype, or facsimile communications. They also provide secure high-rate data communications links to the President, Secretary of Defense, theater commanders and strategic and tactical forces worldwide.

== History ==
=== World War II ===
Established under the 1st Photographic Group in May 1941. Performed aerial mapping primarily over the southwestern United States prior to the Pearl Harbor Attack using Beechcraft F-2 Expeditor variants of the Beechcraft Model 18 which were equipped for the reconnaissance role.

After the United States entry into World War II, flew aerial mapping missions over Western Canada and Alaska, mapping uncharted territory to support the building of the Alaska Highway. Deployed to South America in 1942–1943; mapping locations in British Guiana and Brazil for locations of emergency airfields as part of the development of the South Atlantic Transport Route.

Attached to 13th Air Force in late 1944; engaged in long-range mapping and reconnaissance over combat areas in support of seaborne landings in the Southwest Pacific Area and the liberation of the Philippines. Remained in the Pacific Theater after V-J Day performing reconnaissance mapping flights over Japan, Korea, and China. Unit largely demobilized on Okinawa. Inactivated in early 1946.

=== Air Force reserve ===
Active from 1947 to 1949 at Niagara Falls Municipal Airport as a reserve unit. Apparently not fully staffed or equipped.

=== Strategic Air Command ===
Reactivated in 1952 as part of Strategic Air Command. Mission was to gather intelligence on a global scale. The squadron operated Boeing RB-47 Stratojet medium bombers refitted for aerial reconnaissance and mapping missions. Flew day and night strategic reconnaissance missions over a global scale. Inactivated due to budget reductions in 1958.

=== Space unit ===
Activated at Falcon Air Force Station, Colorado in 1992 as a space unit. Four SOPS transferred to the United States Space Force on July 24, 2020, and became part of Space Delta 8.

== Lineage ==
- Constituted as the 4th Photographic Squadron on 15 May 1941

Activated on 10 June 1941
Redesignated 4th Mapping Squadron on 13 January 1942
Redesignated 4th Photographic Mapping Squadron on 9 June 1942
Redesignated 4th Photographic Charting Squadron on 11 August 1943
Redesignated 4th Reconnaissance Squadron, Long Range, Photographic on 15 June 1945
Redesignated 4th Reconnaissance Squadron, Very Long Range, Photographic on 20 November 1945
Inactivated on 14 April 1946

- Redesignated 4th Reconnaissance Squadron, Photographic on 5 September 1947

Activated in the reserve on 20 September 1947
Inactivated on 27 June 1949

- Redesignated 4th Strategic Reconnaissance Squadron, Medium on 9 May 1952

Activated on 28 May 1952
Inactivated on 1 July 1958

- Redesignated 4th Space Operations Squadron on 1 April 1992

Activated on 30 April 1992

=== Assignments ===
- 1st Photographic Group (later 1st Mapping Group, 1st Photographic Charting Group), 10 June 1941
- 311th Photographic Wing (later 311th Reconnaissance Wing), 5 October 1944 – 14 April 1946

Attached to

Thirteenth Air Force, c. 7 November 1944
4th Photographic Group, December 1944
6th Reconnaissance Group, 3 May 1945
308th Bombardment Wing, 22 October 1945 – 14 April 1946

- First Air Force, 20 September 1947
- 26th Reconnaissance Group, 23 October 1947 – 27 June 1949
- 26th Strategic Reconnaissance Wing, 28 May 1952 – 1 July 1958
- 50th Operations Group, 30 April 1992 – 24 July 2020
- Space Delta 8, 24 July 2020 – present

=== Stations ===
- Moffett Field, California, 10 June 1941
- March Field, California, 10 December 1941

Detachments operated from various bases in Alaska, Canada, Central America, the Caribbean, and South America, between 1942 and 1944

- Peterson Field, Colorado, 4 January 1944
- Buckley Field, Colorado, 1 July – 14 October 1944
- Hollandia Airfield Complex, Netherlands East Indies, 7 November 1944

Detachments operated from:

Wama Airfield, Morotai, Netherlands East Indies, December 1944 – January 1945
Australia, January–May 1945
San Roque Airfield (Moret Field), Mindanao, Philippines, April–June 1945
Clark Field, Luzon, Philippines, June–August 1945

- Tacloban Airfield, Leyte, Philippines, 11 July 1945

Detachment operated from Okinawa, August–October 1945

- Seoul Airport, South Korea, 25 October 1945 – 14 April 1946
- Niagara Falls Municipal Airport, New York, 20 September 1947
- Buffalo Airport, New York, 3 May 1948 – 27 June 1949
- Lockbourne Air Force Base, Ohio, 28 May 1952 – 1 July 1958
- Falcon Air Force Base (later Schriever Space Force Base), Colorado, 30 April 1992 – present

=== Aircraft ===
- Beechcraft F-2 Expeditor, 1941–1942
- A-29 Hudson, 1942
- B-34 Lexington, 1943–1944
- B-24/F7 Liberator, 1943–1946
- Unknown, 1947–1949
- Boeing YRB-47 Stratojet, 1953–1958
- Boeing RB-47 Stratojet, 1953–1958
- Boeing B-47 Stratojet, 1953–1958
- Satellites, 1992–present

== List of commanders ==
- Lt Col Charles Thompson, March 1992 – June 1993
- Lt Col Kimber McKenzie, June 1993 – January 1995
- Lt Col Michael Mantz, January 1995 – August 1996
- Lt Col Philip Fitzjarrell, August 1996 – March 1999
- Lt Col Allan Kirkman, March 1999 – February 2001
- Lt Col Roger Teague, February 2001 – June 2003
- Lt Col Ronald L. Huntley, June 2003 – June 2005
- Lt Col John E. Shaw, June 2005 – June 2007
- Lt Col Tommy Roberts, June 2007 – June 2009
- Lt Col Douglas A. Schiess, 19 June 2009 – June 2011
- Lt Col Scott Trinrud, 24 June 2011 – June 2013
- Lt Col Monte Munoz, 19 June 2013 – July 2015
- Lt Col Sherman Johns, July 2015 – July 2017
- Lt Col Armon Lansing, 13 July 2017 – July 2019
- Lt Col Timothy Ryan, July 2019 – 17 June 2021
- Lt Col Brian Dea, 17 June 2021 – 20 July 2023
- Lt Col Michelle L. Haines, 20 July 2023 – 11 July 2025
- Lt Col Jeremy D. Haines, 11 July 2025 - Present
