= John E. Shaw =

U.S. Space Force general

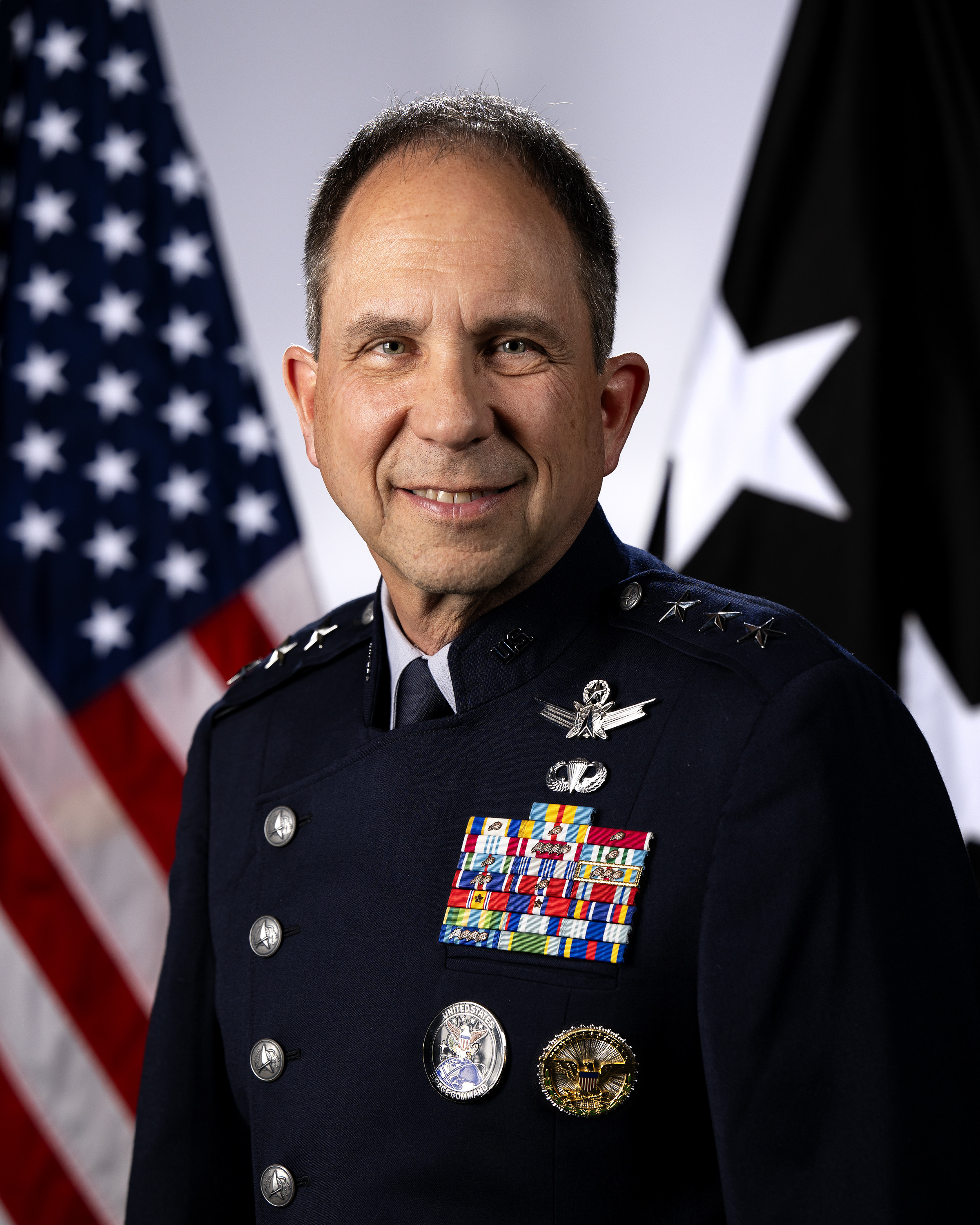
- Official portrait, 2023
- Born: March 17, 1968 (age 58); Norton, Massachusetts, U.S.
- Alma mater: United States Air Force Academy (BS): University of Washington (MS); George Washington University (MA)
- Spouse: Tonia Shaw
- Military career
- Allegiance: United States
- Branch: United States Air Force: United States Space Force
- Service years: 1990–2020 (Air Force): 2020–2023 (Space Force)
- Rank: Lieutenant General
- Commands: Combined Force Space Component Command: Space Operations Command; Fourteenth Air Force; 21st Space Wing; 50th Operations Group; 4th Space Operations Squadron
- Awards: Defense Distinguished Service Medal: Air Force Distinguished Service Medal (2); Defense Superior Service Medal (2); Legion of Merit (2)

John Edwin Shaw (born March 17, 1968) is a retired United States Space Force lieutenant general who last served as the deputy commander of the United States Space Command from 2020 to 2023. He previously served as commander of the Combined Force Space Component Command and deputy commander of Space Operations Command.

Shaw is from Norton, Massachusetts. He entered the United States Air Force in 1990 after graduating from the United States Air Force Academy. A career space operations officer, he served in various operations and staff positions in the Air Force, including commanding the Fourteenth Air Force, 21st Space Wing, 50th Operations Group, and 4th Space Operations Squadron. He transferred to the Space Force in 2020 he was promoted to lieutenant general and became the second deputy commander of the United States Space Command.

Shaw has received graduate degrees from the University of Washington and George Washington University. He was also a senior fellow at the Harvard Kennedy School. He was a contender for the chief of space operations position. He has written extensively on the space domain and the future of the military's role in space. In 2023, he retired from active duty. After retiring, he joined the advisory board of Sierra Space and the board of directors of Stoke Space.

== Early life and education ==
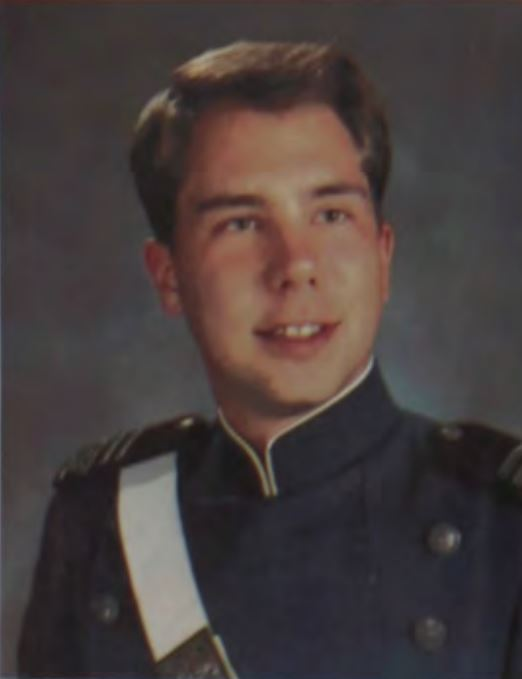
Shaw as a cadet at USAFA.

John Edwin Shaw was born on March 17, 1968. Raised in Norton, Massachusetts, he is a distinguished graduate from the United States Air Force Academy in 1990 with a B.S. degree in astronautical engineering and a minor in Russian language. He later earned an M.S. degree in aeronautics and astronautics from the University of Washington in 1991 with a thesis entitled Optimal Control Designs for an Inverted Cart-Pendulum Array. He went on to receive two M.A. degrees in 1998 and 2004: one in organizational management from George Washington University and one in military operational arts and sciences from Air Command and Staff College, respectively. He also completed a M.S. degree in national security strategy in 2008 from the National War College. He was also a senior executive fellow of the Harvard Kennedy School in 2010.

== Military career ==
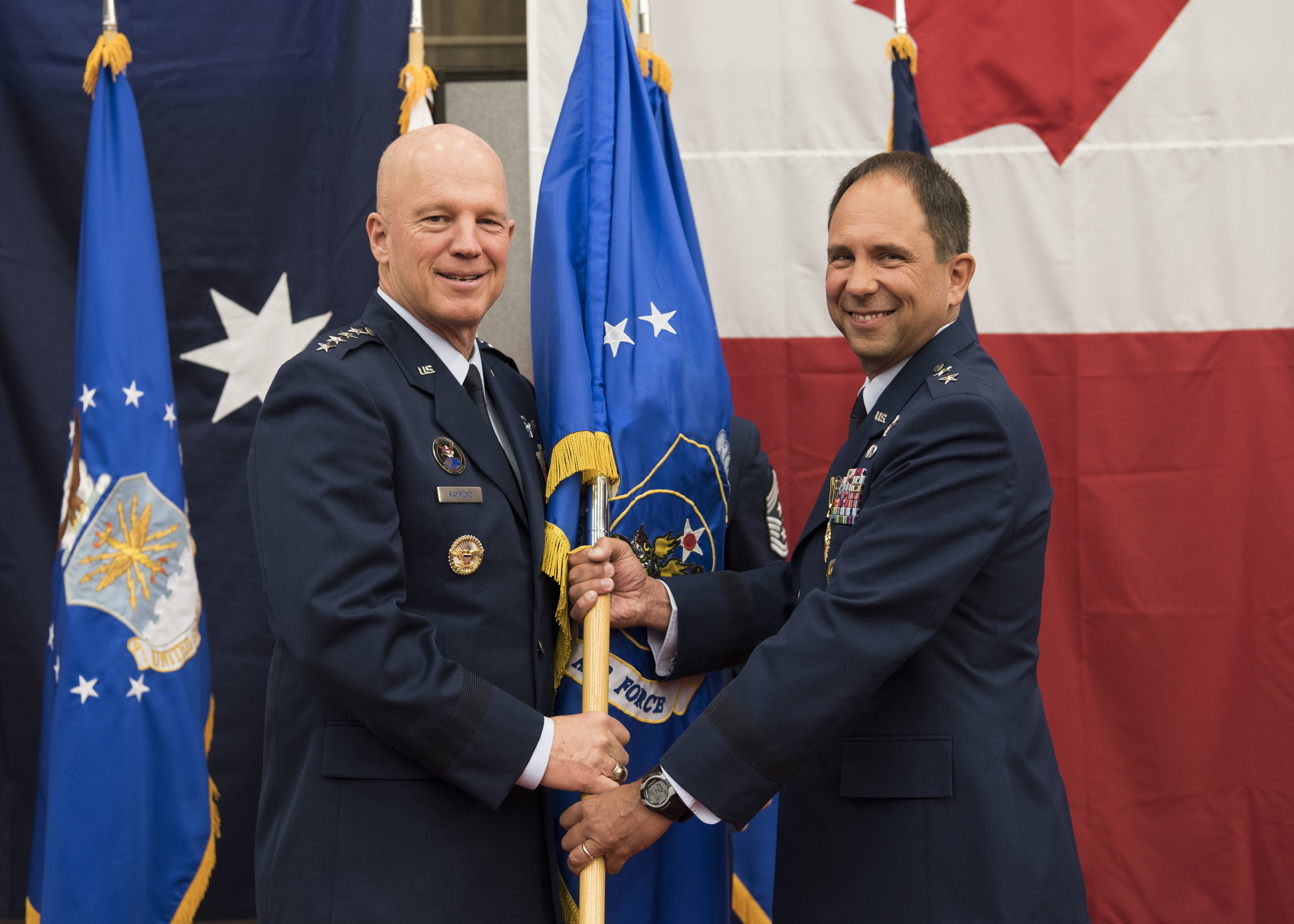
Gen John W. Raymond, presents the 14th Air Force guidon to Shaw, during a change of commander ceremony, 2019.

After graduating from the United States Air Force Academy, Shaw was commissioned into the United States Air Force on May 30, 1990. For a year, he studied at the University of Washington.

His first operational assignment was at the 1st Space Operations Squadron from 1991 to 1994 where he was the deputy crew commander and spacecraft systems engineer. In October 1994, he was assigned as the flight commander and chief of mission analysis at the Mission Control Complex IX, Operating Division 4, Onizuka Air Force Station in California. From 1996 to 1998, he was an intern in the Office of the Deputy Under Secretary of Defense for Space and the Office of the Assistant Secretary of the Air Force for Acquisition at the Pentagon, Washington, D.C.

Shaw was assigned to locations outside the United States from 1998 to 2001. He was first assigned to Ramstein Air Base, Germany for a year as the chief of special information warfare plans for the 32nd Air Operations Group. He was then deployed for two months to Naples, Italy where he was chief of special technical operations for Joint Task Force Noble Anvil during the Kosovo War. After that, he was assigned as the executive officer for director of aerospace operations of the United States Air Forces in Europe.

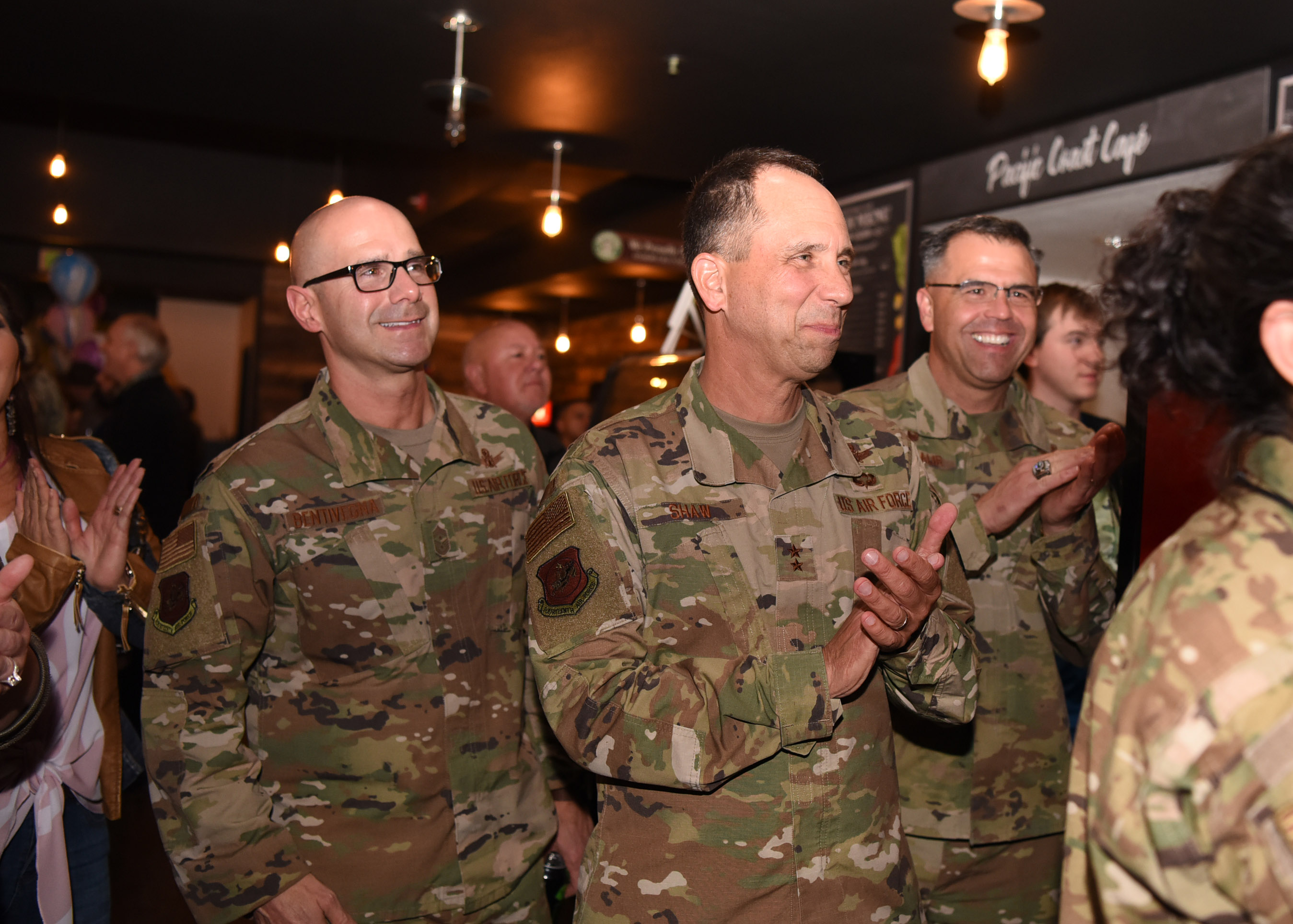
Shaw (center) celebrates with CMSgt John F. Bentivegna (left) and Col Anthony Mastalir (right) after the signing of the NDAA 2019. which established the Space Force.

In 2001, Shaw became a field grade officer, having been promoted to major, and was reassigned to the Air Force headquarters as the deputy chief of the strategy branch in the Directorate for Space Operations and Integration. For a year after that, he was a speechwriter for the secretary of the Air Force and chief of staff, assigned to their executive action group. He spent almost a year at the Air Command and Staff College where he earned an M.A. degree. From 2004 to 2005, he served as the first operations officer for the newly activated 25th Space Control Tactics Squadron. After such tour, he was promoted to lieutenant colonel. He took command of the 4th Space Operations Squadron in June 2005 from Ronald L. Huntley, which he commanded for two years. After his first command duty, he spent a year as a student at the National War College where he completed an M.S. degree in national security strategy.

Shaw was then promoted to colonel in 2008 and assigned as director of the United States Strategic Command commander's action group, serving under General Kevin P. Chilton. On July 1, 2010, he took command of the 50th Operations Group. After two years, he was assigned to the Office of the Deputy Assistant Secretary of Defense (Space Policy) as a senior policy advisor.

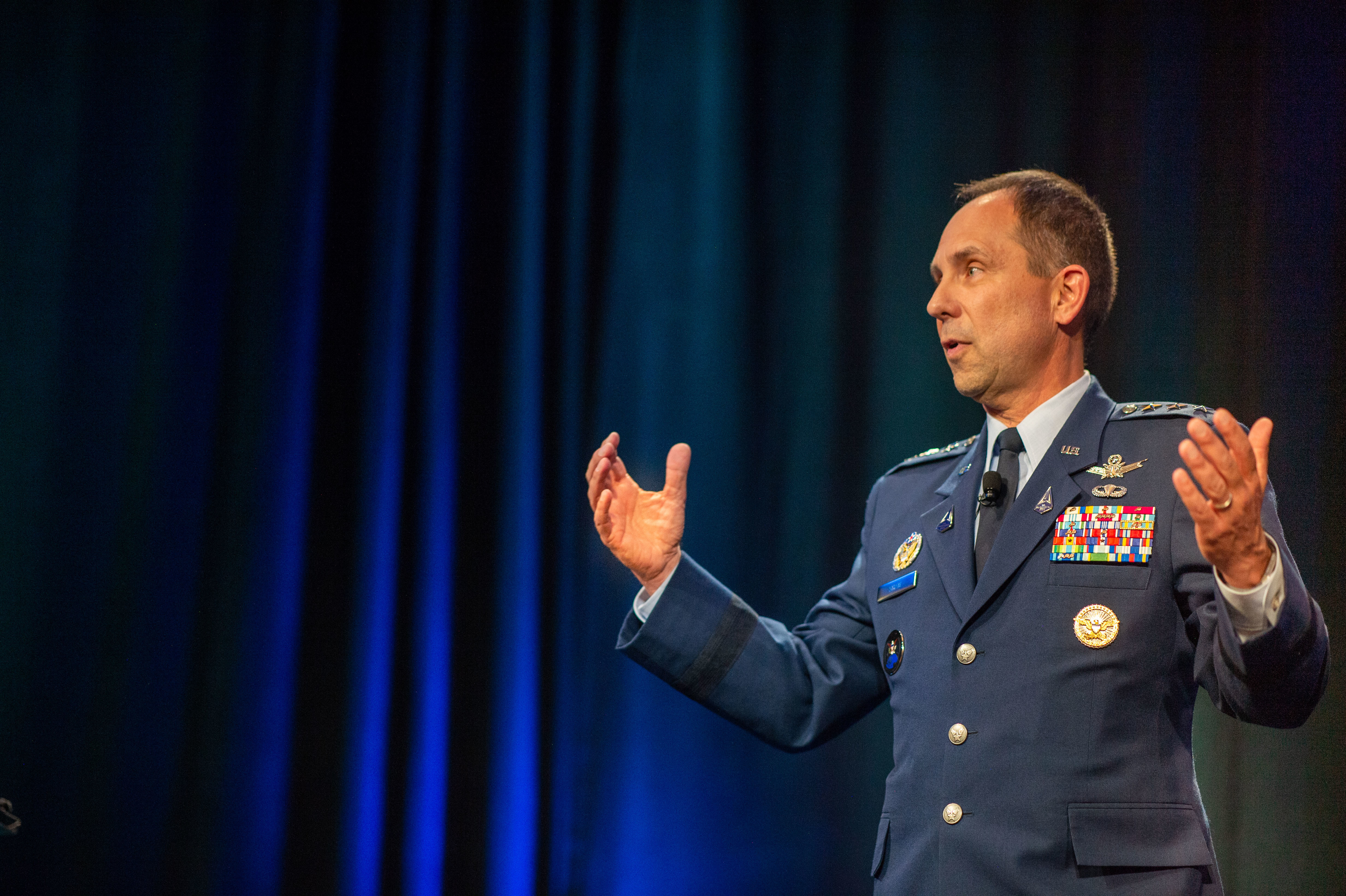
Shaw speaks during the Space Warfighters Luncheon at the 36th Annual Space Symposium, 2021.

After his assignment in Washington, Shaw took command of the 21st Space Wing on July 26, 2013. On June 5, 2015, before relinquishing command to Douglas Schiess, he was promoted to brigadier general. From June 2015 to June 2017, he was assigned to the U.S. Strategic Command as the deputy director for global operations. After that, he was reassigned to the Air Force Space Command first as the director of strategic plans, programs, requirements, and analysis from 2017 to 2018 and then as deputy commander of the major command from 2018 to 2019 after he was promoted to major general.

Shaw took over command of the Combined Force Space Component Command and Fourteenth Air Force after he and Major General Stephen N. Whiting traded their current positions, with Whiting taking over Shaw's position as deputy commander of the Air Force Space Command. On December 20, 2019, with the establishment of the United States Space Force, the Fourteenth Air Force was temporarily redesignated as the Space Operations Command. On October 21, 2020, the Space Operations Command in Vandenberg Air Force Base was inactivated prior to the activation of a separate Space Operations Command, a new field command for which Shaw became the deputy commander.

On September 30, 2020, Shaw was nominated for transfer to the Space Force, promotion to lieutenant general, and assignment as deputy commander of the United States Space Command. He relinquished command of the Combined Force Space Component Command on November 16, 2020, to Major General DeAnna Burt. He was promoted and transferred to the Space Force on November 23, 2020, in a ceremony at the U.S. Air Force Academy and took on duties as deputy commander of U.S. Space Command the next day. On October 5, 2023, he relinquished his position as deputy commander after he extension caused by Senator Tommy Tuberville's hold on his successor's nomination.

Shaw held his retirement ceremony on September 8, 2023. His official retirement was on November 1, 2023.

== Civilian career ==
After retiring, Shaw joined the national security space strategic advisory group of Sierra Space. In April 2024, Stoke Space appointed him to their board of directors.

== Personal life ==
Shaw is married to Tonia Shaw.

== Awards and decorations ==
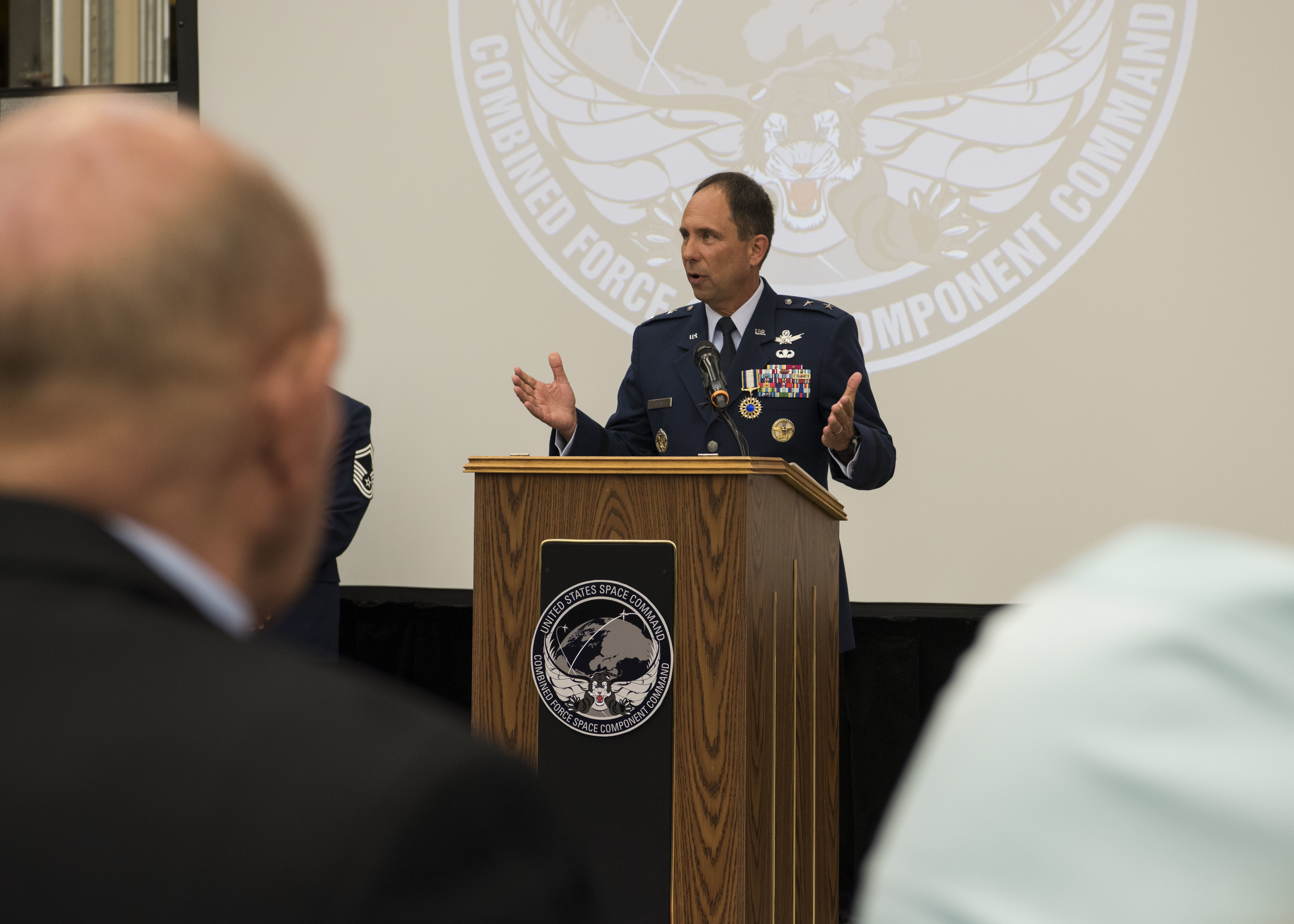
Shaw speaks after receiving the Air Force Distinguished Service Medal in 2019

Shaw is the recipient of the following awards:

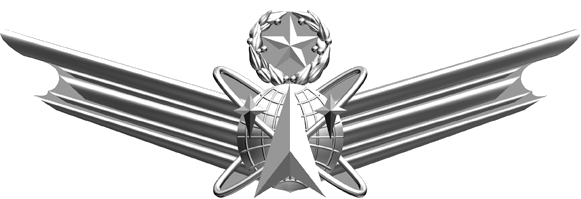
Command Space Operations Badge

Basic Parachutist Badge

Office of the Secretary of Defense Badge

United States Space Command Badge

Air Staff Badge

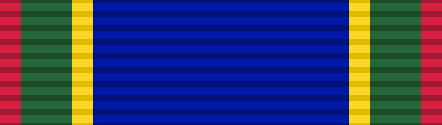
| Defense Distinguished Service Medal |
| Air Force Distinguished Service Medal with one bronze oak leaf cluster |
| Defense Superior Service Medal with one bronze oak leaf cluster |
| Legion of Merit with one bronze oak leaf cluster |
| Defense Meritorious Service Medal |
| Meritorious Service Medal with four bronze oak leaf clusters |
| Joint Service Commendation Medal with oak leaf cluster |
| Joint Service Achievement Medal with oak leaf cluster |
| Air Force Achievement Medal |
| Joint Meritorious Unit Award with three bronze oak leaf clusters |
| Air Force Outstanding Unit Award with two bronze oak leaf clusters |
| Air Force Organizational Excellence Award with one bronze oak leaf cluster |
| Combat Readiness Medal |
| National Reconnaissance Office Distinguished Service Medal (Gold Medal) |
| National Defense Service Medal with one bronze service star |
| Kosovo Campaign Medal with one bronze service star |
| Global War on Terrorism Service Medal |
| Armed Forces Service Medal |
| Air and Space Campaign Medal |
| Air Force Overseas Long Tour Service Ribbon |
| Air Force Longevity Service Award with one silver and three bronze oak leaf clusters |
| Small Arms Expert Marksmanship Ribbon |
| Air Force Training Ribbon |

- General Jerome F. O'Malley Distinguished Space Leadership Award
- Associate Fellow, American Institute of Aeronautics and Astronautics
- National Finalist, White House Fellow Program
- Royal Air Force Historical Society and U.S. Air Force Historical Foundation "Two Air Forces" Award for Writing (1998)

== Dates of promotion ==
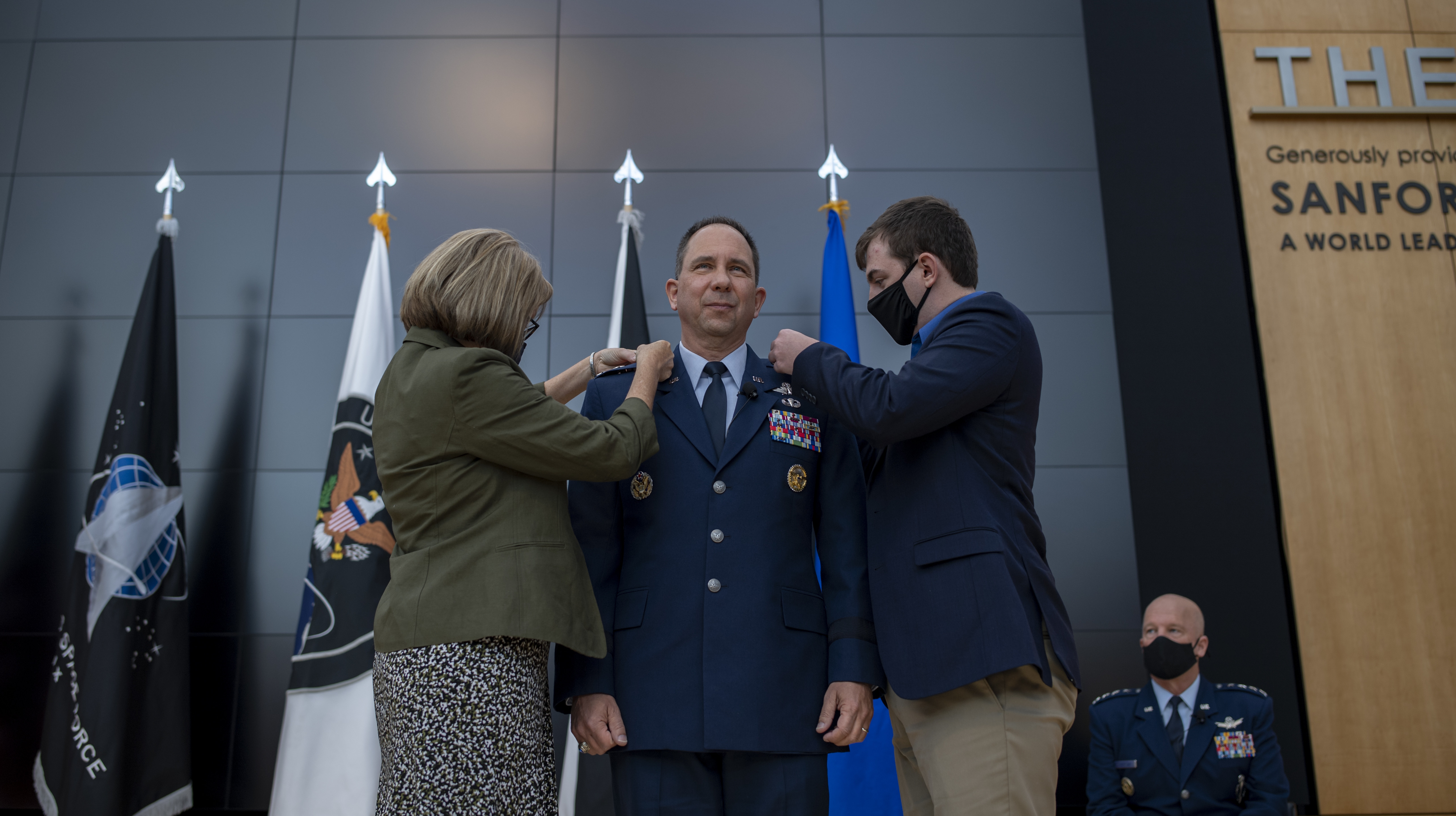
Tonia Shaw (left) and her son, Timothy Shaw (right), pin newly promoted Lt. Gen. Shaw during the general's promotion and transfer ceremony on November 23, 2020.

| Rank | Branch | Date |
|---|---|---|
| Second Lieutenant | Air Force | May 30, 1990 |
| First Lieutenant | Air Force | May 30, 1992 |
| Captain | Air Force | May 30, 1994 |
| Major | Air Force | May 1, 2001 |
| Lieutenant Colonel | Air Force | May 1, 2005 |
| Colonel | Air Force | October 1, 2008 |
| Brigadier General | Air Force | June 5, 2015 |
| Major General | Air Force | August 17, 2018 |
| Lieutenant General | Space Force | November 23, 2020 |

== Writings ==
=== Op-eds ===
- "Welcome to the Third Space Age". SpaceNews. August 29, 2023.
- "The U.S. Space Force must be independent but not insular". SpaceNews. September 13, 2019.

=== Books ===
- With Pete Worden (2002). Whither Space Power? Forging a Strategy for the New Century (PDF). Maxwell Air Force Base, Alabama: Air University Press. ISBN 1-58566-111-2. Archived from the original (PDF) on October 27, 2020.

=== Articles ===
- With Daniel R. Borque and Marcus Shaw (Winter 2023). "Dynamic Space Operations: The New Sustained Space Maneuver Imperative" (PDF). Æther: A Journal of Strategic Airpower & Spacepower. 2 (Special Edition): 8–16.
- With Jean Purgason and Amy Soileau (Spring 2022). "Sailing the Wine-Dark Sea: Space as a Military Area of Responsibility" (PDF). Æther: A Journal of Strategic Airpower & Spacepower. 1 (1): 35–44.
- "Letter to the Editorial Board". Space Force Journal (2). April–June 2021. Archived from the original on August 12, 2021.
- "Guarding the High Ocean: Towards a New National-Security Space Strategy through an Analysis of U.S. Maritime Strategy" (PDF). Air and Space Power Journal. XXIII (1): 55–64. Spring 2009.
- "On Cossacks, Subs, and SAMs: Defeating Challenges to U.S. Space Superiority" (PDF). High Frontier Journal. 1 (3): 23–828. Winter 2005. Archived from the original (PDF) on November 17, 2016.
- Shaw, John E. (Winter 1999). "The Influence of Space Power Upon History: 1944-1998" (PDF). Air Power History Journal. 46 (4): 20–29. JSTOR 26288881.

=== Thesis ===
- Optimal Control Designs for an Inverted Cart-Pendulum Array (PDF) (M.S.). University of Washington. 1991. Archived (PDF) from the original on August 12, 2021.

Military offices
| Preceded by Chris D. Crawford | Commander of the 21st Space Wing; 2013–2015 | Succeeded by Douglas Schiess |
| Preceded by Clinton Crosier | Deputy Director for Global Operations of the United States Strategic Command; 2015–2017 | Succeeded by Gregory S. Bowen |
| Preceded by Nina Armagno | Director of Strategic Plans, Programs, Requirements and Analysis of the Air Force Space Command; 2017–2018 | Succeeded by William Liquori |
| Preceded by Robert J. Skinner | Deputy Commander of the Air Force Space Command; 2018–2019 | Succeeded by Stephen Whiting |
| Preceded by Stephen Whiting | Commander of Space Operations Command; 2019–2020 | Command inactivated |
| Preceded by Stephen Whiting | Commander of the Combined Force Space Component Command; 2019–2020 | Succeeded by DeAnna Burt |
| New office | Vice Commander of Space Operations Command; 2020 | Succeeded by DeAnna Burt |
| Preceded by James H. Dickinson | Deputy Commander of the United States Space Command; 2020–2023 | Succeeded by Thomas L. James |
