= Pousette-Dart Band 3 =

Studio album by Pousette-Dart Band
- Released: 1978
- Studio: Hit Factory, New York City, New York
- Genre: Soft rock
- Length: 39:16
- Label: Capitol
- Producer: Dave Appell, Hank Medress

Pousette-Dart Band chronology
Amnesia (1977)	Pousette-Dart Band 3 (1978)	Never Enough (1979)

Professional ratings
Review scores
Source	Rating
Allmusic	3/5 stars

Pousette-Dart Band 3 is the third album by the American rock band Pousette-Dart Band, released in 1978.

== Track listing ==
All songs by Jon Pousette-Dart, except where listed.

1. "Next To You" – 4:24
2. "Stand By Me" (Ben E. King, Jerry Leiber, Mike Stoller) – 3:40
3. "Love Is My Belief" (John Curtis) – 4:56
4. "I Stayed Away Too Long" (Don Covay) – 3:52
5. "Where Are You Going" – 2:32
6. "Louisiana" – 6:07
7. "Too Blue to Be True" – 3:45
8. "Mr. Saturday Night" – 4:55
9. "Lord's Song" – 5:05

== Personnel ==
=== Pousette-Dart Band ===
- Jon Pousette: Guitars (Acoustic, Electric and Slide), Vocals (all tracks)
- John G. Curtis: Mandolin, Guitars (all tracks except 5)
- John Troy: Bass (all tracks except 5)
- Michael Dawe: Drums, Percussion (all tracks except 5)

=== Additional Personnel ===
- Norman Pride, Hank Medress: Percussion
- Stan Schwartz: Keyboards
- Dave Appell: String Arrangement on track 9

== Chart positions ==
Chart (1978)	Peak position
U.S. Billboard 200	161

It drew a mostly positive retrospective review from Joe Viglione of Allmusic, who gave it 3 stars. "Out of the four albums released by the Pousette-Dart Band on Capitol," he said, "Pousette-Dart Band 3 may be the most satisfying." Viglione noted Buffalo Springfield as an influence and considered the album's second side "extraordinary." He said it was "an album that truly deserves a better fate than obscurity."
