= Stephen Denker =

U.S. Air Force general

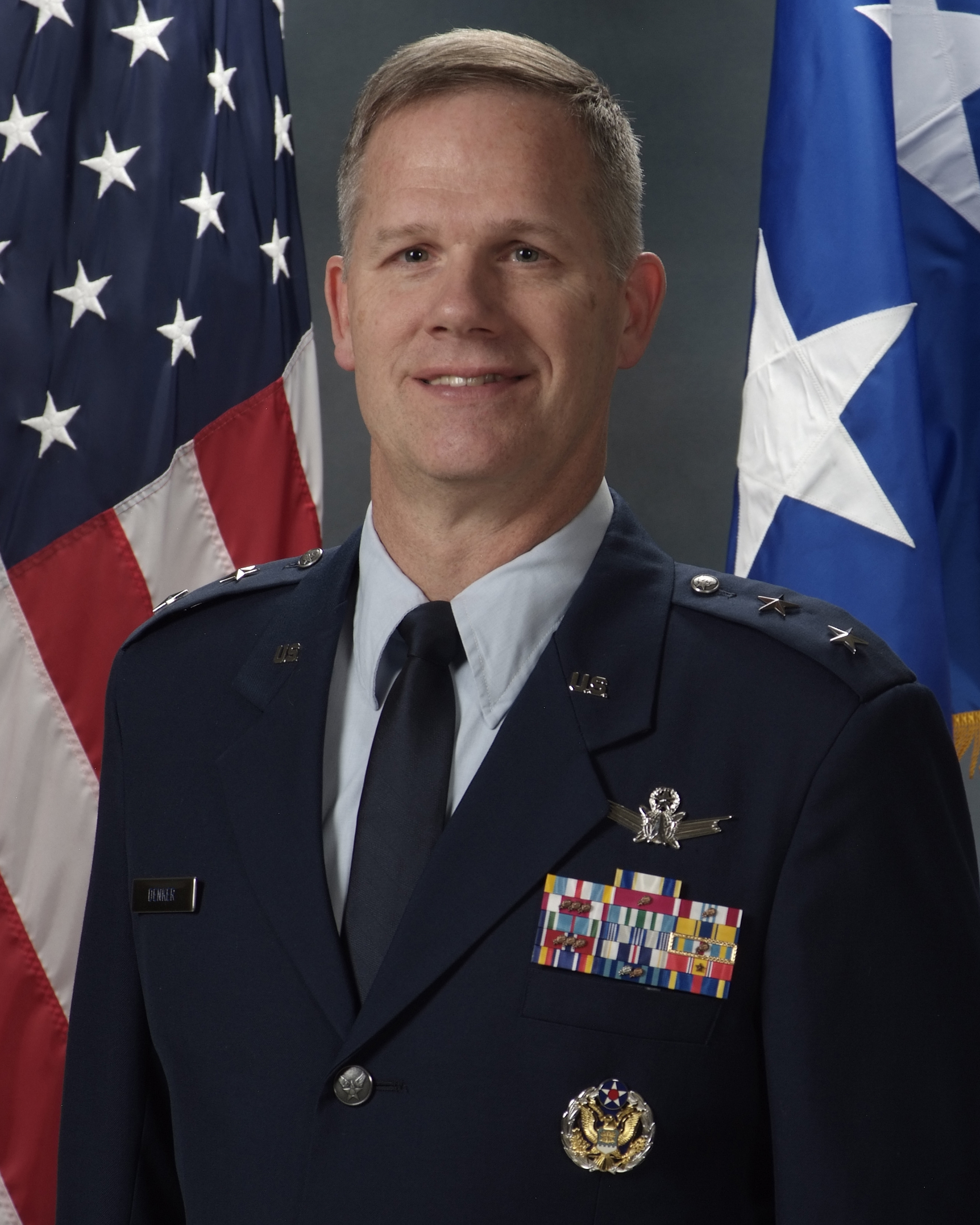
- Official portrait, 2014
- Military career
- Allegiance: United States
- Branch: United States Air Force
- Service years: 1986–2018
- Rank: Major general
- Commands: Air Command and Staff College; Aerospace Data Facility-Colorado; 84th Specialized Management Squadron
- Awards: Air Force Distinguished Service Medal; Defense Superior Service Medal; Legion of Merit (2)

Stephen T. Denker is a retired United States Air Force major general who now is a vice president at Lockheed Martin. In the U.S. Air Force, he last served as the deputy director of the National Reconnaissance Office.

Military offices
Preceded by David D. Thompson	Commander of Aerospace Data Facility-Colorado; 2009–2011	Succeeded by Ronald L. Huntley
Preceded by David J. Buck	Director of Integrated Air, Space, Cyberspace, and ISR Operations of the Air Force Space Command; 2014–2015	Succeeded by Stephen Whiting
Preceded by Anthony J. Cotton	Deputy Director of the National Reconnaissance Office; 2015–2018	Succeeded by Mark Baird
