= Christopher Povak =

U.S. Space Force general

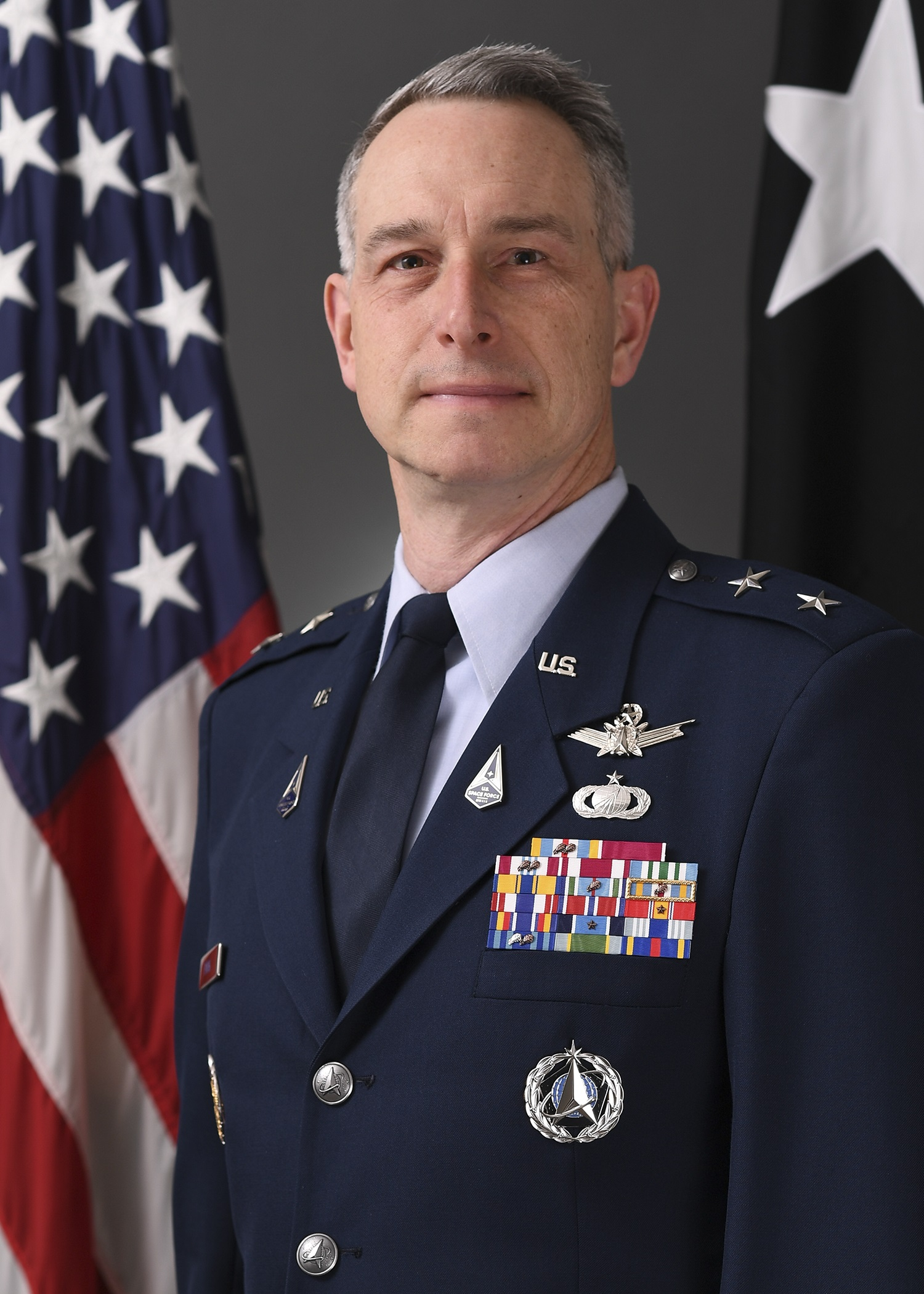
- Official portrait, 2023
- Born: November 26, 1970 (age 55); Connecticut, U.S.
- Education: Clarkson University (BS): Colorado Technical University (MS)
- Military career
- Allegiance: United States
- Branch: United States Air Force: United States Space Force
- Service years: 1992–2021 (Air Force): 2021–present (Space Force)
- Rank: Major General
- Commands: Space Force Element to the National Reconnaissance Office: Aerospace Data Facility-Colorado; Air Force Element, RAF Menwith Hill; Operations Division 7
- Awards: Defense Superior Service Medal (3): Legion of Merit

Christopher Stephen Povak (born November 26, 1970) is a United States Space Force major general who serves as the deputy director of the National Reconnaissance Office and commander of the Space Force Element to the National Reconnaissance Office. He previously served as the deputy director of the Space Warfighting Analysis Center.

Povak received his commission from Clarkson University in 1992. He has extensive experience in satellite operations, engineering, and acquisitions with the Air Force Space Command and National Reconnaissance Office. He has commanded NRO's Aerospace Data Facility-Colorado, Air Force Element at RAF Menwith Hill, and Operations Division 7. He has also served as a military legislative advisor to Senator Joseph I. Lieberman.

In 2021, Povak transferred to the Space Force. A year later, he was promoted to major general. As deputy director of the NRO, he assists the director in managing the strategic and tactical priorities of the NRO. He also leads the military personnel assigned to NRO, manages the associated service resources, and serves as senior advisor to the director on all military matters.

== Education ==
- 1992 Bachelor of Science, Electrical Engineering, Clarkson University, Potsdam, N.Y.
- 1997 Undergraduate Space and Missile Training, Vandenberg Air Force Base, Calif.
- 1998 Master of Science, Electrical Engineering, Colorado Technical University, Colo.
- 1999 Squadron Officer School, Distinguished Graduate, Maxwell AFB, Ala.
- 2003 Air Command and Staff College, Maxwell AFB, Ala., by correspondence
- 2005 Master of Arts, Military Operational Art and Science, Air University, Maxwell AFB, Ala.
- 2005 Air Command and Staff College, Distinguished Graduate, Maxwell AFB, Ala.
- 2007 Air War College, Maxwell AFB, Ala., by correspondence
- 2011 Senior Executive Fellowship, Harvard University, Cambridge, Mass.
- 2012 National War College, Fort Lesley J. McNair, Washington, D.C.
- 2012 Master of Science, National Security Strategy, National War College, National Defense University, Fort Lesley J. McNair, Washington, D.C.

== Military career ==
In September 2022, Povak was nominated for promotion to major general.

== Assignments ==
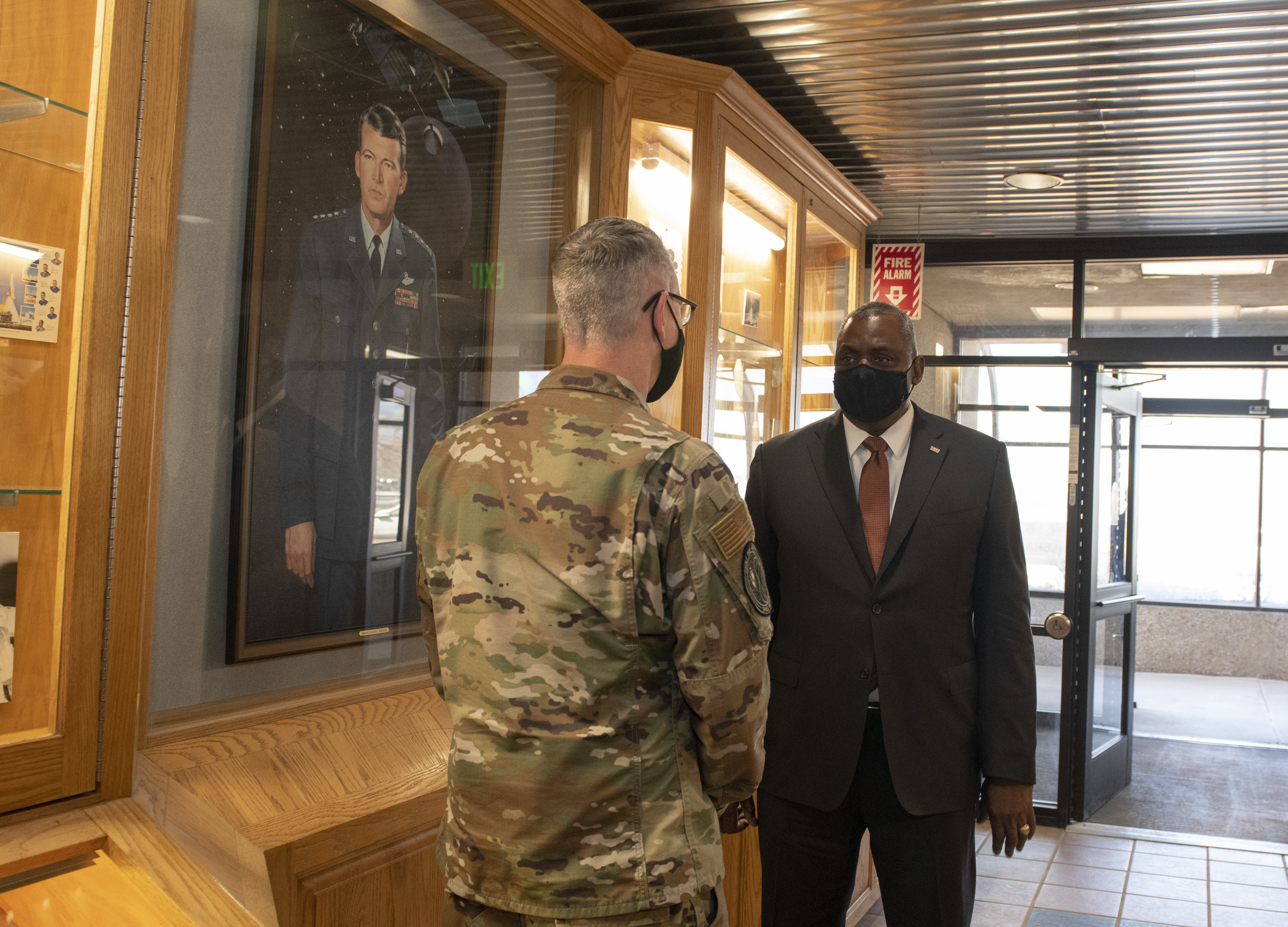
Povak tours Secretary Austin, Schriever Air Force Base, Colorado, 2021

1. March 1993–July 1996, Air Force Satellite Control Network Capacity Engineer, 50th Space Wing Plans, Schriever Air Force Base, Colo.
2. August 1996–August 1997, Flight Commander, Operating Division 4/DC, Onizuka Air Force Station, Calif.
3. September 1997–May 2000, Chief, Space Systems Engineering, Operating Division 4/DC, Onizuka AFS, Calif.
4. June 2000–May 2002, Director of Operations, Air Force Operations Element, Washington, D.C.
5. June 2002–August 2003, Director of Engineering, Air Force Operations Element, Washington, D.C.
6. September 2003–July 2004, Congressional Fellow, Office of Senator Joseph I. Lieberman, Washington, D.C.
7. August 2004–June 2005, Student, Air Command and Staff College, Maxwell AFB, Ala.
8. June 2005–July 2006, Chief, Space Programs Planning, Programming, and Budgeting, Directorate of Space Acquisition, Headquarters U.S. Air Force, the Pentagon, Arlington, Va.
9. August 2006–July 2007, Chief, Congressional and Media Affairs Branch, Directorate of Space Acquisition, Headquarters U.S. Air Force, the Pentagon, Arlington, Va.
10. August 2007–June 2008, Program Element Monitor, Transformational Satellite Communications, Directorate of Space Acquisition, Headquarters U.S. Air Force, the Pentagon, Arlington, Va.
11. July 2008–June 2010, Commander, Operations Division 7 and Deputy Chief Overhead Collection Management Center, Fort George G. Meade, Md.
12. July 2010–July 2011, Executive Officer to the Deputy Director, National Reconnaissance Office, Chantilly, Va.
13. August 2011–June 2012, Student, National War College, Fort Lesley J. McNair, Washington, D. C.
14. July 2012–July 2015, Commander, Air Force Element, RAF Menwith Hill, United Kingdom
15. August 2015–May 2016, Deputy Director, Mission Operations Directorate, National Reconnaissance Office, Chantilly, Va.
16. June 2016–August 2019, Commander, Aerospace Data Facility Colorado, Buckley AFB, Colo.
17. June 2016–August 2019, Commander, Air Force Element Space Operations Wing, Buckley AFB, Colo. (December 2018–June 2019, Acting Commander, Air Force Element, NRO, Chantilly, Va.)
18. September 2019 – July 2021, Deputy Commander, Joint Task Force Space Defense, Schriever AFB, Colo
19. July 2021 – September 2022, Deputy Director, Space Warfighting Analysis Center, Washington D.C.
20. September 2022 – present, Deputy Director and Space Force Element Commander, National Reconnaissance Office, Chantilly, Va.

== Awards and decorations ==
Povak is the recipient of the following awards:

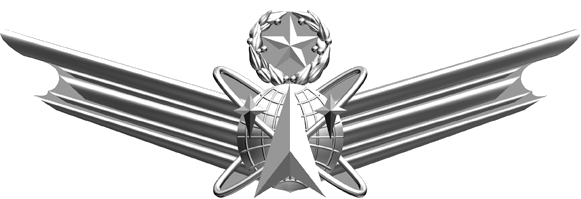
Command Space Operations Badge

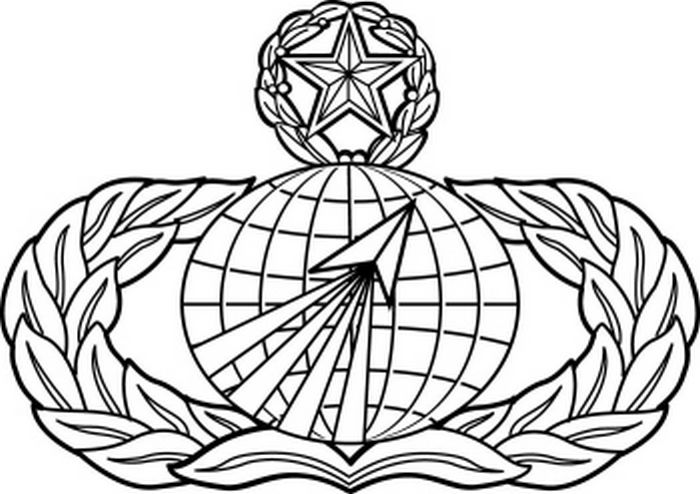

Air Force Master Acquisition and Financial Management Badge

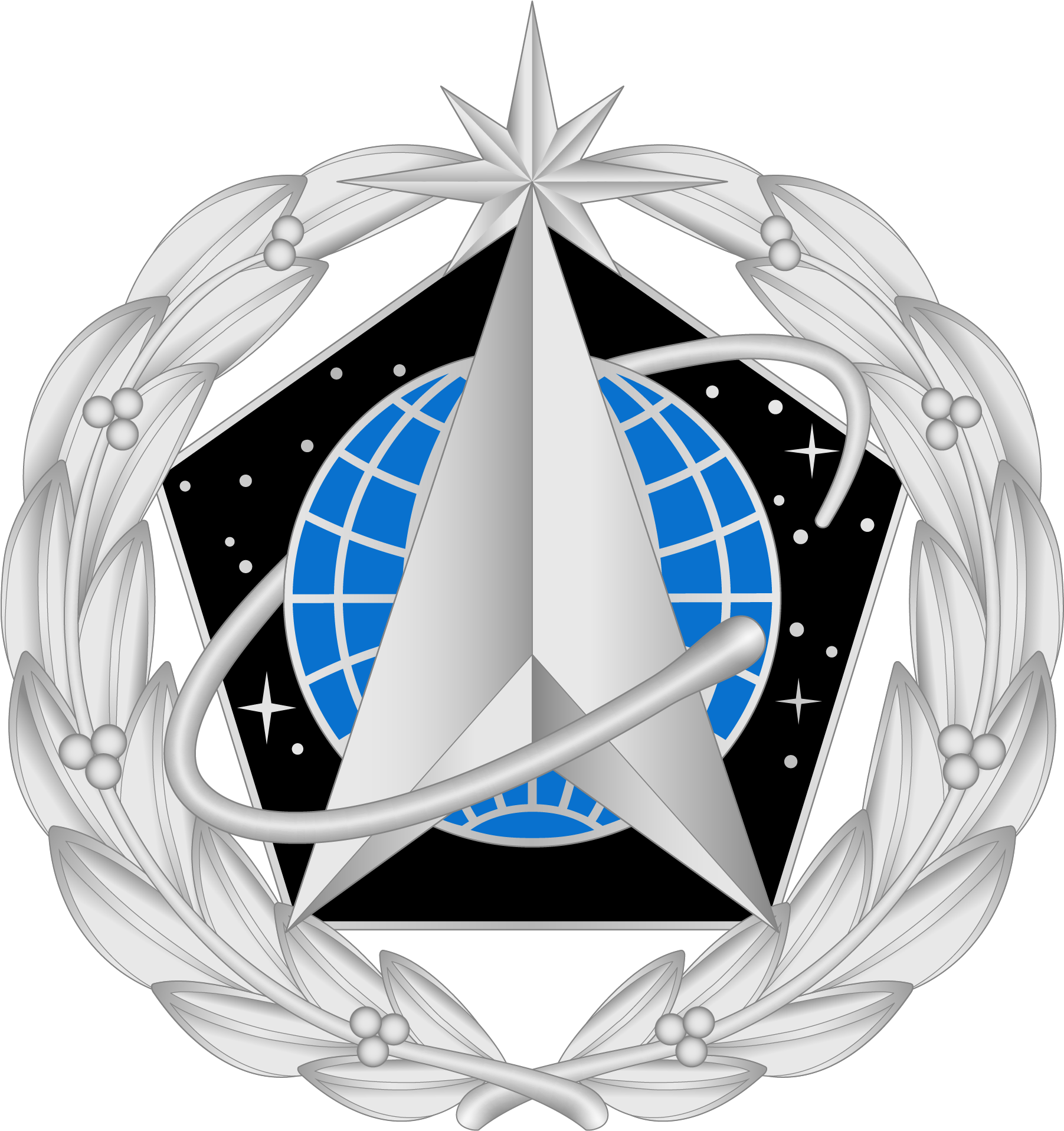

Space Staff Badge

Air Staff Badge

Defense Superior Service Medal with two bronze oak leaf clusters
Legion of Merit
Defense Meritorious Service Medal with two bronze oak leaf clusters
Meritorious Service Medal
Joint Service Commendation Medal
Air Force Commendation Medal
Joint Service Achievement Medal with one bronze oak leaf cluster
Joint Meritorious Unit Award with one bronze oak leaf cluster
Air Force Meritorious Unit Award
Air Force Organizational Excellence Award
National Defense Service Medal with one bronze service star
Global War on Terrorism Service Medal
Remote Combat Effects Campaign Medal with one bronze service star
Air Force Overseas Long Tour Service Ribbon
Air Force Longevity Service Award with one silver and one bronze oak leaf clusters
Air Force Small Arms Expert Marksmanship Ribbon
Air Force Training Ribbon

== Dates of promotion ==
Rank	Branch	Date
Second Lieutenant	Air Force	May 15, 1992
First Lieutenant	Air Force	October 15, 1994
Captain	Air Force	October 15, 1996
Major	Air Force	April 1, 2003
Lieutenant Colonel	Air Force	December 1, 2006
Colonel	Air Force	May 1, 2012
Brigadier General	Air Force	March 2, 2019
Brigadier General	Space Force	~April 29, 2021
Major General	Space Force	September 29, 2022

Military offices
Preceded by ???	Commander of the Air Force Element at RAF Menwith Hill; 2013–2015	Succeeded by Todd R. Moore
Preceded by Daniel D. Wright III	Commander of Aerospace Data Facility-Colorado; 2016–2019	Succeeded by Jacob Middleton Jr.
Preceded by Mark Baird	Deputy Director of the National Reconnaissance Office; Acting; 2018–2019	Succeeded by Michael Guetlein
New office	Deputy Commander of Joint Task Force–Space Defense; 2019–2021	Succeeded by Dennis Bythewood
New office	Deputy Director of the Space Warfighting Analysis Center; 2021–2022	Succeeded by Russell E. Partch
Preceded by Donna D. Shipton	Deputy Director of and Commander of the Space Force Element to the National Reconnaissance Office; 2022–present	Incumbent
