= Terrence Feehan =

U.S. Air Force general

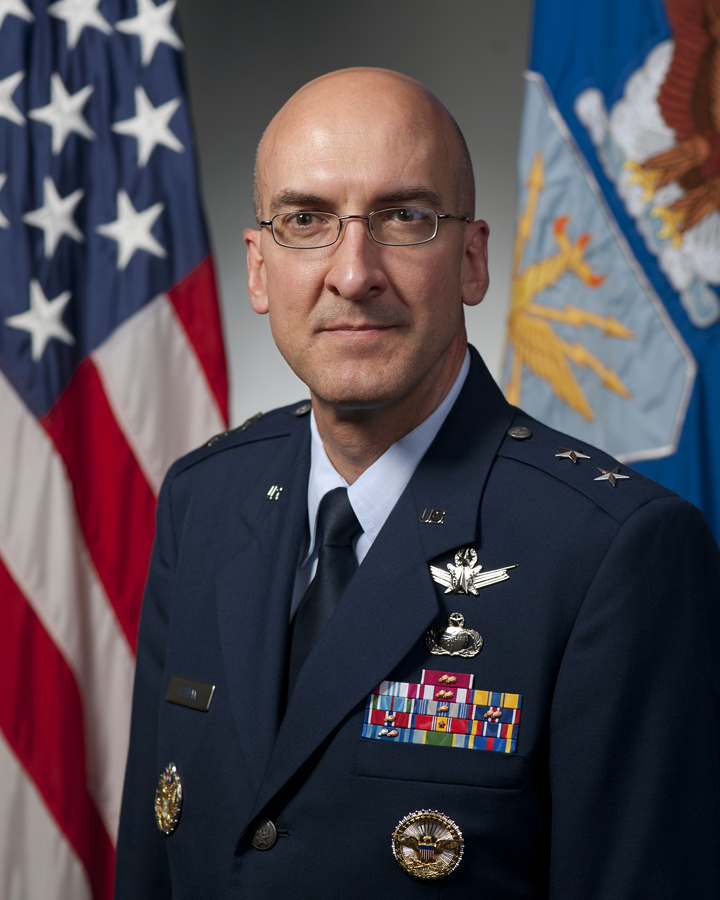
- Official portrait, 2011
- Military career
- Allegiance: United States
- Branch: United States Air Force
- Service years: 1984–2015
- Rank: Major general
- Commands: Air Force Nuclear Weapons Center; 377th Air Base Wing; 88th Mission Support Group; 88th Support Group; 338th Training Squadron
- Awards: Defense Superior Service Medal; Legion of Merit (3)

Terrence (Terry) Feehan is a retired major general in the United States Air Force and was the Director of Strategic Plans and Requirements, Headquarters Air Force Space Command, Peterson Air Force Base, Colorado. In that role he was responsible for developing strategy, doctrine and policy for the command's space and cyberspace operations. After his military retirement, he became a vice president at Northrop Grumman where he directed a variety of staff functions and served as a major program director.

General Feehan received his commission as a distinguished graduate of the U.S. Air Force Academy in 1984. He commanded at the squadron, group, wing and numbered air force levels, and served as an engineer, acquisition program manager and inspector general. He has also held assignments at the major command and headquarters Air Force levels, and was a Secretary of Defense Fellow at the Accenture Corporation, Northbrook, Ill.

== Education and training ==
- 1984 Bachelor of Science in Mechanical Engineering, U.S. Air Force Academy, Colorado Springs, Colo., distinguished graduate
- 1988 Squadron Officer School, Maxwell AFB, Ala., distinguished graduate
- 1989 Master of Science in Engineering Management, West Coast University, Calif.
- 1994 Program Managers Course, Defense Systems Management College, Fort Belvoir, Va.
- 1995 Air Command and Staff College, Maxwell AFB, Ala.
- 1998 Air War College, by seminar
- 2001 Secretary of Defense Fellow, Accenture, Northbrook, Ill.
- 2005 Joint Professional Military Education, Phase II, Joint Forces Staff College, Norfolk, Va.
- 2007 Leadership for a Democratic Society, Federal Executive Institute, Charlottesville, Va.
- 2009 Capstone General and Flag Officer Course, National Defense University, Fort Lesley J. McNair, Washington, D.C.

== Military assignments ==
- June 1984 – June 1986, Project Manager ICBM Test Range, 6595th Test Group, Vandenberg AFB, Calif.
- June 1986 – August 1989, Flight-test Manager, Peacekeeper ICBM, 6595th Test Group, Vandenberg AFB, Calif.
- August 1989 – October 1991, Lead Structures Engineer, Tri-Service Standoff Attack Missile System Program Office, Wright-Patterson AFB, Ohio
- October 1991 – May 1992, Executive Officer, Tri-Service Standoff Attack Missile System Program Office, Wright-Patterson AFB, Ohio
- May 1992 – January 1994, Action Officer, Headquarters Air Force Materiel Command, Wright-Patterson AFB, Ohio
- January 1994 – August 1994, Student, Defense Systems Management College, Fort Belvoir, Va.
- August 1994 – June 1995, Student, Air Command and Staff College, Maxwell AFB, Ala.
- June 1995 – July 1998, Chief, Acquisition Oversight and Policy, Secretary of the Air Force, Office of the Inspector General, Washington, D.C.
- July 1998 – June 2000, Commander, 338th Training Squadron, Keesler AFB, Miss.
- June 2000 – June 2001, Secretary of Defense Corporate Fellow, Accenture, Northbrook, Ill.
- June 2001 – September 2002, Commander, 88th Support Group, Wright-Patterson AFB, Ohio
- October 2002 – March 2003, Commander, 88th Mission Support Group, Wright-Patterson AFB, Ohio
- March 2003 – June 2005, Materiel Wing Director, F-15 Eagle System Program Office, ASC, Wright-Patterson AFB, Ohio.
- July 2005 – July 2006, Commander, 377th Air Base Wing, Kirtland AFB, N.M.
- July 2006 – April 2008, Commander, Air Force Nuclear Weapons Center, Kirtland AFB, N.M.
- April 2008 – June 2009, Vice Commander, Electronic Systems Center, Hanscom AFB, Mass.
- June 2009 – August 2012, Program Executive, Programs and Integration, Missile Defense Agency, Huntsville, Ala.
- August 2012 – June 2014, Vice Commander, Space and Missile Systems Center, Los Angeles AFB, Calif.
- June 2014 – present, Director of Strategic Plans and Requirements, Peterson AFB, Colo.

== Promotion history ==
Effective dates of promotion:

- Second Lieutenant May 30, 1984
- First Lieutenant May 30, 1986
- Captain May 30, 1988
- Major October 1, 1994
- Lieutenant Colonel January 1, 1998
- Colonel April 1, 2001
- Brigadier General September 2, 2008
- Major General October 7, 2011

== Awards and decorations ==
His major awards and decorations include:

- Defense Superior Service Medal
- Legion of Merit with two oak leaf clusters
- Defense Meritorious Service Medal
- Meritorious Service Medal with two oak leaf clusters
- Air Force Commendation Medal
- Joint Service Achievement Medal
- Air Force Achievement Medal with oak leaf cluster
- National Defense Service Medal with bronze star

Military offices
New office	Commander of the Air Force Nuclear Weapons Center; 2006–2008	Succeeded by Everett H. Thomas
Preceded by Arthur J. Rooney Jr.	Vice Commander of the Electronic Systems Center; 2008–2009	Succeeded by Mark Spillman
Preceded by Roger Teague	Vice Commander of the Space and Missile Systems Center; 2012–2014	Succeeded by Robert McMurry
Preceded by Ronald Huntley	Director of Strategic Plans, Programs, and Analysis of the Air Force Space Command; 2014–2015	Succeeded by Nina Armagno
