= Aerospace Data Facility-Colorado =

Satellite ground station operated by the U.S. National Reconnaissance Office

Coordinates: 39.701667°N 104.751667°W

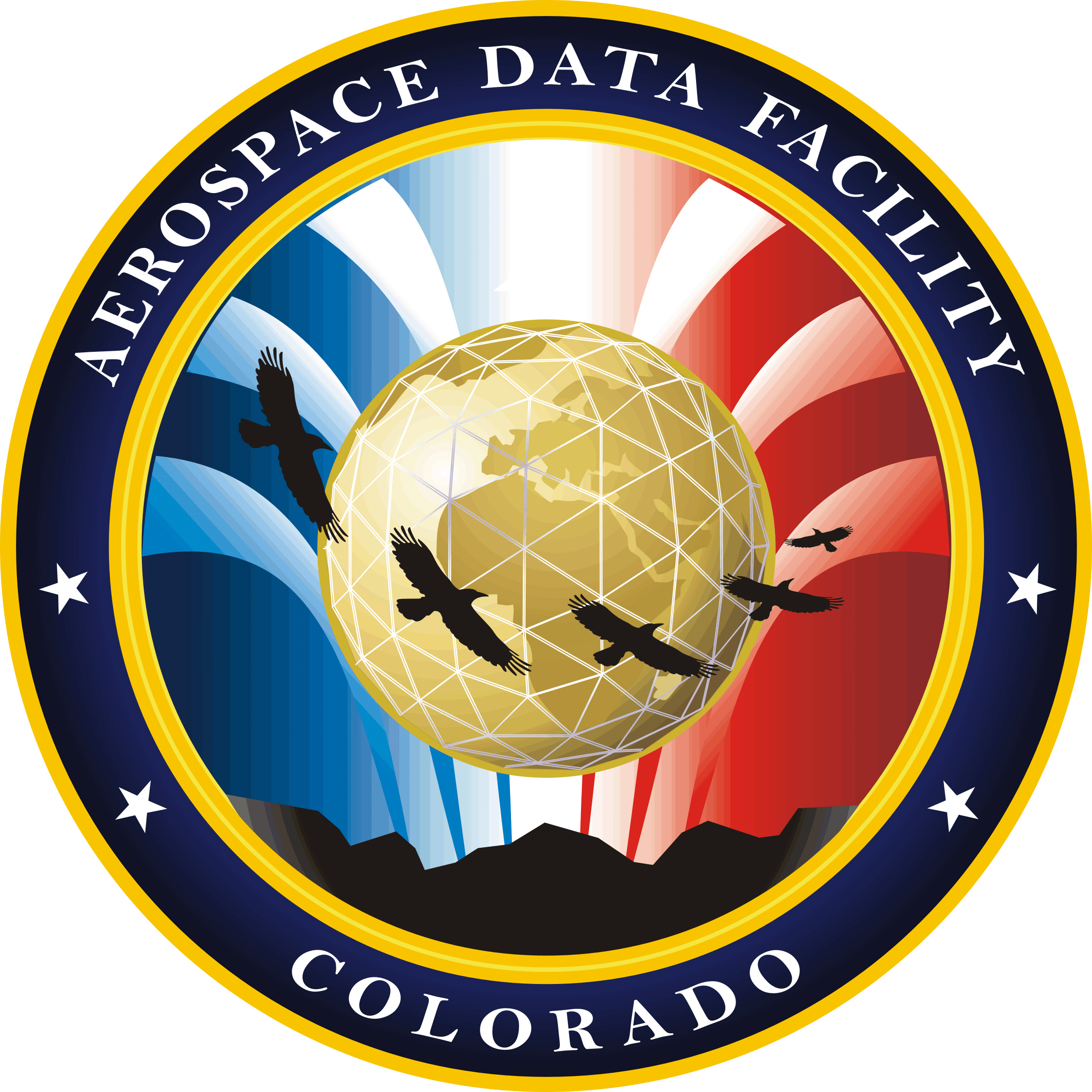
- Country: United States
- Branch: United States Space Force
- Type: Satellite ground station
- Part of: National Reconnaissance Office
- Headquarters: Buckley Space Force Base; Aurora, Colorado, U.S.

Commanders
- Current commander: Col Aaron L. Cochran

Insignia
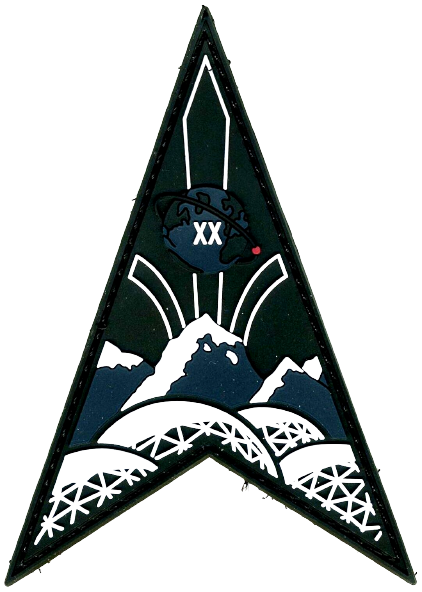
- Space Delta 20

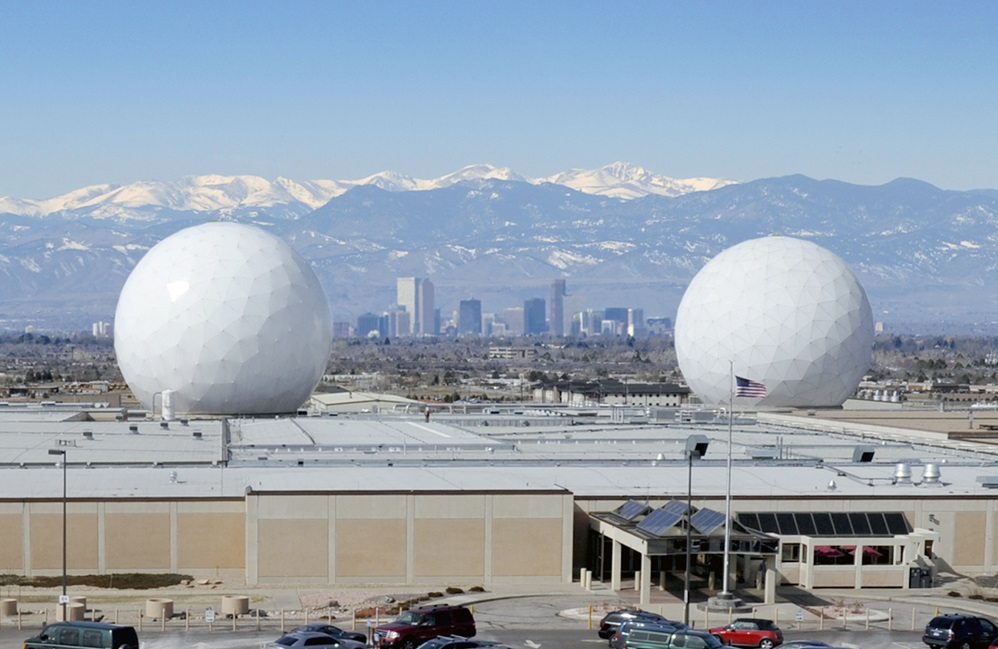
Aerospace Data Facility Colorado (ADF-C) on Buckley Space Force Base.

Aerospace Data Facility-Colorado (ADF-C) or Space Delta 20 (DEL 20) or Consolidated Denver Mission Ground Station (CDMGS) one of three satellite ground stations operated by the National Reconnaissance Office (NRO) and United States Space Force in the continental United States. Located within Buckley Space Force Base in Aurora, Colorado, the facility is responsible for the command and control of reconnaissance satellites involved in the collection of intelligence information and for the dissemination of that intelligence to other U.S. government agencies.

== List of commanders ==
- Col Cary C. Chun, July 2005–August 2007
- Col David D. Thompson, July 2007–May 2009
- Col Stephen Denker, July 2009–January 2011
- Col Ronald L. Huntley, January 2011–August 2012
- Col B. Chance Saltzman, June 2012–June 2014
- Col Daniel D. Wright III
- Brig Gen Christopher Povak, June 2016–August 2019
- Col Jacob Middleton Jr., 29 August 2019
- Brig Gen Robert J. Schreiner, 12 August 2021
- Col David E. Gallagher, July 2024
- Col Aaron L. Cochran, July 2026

== See also ==
- Aerospace Data Facility-East
- Aerospace Data Facility-Southwest
