= Jeffrey Teague (music producer) =

American music producer

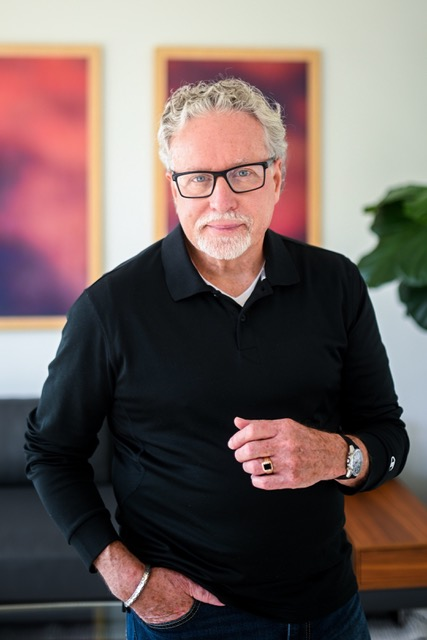
- Education: Berklee College of Music
- Occupation: American music producer

Jeffrey Teague is an American music producer, publisher, musician and creative branding executive based in Nashville, Tennessee. He has worked with Ricky Skaggs, Harry Chapin, Kathy Mattea, Keith Stegall, Ray Stevens, Steve Forbert, Lobo, Paul Overstreet and Alecia Elliott.

== Background and Career ==
Teague attended Palm Beach State College where he studied Business administration. During that time, Teague founded The Villagers band, as a vocalist and drummer. After his education in Palm Beach he attended Berklee College of Music where he studied Instrumental Performance.

After Berklee and while still in Boston in 1977, Teague joined the Pousette-Dart Band, which signed with Capitol Records, who engaged the notable Norbert Putnam as producer. The band released the acclaimed album Amnesia during this same year, which first brought Teague to Nashville to record with the band.

Teague moved to New York City in 1978 and worked in some of the city's premier venues and studios, and also as a musician in the Broadway productions of Oh! Calcutta!, The Best Little Whorehouse in Texas, and Annie.

=== Nashville, Tennessee - 1982-1993 ===
Teague relocated to Nashville in 1982, where he co-founded Stillman/Teague Music Productions serving as a producer and managing partner in the company where he was responsible for business management, account development, and company promotion. The company released work by Burl Ives and more. He delivered advertising and audio/visual projects for Procter & Gamble, Fifth Third Bank, AT&T/BellSouth, AMC Theatres, Cincinnati Fine Arts Association, Acme Boots, The Nashville Network (TNN), PBS, and other notable companies. His early Nashville vocal talent production credits include: T. Graham Brown, Pam Tillis, Trisha Yearwood, and Joe Diffie, while project highlights include: TNN video segments, Crook & Chase "Weekdays" theme, Hurricane Hugo PBS Special, and Acme Boot campaign.

In 1990, Teague became owner and president of Earworks and Overdub Music Publishing. During the next four years, Teague was responsible for Independent A&R, music production, publishing, artist development and showcasing. Teague developed songwriters, copyrights, and publishing catalogues licensed through ASCAP (Earworks), SESAC, and BMI (Overdub). He facilitated the negotiation and execution of contracts, as well as song copyright licensing and registrations. During this time his client roster included: Warner Chappell Music, Columbia Records, MCA/Universal, and Word Records.

=== Word Nashville Tenure — 1994-1999 ===
Between 1994 and 1999 Teague served as GM/Vice President for Word Nashville. He represented his division and parent company, Gaylord Entertainment, for industry-wide events and functions. He provided A&R direction/executive production for projects featuring Collin Raye, Kenny Rogers, Chet Atkins, Michael W. Smith, Ricky Van Shelton, Skip Ewing, and Gary Chapman, and compilation projects featuring Patty Loveless, Rick Trevino, Shenandoah, Ricky Skaggs, and Doug Stone, among several others.

=== 2000 – Present ===
Teague’s Word Nashville position, projects and professional reputation led to recruitment by Seventeen Grand Recording as Creative Director/Staff Producer, a position he held from 2000 to 2007. His role also included having input in studio operational and coordination duties. This long-standing Nashville recording studio was known for its diverse range of multi-genre artists. Teague launched this position working with CCM notables The Imperials, among others.

Teague has served as president and General Manager of the company Artists & Repertoire, LLC since 2008. His recording and touring credits include: Harry Chapin, Lobo, Ricky Skaggs, Ray Stevens, Kathy Mattea, Steve Forbert, Wet Willie, Jimmy Hall. His music publishing credits include songs recorded by George Jones, John Michael Montgomery, Randy Houser, Hank Williams Jr, Van Zant, Alecia Elliott, Darby Ledbetter, Bailey James and more.

In addition to his career in the music industry, Jeffrey Teague is a U.S. Army veteran.
