= Teagues =

Teagues may refer to:

- Vince Teagues, fictional character
- Dave Teagues, fictional character
- Janine Teagues, fictional character on Abbott Elementary

== See also ==
- Teague (disambiguation)
