= Infrared Space Systems Directorate =

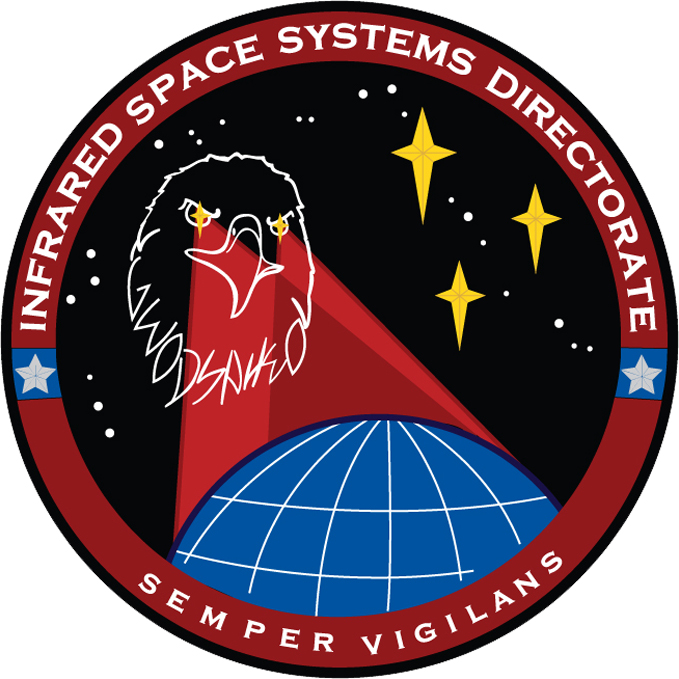
- ISSD emblem
- Active: 197?-Present
- Country: United States
- Branch: United States Air Force
- Garrison/HQ: Los Angeles Air Force Base

The United States Air Force's Infrared Space Systems Directorate is located at Los Angeles Air Force Base.

Current and former designations:

- Infrared Space Systems Directorate (2011–present)
- Space-Based Infrared Systems Wing (197?-2011)
