= Roger Teague =

U.S. Air Force general

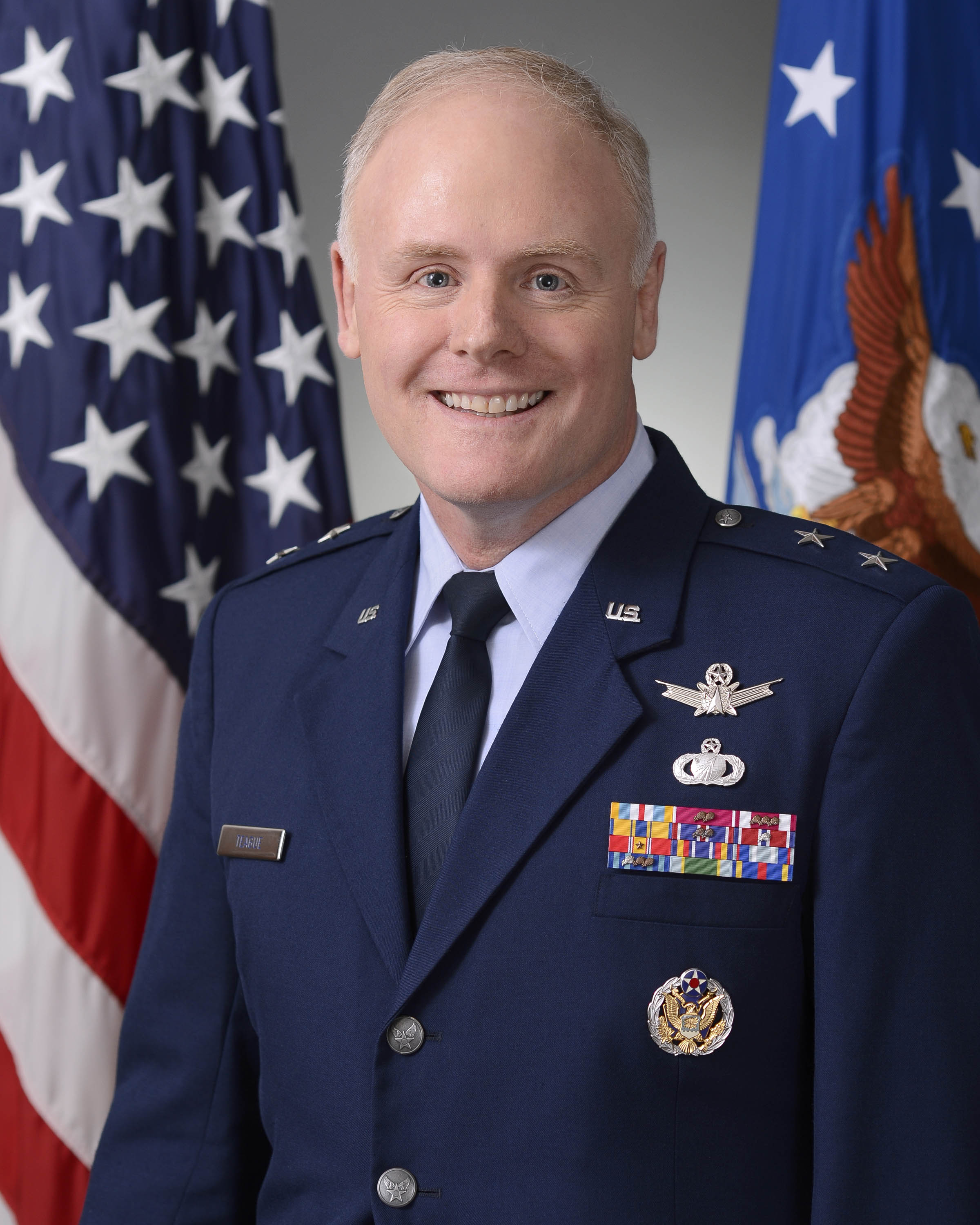
- Official portrait, 2015
- Military career
- Allegiance: United States
- Branch: United States Air Force
- Service years: 1986–2017
- Rank: Major General
- Commands: Infrared Space Systems Directorate; Space-Based Infrared Systems Wing; Space-Based Infrared Systems Space Group
- Awards: Air Force Distinguished Service Medal; Defense Superior Service Medal; Legion of Merit (3)

Roger W. Teague is a retired United States Air Force major general who is the chief executive officer of PredaSAR. In the U.S. Air Force, he last served as the Director of Strategic Plans, Programs, and Analysis of the Air Force Space Command.

Military offices
Preceded by Samuel Greaves	Vice Commander of the Space and Missile Systems Center; 2011–2012	Succeeded by Terrence Feehan
Preceded by Samuel Greaves	Director of Strategic Plans, Programs, and Analysis of the Air Force Space Command; 2012–2014	Succeeded by Ronald Huntley
Preceded by Robert McMurry	Director for Space Programs of the Office of the Assistant Secretary for Acquisition; 2014–2017	Succeeded by Mark Baird
