= Pousette-Dart Band =

Former American soft rock band

- Jon Pousette-Dart Performing at the Plymouth Folk Festival in Plymouth, Massachusetts on July 13, 2008

Background information
- Origin: Cambridge, Massachusetts
- Genres: Soft rock, country rock
- Years active: 1973–1981, 1991, 2008-Present
- Labels: Capitol
- Members: Jon Pousette-Dart; John Troy; John Curtis

The Pousette-Dart Band ([poo-sette]; PDB) was an American soft rock group active in the 1970s and early 1980s. Conceived in 1973 as a string band from Cambridge, Massachusetts, PDB comprised Jon Pousette-Dart, John Troy and John Curtis. With a shift to a more commercially oriented sound and a steady succession of additional personnel, the group went on to record a series of four albums for their label Capitol Records, two of which (Amnesia and Pousette-Dart Band 3) made the Billboard album chart. Their single "For Love" reached #83 on the Billboard singles chart.

Although the band formally broke up in 1981, members reunited in 1991 for a series of concerts, and a "Best Of" album was released in 1994. Since then, collaborations among various former personnel have continued, with original members Pousette-Dart and Troy also launching solo careers.

The song "Fall on Me" from the band's second album Amnesia was featured in the 11th episode of the second season of Lost.

Pousette-Dart is the son of Abstract Expressionist artist Richard Pousette-Dart.

== Discography ==
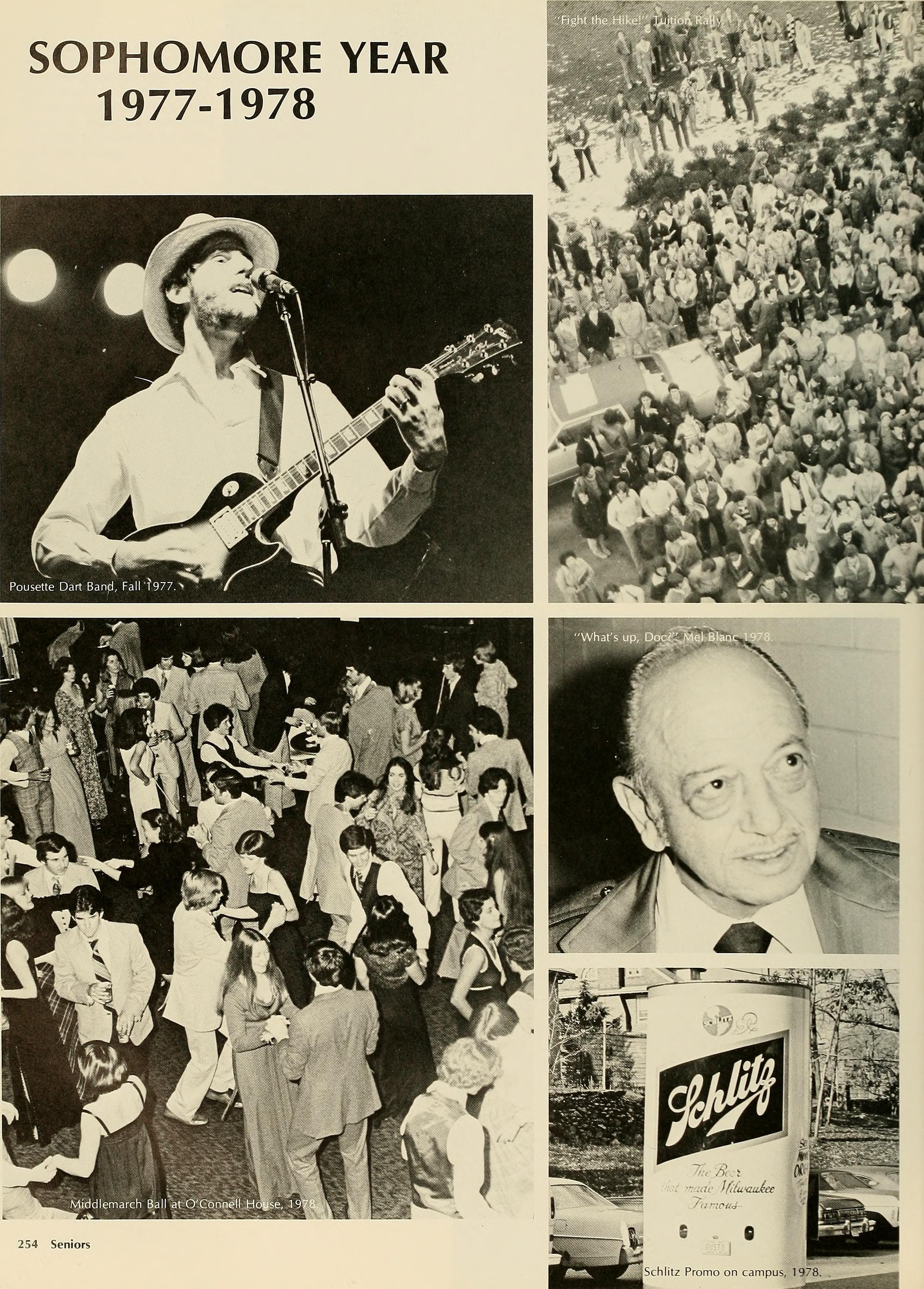
Pousette-Dart Band (top left) in the late 1970s.

Albums

- 1976: Pousette Dart Band
- 1977: Amnesia, US Billboard # 143
- 1978: Pousette-Dart Band 3, US Billboard # 161
- 1979: Never Enough, US Billboard # 203
- 1993: Best of Pousette Dart Band

Singles

- 1976: "What Can I Say"
- 1977: "Fall on Me"
- 1977: "Amnesia"
- 1978: "Stand by Me," US Cash Box # 103
- 1979: "For Love," US Billboard # 83
- 1979: "Hallelujah I'm a Bum"
