= Ronald Huntley =

U.S. Air Force general

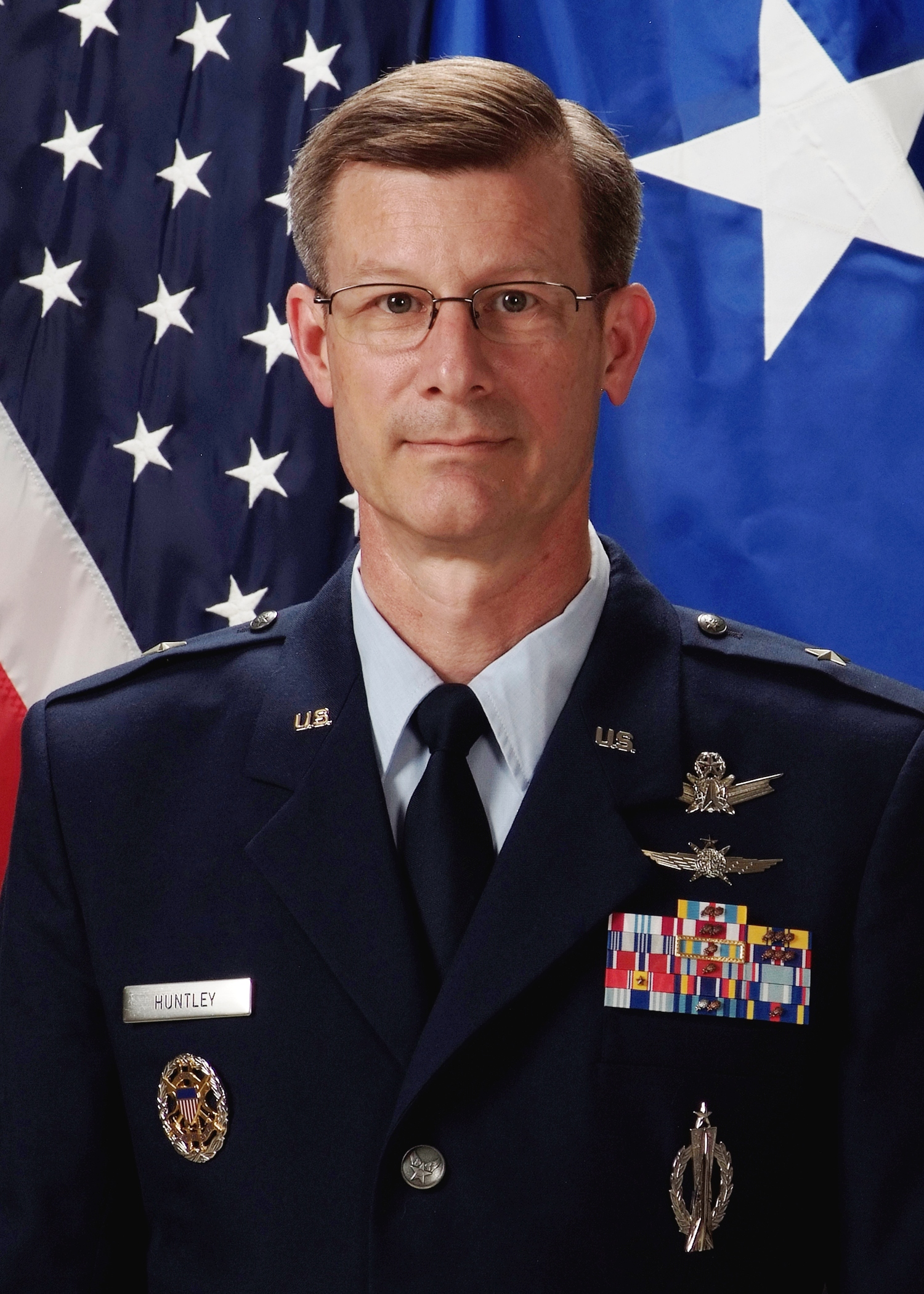
- Official portrait, 2014
- Military career
- Allegiance: United States
- Branch: United States Air Force
- Service years: 1983–2016
- Rank: Brigadier General
- Commands: Aerospace Data Facility-Colorado; Network Operations Group, NRO; 4th Space Operations Squadron
- Awards: Defense Superior Service Medal (3); Defense Meritorious Service Medal

Ronald L. Huntley is a retired United States Air Force brigadier general. He has been the vice president for national security space at Peraton since May 2021. Before retiring from the Air Force in March 2016, he served as the director of financial management and comptroller at the Air Force Space Command.

Military offices
Preceded by Stephen Denker	Commander of Aerospace Data Facility-Colorado; 2011–2012	Succeeded by B. Chance Saltzman
Preceded by Roger Teague	Director of Strategic Plans, Programs, and Analysis of the Air Force Space Command; 2014	Succeeded by Terrence Feehan
Preceded by ???	Director of Financial Management and Comptroller of the Air Force Space Command; 2014–2016	Succeeded by Trent H. Edwards
