= Jason Cranford Teague =

Web designer and author

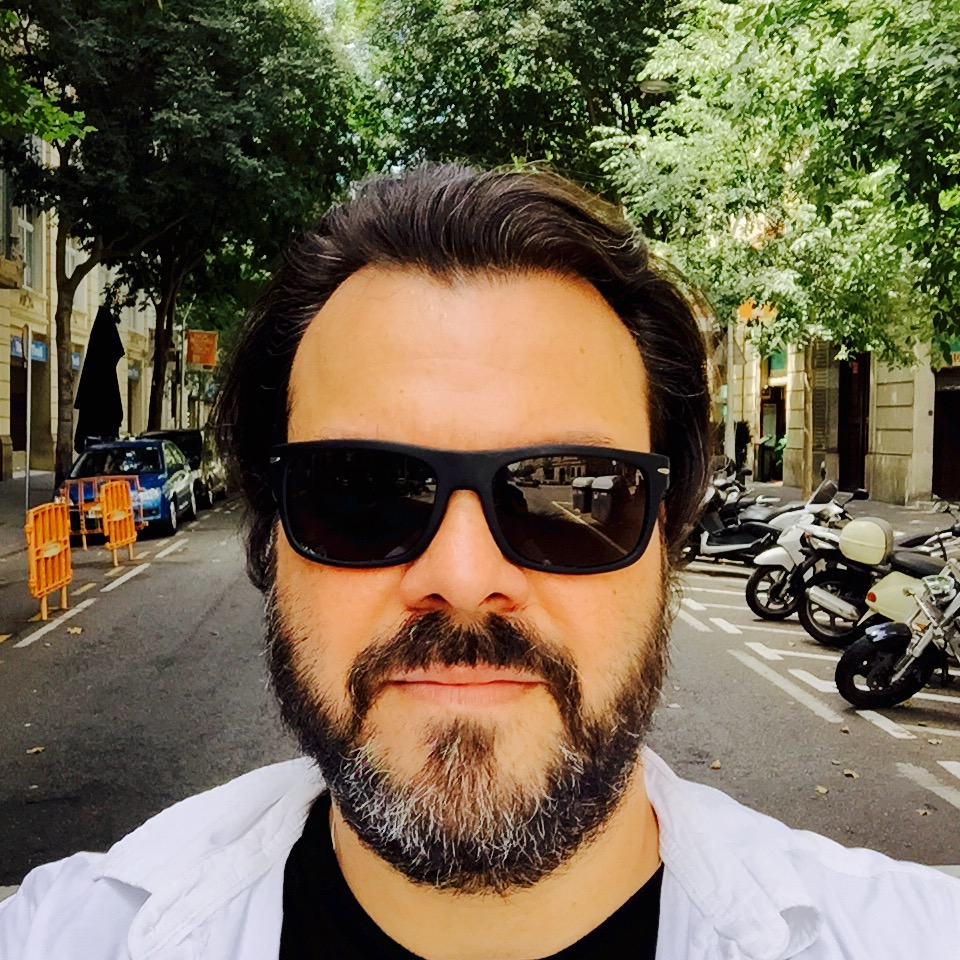
Jason in Barcelona for WebVisions

Jason Cranford Teague is a web designer and author. He designed Computer-Mediated Communications Magazine, the first online magazine, in 1994.

He is best known for his books CSS3 Visual Quickstart (2013) and Fluid Web Typography (2012).

Cranford Teague started as a web designer in 1994. Notable clients include EPA, IRS, Sargento, USDA, Aspen Institute, Marriott, Bank of America, Cisco, Coca-Cola, Virgin Group, CNN, Kodak, and WebMD.

== Books published ==
Teague has written several books and articles about web design and media. His books include the best selling DHTML and CSS for the World Wide Web (originally 1999, fifth printing 2013), Final Cut Pro 4 and the Art of Filmmaking (2004), Photoshop at Your Fingertips (2004), and Speaking In Styles (2009).

=== Published ===
- CSS3 Visual Quickstart, 6th edition
- Fluid Web Typography: A Guide
- Speaking In Styles: A CSS Primer for Web Designers
- CSS3 Visual Quickstart, 5th edition
- CSS, DHTML, & Ajax: Visual Quickstart Guide, 4th
- DHTML & CSS Advanced

=== Out of print ===
- Photoshop at Your Fingertips, 2nd edition
- Photoshop at Your Fingertips
- Final Cut Express Essentials
- SVG for Web Designers
- Final Cut Pro and the Art of Filmmaking, 2nd Edition
- Final Cut Pro and the Art of Filmmaking
- DHTML & CSS Visual QuickStart, 3rd edition
- DHTML & CSS Visual QuickStart, 2nd edition
- DHTML Visual Quickstart
- How to program HTML Frames: Interface Design and Javascript

== Articles published ==
Teague has contributed numerous articles to Apple Developers Connection, Computer Arts Magazine, and Macworld Magazine. He writes regularly about technology, politics, and culture on webbedENVIRONMENTS. He has also appeared on TechTV's The Screen Savers.
