= Amnesia (Pousette-Dart Band album) =

Studio album by Pousette-Dart Band
- Released: 1977
- Genre: Soft rock
- Length: 30:08
- Label: Capitol
- Producer: Norbert Putnam

Pousette-Dart Band chronology
| The Pousette-Dart Band (1976) | Amnesia (1977) | Pousette-Dart Band 3 (1978) |

Professional ratings
Review scores
| Source | Rating |
|---|---|
| Allmusic | 2.5/5 stars |

Amnesia is the second album by the rock band Pousette-Dart Band, released in 1977. The song "Fall on Me" was featured in the 11th episode of the second season of Lost.

== Track listing ==
All songs composed by Jon Pousette-Dart except where noted.

1. "County Line" (John Curtis, Jon Pousette-Dart) – 3:28
2. "Fall on Me" – 2:25
3. "Amnesia" – 3:11
4. "I Think I Know" – 3:11
5. "May You Dance" – 3:20
6. "I Don't Know Why" – 3:06
7. "Winterness" – 3:03
8. "Who's That Knocking" (John Curtis) – 2:54
9. "Listen to the Spirit" – 3:30
10. "Yaicha" – 2:00

== Personnel ==
- Jon Pousette-Dart - vocals, acoustic and electric guitar, slide guitar
- John Curtis - electric and acoustic guitar, mandolin, banjo, vocals
- John Folsom Troy - bass guitar, vocals
- Norbert Putnam - synthesizer, Fender Rhodes
- Michael Utley, Bobby Emmons - keyboards
- Kenneth Buttrey, Jeff Teague, Allison Cook - drums, percussion
- Farrell Morris - percussion
- Harvey Thompson - tenor saxophone
- Billy Puett - flute
- Ginger Holladay, Janie Fricke, Lea Jane Berinati - backing vocals

== Chart positions ==
| Chart (1977) | Peak position |
|---|---|
| U.S. Billboard 200 | 143 |

The album drew a mostly negative retrospective review from David Cleary of Allmusic, who awarded the album 2.5 stars. He called it "bland" and the lyrics "noncommittal", and compared it to The Eagles and James Taylor. He said that "Yaicha" was "easily the album's best song," and "a brief and lovely singer-songwriter number with an attractive melody and intriguing chord changes."[1]
