= Todd Benson =

American Space Force general (b. 1977)

- Official portrait, 2026
- Born: c. 1977 (age 48–49); Adna, Washington, U.S.
- Education: United States Air Force Academy (BS); Embry–Riddle Aeronautical University (MS); Air Command and Staff College (MMOAS)
- Military career
- Allegiance: United States
- Branch: United States Air Force: United States Space Force
- Service years: 1999–2021 (Air Force): 2021–present (Space Force)
- Rank: Brigadier General
- Commands: United States Space Forces – Central; Space Delta 21; 2nd Space Operations Squadron
- Conflicts: Iraq War; War in Afghanistan; War against the Islamic State; 2026 Iran war

Todd James Benson (born c. 1977) is an American brigadier general who serves as the commander of the United States Space Forces – Central since 2025. He previously served as the director of strategy and requirements of the United States Space Force from 2024 to 2025.

Benson was commissioned from the United States Air Force Academy in 1999 and served in space and intercontinental ballistic missile units. His commands have included the 2nd Space Operations Squadron, from 2014 to 2016, and Space Delta 21, from 2019 to 2021. He also served as Director of Space Forces at the United States Air Forces Central in 2020, during which time he led Space Force personnel in the branch's first foreign deployment. He later served as Director of Requirements of the Space Force from 2021 to 2024. He was deployed for the Iraq War, the war in Afghanistan, and the war against the Islamic State during his career.

As the commander of Space Forces Central, Benson has participated in operations during the 2026 Iran war.

== Early life and education ==
Todd James Benson was commissioned from the United States Air Force Academy in 1999, where he received a Bachelor of Science degree, and a minor in the Arabic language.

== Military career ==
From August 1999 to July 2000, Benson was assistant coach of the rifle team and a physical education instructor in boxing/SCUBA at the Air Force Academy. He underwent Intercontinental Ballistic Missile Initial Qualification Training from July 2000 to April 2001, at Vandenberg Air Force Base, California. He then served in the 90th Space Wing at F.E. Warren AFB, Wyoming, from April 2001 to May 2005 in several positions, which culminated in him serving as an ICBM Senior Instructor Crew Commander. In 2003, he received a Master of Science degree in aeronautical science from Embry–Riddle Aeronautical University, and in 2004, he completed the Squadron Officer School. During his career, he was deployed for the Iraq War with United States Forces Iraq.

Benson was a Space Based Infrared System Flight Commander at the 2nd Space Warning Squadron, at Buckley AFB, Colorado, from May 2005 to March 2007. From then until June 2008, he was the executive officer of the 460th Space Wing at Buckley AFB. Benson served there in other roles until June 2010, the final of which was as Chief Mission Ops Branch. He was Chief Missile Warning Space Section at the Directorate of Requirements, Headquarters Air Force Space Command, at Peterson Air Force Base, Colorado, from July 2010 to February 2011. He was executive officer to the Director of Requirements from March 2011 until June 2012. Benson was a student at the Air Command and Staff College from June 2012 to June 2013, where he received a Master of Military Operational Art and Science degree and was a distinguished graduate.

Benson served as Director of Operations of the Space Operations Squadron at Aerospace Data Facility-Southwest, New Mexico, from July 2013 to June 2014. He was then the commander of the 2nd Space Operations Squadron at Schriever Air Force Base, Colorado, from July 2014 to June 2016. Benson was a national security fellow at Harvard University's Kennedy School from July 2016 to June 2017, and then Division Chief, Space and Missile Defense Policy, on the Joint Staff at the Pentagon until July 2019. He graduated from the Joint Professional Military Education II Course at the Joint Forces Staff College in 2019. In July 2019, he became commander of Space Delta 21 at Aerospace Data Facility-East, Virginia. In June 2020, Benson became Director of Space Forces at United States Air Forces Central (AFCENT).

In September 2020, Benson, having been transferred to the newly formed United States Space Force, led 20 personnel to be forward deployed at Al Udeid Air Base in Qatar, which became the branch's first foreign deployment. There, they were involved in Operation Inherent Resolve during the war against the Islamic State, and Operation Freedom's Sentinel during the war in Afghanistan. He remained in that role until December 2020. Benson relinquished command of Space Delta 21 in July 2021, and became Director of Requirements at Headquarters Space Force at the Pentagon, until March 2024. He later served as Director of Strategy and Requirements from March 2024 to July 2025. In June 2025, Benson was nominated and confirmed for promotion to brigadier general.

He took command of United States Space Forces – Central (SPACECENT) on 15 August 2025, in its first change of command ceremony. From the beginning of the Iran war on 28 February 2026, Benson has led SPACECENT during Operation Epic Fury, which was tasked with establishing space superiority over Iran. During the war, SPACECENT personnel are both forward deployed in the region and have a presence at United States Central Command facilities at MacDill Air Force Base, Florida, and Shaw Air Force Base, South Carolina.

== Dates of promotion ==
Rank	Branch	Date
Second Lieutenant	Air Force	June 2, 1999
First Lieutenant	Air Force	June 2, 2001
Captain	Air Force	June 2, 2003
Major	Air Force	January 1, 2009
Lieutenant Colonel	Air Force	November 1, 2013
Colonel	Air Force	March 1, 2019
Colonel	Space Force	~September 30, 2020
Brigadier General	Space Force	June 30, 2025

Military offices
Preceded by Robert Hutt	Director of Space Forces of the United States Air Forces Central Command; 2020	Succeeded by Robert Schreiner
Preceded by ???	Commander of Space Delta 21; 2019–2021	Succeeded by Nikki Frankino
Preceded by Christopher Fernengel	Director of Strategy and Requirements of the United States Space Force; 2021–2025	Succeeded by Peter C. Mastro
Preceded by Christopher S. Putnam	Commander of the United States Space Forces – Central; 2025–present	Incumbent
