= United States Space Forces – Central =

- USSPACEFOR-CENT emblem
- Founded: 2 December 2022; 47 months
- Country: United States
- Branch: United States Space Force
- Type: Component field command
- Role: Space operations
- Size: 28 personnel
- Part of: United States Central Command
- Headquarters: MacDill Air Force Base, Florida
- Engagements: 2026 Iran war

Commanders
- Commander: Brig Gen Todd Benson
- Deputy Commander: Col Frank Brooks
- Command Senior Enlisted Leader: CMSgt Christopher J Gracey

Insignia
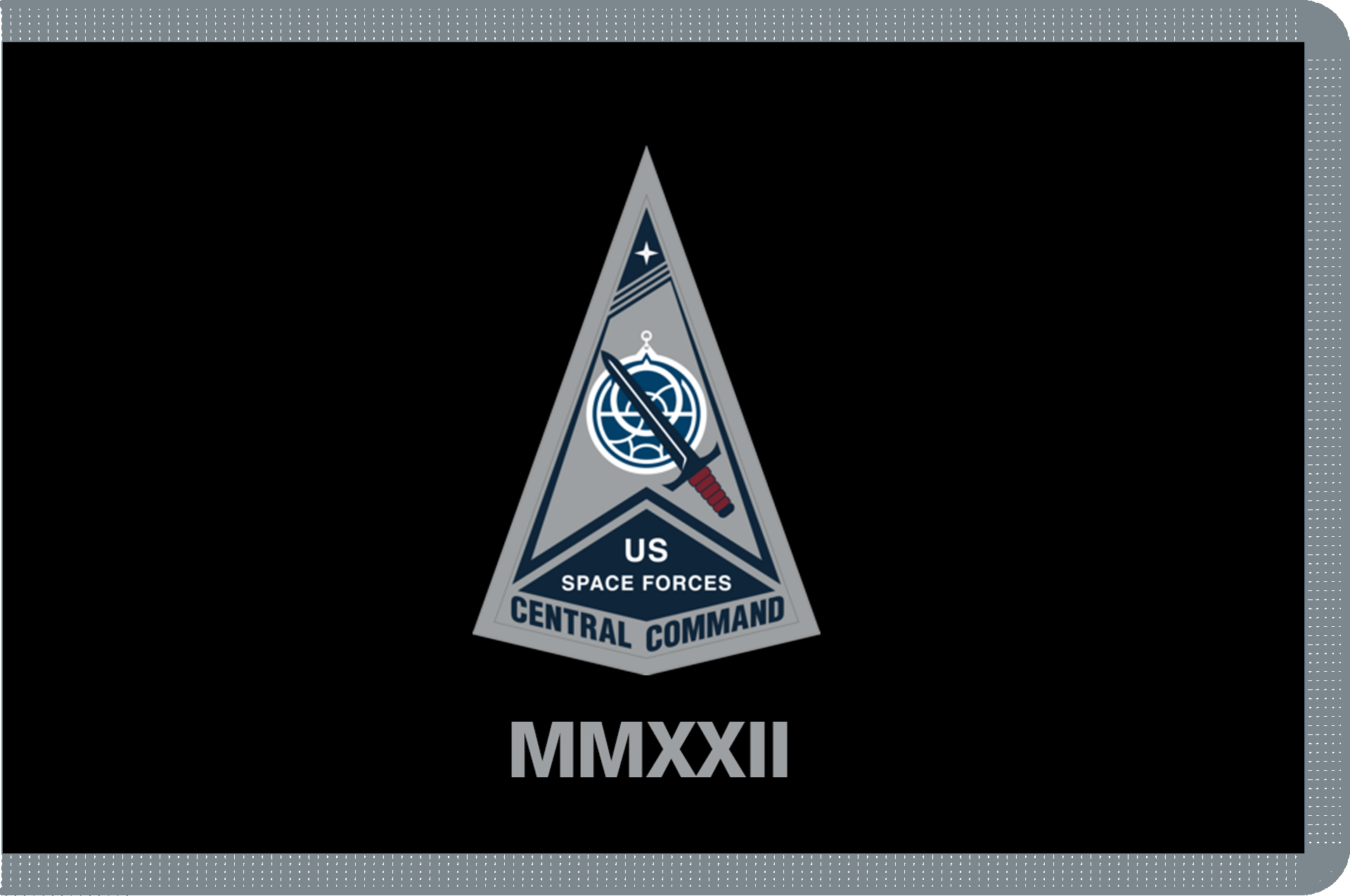
- Flag of US Space Forces - Central

The United States Space Forces – Central (USSPACEFOR-CENT) is the United States Space Force component field command to the United States Central Command. Headquartered at MacDill Air Force Base, Florida, it plans, coordinates, supports, and conducts employment of space operations across the full range of military operations, including security cooperation, in support of the combatant command's objectives. It was activated on 2 December 2022.

== History ==
=== Director of Space Forces, U.S. Air Forces Central ===
USSPACEFOR-CENT's presence in the United States Central Command traces back to the director of space forces (DIRSPACEFOR) construct before the establishment of the Space Force. When the Space Force was still Air Force Space Command, there would be a space operations officer called the DIRSPACEFOR in every air service component command that would advise the air component commander on matters relating to space operations. As such, there was a director of space forces assigned to United States Air Forces Central.

==== List of directors of space forces ====
Assistant Combined Air Operations Center Director for Space and Information Warfare

1. Brig Gen Richard E. Webber, October 2001 – March 2002

Directors of Space Forces

- Col Teresa A. H. Djuric, April 2004 – August 2004
- Col Michael Carey, October 2004 – March 2005
- Col Jack Weinstein, ~March 2005 – ~June 2005
- Col J. Kevin McLaughlin, October 2005 - February 2006
- Col Martin Whelan, January 2006 – June 2006
- Col John E. Hyten, May 2006 – October 2006
- Col John W. Raymond, September 2006 – January 2007
- Col Cary C. Chun, January 2007 – June 2007
- Col John Riordan, ~June 2007 – ~2008
- Col David D. Thompson, June 2009 – June 2010
- Col David J. Buck, May 2010 – May 2011
- Col Clinton Crosier, May 2011 – July 2012
- Col Keith W. Balts, May 2012 – May 2013
- Col Jennifer Moore, ~May 2013 – April 2014
- Col Douglas Schiess, April 2014 – April 2015
- Col Michael S. Hough, April 2015 – April 2016
- Col Michael Jackson, April 2016 – April 2017
- Col Dewitt Morgan, August 2017 – July 2018
- Col Jacob Middleton Jr., January 2019 – July 2019
- Col Robert Hutt, January 2020 – June 2020
- Col Todd Benson, June 2020 – December 2020
- Col Robert Schreiner, December 2020 – June 2021
- Col Anthony Mastalir, July 2021 – April 2022
- Col Christopher S. Putman, March 2022 – 2 December 2022

=== Establishment ===
Initial plans for establishment of Space Force component field commands started in 2021 when then Colonel Anthony Mastalir was assigned as director of space forces at the Ninth Air Force and stand up the USSPACEFOR-CENT. USSPACEFOR-CENT was supposed to be the first Space Force component field command. In November 2021, Secretary Frank Kendall III approved the creation of Space Force elements in U.S. European Command, U.S. Central Command, and U.S. Indo-Pacific Command, but establishing those elements as component commands required Joint Chiefs of Staff approval.

By May 2022, plans were changed to first establish the United States Space Forces Indo-Pacific (USSPACEFOR-INDOPAC) because China was the pacing threat. Mastalir then returned to Vandenberg and was replaced by Colonel Christopher S. Putman as director of space forces. On 22 November 2022, USSPACEFOR-INDOPAC was established and Mastalir took the helm as its first commander.

Prior to the establishment of USSPACEFOR-INDOPAC, General David D. Thompson announced that the USSPACEFOR-CENT would be established shortly after the establishment of USSPACEFOR-INDOPAC. On 2 December 2022, USSPACEFOR-CENT was established. It is initially composed of 28 personnel and Putman serves as its first commander.

On March 12, 2024, the component field command established the U.S. Space Forces Central Combat Detachment 3-1 (CDet 3–1), tasked with providing command and control for SPACECENT teams in the region that provide space-based capabilities such as missile warning detection, ensuring reliable communications and GPS.

=== 2026 Iran war ===
The chief of space operations, General B. Chance Saltzman, said in April 2026 that Space Forces guardians have been forward deployed inside the theater for the 2026 Iran war, and confirmed that Space Forces Central has been involved in the operation from the start, working to achieve space superiority over Iran.

== Combat Detachment 3-1 (CDet 3-1) ==
Commanders

- Lt Col Deane L. Lake, March 2024 -
- Lt Col Guy “SILVERBACK” Epps, Dates
- Lt Col Dustin Guidry, Dates
- Lt Col Claudia Harris, Dates

== Heraldry ==
Emblems of United States Space Forces – Central and its predecessors
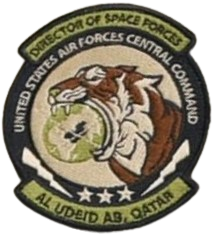
Director of Space Forces, United States Air Forces Central Command emblem (until 2022)

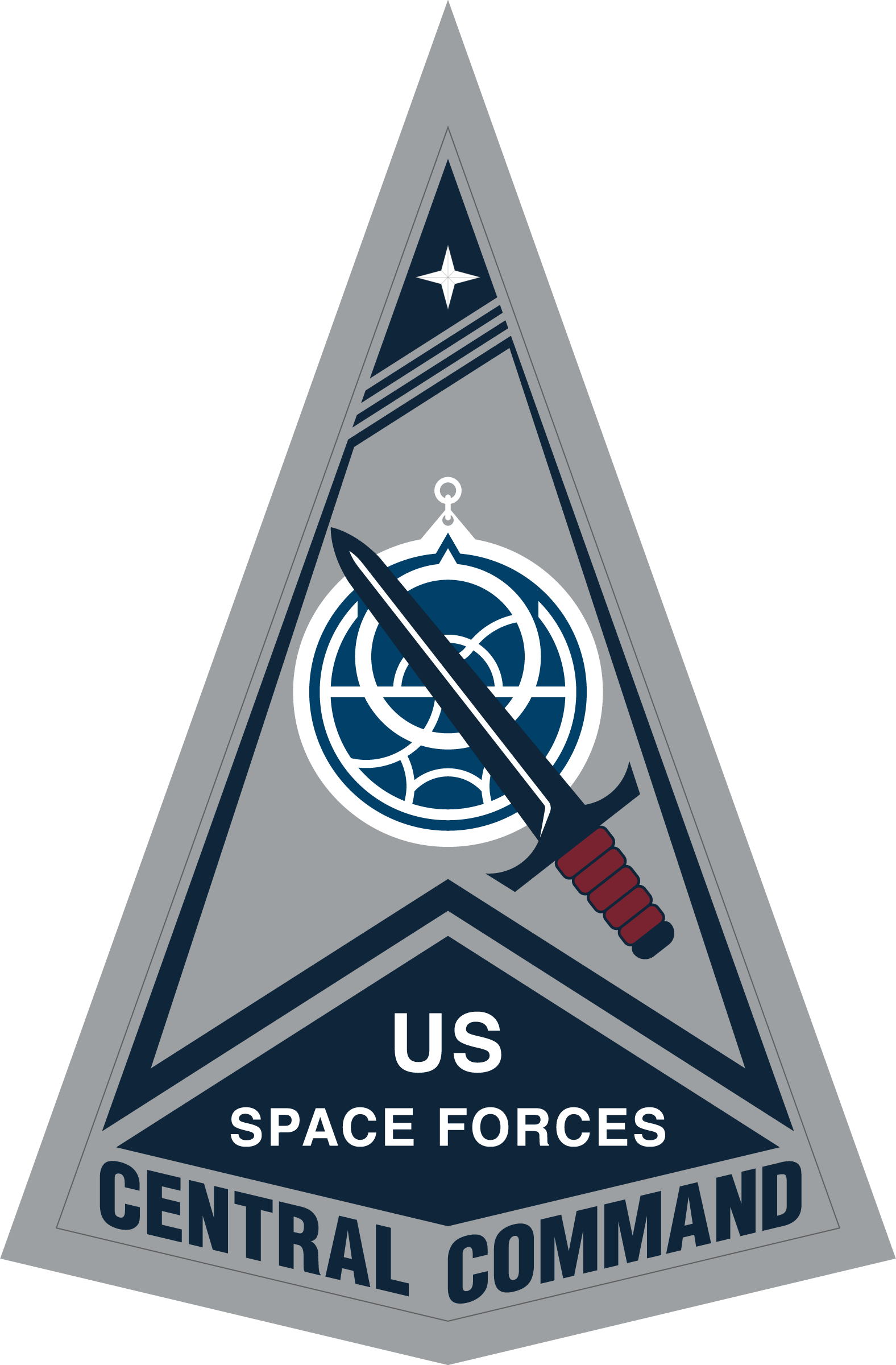
United States Space Forces – Central (2022–present)

=== Emblem ===
The USSPACEFOR-CENT emblem has four elements:

- The four-pointed Polaris taken from the Space Force seal symbolizes the Guardian Commitment and the service's four values: character, connection, commitment, and courage.
- The astrolabe, an early scientific instrument prominent in Middle Eastern antiquity, represents "terrestrial forces' critical dependence on space capabilities and pays homage to the use of the space-based Global Positioning System during Operation Desert Storm in the Gulf War.
- The broadsword, an element taken from the U.S. Central Command emblem, represents USSPACEFOR-CENT's readiness to fight as "Guardians of CENTCOM".

== List of commanders ==
| No. | Commander | | Term | | | Ref |
| No. | Portrait | Name | Took office | Left office | Term length | Ref |
|---|---|---|---|---|---|---|
| 1 | Christopher S. Putnam | Colonel; Christopher S. Putnam (born c. 1970) | 2 December 2022 | 15 August 2025 | 3 years, 347 days | |
| 2 | Todd Benson | Brigadier General; Todd Benson (born c. 1977) | 15 August 2025 | Incumbent | 1 year, 91 days | |

== See also ==
- United States Central Command
- United States Space Force
- Ninth Air Force
