= Aerospace Data Facility-East =

Reconnaissance satellite ground station on the US East Coast

- Part of Fort Belvoir
- Fairfax County, Virginia
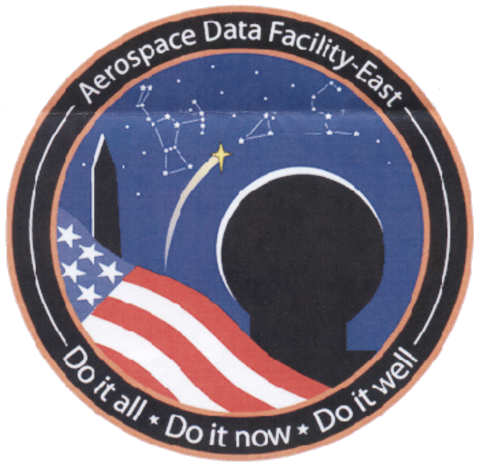

Site information
- Type: Satellite ground station
- Owner: United States Army
- Controlled by: National Reconnaissance Office

Location
- Coordinates: 38°44′10″N 77°9′30″W

Site history
- In use: 1977–present

Garrison information
- Current commander: Col. Nicholas Martin

Aerospace Data Facility-East (ADF-E), also known as Area 58 and formerly known as Defense Communications Electronics Evaluation and Testing Activity (DCEETA), is one of three satellite ground stations operated by the National Reconnaissance Office (NRO) in the continental United States. Located at Fort Belvoir, Virginia, the facility directs reconnaissance satellites and disseminates their intelligence to other U.S. government agencies.

== Function ==
ADF East is co-located with elements of the National Geospatial-Intelligence Agency, the agency that operates U.S. space-based imagery constellation. Authors James Bamford and Jeffrey Richelson report that the site manages the KH-11 imagery spacecraft and the Lacrosse radar imaging spacecraft. NASA engineer Ken Young, who visited the site as part of a plan for KH-11 to photograph STS-1, described its equipment as far more sophisticated than at his agency.

== History ==
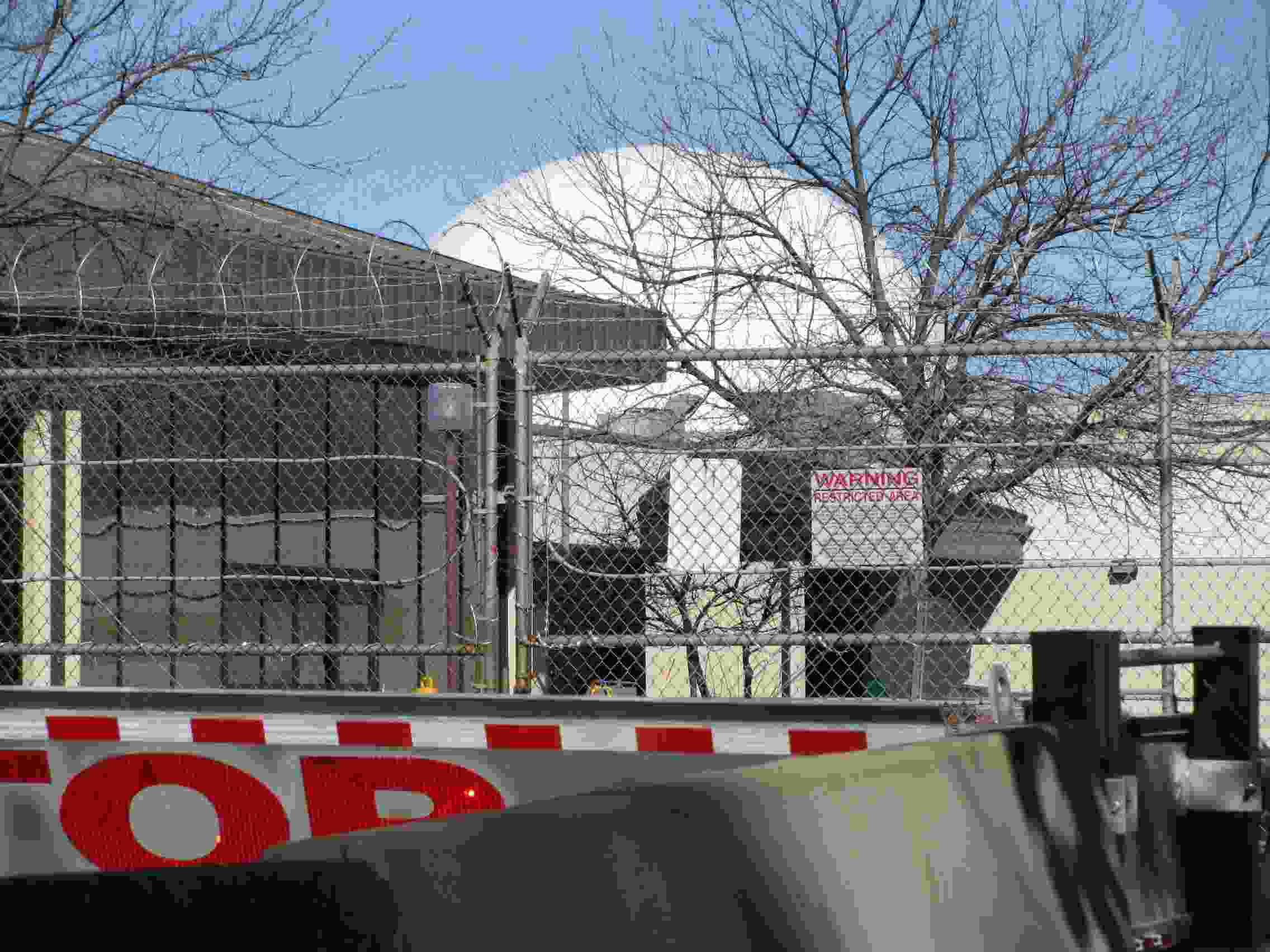
The facility's south radome

=== First use ===
The first documented use of material downloaded at ADF East was on January 21, 1977, when the acting director of Central Intelligence E. Henry Knoche delivered reconnaissance satellite photographs that had been downloaded at ADF East to U.S. President Jimmy Carter.

=== Y2K ===
On the morning of January 1, 2000, a technical glitch caused by the Y2K bug limited ADF East to 70 percent of its planned imagery satellite coverage. At a press conference on January 4, United States Deputy Secretary of Defense John Hamre stated, "The problem wasn't with the satellite system – they were under positive control at all times. The problem was on the ground in the processing station."

=== Declassification ===
The facility was declassified by the U.S. government in 2008.

On October 15, 2008, the NRO declassified its three Mission Ground Stations: ADF-East, ADF-Colorado, and ADF-Southwest.

== List of commanders ==
- Col B. Edwin Wilson, September 2006 – April 2008
- Col Anthony J. Cotton, April 2008 – July 2019
- Col Todd J. Benson, July 2019 – July 2021
- Col Nikki Frankino, July 2021–June 2023
- Col Nicholas Martin

== See also ==
- Aerospace Data Facility-Colorado
- Aerospace Data Facility-Southwest
- Pine Gap
- RAF Menwith Hill
- Spy satellite
