= Robert W. Davis (general) =

U.S. Space Force general officer

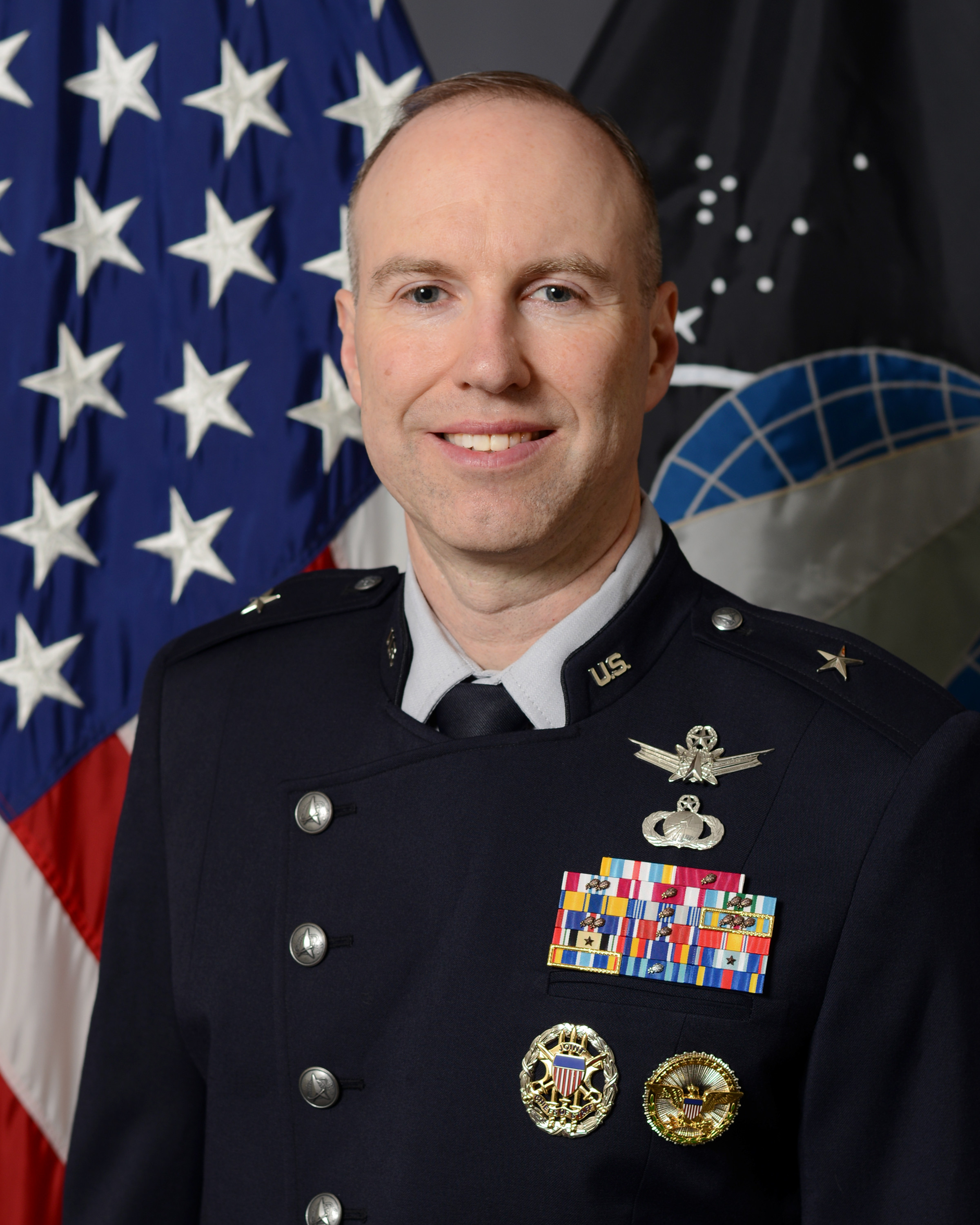
- Born: c. 1977 (age 48–49)
- Education: University of Portland (BS); University of New Mexico (MBA)
- Military career
- Allegiance: United States
- Branch: United States Air Force: United States Space Force
- Service years: 2000–2021 (Air Force): 2021–present (Space Force)
- Rank: Brigadier General
- Commands: Space Sensing Directorate, SSC; University of New Mexico

Robert W. Davis (born c. 1977) is a United States Space Force brigadier general who serves as a deputy director for operations of the Joint Staff. He previously served as the program executive officer for space sensing for Space Systems Command.

In 2025, Davis was nominated and confirmed for promotion to brigadier general.

== Military career ==
1. July 2000–July 2003, Accessories Flight Commander, Propulsion Flight Commander, 58th Maintenance Squadron, Sortie Support Flight Commander, 551st Special Operations Squadron, Sortie Generation Flight Commander, 550th Special Operations Squadron, and then 550th Aircraft Maintenance Unit Officer in Charge, 58th Aircraft Maintenance Unit, Kirtland Air Force Base, N.M.
2. July 2003–July 2006, Flight Commander, Chief, Launch Readiness, and then Chief, Launch and Integration, National Reconnaissance Office Operations Squadron, Schriever AFB, Colo.
3. July 2006–May 2007, Air Force Intern, Office of the Under Secretary of Defense for Acquisition, Technology, and Logistics, Air Warfare Division, and then Junior Military Assistant for the Deputy Secretary of Defense Military Assistant, the Pentagon, Arlington, Va.
4. May 2007–September 2007, Personal Security Coordination Center, Multi-National Forces-Iraq, Baghdad, Iraq
5. October 2007–June 2010, Deputy, then Chief, Delta Payload Launch Integration and Operations, Office of Space Launch, National Reconnaissance Office, Chantilly, Va.
6. July 2010–June 2012, Chief, Satellite Operations Engineering Branch, Operating Location-Alpha, 3rd Space Experimentation Squadron, Bolling AFB, Washington, D.C.
7. June 2012–June 2014, Chief, Space Control Science and Technology Section, and then Chief, Space Control Mission Integration Branch, Directorate of Requirements, Headquarters Air Force Space Command, Peterson AFB, Colo.
8. June 2014–July 2016, Materiel Leader, Imagery Spacecraft Program Manager, Electro-Optical Systems Program Office, Imagery Intelligence Directorate, National Reconnaissance Office, Chantilly, Va.
9. August 2016–June 2017, Student, Eisenhower School of National Security and Resource Strategy, National Defense University, Fort Lesley J. McNair, Washington, D.C.
10. June 2017–June 2021, Chief, Department of Defense Special Access Program Policy and Governance, and then Deputy Directory, Department of Defense Special Access Program Central Office, Office of the Secretary of Defense, the Pentagon, Arlington, Va.
11. June 2021–June 2022, Senior Materiel Leader, Acquisitions Delta Strategic Satellite Communications, Military Communications and Position, Navigation, and Timing Directorate, Space Systems Command, Los Angeles AFB, Calif.
12. June 2022–July 2025, Space Force Program Executive Officer for Space Sensing and Director, Space Sensing Directorate, Space Systems Command, Los Angeles AFB, Calif.
13. July 2025–present, deputy director for Operations, Joint Staff J-3, the Pentagon, Arlington, Va.

== Dates of promotion ==
| Rank | Branch | Date |
|---|---|---|
| Second Lieutenant | Air Force | May 28, 2000 |
| First Lieutenant | Air Force | May 28, 2000 |
| Captain | Air Force | May 28, 2004 |
| Major | Air Force | December 1, 2009 |
| Lieutenant Colonel | Air Force | December 1, 2013 |
| Colonel | Air Force | January 1, 2020 |
| Colonel | Space Force | ~June 24, 2021 |
| Brigadier General | Space Force | July 18, 2025 |

Military offices
| Preceded by ??? | Senior Materiel Leader of the Strategic Satellite Communications Acquisitions Delta; 2021–2022 | Succeeded by Albert J. Ashby |
| Preceded by Brian Denaro | Program Executive Officer for Space Sensing for Space Systems Command; 2022–2025 | Succeeded by Leroy Brown Jr. |
| Preceded by Robert Schreiner | Deputy Director for Operations of the Joint Staff; 2025–present | Incumbent |
