= Robert Schreiner =

U.S. Space Force general officer

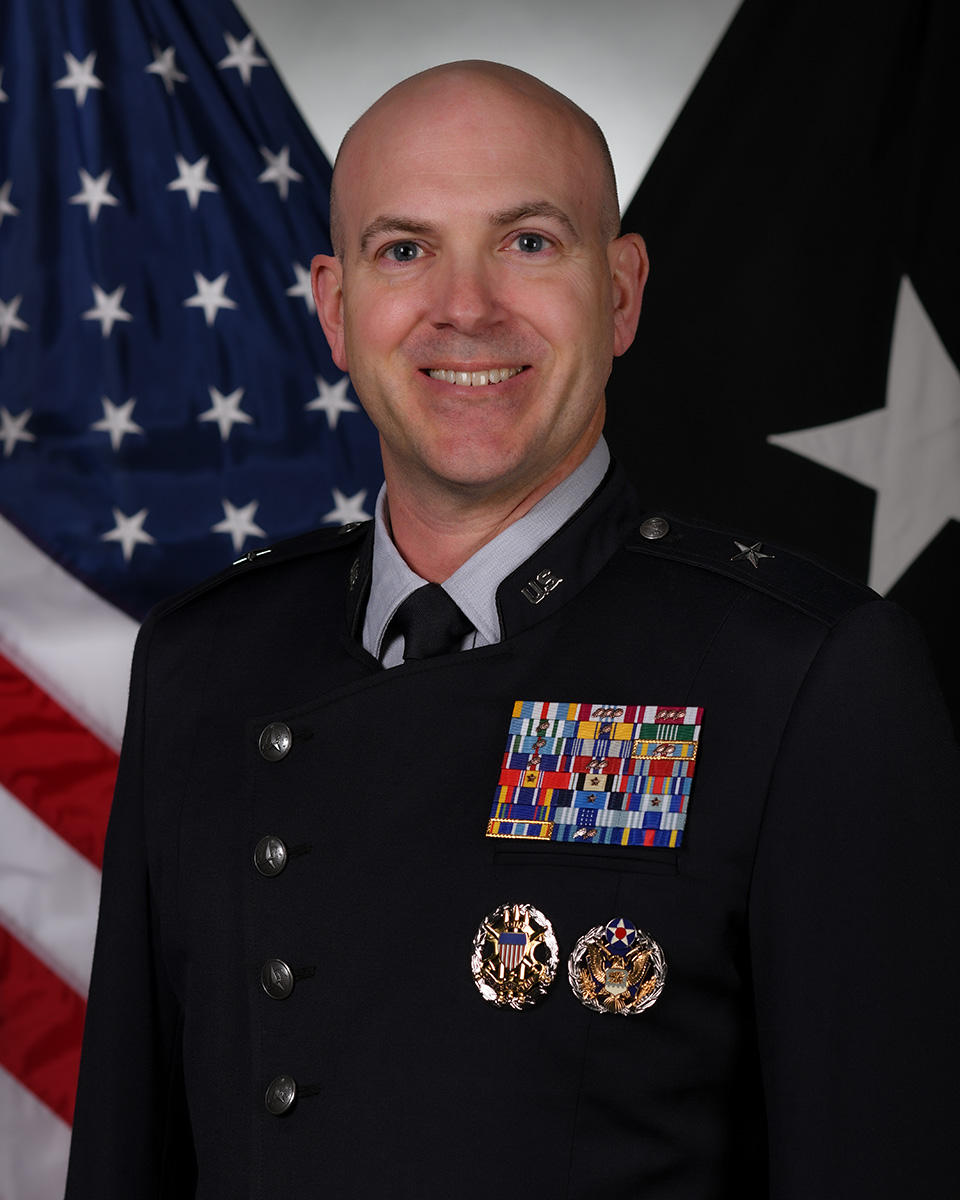
- Official portrait, 2026
- Born: c. 1976 (age 49–50); Chicago, Illinois, U.S.
- Alma mater: United States Air Force Academy (BS)
- Spouse: Nicole
- Military career
- Allegiance: United States
- Branch: United States Air Force: United States Space Force
- Service years: 1998–2020 (Air Force): 2020–present (Space Force)
- Rank: Brigadier General
- Commands: United States Space Forces – Northern; Space Delta 20; Aerospace Data Facility-Colorado; AFE Operations Support Squadron

Robert Joseph Schreiner (born c. 1976) is a United States Space Force brigadier general who served as commander of Space Delta 20 and Aerospace Data Facility-Colorado. He also served as director of space forces of the Ninth Air Force. He now serves as the senior liaison officer to the United States Northern Command and United States Strategic Command.

In 2024, Schreiner was nominated and promoted to brigadier general.

== Military career ==
Schreiner commissioned into the United States Air Force in 1998 after graduating from the United States Air Force Academy. While serving as the National Reconnaissance Office representative to the United States Space Command, he was deployed to serve as director of space forces of the Ninth Air Force.

On August 12, 2021, Schreiner took command of Aerospace Data Facility-Colorado. As ADF-C commander, he leads a 4,000 member, joint-agency, multi-national, and multi-mission intelligence operations center conducting collection, analysis, reporting, and dissemination of vital intelligence information in support of defense and other government operations around the world. Additionally, he served as Space Delta 20 commander, responsible for leading Space Force personnel assigned to ADF-C.

In 2020, Schreiner transferred into the United States Space Force. In 2024, he was nominated for promotion to brigadier general.

== Personal life ==
Schreiner is married to Nicole, a Space Force civil servant. Their daughter, Hayley, was awarded as the 2023 Military Child of the Year by Operation Homefront.

== Awards and decorations ==
Schreiner is the recipient of the following awards:

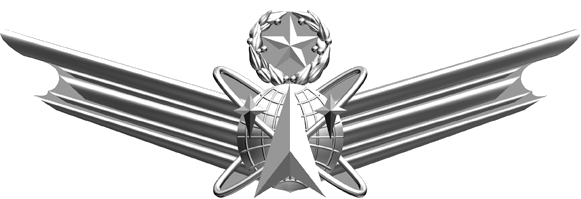
Command Space Operations Badge

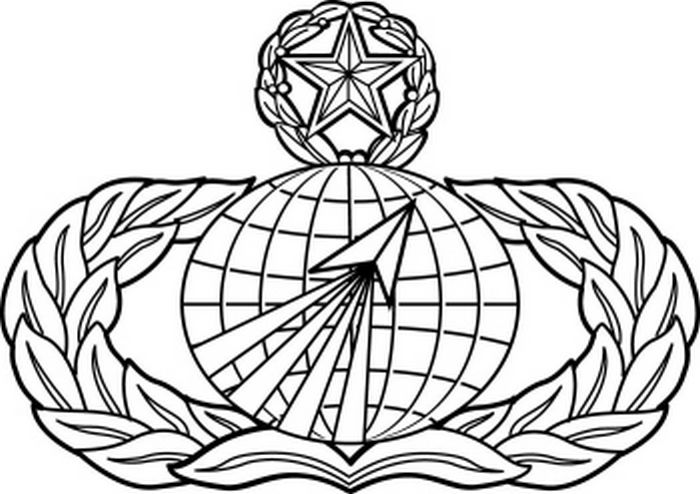

Air Force Master Acquisition and Financial Management Badge

Air Staff Badge

Commander's Insignia

Defense Meritorious Service Medal with three bronze oak leaf clusters
Meritorious Service Medal with three bronze oak leaf clusters
Joint Service Commendation Medal
Air Force Commendation Medal with one bronze oak leaf cluster
Army Commendation Medal
Joint Service Achievement Medal with one bronze oak leaf cluster
Air Force Achievement Medal
Joint Meritorious Unit Award with one bronze oak leaf cluster
Air Force Outstanding Unit Award with one bronze oak leaf cluster
Air Force Organizational Excellence Award with thwo silver oak leaf clusters
Combat Readiness Medal
National Defense Service Medal with one bronze service star
Iraq Campaign Medal with one bronze service star
Global War on Terrorism Expeditionary Medal
Global War on Terrorism Service Medal
Remote Combat Effects Campaign Medal with one bronze service star
Air and Space Campaign Medal with one bronze service star
Air Force Overseas Short Tour Service Ribbon
Air Force Overseas Long Tour Service Ribbon
Air Force Expeditionary Service Ribbon with gold frame
Air Force Longevity Service Award with one silver oak leaf cluster
Air Force Training Ribbon

Military offices
Preceded by Todd J. Benson	Director of Space Forces of the Ninth Air Force; 2020–2021	Succeeded by Anthony Mastalir
New office	National Reconnaissance Office Representative to the United States Space Command; 2019–2021	Succeeded by David G. Hanson
Preceded by Jacob Middleton Jr.	Commander of Space Delta 20 and Aerospace Data Facility-Colorado; 2021–2024	Succeeded by David E. Gallagher
Preceded by Jacob Middleton Jr.	Deputy Director for Operations of the Joint Staff; 2024–2025	Succeeded by Robert W. Davis
New office	Commander of United States Space Forces – Northern; 2026–present	Incumbent
