= United States Space Forces – Northern =

United States Space Forces Northern
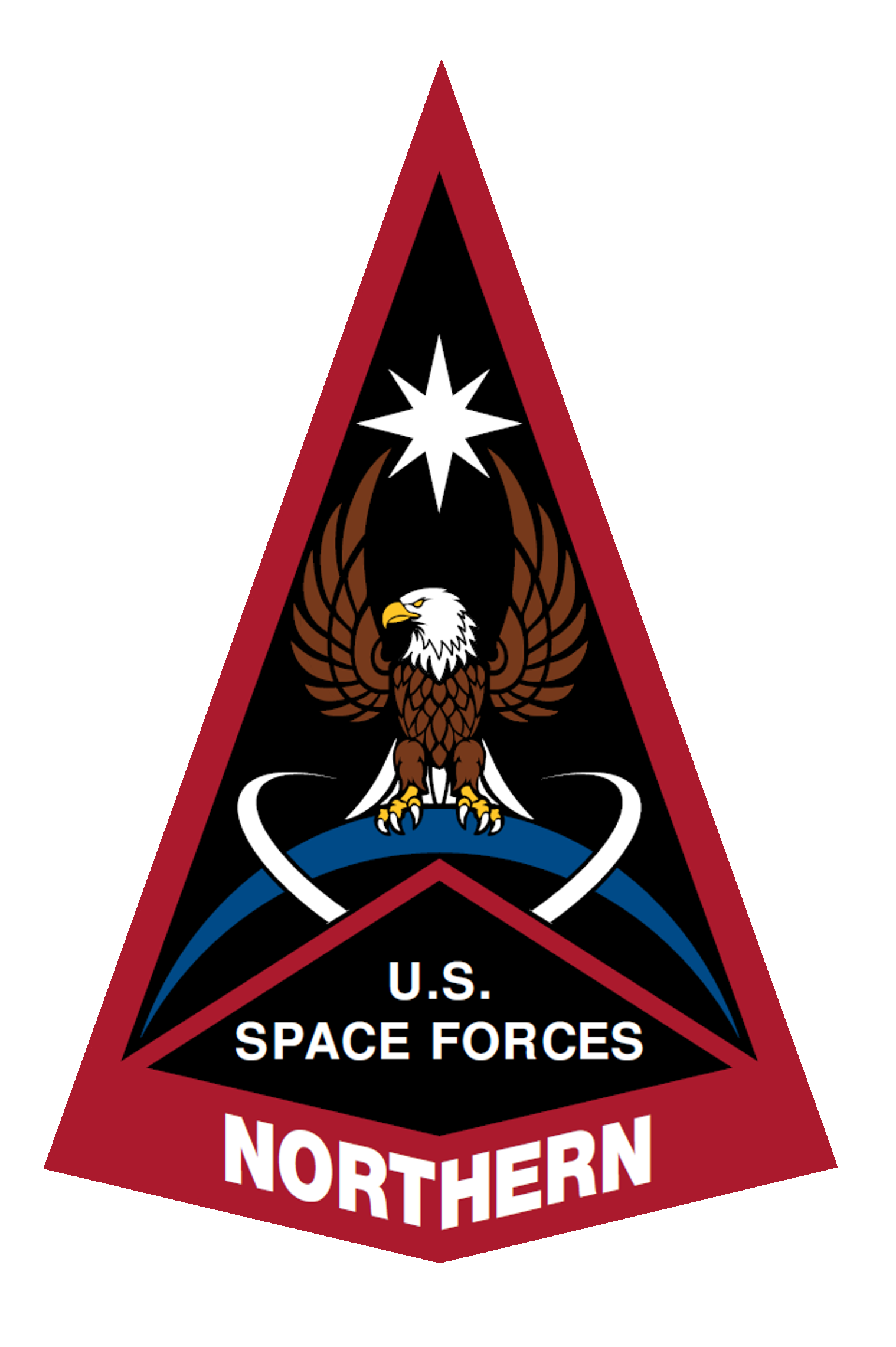
- Active: January 26, 2026 - present
- Country: United States
- Branch: United States Space Force
- Type: Field Component Command
- Part of: U.S. Northern Command
- Garrison/HQ: Peterson Space Force Base, Colorado

Commanders
- Current commander: Brig Gen Phillip Verroco
- Senior Enlisted Advisor: CMSgt Seth Hogan

Insignia
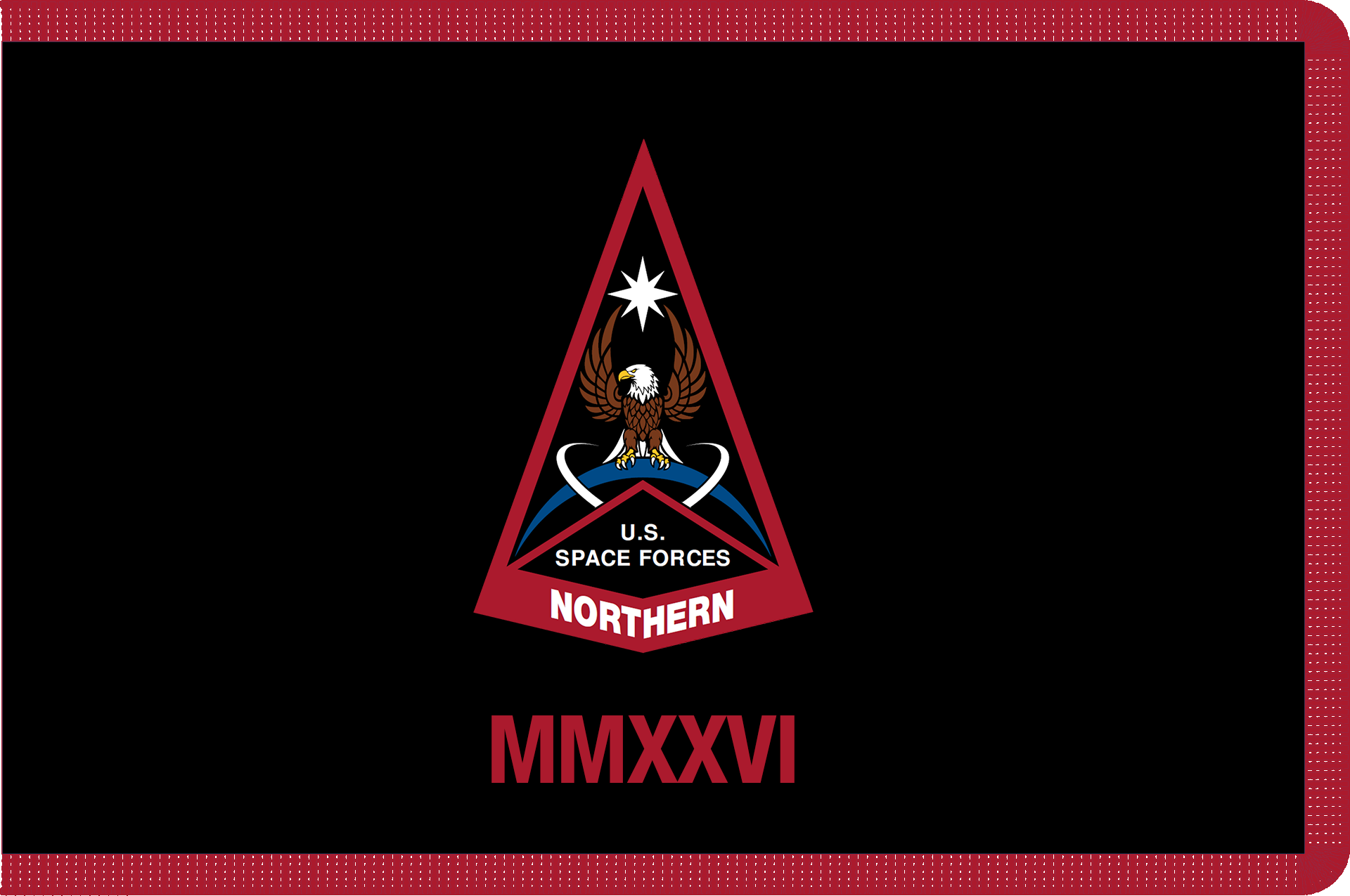
- Flag of the Space Force Northern Command

United States Space Forces Northern (SPACEFOR-NORTH) is the United States Space Force component field command to U.S. Northern Command (NORTHCOM). The command officially activated on Jan. 26, 2026 and completed their activation ceremony on Jan. 30, 2026 at Peterson Space Force Base, Colorado. SPACEFOR-NORTH is responsible with providing space operations support in defense of the homeland through multi-domain awareness; missile warning and tracking; global positioning, navigation, and timing; and orbital and electromagnetic warfare.

The creation of the command gained urgency from the announcement of the Trump administration's National Security Strategy in November 2025, which places a greater priority on the Western Hemisphere and quickly followed the creation of United States Space Forces – Southern. The command will be responsible for the requirements of the Golden Dome, a proposed advanced missile defense shield that could use ground, air, and space systems such as Low Earth Orbit (LEO) and Medium Earth Orbit (MEO) sensors to track and destroy missiles coming into the Western Hemisphere.

== List of commanders ==
No.	Commander		Term			Ref
No.	Portrait	Name	Took office	Left office	Term length	Ref
1	Robert Schreiner	Brigadier General; Robert Schreiner (born c. 1976)	30 January 2026	13 October 2026	256 days	
2	Phillip Verroco	Brigadier General; Phillip Verroco (born c. 1975)	13 October 2026	Incumbent	3 days	
