= Nikki Frankino =

U.S. Space Force general officer

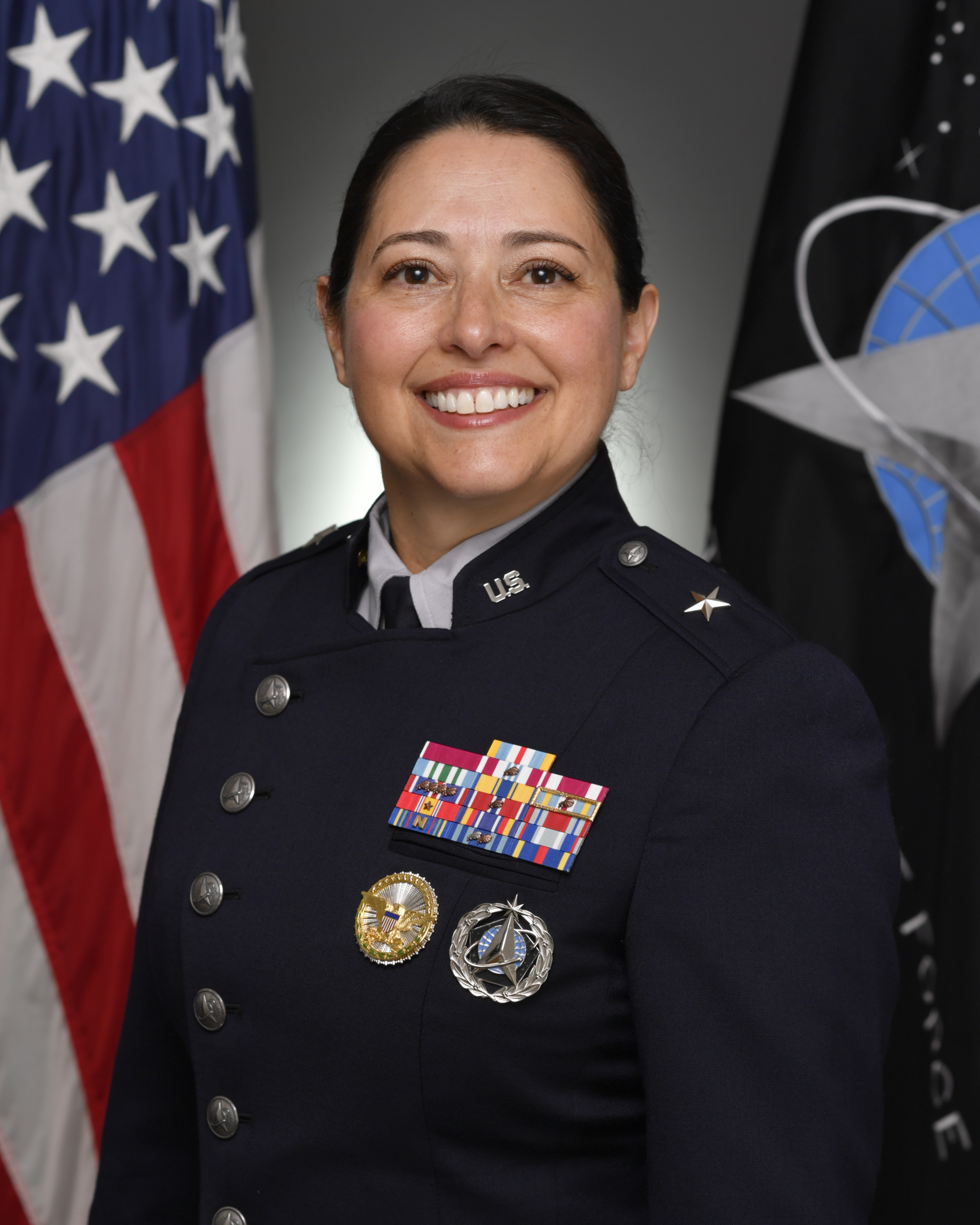
- Official portrait, 2025
- Born: c. 1975 (age 50–51); Visalia, California, U.S.
- Education: United States Air Force Academy (BS); Central Michigan University (MS)
- Military career
- Allegiance: United States
- Branch: United States Air Force: United States Space Force
- Service years: 1998–2021 (Air Force): 2021–present (Space Force)
- Rank: Brigadier General
- Commands: Space Delta 21; Operations Support Squadron, NRO
- Awards: Defense Superior Service Medal; Legion of Merit

Nikki Renee Frankino (née Vigil) (born c. 1975) is a United States Space Force brigadier general who serves as the legislative liaison of the Space Force. She previously served in the Office of the Secretary of the Air Force, including serving as the senior military assistant to Frank Kendall III.

In 2024, Frankino was nominated and confirmed for promotion to brigadier general.

== Military career ==
1. May 1998–July 1999, Distinguished Graduate, Undergraduate Space and Missile Training, Vandenberg Air Force Base, Calif.
2. July 1999–July 2003, Intercontinental Ballistic Missile Wing Emergency War Order Instructor, Minot AFB, N.D.
3. July 2003–July 2006, Test Program Manager and Executive Officer, NAVSTAR Global Positioning System, Space and Missile Systems Center, Los Angeles AFB, Calif.
4. July 2006–July 2009, Flight Commander, Processing Operations, Data Masked
5. July 2009–July 2010, Student, National Defense Intelligence College, Bolling AFB, Washington, D.C.
6. July 2010–July 2013, Branch Chief, Space Superiority Branch, Directorate of Strategic Plans, Programs, and Analyses Headquarters Air Force Space Command, Peterson AFB, Colo.
7. July 2013–July 2014, Deputy Division Chief, DoD Executive Agent for Space Staff, the Pentagon, Arlington, Va.
8. July 2014–July 2016, Squadron Commander, Operations Support Squadron, National Reconnaissance Office, Fort Belvoir, Va.
9. July 2016–July 2017, Chief of Staff, Ground Enterprise Directorate, NRO, Chantilly, Va.
10. July 2017–July 2018, Executive Officer, Deputy Director of the NRO, NRO, Chantilly, Va.
11. July 2018–July 2019, Student, Eisenhower School for National Security and Resource Strategy, Fort Lesley J. McNair, Washington, D.C.
12. July 2019–July 2021, Senior Military Evaluator for Space, Intelligence, Surveillance, and Reconnaissance Systems, Director, Operational Test and Evaluation, Office of the Secretary of Defense, Washington, D.C.
13. July 2021–June 2023, Commander, Delta 21, and Deputy Commander, NRO, Aerospace Data Facility - East, Fort Belvoir, Va.
14. June 2023–July 2024, Senior Military Assistant to the Secretary of the Air Force, the Pentagon, Arlington, Va.
15. July 2024–May 2025 Chief, House Liaison Division, Legislative Liaison, Office of the Secretary of the Air Force, the Pentagon, Arlington, Va.
16. May 2025–present, Space Force Legislative Liaison, the Pentagon, Arlington, Va.

== Dates of promotion ==
| Rank | Branch | Date |
|---|---|---|
| Second Lieutenant | Air Force | May 27, 1998 |
| First Lieutenant | Air Force | May 27, 2000 |
| Captain | Air Force | May 27, 2002 |
| Major | Air Force | January 1, 2008 |
| Lieutenant Colonel | Air Force | May 1, 2013 |
| Colonel | Air Force | July 1, 2019 |
| Colonel | Space Force | ~September 30, 2020 |
| Brigadier General | Space Force | June 30, 2025 |

Military offices
| Preceded by Todd J. Benson | Commander of Space Delta 21; 2023–2024 | Succeeded by Nicholas Martin |
| Preceded by Kayle M. Stevens | Senior Military Assistant to the Secretary of the Air Force; 2023–2024 | Succeeded by Kenneth C. McGhee |
| Preceded by Joseph L. Sheffield | Chief of the House Liaison Division at the Office of the Secretary of the Air Force; 2024–2025 | Vacant |
| Preceded by Robert Hutt | Legislative Liaison of the United States Space Force; 2025–present | Incumbent |
