= Aerospace Data Facility-Southwest =

Satellite ground station operated by the U.S. National Reconnaissance Office

- Part of White Sands Missile Range
- Las Cruces, New Mexico
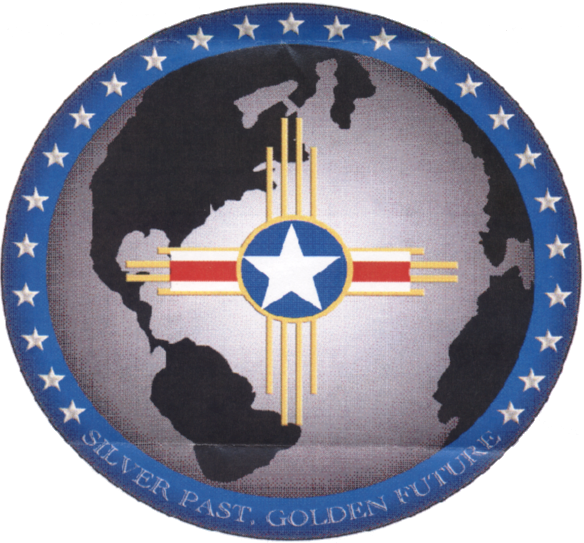

Site information
- Type: Satellite ground station
- Owner: United States Air Force
- Controlled by: National Reconnaissance Office

Location
- Coordinates: 32°30′7″N 106°36′39″W

Aerospace Data Facility-Southwest (ADF-SW) is one of three satellite ground stations operated by the National Reconnaissance Office (NRO) in the continental United States. Located within White Sands Missile Range in southern New Mexico, the facility is responsible for the command and control of reconnaissance satellites involved in the collection of intelligence information and for the dissemination of that intelligence to other U.S. government agencies.

== List of commanders ==
- Col Kelly D. Burt, May 2018
- Col Michael C. Todd, 8 July 2020
- Col Robert E. Shrader, March 2023

== See also ==
- Aerospace Data Facility-Colorado
- Aerospace Data Facility-East
- Pine Gap
- RAF Menwith Hill
- Spy satellite
