= Robert Hutt =

U.S. Space Force general officer

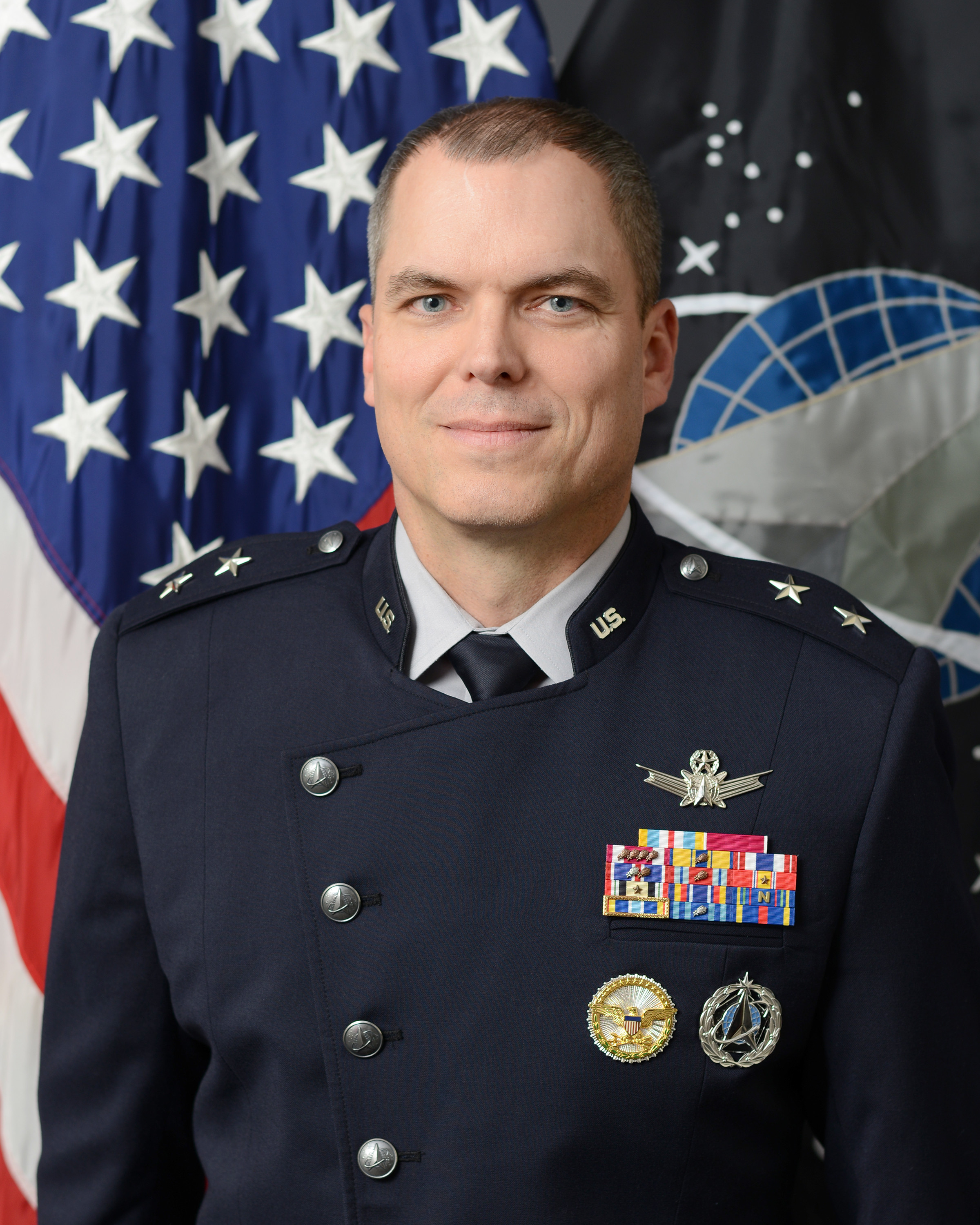
- Official portrait, 2026
- Born: c. 1977 (age 48–49); Sanford, Florida, U.S.
- Alma mater: United States Air Force Academy (BS); University of Colorado Denver (MS); Georgetown University
- Military career
- Allegiance: United States
- Branch: United States Air Force: United States Space Force
- Service years: 1999–2021 (Air Force): 2021–present (Space Force)
- Rank: Major General
- Commands: 460th Operations Group; 21st Operations Support Squadron
- Awards: Defense Superior Service Medal; Legion of Merit

Robert John Hutt (born c. 1977) is a United States Space Force major general who commanded the 460th Operations Group from 2018 to 2020. He now serves as the deputy program manager of Golden Dome of America. He previously served as the legislative liaison of the Space Force.

Hutt entered the United States Air Force in 1999 after graduating from the United States Air Force Academy. He initially served as a career missile officer before transitioning to becoming a career space operations officer. He has experience in the electronic warfare and missile warning mission areas, serving as commander of the 21st Operations Support Squadron. While commanding the 460th Operations Group, he deployed to Qatar in 2020 to serve as director of space forces of the Air Forces Central Command.

Hutt transferred to the Space Force in 2021, serving as senior executive officer to General John W. Raymond. In 2023, he was promoted to brigadier general.

== Early life and education ==
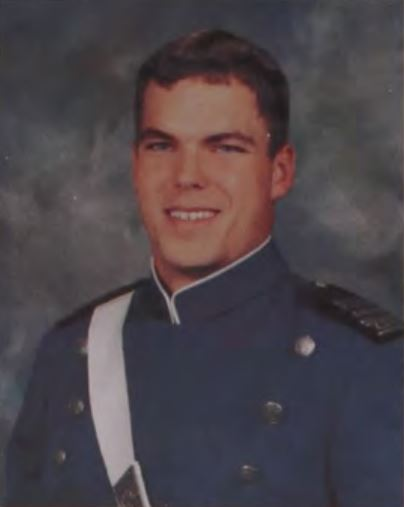
Hutt as a U.S. Air Force Academy cadet, 1991

Hutt was born in Sanford, Florida to Mr. and Mrs. Larry Hutt. In 1995, he graduated from Seminole High School. He received an appointment to the United States Air Force Academy as the nominee of John Mica, where he planned to become a navigator or a computer scientist.

In 1999, he graduated from the Air Force Academy with a B.A. degree in legal studies (philosophy). He received an M.S. degree in civil engineering from the University of Colorado Denver in 2008 and Master of Policy Management from Georgetown University in 2011. In 2016, he also received an M.S. in National Security Strategy from the National War College.

As part of his military training, Hutt attended Undergraduate Space and Missile Training at Vandenberg Air Force Base, California, and Air and Space Basic Course at Maxwell Air Force Base, Alabama, in 1999. The following year, he finished his ICBM Initial Qualification Training from Vandenberg. In 2004, he attended USAF Weapons School's Space Weapons Instructor Course. In 2005, he completed Principles of Space Control from Vandenberg and attended Squadron Officer School at Maxwell. In 2015, he attended Air War College.

== Military career ==
Hutt commissioned into the United States Air Force on June 2, 1999, as a second lieutenant after graduating from the United States Air Force Academy. After completing Undergraduate Space and Missile Training and ICBM Initial Qualification Training, he was assigned in 2000 to the 12th Missile Squadron at Malmstrom Air Force Base, Montana, as a deputy crew commander, crew commander, and line instructor. From 2002 to 2004, he served with the 341st Operations Group as evaluator and senior crew evaluator.

In 2005, after graduating from the USAF Weapons School, Hutt was assigned at the 76th Space Control Squadron at Peterson Air Force Base, Colorado, as a weapons and tactics flight commander. He stayed there until 2007 when he was reassigned to 21st Operations Support Squadron as an assistant operations officer and vault chief. From 2009 to 2010, he worked as the branch chief for counterspace current operations at the Air Force Space Command.

Hutt served as a military assistant to the under secretary of defense for research and engineering from 2016 to 2018. On June 15, 2018, Hutt took command of the 460th Operations Group, where he was responsible for overseeing the unit's missile warning missions. While in the job, he was deployed to Al Udeid Air Base, Qatar, as director of space forces for Air Forces Central Command from January to June 2020.

After his command tour, Hutt served as senior executive to the chief of space operations, General John W. Raymond, during which time he transferred to the United States Space Force. From 2021 to 2022, he was chief of the programming division at the Space Staff. In May 2022, he was nominated for promotion to brigadier general. In 2022, he was assigned as director of plans and programs and on July 8, 2023, he was promoted to brigadier general.

In July 2024, Hutt became the first legislative liaison of the Space Force.

== Awards and decorations ==
Hutt is the recipient of the following awards:

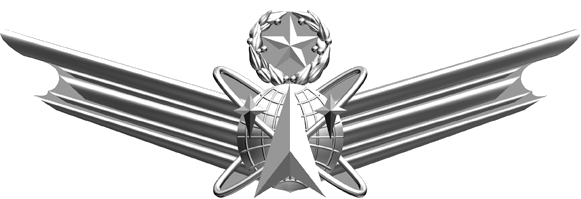
Command Space Operations Badge

Basic Parachutist Badge

Basic Missile Operations Badge

Office of the Secretary of Defense Badge

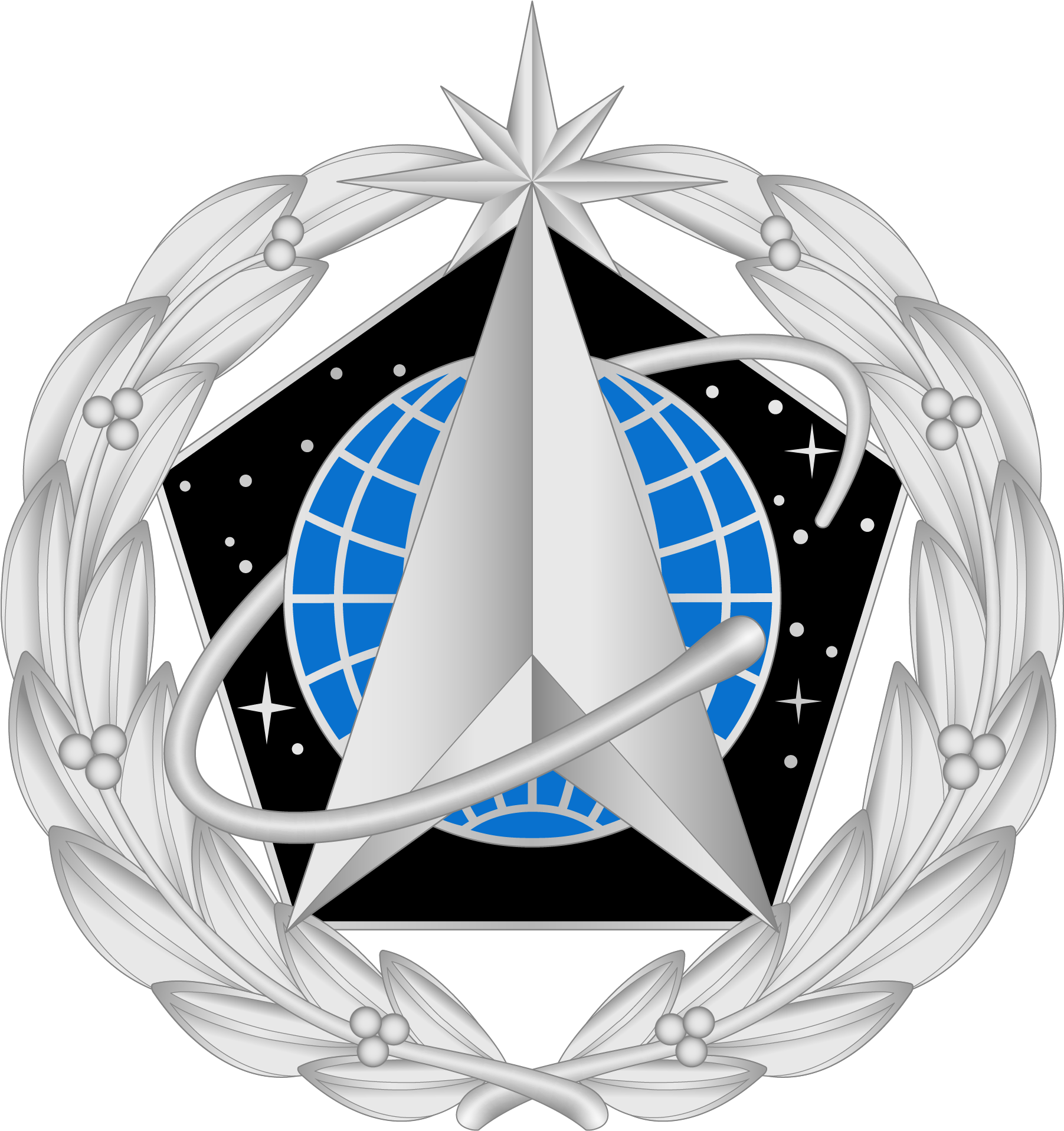

Space Staff Badge

Defense Superior Service Medal
Legion of Merit
Meritorious Service Medal with three bronze oak leaf clusters
Air Force Commendation Medal with one bronze oak leaf cluster
Air Force Meritorious Unit Award
Air Force Outstanding Unit Award with one silver and one bronze oak leaf clusters
Combat Readiness Medal with one bronze oak leaf cluster
National Defense Service Medal with one bronze service star
Iraq Campaign Medal with one bronze service star
Global War on Terrorism Service Medal
Nuclear Deterrence Operations Service Medal with "N" device
Air Force Expeditionary Service Ribbon with gold frame
Air Force Longevity Service Award with one silver oak leaf cluster
Air Force Training Ribbon

== Dates of promotion ==
Rank	Branch	Date
Second Lieutenant	Air Force	June 2, 1999
First Lieutenant	Air Force	June 2, 2001
Captain	Air Force	June 2, 2003
Major	Air Force	December 1, 2008
Lieutenant Colonel	Air Force	November 1, 2012
Colonel	Air Force	May 1, 2017
Colonel	Space Force	~September 30, 2020
Brigadier General	Space Force	July 8, 2023
Major General	Space Force	November 3, 2025

Military offices
Preceded by Lorenzo Bradley	Commander of the 460th Operations Group; 2018–2020	Succeeded by Richard L. Bourquin
Preceded by Tammy L. Schlichenmaier	Senior Executive Officer to the Chief of Space Operations; 2020–2021	Succeeded by James J. Watson
New office	Chief of Programming of the United States Space Force; 2021–2022	Succeeded by ???
Preceded by Jennifer L. Grant	Director of Plans and Programs of the United States Space Force; 2022–2024	Succeeded by Brian Denaro
New office	Legislative Liaison of the United States Space Force; 2024–2025	Succeeded by Nikki Frankino
Preceded by Catherine V. Barrington	Senior Military Assistant to the United States Deputy Secretary of Defense; 2025–present	Incumbent
