= Taqi Yazdi =

Iranian Shia scholar and philosopher (1935–2021)

- تقی یزدی
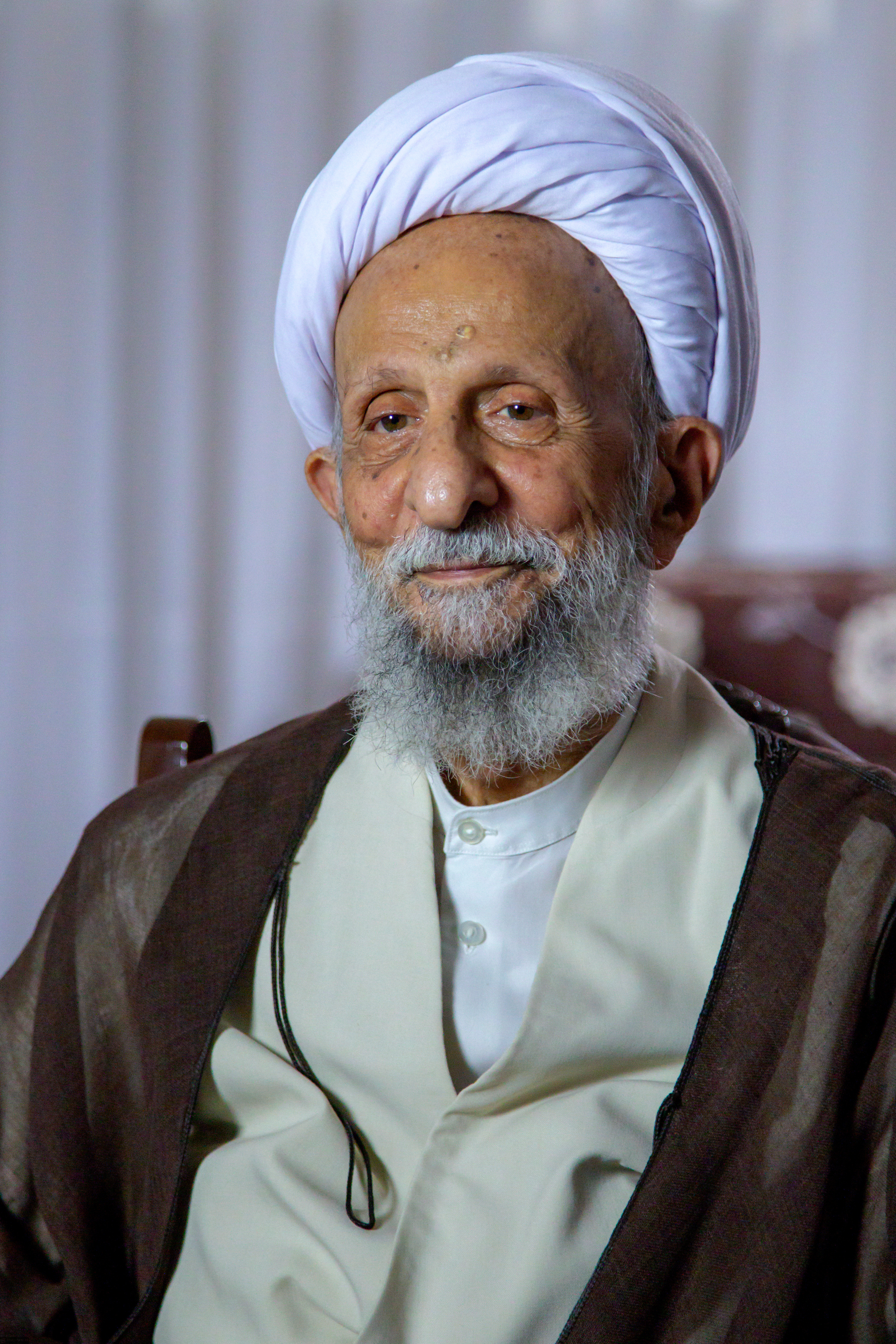
- Yazdi in 2020

Personal life
- Born: Taqi Givechi; 31 January 1935 Yazd, Iran
- Died: 1 January 2021 (aged 85) Tehran, Iran
- Resting place: Fatima Masumeh Shrine, Qom, Iran
- Children: 2 sons and 1 daughter
- Education: Khān School, Yazd (1940s); Shāfīʿiya School, Yazd (1940s); Hindi School, Najaf (1950)
- Known for: Incompatibility of Islam and democracy
- Relatives: Hossein Noori Hamedani (affinal)
- Website: mesbahyazdi.ir

Religious life
- Religion: Shia Islam
- Philosophy: Guardianship of the Islamic Jurist, Jihad; Contemporary Islamic philosophy (1963–1964 and 1989–2021)
- Sect: Jaʿfari Twelver
- Profession: Political activist

Senior posting
- Post: Imam Khomeini Educational Research Institute (1991–2021); In the Path of God Institute (1976–2021)
- Students: Gary Legenhausen; Gholam-Hossein Elham; Hamid Rasaee; Jawad Naqvi; Syed shaji mukhtar hyderabadi; Kazem Seddiqi; Morteza Agha-Tehrani; Parviz Davoudi; Sambi
- Influenced by: Seyyed Hossein Borujerdi; Ruhollah Khomeini; Mohammad-Taqi Bahjat Foumani; Mohammad Ali Araki; Muhammad Husayn Tabataba'i; Ahmad Fardid

Member of the Assembly of Experts
- In office 23 February 1999 – 23 May 2016
- Constituency: Tehran Province
- In office 21 February 1991 – 22 February 1999
- Constituency: Khuzestan Province

Personal details
- Party: Front of Islamic Revolution Stability (spiritual leader)
- Other political affiliations: Society of Seminary Teachers of Qom
- Membership: Supreme Council of the Cultural Revolution; Ahl Al-Bayt World Assembly
- Theological work
- Years active: 1947–1960 (study); 1966–2021 (teaching)
- Taught at: Qom Seminary; Haghani Seminary; Feyziyeh Seminary

Muhammad Taqi Misbah Yazdi Giwachi (Persian: محمدتقی مصباح یزدی گیوه‌چی, romanized: Muḥammad Taqī Miṣbāḥ Yazdī Gīwachī; 31 January 1935 – 1 January 2021) was an Iranian Shia scholar, political theorist and philosopher who served as the spiritual leader of the Front of Islamic Revolution Stability.

He was a member of the Assembly of Experts, the body responsible for choosing the Supreme Leader, where he headed a minority faction. He had been called 'the most conservative' and the most 'powerful' clerical oligarch in Iran's leading center of religious learning, the city of Qom. Many of his students have gone on to "occupy sensitive administrative and security posts" in the Islamic Republic, serving as "guardians" of (his version of) Islamic government.

From 1952 to 1960, in the holy city of Qom, he participated in the courses taught by Ruhollah Khomeini and Muhammad Husayn Tabataba'i; and, for approximately fifteen years, he was a student of Mohammad-Taqi Bahjat Foumani.

Mesbah Yazdi advocated Islamic philosophy and in particular Mulla Sadra's transcendent school of philosophy (Hikmat-e Muta`aliya). He believed that Iranians were moving away from religion and the values of the Islamic revolution; and opposed western-style freedom and democratic governance, promoted by the Iranian reform movement.

== Early life and education ==
Yazdi's actual last name was Giwachi, an occupational surname indicating his ancestors produced a type of traditional footwear called Giwah. After he completed his primary education in the town of Yazd at the age of 13, he entered Khān School, a seminary in his hometown. He also attended the Shāfīʿiya School, another seminary in the city before moving to Najaf's Hindi School in Iraq in 1950. Yazdi's study in Iraq lasted 7 months. He then moved to Qom to study in Qom Seminary, where he continued his education in fiqh (Islamic Jurisprudence). He studied works of Avicenna and Mulla Sadra. His teachers included prominent figures such as Ayatollah Seyyed Hossein Borujerdi, Ayatollah Ruhollah Khomeini and Ayatollah Mohammad Taghi Bahjat Foumani. He was also among the students of Ayatollah Allameh Tabatabaei, the author of Tafsir al-Mizan, the influential Shi'a exegesis of Quran. He graduated in 1960. Before the 1979 Islamic revolution, he assisted the other clerics, i.e., Mohammad Beheshti and Ali Akbar Hashemi Rafsanjani, in publishing two journals called "Mission of Prophet Muhammad" and "Revenge"; and was responsible for all publishing activities in "Revenge".

== Political activity ==
=== 1963–1989 ===
Mesbah Yazdi became politically active in 1963, following the 15th of Khordad movement (demonstrations against the arrest of Ayatollah Khomeini). He was involved in community organizing circulating petitions against the Shah's White Revolution reforms. After Khomeini was released from arrest, Mesbah Yazdi was among clerics who celebrated in the Feyziyeh School. He abandoned political activity before Ayatollah Khomeini's exile in 1964 and went back to theological work. He authored works strenuously denying the historical consensus that Ali Shariati's ideas contributed anything at all to the 1979 Iranian Revolution. Mesbah Yazdi is reported to have been "politically isolated" until 1989, when Ruhollah Khomeini died.

=== 1997–2016 ===
In 1997, after the election of President Mohammad Khatami, Mesbah Yazdi encouraged Iran's Revolutionary Guards and Hezbolli to put a stop to the reform agitation by any means, including violence.

He had been named by Akbar Ganji as "having encouraged or issued fatwas, or religious orders" for the 1998 chain murders assassinations of five Iranian dissidents.

After the decline of the reform movement in 2003, his supporters made gains in local and parliamentary elections. In 2005, Mesbah Yazdi supported Mahmoud Ahmadinejad's presidential bid and subsequently gained "direct influence" in the Iranian government through the appointment of loyal supporters "to high posts" after Ahmadinejad's victory.

==== 2009 presidential election ====
Mesbah-Yazdi supported Ahmadinejad in 2009 and declared his election a miracle and a gift from the Hidden Imam.

On 22 June, a few days after security forces broke up one of the biggest election protests, Mesbah-Yazdi "addressed a gathering" of Revolutionary Guards and told them:

"Do not be worried about the events and earthquakes that have occurred. Know that God created this world as a test, ... The supreme leader holds a great many of the blessings God has given us and at a time of such uncertainties our eyes must turn to him."

By 2011, however, he was sharply critical of Ahmadinejad saying that he was behaving "unnaturally" and needed to be "saved." After Ahmadinejad fired intelligence minister Heydar Moslehi without consulting Supreme Leader Ali Khamenei, Mesbah Yazdi stated, "That a human being would behave in a way that angers his closest friends and allies and turns them into opponents is not logical for any politician."

==== Assembly of Experts ====
According to some sources, Mesbah-Yazdi is rumored to have had ambitions to succeed Khamenei as Supreme Leader. Some clerics and some newspapers feared Mesbah-Yazdi was trying to expand his power by "packing" the Assembly of Experts with "loyalists." In October 2006, an acolyte of Mesbah-Yazdi, Mojtaba Samareh Hashemi, was appointed head of the election commission, supervisor of the poll for the Assembly of Experts, and many of the candidates in the 2006 Assembly of Experts elections were Mesbah-Yazdi loyalists (though they ran as independent candidates to avoid revealing their affiliation to him). However, his group failed to achieve a majority in that election, leaving the assembly in the hands of pragmatic conservatives. Mesbah-Yazdi himself won a seat but finished only in sixth-place in Tehran municipality where he ran, and had the minority faction in the assembly. In 2016 he was defeated for reelection to the Assembly.

== Career ==
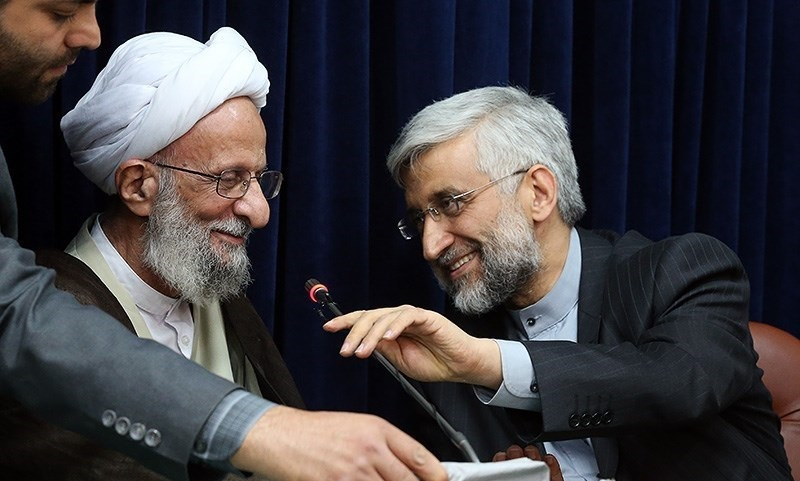
Mesbah-Yazdi meets with presidential candidate, Saeed Jalili, June 2013

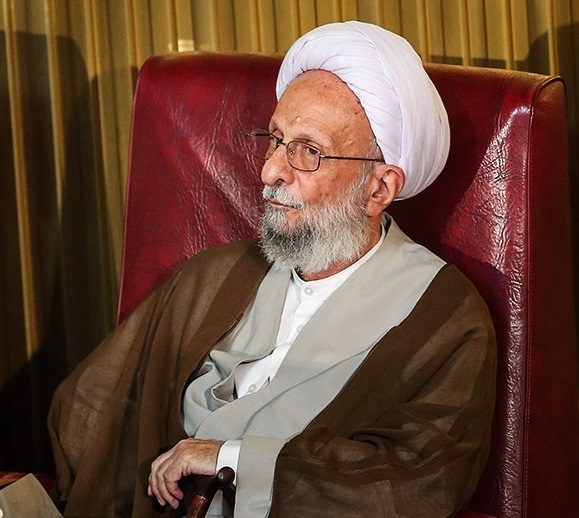
Mesbah Yazdi in Assembly of Experts, 2014

Mesbah Yazdi believed that the educational system of hawza should be changed and his proposal was approved by Seyyed Hossein Borujerdi, so he and Mohammad Beheshti establish the Haghani School (also Haqqani) in Qom to train the future cadres of Iran. Mesbah-Yazdi had been described as close to Ayatollah Mohammad Beheshti, Khomeini's first designated heir who was assassinated in Hafte Tir bombing in 1981 (despite being considered a moderate), and is (or was) a member of the school's board of directors. The Haghani School is very influential and had been described as "a kind of Ecole Nationale d'Administration for the Islamic Republic" whose alumni "form the backbone of the clerical management class that runs Iran's key political and security institutions."

Mesbah-Yazdi is the author of many books on fiqh, Quran exegesis, divinity and general issues of Islam. His "Amuzesh-e Falsafeh" is used widely in the philosophy classes of Qom's hawza. It broadly covers the same ground as Allameh Tabatabaei's Arabic-language works in philosophy "Bidayat al-Hikmah" and "Nihayat al-Hikma". Mesbah-Yazdi's "Amuzesh-e Falsafeh" has been published in English translation by Gary Legenhausen and Azim Sarvdalir as "Philosophical Instructions".

He published the weekly Parto Sokhan, was the director of the Imam Khomeini Education and Research Institute in Qom, (founded in 1995), and was a member of the Iranian Assembly of Experts from 1991 to 2016.

After the presidential election of June 1997, in the relatively more open political atmosphere in that time, Mesbah Yazdi's students played an important role as the critics of the former president Mohammad Khatami. As a result, Mesbah Yazdi's name appeared more often in the media and became more well known. He supported Mahmoud Ahmadinejad's successful presidential bid, though he later criticized him.

== Views ==
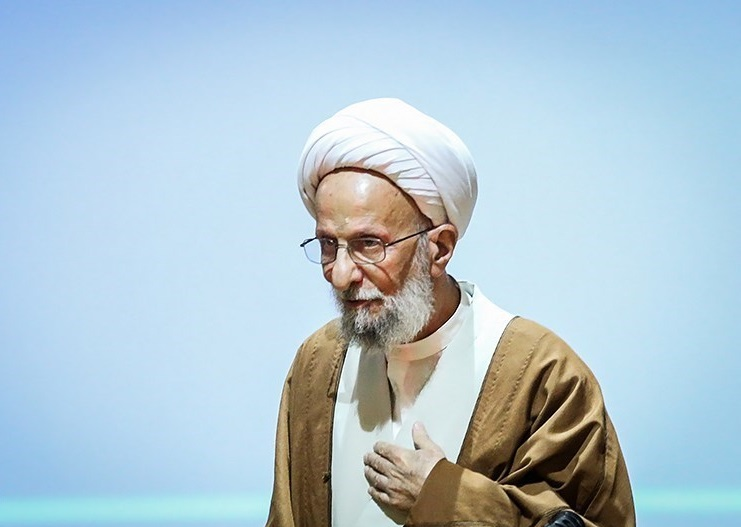
Mesbah-Yazdi in Principlists Grand Coalition Convention

Mesbah Yazdi had been described as "a theoretician of the radicals" in Iran, and "is opposed to western culture", lamenting that "nowadays ... if someone says something critical" of freedom and democracy, "he or she will face serious peril." He considered "the Zionists" to be the fundamental source of evil on earth.

In an article by the Associated Press, quoting from a 2005 book written by Yazdi, the AP asserted that Yazdi made a "rare public call for the producing the 'special weapons' that are monopoly of a few nations -- a veiled reference to nuclear arms."

In a lecture posted on his website, Ayatollah Mesbah Yazdi warns of Muslim "thugs of falsehood and the followers of the damned Satan" who have formed a

coalition of the forces of infidelity and hypocrisy, the servants of dollars and euros/gold and silver, and influential oppressors and traitors to uproot Islam, to fight Muslims, to dominate their countries, wealth, and resources, to deny their glories and excellence, to destroy their relics and teachings, to wipe out their culture, to alter their identity, to put them in miserable conditions, and to force them into wretchedness in this world and God’s punishment in the hereafter.

Mesbah-Yazdi supported a return to what he saw as the values of the 1979 Iranian revolution. He believed that an "Islamic republic" is a contradiction in terms, on the grounds that a truly Islamic government would only hold "elections" as a way for the people to express their allegiance to the supreme faqih. Elections as an opportunity for voters to make choices between representatives and policies were unIslamic. The "republican component" of the Islamic Republic of Iran was established as a concession to secular forces and should be "stripped" away to leave the true essence of the "Islamic system." He had been quoted as saying, "It doesn't matter what the people think. The people are ignorant sheep."

Mesbah-Yazdi was also a firm opponent of the Reformist movement in Iran which he believed an Islamic government must "combat ... because injecting misleading ideas [of reform in Islam] is like injecting the Aids virus!". He also claimed that young Iranians who questioned the regime after studying abroad did so only because they had been trained in 'psychological warfare' by foreign universities. President Khatami once called him the theoretician of violence.

In 2005, he issued a fatwa urging Iranians to vote for Mahmoud Ahmadinejad, a former student and "protege", whom he is "considered a ideological and spiritual mentor" of, and with whom he reportedly met with weekly.

Like many prominent Shia clerics, he supported literal interpretations of various verses of the Qur'an and narrations (hadith) attributed to the Prophet and his followers. Ayatollah Mesbah Yazdi opposed bida'a or innovations in religion which he believed includes new interpretations of the Sunna and Qur'an. He had been quoted as saying: "If someone tells you he has a new interpretation of Islam, sock him in the mouth."

In August 2009, he warned Iranian opposition groups against undermining supreme leader Ali Khamenei, stating,

"When the president is endorsed by the leader, obeying him is similar to obedience to God."

Yazdi accused Jews and Zionists of controlling "the majority of centers of corruption in the world." He called Jews "the most corrupt in the world" and "the most seditious group among all human beings," claiming they seek to corrupt others to dominate the world and will not rest "until they destroy Islam."

== Controversy ==
Ayatollah Mesbah Yazdi had been described as "affiliated" with the Hojjatieh group. Mesbah denied this and denounced the rumor, saying that if anyone finds a connection between him and Hojjatieh, he will renounce everything he stands for. Ayatollah Khomeini actually frowned on the Hojjatieh and the group was nominally dissolved in 1983.

== Public image ==
According to a poll conducted in March 2016 by Information and Public Opinion Solutions LLC (iPOS) among Iranian citizens, Mesbah had 18% approval and 20% disapproval ratings and thus a –2% net popularity; while 52% of responders didn't recognize the name.

== Personal life ==
He married his wife, who is from Ayatollah Hossein Noori Hamedani's family, in the 1950s. The couple had three children, two sons and a daughter. Both their sons are said to be clerics and one of them has studied in McGill University of Montreal, Quebec, Canada. The daughter is married to Hujjat al-Islam Mohammadi Araghi, who headed the "Islamic Culture and Communication Organization", a subdivision of Ministry of Culture and Islamic Guidance.

== works ==
Misbah Yazdi authored numerous works on Islamic philosophy, theology, ethics, and political thought, including:

- Self-Recognition for Self-Improvement
- A Cursory Glance at the Theory of Wilayat al-Faqih
- Provisions for the Journey (Mishkat), Volume 1
- Provisions for the Journey (Mishkat), Volume 2
- The Status of Women in Islam
- Investigations and Challenges
- The Qur'an As Reflected in Nahj al-Balaghah
- In the Presence of the Beloved
- Philosophical Instructions
- Theological Instructions (Amuzish-e 'Aqa'id)
- The Philosophy of Ethics
- Freedom, The Unstated Facts and Points
- Islamic Political Theory (Legislation): Volume 1
- Islamic Political Theory (Legislation): Volume 2

== See also ==
- Quotations related to Taqi Yazdi at Wikiquote
- Mahmoud Ahmadinejad
- Abbasali Amid Zanjani
- History of fundamentalist Islam in Iran
- List of ayatollahs
