= Bencivenga =

Bencivenga (pronounced [ˌbɛntʃiˈvɛŋɡa]) is an Italian surname from Naples and Caserta, originally a medieval male given name translating to 'may I come here well' or 'may it [be]come well to us'. Notable people with the surname include:

- Angelo Bencivenga (born 1991), Italian footballer
- Edoardo Bencivenga (1885–1934) Italian film director
- Ermanno Bencivenga (born 1950), Italian philosopher and academic
- Fabio Bencivenga (born 1976), Italian water polo player

== See also ==
- Bencivengo
- Bencivenni
- Bentivegna
- Cenni
