= Bentivegna =

Bentivegna (pronounced [ˌbɛntiˈvɛɲɲa]) is an Italian surname from Sicily, originally a medieval male given name translating to 'may it [be]come well to you'). Notable people with the surname include:

- Accursio Bentivegna (born 1996), Italian footballer
- Christopher Bentivegna, American singer, actor and theatre director
- Francesco Bentivegna (1820–1856), Italian patriot
- John F. Bentivegna (born 1976), United States Space Force sergeant
- Roberto Bentivegna, British-Italian screenwriter
- Rosario Bentivegna (1922–2012), Italian partisan and physician

== See also ==
- Bentivegna de' Bentivegni (c. 1230–1289), Italian Roman Catholic cardinal
- Bencivenga
