= Roger A. Towberman =

1st Chief Master Sergeant of the Space Force

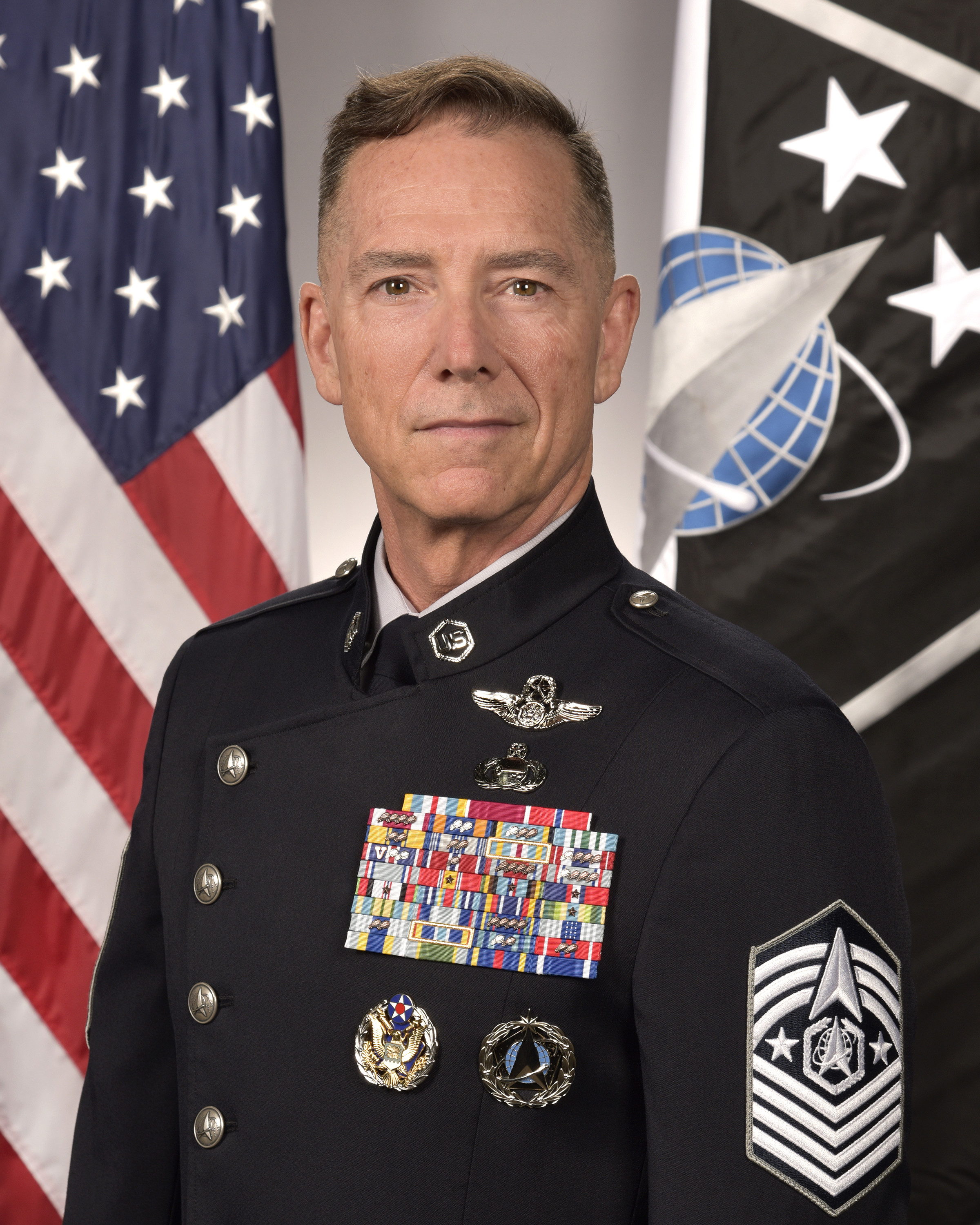
- Official portrait, 2022
- Born: 1967 or 1968 (age 58–59); Alden, Iowa
- Military career
- Allegiance: United States
- Branch: United States Air Force (1990–2020); United States Space Force (2020–2023)
- Service years: 1990–2023
- Rank: Chief Master Sergeant of the Space Force
- Units: United States Space Command; Air Force Space Command; 25th Air Force; 480th Intelligence, Surveillance and Reconnaissance Wing
- Conflicts: Iraq War; War in Afghanistan
- Awards: Air Force Distinguished Service Medal; Defense Superior Service Medal; Legion of Merit; Bronze Star Medal

Roger A. Towberman (born 1967/1968) is a retired United States Space Force senior non-commissioned officer who last served as the first chief master sergeant of the Space Force from 2020 to 2023. He also served as the senior enlisted leader of the United States Space Command from 2019 to 2020.

Towberman entered the United States Air Force in 1990. A career ground and airborne cryptologic language and intelligence analyst, he has served as senior enlisted leader for Air Force Space Command, Twenty-Fifth Air Force, 480th Intelligence, Surveillance and Reconnaissance Wing, 55th Electronic Combat Group, and 488th Intelligence Squadron. He transferred to the Space Force on April 3, 2020, becoming the service's first enlisted member.

== Early life and education ==
Towberman is the son of Ralph and Holly Towberman. He graduated from Cumberland High School in 1986.

Towberman has attended the following military education courses:

- 1995 Pacific Air Forces Airman Leadership School, Hickam AFB, Hawaii
- 2002 U.S. Air Forces in Europe Non-Commissioned Officer Academy, Kapaun AB, Germany
- 2002 Joint Advanced Tactical Signals Intelligence Training Program, Naval Strike, Air Warfare Center, Fallon, Nev.
- 2004 Associate in Communications Application Technology degree, Community College of the Air Force
- 2006 U.S. Air Force Senior Noncommissioned Officer Academy, Maxwell AFB, Ala.
- 2009 U.S. Air Force Chief Master Sergeant Leadership Course, Maxwell AFB, Ala.
- 2014 Air Force Smart Operations for the 21st Century, University of Tennessee, Knoxville, Tenn.
- 2014 Enterprise Leadership Seminar, University of North Carolina, Chapel Hill, N.C.

== Military career ==
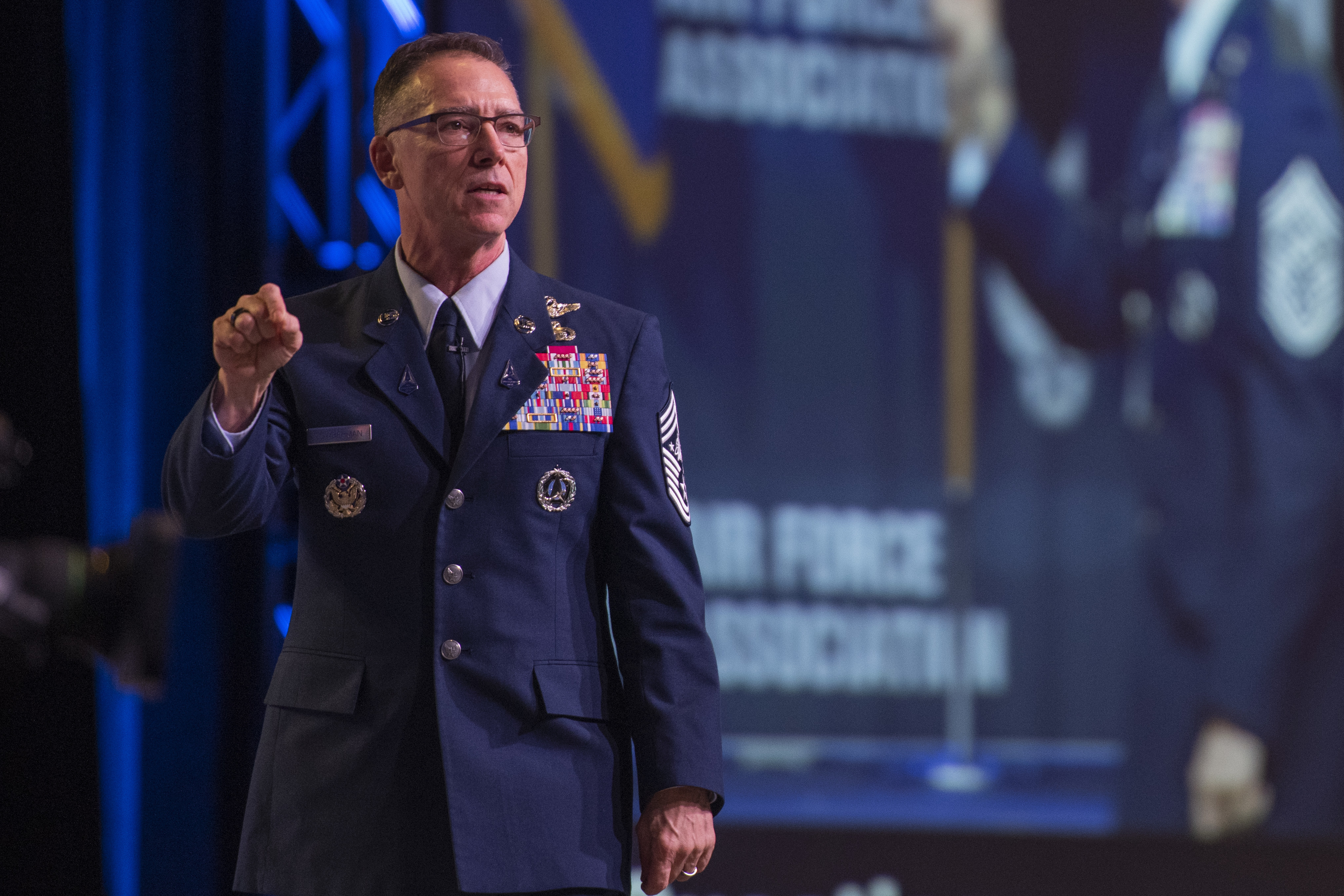
Towberman speaks at the Air Force Association Air, Space and Cyber Conference in National Harbor, Maryland, 2021

Towberman entered the United States Air Force in September 1990, after which he underwent basic military training. He then studied at the Defense Language Institute from October 1990 to December 1991. In May 1992, after graduating from the cryptologic language analyst course at Goodfellow Air Force Base, Texas, he was assigned as systems operator and collection manager at Wheeler Army Airfield, Hawaii. He was stationed there for almost five years until he was assigned to Kelly Field, Texas, as a command and control network analyst in March 1997.

From March 1999 to August 2007, Towberman deployed to RAF Mildenhall, United Kingdom, as superintendent for standardization and evaluations and flight chief for airborne operations of the 488th Intelligence Squadron. In August 2007, he was assigned as operations superintendent for the 338th Combat Training Squadron. In October 2009, he returned to RAF Mildenhall to serve as operations superintendent for the 488th Intelligence Squadron.

In August 2011, Towberman became the superintendent of the 55th Electronic Combat Group at Davis–Monthan Air Force Base, Arizona, during which he was deployed to Bagram as superintendent of the 455th Expeditionary Operations Group from April to November 2012. In May 2013, he was assigned as command chief master sergeant of the 480th Intelligence, Surveillance and Reconnaissance Wing at Joint Base Langley–Eustis, Virginia.

Towberman was selected to serve as command chief master sergeant for the Twenty-Fifth Air Force at Joint Base San Antonio, Texas, serving from September 2014 to August 2017. After that stint, he was assigned to the Pentagon as senior enlisted advisor to Shon J. Manasco, the assistant secretary of the Air Force (manpower & reserve affairs).

In November 2018, Towberman started serving as command chief for the Air Force Space Command at Peterson Air Force Base, Colorado. When the United States Space Command was reestablished in August 2019, he concurrently served as its first command senior enlisted leader. He relinquished responsibility as command senior enlisted leader in August 2020 after a permanent replacement, U.S. Marine Corps Master Gunnery Sergeant Scott H. Stalker, was chosen.

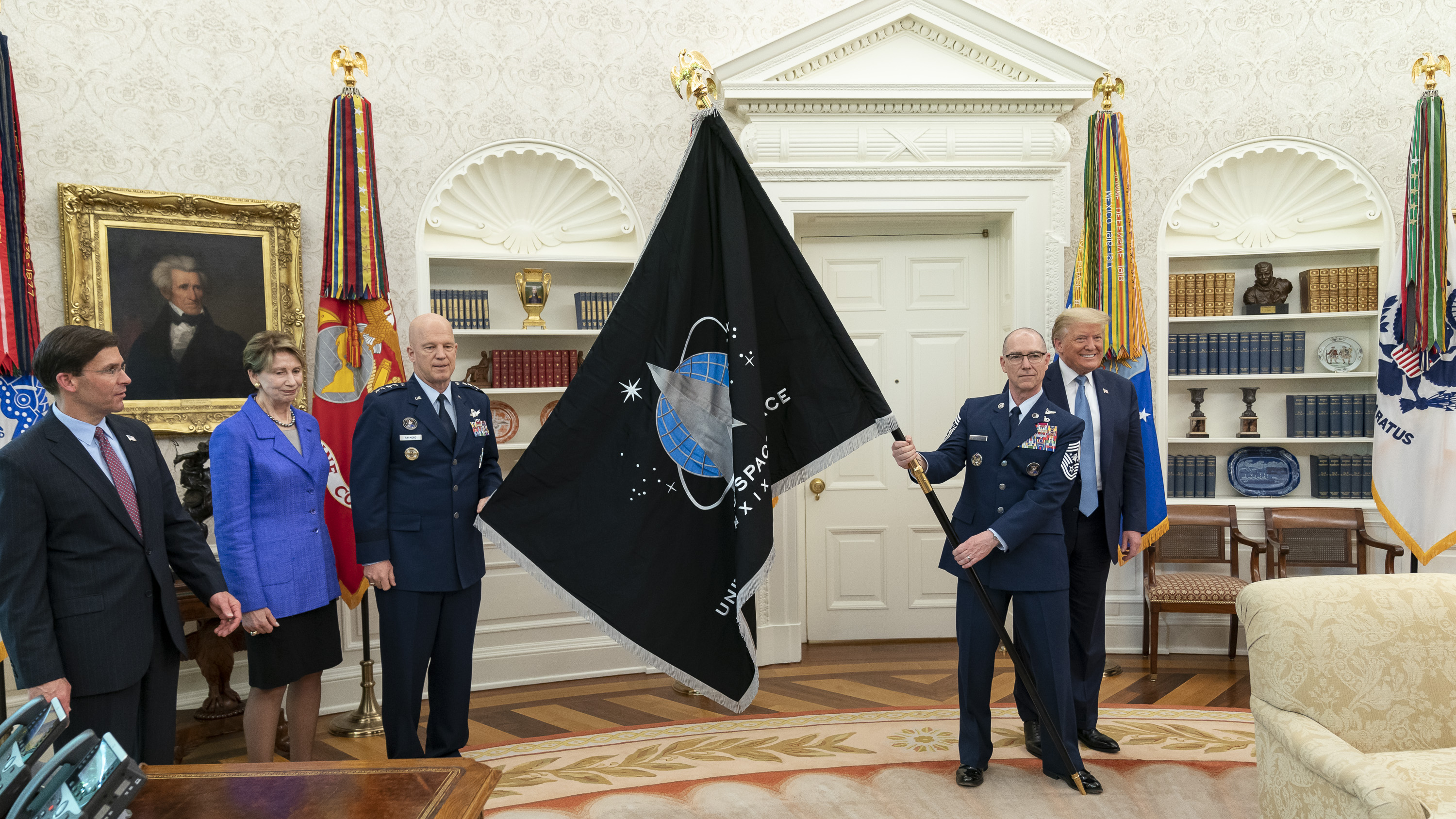
Towberman presents the Space Force flag in the Oval Office, 2020

In December 2019, the United States Space Force was established from elements of the Air Force Space Command. In April 2020, General John W. Raymond, the first chief of space operations, chose Towberman to serve as the first senior enlisted advisor of the Space Force, the highest enlisted position in the new service. He assumed office on April 3, 2020, transferring to the Space Force as the second guardian and the first enlisted service member. The position was later renamed as the "chief master sergeant of the Space Force."

Towberman's background includes various duties as a ground and airborne cryptologic language and intelligence analyst. Throughout his career, he has filled myriad leadership roles at the squadron, group, wing, and numbered Air Force level, while stateside and deployed on Operations Joint Forge, Allied Force, Northern Watch, Southern Watch, Iraqi Freedom, Enduring Freedom, and Unified Protector. He is a Career Enlisted Aviator with more than 4,500 flying hours.

== Awards and decorations ==
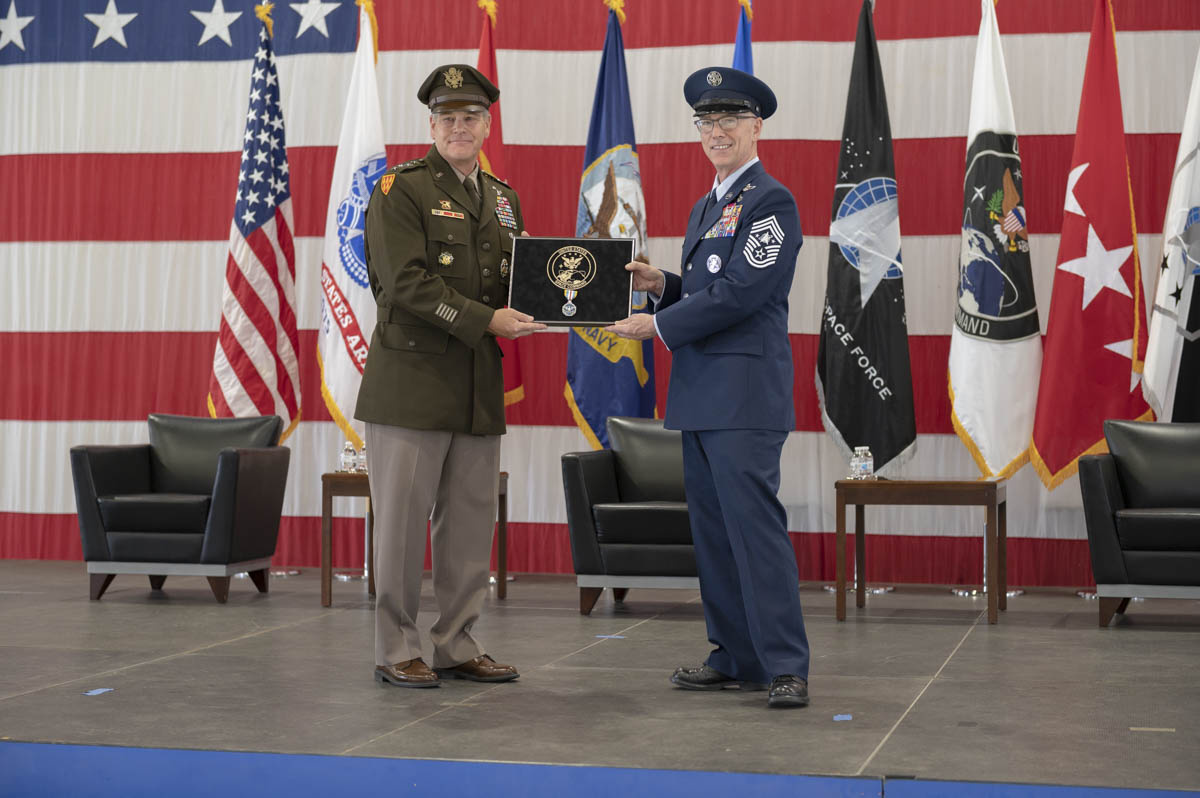
Gen Dickinson (left) presents Towberman (right) with the Defense Superior Service Medal during a ceremony in 2020

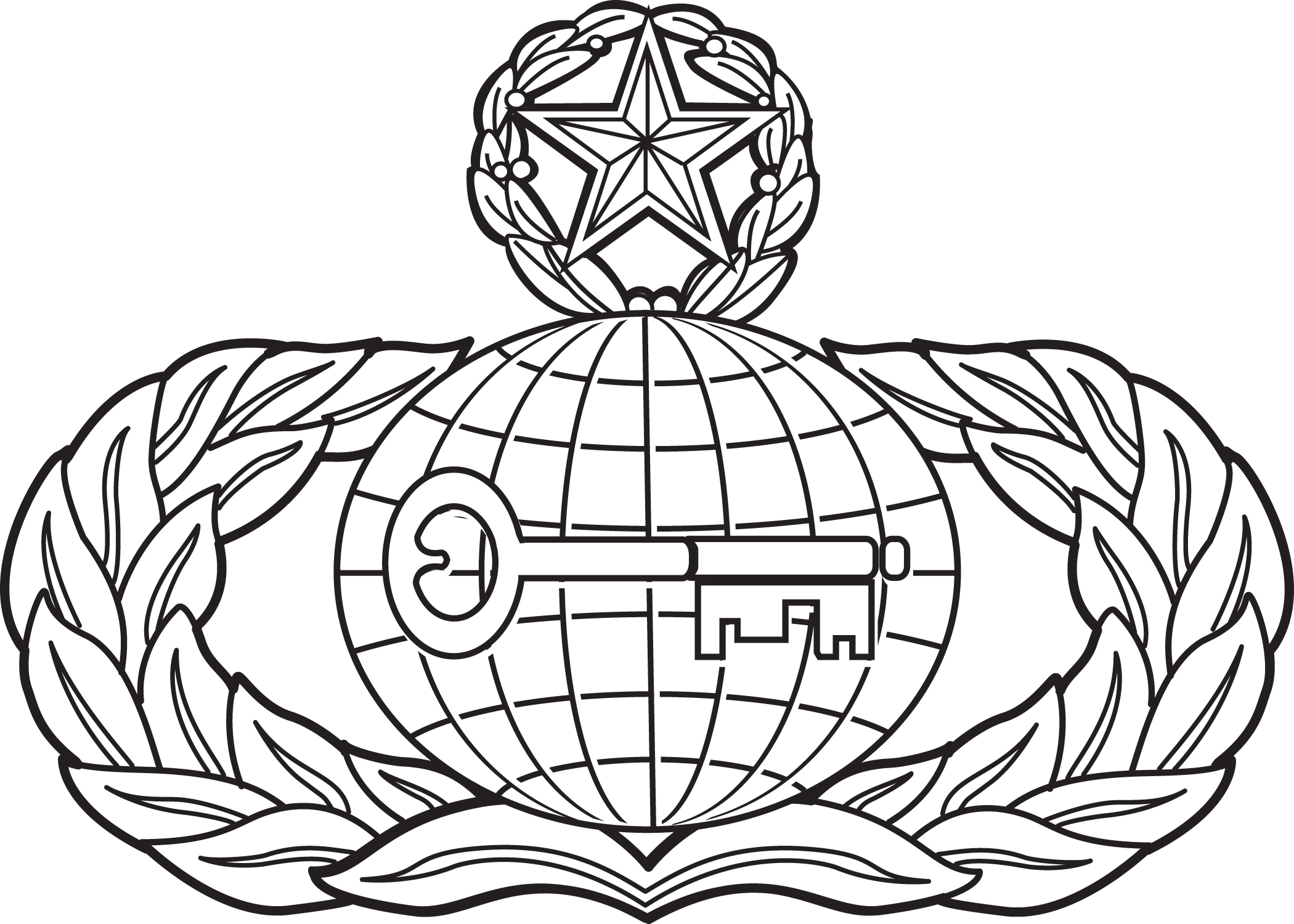
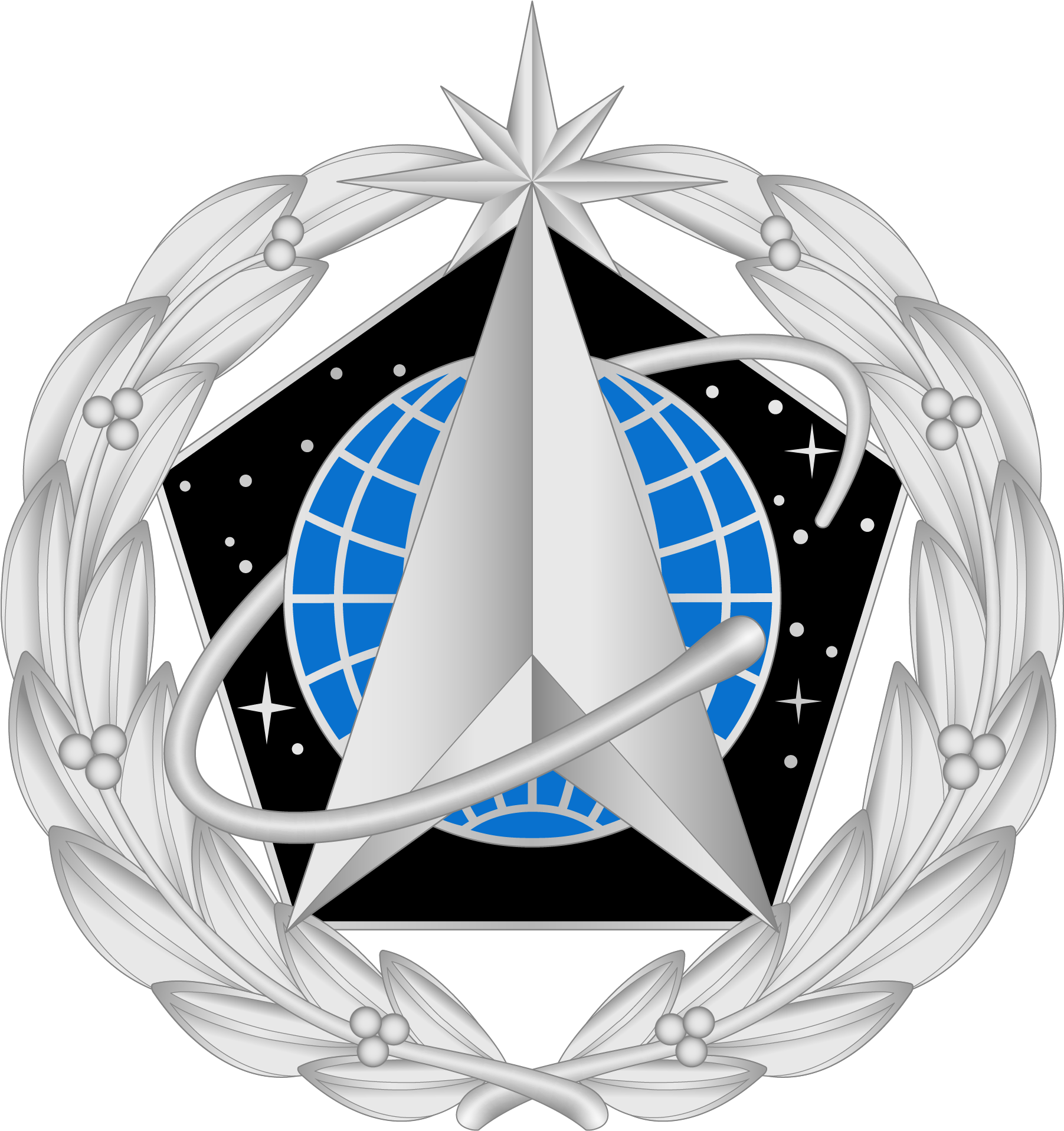
US Air Force Master Enlisted Aircrew Badge
Master Intelligence Badge
Space Staff Badge
Headquarters Air Force Badge

Air Force Distinguished Service Medal
Defense Superior Service Medal
Legion of Merit
Bronze Star Medal
Meritorious Service Medal with four bronze oak leaf clusters
Air Medal with two silver oak leaf clusters
Aerial Achievement Medal with one silver and two bronze oak leaf clusters
Joint Service Commendation Medal
Air Force Commendation Medal with two oak leaf clusters
Air Force Achievement Medal with two bronze oak leaf clusters
Joint Meritorious Unit Award
Air Force Meritorious Unit Award with silver and three bronze oak leaf clusters
Air Force Outstanding Unit Award with "V" device and two silver oak leaf clusters
Air Force Organizational Excellence Award with oak leaf cluster
Combat Readiness Medal with four oak leaf clusters
Air Force Good Conduct Medal with silver and three bronze oak leaf clusters
Air Force Good Conduct Medal (second ribbon to denote tenth award)
National Defense Service Medal with one bronze service star
Armed Forces Expeditionary Medal with service star
Kosovo Campaign Medal with service star
Afghanistan Campaign Medal with service star
Global War on Terrorism Expeditionary Medal
Global War on Terrorism Service Medal
Armed Forces Service Medal with service star
Military Outstanding Volunteer Service Medal
Air and Space Campaign Medal
Nuclear Deterrence Operations Service Medal with four oak leaf clusters
Air Force Overseas Short Tour Service Ribbon
Air Force Overseas Long Tour Service Ribbon with two bronze oak leaf clusters
Air Force Expeditionary Service Ribbon with gold frame
Air Force Longevity Service Award with one silver and one bronze oak leaf clusters
Non-Commissioned Officer Professional Development Ribbon with two oak leaf clusters
Basic Training Honor Graduate Ribbon
Small Arms Expert Marksmanship Ribbon
Air Force Training Ribbon
NATO Medal for the former Yugoslavia

Military offices
New office	Chief Master Sergeant of the Space Force; 2020–2023	Succeeded by John F. Bentivegna
