= Mostafa Mehrayin =

Iranian sociologist (born 1974)

Mostafa Mehrayin (Persian: مصطفی مهرآیین; also transliterated Mehrayin born August 27, 1974) is an Iranian sociologist, writer, and university professor. He works as a researcher at the Institute for Humanities and Cultural Studies in Tehran. Mehrayin became known as one of the outspoken critics of the Iranian government, particularly following his participation in a televised debate in 2023 and the publication of an open letter addressed to the Supreme Leader of the Islamic Republic of Iran in 2024. In 2025, Mehrayin was sentenced to eight years of imprisonment.

== Biography ==
Mostafa Mehrayin was born on August 27, 1974, in Bandar Deyr, Bushehr Province. He received his bachelor's degree in English Translation from Allameh Tabataba’i University in 1997. He subsequently completed his master’s and doctoral degrees in sociology, specializing in culture, at Tarbiat Modares University in 2000 and 2007, respectively.

== University activities ==
Mehrayin has taught at various universities, including Tarbiat Modares University, the University of Science and Culture, the Imam Khomeini Educational and Research Institute, and the Islamic Azad University (Science and Research Branch). After obtaining his doctorate, he began working as a researcher at the Institute for Humanities and Cultural Studies. His other activities include contributing to the compilation of social science encyclopedias and founding the “Rokhdad-e Tazeh” research institute in 2011, which remained active until the end of 2014.

== Social and political activities ==
Mehrayin is among the academic figures who criticize the Islamic Republic of Iran. His appearance in a televised debate with Mehdi Jamshidi in January–February 2024, during which he criticized “political despotism” in Iran, sparked widespread reactions in the public sphere. In February–March 2025, he published an open letter addressed to Ali Khamenei, criticizing the Islamic Republic’s overall policies and calling for a referendum on the form of government, the resignation of the Supreme Leader of the Islamic Republic, and the initiation of direct negotiations with the United States.

In another letter, published after a judicial case was opened against him and he was summoned to the Culture and Media Prosecutor’s Office, Mehrayin referred to the experience of South Africa and urged Ali Khamenei to relinquish power peacefully and accept forgiveness. After writing his letter to the Supreme Leader of the Islamic Republic, he stated in an interview with Radio Farda: “Khamenei is out of reach, yet he is the main cause of all tensions.” Subsequently, more than 100 university professors responded to Mostafa Mehrayin’s summons, describing it as a violation of freedom of thought and expression.

In January–February 2026, the Islamic Revolutionary Court sentenced Mehrayin to five years of imprisonment for the charge of “assembly and collusion with the intent to commit crimes against national security,” one year of imprisonment for “propaganda activities against the Islamic Republic of Iran,” and two years of imprisonment for “insulting the Supreme Leader.”

== Authorship ==
- The Story of Life and the Production of Thought: A Sociological Explanation of the Emergence of the Polyphonic Discourse of Islamic Modernism in Contemporary Iran
- Theories of the Sociology of Knowledge: A New Model for Explaining the Production of Cultural and Artistic Discourses in Muslim Countries
- A Bibliography of the Study of Transformations in Religious Thought in the Muslim World in the Modern Era: A Fundamental Classification
- The Conditions of Art Production: The Roots of the Emergence of Neorealist-Critical Cinema in Iran, co-authored with Zahra Eftekhari
- Power and Text: The Role of Ideological Cinema in the 1980s in Consolidating the Power of the Islamic Republic
- The Sociology of Commercial Advertising: The Relationship Between Commercial Advertising and the Structural and Discursive Conditions of Iran During the War, co-authored with Hourieh Nouri

=== Translations ===
- The Iranian Revolution: The Roots of Crisis and Unrest, by Dr. Mehran Kamrava, Kergerden Publishing.
- The Sociology of Culture: A Theory of the Subtle and Complex Relationship Between Thought and Social Structure, by Robert Wuthnow, Kergerden Publishing.
- The Conditions of the Production of Thought: The Historical Sociology of Intellectual Transformations in the Muslim World, by Mansoor Moaddel and Charles Kurzman, Kergerden Publishing.

== Works ==
=== Publications ===
- The Story of Life and the Production of Thought: A Sociological Explanation of the Emergence of the Polyphonic Discourse of Islamic Modernism in Contemporary Iran
- Theories of the Sociology of Knowledge
- A Bibliography of Intellectual and Religious Transformations in the Muslim World in the Modern Era
- The Conditions of Art Production (co-authored with Zahra Eftekhari)
- Power and Text: The Role of Ideological Cinema in the 1980s in Consolidating the Power of the Islamic Republic
- The Sociology of Commercial Advertising (co-authored with Hourieh Nouri)

=== Translations ===
- The Iranian Revolution: The Roots of Crisis and Unrest, by Mehran Kamrava.
- The Sociology of Culture, by Robert Wuthnow.
- The Conditions of the Production of Thought, by Mansoor Moaddel and Charles Kurzman.
