= Chief Master Sergeant of the Space Force =

Senior enlisted member of the U.S. Space Force

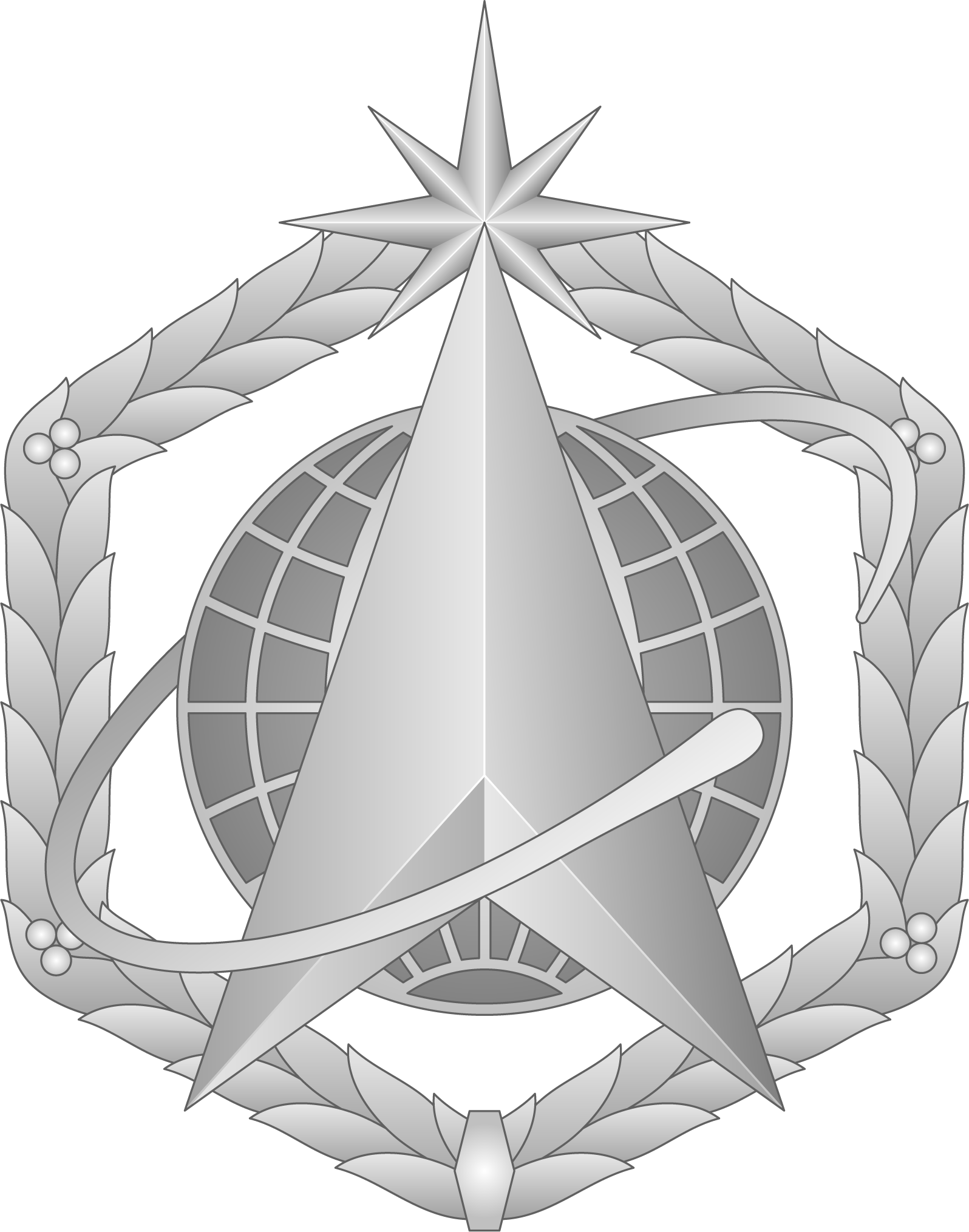
- CMSSF service cap badge

- CMSSF flag

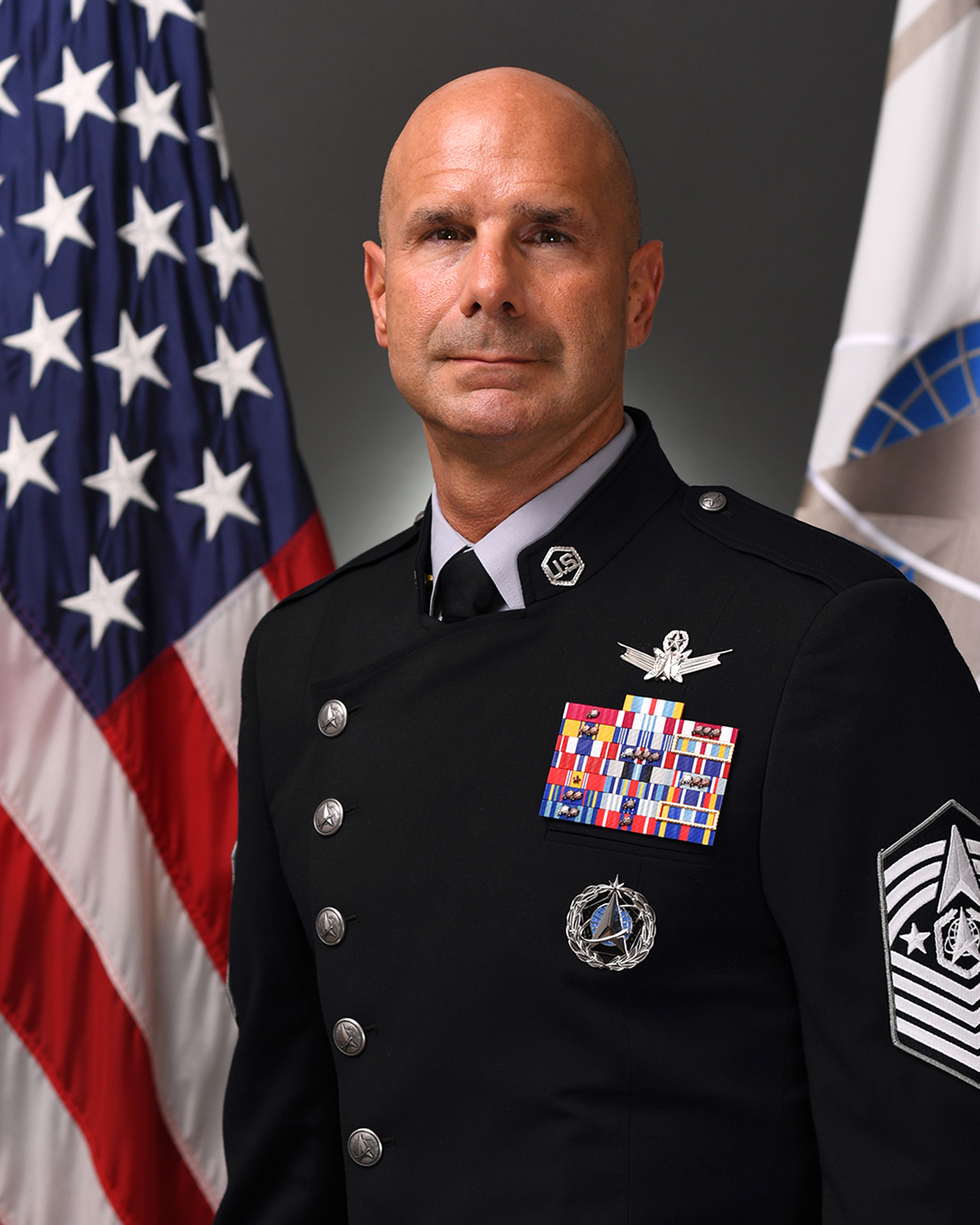
- Incumbent; John F. Bentivegna since 15 September 2023
- United States Space Force; Space Staff
- Style: Chief
- Type: Senior enlisted advisor
- Abbreviation: CMSSF
- Member of: The Space Staff
- Reports to: Chief of Space Operations
- Residence: Joint Base Andrews, Maryland
- Appointer: Chief of Space Operations
- Formation: 3 April 2020
- First holder: Roger A. Towberman
- Salary: $10,758.00 per month, regardless of the incumbent's service longevity
- Website: Official Website

The chief master sergeant of the Space Force (CMSSF) is the senior enlisted advisor to the chief of space operations and the secretary of the Air Force. The chief master sergeant of the Space Force is the most senior enlisted guardian in the U.S. Space Force, unless an enlisted guardian is serving as the senior enlisted advisor to the chairman.

== Appointment and responsibilities ==
The chief of space operations appoints the chief master sergeant of the Space Force and is designated a special paygrade above E-9. To be appointed, the appointee must have at least 22 years of service and must have been a chief master sergeant for at least three years.

The chief master sergeant of the Space Force is the highest noncommissioned officer in the Space Force. The chief serves as the senior enlisted advisor to both the chief of space operations and the secretary of the Air Force on all matters regarding the welfare, readiness, morale, proper utilization, and progress of Space Force enlisted members and their families.

== History ==
The inaugural chief master sergeant of the Space Force, Chief Master Sergeant Roger A. Towberman, was sworn in on 3 April 2020, having previously served as the command chief master sergeant of the Air Force Space Command, and concurrently serving as the senior enlisted leader of the United States Space Command. In addition to being the first chief master sergeant of the Space Force, he is also the second member of the Space Force and its first enlisted member.

The position was originally known as the senior enlisted advisor of the Space Force (SEASF) from 3 April 2020 until it was renamed on 1 February 2021 to chief master sergeant of the Space Force (CMSSF).

In 2023, five chief master sergeants were considered to replace Towberman, who was slated to retire. They went through a series of tests, which included an interview by an occupational psychologist, a mock U.S. Congress testimony, a mock town hall with airmen, and an interview with senior Space Force officials, that would guide General B. Chance Saltzman's selection. On May 5, 2023, Saltzman selected John F. Bentivegna to replace Towberman and serve as the second chief master sergeant of the Space Force. His assignment was announced on May 8, 2023.

== Insignia ==
The first rank insignia worn by the chief master sergeant of the Space Force, was based upon the rank insignia of the Air Force's chief master sergeant rank insignia, with other components, such as the two stars, designed to be consistent with the senior enlisted advisor rank of the other services. The delta, orbit, and globe elements at the center of the rank were taken from the seal of the United States Space Force. However, unlike the insignia of the Chief Master Sergeant of the Air Force which has a Laurel wreath around the central star within the rockers, the CMSSF insignia does not. On 20 September 2021, new insignia for all enlisted in the Space Force was introduced, including the CMSSF.

Rank insignia

2020–2021

2021–present

== List of chief master sergeants of the Space Force ==
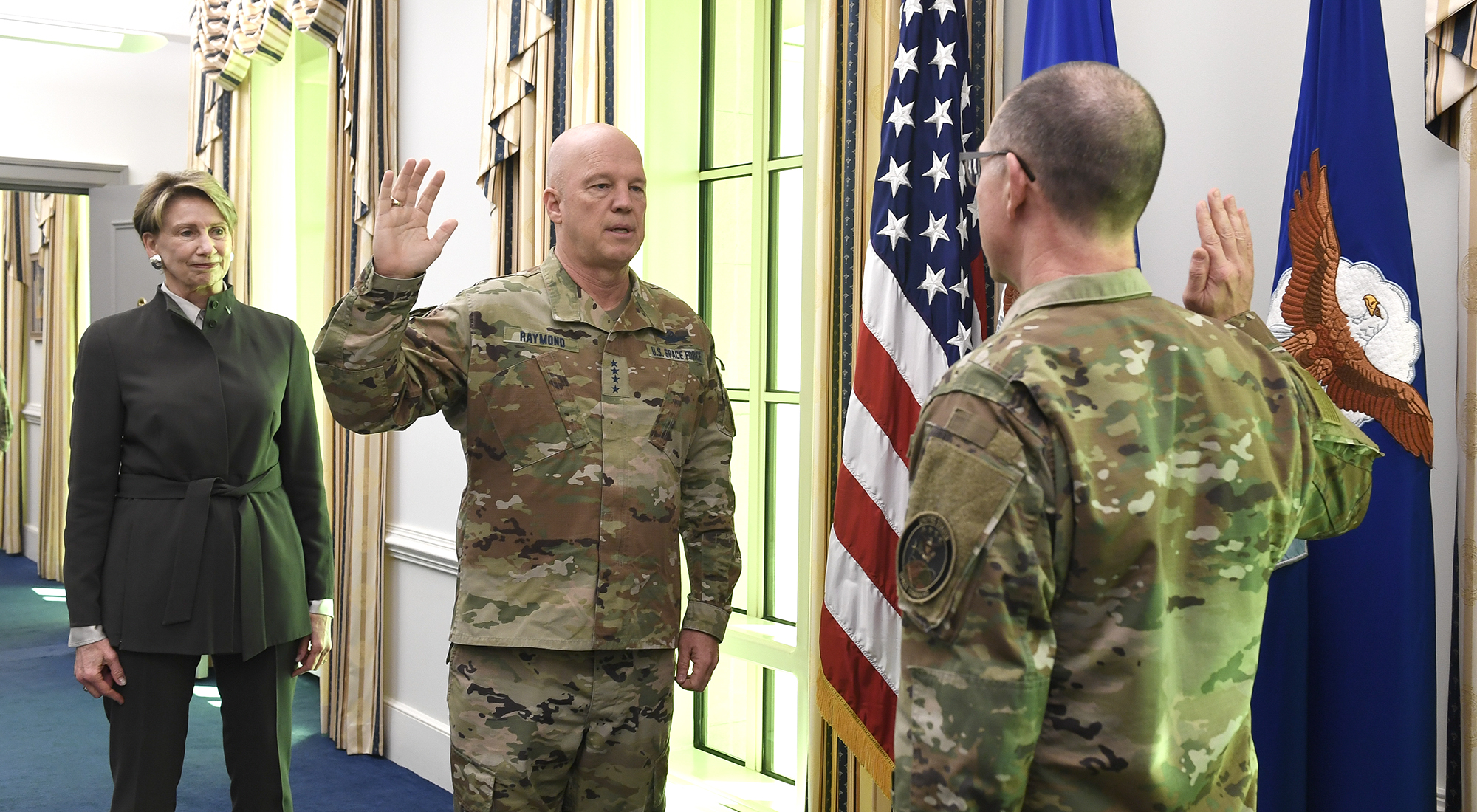
General John W. Raymond, Chief of Space Operations, swears in Roger A. Towberman as the first senior enlisted advisor of the Space Force while Secretary of the Air Force Barbara Barrett looks on, April 3, 2020.

No.	Portrait	Name	Term			Chief of Space Operations	Ref.
No.	Portrait	Name	Took office	Left office	Duration	Chief of Space Operations	Ref.
1	Roger A. Towberman	Chief Master Sergeant; Roger A. Towberman (born 1967/1968)	3 April 2020	15 September 2023	3 years, 165 days	John W. Raymond; B. Chance Saltzman	
2	John F. Bentivegna	Chief Master Sergeant; John F. Bentivegna (born c. 1976)	15 September 2023	Incumbent	3 years, 56 days	B. Chance Saltzman; Douglas Schiess	

== Heritage portraits ==
Former chief master sergeants of the Space Force have portraits on permanent display in the Pentagon.

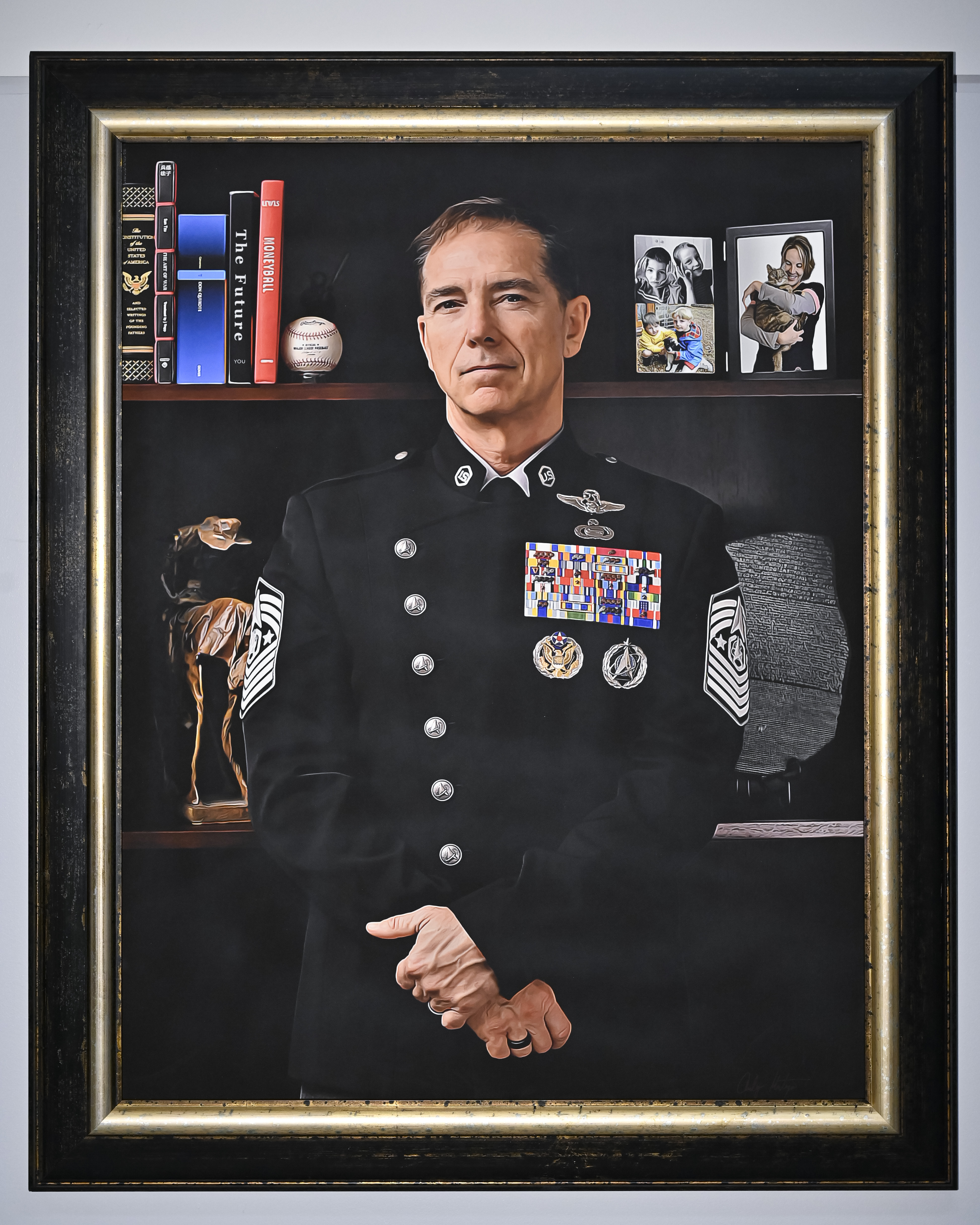
CMSSF Roger A. Towberman (2020–2023)

== See also ==
- Senior Enlisted Advisor to the Chairman
- Sergeant Major of the Army
- Command Sergeant Major of the US Army Reserve
- Sergeant Major of the Marine Corps
- Chief Master Sergeant of the Air Force
- Master Chief Petty Officer of the Navy
- Master Chief Petty Officer of the Coast Guard
- Master Chief Petty Officer of the Coast Guard Reserve Force
- Senior Enlisted Advisor for the National Guard Bureau
