= Cennini =

Cennini (pronounced [tʃenˈniːni]) is an Italian surname from Tuscany, derived from the medieval given name Cenni. Notable people with the name include:

- Bernardo Cennini (c. 1414 – c. 1498), Italian goldsmith, sculptor and printer
- Cennino Cennini (c. 1360 – before 1427), Italian painter
- Domenico Cennini (1606–1684), Italian Roman Catholic prelate
- Francesco Cennini de' Salamandri (1566–1645), Italian Roman Catholic cardinal

== See also ==
- Cellini
