= Hajj Muhammad Legenhausen =

American philosopher

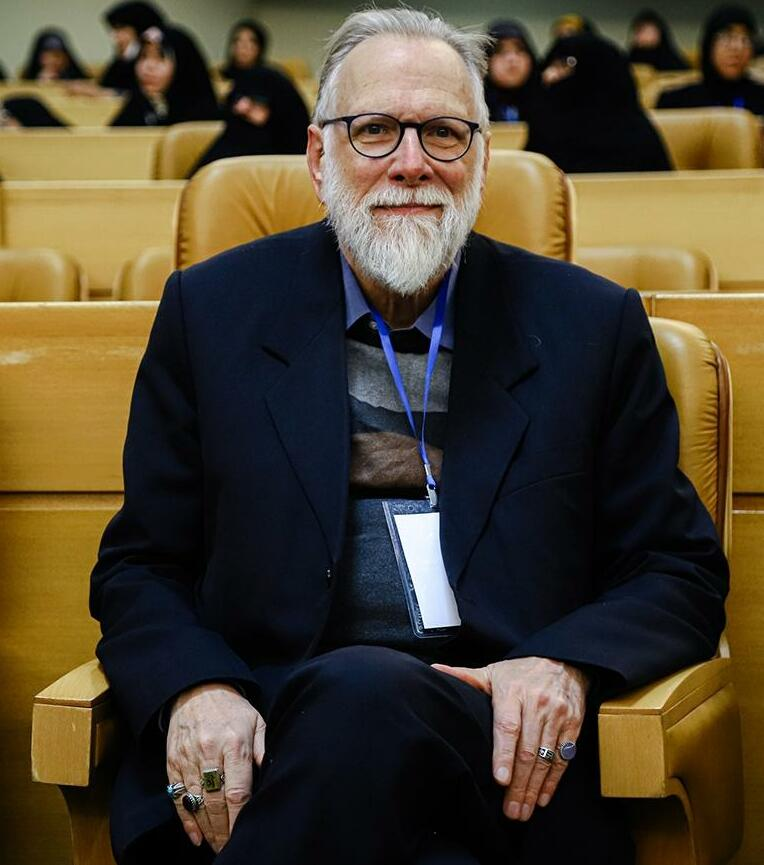
- Born: Gary Carl Legenhausen; May 3, 1953 (age 73); New York City
- Spouse: Narjes (Heidi) Javandel
- Parent(s): Carl, Marilyn

Education
- Education: Rice University (PhD), State University of New York at Albany (BA)
- Thesis: Matters of Substance (1983)
- Doctoral advisor: Baruch A. Brody
- Other advisors: Richard Grandy, Ermanno Bencivenga, Carlo Borromeo Giannoni, Kenneth Stern

Philosophical work
- Institutions: Imam Khomeini's Educational and Research Institute
- Main interests: Philosophy of religion, epistemology, moral philosophy

Hajj Muhammad Legenhausen (born May 3, 1953) is an American philosopher and professor of philosophy at the Imam Khomeini's Educational and Research Institute.

== Early life and education ==
Legenhausen was brought up as a Catholic but abandoned religion shortly after beginning his academic studies at the State University of New York at Albany. He holds a Ph.D. in philosophy from Rice University, completed in 1983.

== Conversion to Islam ==
In 1979, while teaching at Texas Southern University (1979–1989), he became acquainted with Islam through Muslim students. His exposure to Shi’a Islam eventually led to his conversion in 1983.

== Academic career ==
He taught philosophy of religion, ethics, and epistemology at the Islamic Iranian Academy of Philosophy from 1990 to 1994. Since 1996, he has been teaching Western philosophy and Christianity, and studying Islam at the Imam Khomeini Education and Research Institute in Iran.

== Affiliations and views ==
Legenhausen is a proponent of interfaith dialogue and serves on the advisory board of the Society for Religious Studies in Qom. He is also a founding member of the advisory board of the Shi`ite Studies Center in Qom, and serves on the scientific board of the Human Rights Center of Mofid University, Qom.

He is the author of Islam and Religious Pluralism, where he defends the idea of "non-reductive religious pluralism".

== Bibliography ==
- Mesbah Yazdi, M.T., Philosophical Instructions (translation by Muhammad Legenhausen & Azim Sarvdalir) Binghamton University & Brigham Young University, 1999, ISBN 1-883058-75-9.
- Jesus through the Qur'an and Shi'ite Narrations (translation by Muhammad Legenhausen & Muntazir Qa'im), Tahrike Tarsile Qur'an, Inc., 2005, ISBN 1-879402-14-9 (translated into Indonesian and Russian; the Russian translation won a Russian Publishers' Association book award).
- Islam and Religious Pluralism, London: Al-Hoda, 1999, ISBN 1-870907-03-5 (translated into Persian, Arabic and Indonesian)
- Contemporary Topics of Islamic Thought, Tehran: Al-Hoda, 2000, ISBN 964-472-230-2; (translated into Persian)
- "A Muslim's Proposal: Non-Reductive Religious Pluralism".
- Philosophical Instructions: An Introduction to Contemporary Islamic Philosophy
- Soul: A Comparative Approach
- Proofs for the Existence of God: Contexts – Structures – Relevance
- Substance and Attribute: Western and Islamic Traditions in Dialogue
- Contemporary Topics of Islamic Thought
- Hermeneutical Foundations for Islamic Social Sciences
- Islam versus Feminism
- Spirituality in Shi’i Islam: An Overview
- The ‘Irfan Of The Commander Of The Faithful, Imam ‘Ali, Peace Be With Him
- 'Allamah Tabataba'i's Footnote to Mulla Sadra's Proof of the Sincere
- Jesus as Kalimat Allah, The Word of God
- Hegel's Ethics
- Does God Have a Mind?
- Spirituality in Modern Philosophy: Hegel's Spirituality
