= Cenni =

Cenni (pronounced [ˈtʃenni]) is an Italian medieval male given name (a contraction of Bencivenni, lit. 'I came here well'), now surviving as a surname in Tuscany and Emilia-Romagna. Notable people with this name include:

== Given name ==
- Cenni di Francesco (fl. 1369–1415), Italian painter
- Cenni di Pepo (c. 1240–1302), better known as Cimabue, Italian painter and designer of mosaics

== Surname ==
- Adrian "Wildman" Cenni, American adventurer and off-road truck racer
- Giovanni Cenni (1881–1957), Italian chess master
- Giuseppe Cenni (1915–1943), Italian aviator and military officer
- Maurizio Cenni (born 1955), Italian politician
- Quinto Cenni (1845–1917), Italian painter, engraver, lithographer and illustrator
- Roberto Cenni (born 1972), Italian politician
- Susanna Cenni (born 1963), Italian politician
- Valentina Cenni (born 1982), Italian artist and actress

== See also ==
- Bencivenni
- Bencivenga
- Cennini
