= Mohammad Ali Shomali =

Muslim scholar, academic, philosopher and theologian

- محمدعلى شمالى

Personal life
- Born: 22 December 1965 (age 60) Tehran, Iran
- Main interest(s): Philosophy, Theology, Ethics Fiqh, Usul al-Fiqh
- Education: Qom Seminary; Tehran University (BA & MA); University of Manchester (PhD)

Religious life
- Religion: Islam
- Website: https://shomali.net/

Mohammad Ali Shomali (Persian: محمدعلى شمالى; born 22 December 1965) is a Muslim scholar, academic, philosopher and theologian. His religious rank is Hujjat al-Islam.

== Early life and education ==
Shomali was born 1965 in Tehran, Iran. He studied in the religious seminaries of Qom, and also completed a bachelors and masters degree in Western Philosophy from the University of Tehran. He then received his doctorate in Philosophy from the University of Manchester. Shomali's thesis was on ethical relativism, and his postdoctoral research was on ethical issues related to life and death.

== Posts ==
Shomali currently holds a number of posts including:

- Founding Director at the International Institute for Islamic Studies in Qom, Iran.
- Head of the Imam Khomeini's Educational and Research Institute religious department.
- Editor-in-chief to the Message of Thaqalayn Journal and the Spiritual Quest Journal.

He was the resident alim, and director of the Islamic Centre of England in London, from 2014 until 2019.

== Works ==
Shomali is Interested in effective participation through attending or organising interreligious dialogue in UK, in addition to Several countries such as USA, Canada, and several European countries and some of Asian countries.

=== Co-edited ===
==== Catholics-Shi'a Dialogue volumes ====
Shomali has an active role in the realm of interfaith dialogue between Shiite scholars and Catholic theologians. As such, he organised meetings together with members of the Monastic Interreligious Dialogue in which Christian monks and Shia scholars came together in Rome (2011), Qom/Isfahan (2012), Assisi/Rome (2014), and Qom/Mashhad (2016). Together with Abbott Dr Timothy Wright he won the Award for Book of the Year in the Special Session Interreligious Dialogue: Islam and Christianity in The 24th World Award for Book of the Year of the Islamic Republic of Iran 2017. Shomali has contributed to editing the following books in collaboration with Abbott Timothy Wright and other scholars and theologians:

- Catholics & Shi'a in Dialogue: (Studies in Theology & Spirituality) (2004 & 2011).
- Studies in Theology & Spirituality Catholic-Shi'a Engagement: (Reason & Faith in Theory and Practice) (2006 & 2011).
- A Catholic-Shi‘a Dialogue: (Ethics in Today’s Society) (2008 & 2011).
- Mohammad, Ali Shomali (2012). Monks and Muslims: monastic and Shi'a spirituality in dialogue. Liturgical Press. ISBN 978-0-814-63442-4.
- Monks and Muslims III : towards a global Abrahamic community (2015)

==== Protestant-Shi'a Dialogue volumes ====
- Faith and Modernity: A Muslim-Christian Conversation (2018) (Co-author)

=== Publications ===
- Mohammad, Ali Shomali (2008). "Human Nature and Nature of Morality". The Pennsylvania State University CiteSeerX Archives.
- Mary, Jesus and Christianity: an Islamic Perspective, 2007 ISBN 978-1-907-91703-5
- Mohammad, Ali Shomali (2008). "Islamic bioethics: a general scheme". Journal of Medical Ethics and History of Medicine. 1: 1–8. ISSN 2008-0387. PMC 3713653. PMID 23908711.
- Mohammad, Ali Shomali (2008). "The Meaning of the term Shi'a". The Pennsylvania State University CiteSeerX Archives.
  - Mohammad, Ali Shomali; Ghodratollah, Momeni (2013). "بررسی تئوری‌های اخلاقی پایه و اصول اخلاق پزشکی". Vesnu Publications. 31 (258): 1756–1768. ISSN 1027-7595.
- Mohammad, Ali Shomali (2013). "A Probe into the Concept of Friendship in the Qur'ān". University of Religions and Denominations. 2 (3): 79–90. ISSN 2322-4894.
- Shomali, Mohammad Ali (2014). Discovering Shi'a Islam. p. 187.
- Mohammad, Ali Shomali (2018). "The People of the Book: A Qur'anic Perspective". Consensus.
- Shomali, Mohammad Ali (2019). The Second Fatimah: The Spiritual Role of Lady Ma'sumah and a Study of Her Ziyarah. p. 130. ISBN 978-1-073-63863-5.
- Shomali, Mohammad Ali (2020). Self-Knowledge. p. 130. ISBN 978-1-956-27616-9.
- Self Development: Essays on Islamic Spirituality, 2016 ISBN 978-1-904-93411-0
- Ethical Relativism: An Analysis of the Foundations of Morality
- Shi‘a Islam: Origins, Faith & Practices 2003 ISBN 978-1-904-06311-7
- Principles of Jurisprudence: An Introduction to Methodology of Fiqh
- The Image of God in the Qur’an
- Spiritual Quest: A Biannual Journal of Ethics and Spirituality, 2013
- God: Existence & Attributes, 2014
- Shomali, Mohammad Ali (2020). Lessons on Knowing the Qur'an. Risalat International Institute. ISBN 978-1-838-07790-7.
- Islamic Belief System, 2020
- Lessons on Imamah and Wilayah, 2019 ISBN 978-1-904-93428-8
- Islamic Plan for Life, 2020
- Lessons on Islamic Beliefs, 2020
- Unity of God and Unity in God: Wings of Unity Series, Part One
- Apostle of God
- Islam: Doctrines, Practices & Morals

Some of his books have been translated and published into several languages.
