= Scott Stalker =

American governmental official

Scott H. Stalker
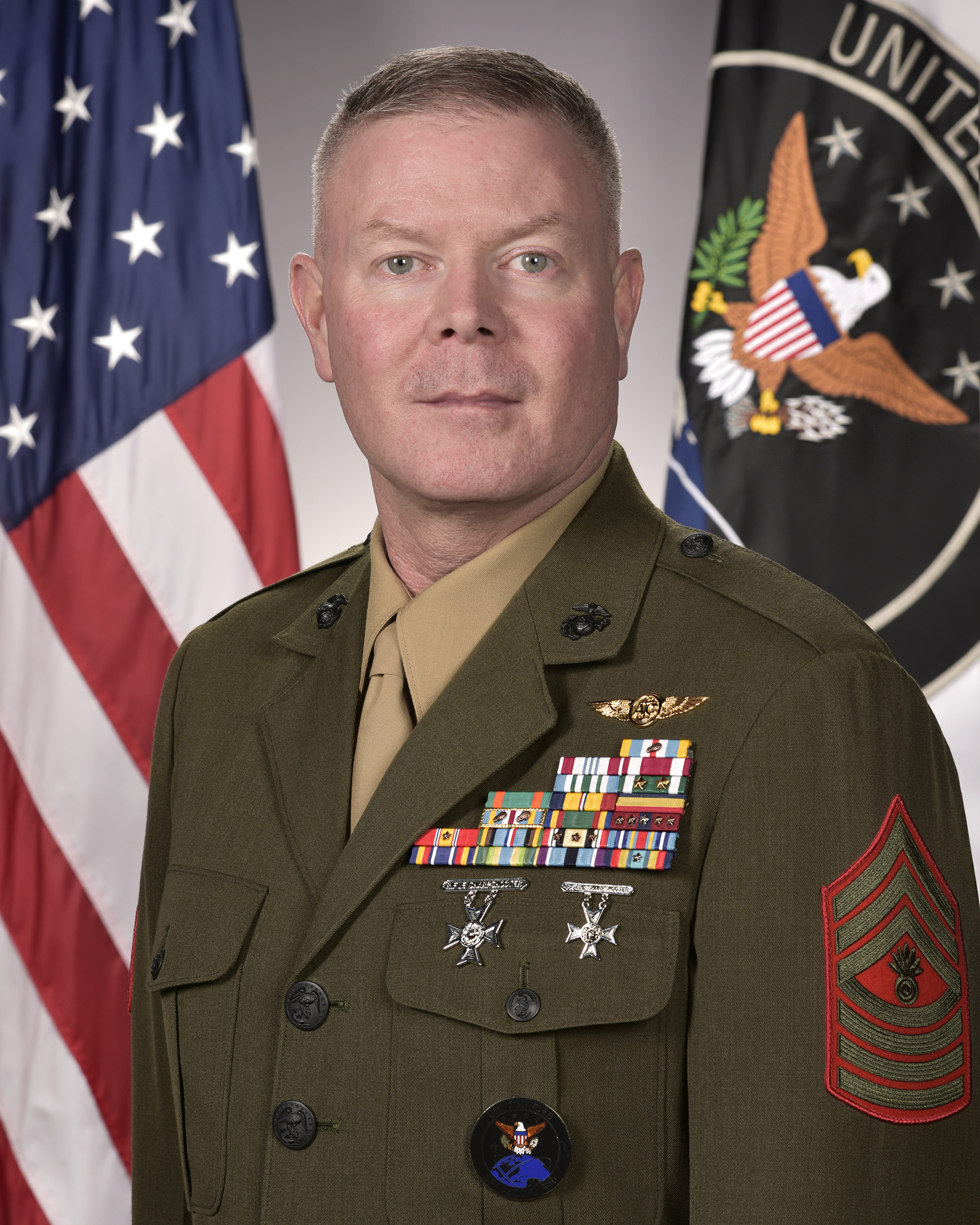
- Official portrait, 2023
- Born: 1975 (age 50–51); Lebanon, New Hampshire
- Spouse: Malerie B. Stalker
- Military career
- Allegiance: United States
- Branch: United States Marine Corps
- Service years: 1993–2023
- Rank: Master Gunnery Sergeant
- Units: United States Space Command; United States Cyber Command; National Security Agency; Central Security Service; Defense Intelligence Agency
- Conflicts: Operation Restore Hope; Operation Deny Flight; Operation Provide Promise; Operation Silver Wake; Operation Guardian Retrieval; Operation Iraqi Freedom
- Awards: Defense Superior Service Medal

Scott H. Stalker (born 1975) is a retired United States Marine Corps Master Gunnery Sergeant who last served as the Command Senior Enlisted Leader (CSEL) of the United States Space Command. Before, he has been the Command Senior Enlisted Leader (CSEL) of the United States Cyber Command, the National Security Agency (NSA) and the Central Security Service (CSS) in Fort Meade, Maryland, serving from March 16, 2018, until August 28, 2020. He was the first to hold the position of CSEL for all three agencies during their career. He has served in multiple military operations throughout his career.

== Career ==
Stalker was born in Lebanon, New Hampshire, in 1975 and enlisted in the United States Marine Corps in January 1993. After recruit training, he attended Marine Combat Training, followed by the Basic MAGTF Intelligence Analyst Course at Virginia Beach, Virginia.

Stalker's joint operational deployments include tours with the U.S. Army's 25th Infantry Division and 101st Airborne Division, the U.S. Navy's USS Guam LPH-9, USS Nassau LHA-4, USS Nashville LPD-13, and USS Blue Ridge LCC-19, and the U.S. Air Force's 31st OSS.

His deployments with the Marine Corps include tours with HMM-365, Marine All Weather Fighter Attack Squadron 332, 26 MEU (SOC), 1st Battalion, 7th Marines, RCT-7, 1st Marine Division, 2nd Marine Division, and 3rd Marine Division. Additionally, he deployed multiple times to Southeast Asia while assigned to the Joint POW/MIA Accounting Command.

His combat and contingency deployments include Operation Restore Hope in Somalia; Deny Flight and Operation Provide Promise in Bosnia and Herzegovina; Operation Silver Wake, conducting a non-combatant evacuation operation in Albania; Operation Guardian Retrieval in the Democratic Republic of the Congo; and a unit deployment program in Okinawa, Japan. He also served as part of Operation Iraqi Freedom, where he was a member of a border patrol advisory team, training Iraqi soldiers in the north of the country, as regimental intelligence chief, and was involved in the military investigation of the Salman Pak facility.

Additional garrison assignments include Joint Intelligence Center Pacific, Marine Corps Intelligence Activity, Marine Corps Forces Special Operations Command, Marine Corps Cyberspace Command, the Senior Enlisted Advisor to the Joint Chiefs of Staff J2, and most recently as the Command Senior Enlisted Leader of the Defense Intelligence Agency until 2018, (Note: Stalker was replaced by Benjamin J. Higginbotham in February 2018.) the first Marine to hold that position. Stalker is the first individual to have held both positions within their career as both the DIA and NSA CSEL. As DIA CSEL Stalker coordinated with senior military officials from all branches of services to address ongoing intelligence-related threats.

In June 2020, it was announced that Stalker would succeed Roger A. Towberman as the senior enlisted leader for United States Space Command.

== Military training ==
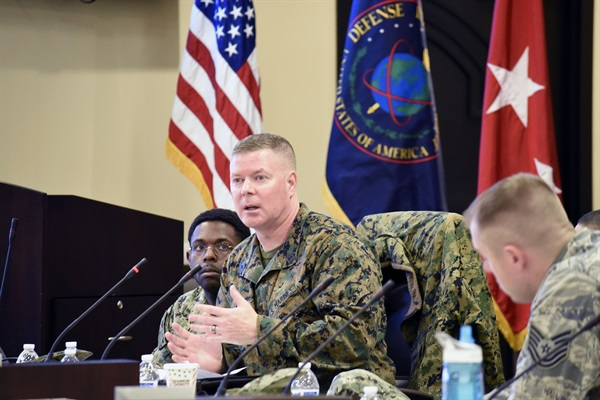
Stalker speaking at the DIA enlisted workforce at Joint Base Andrews in December 2017

Stalker is a graduate of the MAGTF Basic and Intelligence Chief's Course (honor graduate), Marine Corps Martial Arts Green Belt Instructor course, Army Air Assault School (top 3 graduate), SNCO Advanced and Career Course (distinguished graduate), Warfighter PME, Joint Advanced Cyber Warfare Course, Sr. Enlisted Joint PME I & II, and the National Defense University's KEYSTONE, and is a Special Operations Capability Specialist. He earned a Bachelor of Arts from American Military University in intelligence analysis and completed a leadership certificate at Harvard's Kennedy School of Government in June 2018. He is currently completing a graduate program where he plans to receive a Master of Science degree in Cyber Security in late 2020. In 2001, he received a letter of commendation from the director of the Central Intelligence Agency.

== Awards and decorations ==
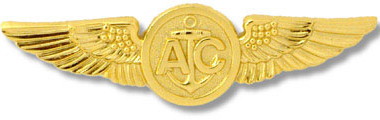

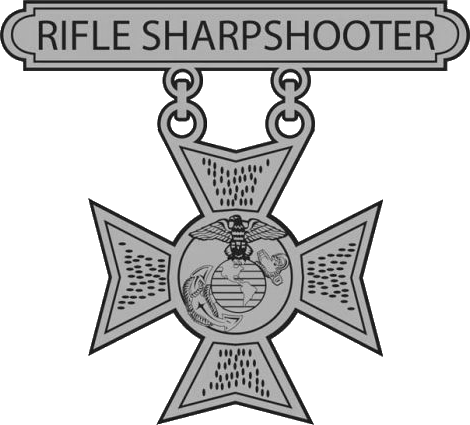

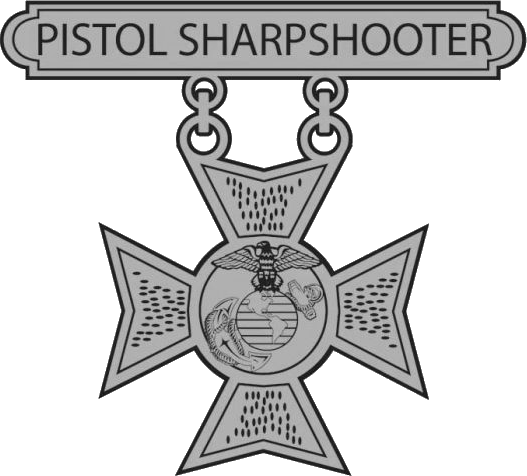

Badge	Naval Aircrew Badge			
1st row	Defense Superior Service Medal		Defense Meritorious Service Medal	Meritorious Service Medal with one gold award star
2nd row	Joint Service Commendation Medal	Navy and Marine Corps Commendation Medal with two award stars	Joint Service Achievement Medal	Navy and Marine Corps Achievement Medal
3rd row	Army Achievement Medal	Combat Action Ribbon with award star	Navy Presidential Unit Citation	Joint Meritorious Unit Award with three bronze oak leaf clusters
4th row	Navy Unit Commendation	Navy Meritorious Unit Commendation	Marine Corps Good Conduct Medal with one silver and three bronze service stars	National Defense Service Medal with service star
5th row	Armed Forces Expeditionary Medal	Iraq Campaign Medal with three service stars	Global War on Terrorism Expeditionary Medal	Global War on Terrorism Service Medal
6th row	Armed Forces Service Medal	Humanitarian Service Medal	Navy Sea Service Deployment Ribbon with one silver and three bronze service stars	NATO Medal for Yugoslavia
Badges	Marine Corps Rifle Sharpshooter Badge			Marine Corps Pistol Sharpshooter Badge
Badge	United States Space Command Badge			

- Stalker has earned 7 service stripes.

== Personal life ==
He is married to Malerie B. Stalker from Manassas, Virginia. They live in Maryland with their daughter, Olivia, and three English Bulldogs.

== Notes ==
Military offices
Preceded by Arleen K. Heath	Command Senior Enlisted Leader of the Defense Intelligence Agency; 2016–2018	Succeeded by Benjamin J. Higginbotham
Preceded by David Redmond	Command Senior Enlisted Leader of the United States Cyber Command, National Security Agency, and Central Security Service; 2018–2020	Succeeded by Sheryl D. Lyon
Preceded by Roger A. Towberman	Command Senior Enlisted Leader of the United States Space Command; 2020–2023	Succeeded by Jacob C. Simmons
