= John F. Bentivegna =

US Space Force non-commissioned officer

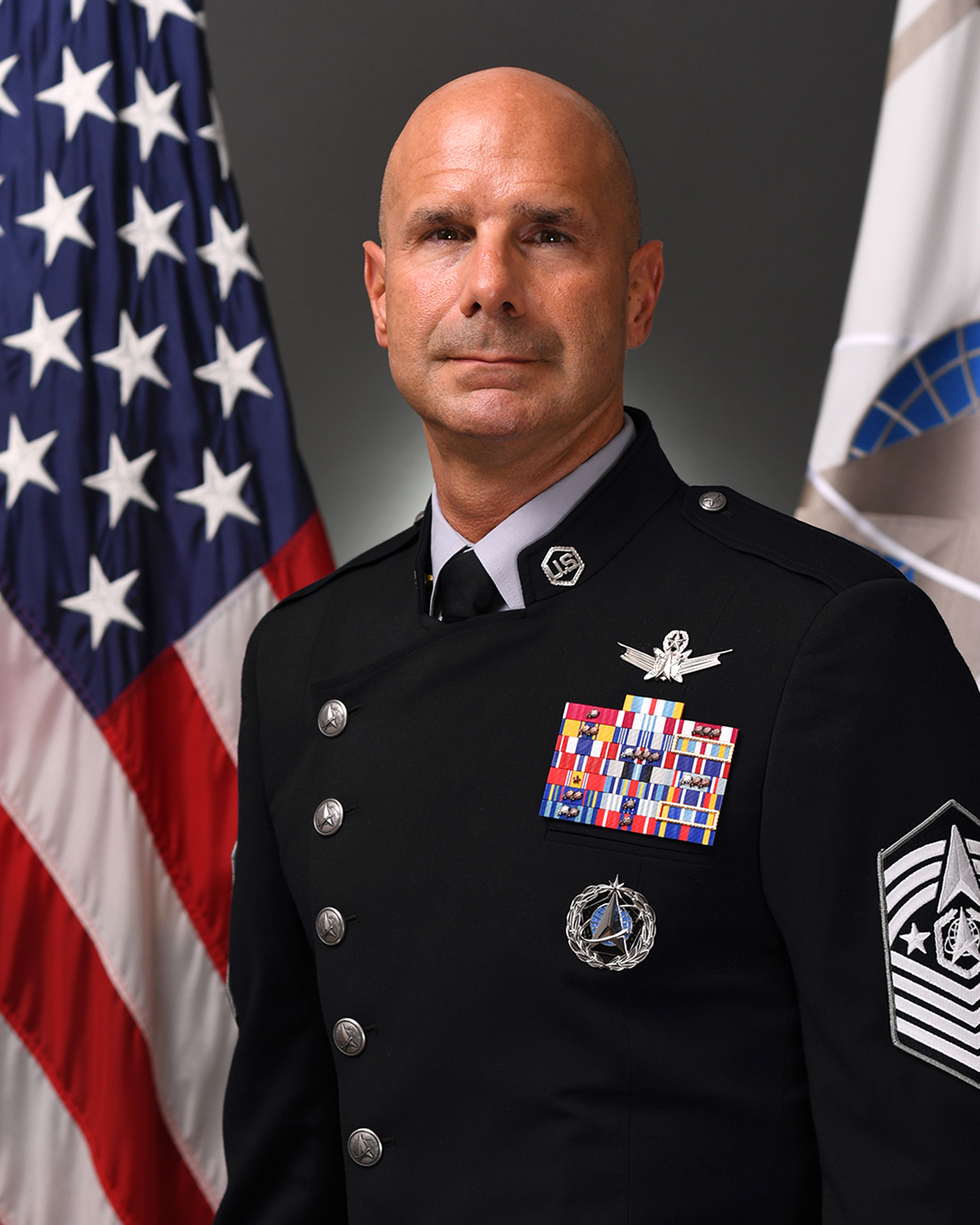
- Official portrait, 2023
- Born: c. December 14, 1976 (age 49); Jersey City, New Jersey, U.S.
- Education: American Military University (BA)
- Military career
- Allegiance: United States
- Branch: United States Air Force (1994–2020); United States Space Force (2020–present)
- Service years: 1994–present
- Rank: Chief Master Sergeant of the Space Force
- Nickname: B-9
- Units: Space Operations Command; 14th Air Force; National Reconnaissance Office; 50th Space Wing; 460th Operation Group; 76th Space Control Squadron; 527th Space Aggressor Squadron
- Awards: Defense Superior Service Medal; Legion of Merit (2)

Signature
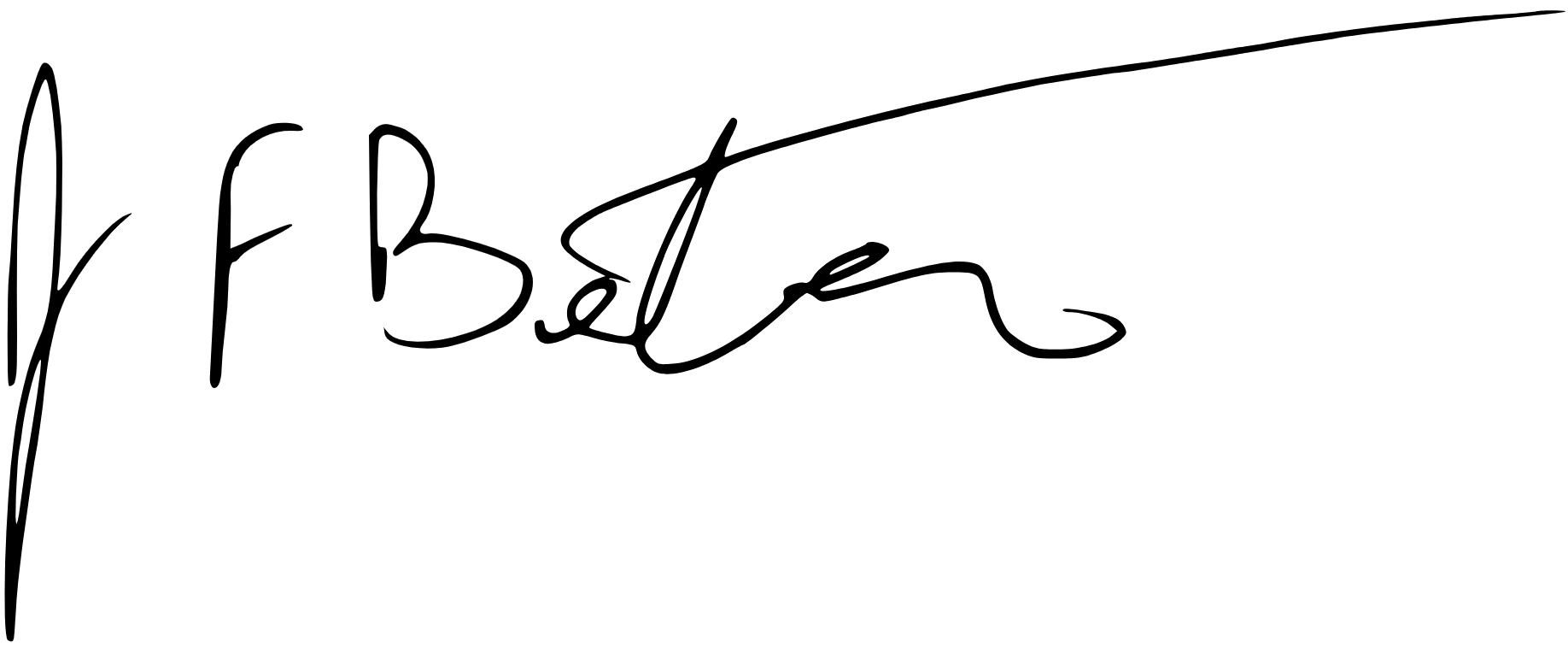

John F. Bentivegna (born c. December 14, 1976) is a United States Space Force chief master sergeant who serves as the second and current chief master sergeant of the United States Space Force. He previously served as the senior enlisted advisor to the deputy chief of space operations for operations, cyber, and nuclear and senior enlisted leader of Space Operations Command.

== Education ==
- 1999 Airman Leadership School, Buckley Air Force Base, Colo.
- 2001 Advanced Space Operations Course, National Security Space Institute, Colo.
- 2001 Space in the Air Operations Center, National Security Space Institute, Colo.
- 2002 Associate Degree Electronic Systems Technology, Community College of the Air Force
- 2002 Associate Degree Space Operations Technologies, Community College of the Air Force
- 2004 Noncommissioned Officer Academy, Peterson AFB, Colo.
- 2008 United States Marine Corps Staff NCO Advanced Course, Quantico, Va.
- 2014 Professional Management Certificate, Community College of the Air Force
- 2015 Enterprise Leadership Seminar, Kenan-Flagler Business School, University of North Carolina, N.C.
- 2015 Senior Enlisted Legal Orientation Course, Maxwell AFB, Ala.
- 2016 Leadership Development Program, Center for Creative Learning
- 2016 AFSO21 Executive Leadership Course, University of Tennessee, Tenn.
- 2016 Enterprise Perspective Seminar, Alan L. Freed Associates, Washington, D.C.
- 2017 Senior Enlisted Joint Professional Military Education II
- 2018 KEYSTONE18-1 Fellow, National Defense University, Washington, D.C.
- 2022 Bachelors of Arts, Political Science, American Military University

== Military career ==
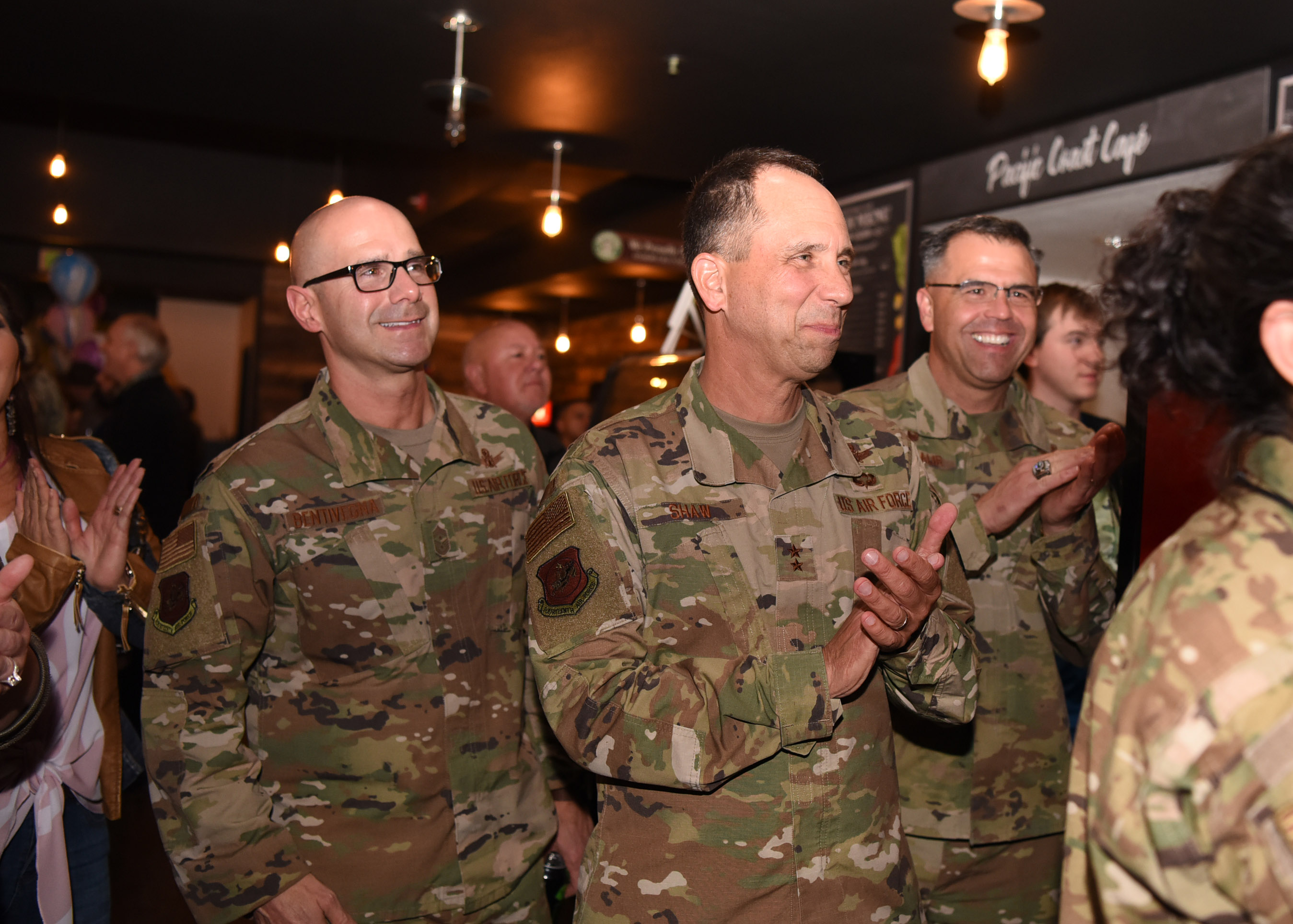
Bentivegna with Maj Gen John E. Shaw (center) and Col Anthony Mastalir (right) during the establishment of the U.S. Space Force, December 20, 2019

Bentivegna enlisted into the United States Air Force in 1994. From August to October of that year, he went through basic military training at Lackland Air Force Base, Texas. After that, he was assigned to the Precision Measurement Equipment Laboratory School at Keesler Air Force Base, Mississippi. From 1995 to 1998, he worked as a precision measurement equipment technician at McGuire Air Force Base, New Jersey.

Bentivegna then shifted to the space operations career field starting as ground systems operator for the Defense Support Program at Buckley Air Force Base, Colorado, from 1998 to 2002. From 2002 to 2003, he served as noncommissioned officer in charge for operations training at Clear Air Force Station, Alaska. After that, he was then selected to serve as superintendent for the 527th Space Aggressor Squadron at Schriever Air Force Base, Colorado. He stayed there until 2007, when he was assigned as superintendent for the Mission Management Division at the Aerospace Data Facility-Colorado. From 2010 to 2013, he served as superintendent for the 76th Space Control Squadron at Peterson Air Force Base, Colorado.

In October 2010, Bentivegna returned to Buckley Air Force Base and started serving as superintendent for the 460th Operations Group. After that tour, he went back to Schriever Air Force Base in 2015, now as command chief master sergeant for the 50th Space Wing. In 2017, he was stationed at the Pentagon as the chief of the Air Force enlisted force development. From 2017 to 2019, he served as the command chief of the National Reconnaissance Office.

In February 2019, Bentivegna started serving as the command chief of the Fourteenth Air Force and the senior enlisted leader of the Combined Force Space Component Command. On 21 October 2020, during the activation of Space Operations Command, he became the senior enlisted leader of the new field command. In June 2022, he went back to the Pentagon to serve as the senior enlisted advisor to the deputy chief of space operations for operations, cyber and nuclear, Lieutenant General B. Chance Saltzman. When Saltzman became the chief of space operations, Bentivegna continued serving the role of senior enlisted advisor to Lieutenant General DeAnna Burt.

Bentivegna was one of five chief master sergeants considered to replace Roger A. Towberman as chief master sergeant of the Space Force who retired in 2023. On May 5, 2023, General B. Chance Saltzman selected Bentivegna to replace Towberman and serve as the second chief master sergeant of the Space Force. His assignment was announced on May 8, 2023.

In May 2026, Bentivenga's official Instagram account of the Chief Master Sergeant of the Space Force was hacked by pro-Iranian hackers. The Space Force acknowledged the breach via a spokesman and Bentivenga stated the need for cybersecurity.

== Awards and decorations ==
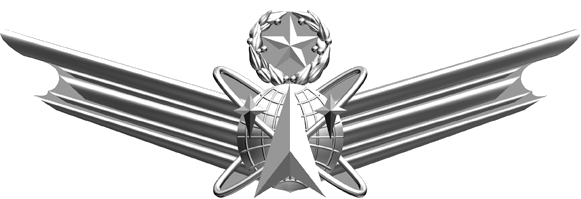

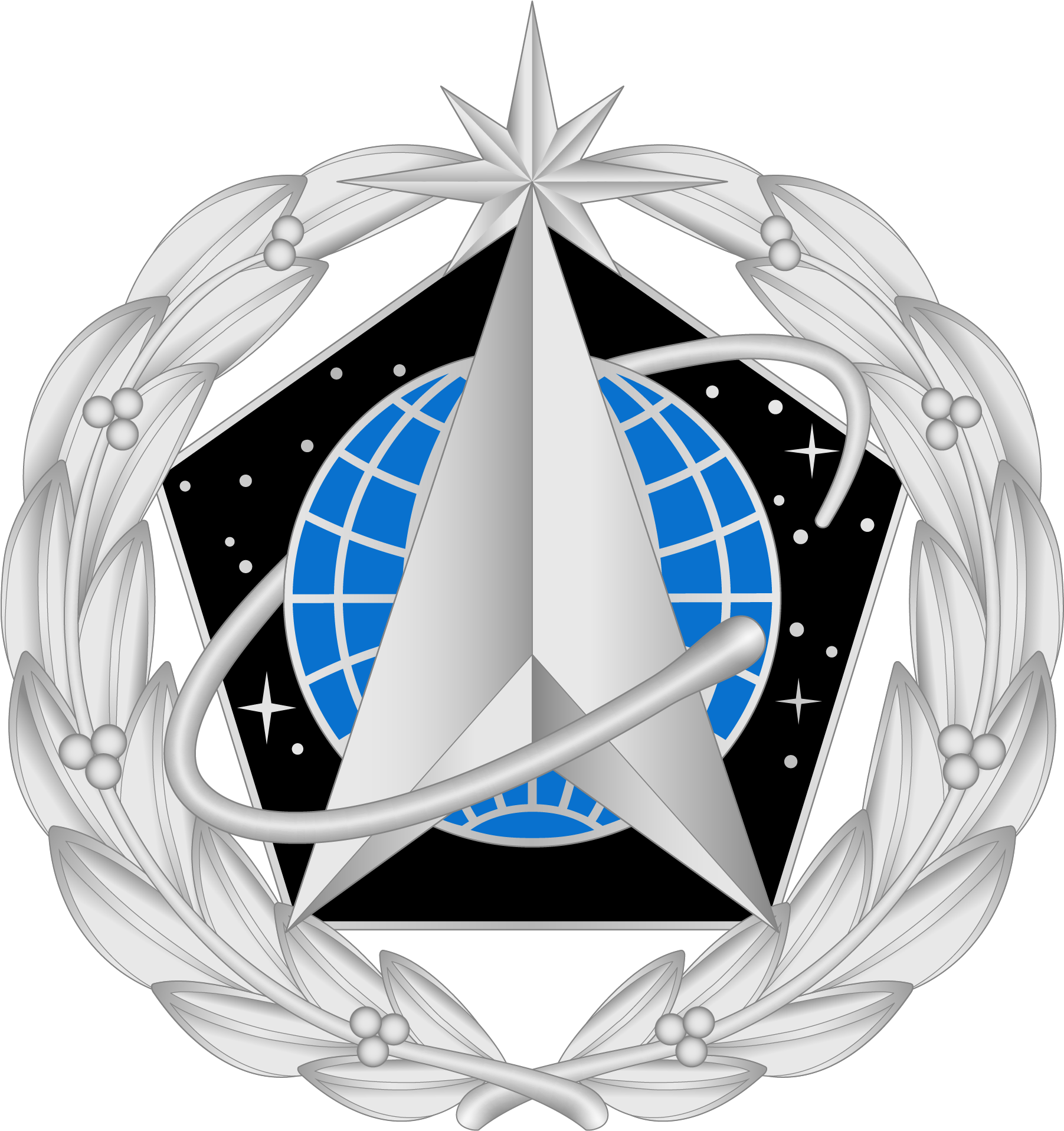

Command Space Operations Badge
Space Staff Badge

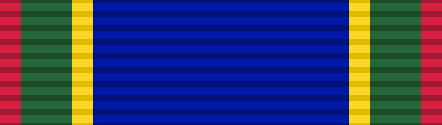
Defense Superior Service Medal
Legion of Merit with one bronze oak leaf cluster
Defense Meritorious Service Medal
Meritorious Service Medal with three bronze oak leaf clusters
Air Force Commendation Medal with three bronze oak leaf clusters
Air Force Achievement Medal
Joint Meritorious Unit Award
Air Force Meritorious Unit Award
Air Force Outstanding Unit Award with one silver and three bronze oak leaf clusters
Air Force Outstanding Unit Award
Air Force Organizational Excellence Award
Space Force Good Conduct Medal
Air Force Good Conduct Medal with one silver and two bronze oak leaf clusters
National Reconnaissance Office Distinguished Service Medal (gold medal)
National Defense Service Medal with one bronze service star
Global War on Terrorism Expeditionary Medal
Global War on Terrorism Service Medal
Nuclear Deterrence Operations Service Medal with two bronze oak leaf clusters
Air Force Overseas Short Tour Service Ribbon with one bronze oak leaf cluster
Air Force Expeditionary Service Ribbon with gold frame
Air Force Longevity Service Award with one silver and one bronze cluster
Air Force NCO PME Graduate Ribbon with one bronze oak leaf cluster
Air Force Training Ribbon

Military offices
Preceded by Roger A. Towberman	Chief Master Sergeant of the Space Force; 2023–present	Incumbent
