= Partow-e Sokhan =

Persian-language newspaper

Partow Sokhan
- Type: Weekly newspaper
- Owner: Imam Khomeini Educational Research Institute
- Editor: Qasem Ravanbakhsh
- Launched: 1998
- Political alignment: Radical right
- Language: Persian
- City: Qom
- Country: Iran
- Website: partosokhan.ir

Partow-e Sokhan (Persian: پرتو سخن, lit. 'Radiation of Speech') is a Persian language weekly newspaper published by the Imam Khomeini Educational Research Institute in Qom.
