= Chief of Space Operations =

Senior-most officer and service chief of the United States Space Force

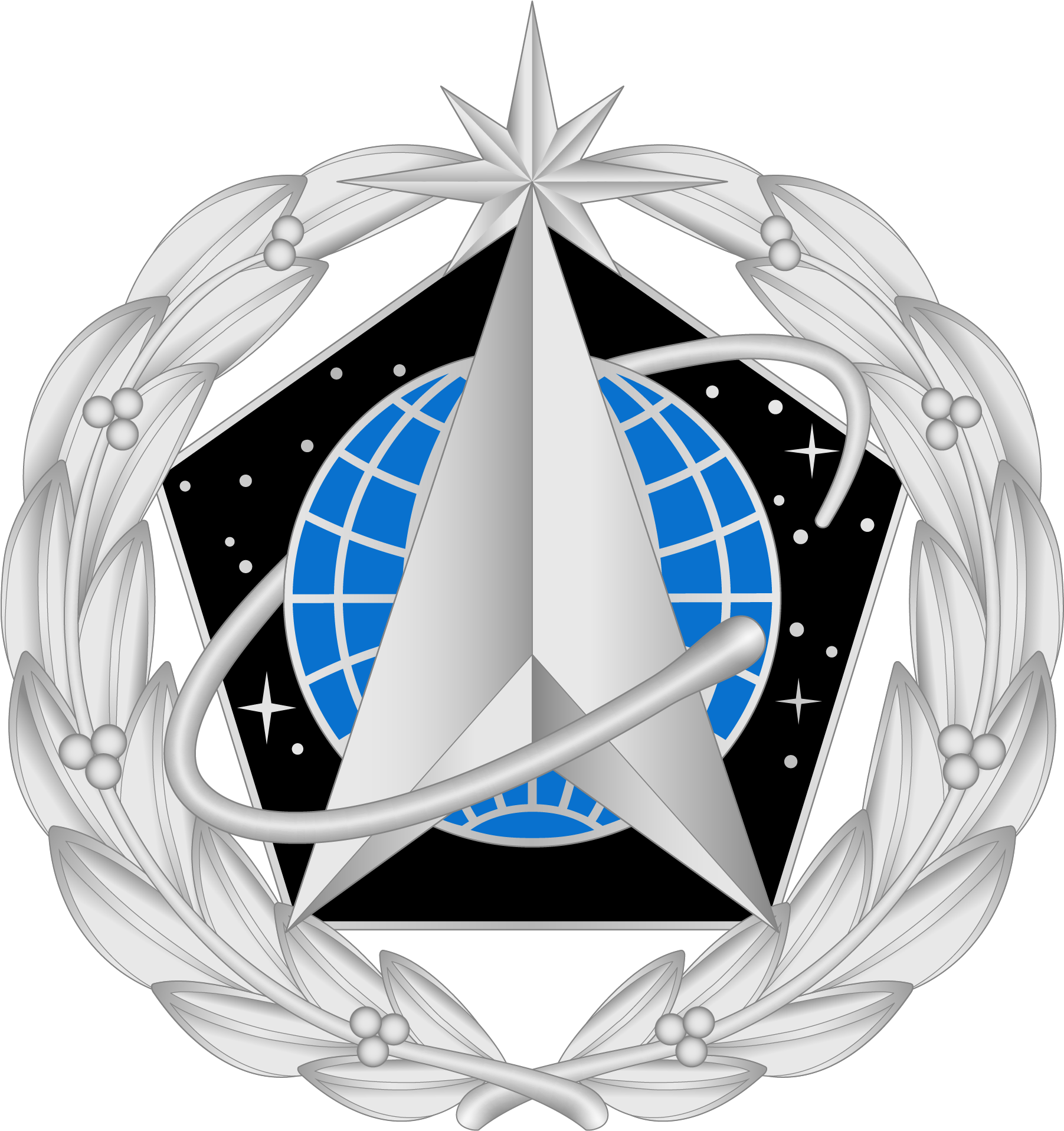
- Space Staff identification badge

- CSO flag

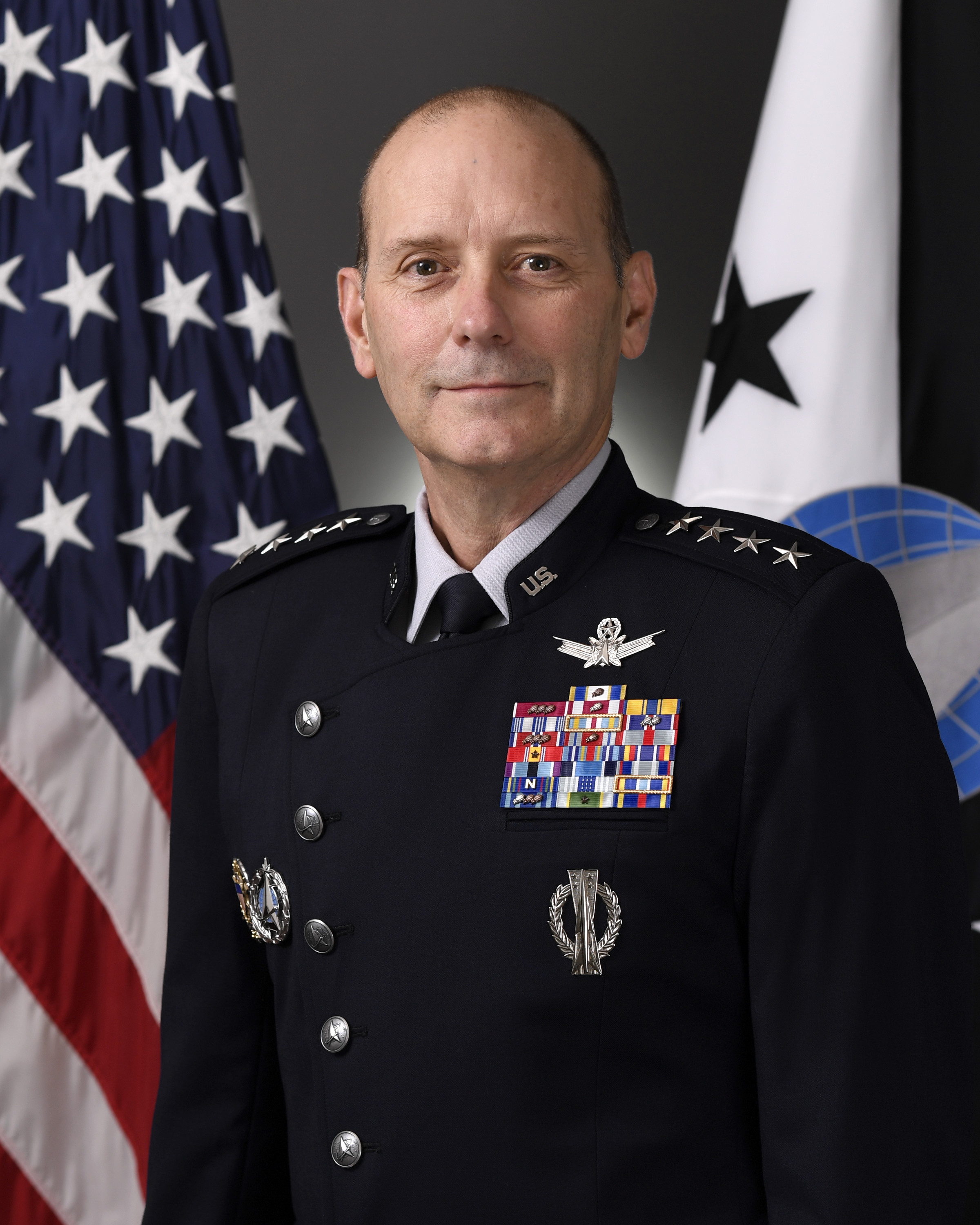
- Incumbent; General Douglas Schiess since 3 September 2026
- United States Space Force; Space Staff
- Type: Service chief
- Abbreviation: CSO
- Member of: Joint Chiefs of Staff; Space Staff
- Reports to: Secretary of Defense; Secretary of the Air Force
- Residence: Space House, Joint Base Anacostia-Bolling, Washington, D.C.
- Seat: The Pentagon, Arlington County, Virginia
- Appointer: The president; with Senate advice and consent
- Term length: 4 years; Renewable one time, only during war or national emergency
- Constituting instrument: 10 U.S.C. § 9082
- Formation: 20 December 2019
- First holder: John W. Raymond
- Deputy: Vice Chief of Space Operations

The chief of space operations (CSO) is the service chief of the United States Space Force. The CSO is the principal military adviser to the secretary of the Air Force for Space Force operations and, as a member of the Joint Chiefs of Staff, a military adviser to the National Security Council, the secretary of defense, and the president. The CSO is a statutory office held by a Space Force general, who is typically the highest-ranking officer on active duty in the Space Force. (Note: Unless the chairman or vice chairman of the Joint Chiefs of Staff is a Space Force officer.)

The CSO is an administrative position based in the Pentagon, and while they do not have operational command authority over Space Force forces, the chief of space operations does exercise supervision of Space Force units and organizations as the designee of the secretary of the Air Force.

== Appointment, rank, and responsibilities ==
=== Appointment ===
The chief of space operations is nominated for appointment by the president, for a four-year term of office, and must be confirmed by the Senate. The chief can be reappointed to serve one additional term, but only during times of war or national emergency declared by Congress. By statute, the chief is appointed as a four-star general.

=== Responsibilities ===
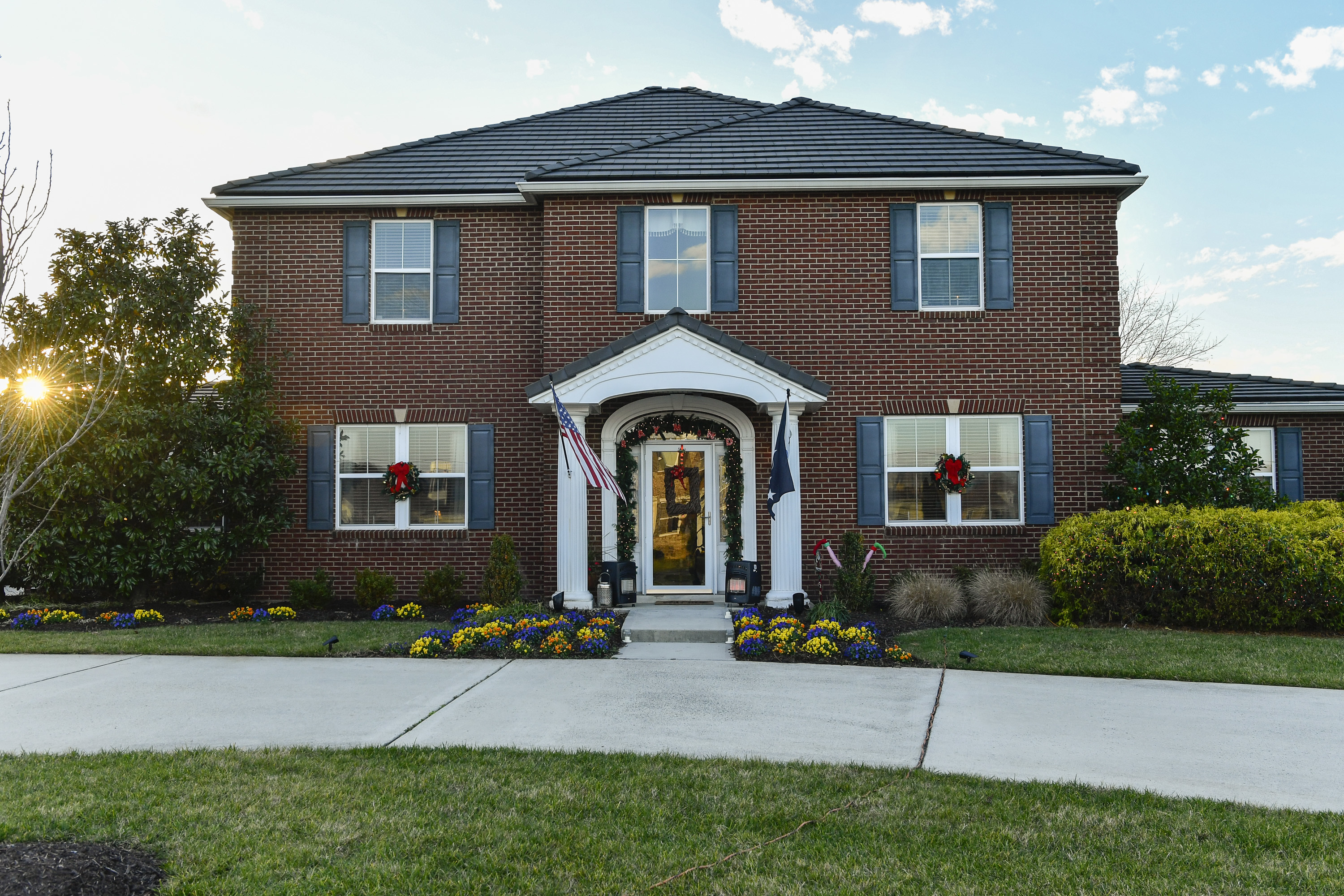
Space House, the residence of the chief of space operations, at Joint Base Anacostia-Bolling, Washington, D.C.

==== Department of the Air Force ====
Under the authority, direction and control of the secretary of the Air Force, the chief of space operations presides over the Space Staff, acts as the secretary's executive agent in carrying out approved plans, and exercises supervision over organizations and members of the Space Force as determined by the secretary. The chief of space operations may also perform other duties as assigned by either the president, the secretary of defense or the secretary of the Air Force.

==== Member of the Joint Chiefs of Staff ====
The chief of space operations became a statutory member of the Joint Chiefs of Staff on 20 December 2020. When performing duties as a member of the Joint Chiefs, the chief of space operations is responsible directly to the secretary of defense. Like the other members of the Joint Chiefs of Staff, the CSO is an administrative position, with no operational command authority over Space Force forces.

== History ==
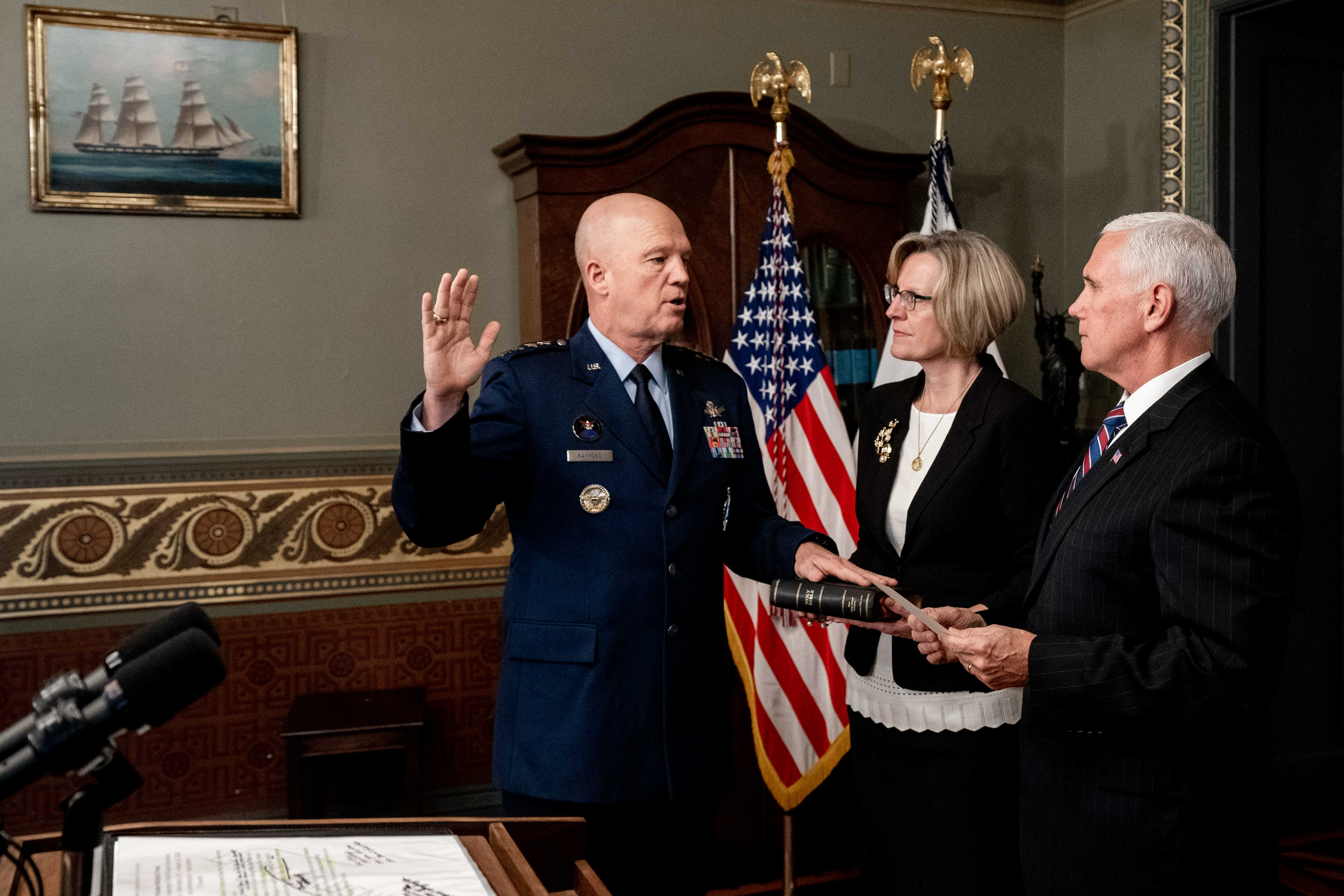
U.S. Vice President Pence swearing in Raymond as the Space Force's inaugural CSO.

The post of chief of space operations was created on 20 December 2019, along with the United States Space Force, with the signing of the National Defense Authorization Act for Fiscal Year 2020. General John W. Raymond, the commander of US Space Command and Air Force Space Command, was announced as the first chief of space operations on that same day. On 14 January 2020, Raymond was sworn in as the first chief of space operations by Vice President Mike Pence.

On 20 December 2020, the CSO officially became the 8th member of the Joint Chiefs of Staff. Raymond was inducted to the body in a ceremony on 11 December 2020.

== Space Staff ==
The Office of the Chief of Space Operations, or more commonly referred to as the Space Staff, is the headquarters for the Space Force. It is responsible for organizing, training, and equipping of the Space Force cooperating with the Air Staff on support issues. It is headed by the chief of space operations and the vice chief of space operations, both four-star generals, and the chief master sergeant of the Space Force. There is also a director of staff who oversees the staff action group, protocol, information technology and administration, resources, and total force integration groups. The chief of space operations also has four deputy chiefs of space operations.

The CSO personal office is composed of the following:

- Chief of Space Operations (CSO): Gen Douglas Schiess
  - Vice Chief of Space Operations (VCSO): Gen Shawn Bratton
  - Chief Master Sergeant of the Space Force (CMSSF): CMSSF John F. Bentivegna
  - Director of Staff (SF/DS)
  - Chief, CSO Strategic Initiatives Group (SF/SIG):
  - Foreign Policy Advisor (POLAD):
  - Senior Executive Officer:

== List of chiefs of space operations ==
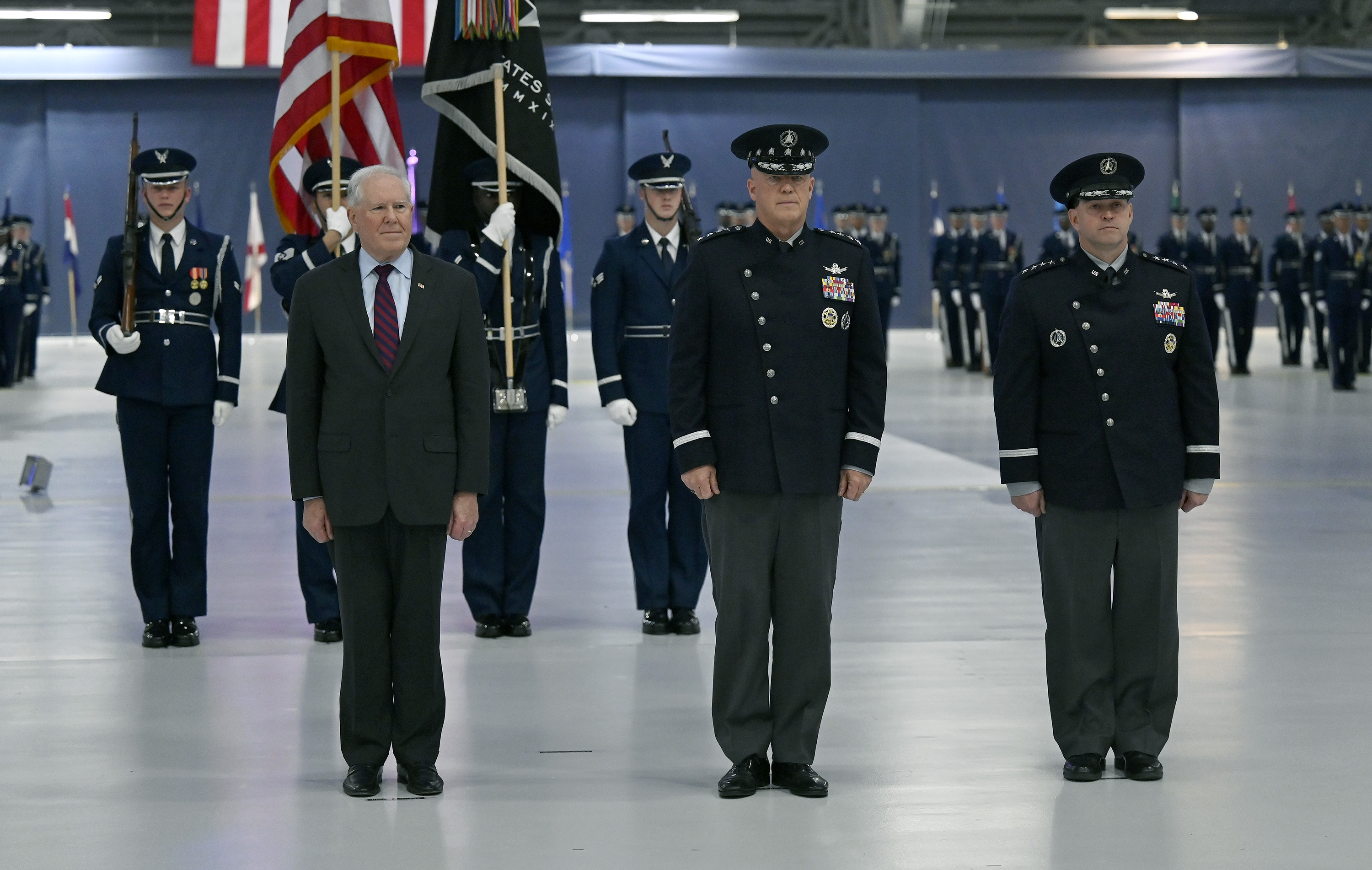
Raymond (center) transferred responsibility to Saltzman (right) in 2022 in the Space Force's first change of responsibility ceremony.

No.	Portrait	Name	Term			Secretaries served under:		Ref.
No.	Portrait	Name	Took office	Left office	Duration	Air Force	Defense	Ref.
1	John W. Raymond	General; John W. Raymond (born 1962)	20 December 2019	2 November 2022	2 years, 317 days	Barbara Barrett; Frank Kendall III	Mark Esper; Lloyd Austin	
2	B. Chance Saltzman	General; B. Chance Saltzman (born 1969)	2 November 2022	3 September 2026	3 years, 305 days	Frank Kendall III; Troy Meink	Lloyd Austin; Pete Hegseth	
3	Douglas Schiess	General; Douglas Schiess (born 1970)	3 September 2026	Incumbent	72 days	Troy Meink	Pete Hegseth	

== Heritage portraits ==
Former chiefs of space operations have portraits on permanent display in the Pentagon.

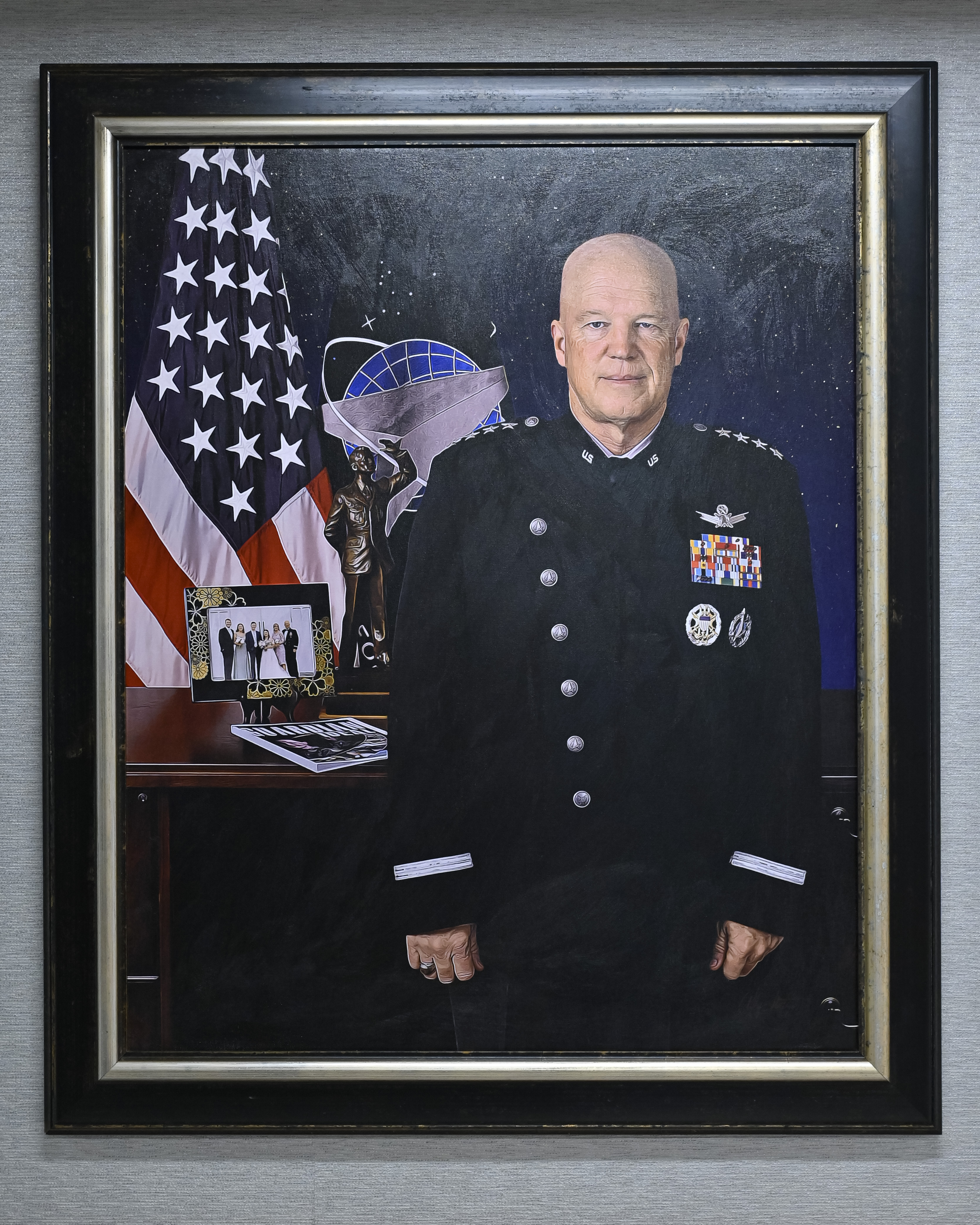
Gen John W. Raymond (2019–2022)

== See also ==
- Joint Chiefs of Staff
- Vice Chief of Space Operations
- Chief of Staff of the Air Force
