= Imam Khomeini's Educational and Research Institute =

Shia Islamic religious educational institute in Qom, Iran

Coordinates: 34.6290°N 50.8650°E

Imam Khomeini Education and Research Institute (also Imam Khomeini's Educational and Research Institute , Moassesseh-ye Amuzeshi va Pezhuheshi-ye Emam Khomeini) is a Shia Islamic religious educational institute in Qom, Iran. It was founded in 1991 by cleric Ayatollah Mohammad-Taqi Mesbah-Yazdi. who was the institute's director until his death.

The institute has been described by one source as being concerned with how Iran's Islamic government can adapt the fast-moving scientific and technological developments of the 21st century to its own needs, particularly by explaining scientific issues to leading Islamic religious scholars (marjas) and through these religious scholars bring the thinking of science to the masses of Muslims "so that Iranian scientists can operate on a par with other researchers anywhere in the world."

Another source describes the institute as having been founded to counteract the challenge to and criticism of the clerical leadership of the Islamic government by intellectuals such as Abdolkarim Soroush.

Some clergy at the institute reject the theory of evolution, but approve of other pursuits of science, such as sperm and embryo donation, cloning or surrogate motherhood, and embryonic stem cell research.

The institute publishes the weekly periodical, Parto-Sokhan.

== Departments ==
- Department of Contemporary Iranian Thought and History
- Department of Psychology
- Department of Educational Studies
- Department of Political Science
- Department of Philosophy
- Department of Qur’anic Exegesis and Sciences
- Department of Sociology
- Department of Law
- Department of Mysticism
- Department of Islamic Theology and Philosophy of Religion
- Department of Management
- Department of Religious Studies
- Department of Economics
- Department of Ethics
- Department of History

== Personalities ==
- Mahmoud Rajabi (Chancellor)
- Nasser Biria (The Vice President for Research)
- Sadeq Mousavi-Nasab (The Vice President for Education)
- Mohammad Ali Shomali (head of the institute's religious department)
- Muhammad Legenhausen, American-born convert to Islam. Since 1992, he has been studying Islam and teaching Western philosophy and Christianity at the Imam Khomeini Education and Research Institute in Iran.

== Publisher ==
The Imam Khomeini Education and Research publishes many books and magazine every year since it founded. The publisher of the institute is a separate department but under control of the institute. The publisher has gotten several appreciation medal while years. The last one is the position of the selected publisher at the 20th Conference of the Year of the Hawzah (2018).
