= Ermanno Bencivenga =

Italian philosopher

- Born: 1950 (age 75–76); Reggio Calabria

Academic background
- Education: University of Toronto (PhD)
- Thesis: Foundations of Free Logic (1977)

Academic work
- Era: 21st-century philosophy
- Region: Western philosophy
- Institutions: University of California, Irvine
- Main interests: logic, ethics, political philosophy

Ermanno Angelo Bencivenga is an Italian philosopher and Professor Emeritus of Philosophy at the University of California, Irvine. Bencivenga is known for his works on logic, ethics, and political philosophy.

== Biography ==
After graduating in philosophy from the State University of Milan, Bencivenga soon left Italy, moving first to Canada for PhD studies and then to the United States, where he embarked on his academic career teaching, since 1979, at the University of California, Irvine.

Several of his contributions have appeared over the years in various Italian newspapers like the La Stampa, il Sole 24 Ore, and l'Unità.

Since 2021 he hosts on the Italian television channel Byoblu the programs titled Spazio d'Illusione (Space of Illusion), dedicated to the history of cinema, and Spazio di Libertà (Space of Freedom), which is dedicated to philosophical issues.

He currently speaks Italian, English, French, Spanish, and German. He also knows Latin and Ancient Greek.

== Books ==
- Kant's Copernican Revolution. New York: Oxford University Press, 1987.
- Looser Ends: The Practice of Philosophy. Minneapolis: University of Minnesota Press, 1989.
- The Discipline of Subjectivity: An Essay on Montaigne. Princeton: Princeton University Press, 1990.
- Logic and Other Nonsense: The Case of Anselm and His God. Princeton: Princeton University Press, 1993.
- Philosophy in Play. Indianapolis: Hackett, 1994.
- My Kantian Ways. Berkeley: University of California Press, 1995.
- A Theory of Language and Mind. Berkeley: University of California Press 1997.
- Freedom: A Dialogue. Indianapolis: Hackett, 1997.
- Hegel's Dialectical Logic. New York: Oxford University Press, 2000.
- Exercises in Constructive Imagination. Dordrecht: Kluwer, 2001.
- Dancing Souls. Lanham (MD): Lexington Books, 2003.
- Ethics Vindicated: Kant's Transcendental Legitimation of Moral Discourse. New York: Oxford University Press, 2007.
- Theories of the Logos. Springer, 2017.
- Understanding Edgar Allan Poe: They Who Dream by Day. Newcastle upon Tyne UK: Cambridge Scholars, 2023.
