= Space Force Delta =

Official logo of the United States Space Force

Versions
- Alternative rendering

- Emblem application
- Adopted: 22 July 2020

The Space Force Delta is the official logo of the U.S. Space Force, the space warfare service branch of the U.S. Armed Forces. The delta itself was unveiled on 22 July 2020.

== Symbolism ==
- First used in 1961, the Delta symbol honors the heritage of the United States Air Force and Space Command.
- The silver outer border of the delta signifies defense and protection from all adversaries and threats emanating from the space domain.
- Inside the delta, the two spires represent the action of a rocket launching into the outer atmosphere in support of the central role of the Space Force in defending the space domain.
- The four beveled elements symbolize the joint armed forces supporting the space mission: Air Force, Army, Navy, and Marine Corps.
- In the center of the delta is the star Polaris, which symbolizes how the core values guide the Space Force mission.

== History ==
The Delta Symbol - An Origin Story

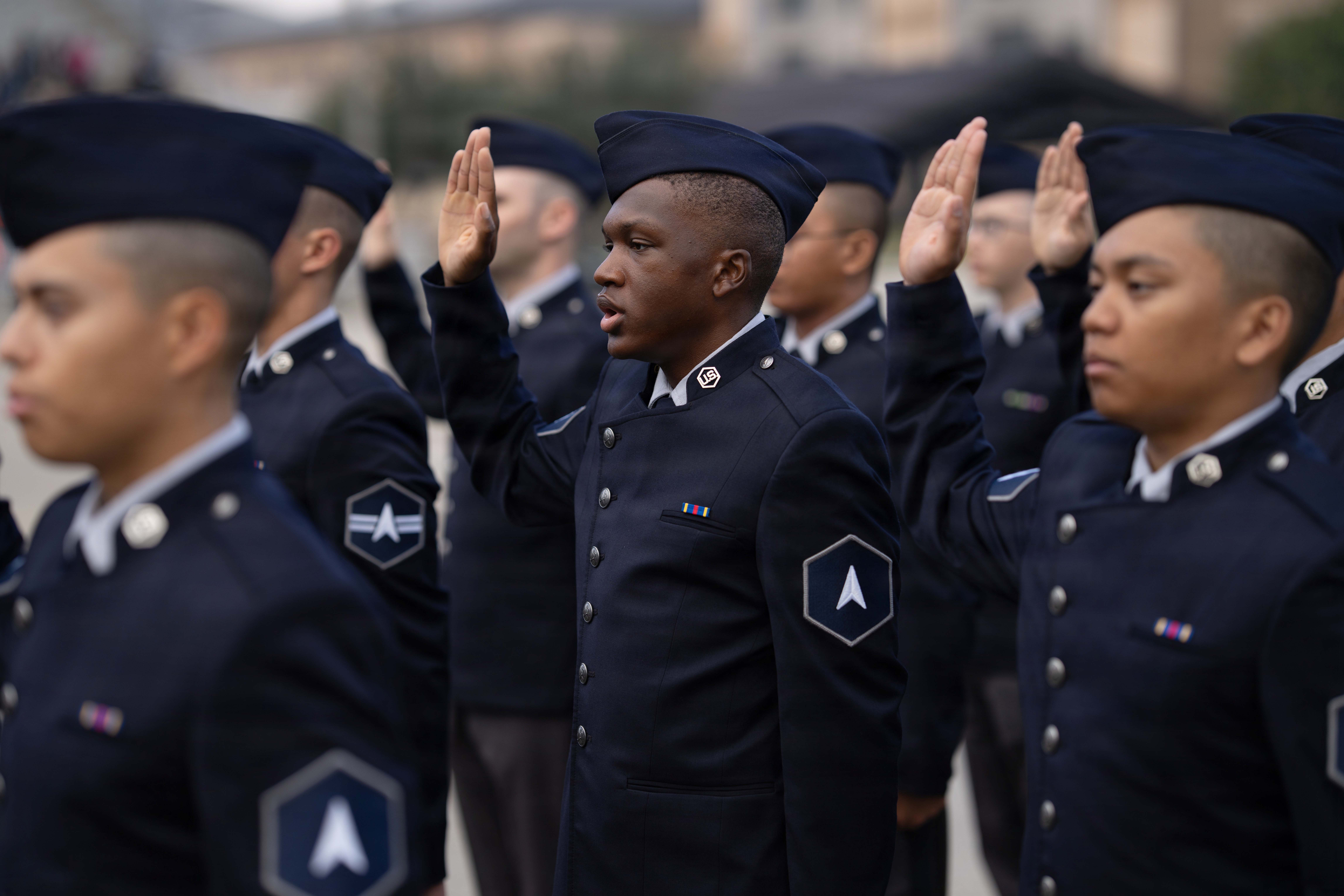
Space Force Guardians wearing the service dress uniform at Joint Base San Antonio, December 18, 2025.

The Space Force Delta was officially unveiled by the Senior Enlisted Advisor of the Space Force, CMSgt Roger A. Towberman on 22 July 2020, alongside the Space Force's motto Semper Supra, which translates to "Always Above". The delta symbol has a strong historical tradition in the Space Force, being first used by military space units in 1961 and also being used to identify the second highest echelon of Space Force units, as well as holding a central position in the Space Operations Badge, Space Force seal, and Space Force flag.

The seal and delta quickly gained social media notoriety, as individuals compared it to the seal of Starfleet from Star Trek; however, the Space Force refuted the notion, stating that the central delta insignia was first used in 1942 by the United States Army Air Forces, and then adopted by the Air Force's early space program in 1961, years before Star Trek debuted in 1966. A number of military commentators noted that it was likely that Star Trek derived its logo from Air Force Space Command, rather than the other way around.

== See also ==
- Ranks and insignia of space forces
- Prop and Wings
- Eagle, Globe, and Anchor
- NASA insignia
