= Ranks and insignia of space forces =

Comparison of ranks and insignia of all current and former space forces, to include aerospace forces and air and space forces. This excludes air forces with space units and formations.

== Ranks ==
=== Officers ===
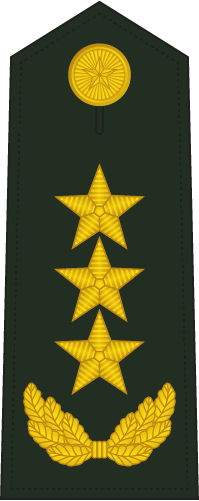
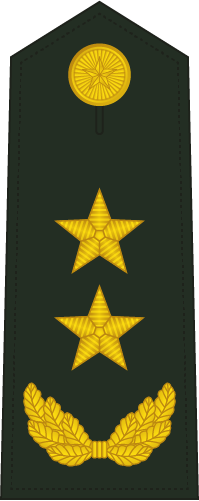
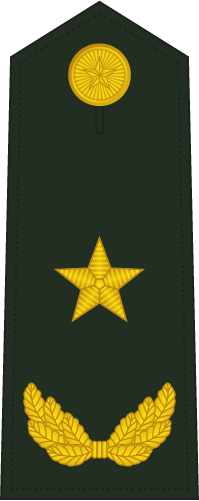
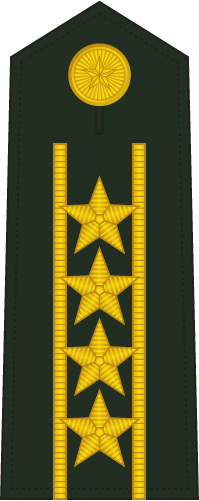
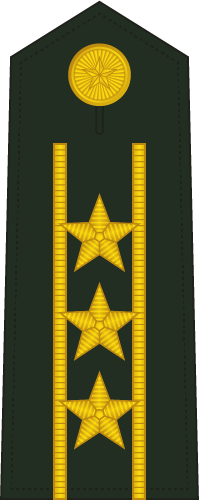
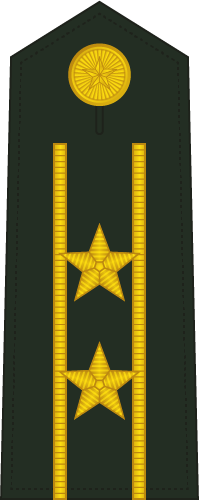
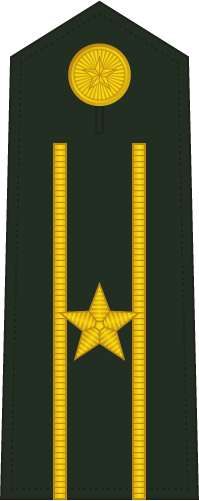
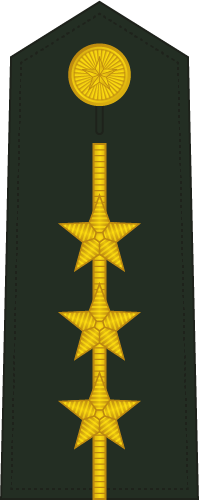
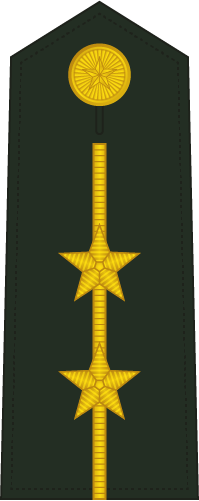
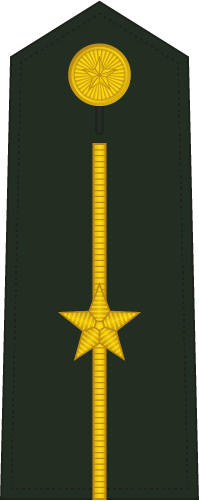
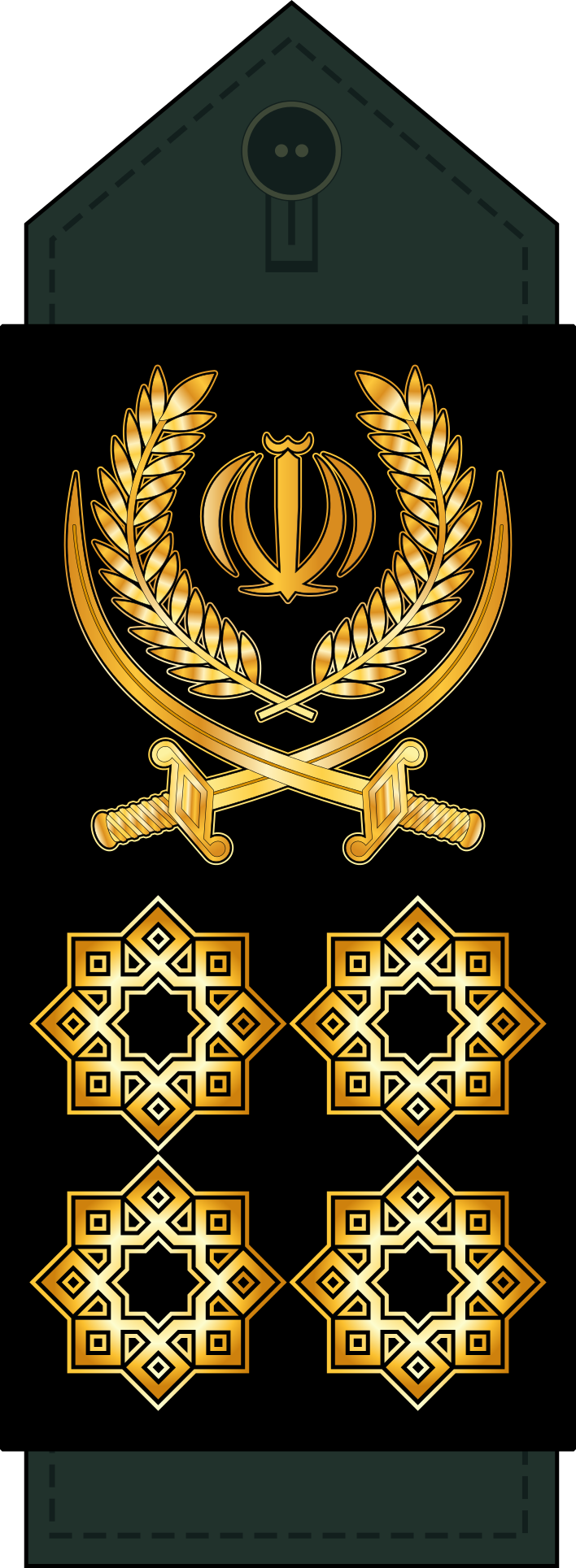
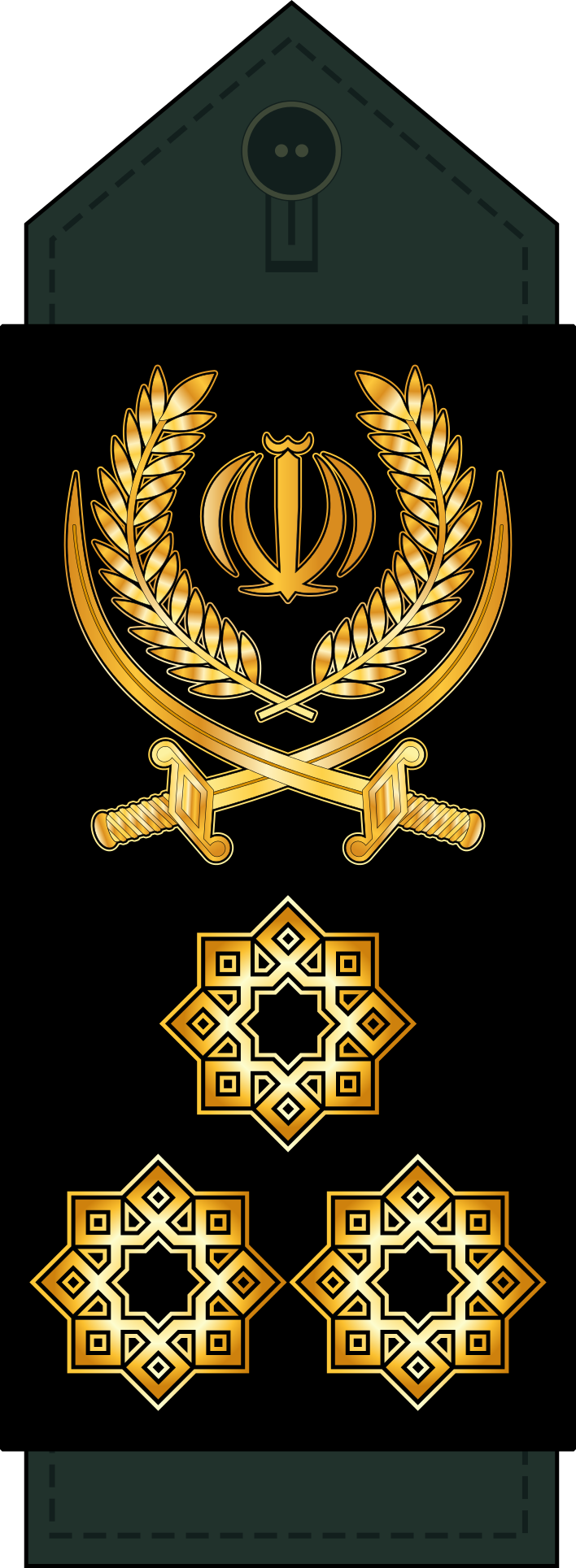
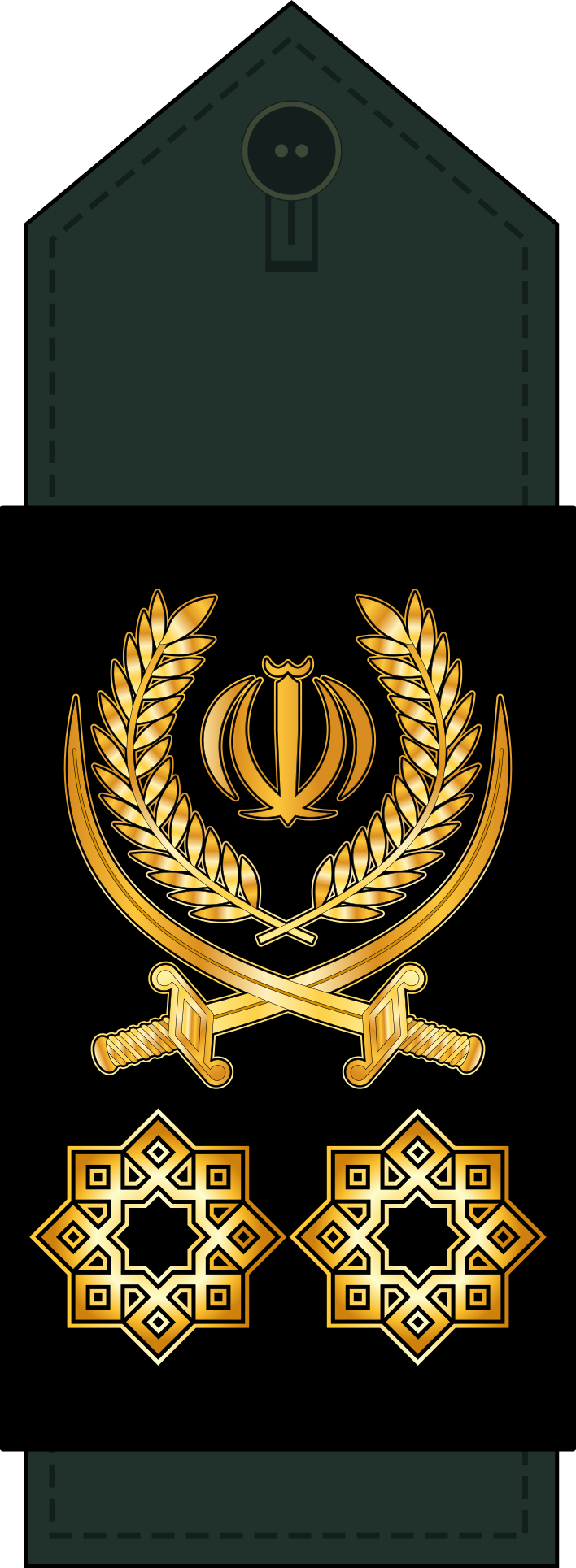
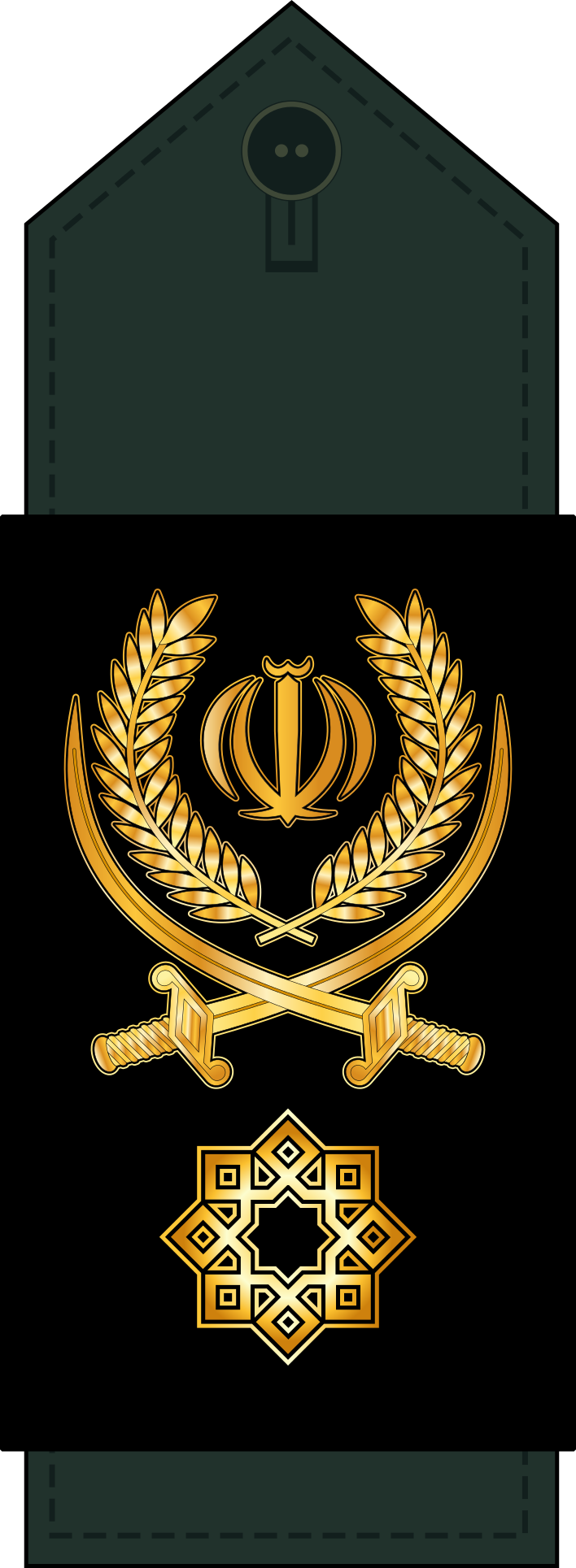
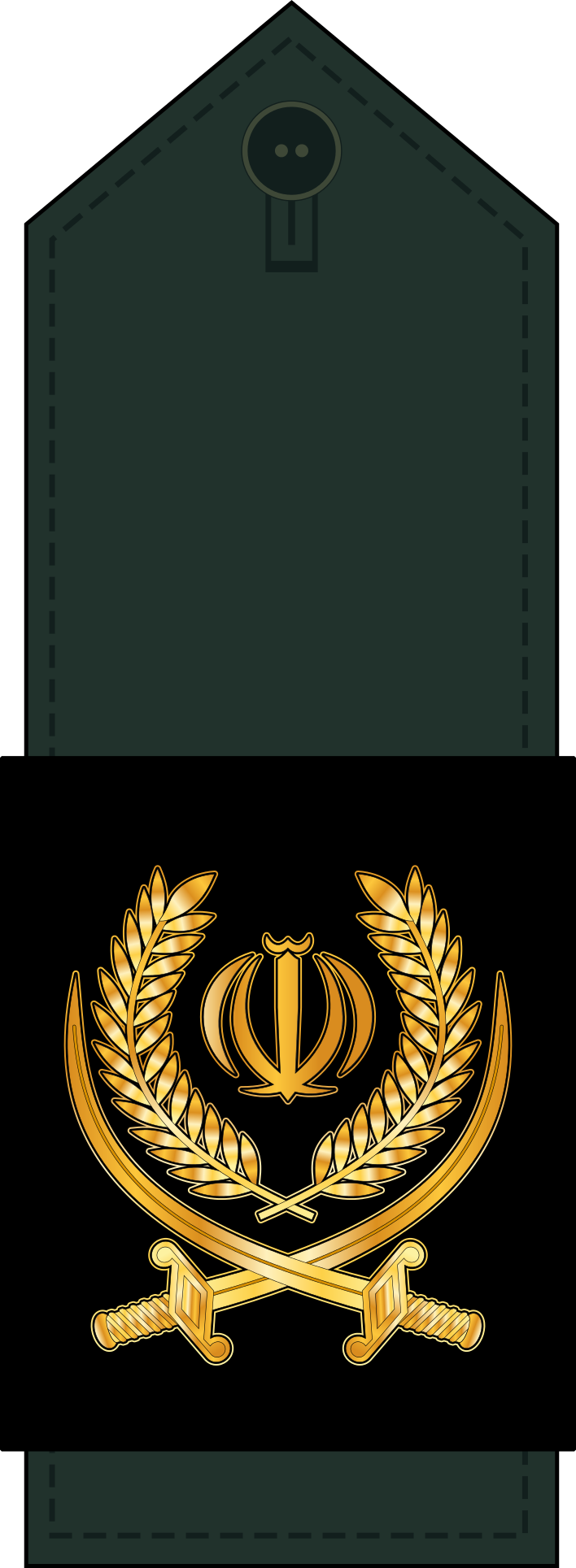
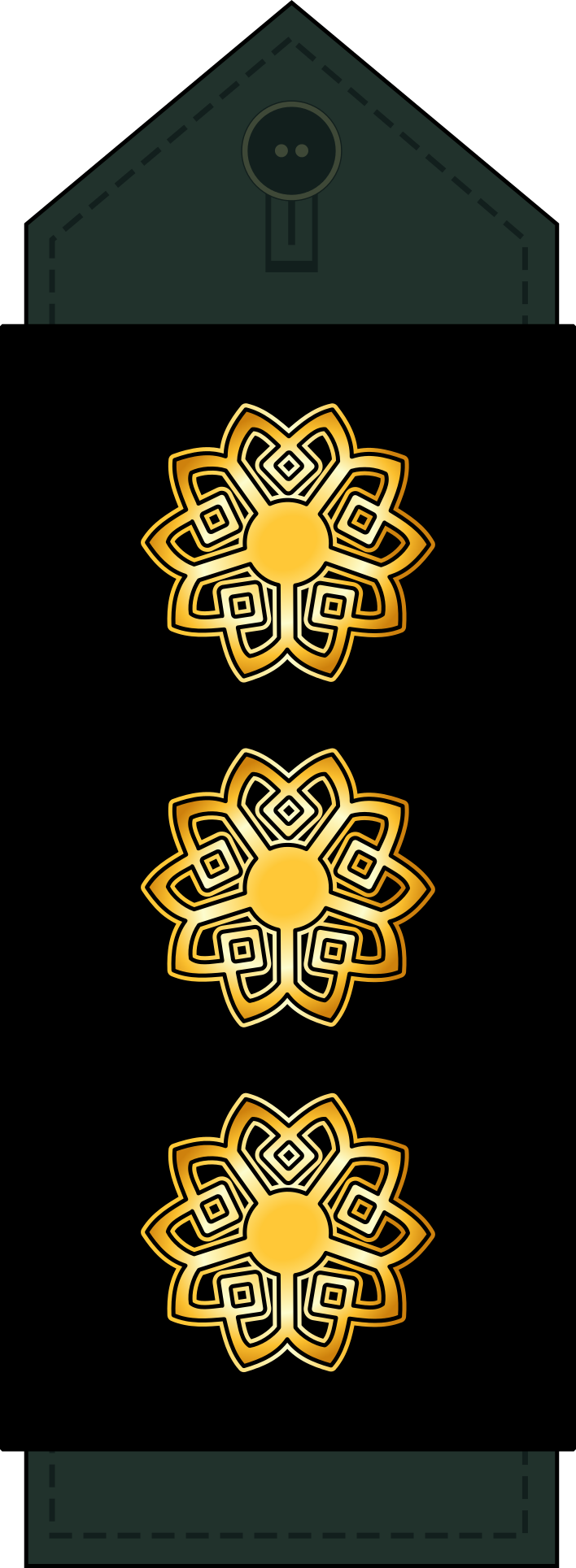
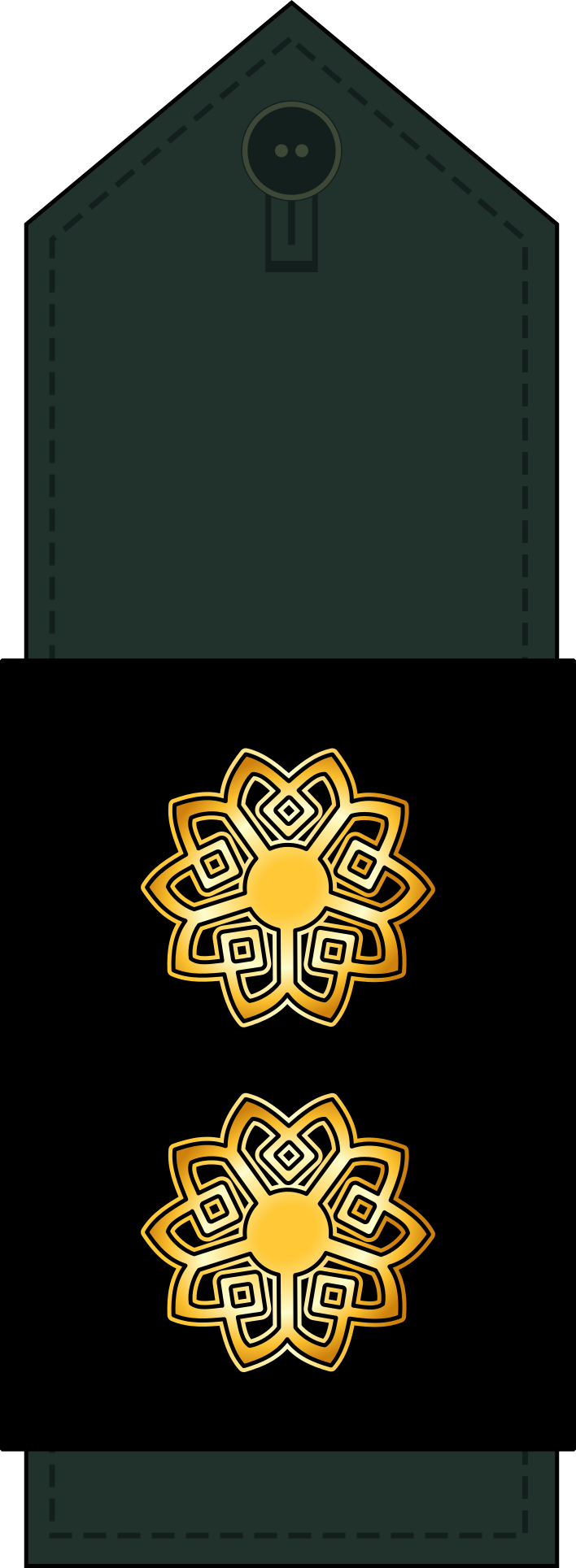
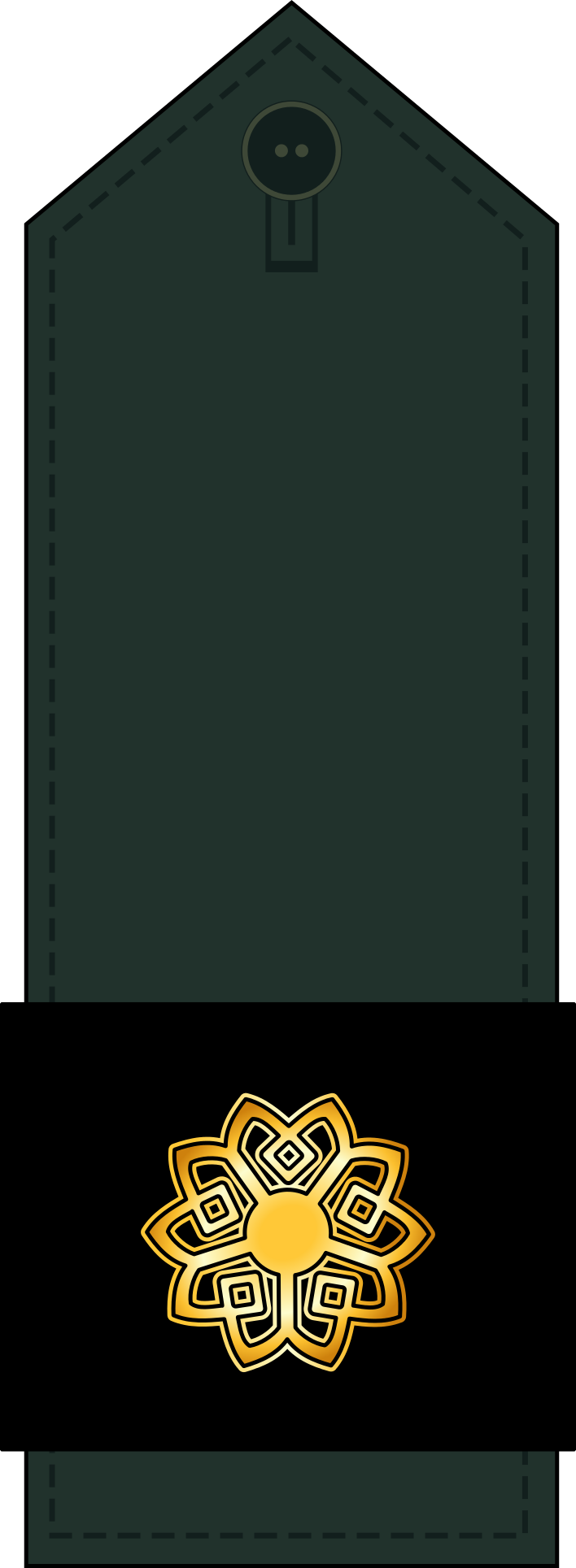
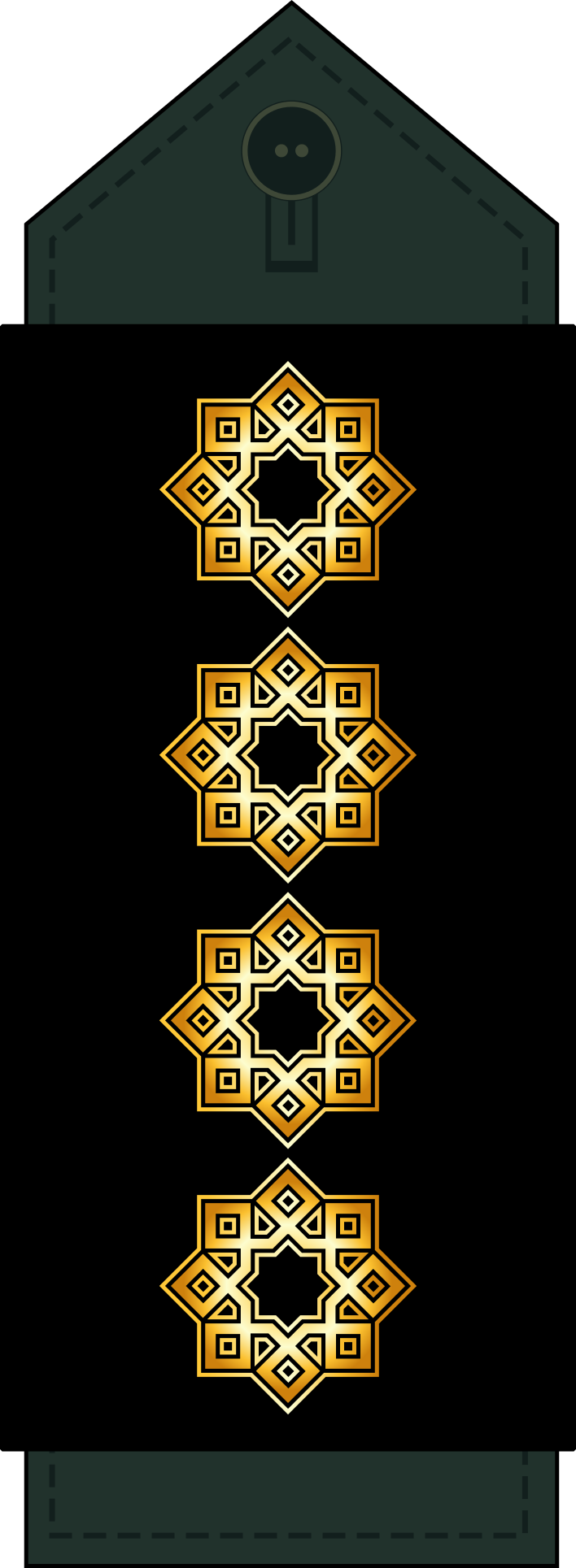
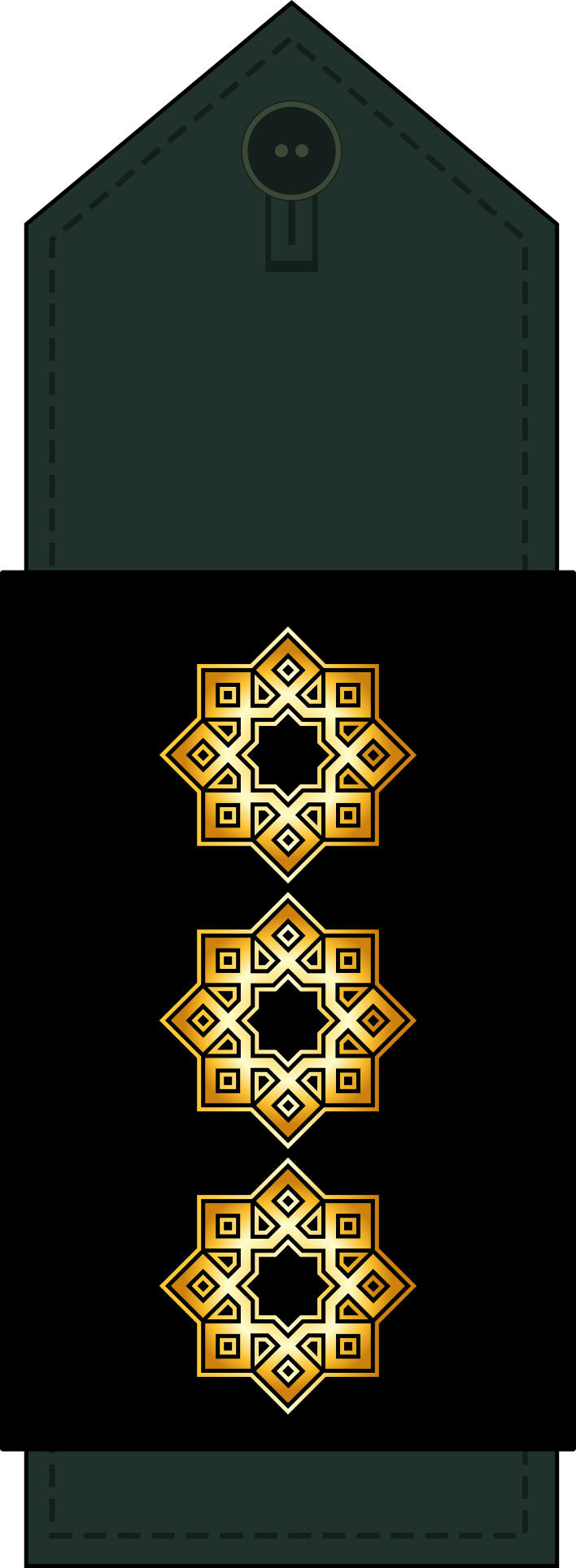
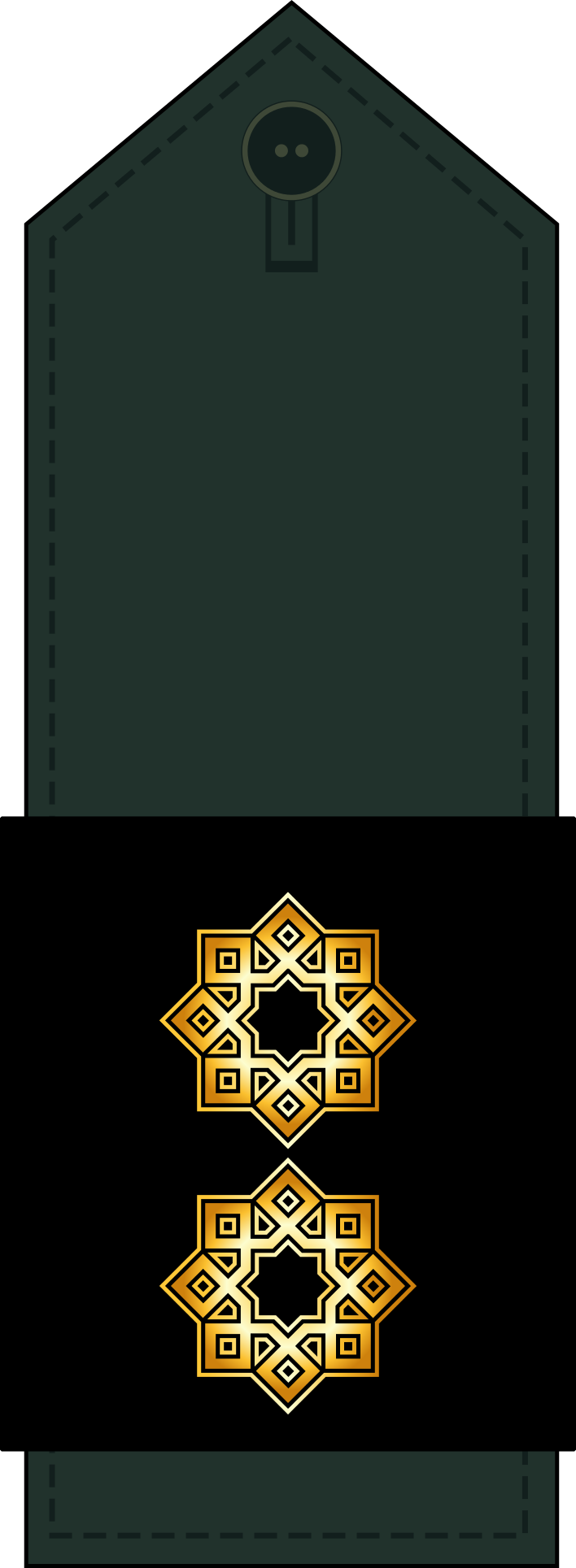
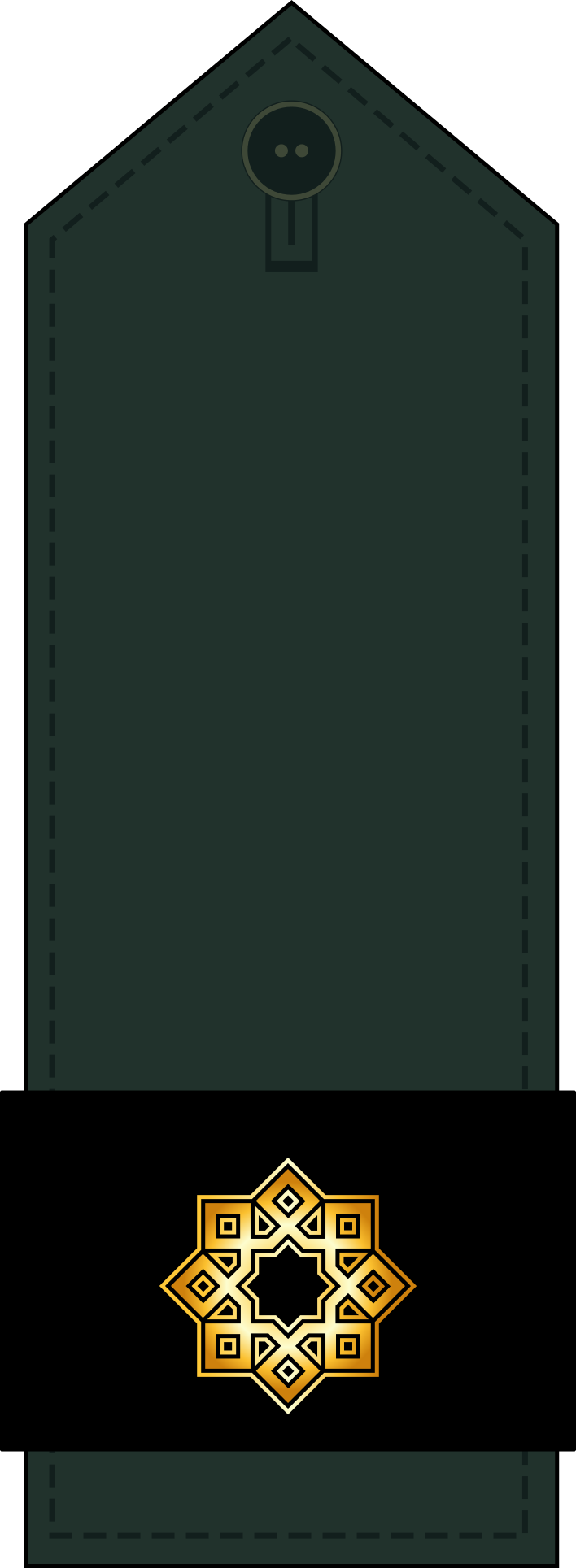
Rank group	General/Flag/Air officers						Senior officers				Junior officers
PLA Aerospace Force
PLA Aerospace Force		上将; Shàngjiàng	中将; Zhōngjiàng	少将; Shàojiàng			大校; Dàxiào	上校; Shàngxiào	中校; Zhōngxiào	少校; Shàoxiào	上尉; Shàngwèi	中尉; Zhōngwèi		少尉; Shàowèi
Colombian Aerospace Force
Colombian Aerospace Force		General del aire		Mayor general del aire	Brigadier general del aire		Coronel		Teniente coronel	Mayor	Capitán	Teniente		Subteniente
French Air and Space Force
French Air and Space Force		Général d´armée aérienne	Général de corps aérien	Général de division aérienne	Général de brigade aérienne		Colonel		Lieutenant-colonel	Commandant	Capitaine	Lieutenant		Sous-lieutenant
IRGC Aerospace Force
IRGC Aerospace Force		ارتشبد پاسدار; Arteshbod pasdar	سپهبد پاسدار; Sepahbod pasdar	سرلشکر پاسدار; Sarlashkar pasdar	سرتیپ پاسدار; Sartip pasdar	سرتیپ دوم پاسدار; Sartip dovom pasdar	سرهنگ پاسدار; Sarhang pasdar		سرهنگ دوم پاسدار; Sarhang dovom pasdar	سرگرد پاسدار; Sargord pasdar	سروان پاسدار; Sarwan pasdar	ستوان یکم پاسدار; Sotwan yekom pasdar	ستوان دوم پاسدار; Sotwan dovom pasdar	ستوان سوم پاسدار; Sotwan sevom pasdar
Royal Netherlands Air and Space Force
Royal Netherlands Air and Space Force		Generaal	Luitenant-generaal	Generaal-majoor	Commodore		Kolonel		Luitenant-kolonel	Majoor	Kapitein	Eerste luitenant		Tweede luitenant
Russian Aerospace Forces
Russian Aerospace Forces		Генера́л а́рмии Generál ármii	Генера́л-полко́вник; Generál-polkóvnik	Генера́л-лейтена́нт; Generál-leytenánt	Генера́л-майо́р; Generál-mayór		Полко́вник; Polkóvnik		Подполко́вник; Podpolkóvnik	Майо́р; Majór	Kапита́н; Kapitán	Старший лейтена́нт Stárshiy leytenánt	Лейтенант; Leytenant	Mла́дший лейтена́нт Mládshiy leytenánt
Spanish Air and Space Force
Spanish Air and Space Force	Capitán general	General del Aire	Teniente general	General de división	General de brigada		Coronel		Teniente coronel	Comandante	Capitán	Teniente		Alférez
United States Space Force
United States Space Force		General	Lieutenant general	Major general	Brigadier general		Colonel		Lieutenant colonel	Major	Captain	First lieutenant		Second lieutenant
Rank group	General/Flag/Air officers						Senior officers				Junior officers

=== Enlisted ===
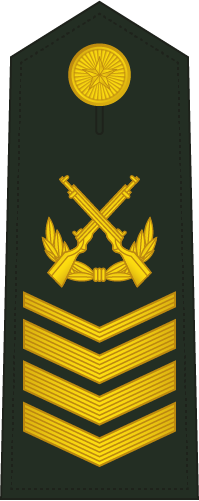
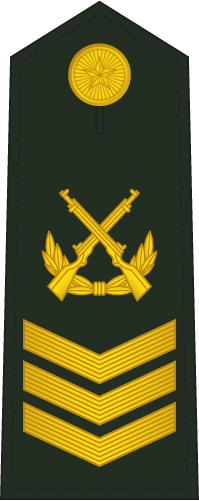
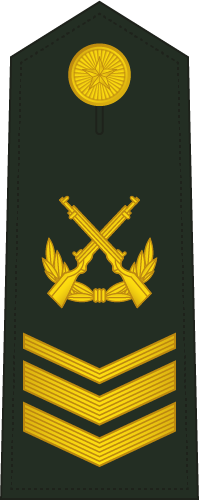
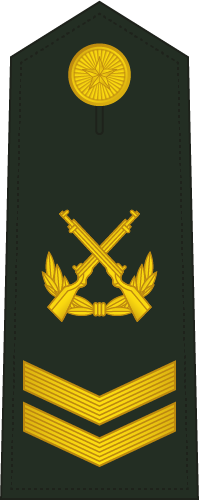
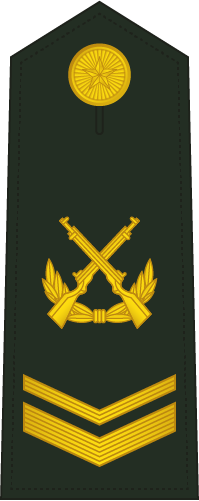
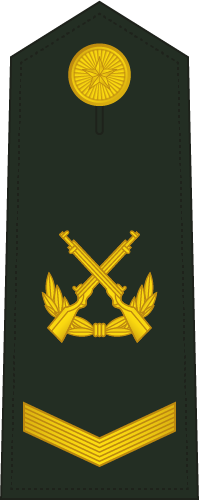
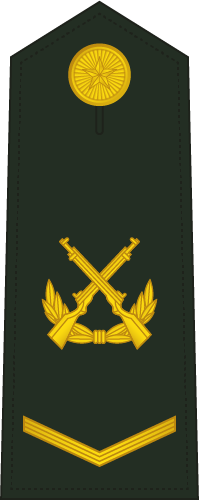
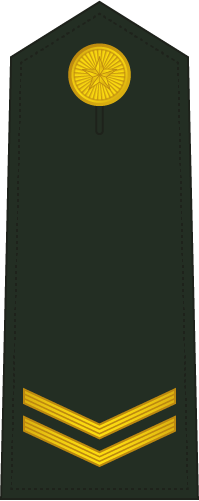
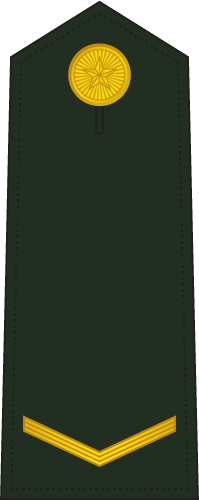
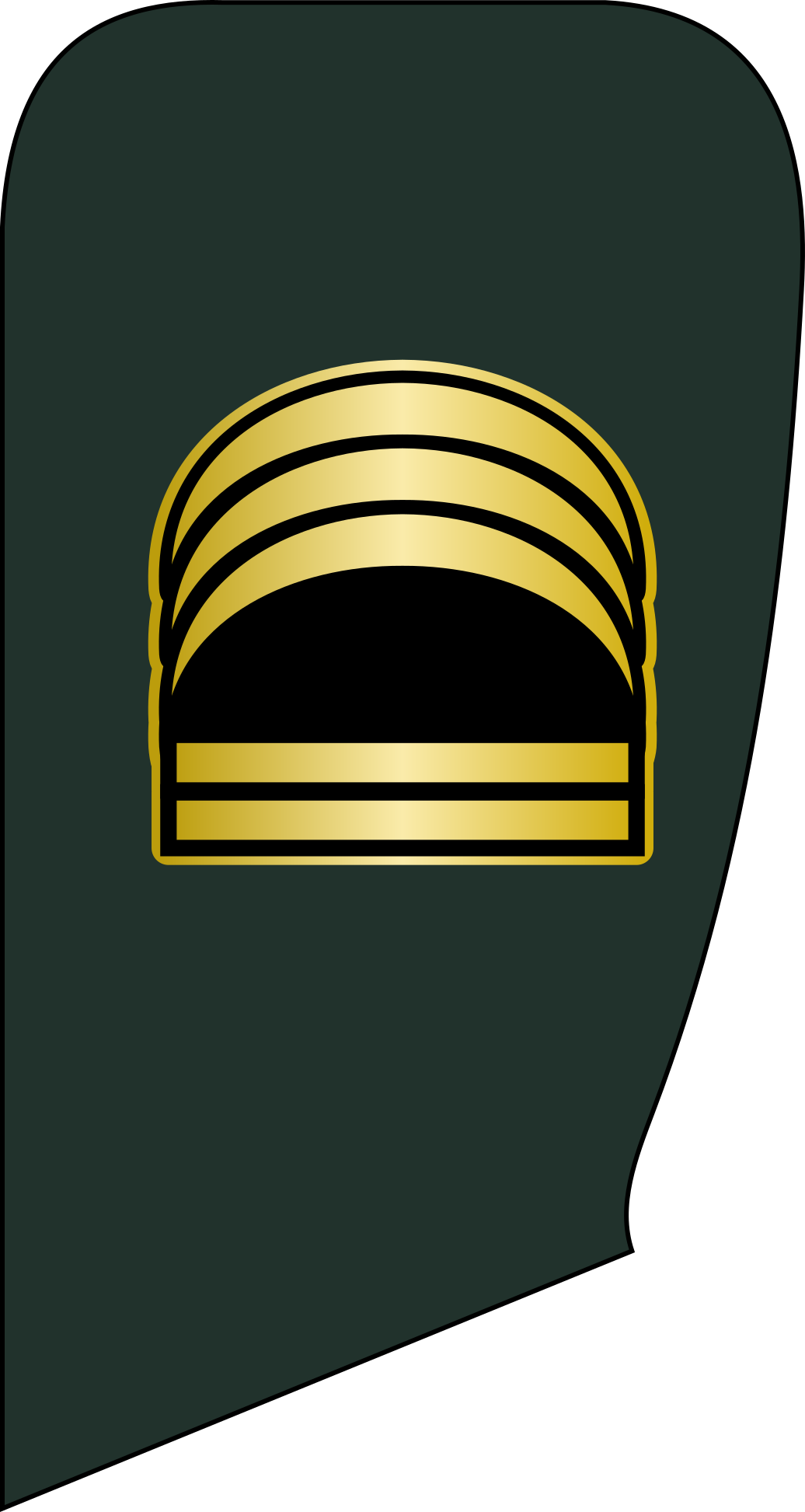
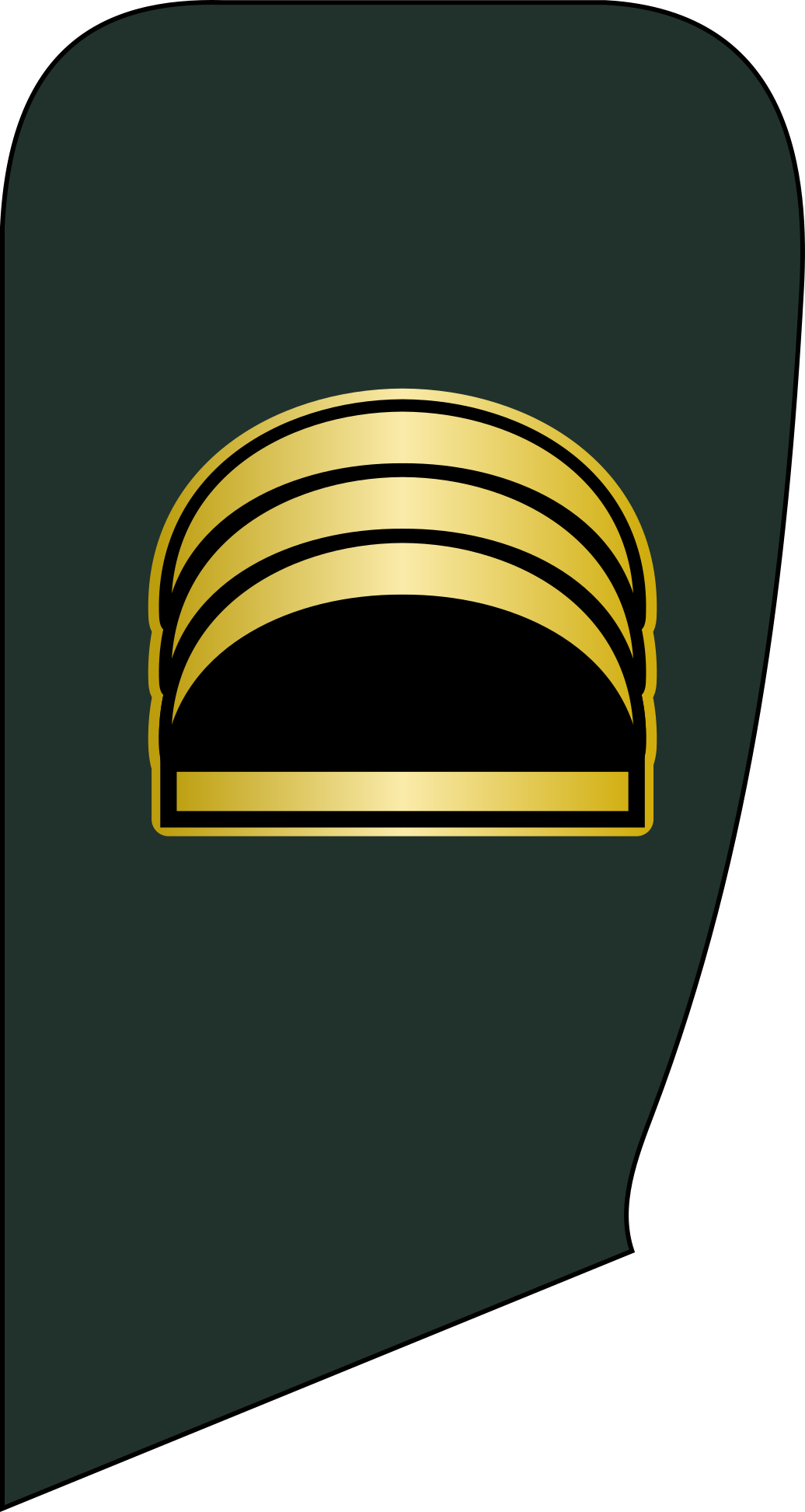
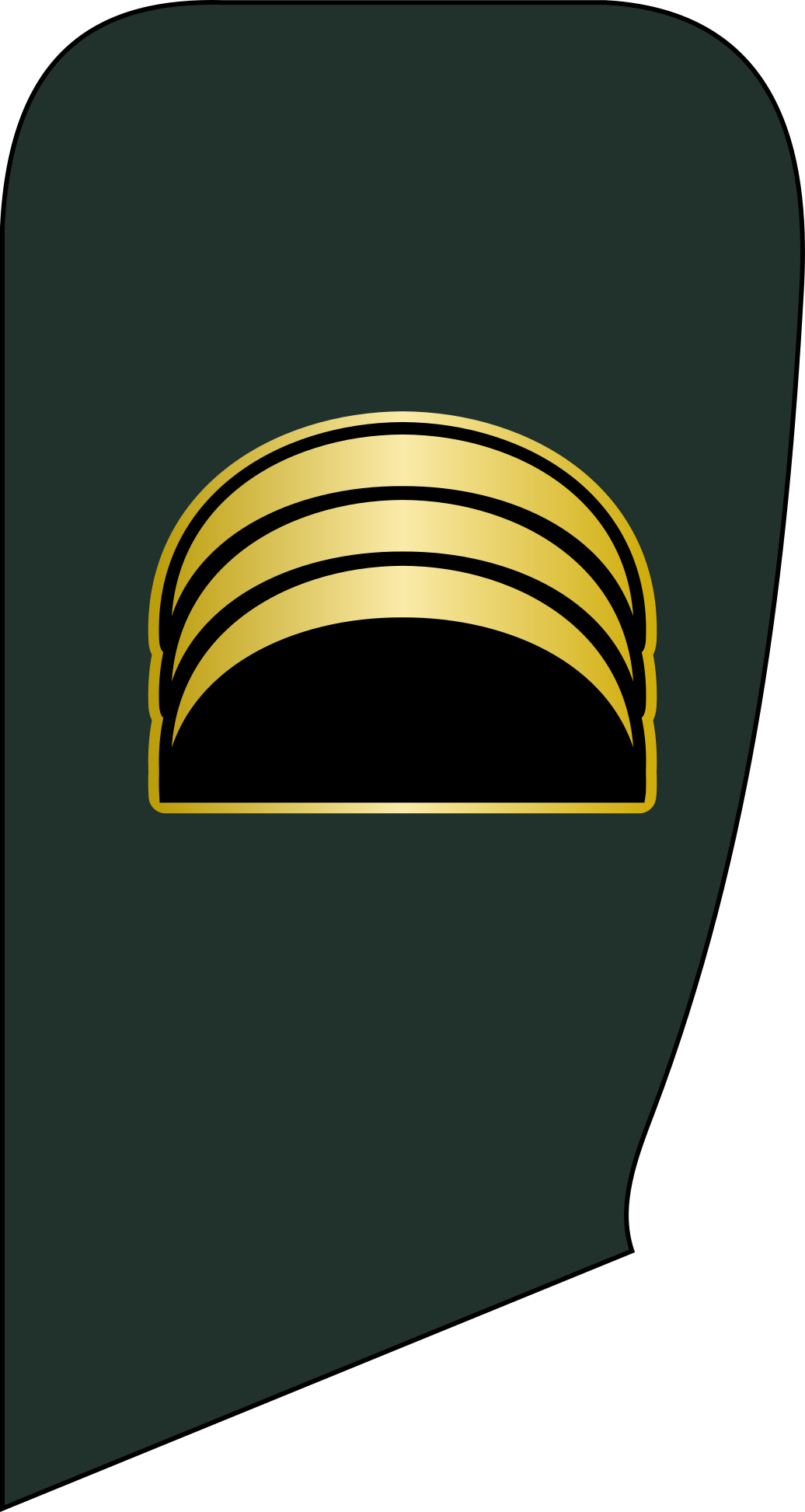
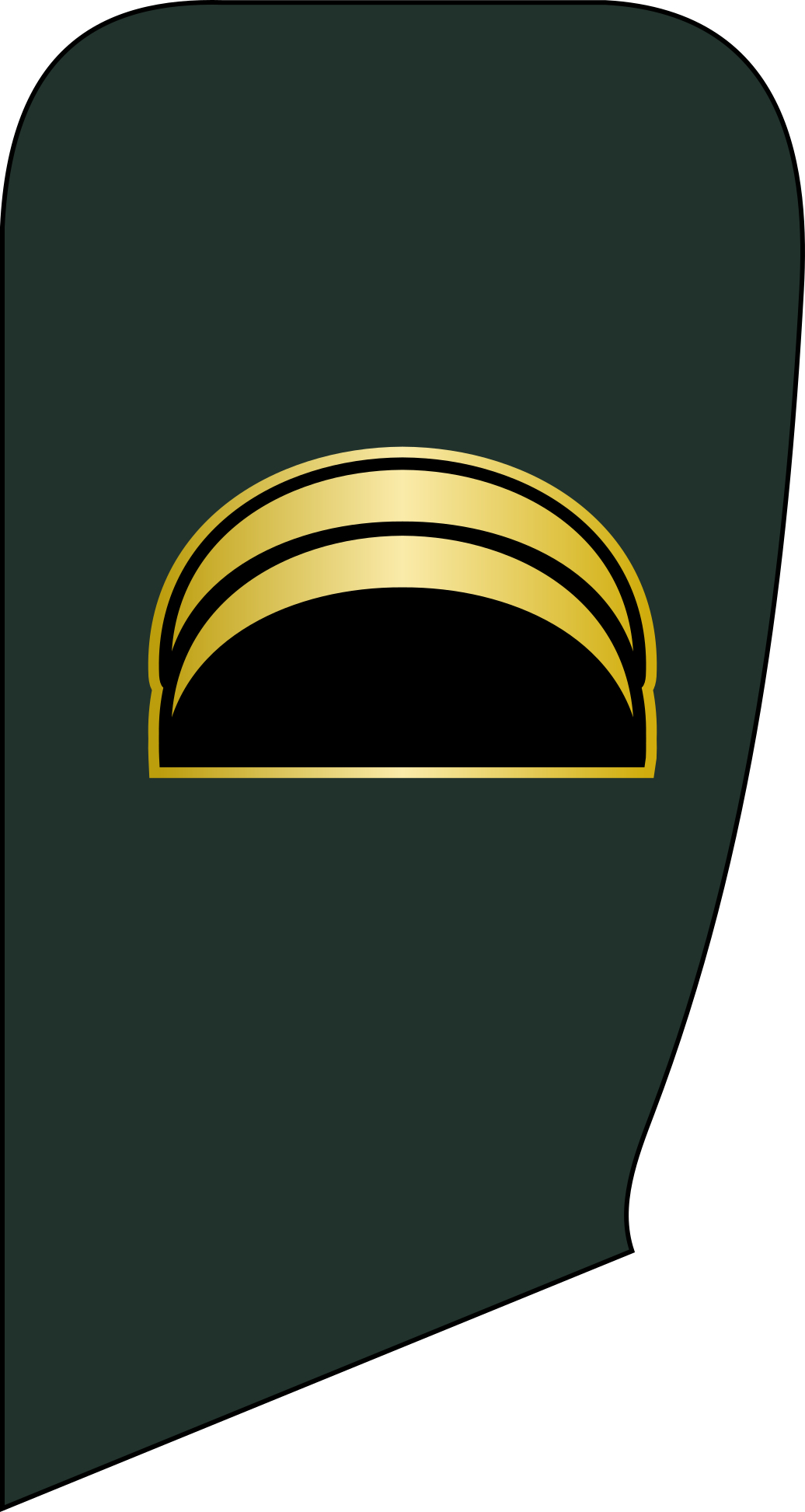
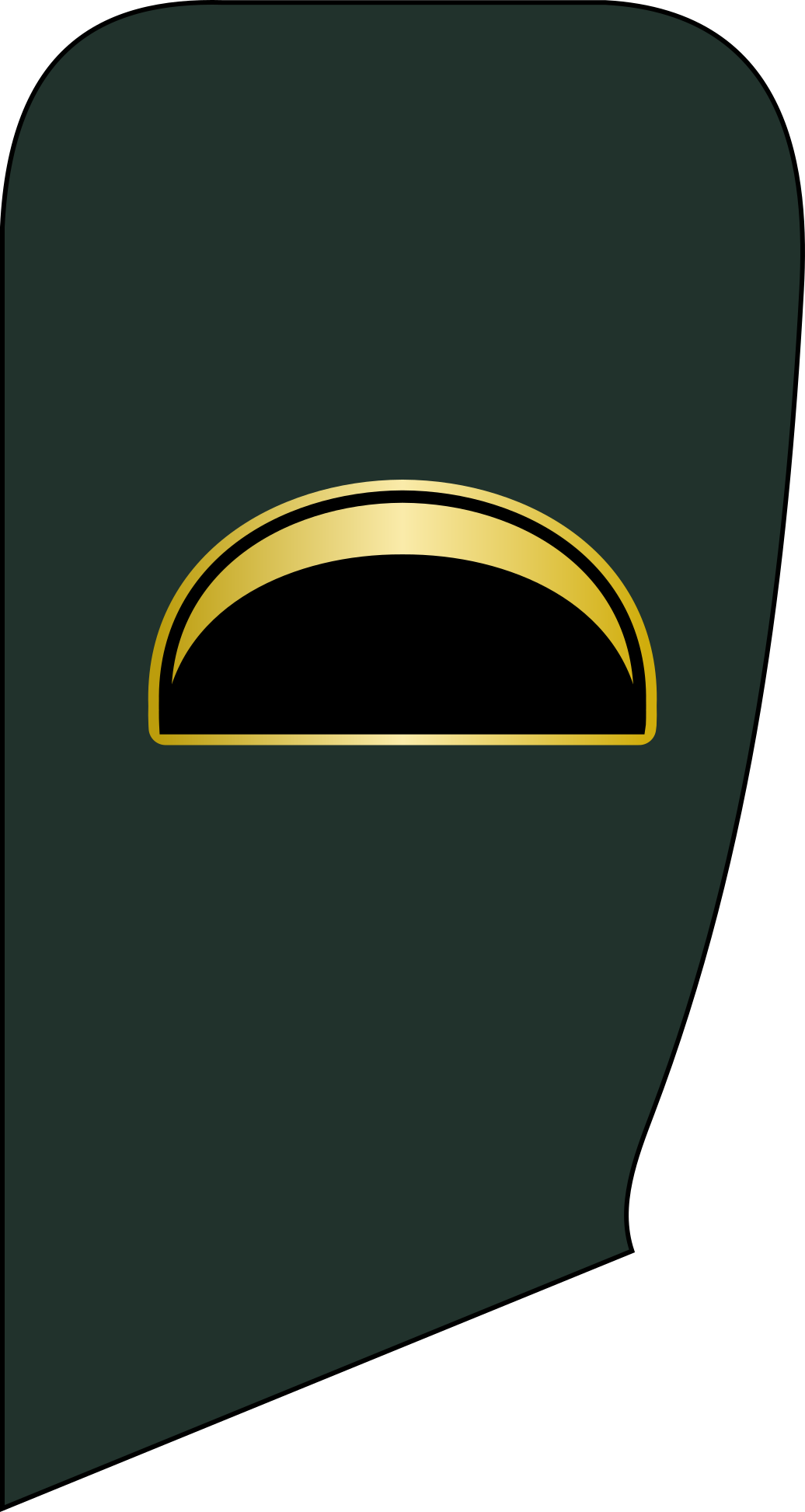
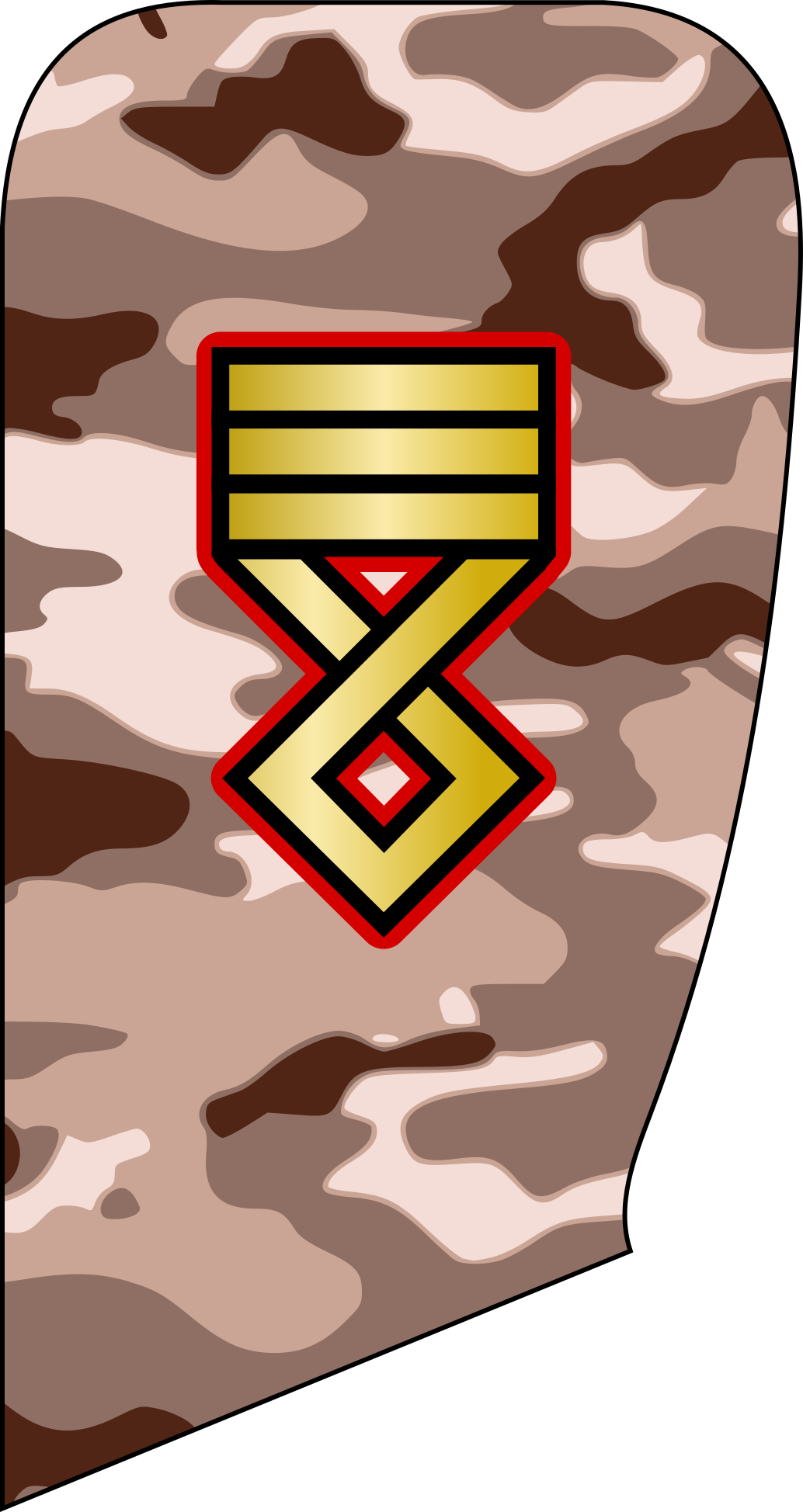
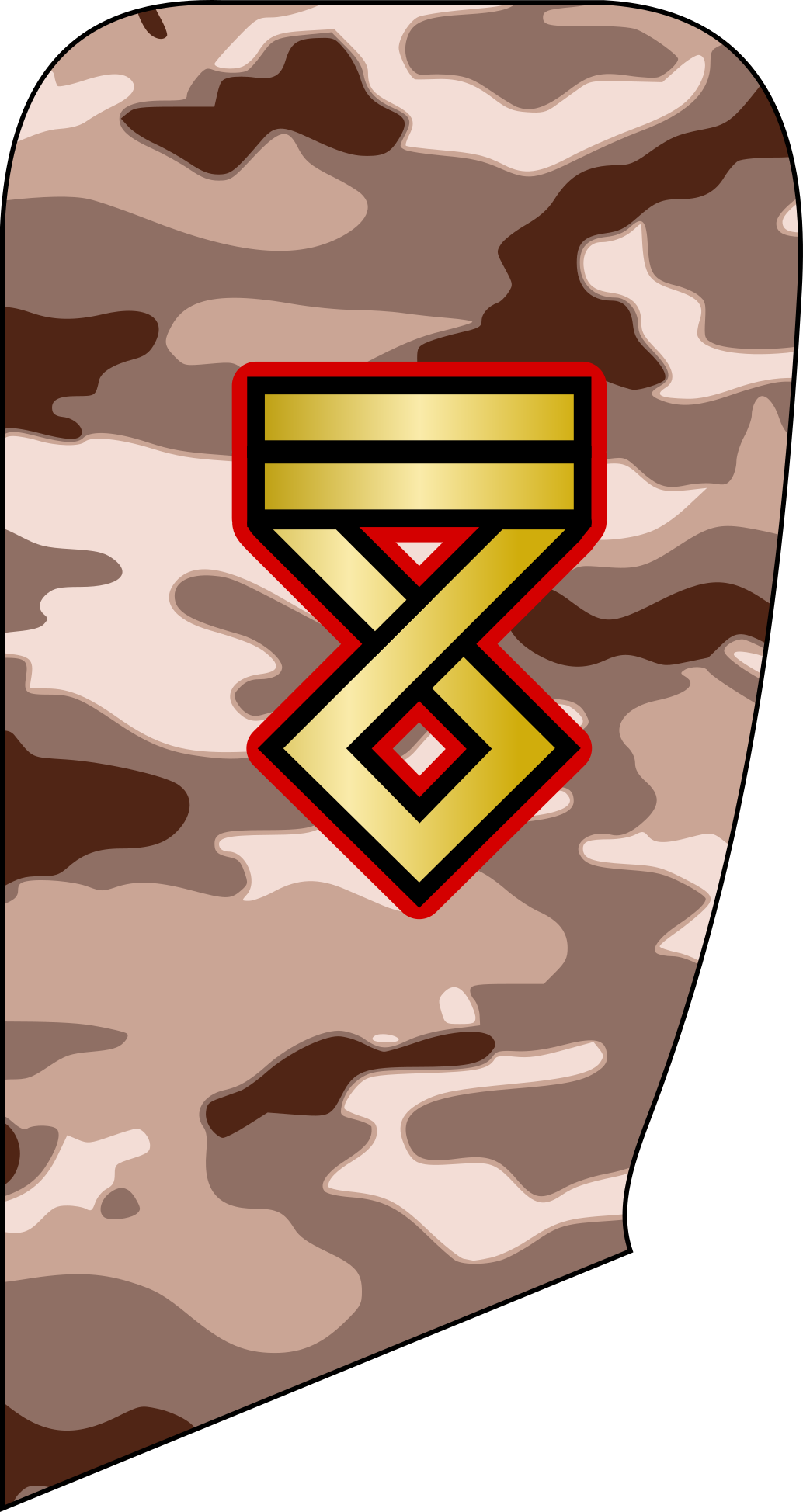
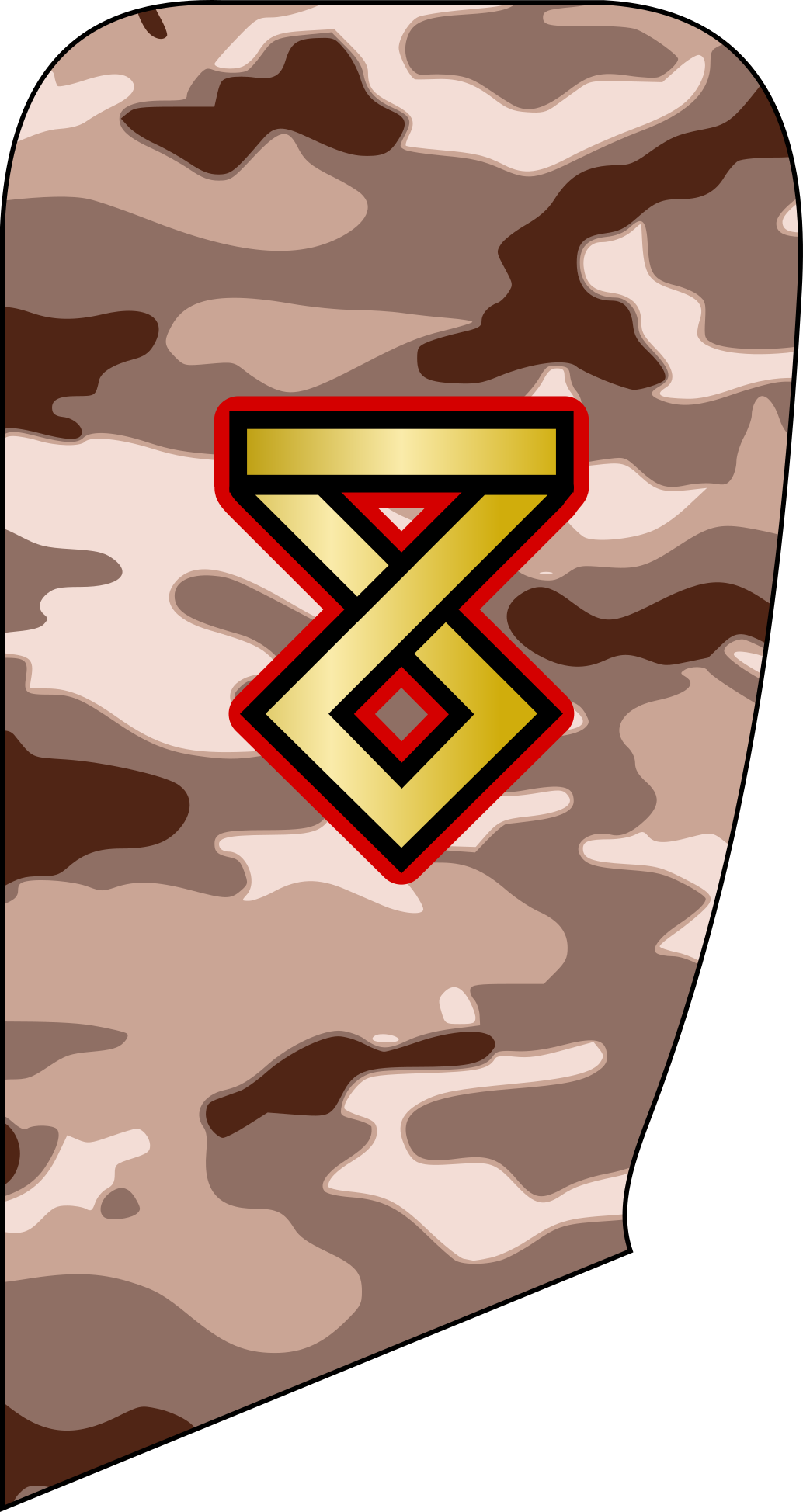
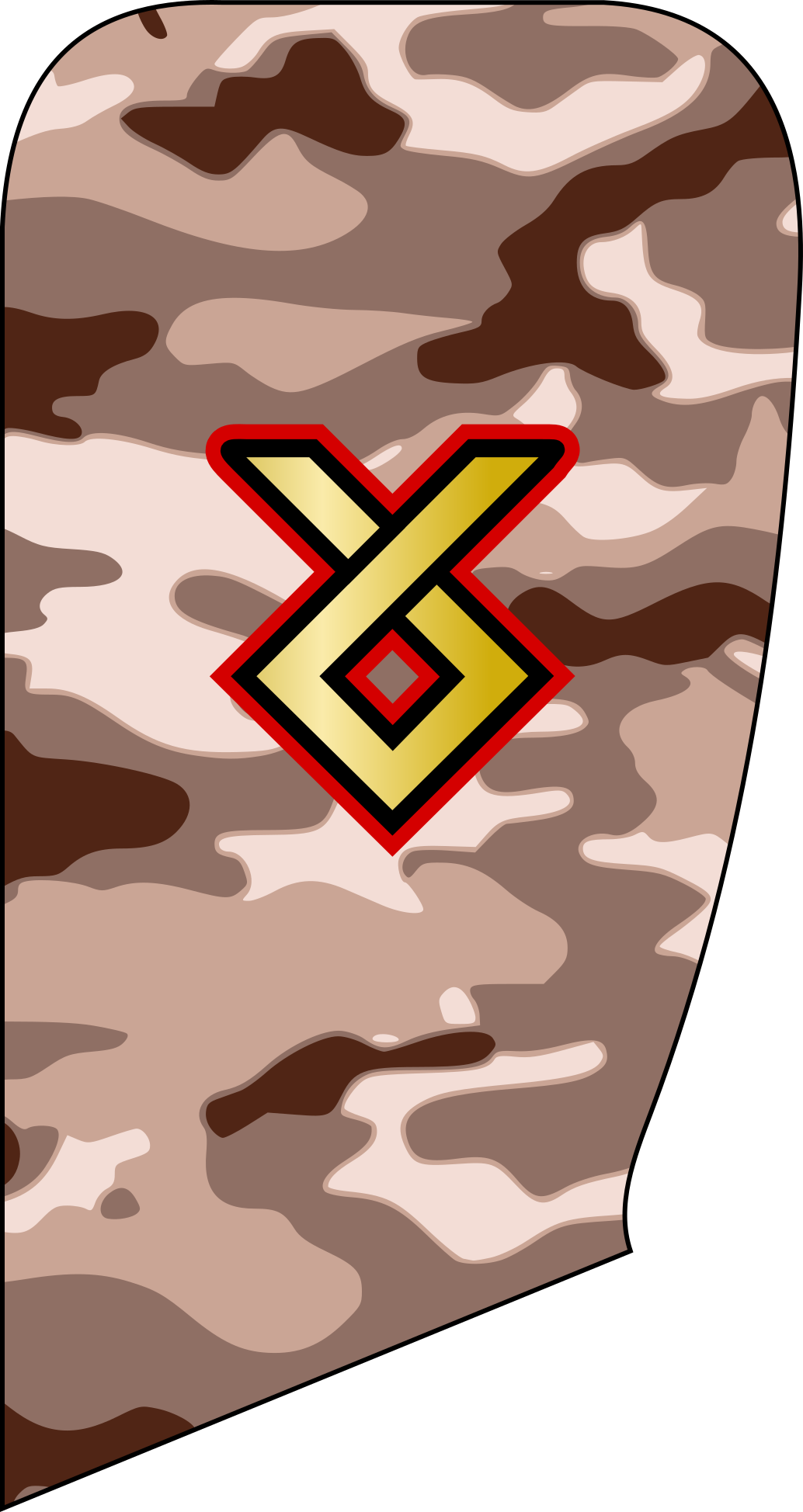
Rank group	Senior NCOs						Junior NCOs		Enlisted
PLA Aerospace Force
PLA Aerospace Force	一级军士长; Yījí jūnshìzhǎng	二级军士长; Èrjí jūnshìzhǎng	三级军士长; Sānjí jūnshìzhǎng	四级军士长; Sìjí jūnshìzhǎng	上士; Shàngshì	中士; Zhōngshì	下士; Xiàshì		上等兵; Shàngděngbīng		列兵; Lièbīng
Colombian Aerospace Force
Colombian Aerospace Force	Técnico jefe de comando conjunto	Técnico jefe de comando	Técnico jefe	Técnico subjefe	Técnico primero	Técnico segundo	Técnico tercero	Técnico cuarto	Aerotécnico
(France) French Air and Space Force
(France) French Air and Space Force	Major	Adjudant-chef	Adjudant		Sergent-chef	Sergent	Caporal-chef	Caporal	Aviateur 1^{e} classe		Aviateur 2^{e} classe
IRGC Aerospace Force
IRGC Aerospace Force	رزم‌دار یکم; Razmdar yekom pasdar		رزم‌دار دوم; Razmdar dovom pasdar	رزم‌آور یکم; Razmavar yekom pasdar	رزم‌آور دوم; Razmavar dovom pasdar	رزم‌آور سوم; Razmavar sevom pasdar	رزم‌یار; Razmyar pasdar	سرباز یکم; Sarbaz yekom pasdar	سرباز دوم; Sarbaz dovom pasdar		سرباز; Sarbaz pasdar
Royal Netherlands Air and Space Force
Royal Netherlands Air and Space Force	Adjudant-onderofficier			Sergeant-majoor	Sergeant der 1e klasse	Sergeant	Korporaal der 1e klasse	Korporaal	Soldaat der 1ste klasse	Soldaat der 2de klasse	Soldaat der 3de klasse
Russian Aerospace Forces
Russian Aerospace Forces	Ста́рший пра́порщик Stárshiy práporshchik	Пра́порщик; Práporshchyk	Старшина́ Starshyná	Ста́рший сержа́нт Stárshiy serzhánt	Сержа́нт; Serzhánt	Мла́дший сержа́нт Mládshiy serzhánt	Ефре́йтор; Efréĭtor	Рядово́й; Ryadovóy
Spanish Air and Space Force
Spanish Air and Space Force	Suboficial mayor	Subteniente	Brigada	Sargento primero	Sargento	Cabo mayor	Cabo primero	Cabo	Soldado de primera		Soldado
United States Space Force
United States Space Force	Chief master sergeant		Senior master sergeant	Master sergeant	Technical sergeant	Sergeant	Specialist 4	Specialist 3	Specialist 2		Specialist 1
Rank group	Senior NCOs						Junior NCOs		Enlisted

=== Former ranks ===
==== Officers ====
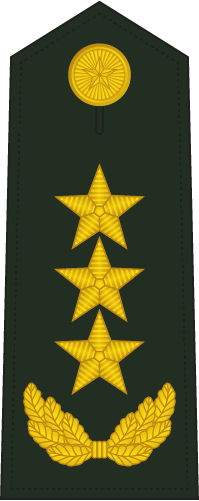
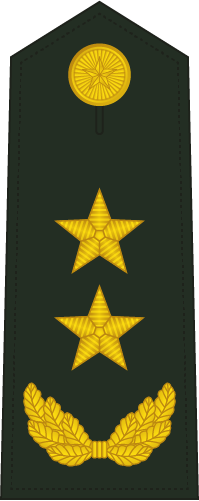
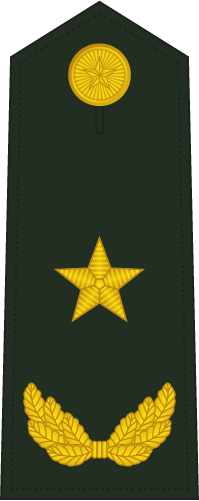
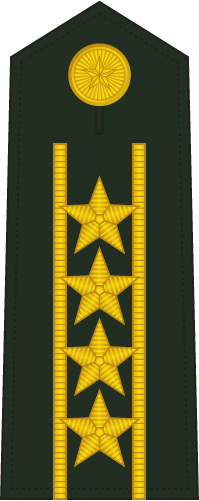
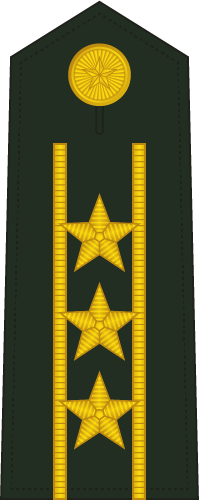
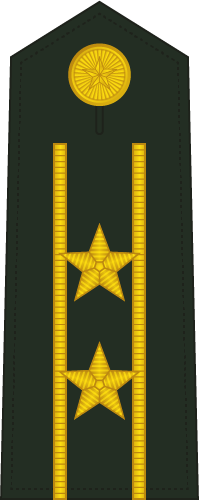
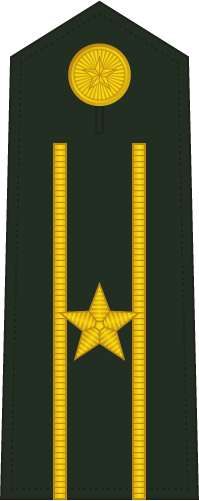
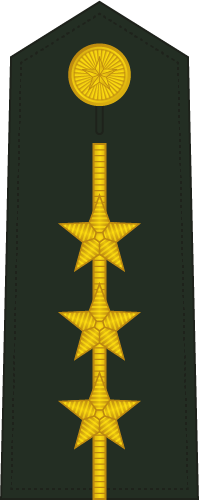
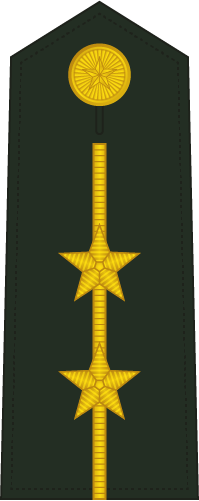
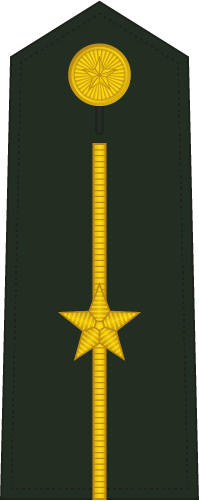
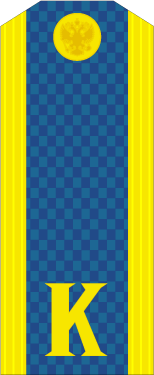
Rank group	General/Flag/Air officers					Senior officers				Junior officers
(China) PLA Strategic Support Force
(China) PLA Strategic Support Force	上将; Shàngjiàng		中将; Zhōngjiàng	少将; Shàojiàng		大校; Dàxiào	上校; Shàngxiào	中校; Zhōngxiào	少校; Shàoxiào	上尉; Shàngwèi	中尉; Zhōngwèi		少尉; Shàowèi
Russian Aerospace Defence Forces (2011–2015)	(2013–2015)	(2011–2013)
Russian Aerospace Defence Forces (2011–2015)	Генера́л а́рмии Generál ármii		Генера́л-полко́вник; Generál-polkóvnik	Генера́л-лейтена́нт; Generál-leytenánt	Генера́л-майо́р; Generál-mayór	Полко́вник; Polkóvnik		Подполко́вник; Podpolkóvnik	Майо́р; Majór	Kапита́н; Kapitán	Старший лейтена́нт Stárshiy leytenánt	Лейтенант; Leytenant	Mла́дший лейтена́нт Mládshiy leytenánt	Курсант; Kursant
Russian Space Forces (2010–2011)
Russian Space Forces (2010–2011)	Генера́л а́рмии Generál ármii		Генера́л-полко́вник; Generál-polkóvnik	Генера́л-лейтена́нт; Generál-leytenánt	Генера́л-майо́р; Generál-mayór	Полко́вник; Polkóvnik		Подполко́вник; Podpolkóvnik	Майо́р; Majór	Kапита́н; Kapitán	Старший лейтена́нт Stárshiy leytenánt	Лейтенант; Leytenant	Mла́дший лейтена́нт Mládshiy leytenánt	Курсант; Kursant
Russian Space Forces (1994–1997 / 2001–2011)	(1997–2010)	(1994–1997)
Russian Space Forces (1994–1997 / 2001–2011)	Генера́л а́рмии Generál ármii		Генера́л-полко́вник; Generál-polkóvnik	Генера́л-лейтена́нт; Generál-leytenánt	Генера́л-майо́р; Generál-mayór	Полко́вник; Polkóvnik		Подполко́вник; Podpolkóvnik	Майо́р; Majór	Kапита́н; Kapitán	Старший лейтена́нт Stárshiy leytenánt	Лейтенант; Leytenant	Mла́дший лейтена́нт Mládshiy leytenánt	Курсант; Kursant
Rank group	General/Flag/Air officers					Senior officers				Junior officers

==== Enlisted ====
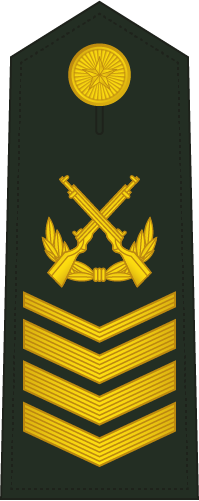
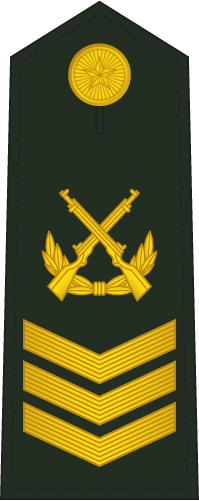
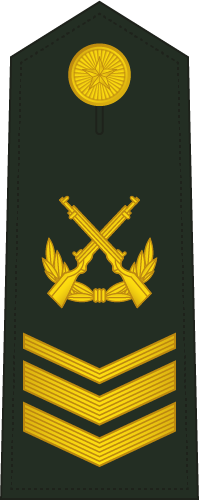
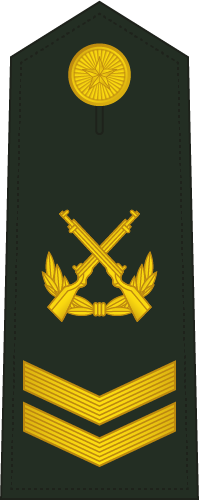
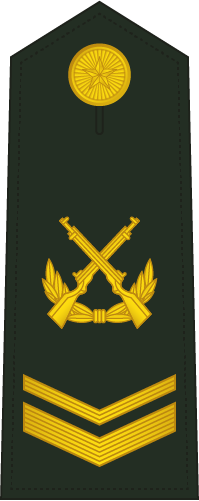
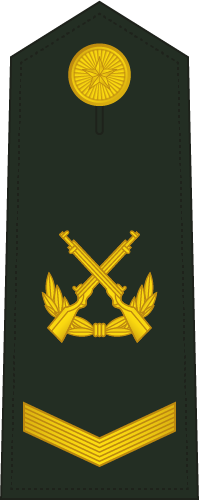
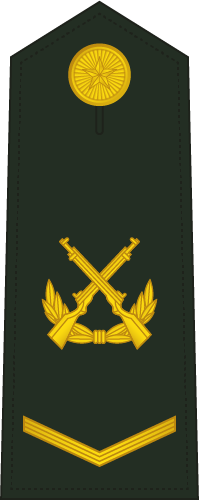
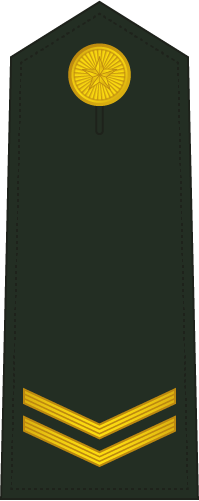
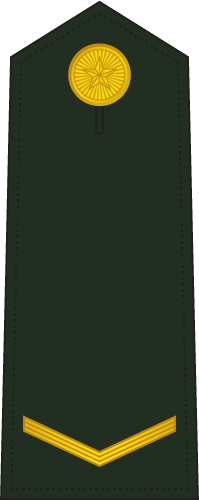
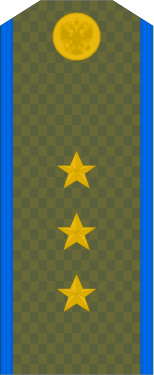
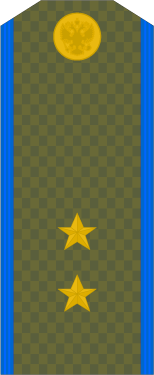
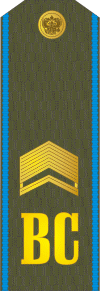
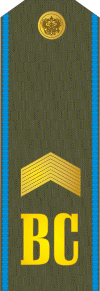
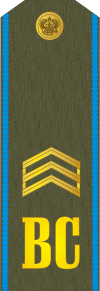
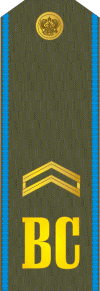
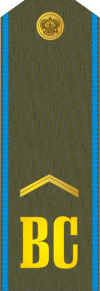
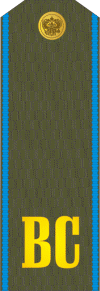
Rank group	Senior NCOs							Junior NCOs		Enlisted
PLA Strategic Support Force
PLA Strategic Support Force	一级军士长; Yījí jūnshìzhǎng		二级军士长; Èrjí jūnshìzhǎng	三级军士长; Sānjí jūnshìzhǎng	四级军士长; Sìjí jūnshìzhǎng	上士; Shàngshì	中士; Zhōngshì	下士; Xiàshì		上等兵; Shàngděngbīng	列兵; Lièbīng
Russian Aerospace Defence Forces (2011–2015)
Russian Aerospace Defence Forces (2011–2015)	Ста́рший пра́порщик Stárshiy práporshchik		Пра́порщик; Práporshchyk	Старшина́ Starshyná	Ста́рший сержа́нт Stárshiy serzhánt	Сержа́нт; Serzhánt	Мла́дший сержа́нт Mládshiy serzhánt	Ефре́йтор; Efréĭtor	Рядово́й; Ryadovóy
Russian Space Forces (2010–2011)
Russian Space Forces (2010–2011)	Ста́рший пра́порщик Stárshiy práporshchik		Пра́порщик; Práporshchyk	Старшина́ Starshyná	Ста́рший сержа́нт Stárshiy serzhánt	Сержа́нт; Serzhánt	Мла́дший сержа́нт Mládshiy serzhánt	Ефре́йтор; Efréĭtor	Рядово́й; Ryadovóy
Russian Space Forces (1994–1997 / 2001–2010)
Russian Space Forces (1994–1997 / 2001–2010)	Ста́рший пра́порщик Stárshiy práporshchik		Пра́порщик; Práporshchyk	Старшина́ Starshyná	Ста́рший сержа́нт Stárshiy serzhánt	Сержа́нт; Serzhánt	Мла́дший сержа́нт Mládshiy serzhánt	Ефре́йтор; Efréĭtor	Рядово́й; Ryadovóy
United States Space Force (2020–2021)											No insignia
United States Space Force (2020–2021)	Senior enlisted advisor to the chairman	Chief master sergeant of the Space Force	Chief master sergeant	Senior master sergeant	Master sergeant	Technical sergeant	Sergeant	Specialist 4	Specialist 3	Specialist 2	Specialist 1
Rank group	Senior NCOs							Junior NCOs		Enlisted

== Insignia ==
=== Flags ===
Flag of the People's Liberation Army Aerospace Force

Flag of the Colombian Aerospace Force

Ensign of the Colombian Aerospace Force

Flag of the Islamic Revolutionary Guard Corps Aerospace Force

Flag of the Royal Netherlands Air and Space Force

Governmental flag of the Royal Netherlands Air and Space Force

Flag of the Russian Aerospace Forces

Flag of the Russian Space Forces (independent troops from 1992–1997 & 2001–2011; currently sub-branch of the Russian Aerospace Forces)

Flag of the United States Space Force

=== Emblems ===
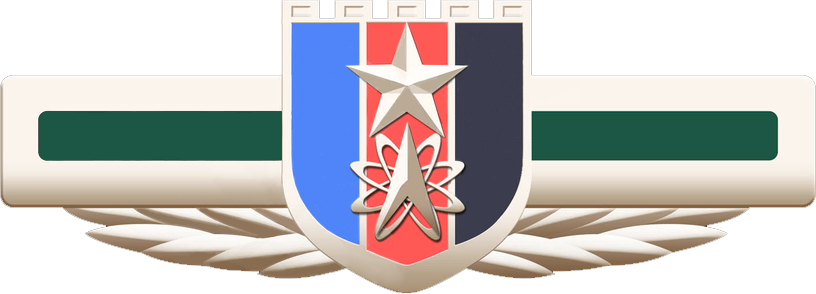
Badge of the People's Liberation Army Strategic Support Force (2015–2024)

Emblem of the People's Liberation Army Strategic Support Force (2015–2024)

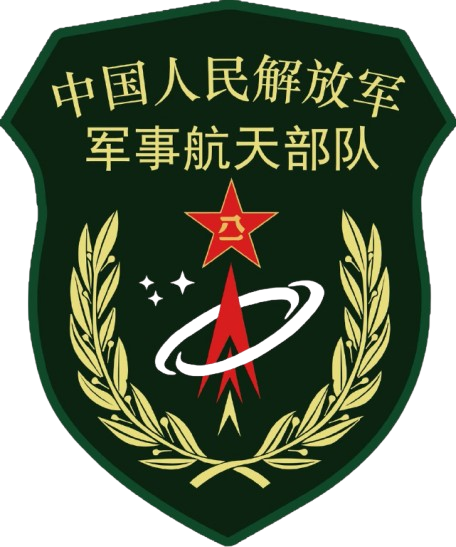
Badge of the People's Liberation Army Aerospace Force

Badge of the Colombian Aerospace Force

Emblem of the French Air and Space Force

Emblem of the Royal Netherlands Air and Space Force

Great emblem of the Russian Aerospace Forces

Medium emblem of the Russian Aerospace Forces

Small emblem of the Russian Aerospace Forces

Great emblem of the Russian Space Forces

Medium emblem of the Russian Space Forces

Small emblem of the Russian Space Forces

Emblem of the Spanish Air and Space Force

Seal of the United States Space Force

U.S. Space Force Delta.

== See also ==
- List of space forces
- Ranks and insignia of NATO
- Ranks and insignia of marine forces
