= Eagle, Globe, and Anchor =

US Marine Corps emblem and insignia

Eagle, Globe, and Anchor

The Eagle, Globe, and Anchor (commonly referred to as an EGA) is the official emblem and insignia of the United States Marine Corps. The current emblem traces its roots in the designs and ornaments of the early Continental Marines as well as the United Kingdom's Royal Marines. The present emblem, adopted in 1955, differs from the emblem of 1868 only by a change in the eagle. Before that time, many devices, ornaments, ribbons, and distinguishing marks followed one another as official badges of the corps.

== History ==
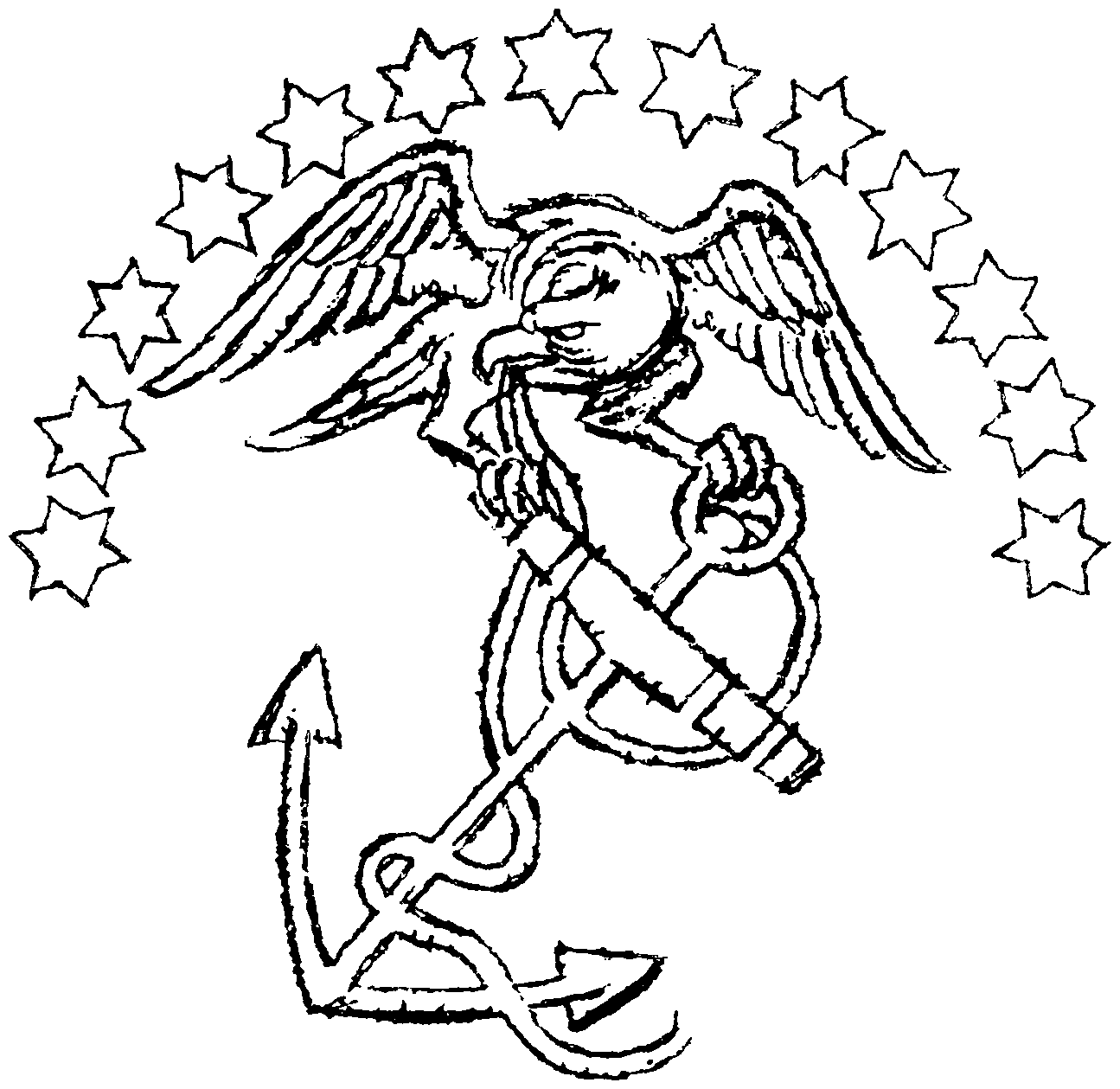
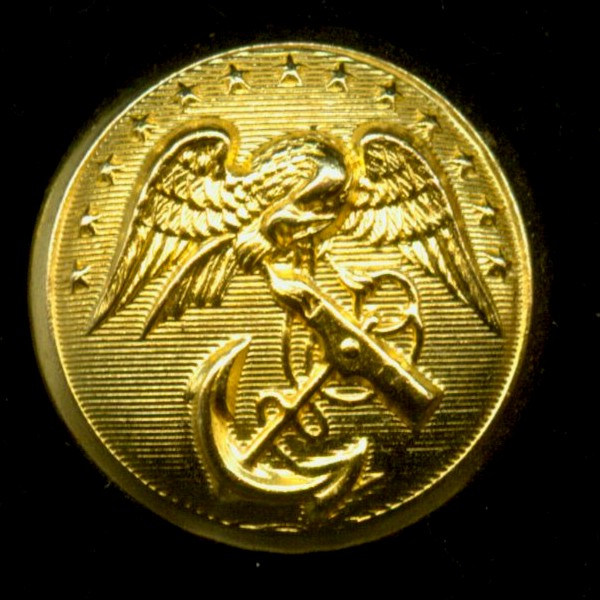
Early insignia, seen today on modern uniform buttons

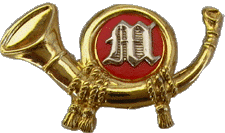
American Civil War-era USMC insignia

In 1776, the device consisted of a fouled anchor (tangled in its rope) of silver or pewter. Changes were made in 1798, 1821, and 1824. In 1834, it was prescribed that a brass eagle be worn on the cover, the eagle to measure 3.5 inches (89 mm) from wingtip to wingtip. An eagle clutching a fouled anchor with thirteen six-pointed stars above was used on uniform buttons starting in 1804. This same insignia is used today on the buttons of Marine dress and service uniforms, with the six-pointed stars changed to five-pointed stars.

During the early years numerous distinguishing marks were prescribed, including "black cockades", "scarlet plumes", and "yellow bands and tassels". In 1859, the first version of the present color scheme for the officer's dress uniform insignia appeared on an elaborate device of solid white metal and yellow metal. The design included a United States shield, half wreath, a bugle, and the letter "M."

In 1868, the USMC's commandant, Brigadier General Jacob Zeilin, appointed a board "to decide and report upon the various devices of cap ornaments of the Marine Corps." On November 13, 1868, the board recommended the modern insignia. It was approved by the commandant four days later, and by the Secretary of the Navy on November 19, 1868.

== Design and symbolism ==
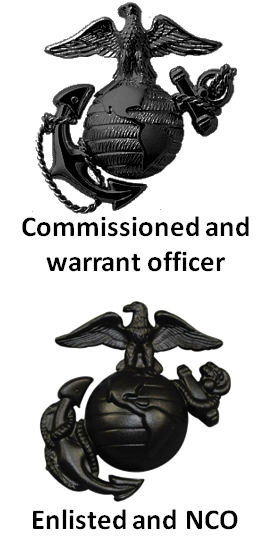

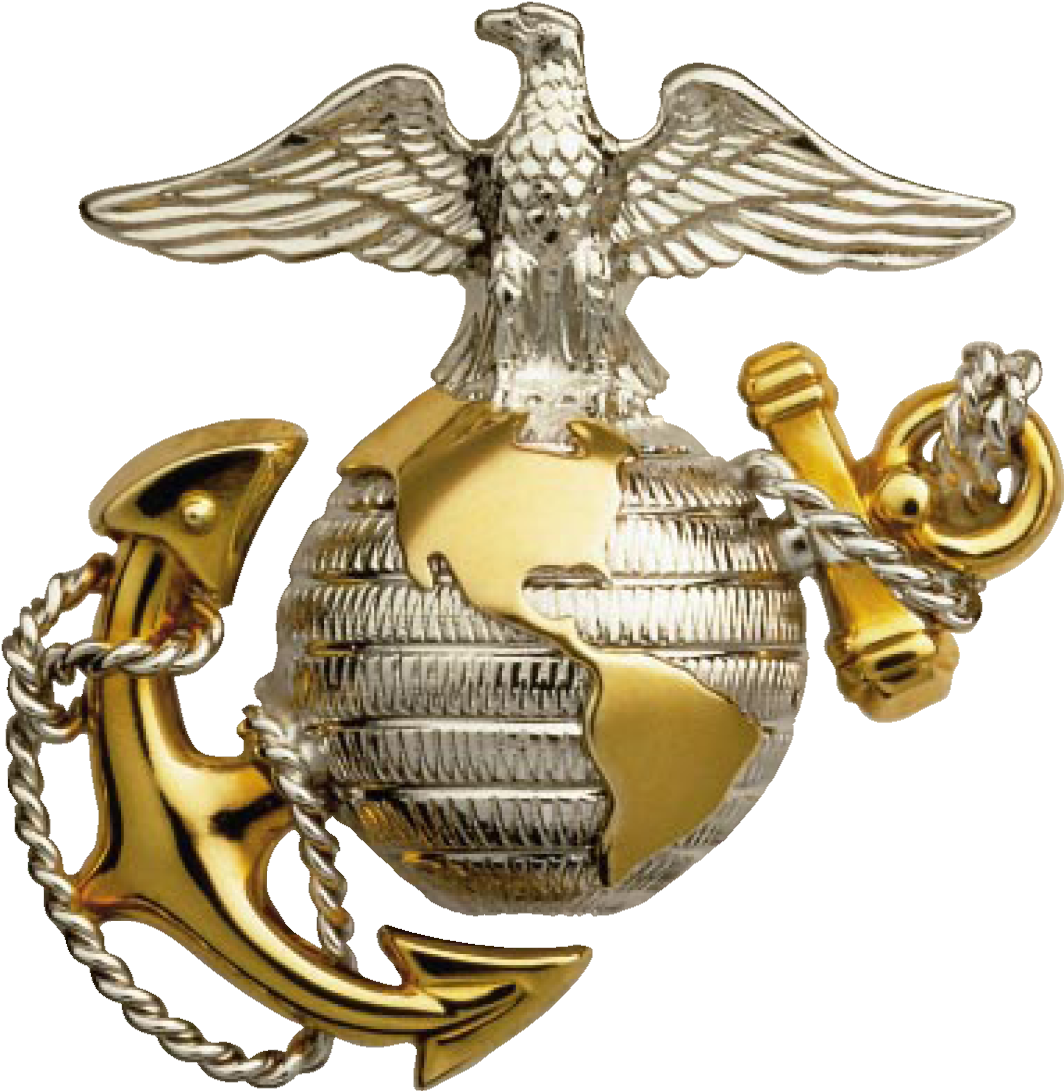
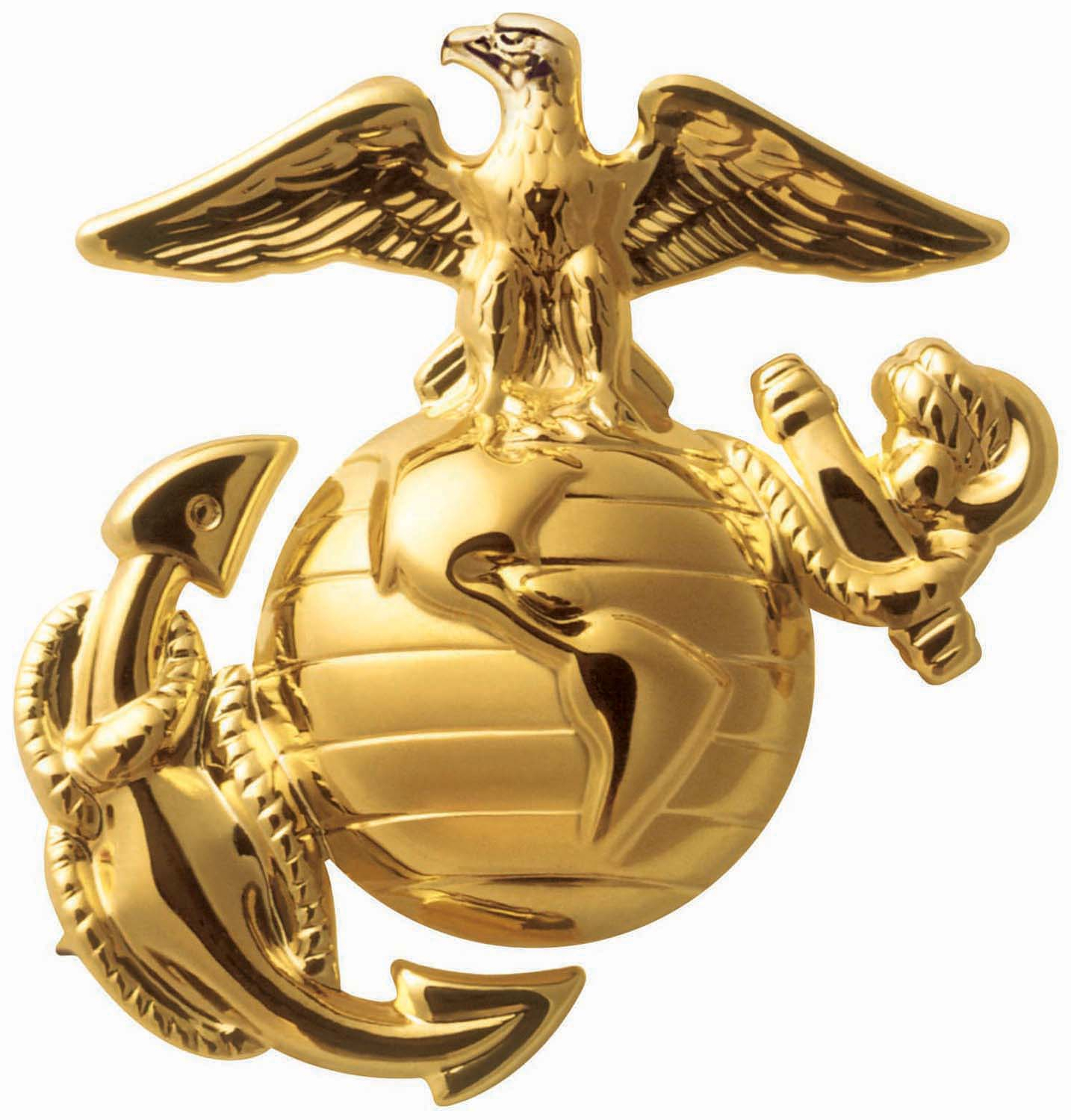
Top=officer dress, bottom=enlisted dress

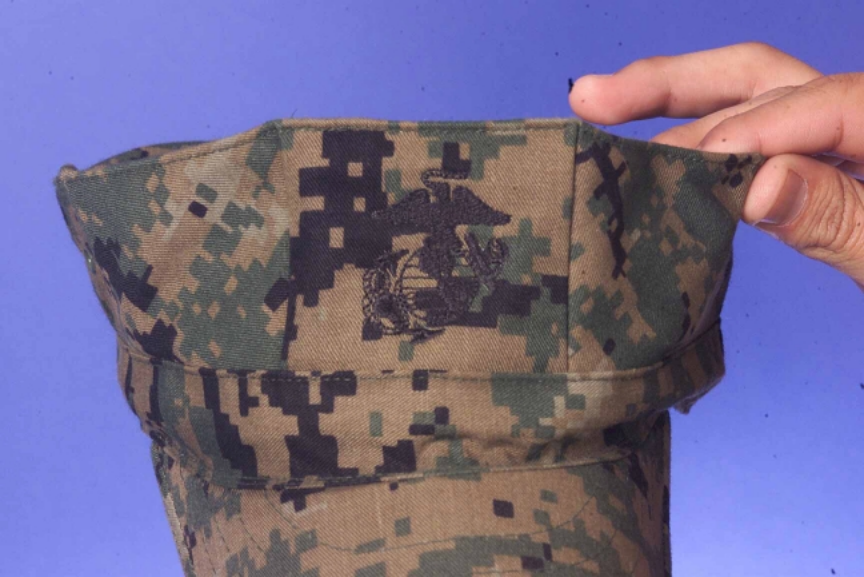
Eagle, Globe, and Anchor embroidered on an MCCUU cover in June 2002

The emblem recommended by the 1868 board consisted of a globe (showing the continents of the Western Hemisphere) intersected by a fouled anchor, and surmounted by a spread eagle, a reflection of their ability to provide power on land, sea, and air respectively. On the emblem itself, there is a ribbon, clasped in the eagle's beak, bearing the Latin motto "Semper Fidelis" (English: Always Faithful). The uniform insignias omit the motto ribbon.

The general design of the emblem was probably derived from the Royal Marines' "Globe and Laurel," which shows the eastern hemisphere. The globe on the U.S. Marine emblem signifies the Corps' readiness to service in any part of the world. The eagle represents the United States. The anchor, which dates back to the founding of the corps in 1775, acknowledges the naval tradition of the Marines and their continual service within the Department of the Navy.

There are some differences between the uniform insignia for enlisted marines and that of officers: The enlisted Marines' dress blue uniform insignia is die-struck from a single sheet of brass and anodized a gold color. The service uniform insignia is coated a flat black color.

The officers' insignia is assembled from four parts: a die-struck silver colored globe with eagle, and gold colored anchor with silver colored fouling rope, and gold colored continents.

== Current emblem and seal ==
United States Marine Corps seal

In 1954, the USMC Commandant, General Lemuel C. Shepherd, Jr., requested the design of an official seal for the corps.

The new seal included the traditional Eagle, Globe, and Anchor emblem in gold, with the Globe and anchor rope in silver. The eagle is depicted with wings displayed, standing upon the western hemisphere of the terrestrial globe, and holding in his beak a white ribbon bearing the Marine Corps motto "Semper Fidelis" (Always Faithful) with the hemisphere superimposed on a fouled anchor. An American bald eagle replaced the crested eagle depicted on the 1868 emblem.

The emblem is displayed on a scarlet background encircled with a blue band bearing the phrases "Department of the Navy" above and "United States Marine Corps" below in white letters, the whole edged in a gold rope

U.S. President Eisenhower approved the design on June 22, 1954. The emblem as shown on the seal was adopted in 1955 as the official Marine Corps emblem.

== Similar symbols ==
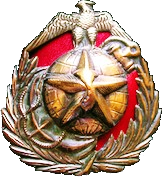
VNMC Beret Flash (metallic version)

The emblem of the U.S. Marine Corps became an inspiration of the marine corps and naval infantry insignia of other nations, such as Thailand, Taiwan, and South Korea. The Republic of Korea Marine Corps (ROKMC), the Royal Thai Marine Corps (RTMC), and the Republic of China Marine Corps (ROCMC) use an insignia that bears a resemblance to the emblem of the USMC.

The emblem of the South Korean marines consists of a golden star superimposed into the fouled anchor. The eagle is similar to that of the USMC's.

The insignia of the Thai marines is similar to that of the USMC, with the exception of a golden Garuda above the globe, and a silhouette map of Thailand.

The emblem of the Republic of China Marine Corps is similar to that of the USMC, with the exception of a Blue Sky with a White Sun above the globe, and a silhouette map of the Republic of China's claimed territories, including Mainland China and Outer Mongolia.

The Republic of Vietnam Marine Division, a.k.a. the South Vietnamese marine corps (VNMC), also used an emblem similar to that of the USMC, with the exception of a map of Vietnam and a red star superimposed onto the globe.

Emblem of the Indonesian Marine Corps

Seal of the Republic of Korea Marine Corps

Emblem of the Republic of China (Taiwan) Marine Corps

Seal of the Royal Thai Marine Corps

Patch of the Republic of Vietnam Marine Division

The Globe and Laurel of the Royal Marines, the symbol at which the EGA is based upon.

== See also ==
- Fleet Marine Force Combat Operation Insignia
- Flag of the United States Marine Corps
- History of the United States Marine Corps
- Prop and Wings
- Space Force Delta
- Henry Clay Cochrane
