= Flag of the United States Space Force =

United States Space Force flag
- Use: Other
- Adopted: 15 May 2020
- Design: Key and supporting elements of the Space Force seal over the inscription "UNITED STATES SPACE FORCE" and the year 2019 in Roman numerals in white letters and platinum fringe.

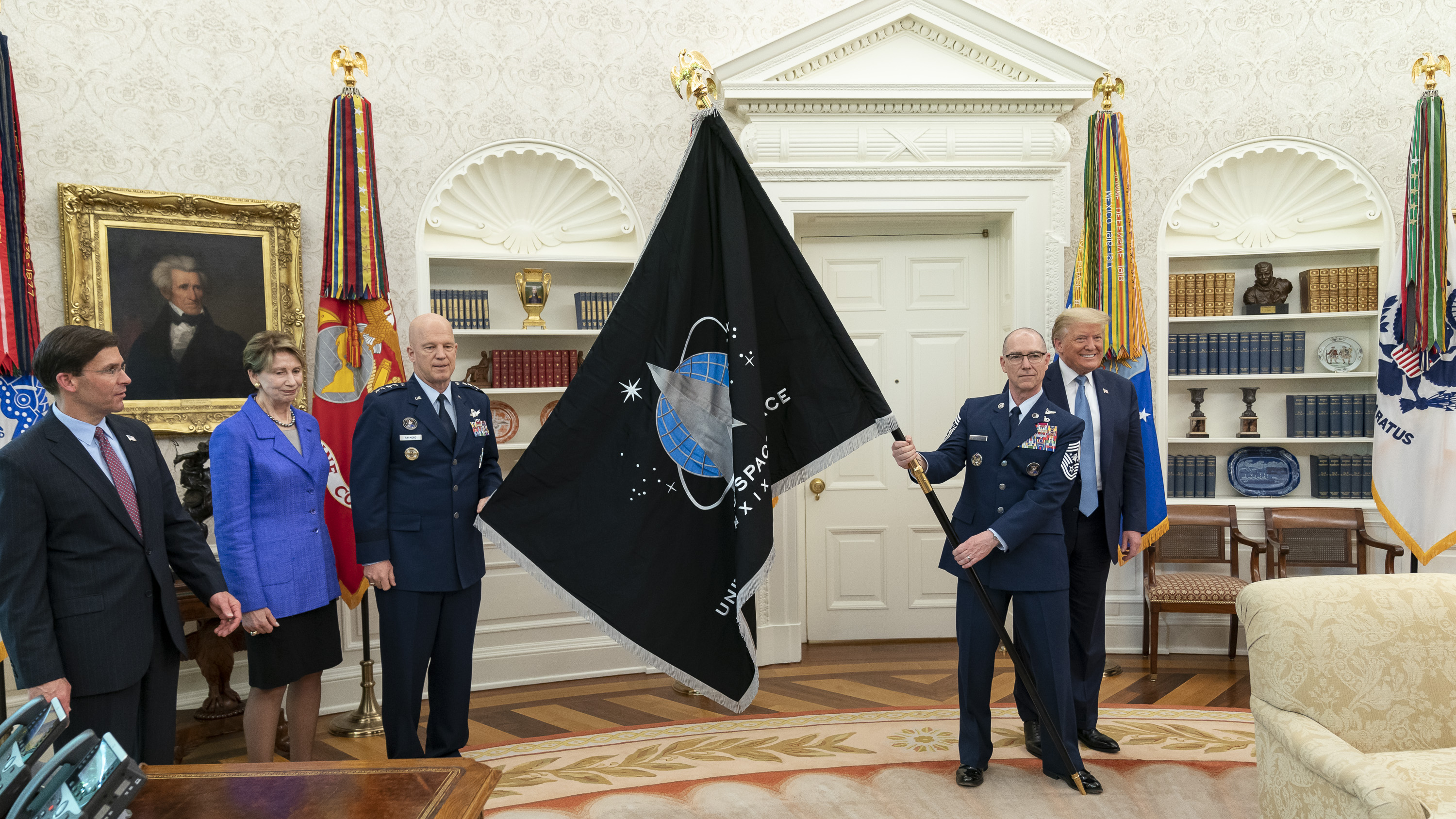
US Space Force CSO GEN Jay Raymond and US Space Force Senior Enlisted Advisor CMSgt Roger Towberman present President Donald Trump with the U.S. Space Force at a 2020 Oval Office ceremony.

The flag of the United States Space Force is the flag used to represent the U.S. Space Force and its subsidiary units and formations. It was officially unveiled on 15 May 2020.

== Design ==
The Space Force flag is a black field, with the official flag fringed in platinum. The flag is derived from the central and supporting elements of the Space Force seal, including the delta wing, globe, elliptical orbit, Polaris star, and star clusters. Beneath the central imagery "UNITED STATES SPACE FORCE" and the year 2019 in Roman numerals in white lettering, indicating the name and birth year of the service.

== History ==
The flag was unveiled on 15 May 2020 in an Oval Office ceremony by the Chief of Space Operations General John W. Raymond and the Chief Master Sergeant of the Space Force Roger A. Towberman.

== Streamers ==
Verified combat credit entitles an organization to the appropriate campaign streamers representing the named campaign in which it participated. The campaign streamer will be embroidered with the name and years of the campaign. Non-combat service is represented by an organizational service streamer, which is not embroidered.

=== Armed Forces Expeditionary ===
Armed Forces Expeditionary	
Campaign name embroidered on streamer	Date embroidered on streamer
Grenada	1983
Panama	1989–1990
Lebanon	1983–1987
Libya–El Dorado Canyon	1986
Persian Gulf	1987–1990
Somalia	1992–1995
Haiti	1994–1995
Bosnia and Herzegovina & Croatia	1995–1996
Southwest Asia	1995–1997
Southwest Asia	1995–2003
Bosnia and Herzegovina & Croatia	1996–1998
Southwest Asia	1995–2003
Bosnia and Herzegovina & Croatia	1998–2004
Southwest Asia	1997–2003
Southwest Asia	1998
Southwest Asia	1998–2003
Haiti	2004

=== Southwest Asia Service ===
Southwest Asia Service	
Campaign name embroidered on streamer	Date embroidered on streamer
Defense of Saudi Arabia	1990–1991
Liberation and Defense of Kuwait	1991
Southwest Asia Cease-fire	1991–1995

=== Kosovo Campaign ===
Kosovo Campaign	
Campaign name embroidered on streamer	Date embroidered on streamer
Kosovo Air Campaign	1999
Kosovo Defense Campaign	1999–2013

=== Afghanistan Campaign ===
Afghanistan Campaign	
Campaign name embroidered on streamer	Date embroidered on streamer
None (War service streamer)	None
Liberation of Afghanistan	2001
Consolidation I	2001–2006
Consolidation II	2006–2009
Consolidation III	2009–2011
Transition I	2011–2014
Transition II	2015–2021

=== Global war on terrorism service ===
Global War on Terrorism Service	
Campaign name embroidered on streamer	Date embroidered on streamer
None (war service streamer)	None

=== Global war on terrorism expeditionary ===
Global War on Terrorism Expeditionary	
Campaign name embroidered on streamer	Date embroidered on streamer
Global war on terrorism	None

=== Iraq Campaign ===
Iraq Campaign	
Campaign name embroidered on streamer	Date embroidered on streamer
None (War service streamer)	None
Liberation of Iraq	2003
Transition of Iraq	2003–2004
Iraq Governance	2004–2005
National Resolution	2005–2007
Iraq Surge	2007–2008
Iraq Sovereignty	2009–2010
New Dawn	2010–2011

=== Inherent Resolve Campaign ===
Inherent Resolve Campaign	
Campaign name embroidered on streamer	Date embroidered on streamer
Abeyance	2014–2015
Intensification	2015–2017
Defeat	2017–2020

== Other flags ==
Other flags include the flags of the chief of space operations, vice chief of space operations, chief master sergeant of the Space Force, and Space Force general officers.

=== Positional flags ===
Flag of the Chief of Space Operations

Flag of the Vice Chief of Space Operations

Flag of the Chief Master Sergeant of the Space Force

=== General officer flags ===
Flag of a Space Force general

Flag of a Space Force lieutenant general

Flag of a Space Force major general

Flag of a Space Force brigadier general

=== Organizational flags ===
Flag of Space Operations Command

Flag of Space Systems Command

Flag of Space Training and Readiness Command

== See also ==
- Flags of the United States Armed Forces
- Ranks and insignia of space forces
