= Prop and Wings =

Military insignia used to identify various aviation-related military units

Traditional Prop and Wings insignia, currently used in the U.S. Air Force Academy, Air Force ROTC, and Officer Training School

Prop and Wings insignia used by U.S. Army aviation

The Prop and Wings (propeller and wings) is a military insignia used to identify various aviation-related military units. A stylized propeller and wings insignia was adopted in Germany prior to the outbreak of the First World War for its Fliegertruppen des deutschen Kaiserreiches (Imperial German Flying Corps), redesignated as the Luftstreitkräfte in October 1916. The insignia was utilized by the German Air Service both as part of its officers' epaulet rank insignia and as an insignia for enlisted personal to identify their air unit of assignment. It was also seen as the central image on a badge worn by a small number of designated officers and enlisted personnel at the time of German mobilization in 1914.

The prop and wings were also widely used by the French Aeronautique Militaire. Adopted in 1912 for aviation officers and non-commissioned officers to be worn on an armband, it was often attached, instead, directly on the arm of their tunic or blouse. As worn by officers, it was embroidered in gold or silver wire and adorned with sequins on a black or light blue background. Aviation NCO's would have a rendering in red and white or gold silk. Initially worn by both flying and non flying aviation personnel, its wear was limited, in 1915, to flying personnel only.

The propeller and wings were adopted by the United States military just a few years later. The United States version of the Prop and Wings originated as branch insignia of the United States Army Air Service in 1918 (then known as the "Air Service, United States Army") during the First World War, and remained such from 1926 to 1947 for the successor United States Army Air Corps. Approximately 90% of all officers serving in the United States Army Air Forces were commissioned in the Air Corps and wore the insignia. Versions of the insignia are still used by the United States Air Force and the United States Army Aviation Branch.

The version of the Prop and Wings insignia with rounded wingtips is currently most closely associated with the United States Air Force Academy. The Prop and Wings is worn by cadets on their flight caps, appears on many of the academy's class crests, and is part of the logo of the academy's Association of Graduates. The Prop and Wings insignia is traditionally awarded to Academy cadets at the end of their grueling fourth-class (freshman) year, signifying that they have been "recognized" as upper class cadets.

Cadets in the Air Force Reserve Officer Training Corps are awarded their Prop and Wings insignia after completing Field Training and entry into the Professional Officer Course. Officer Training School allows Basic Officer and Commissioned Officer trainees as well as National Guard Officer Candidates going through the Academy of Military Science to wear the Prop and Wings during the second half of their training.

Although the standard insignia is chrome, cadets from all commissioning sources are authorized to wear a gold Prop and Wings device if they are a direct descendant of a veteran who served in the Army Air Corps, Women Air Force Service Pilots, or was a graduate of the United States Air Force Academy.

== See also ==
- Space Force Delta
- Eagle, globe, and anchor
