= Seal of the United States Space Force =

Official seal of the U.S. Space Force

- Armiger: United States Space Force
- Adopted: 15 January 2020

The Seal of the United States Space Force is the official seal of the U.S. Space Force, the space service branch of the U.S. Armed Forces. The seal itself was approved on 15 January 2020.

== Description ==
The Space Force seal is on a dark blue disc, between two constellations in white, a light blue globe grid-lined in silver surmounted by a silver delta both encircled diagonally by a white orbit ring, all beneath a white Northern star in the upper left portion of the disc and above the Roman numerals "MMXIX" (representing the year 2019, in which the organization was established) arching in white below. Encircling the disc is a dark blue designation band edged with an inner and outer border and between two deltas, the inscription "UNITED STATES SPACE FORCE" at top and "DEPARTMENT OF THE AIR FORCE" at bottom, all in white.

== Symbolism ==
- The dark blue and white colors combine to represent the vast recesses of outer space.
- The delta wing evokes historic ties to the earliest days of the U.S. Air Force space community, and symbolizes change and innovation. It also represents all variations of space vehicles that support the National Defense Strategy and National Security Space Strategy. Dark and light shades of grey within the delta embody the 24/7 operations of the Space Force, while the placement and upward orientation of the delta reveals the central role of the Space Force in defending the space domain.
- The globe represents the terrestrial home of the U.S. Space Force and its support to the joint warfighters.
- The elliptical orbit around the globe signifies defense and protection from all adversaries and threats emanating from the space domain. It also represents ongoing interagency cooperation and allied partnerships.
- The white Polaris symbolizes the guiding light of security and alludes to a constant presence and vigilance in space now and in the future.
- Two clusters of small stars represent the space assets developed, maintained, and operated by the U.S. Space Force. These elements were taken directly from the NASA logo.
- The three larger stars symbolize the Organize, Train, and Equip functions of the Space Force.

== History ==
The Delta Symbol - An Origin Story

The Seal of the United States Space Force was first approved on 15 January 2020, and was officially revealed on 24 January 2020. The seal quickly gained social media notoriety, as individuals compared it to the seal of Starfleet; however, the Space Force refuted the notion, stating that the central delta insignia was first used in 1942 by the United States Army Air Forces, and then adopted by the Air Force's early space program in 1961, years before Star Trek debuted in 1966. A number of military commentators noted that it was likely that Star Trek derived its symbolism from Air Force Space Command, rather than the other way around.

=== Air Force Space Command shield ===
The Air Force Space Command shield, which inspired the Space Force seal.

The Air Force Space Command shield, which directly inspired the seal of the U.S. Space Force, was patterned off the Space Badge and was made official with the standup of Air Force Space Command on 1 September 1982. The centrally dominant globe represents the Earth as viewed from space, the Earth being both the origin and control point for all space satellites. The lines of latitude and longitude emphasize the global nature of Air Force space operations. The emblem is provided its distinctive appearance by two symmetric ellipses representing the orbital paths traced by satellites in Earth orbit; the satellites themselves being symbolically depicted as four point stars. The 30 degree orbital inclination and symmetrically opposed placement of the satellites signify the worldwide coverage provided by Air Force satellites in accomplishing the surveillance and communications missions. The slight tapering of the orbital ellipses represents the characteristic eastward motion. The centrally superimposed deltoid symbolizes both the Air Force upward thrust into space and the launch vehicles needed to place all satellites in orbit. The distinctive dark blue background shading, small globe, and stars symbolize the space environment.

== See also ==
- Ranks and insignia of space forces
