= Air Force Falcons boxing =

College men's boxing team representing the United States Air Force Academy

The Air Force Falcons boxing team represents the United States Air Force Academy in the National Collegiate Boxing Association. Led for 31 years by Coach Ed Weichers, the team has had astounding success. It has won 18 national championships, and from 1980 to 2007, never finished lower than second in the nation. In 2008 and 2009, Air Force finished third.

== National Collegiate Boxing Association team and individual results ==
Year	Team result	Individual medals
1980	National Champions	4 gold, 3 bronze
1981	National Champions	5 gold, 3 silver, 1 bronze
1982	National Runner-up	3 gold, 2 silver, 4 bronze
1983	National Champions	7 gold, 1 silver, 3 bronze
1984	National Champions	2 gold, 3 silver, 2 bronze
1985	National Champions	4 gold, 3 silver, 2 bronze
1986	National Champions	5 gold, 4 silver
1987	National Runner-up	1 gold, 2 silver, 7 bronze
1988	National Champions	3 gold, 2 silver, 6 bronze
1989	National Champions	3 gold, 3 silver, 5 bronze
1990	National Champions	2 gold, 4 silver, 4 bronze
1991	National Runner-up	2 gold, 4 silver, 4 bronze
1992	National Champions	6 gold, 5 silver, 1 bronze
1993	National Runner-up	4 gold, 2 silver, 4 bronze
1994	National Champions	6 gold, 2 silver, 2 bronze
1995	National Champions	5 gold, 3 silver, 7 bronze
1996	National Runner-up	3 gold, 3 silver, 1 bronze
1997	National Runner-up	4 gold, 5 silver
1998	National Runner-up	2 gold, 7 silver
1999	National Champions	3 gold, 1 silver, 3 bronze
2000	National Champions	5 gold, 3 silver, 2 bronze
2001	National Champions	3 gold, 1 silver, 5 bronze
2002	National Champions	3 gold, 3 silver, 5 bronze
2003	National Champions	4 gold, 1 silver, 3 bronze
2004	National Champions	1 gold, 7 silver, 3 bronze
2005	National Runner-up	3 gold, 2 silver, 4 bronze
2006	National Runner-up	3 gold, 5 bronze
2007	National Runner-up	2 gold, 1 silver, 4 bronze
2008	National 3rd place	1 gold, 2 silver, 3 bronze
2009	National 3rd place	3 gold

== Clune Outstanding Boxer Award ==
Named after longtime Air Force athletic director John J. Clune, this award is given to the outstanding boxer in a given year.

- 1979: Bill Murphy (175 lbs.)
- 1980: Alex Cline (165 lbs.)
- 1981: Larry Steuck (185 lbs.)
- 1982: Ricky Graham (139 lbs.)
- 1983: Mike Simpson (147 lbs.)
- 1984: Steve Steadman (185 lbs.)
- 1985: Sean Amuan (125 lbs.)
- 1986: Randy Gibb (147 lbs.)
- 1987: Jeff Hunt (175 lbs.)
- 1988: Kevin King (147 lbs.)
- 1989: Clint Sigg (175 lbs.)
- 1990: Dennis Ruiz (125 lbs.)
- 1991: Jeff Moore (125 lbs.) and Russ Balka (147 lbs.)
- 1992: Bryan Dunn (156 lbs.)
- 1993: Craig Yantiss (139 lbs.)
- 1994: Arturo Alvarado (139 lbs.)
- 1995: Tony DiCarlo (125 lbs.)
- 1996: Chris Lantagne (119 lbs.)
- 1997: Mark Clifford (175 lbs.)
- 1998: Roy Blanco (132 lbs.)
- 1999: Erwin Vargas (147 lbs.)
- 2000: Michael Benza (139 lbs.)
- 2001: Joseph Harding (165 lbs.)
- 2002: Dustin Brown (195 lbs.)
- 2003: Frankie Woods (147 lbs.)
- 2004: Clell Knight (156 lbs.)
- 2005: Chris Collins (185 lbs.)
- 2006: Luis Pena (139 lbs.)
- 2007: Willie Lloyd (112 lbs.) and Joe Conrad (165 lbs.)
- 2008: Brian Navin (139 lbs.)
- 2009: Nick Cataldo (165 lbs.)
- 2010: Bailey Ball (139 lbs.)
- 2011: Mike McLain (175 lbs.)
- 2012: Glenn Miltenberg (147 lbs.)
- 2013: Glenn Miltenberg (147 lbs.)
- 2014: Denis Vorobyov (165lbs.)
- 2015: Brett Hagen (147 lbs.) and Aubrey Lowe (150lbs.)
- 2016: Pedro Barrientes (147 lbs.)
- 2017: Johnny Wells (156 lbs.)
- 2018: Levi Knox (165 lbs.)
- 2019: Cenada Clifton-Smith (175 lbs.)
- 2020: Sean Chieves (132 lbs.) and Madison Lloyd (132 lbs.)
- 2021: Alan Long (165 lbs.) and Madison Lloyd (139 lbs.)
- 2022: Tyler Dalzell (147lbs.)
