= ATO =

ATO may refer to:

== Technology ==
- Abort to Orbit, an intact abort procedure for Space Shuttle launches
- Arsenic trioxide, a potent chemotherapeutic agent for acute promyelocytic leukemia
- Assisted take off
- ATO fuse
- Automatic train operation

== Military ==
- Air Tasking Order, (United States Air Force)
- Air Training Officer, a former position at the United States Air Force Academy
- Ammunition Technical Officer, a designation in several armed forces
- Anti-Terrorist Operation in Ukraine, the Ukrainian government's operation in the war in Donbas (after 2018 it was called the Joint Forces Operation [JFO])
  - ATO zone, the official name for territory where the war in Donbas took place
- A US Navy hull classification symbol: Fleet tug, old (ATO)

== Organizations ==
- Alpha Tau Omega, an American student fraternity
- Alpha Tau Omega (Philippines), a Filipino student fraternity
- Alternative Trading Organization, an NGO focusing on Fair Trade exports
- Air Traffic Organization, a division of the Federal Aviation Administration
- Air Transportation Office (Philippines), agency of the Philippine government
- Arab Towns Organization, a network to promote cooperation between and development of Arab cities
- ATO Records, a record label
- Australian Taxation Office, the Australian government tax agency

== Other ==
- Account takeover, a form of payments and online fraud
- Amateur Try-Out, a type of ice hockey contract
- Assemble To Order, see build to order
- Asset turnover
- Atmos Energy Corporation's ticker symbol on the New York Stock Exchange
- Ato, another name for dap-ay, traditional meeting places of various ethnic groups in the northern Philippines
- ATO, the Amtrak station code for Atco (NJT station), New Jersey, U.S.A.
- ATO, abbreviation for atorvastatin
- Noah Ato-Zandanga (born 2003), Central African footballer
- Authority to Operate, part of a Risk Management Framework

== Places ==
- Ato, Yamaguchi – a Japanese town
- Ato Station

== See also ==
- Osman Ali Atto also written Osman Ali Ato, a Somali warlord
- One of three 2002 Football World Cup mascots
