= United States Air Force Academy Airfield =

Airfield near Colorado Springs, Colorado, USA

Davis Airfield
- Part of the United States Air Force Academy
- Near Colorado Springs, Colorado in United States

Site information
- Type: U.S. Air Force airfield
- Owner: Department of War
- Operator: United States Air Force
- Condition: Operational

Location
- Coordinates: 38°58′24.2091″N 104°49′12.1178″W

Garrison information
- Garrison: 306th Flying Training Group (GSU)
- Occupants: 94th FTS, 98th FTS, 306th OSS, 557th FTS

Airfield information
- Identifiers: IATA: AFF, ICAO: KAFF, FAA LID: AFF
- Elevation: 6,576 feet (2,004 m) AMSL
Runways
Direction	Length and surface
09/27	2,485 feet (757 m) Asphalt
16C/34C	4,480 feet (1,366 m) Asphalt
16L/34R	3,534 feet (1,077 m) Asphalt
16R/34L	4,500 feet (1,372 m) Asphalt

Davis Airfield, formerly the United States Air Force Academy Airfield, is located on United States Air Force Academy (IATA: AFF, ICAO: KAFF, FAA LID: AFF). It is a military (private-use) airfield near Colorado Springs, Colorado, used by the United States Air Force Academy.

On November 1, 2019, the airfield was renamed Davis Airfield. in honor of Gen. Benjamin O. Davis Jr., a Tuskegee Airman and World War II pilot.
