= United States Air Force Academy Band =

American military unit

U.S. Air Force Academy Band
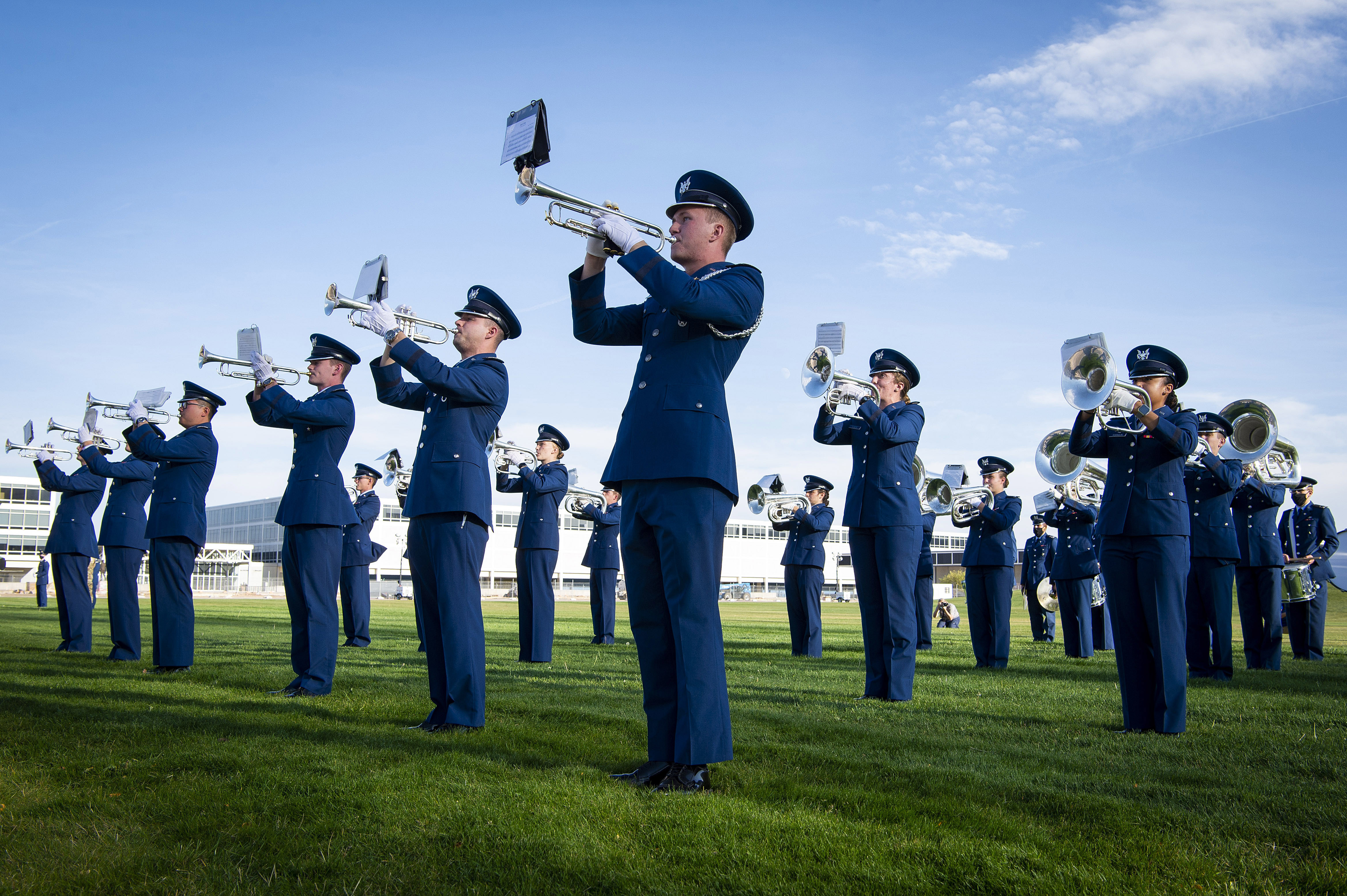
- The U.S. Air Force Academy Drum and Bugle Corps pictured in 2020.
- Active: 1955 to Present
- Country: United States
- Branch: U.S. Air Force
- Type: Military band
- Role: Public duties
- Size: 60 (Drum corps), 65 (marching band)
- Garrison/HQ: Peterson Space Force Base, Colorado Springs, Colorado
- Decorations: Air Force Outstanding Unit Award Air Force Organizational Excellence Award
- Website: www.music.af.mil/Bands/US-Air-Force-Academy-Band/

Insignia
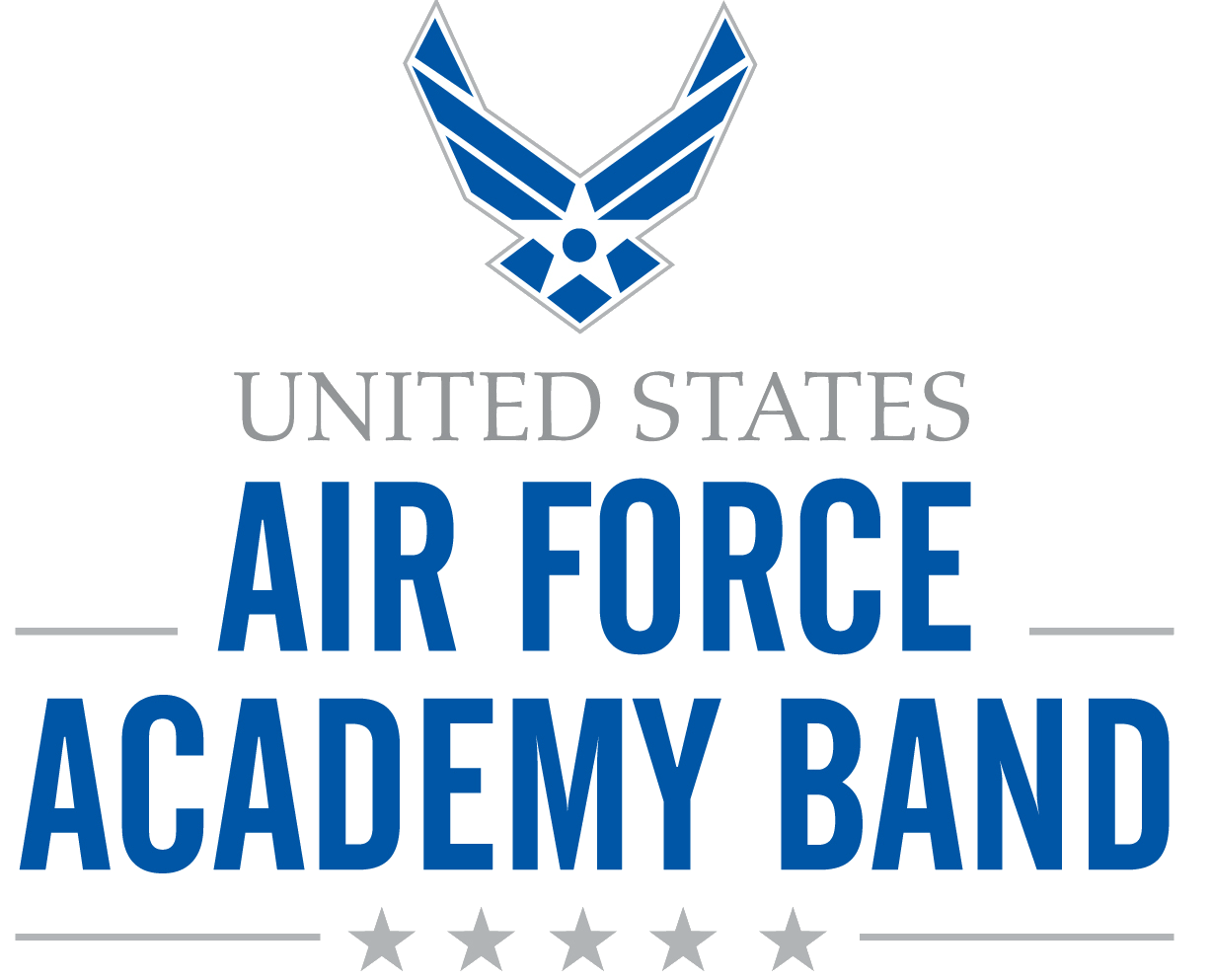
- Logo

The United States Air Force Academy Band is a United States military band based out of Peterson Space Force Base near Colorado Springs, Colorado. Despite the fact that it provides musical support to the USAFA Cadet Wing, it is an active duty full time band. The USAFA Drum and Bugle Corps is composed of cadets of the academy, similar to a college marching band. The USAFA Band uses the power of music to honor our nation's flag, leaders and veterans; inspire Airmen and Guardians and the next generation to serve; and connect the Department of the Air Force to the American public and audiences around the world in direct support of the warfighter while developing leaders of character. It is one of two premier ensembles in the Air Force, with the other being the United States Air Force Band. The band was established a Lowry Field in 1955, shortly after the foundation of the academy.

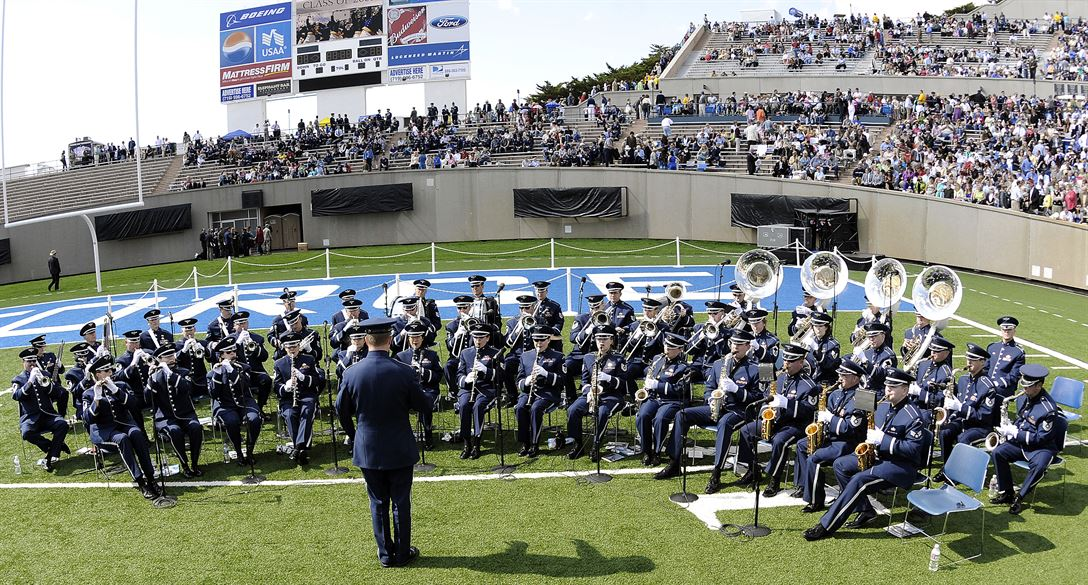
The USAFA Band performs at the 2009 USAFA graduation ceremony at Falcon Stadium.

The band is composed of the following ensembles:

March for a New Era
March for a New Era, performed by the Air Force Academy Band.

Oh Shenandoah
Oh Shenandoah, an American folk song, performed by the Air Force Academy Band.

- Marching Band
- Concert Band (45 members)
- The Falconaires
- Blue Delta
- Academy Winds
- Rampart Winds
- Stellar Brass
- Wild Blue
- Rockies Clarinets

The band performs at public/civic as well as community events. It often leads military parades at the academy or performs for Falcon fans at American football games.

== See also ==
- List of United States Air Force bands
- United States Air Force Band
- West Point Band
- United States Naval Academy Band
- United States Naval Academy Pipes and Drums
- United States Merchant Marine Academy Regimental Band
