= United States Air Force Academy Drum and Bugle Corps =

Military band of the United States Air Force

The Drum and Bugle Corps performing prior to the start of a USAFA football game against Idaho State University at Falcon Stadium.

The United States Air Force Academy Drum and Bugle Corps also known as the Flight of Sound is the drum and bugle corps of the United States Air Force Academy and a military band in the United States Armed Forces. Unlike United States Air Force Academy Band, the drum and bugle corps is staffed by USAFA cadets from the Cadet Wing. 80 cadets make up the band, with 60% of the members being from the freshman class. The two bands perform in different uniforms, with the former wearing the full dress uniform of the United States Air Force while the latter wears the standard cadet uniform. Compared to the United States Marine Drum and Bugle Corps, it is not a full time band.

It was established in 1948 in Washington, D.C. as the United States Air Force Drum and Bugle Corps, serving the entire nation. It was based at Bolling Air Force Base along with the United States Air Force Band and later the WAF Band. One-fourth of its musicians were local high school graduates who joined the air force. Master Sergeant Truman Crawford (1934 – 2003) was the senior non-commissioned officer and musical director of the band in its latter years as a national band, having gained rapid promotions since his introduction to the band as a baritone bugler. During his tenure, Crawford transformed the band into a contemporary ensemble from a stationary band with a repertoire consisting of mostly martial music. He would later become the music arranger for, and then the director of, the USMC Drum and Bugle Corps, retiring with the rank of Colonel. The corps was decommissioned and its elements were reassigned to the USAFA in 1963 and later to the cadet wing in 1972. The corps was first under the direction of Cadet Al Howey. In August 1970, Technical Sergeant Robert College became the first enlisted man in the air force to retire from a Drum & Bugle Corps when he did so that year.

Like a college marching band, it provides support for sporting events such as football and basketball games and particularly performs drill routines during the former. It plays at home and away games, having visited institutions of higher education such as Fresno State University and Idaho State University. Like many United States military bands, it supports events related to its unit (in this case the academy) and provides musical support for and on behalf of it. Many members of the USAFA Band train members of the drum and bugle corps in its musical presentation. It has been the winner of 20 inter-service academy D&B competitions. The Corps has represented the academy at the United States presidential inauguration, the Macy's Thanksgiving Day Parade, and the Tournament of Roses.

== See also ==
- Fightin' Texas Aggie Band
- HBCU band
