= United States Air Force Academy =

Military academy in El Paso County, Colorado, US

- Motto: Integrity First, Service before self, Excellence in all we do
- Type: U.S. Service Academy
- Established: 1 April 1954; 72 years ago
- Endowment: $98.937 million (2019)
- Superintendent: Lieutenant General Paul Moga, USAF
- Dean: Brigadier General James M. Valpiani, USAF
- Commandant of Cadets: Brigadier General Brandon J. Tellez, USAF
- Faculty: 570 (71% military; 29% civilian in 2013)
- Students: 4,094 cadets (2024)
- Location: Air Force Academy, Colorado, U.S. 38.9985°N 104.8541°W
- Campus: 18,500 acres (7,500 ha); Suburban
- Colors: Blue Gray
- Nickname: Falcons
- Sporting affiliations: NCAA Division I FBS – MW; MPSF, Big 12, ASUN, PRC, WCC, AHA
- Mascots: Air Force Falcons
- Decorations: Air Force Outstanding Unit Award Air Force Organizational Excellence Award
- Athletics: 27 varsity teams 17 men's and 10 women's
- Website: usafa.af.mil (Military) usafa.edu (Educational)

Location in the United States
Location in Colorado

The United States Air Force Academy (USAFA) is a United States service academy in Air Force Academy, Colorado, immediately north of Colorado Springs. It educates cadets for service in the officer corps of the United States Air Force and United States Space Force. It is the youngest of the five service academies, having graduated its first class in 1959, but is the third in seniority. Graduates of the academy's four-year program receive a Bachelor of Science degree and are commissioned as second lieutenants in the U.S. Air Force or U.S. Space Force. The academy is also one of the largest tourist attractions in Colorado, attracting approximately a million visitors each year.

Admission is competitive, with nominations divided equally among Congressional districts. Recent incoming classes have had about 1,100 cadets; since 2012, around 20% of each incoming class does not graduate. During their tenure at the academy, cadets receive tuition, room and board, and a monthly stipend all paid for by the Air Force. On the first day of a cadet's second class (third) year, cadets commit to serving eight years (five active duty and three in reserves) as a commissioned officer in the Air Force or Space Force. Non-graduates after that point may, upon recommendation to and decision by the Secretary of the Air Force, pay the costs of their educations through enlisted service or recoupment payments. The commitment is normally five years of active duty and three years in the reserves, although it has varied depending on the graduate's Air Force Specialty Code or Space Force Specialty Code. For example, cadets selected to be pilots are required to serve ten years as active duty officers after completion of training.

== History ==
=== Establishment ===
Air power advocates had pushed for a separate Air Force Academy to complement the U.S. Military Academy (founded in 1802) and Naval Academy (1845) almost since the dawn of military aviation. In 1918, Lieutenant Colonel A.J. Hanlon wrote, "As the Military and Naval Academies are the backbone of the Army and Navy, so must the Aeronautical Academy be the backbone of the Air Service. No service can flourish without some such institution to inculcate into its embryonic officers love of country, proper conception of duty, and highest regard for honor." Other officials expressed similar sentiments. In 1919, Representative Charles F. Curry introduced legislation providing for an Academy, but concerns about cost, curriculum and location led to its demise. In 1925, air power pioneer General Billy Mitchell testified on Capitol Hill that it was necessary "to have an air academy to form a basis for the permanent backbone of your air service and to attend to the ... organizational part of it, very much the same way that West Point does for the Army, or that Annapolis does for the Navy." Mitchell's arguments did not gain traction with legislators, and it was not until the late 1940s that the concept of the United States Air Force Academy began to take shape.

Support for an air academy got a boost with the National Security Act of 1947, which provided for the establishment of a separate air force within the United States military. As an initial measure, Secretary of the Air Force W. Stuart Symington negotiated an agreement where up to a quarter of West Point and Annapolis graduates could volunteer to receive their commissions in the newly established Air Force. This was only intended to be a short-term fix, however, and disagreements between the services quickly led to the establishment of the Service Academy Board by Secretary of Defense James Forrestal. In January 1950, the Service Academy Board, headed by Dwight D. Eisenhower, then president of Columbia University, concluded that the needs of the Air Force could not be met by the two existing U.S. service academies and that an air force academy should be established.

Following the recommendation of the board, Congress passed legislation in 1954 to begin the construction of the Air Force Academy, and President Eisenhower signed it into law on 1 April of that year. The legislation established an advisory commission to determine the site of the new school. Among the panel members were Charles Lindbergh, General Carl Spaatz, and Lieutenant General Hubert R. Harmon, who later became the academy's first superintendent. The original 582 sites considered were winnowed to three: Alton, Illinois (by purchasing Principia College); Lake Geneva, Wisconsin (near Big Foot Beach State Park); and the ultimate site at Colorado Springs, Colorado. The Secretary of the Air Force, Harold E. Talbott, announced the winning site on 24 June 1954. Meanwhile, Air Training Command (ATC) began developing a detailed curriculum for the academy program.

From 1954 to 1956, the new Colorado Land Acquisition Commission purchased parcels of land that would host the new academy. The first parcel purchased was also the largest; it was the 4,630-acre (1,870 ha) Cathedral Rock Ranch, owned by Lawrence B. Lehman of the Lehman investment family. The purchase price was $300,000, or about $65 per 1-acre (4,000 m^{2}). 140 parcels were eventually purchased to create what is now a nearly-18,500-acre (7,500 ha) government property.

=== Early years ===
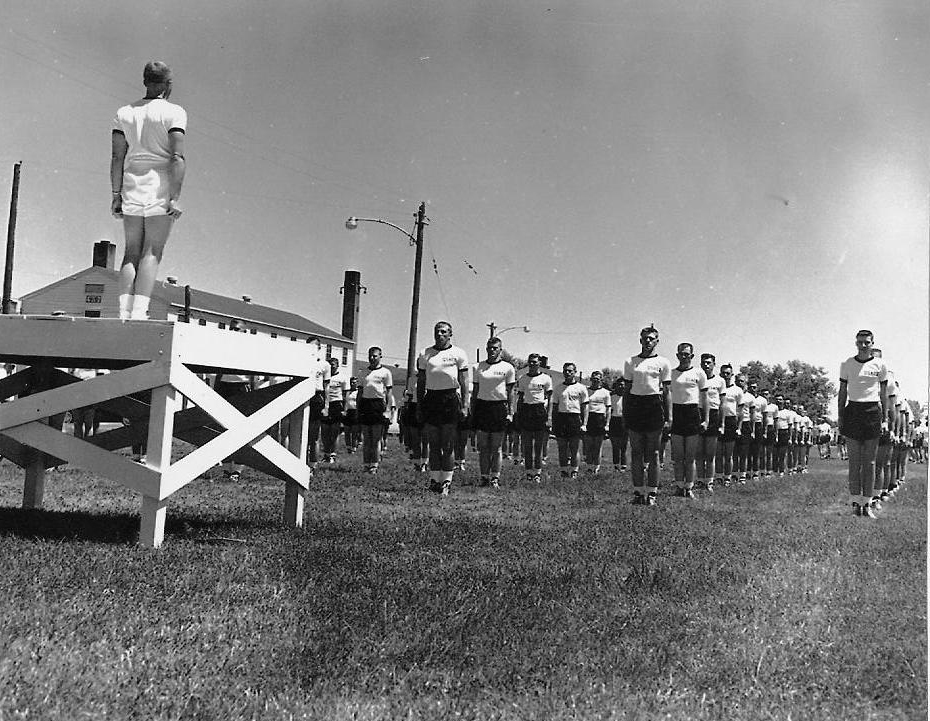
Cadets from the first USAFA class lined up for physical training at Lowry AFB in 1955

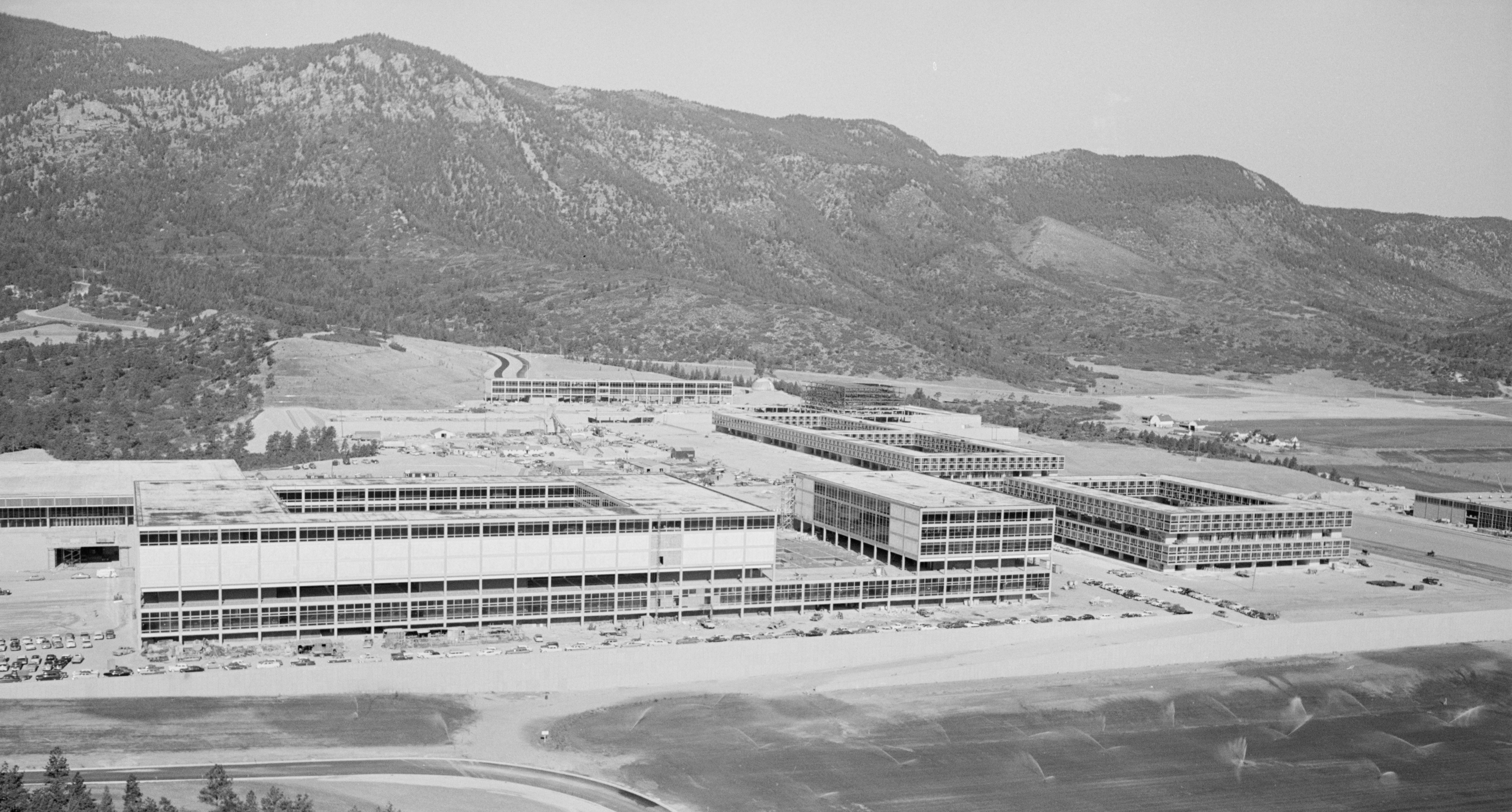
Aerial view of the academy in 1958

Early Air Force Academy leaders could look at West Point and Annapolis in designing an appropriate curriculum, faculty, and campus. The academy's permanent site had not been completed when the first class entered, so the 306 cadets from the Class of 1959 were sworn in at a temporary site at Lowry Air Force Base in Denver on 11 July 1955. While at Lowry, they were housed in renovated World War II barracks. There were no upper-class cadets to train the new cadets, so the Air Force appointed a cadre of "Air Training Officers" (ATOs) to conduct training. The ATOs were junior officers, many of whom were graduates of West Point, Annapolis, VMI, and The Citadel. They acted as surrogate upper-class cadets until the upper classes could be populated over the next several years. The academy's dedication ceremony took place on that first day and was broadcast live on national television, with Walter Cronkite covering the event. Arnold W. Braswell was commander of the original four cadet squadrons at the academy 1955 to 1958.

In developing a distinctive uniform for cadets, the Air Force turned to Hollywood. Film director Cecil B. DeMille designed the cadet parade uniform still in use.

The Class of 1959 established many other important traditions. The first class adopted the Cadet Honor Code, and chose the falcon as the Academy's mascot. On 29 August 1958, the wing of 1,145 cadets moved to the present site near Colorado Springs, and less than a year later the academy received accreditation. The first USAFA class graduated and was commissioned on 3 June 1959.

=== Vietnam ===
The Vietnam War was the first war in which academy graduates fought and died. As such, it had a profound effect on the development of the character of the academy. Due to the need for more pilots, academy enrollment grew significantly during this time. The size of the graduating classes went from 217 cadets in 1961 to 745 cadets in 1970. Academy facilities were likewise expanded, and training was modified to better meet the needs of the wartime Air Force. The Jacks Valley field training area was added, the Survival, Evasion, Resistance and Escape (SERE) program was expanded, and light aircraft training started in 1968.

Many academy graduates of this era served with distinction in the Vietnam War. F-4 Phantom II pilot Steve Ritchie '64 and weapon systems officer Jeffrey Feinstein '68 each became aces by downing five enemy aircraft in combat. 141 graduates died in the conflict; 32 graduates became prisoners of war. Lance Sijan, '65, fell into both categories and became the first academy graduate to be awarded the Medal of Honor due to his heroism while evading capture and in captivity. Sijan Hall, one of the cadet dormitories, is named in his memory.

The effects of the anti-war movement were felt at the academy as well. Because the academy grounds are generally open to the public, the academy often became a site for protests by anti-war demonstrators.

=== Women at the academy ===
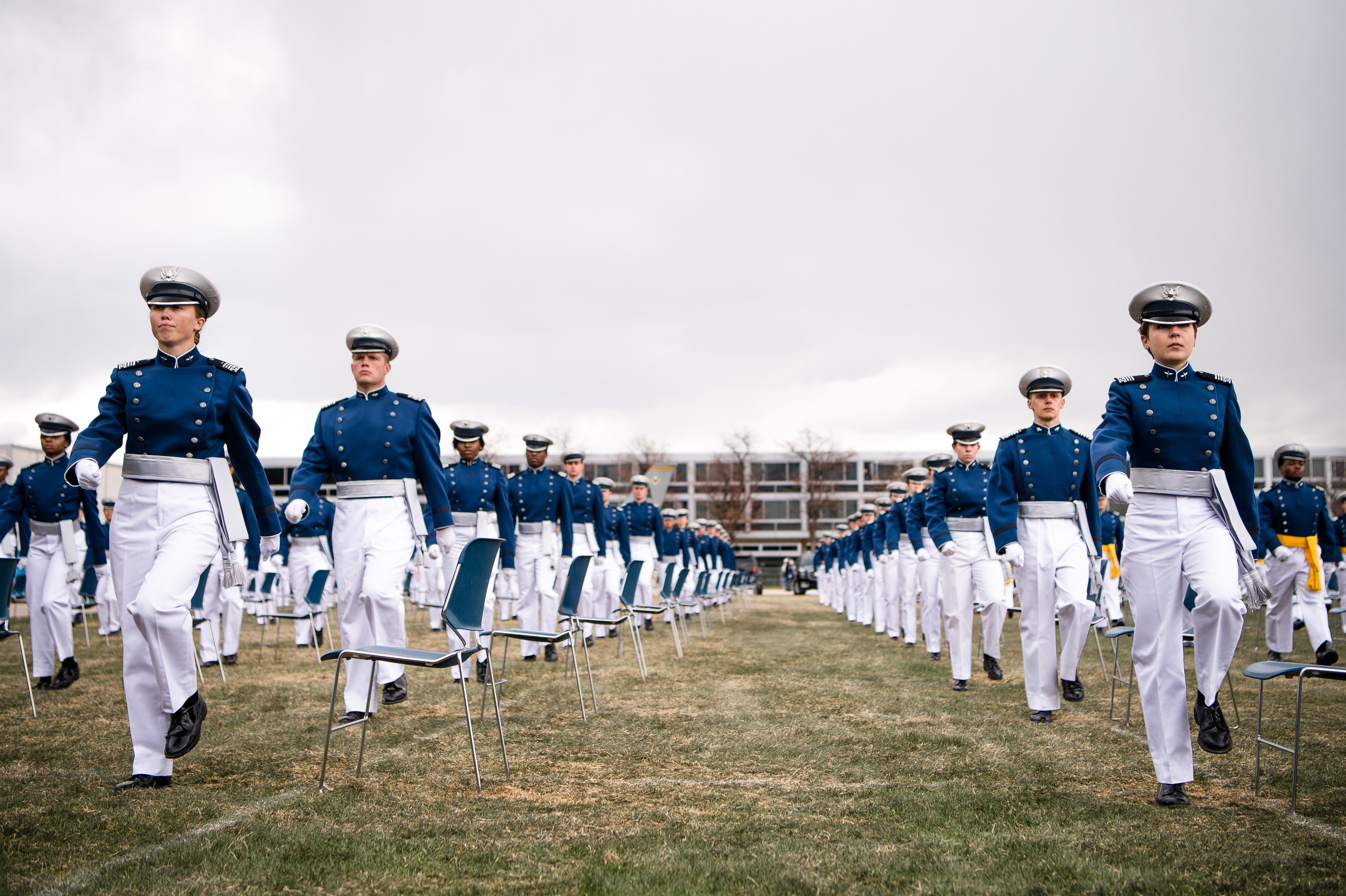
The academy's class of 2020 was the first to graduate new officers into the United States Space Force.

One of the most significant events in the history of the academy was the admission of women. On 7 October 1975, President Gerald R. Ford signed legislation permitting women to enter the United States service academies. On 28 June 1976, 157 women entered the Air Force Academy with the Class of 1980. Because there were no female upper class cadets, the Air Training Officer model used in the early years of the academy was revived, and fifteen young female officers were brought in to help with the integration process. The female cadets were initially segregated from the rest of the Cadet Wing but were fully integrated into their assigned squadrons after their first semester. On 28 May 1980, 97 of the original female cadets completed the program and graduated from the academy—just over 10% of the graduating class. Women have made up just over 20% of the most recent classes, with the class of 2016 having the highest proportion of any class, 25%.

Many of the women from those early classes went on to achieve success within the Cadet Wing and after graduation (see list of Academy graduates below). Despite these successes, integration issues were long apparent. Female cadets have had consistently higher dropout rates than men and have left the Air Force in higher numbers than men.

=== Recent history ===
In response to the COVID-19 pandemic, the academy graduated the Class of 2020 six weeks early. This was the first time that any USAFA class was ever commissioned early, and the first time for any military academy since the Vietnam War. This was also the first time that cadets were commissioned into the U.S. Space Force, with General Jay Raymond administering the oath of office to 86 graduates.

The US Space Force established its first unit at the academy when Detachment 1 of Space Delta 13 was activated in November 2021. It is expected that approximately 10% of graduates at the academy will enter the Space Force.

In 2025, the academy dropped "educate" from its mission statement.

== Campus and facilities ==
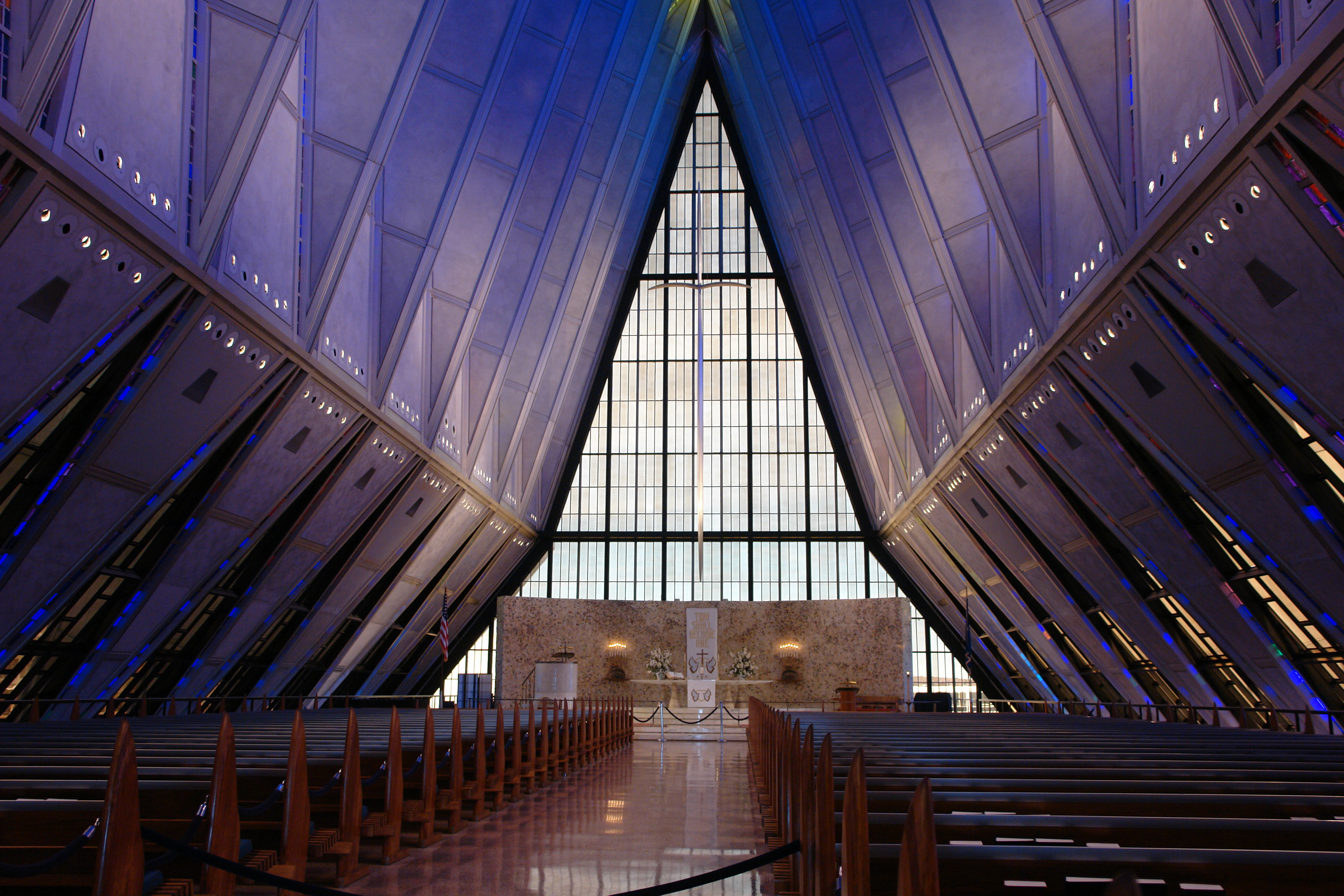
Interior of Cadet Chapel

The campus of the academy covers 18,455 acres (29 sq mi; 75 km^{2}) on the east side of the Rampart Range of the Rocky Mountains, just north of Colorado Springs. Its elevation is normally given as 7,258 feet (2,212 m) above sea level, which is at the cadet area. The academy was designed by Skidmore, Owings and Merrill (SOM) and lead architect Walter Netsch. SOM partner John O. Merrill moved from Chicago to a Colorado Springs field office to oversee the construction and to act as a spokesman for the project.

The most controversial aspect of the SOM-designed Air Force Academy was its chapel. It was designed by SOM architect Walter Netsch, who at one point was prepared to abandon the design; but the accordion-like structure is acknowledged as an iconic symbol of the academy campus.

=== The Cadet Area ===
The buildings in the Cadet Area were designed in a distinct, modernist style, and make extensive use of aluminum on building exteriors, suggesting the outer skin of aircraft or spacecraft. On 1 April 2004, fifty years after Congress authorized the building of the academy, the Cadet Area at the academy was designated a National Historic Landmark.

The main buildings in the Cadet Area are set around a large, square pavilion known as the "Terrazzo," and the most recognizable is the 17-spired Cadet Chapel. The subject of controversy when it was first built, it is now considered among the most prominent examples of modern American academic architecture. Other buildings on the Terrazzo include Vandenberg Hall and Sijan Hall, the two dormitories; Mitchell Hall, the cadet dining facility; and Fairchild Hall, the main academic building, which houses academic classrooms, laboratories, research facilities, faculty offices and the Robert F. McDermott Library.

The Aeronautics Research Center (also known as the "Aero Lab") contains numerous aeronautical research facilities, including transonic, subsonic, low speed, and cascade wind tunnels; engine and rocket test cells; and simulators. Gregory Hall was built in 1997 as an annex to Fairchild Hall. It contains chemistry and biology classrooms and labs, medical and dental clinics, and civil engineering and astronautics laboratories. The Cadet Area also contains an observatory for astronomy research. A planetarium just outside the Cadet Area, originally built for navigation training, was closed in 2004 and reopened in 2019 for use in academics, community outreach, and cadet entertainment.

The cadet social center is Arnold Hall, located just outside the Cadet Area, which houses a 2700-seat theater, a ballroom, a number of lounges, and dining and recreation facilities for cadets and visitors. Harmon Hall is the primary administration building, which houses the offices of the Superintendent and the Superintendent's staff.

The Cadet Area also contains extensive facilities for use by cadets participating in intercollegiate athletics, intramural athletics, physical education classes and other physical training. Set amid numerous outdoor athletic fields are the Cadet Gymnasium and the Cadet Fieldhouse. The Fieldhouse is the home to Clune Arena, the ice hockey rink and an indoor track, which doubles as an indoor practice facility for a number of sports. Falcon Stadium, located outside of the Cadet Area, is the football field and site of the graduation ceremonies.

=== Commemorative displays ===
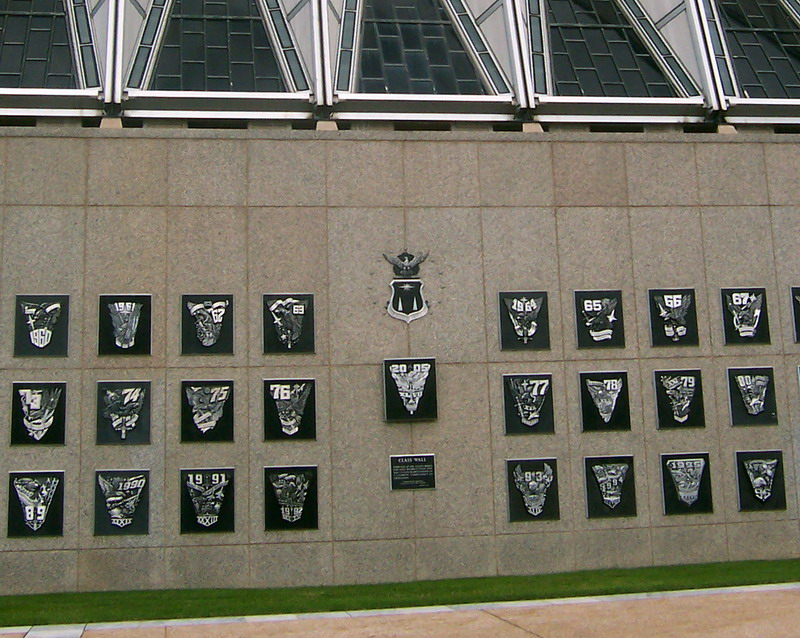
The Class Wall is located just below the Cadet Chapel.

Many displays around the Cadet Area commemorate heroes and air power pioneers, and serve as an inspiration to cadets. The War Memorial, a black marble wall located just under the flagpole on the Terrazzo, is etched with the names of academy graduates who have been killed in combat. The Honor Wall, overlooking the Terrazzo, is inscribed with the Cadet Honor Code: "We will not lie, cheat, or steal, nor tolerate among us anyone who does." Just under the Cadet Chapel, the Class Wall bears the crests of each of the academy's graduating classes. The crest of the current first (senior) class is displayed in the center position. Another display often used as a symbol of the academy, the Eagle and Fledglings Statue was given as a gift to the academy in 1958 by the personnel of Air Training Command. It contains the inscription by Austin Dusty Miller, "Man's flight through life is sustained by the power of his knowledge." Static air- and spacecraft displays on the academy grounds include a F-4C, F-15A, YF-16A and F-105D on the commandant's lawn; a B-52 by the north gate; a T-38 and an A-10A at the academy airfield; an F-100D by the preparatory school; a SV-5J lifting body next to the aeronautics laboratory; and a Minuteman III missile in front of the fieldhouse. The Minuteman III was removed 18 years ago in August 2008 due to rusting and other internal damage.

The "Core Values Ramp" (formerly known as the "Bring Me Men Ramp") leads down from the main terrazzo level toward the parade field. On in-processing day, new cadets arrive at the base of the ramp and start their transition into military and academy life by ascending the ramp to the Terrazzo. From 1964 to 2004, the portal at the base of the ramp was inscribed with the words "Bring me men ..." taken from the poem, "The Coming American," by Samuel Walter Foss. In a controversial move following the 2003 sexual assault scandal, the words "Bring me men ..." were taken down and replaced with the academy's (later adopted as the Air Force's) core values: "Integrity first, service before self, and excellence in all we do."

=== Education of dependent children ===
USAFA is within the Academy School District 20. The zoned schools for areas on post are: Douglass Valley Elementary, Eagle View Middle School, and Air Academy High School.

With an enrollment of over 1300, Air Academy High School is the only high school in the United States built on a military academy. It ranks in the top ten in the state in academic standards. Part of School District 20 (D20), its marching band regularly places in the top ten in state championships. D20 also maintains an elementary school on the academy grounds.

=== Other locations on campus ===
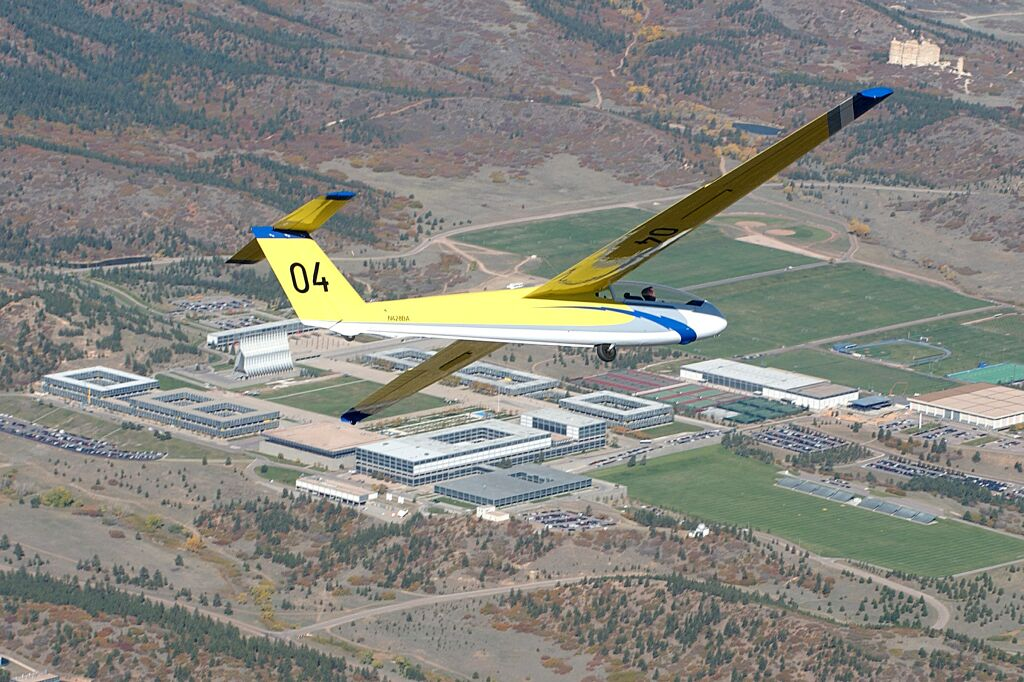
Cadets have the opportunity to fly gliders as part of their training.

Other locations on campus serve support roles for cadet training and other base functions. Doolittle Hall is the headquarters of the academy's Association of Graduates and also serves as the initial reception point for new cadets arriving for Basic Cadet Training. It is named after General Jimmy Doolittle. The Goldwater Visitor Center, named after longtime proponent of the academy United States Senator Barry Goldwater, is the focal point for family, friends and tourists visiting the academy grounds. Davis Airfield, named after Gen. Benjamin O. Davis Jr., is used for training cadets in airmanship, including parachute training, soaring, and powered flight. Interment at the Academy Cemetery is limited to academy cadets and graduates, certain senior officers, certain academy staff members, and certain other family members. Air power notables Carl Spaatz, Curtis E. LeMay and Robin Olds, are interred here.

The United States Air Force Academy Preparatory School (usually referred to as the "Prep School") is a program offered to selected individuals who were not able to obtain appointments directly to the academy. The program involves intense academic preparation (particularly in English, math and science), along with athletic and military training, meant to prepare the students for appointment to the academy. A high percentage of USAFA Preparatory School students (known as "Preppies") earn appointments to the academy following their year at the Prep School.

== The Honor Code and character education ==
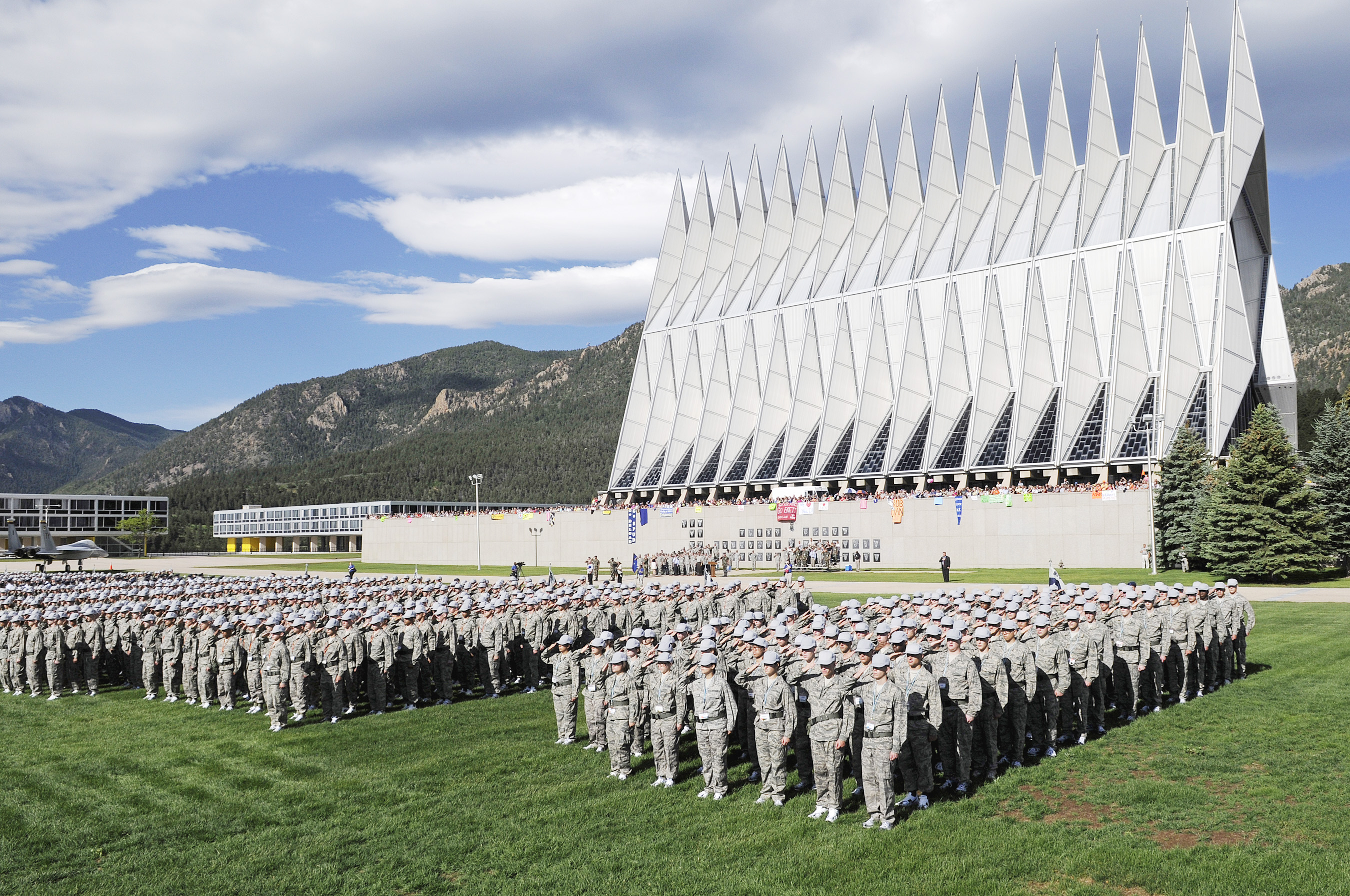
More than 1,300 basic cadets salute during the ceremonial Oath of Office formation on 26 June 2009. The Cadet Chapel is in the background.

The Cadet Honor Code is the cornerstone of a cadet's professional training and development – the minimum standard of ethical conduct that cadets expect of themselves and their fellow cadets. The Honor Code was developed and adopted by the Class of 1959, the first class to graduate from the academy and has been handed down to every subsequent class. The Code itself is simple:

We will not lie, steal, or cheat, nor tolerate among us anyone who does.

In 1984, the Cadet Wing voted to add an "Honor Oath," which was to be taken by all cadets. The oath is administered to fourth class cadets (freshmen) when they are formally accepted into the Wing at the conclusion of Basic Cadet Training. The oath remains unchanged since its adoption in 1984 and consists of a statement of the code, followed by a resolution to live honorably (the phrase "So help me God" is now optional):

We will not lie, steal or cheat, nor tolerate among us anyone who does. Furthermore, I resolve to do my duty and to live honorably, (so help me God).

— "Honor Code Handbook"

Cadets are considered the "guardians and stewards" of the code. Cadet honor representatives are chosen by senior leadership, and oversee the honor system by conducting education classes and investigating suspected honor violations. Cadets throughout the Wing are expected to sit on Honor Boards as juries that determine whether their fellow cadets violated the code. Cadets also recommend sanctions for violations. The presumed sanction for an honor violation is disenrollment, but mitigating factors may result in the violator being placed in a probationary status for some period of time. This "honor probation" is usually only reserved for cadets in their first two years at the academy.

To reinforce the importance of honor, character and integrity to future officers, cadets are given an extensive character and leadership curriculum. The academy's Center for Character and Leadership Development provides classroom, seminar, workshop and experiential-based learning programs to all cadets, beginning when they enter Basic Cadet Training and continuing each year through their last semester at the academy. The center's programs, when coupled with the Honor Code and Honor System, establish a foundation for the "leaders of character" that the academy aspires to produce.

== Organization ==
The academy's organization is unusual in a number of respects. Because it is primarily a military unit, much of the academy's structure is set up like that of any other Air Force Base. This is particularly true of the non-cadet units—most assigned to the 10th Air Base Wing—that provide base services such as security, communications, and engineering. Because the academy is also a university, however, the organization of the faculty and the Cadet Wing have some aspects that are more similar to the faculty and student body at a civilian college.

=== The Cadet Wing ===
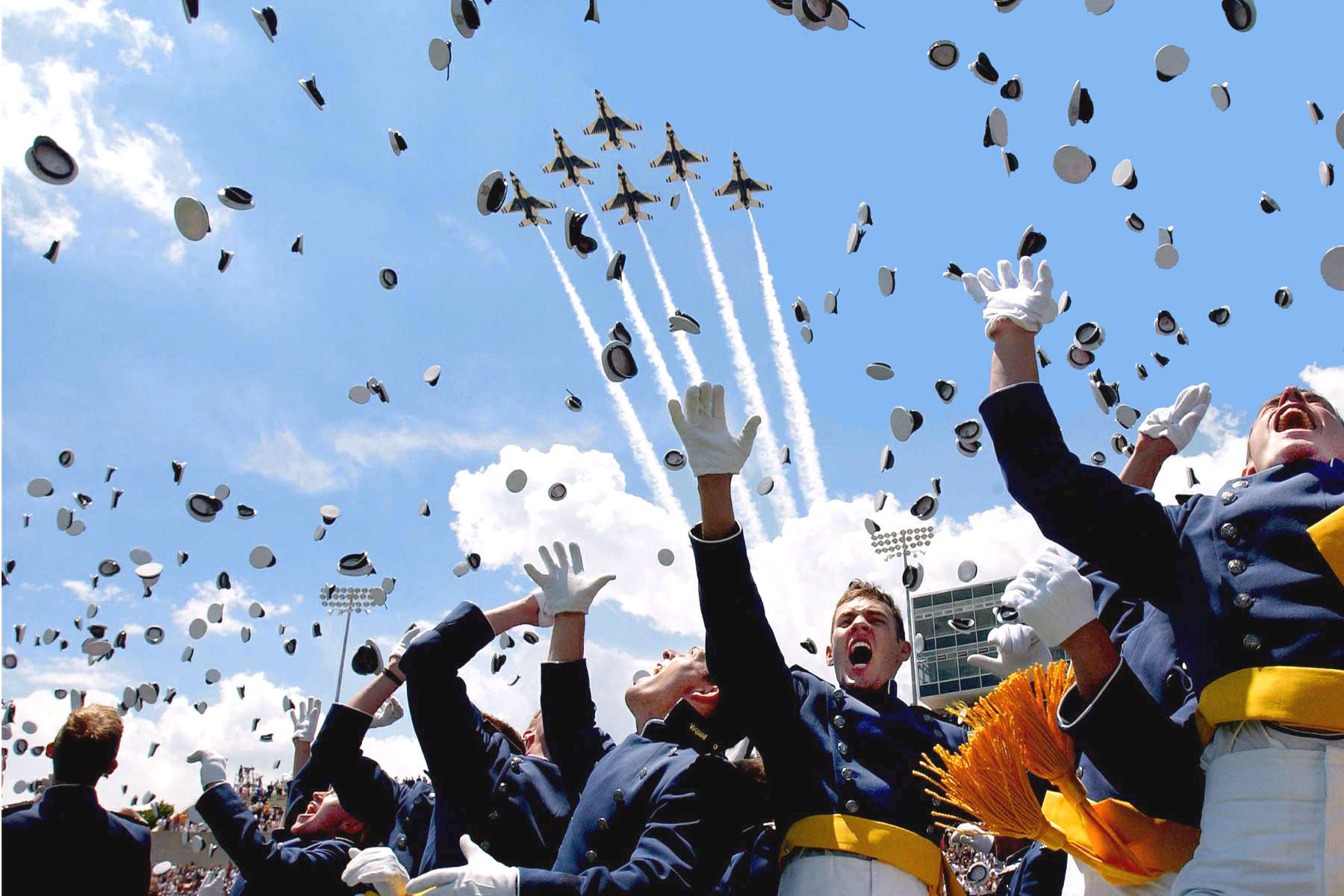
Air Force Academy cadets celebrate after graduation.

The student body of the academy is known as the Cadet Wing. The students, called "cadets", are divided into four classes, based on their year in school, much like a civilian college. They are not referred to as freshmen, sophomores, juniors and seniors, however, but as fourth-, third-, second- and first class cadets, respectively. Fourth class cadets (freshmen) are often referred to as "doolies," a term derived from the Greek word δοῦλος ("doulos") meaning "slave" or "servant." Members of the three lower classes are also referred to as "4 degrees," "3 degrees" or "2 degrees" based on their class. First-class cadets (seniors) are referred to as "firsties." In the military structure of the Cadet Wing, first class cadets hold the positions of cadet officers, second class cadets act as the cadet non-commissioned officers and third class cadets represent the cadet junior non-commissioned officers.

The Cadet Wing is divided into four groups, of ten cadet squadrons each. Each cadet squadron consists of about 110 cadets, roughly evenly distributed among the four classes. Selected first-, second- and third-class cadets hold leadership, operational and support jobs at the squadron, group and wing levels. Cadets live, march and eat meals with members of their squadrons. Military training and intramural athletics are conducted by squadron as well. Each cadet squadron and cadet group is supervised by a specially selected active duty officer called an Air Officer Commanding (AOC). In the case of a cadet squadron, the AOC is normally an active duty Air Force or Space Force major or lieutenant colonel. Occasionally, officers of equivalent rank from the Army, Navy, or Marines may be selected as an AOC for a squadron while on active duty at the academy. For a cadet group, the AOC is normally an active-duty colonel. These officers have command authority over the cadets, counsel cadets on leadership and military career issues, oversee military training and serve as role models for the future officers. In addition to an AOC, cadet squadrons and groups are also supervised by an active duty non-commissioned officer known as an Academy Military Trainer (AMT), who fulfills a similar job as the AOC.

=== Base organization ===
The superintendent of the United States Air Force Academy is the commander and senior officer. The position of superintendent is normally held by an active-duty lieutenant general. The superintendent's role is roughly similar to that of the president of a civilian university. As such, the superintendent oversees all aspects of the academy, including military training, academics, athletics, admissions and also functions as the installation commander of the Academy Reservation. The academy is a Direct Reporting Unit within the Air Force, so the superintendent reports directly to the Chief of Staff of the Air Force.

Those reporting to the superintendent include the vice superintendent, dean of the faculty, commandant of cadets, each of whom typically holds the rank of major general or brigadier general. The Superintendent also supervises the director of athletics, the commander of the 10th Air Base Wing and the commander of the Prep School, each of whom typically holds the rank of colonel. The 10th Air Base Wing provides all base support functions that exist at other air force bases, including civil engineering, communications, medical support, personnel, administration, security, and base services. The Preparatory School provides an academic, athletic and military program for qualified young men and women who may need certain additional preparation prior to acceptance to the academy. All flying programs at the academy are run by the 306th Flying Training Group, which until recently reported to the Air Education and Training Command, but now falls under the Academy's leadership.

=== Board of Visitors ===
Congressional oversight of the academy is exercised through a 15-member Board of Visitors (BoV), established under Title 10, United States Code, Section 9455, and governed by the Federal Advisory Committee Act and the BoV Charter. The board inquires into the morale, discipline, curriculum, instruction, physical equipment, fiscal affairs, academic methods and other matters relating to the academy. The board " shall visit the Academy annually" and "typically held at least twice annually with one meeting being at the USAF Academy". The Board prepares semi-annual reports containing its views and recommendations submitted concurrently to the Secretary of Defense, the Senate Armed Services Committee, and the House Armed Services Committee. The 15 members of the BoV are appointed by the president of the United States, the vice president, the Senate and House Armed Services Committees, and the Speaker of the House of Representatives. Since 2006, the board has been required to include at least two academy graduates. In July 2009, Speaker Nancy Pelosi appointed Colorado Congressman Jared Polis to the BoV, the first openly gay person to serve on a service academy's advisory board.

There was controversy in December 2020 when President Trump made two lame duck appointments to the BoV: Kellyanne Conway and Heidi Stirrup. Secretary of Defense Austin suspended Defense advisory boards for a review in February 2021. President Biden asked them to resign in September 2021. Stirrup sued the Defense Department in July 2021 over the suspension of the board and in an attempt to remain on the board, however, the lawsuit was dismissed on 9 May 2022.

In March 2025, Donald Trump assigned Sen. Tommy Tuberville, Doug Nikolai, Dan Clark, conservative activist Charlie Kirk, and Dina Powell to the board.

In March 2026, Kirk's widow Erika Kirk was appointed to a seat on the board.

== Based units ==
Numerous regular USAF units are based at the academy. Units marked GSU are Geographically Separate Units, which, although based at the U.S. Air Force Academy, are subordinate to a parent unit based at another location.

=== United States Air Force ===
Direct Reporting Unit

- United States Air Force Academy
  - 10th Air Base Wing (Host Wing)
    - 10th Medical Group
      - 10th Aerospace Medicine Squadron
      - 10th Dental Squadron
      - 10th Medical Operations Squadron
      - 10th Medical Support Squadron
      - 10th Surgical Operations Squadron
    - 10th Mission Support Group
      - 10th Civil Engineering Squadron
      - 10th Communications Squadron
      - 10th Contracting Squadron
      - 10th Force Support Squadron
      - 10th Logistics Readiness Squadron
      - 10th Security Forces Squadron

Air Education and Training Command (AETC)

- Nineteenth Air Force
  - 12th Flying Training Wing
    - 306th Flying Training Group (GSU)
      - 94th Flying Training Squadron – TG-15A Duo Discus, TG-15B Discus 2, TG-16A
      - 98th Flying Training Squadron – UV-18B Twin Otter
      - 306th Operations Support Squadron
      - 557th Flying Training Squadron – T-53A

=== United States Space Force ===
Space Training and Readiness Command (STARCOM)

- Space Delta 10
- Space Delta 13
  - Detachment 1

== Military training ==
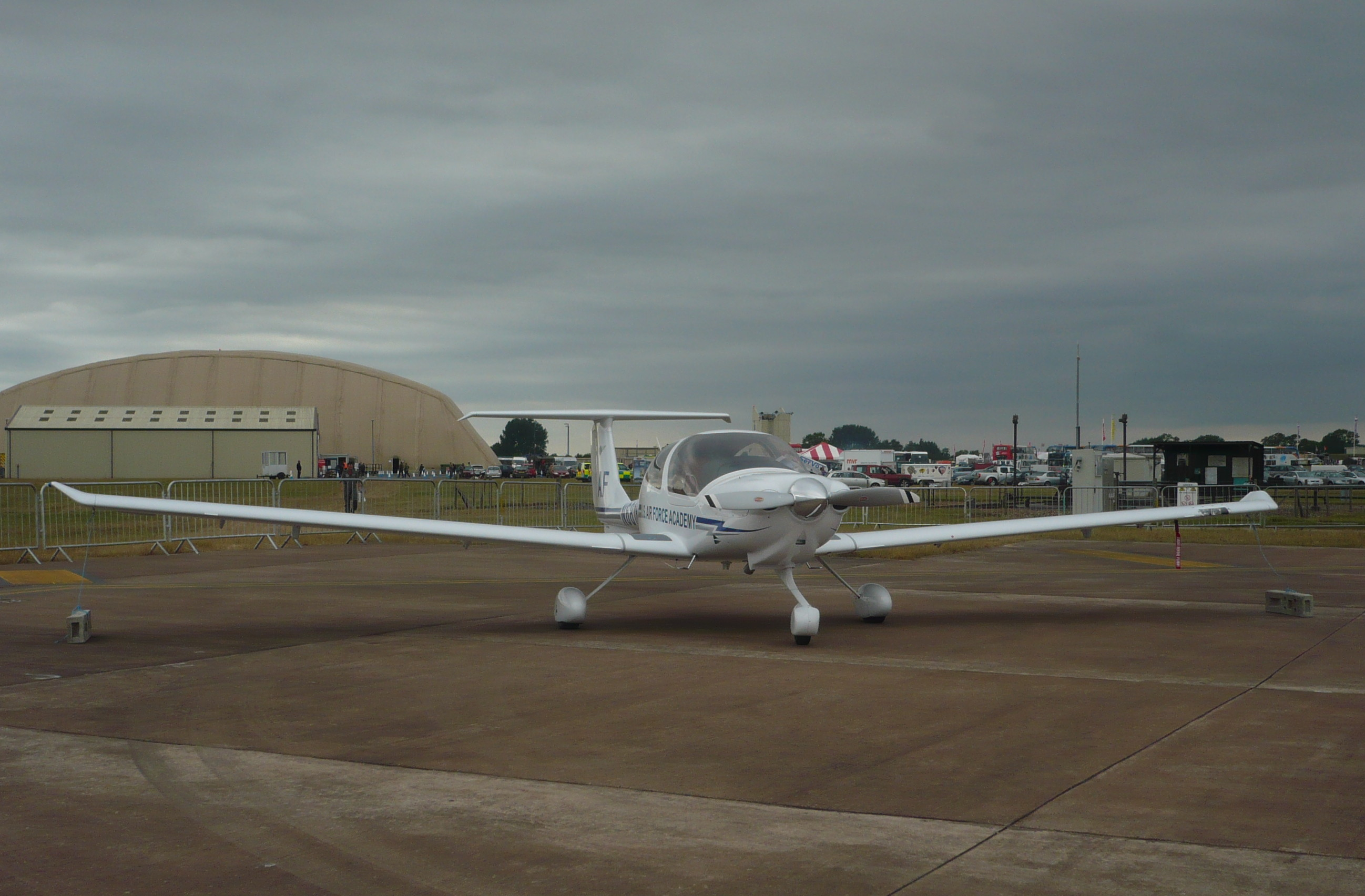
DA40 of USAFA at RIAT 2010

Cadets' military training occurs throughout their time at the academy, but is especially intense during their four summers. The first military experience for new cadets (called "basic cadets") occurs during the six weeks of Basic Cadet Training (BCT), in the summer before their fourth class (freshman) year. During BCT, also known as "Beast," cadets learn the fundamentals of military and Academy life under the leadership of a cadre of first and second class cadets. Basic cadets learn military customs and courtesies, proper wear of the uniform, drill and ceremony, study military knowledge, and undergo a rigorous physical training program based on Air Force fitness standards.

During the second half of BCT, basic cadets march to Jacks Valley, where they complete the program in a field encampment environment. Upon completion of BCT, basic cadets receive their fourth-class shoulder boards, take the Honor Oath, and are formally accepted as members of the Cadet Wing.

The fourth-class (freshman) year is traditionally the most difficult at the academy, militarily. In addition to their full academic course loads, heavy demands are placed on fourth-class cadets outside of class. Fourth-class cadets are expected to learn an extensive amount of military and Academy-related knowledge and have significant restrictions placed on their movement and actions—traversing the Cadet Area only by approved routes (including staying on the marble "strips" on the Terrazzo) and interacting with upper class cadets using a very specific decorum. The fourth-class year ends with "Recognition," a physically and mentally demanding several-day event which culminates in the award of the Prop and Wings insignia to the fourth-class cadets, signifying their ascension to the ranks of upper class cadets. After Recognition, the stringent rules of the fourth-class year are relaxed.

After the first year, cadets have more options for summer military training. Between their fourth and third class years, cadets undergo training in interpersonal and small team unit training during Adventure Based Learning (ABL) and may participate in flying gliders, cyber-warfare training, satellite and space operations, unmanned systems, or free-fall parachute training. From the late 1960s until the mid-1990s, all cadets completed SERE training in the Jacks Valley complex between their fourth- and third-class years. This program was replaced with Combat Survival Training (CST) in 1995 and done away with entirely in 2005. In the summer of 2008, the CST program was reintroduced, but was cut again in 2011 and replaced with Expeditionary, Survival, and Evasion Training (ESET) for the summer of 2012 through the Summer of 2020. During their last two summers, cadets may serve as BCT cadre, travel to active duty Air Force bases and participate in a variety of other research, aviation and leadership programs. They may also be able to take courses offered by other military services, such as the U.S. Army's Airborne School at Fort Benning, Georgia, or the Air Assault School, at Fort Campbell, Kentucky. During the academic year, all cadets take formal classes in military theory, operations and leadership.Academics

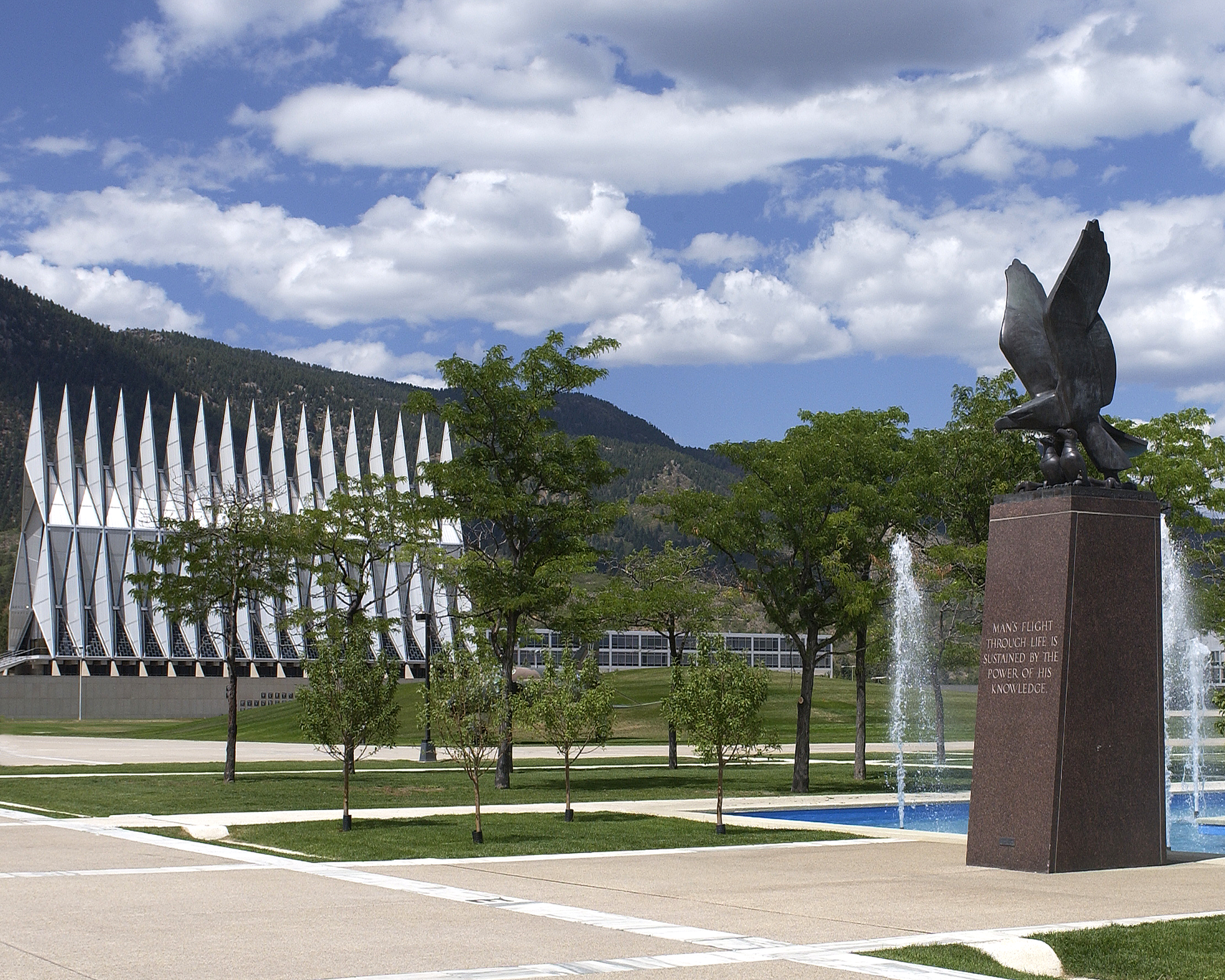
The Eagle and Fledglings Statue at the south end of the Air Gardens is inscribed with the quote, "Man's flight through life is sustained by the power of his knowledge".

The Air Force Academy is an accredited four-year university offering bachelor's degrees in a variety of subjects. Active-duty Air Force and Space Force officers make up approximately 70 percent of the faculty, with the balance being long-term civilian professors, visiting professors from civilian universities and instructors from other U.S. and allied foreign military services. In recent years, civilians have become a growing portion of senior faculty.

Every dean of the faculty (equivalent to a provost at most universities) has always been an active-duty brigadier general, although technically, a civilian may hold the position. The dean, the vice dean, and each academic department chair hold the academic rank of permanent professor. Permanent professors are nominated by the president of the United States and approved by the Senate, and can serve until age 64.

All graduates receive a Bachelor of Science degree, regardless of major, because of the technical content of the core requirements. Cadets may choose from a variety of majors, including engineering, the basic sciences, social sciences and humanities, as well as in a variety of divisional or inter-disciplinary subjects. The academic program has an extensive core curriculum, in which all cadets take required courses in the sciences, engineering, social sciences, humanities, military studies and physical education. Approximately sixty percent of a cadet's course load is mandated by the core curriculum. As a result, most of a cadet's first two years are spent mostly in core classes. While core requirements remain significant during the third and fourth years, cadets have more flexibility to focus in their major areas of study, allowing them to participate in international and inter-service Academy exchange programs.

Traditionally, the academic program at the Air Force Academy (as with military academies in general) has focused heavily on science and engineering, with the idea that many graduates would be expected to manage complex air, space and information technology systems. As a result, the academy's engineering programs have traditionally been ranked highly. Over time, however, the academy broadened its humanities offerings. About 47% of cadets typically select majors in non-technical disciplines. The academy's recent implementation of a computer and network security program may represent a return to form.

Externally funded research at the Air Force Academy has been a large and growing part of the technical majors. Air Force has ranked highest of all undergraduate-only universities in federally funded research as reported by the National Science Foundation, surpassing $60 million in 2010. Many cadets are involved in research via their major, coordinated in more than a dozen Academy research centers, including the Institute for Information Technology Applications, the Institute for National Security Studies, the Air Force Humanities Institute, the Eisenhower Center for Space and Defense Studies, the Life Sciences Research Center, the Academy Center for Physics Education Research, among others.

=== Cyber Competition Team ===
The Air Force Academy has a Cyber Competition team that operates under the Dean of the Faculty and the Department of Computer and Cyber Science.

In November 2017, teams from the Air Force Academy took both first and second in a competition against the U.S. Military Academy, the U.S. Naval Academy, and the U.S. Coast Guard Academy at the CyberStakes Live competition in Las Vegas, Nevada.

In March 2019, the team won the Atlantic Council's national Cyber 9/12 Strategy Challenge in Washington, DC.

In April 2019, the National Security Agency announced that the U.S. Air Force Academy was the winner of the 2019 NSA Cyber Exercise. The events included forensics, cyber policy, data analysis, software development, and a cyber combat scenario.

In 2018, the USAFA Class of 1968 announced that they would adopt the Cyber Team, with the goal of raising over $500,000 to establish a permanent endowment to cover travel expenses and other costs.

== Athletics ==
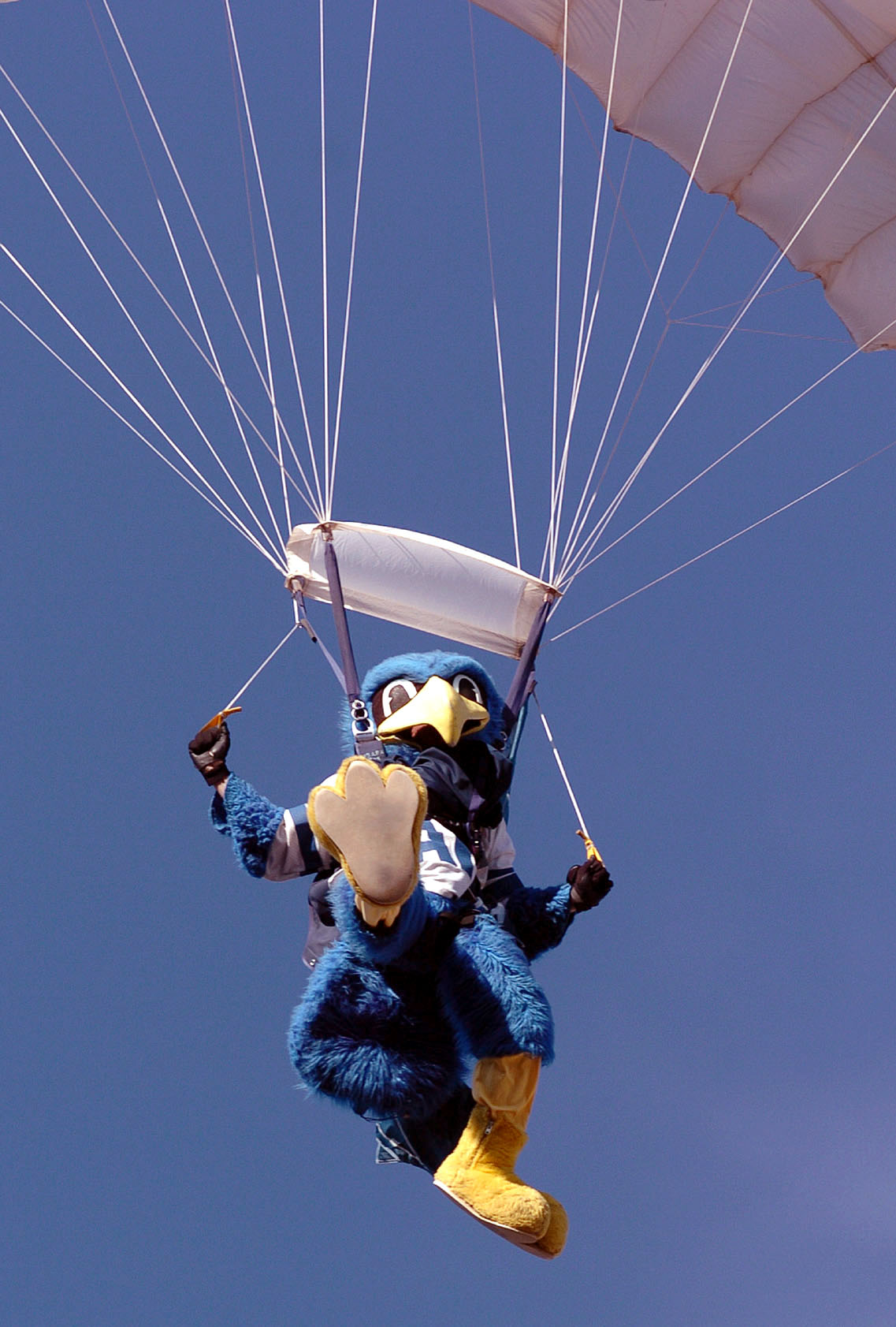
United States Air Force Academy mascot

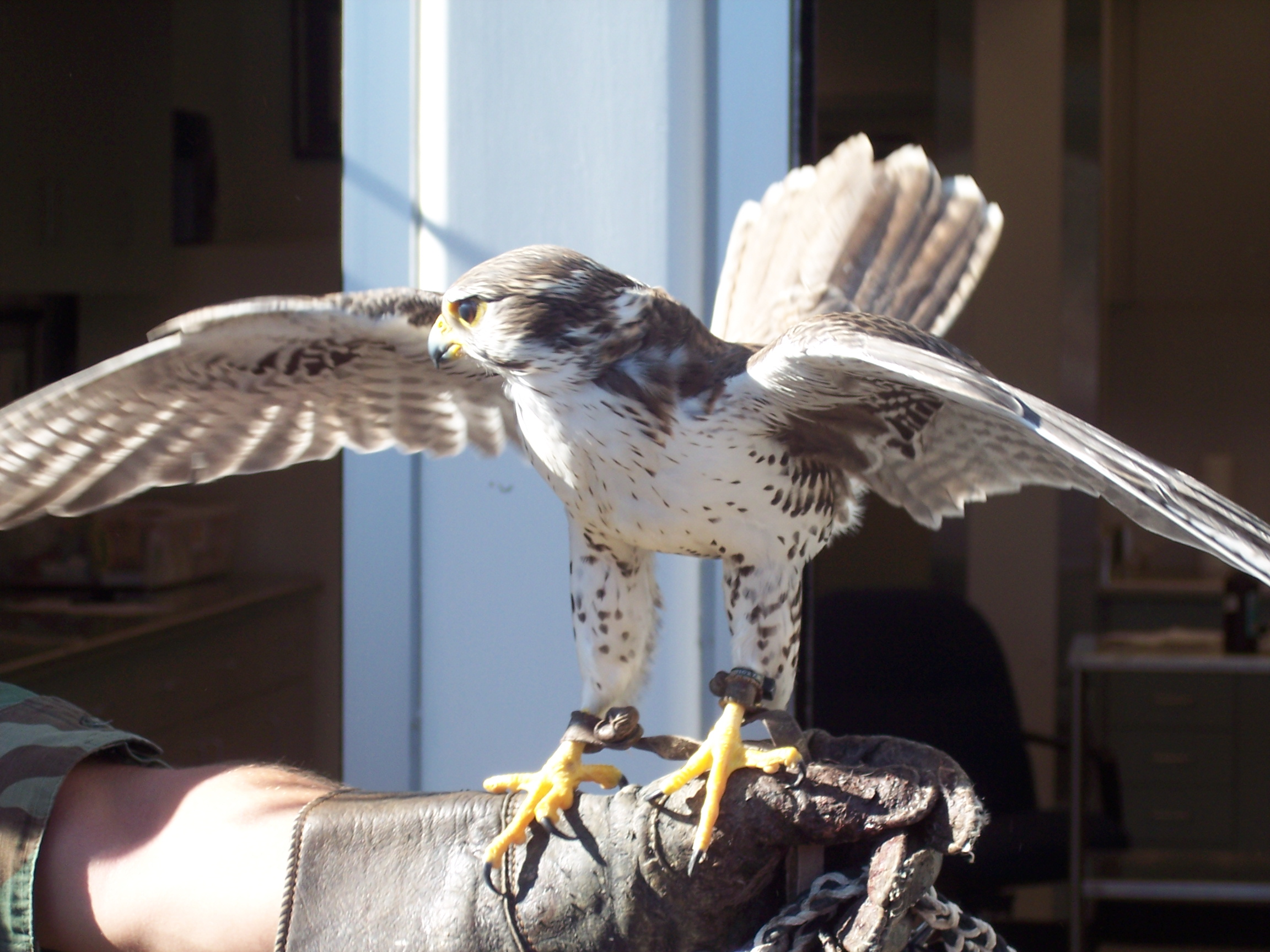
Echo, one of USAFA's trained prairie falcon mascots

All cadets at the academy take part in the school's extensive athletic program. The program is designed to enhance the physical conditioning of all cadets, to develop the physical skills necessary for officership, to teach leadership in a competitive environment and to build character. The primary elements of the athletic program are intercollegiate athletics, intramural athletics, physical education, and the physical fitness tests.

=== Physical education ===
Cadets are required to take physical education courses in each of their four years at the academy, with emphasis on classes and sports that will prepare them to become military officers. All fourth-class cadets are required to take boxing and Physical Development. All third-class cadets are required to take Swimming, Water Survival, and an individual sport elective such as tennis, racquetball, golf, or indoor rock climbing. Second-class cadets are required to take Combatives I & II (unarmed combat) and a team sports elective such as volleyball, basketball, softball, or soccer. First-class cadets are required to take two open elective courses such as Introduction to Combatives, Functional Fitness, additional team or individual sport electives, independent exercise (C1C/C2C cadets only), or cadet instructor (C1C/C2C cadets only). Cadets participating in inter-collegiate sports typically have a modified course schedule for completing their required physical education courses.

=== Physical fitness tests ===
Each semester, cadets must pass two athletic fitness tests, the AFT and PFT: a 1.5 mi (2.4 km) run to measure aerobic fitness, and a 15-minute, 5-event, physical fitness test consisting of pull-ups, a standing long jump, sit-ups, push-ups and a 600 yd (550 m) sprint. Failure to pass a fitness test usually results in the cadet being assigned to a reconditioning course until they can pass the test. Repeated failures can lead to disenrollment by the Physical Education Review Committee.

=== Intramural athletics ===
All cadets are required to compete in intramural athletics for their entire time at the academy, unless they are on-season for intercollegiate athletics. Intramural sports pit cadet squadrons against one another in many sports, including basketball, cross-country, flag football, ice hockey, racquetball, flickerball, rugby union, boxing, soccer, mountain biking, softball, team handball, tennis, Ultimate, wallyball and volleyball. Winning the Wing Championship in a given sport is a particular source of pride for a cadet squadron.

=== Intercollegiate athletics ===
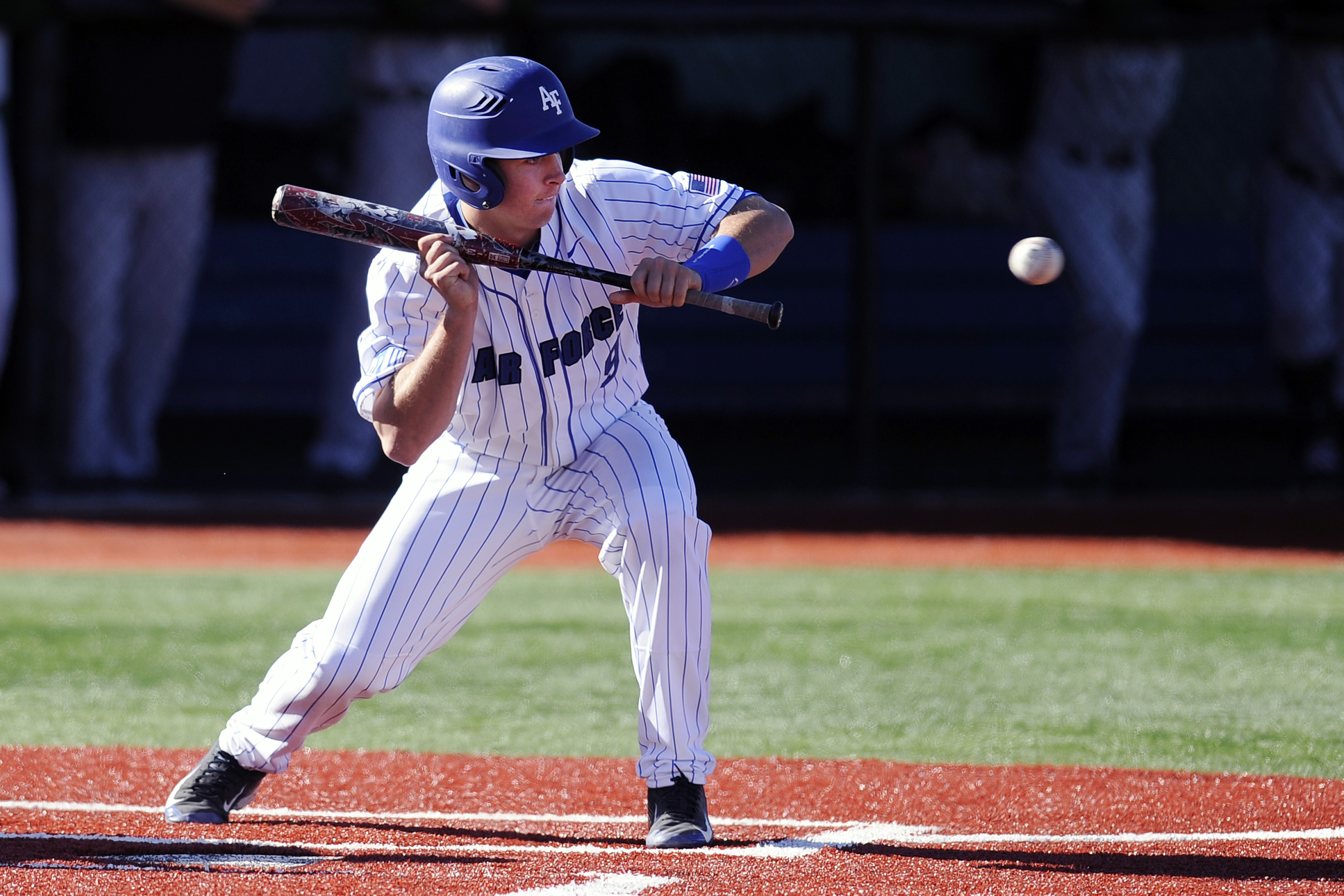
An Air Force Falcons baseball player attempts a bunt during a 2015 game

The academy's intercollegiate program has 17 men's and 10 women's NCAA sanctioned teams, nicknamed the Falcons. Men's teams compete in football, baseball, basketball, ice hockey, cross-country, fencing, golf, gymnastics, indoor and outdoor track, lacrosse, soccer, swimming and diving, tennis, water polo and wrestling. In 1991 the wrestling team won the WAC championship, which was the first ever by any USAFA sports team. Women's teams include basketball, cross-country, fencing, gymnastics, indoor and outdoor track, swimming and diving, soccer, tennis and volleyball. The academy fields a coeducational team in rifle. In addition, the academy also sponsors two non-NCAA programs: cheerleading and boxing. The academy also has several club sports, such as rugby, that compete at an intercollegiate level outside of the NCAA.

The men's and women's programs compete in NCAA's Division I, with the football team competing in Division I FBS. Most teams are in the Mountain West Conference; however, the wrestling team competes in the Big 12 Conference, the men's gymnastics and coeducational fencing teams compete in the Mountain Pacific Sports Federation; the men's soccer team competed in the Western Athletic Conference through the 2025 fall season but joined the newly formed Mountain West conference for the 2026 season; the men's hockey team competes in Atlantic Hockey America, the water polo team competes in the West Coast Conference, the coeducational rifle team competes in the Patriot Rifle Conference, and the men's lacrosse team competes in the Atlantic Sun Conference. The men's boxing team competes in the National Collegiate Boxing Association. For a number of years, only the men's teams competed in Division I. Women's teams competed in Division II and were once members of the Continental Divide Conference, then the Colorado Athletic Conference. With new NCAA legislation, beginning in 1996, women's teams started competing in Division I.

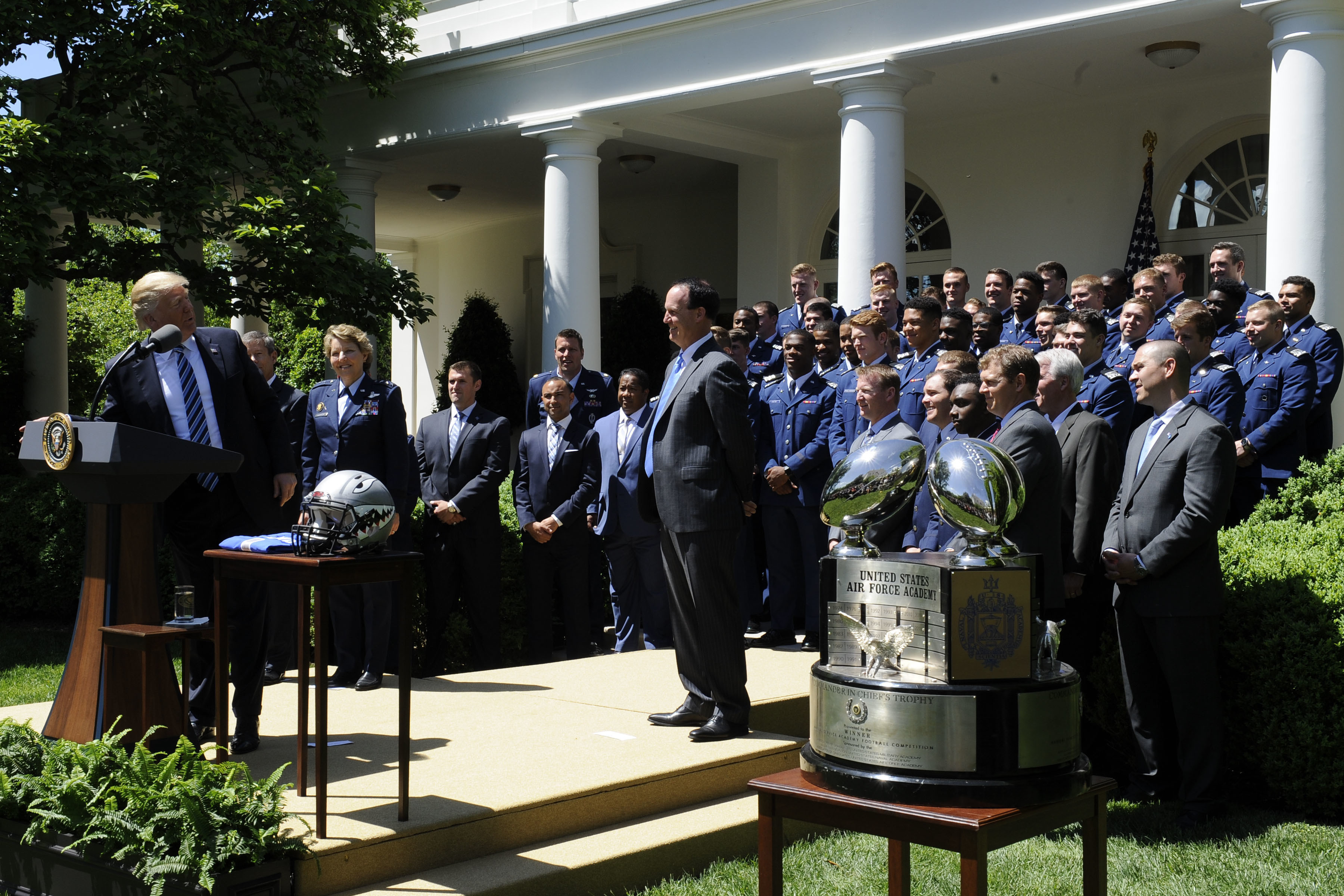
Presentation of the Commander in Chief's Trophy to the Air Force Falcons, 2 May 2017

Air Force has traditional service academy rivalries with Navy and Army. The three service academies compete for the Commander-in-Chief's Trophy in football each year. Air Force Falcons football has had the best showing of the three, winning the trophy 18 of its 34 years. The academy also has an in-state rivalry with Colorado State Rams football, which is located in Fort Collins and is a fellow member of the Mountain West Conference.

The boxing team, led for 31 years by Coach Ed Weichers, has won 18 national championships. The Academy's men's and women's rugby teams have each won multiple national championships and the women's side recently had two players selected for the United States national team. The football team has played in 17 bowl games and the basketball team has had strong showings in the last several years, qualifying for the NCAA tournament and, most recently, making the final four of the 2007 NIT Tournament. The men's ice hockey team won the last two Atlantic Hockey conference tournaments, made the first ever appearance by a service academy in the NCAA hockey tournament in 2007, and made a repeat appearance in 2008. The Air Force Academy's Men's Hockey team recently lost in the "Elite Eight" of hockey in double overtime. This marked the farthest they had gone in the post-season in school history and the longest an Atlantic Hockey Association team has made it into the post-season.

The track and field team has had national and international success. Three women won Division II NCAA titles before the women's team moved to Division I competition: Gail Conway (outdoor 400 meters in 1983, outdoor 800 meters in 1984); Jill Wood (indoor 1500 meters in 1988); and Callie Calhoun (indoor and outdoor 3000 meters and outdoor 5000 meters in 1990, indoor 3000 meters and outdoor 10,000 meters in 1991). Three athletes have also won Division I NCAA outdoor titles: Jim Murphy in the 5000 meters in 1964, Dana Pounds in the javelin in 2005 and 2006, and Mahala Norris in the steeplechase in 2021. 1983 alumnus Alonzo Babers won gold medals in the 400 meters and the 4x400 meter relay at the 1984 Los Angeles Olympic Games.

In 2014, Academy Superintendent Lt. Gen. Michelle Johnson responded to reports of allegations of sexual assault and drug use at a December 2011 party by calling for a review of the athletic department by the inspector general.

== Airmanship ==
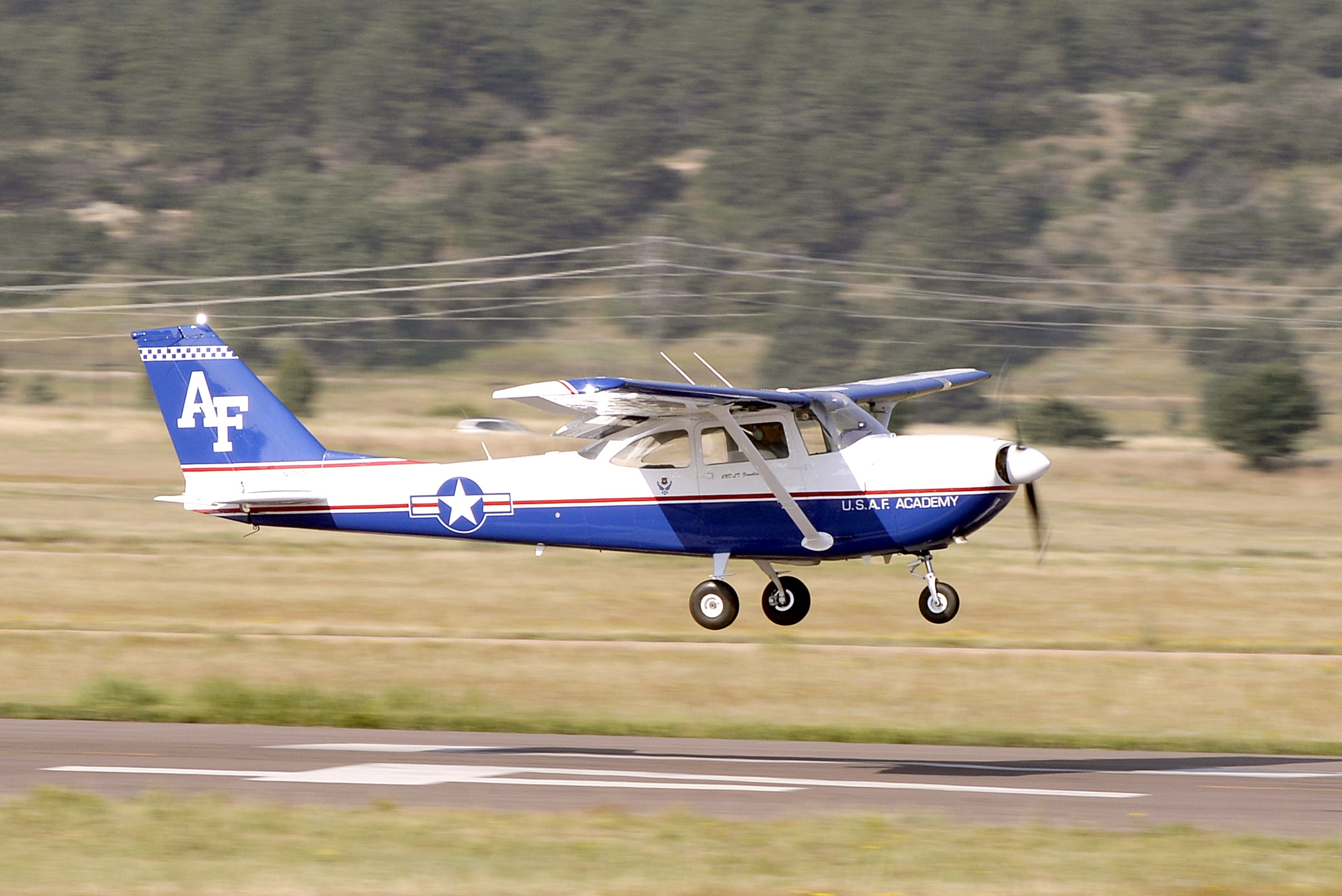
Cessna T-41D of the 557th Flying Training Squadron

Cadets have the opportunity to take part in several airmanship activities to include soaring, parachuting, and powered flight. Airmanship activities at the academy are primarily conducted by the 306th Flying Training Group.

The 94th Flying Training Squadron trains cadets in basic airmanship principles through several flights in TG-16A sailplanes. Each year, several soaring students are selected to become instructor pilots to teach new classes of soaring students. Some of these cadet instructor pilots also compete on the Soaring Racing Team or Acrobatics Team in national competitions.

Cadets also have the opportunity to take a parachuting course conducted by the 98th Flying Training Squadron. Each year, hundreds of cadets earn their Basic Parachutist Badge by completing five jumps in the program. A number of cadets are selected for further training and become members of The Wings of Blue, the U.S. Air Force Parachute Team.

A powered flight program is conducted under the 557th Flying Training Squadron to expose cadets to the basics of powered flight. The program uses T-53A aircraft to offer cadets basic flight training and the opportunity to solo. The U.S. Air Force Academy Flying Team is composed of ~26 cadets selected to compete in National Intercollegiate Flying Association competitions. The Flying Team uses T-41D and T-51A aircraft to compete in precision landing, navigation, and message drop events.

== Admissions ==
Undergraduate demographics as of 22 November 2024
Race and ethnicity	Total
White	63%
Hispanic	12%
Other (Note: Other consists of Multiracial Americans & those who prefer to not say.)	9%
Asian	7%
Black	6%
Foreign national	1%
Economic diversity
Data Not Available

To be eligible to enter the academy, a candidate must:

- Be a citizen of the United States (unless nominated by an official of a country invited by the Department of Defense)
- Be unmarried with no dependents
- Be of good moral character
- Be at least 17, but less than 23 years of age by 1 July of the year of entry
- Meet high leadership, academic, physical and medical standards

In addition to the normal application process, all candidates must secure a nomination to the academy, normally from a U.S. Senator or U.S. Representative. Each member of Congress and the vice president can have five appointees attending the Air Force Academy at any time. The process for obtaining a congressional nomination is not political and candidates do not have to know their senator or representative to secure a nomination. Additional nomination slots are available for children of career military personnel, children of disabled veterans or veterans who were killed in action, or children of Medal of Honor recipients. The admissions process is a lengthy one and applicants usually begin the paperwork during their junior year of high school.

=== Class size ===
There were 306 cadets admitted for the first class (class of 1959). By 1961, class size was down to 271, but due to the need for officers in the Vietnam War, grew to 745 admittees in 1970, and peaking in 1974, with 1,620, and 1975, with 1,626, the largest number ever admitted. After that class sizes shrank down to about 1,300 before spiking to 1,485 in 1988 (class of 1992). Despite a peak of 1,350 (admitted 2004) and 1,418 (admitted 2005), from 1995 to 2005 class size averaged about 1,250 freshmen. From 2005 to 2010 class sizes were slightly down from the 2005 peak. The 2013 class (beginning 2009) had 1,286 and the 2014 class (beginning Fall 2010) had 1,285. Cutbacks were ordered in 2011, so by 2012, the entering class (class of 2016) was down to about 1,050. The class 2022 began with 1,286 students, lowered to 1,282 by the end of BCT. The class of 2023 began with 1159, and ended BCT with approximately 1150.

== Traditions ==
=== Nicknames ===
Alumni of the academy are referred to as the Long Blue Line. Cadets and alumni are also known as Zoomies.

Traditional Prop and Wings insignia, currently used at the U.S. Air Force Academy

=== Prop and Wings ===
The Prop and Wings insignia of the Air Service (1918–26), Air Corps (1926–41), and Army Air Forces (1941–47) became the insignia of upperclass cadets at the Air Force Academy beginning with the first class, 1959. The insignia is given to fourth class (freshmen) cadets at the Recognition Ceremony near the end of their first year rite of passage. The standard insignia uses the design of the Air Corps Prop and Wings, except that it is all silver instead of the gold wings and silver prop of the earlier design. Cadets who have ancestors who served in the Air Service, Air Corps, or Army Air Forces, or those who are direct descendants of Air Force Academy graduates, are eligible to wear a different set of props and wings consisting of a silver prop and gold wings.

=== Blue Berets ===
USAF Academy First Class Cadet and BCT Cadre Beret

The USAFA first class (senior year) cadets as well as junior or third year cadets serving as cadre for the first year's Basic Cadet Training summer encampment wear the blue beret with the traditional silver prop and wings when wearing the OCP uniform.

=== Acceptance Parade and Parents' Weekend ===
The Acceptance Parade celebrates the end of Basic Cadet Training (BCT) for incoming fourth-class cadets. At the Parade, fourth-class cadets are awarded their uniform shoulder boards in recognition of completing BCT and being accepted into the Cadet Wing. Fourth-class cadets formally take the USAFA Honor Code Oath. The Legacy class, the class that graduated 50 years prior to the incoming class' graduation, presents a copy of the Contrails book to the outstanding Basic Cadet from each of the ten BCT squadrons.

A few weeks later, over the Labor Day weekend, the Cadet Wing participates in Parents' Weekend. This event marks the first time that fourth-class cadets are able to see their families since Inprocessing Day. After the Cadet Wing Parade, families are invited into the Cadet Wing to attend open houses.

=== Class exemplar ===
During the fall semester of the third-class year, cadets choose a class exemplar who becomes the class' namesake. The exemplar is typically a deceased member of the Air Force, Army Air Force, or Army Air Service, with a few notable exceptions like the Wright Brothers and Neil Armstrong. The tradition began with the Class of 2000. The selection of the class exemplar is celebrated with a formal class-wide dinner.

=== Commitment Dinner ===
Commitment Dinner takes place prior to the first day of classes at the start of the second-class fall semester. By attending the dinner, second-class cadets are formally committing serving in the Air Force or Space Force upon graduation. Up until this point, fourth-class or third-class cadets may withdraw from the academy without incurring any financial or military obligations. After Commitment, cadets leaving the academy may incur financial penalties or be required to serve on active duty in the Air Force or Space Force.

=== Class crest ===
Each class of cadets designs its own class crest; the only requirements being that each crest include all the elements on the Class of 1959's crest: the class number, the class year, the Polaris star, and the eagle. The final crest is unveiled during the Ring Dance when second-degree cadets receive their class rings. During the first-degree year, the crest is on prominent display on the Crest Wall on the Terrazzo.

=== Class ring ===
The American college tradition of the class ring began with the class of 1835 at the U.S. Military Academy. From there, it spread to the U.S. Naval Academy in the class of 1869. The Air Force Academy continued the tradition, beginning with the first class, 1959, and so is the only service academy to have had class rings for every class since its founding. The Air Force ring is distinctive for being white gold instead of the yellow gold used at the other academies. One side of the ring bears the academy crest, while the other side bears the class crest; the center bezel bears the words United States Air Force Academy. Cadets choose their own stones for the center of the ring. The rings are received during their second-degree (junior) year at the Ring Dance, at the beginning of Graduation Week festivities for the class ahead. The rings traditionally are placed in glasses of champagne and are caught in the teeth following a toast. During the cadet's first-degree (senior) year, the ring is worn with the class crest facing the wearer; following graduation, the ring is turned so that the class crest faces out. The rings of all the academies were originally designed to be worn on the left hand, so that the wearer reads the name of the academy on the bezel while a cadet or midshipman and others can read it after graduation, the rings are now worn on either hand. The academy's Association of Graduates (AOG) accepts rings of deceased graduates which are melted down to form an ingot of white gold from which a portion of all future rings are made. Both the academy's Association of Graduates and the academy library maintain displays of class rings.

=== 100’s Night ===
100's Night takes place 100 nights before first-class cadets ("firsties") are set to graduate. It is a formal dinner in celebration of all they have accomplished up to this point in their cadet career and their impending commission as Second Lieutenants in the Air Force or Space Force. After the dinner, Firsties are given leave for the weekend to celebrate. While the Firsties are gone, fourth-class cadets decorate their rooms to celebrate.

=== Music ===
The Drum and Bugle Corps at Falcon Stadium prior to the start of the 2012 football season opener against Idaho State

The United States Air Force Academy Band provides all ceremonial and musical support for the cadet wing of the academy. It is an active duty band that is composed of full-time musicians, not USAFA cadets. Established in 1948 in Washington, D.C., the United States Air Force Academy Drum and Bugle Corps on the other hand is staffed by cadets of the academy and provides support for all academy events such as football and basketball games. It served the entire Air Force from the capital until its reassignment to the academy in 1963 and the cadet wing in 1972.

The two bands wear different uniforms when performing, with the academy band performing in a specialized full dress uniform while the drum and bugle corps march in standard cadet uniforms.

== Controversies ==
=== Honor scandals ===
The first honor scandal broke in 1965, when a resigning cadet reported knowing of more than 100 cadets who had been involved in a cheating ring. 109 cadets were ultimately expelled. Cheating scandals plagued the academy again in 1967, 1972, 1984, 2004, 2007, 2012, 2014, 2019, 2020, and 2025.

In April 2022, 22 cadets were permanently expelled from the academy due to a May 2020 final exams cheating scandal in which 245 cadets were investigated.

=== Allegations of sexual harassment, assault and gender bias ===
The sexual assault scandal that broke in 2003 forced the academy to look more closely at how effectively women had been integrated into cadet life; concerns with sexual assault, hazing of male cadets, and the disciplinary process during this period were detailed in a 2010 book by a former cadet. Following the scandal and rising concerns about sexual assault throughout the U.S. military, the Department of Defense established a task force to investigate sexual harassment and assault at each of the United States service academies. The report also revealed 92 incidents of reported sexual assault. At the same time, the academy implemented programs to combat sexual assault, harassment and gender bias. The new programs actively encourage prompt sexual assault reporting. The academy's decisive actions of zero tolerance were praised by officials and experts.

Following the 2003 crisis, the Department of Defense directed its attention to the problem of sexual harassment and assault at the military academies. The Department of Defense claimed that the program was successful although during the school year 2010–11 there were increased reports of sexual assault at the academy; however, one goal of the program is increased reporting. There have been several attempts to prosecute cadets for rape since 2003, but only three have resulted in convictions, citing the confidential informant program that ran from 2011 to 2012. The informant program was led by former AFOSI agent Brandon Enos, AFOSI's most successful agent in Air Force Academy's history in combating sexual assault and drug use among cadets. After the confidential informant program was mysteriously disbanded in 2013 on orders from General Johnson, sexual assault reporting fell by half. On 5 January 2012 rape charges were referred against cadets in three unrelated cases. To help combat these problems, the United States Air Force Office of Special Investigations (AFOSI) created a system of cadet informants to hunt for misconduct among students. According to The New York Times in academic year 2014, "after the informant program ended with no further convictions, reports fell by half."

The New York Times cited a letter to Congress from former AFOSI Agent, Staff Sergeant Brandon Enos, who said that Lieutenant General Michael C. Gould, the superintendent from 2009 to 2013 and a former quarterback on the team, had repeatedly interfered in cases involving football players. In turn Gould said to the Times that the suggestion that he had interfered with the investigation "preposterous." Gould was found guilty by a report from the Pentagon in June 2016 of interfering with AFOSI investigations from 2011 to 2012, including blocking an investigation into the football coaches. Gould was subsequently removed from the College Football Selection Committee.

These and other problems again rose to national prominence in the summer of 2014 when The Gazette broke an investigation into behavior by Academy cadets and faculty that included allegations of drug use, alcohol abuse, cheating, and sexual assault. This behavior, described as "so wild that AFOSI leaders canceled a planned 2012 sting out of concern that undercover agents and confidential informants at a party wouldn't be enough to protect women from rape," prompted the academy superintendent to call for an investigation of the academy's athletic department.

A 2023 survey found 22% of female cadets and 4% of male cadets had experienced unwanted sexual contact, ranging from touching to rape.

=== Religious atmosphere ===
In 2005, allegations surfaced that some evangelical Christian cadets and staff were effectively engaging in religious proselytizing at the academy. These allegations, along with concerns over how the Air Force handles other religious issues, prompted Academy graduate Michael L. Weinstein to file a lawsuit against the Air Force. An Air Force panel investigated the accusations and issued a report on 22 June 2005. The panel's investigation found a "religious climate that does not involve overt religious discrimination, but a failure to fully accommodate all members' needs and a lack of awareness over where the line is drawn between permissible and impermissible expression of beliefs." Evidence discovered during the investigation included antisemitic remarks, official sponsorship of a showing of the film The Passion of the Christ and a locker room banner that said academy athletes played for "Team Jesus." In response to the panel's findings, the Air Force released new guidelines to discourage public prayers at official events or meetings and to facilitate worship by non-Christian religions.

In 2010 the academy set up an outdoor worship area for cadets following Wicca, Neo-Druidism, or other earth-based religions to practice their faiths. A survey conducted that same year found that 41 percent of academy cadets who identified themselves as non-Christian reported they were subjected to unwanted religious proselytizing at least once or twice last year at the school. The survey's results, however, showed that the number of cadets who felt pressured to join in religious activities had declined from previous years. Colorado congressman Mike Coffman criticized the academy for resisting calls to release details of the survey's results. Two years later, 66 House Republicans complained about policies set in place the last September to curtail requirements to attend religious events.

=== Hazing incidents ===
Beginning in 2012, the Air Force Academy began to receive sustained, negative attention for unofficial hazing rituals carried out by cadets. Following the 2014 investigation into hazing, alcohol abuse, and cheating on the academy's football team, further investigations in 2017 and 2018 into other teams in the athletic department uncovered similar behavior on the academy's men's lacrosse and men's swimming teams. In addition to suspending the coaching staff of the lacrosse team, senior cadets on both the lacrosse and swimming teams have had their graduation and commissioning delayed, and potentially revoked, as the Air Force proceeds with its internal investigations. In an April 2018 statement made on the hazing scandal to the Board of Visitors, which reports its findings to the Pentagon and Congress, Academy Superintendent Lt. Gen. Jay Silveria stated, "Times have changed, and some of these rituals hang on that are completely, ridiculously inappropriate."

== See also ==
- United States service academies
  - United States Air Force Academy (USAFA)
  - United States Coast Guard Academy (USCGA)
  - United States Merchant Marine Academy (USMMA)
  - United States Military Academy (USMA; Army)
  - United States Naval Academy (USNA)
- List of colleges and universities in Colorado
- Air Force Academy, Colorado
- Jabara Award
- KAFA-FM radio

== Additional sources ==
- Bruegmann, Robert. Modernism at Mid-Century: The Architecture of the United States Air Force Academy. University of Chicago Press: 1995. ISBN 0-226-07693-8.
- Celebrating the U.S. Air Force Academy's Golden Anniversary, (Colorado Springs) Gazette, Special Edition, Spring 2004.
- Contrails (various years)
- Fagan, George V. Air Force Academy: An Illustrated History. Johnson Books: 1988. ISBN 1-55566-032-0.
- Fifty Years of Excellence: Building Leaders of Character for the Nation, 2004.
- Lui, Elizabeth Gill. Spirit and Flight: A Photographic Salute to the United States Air Force Academy. 1996. ISBN 0-9652585-0-5.
- Nauman, Robert Allen. (2004). On the Wings of Modernism: the United States Air Force Academy. Urbana: University of Illinois Press. ISBN 978-0-252-02891-5; OCLC 52542599
- Pendlebury, J. (2018). "This Is a Man's Job": Challenging the Masculine "Warrior Culture" at the U.S. Air Force Academy. Armed Forces & Society. "This Is a Man’s Job": Challenging the Masculine "Warrior Culture" at the U.S. Air Force Academy
- Schemo, Diana Jean. Skies to Conquer: A Year Inside the Air Force Academy. John Wiley & Sons, Inc.: 2010.
- Schifani, Katherine L. "Bring Me Men: Intertextual Identity Formation at the US Air Force Academy." (Masters Theses, U of Massachusetts-Amherst, 2008): online free
