= Air Training Officer =

Former position at the United States Air Force Academy

Air Training Officers (ATO) were specially selected commissioned officers who served as surrogate upperclass cadets at the United States Air Force Academy.

== Establishment of the Air Force Academy ==
the history of flight training by the predecessor organizations of the United States Air Force. The U.S. Army purchased its first airplane, built and successfully flown by Orville and Wilbur Wright, in 1909, and placed both lighter- and heavier-than-air aeronautics in the Division of Military Aeronautics of the Signal Corps. The original Air Training Officers were commissioned junior officers who served as a surrogate upperclass for incoming cadets before there were actual upperclass cadets to conduct training and oversee the Cadet Wing.

== Admission of Women to the Academy ==
In 1976, the ATO program was revived in a modified form when women were allowed to attend the Air Force Academy. The academy brought in a number of female junior officers to learn about Academy life and act as surrogate upperclassmen specifically for the new female cadets.

Before taking on their roles, the new ATOs underwent Survival, Evasion, Resistance and Escape (SERE) training, physical conditioning, various airmanship programs, field training at Jacks Valley and audited academic courses. Special counseling courses enabled the ATOs to help women cadets with potential personal problems.

== Notes ==
1. Cameron 1999, p. iii.
