= 557th Flying Training Squadron =

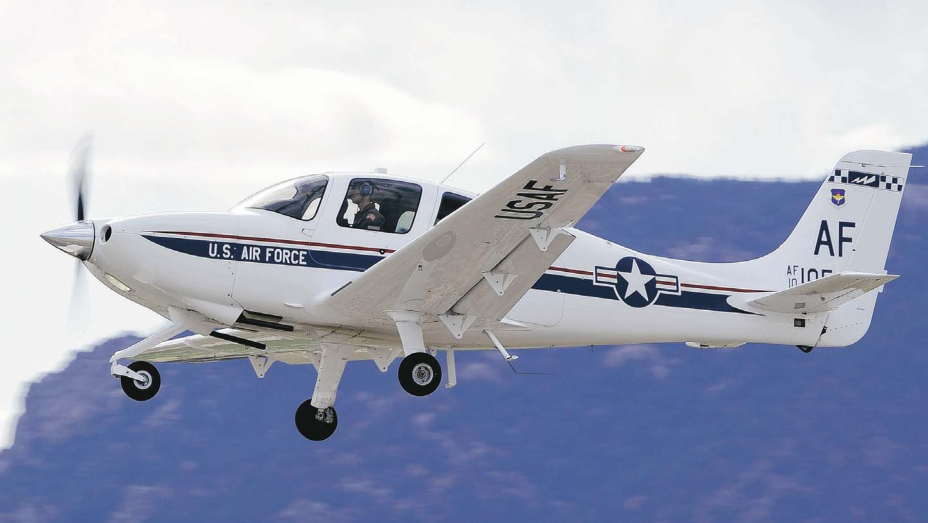
- A Cirrus T-53 of the 557th taking off
- Active: 1942–1945; 1962–1970; 1974–present
- Country: United States
- Branch: United States Air Force
- Role: Flying Training
- Part of: Air Education and Training Command
- Garrison/HQ: United States Air Force Academy
- Engagements: European Theater of Operations; Vietnam War
- Decorations: Distinguished Unit Citation; Air Force Outstanding Unit Award with Combat "V" Device; Air Force Outstanding Unit Award; Republic of Vietnam Gallantry Cross with Palm

Commanders
- Current commander: Lt Col Jonathan Clason

Insignia
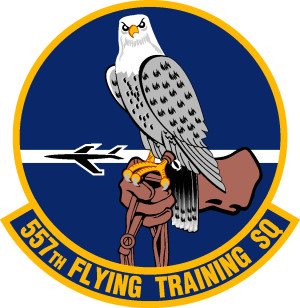
- 557th Flying Training Squadron emblem (Note: Approved 8 September 1975.)

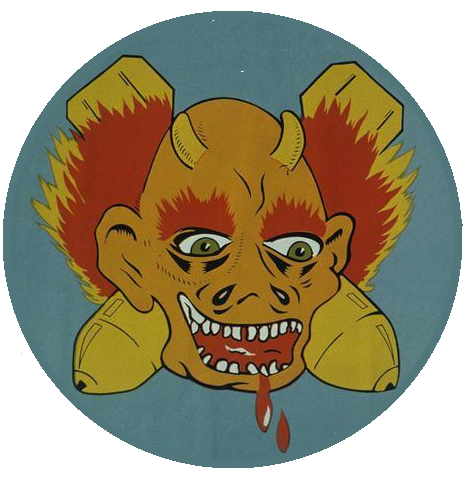
- 557th Bombardment Squadron emblem (Note: Approved 19 April 1943. Description: On a light blue disc, the head of a fiend, face leathery, fangs bared, eyes green, eyebrows enflamed, horns issuing from forehead, mouth dripping blood proper; in front of two yellow aerial bombs in saltire, enflamed at the center.)

The 557th Flying Training Squadron is part of the 306th Flying Training Group based at United States Air Force Academy, Colorado, where it has conducted flight training for Academy cadets since 1974.

The first predecessor of the squadron was the 557th Bombardment Squadron, a Martin B-26 Marauder unit, which flew combat in the European Theater of Operations, earning a Distinguished Unit Citation in December 1944. It was inactivated after the end of World War II.

The squadron's second predecessor is the 557th Tactical Fighter Squadron, which was organized in 1962, and flew in combat in the Vietnam War from 1965 to 1970, earning five Air Force Outstanding Unit Awards with Combat "V" Device. The two squadrons were consolidated into a single unit in September 1985.

== Mission ==
The squadron conducts powered flight training for Air Force Academy cadets.

== History ==
=== World War II ===
The first predecessor of the squadron, the 557th Bombardment Squadron, was activated at MacDill Field, Florida on 1 December 1942 as one of the four squadrons of the 387th Bombardment Group and trained at bases in the southeastern United States with Martin B-26 Marauder medium bombers until June 1943, when it deployed to the European Theater of Operations. The squadron's ground echelon departed for the port of embarkation on 10 June and sailed on the RMS Queen Mary on 23 June, while the air echelon ferried its Marauders to England via the northern ferrying route.

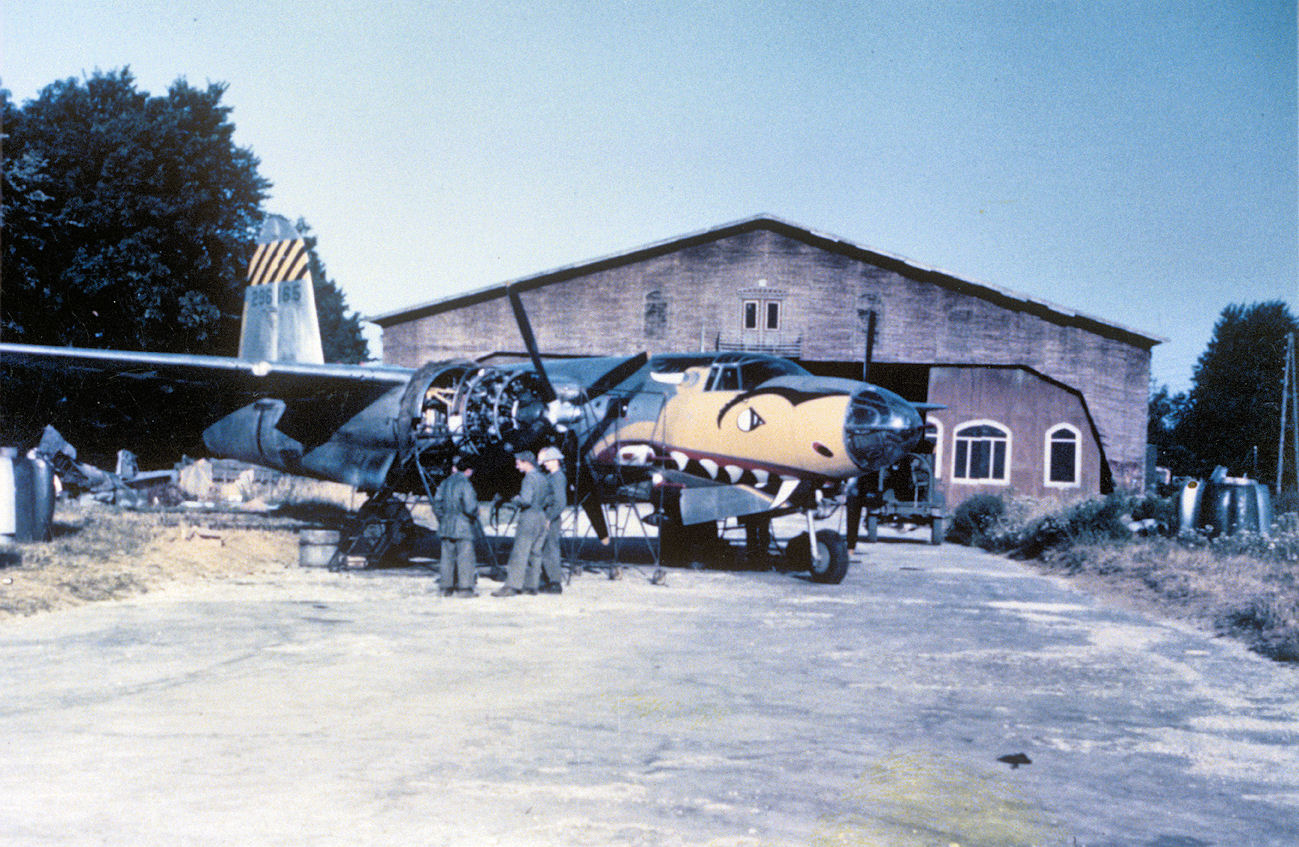
387th Bombardment Group B-26 Marauder (Note: Aircraft is Martin B-26B-55-MA Marauder, serial 42-96165, The Big Hairy Bird.)

The squadron established itself at its first base in Europe, RAF Chipping Ongar at the beginning of July 1943. Although the squadron initially trained for low level attacks, VIII Air Support Command, in consultation with the Royal Air Force, decided to employ its B-26 units in attacks at medium altitude, mirroring a decision made earlier in the Mediterranean Theater of Operations. The squadron flew its first combat mission on 15 August, with initial operations focusing on German airfields near the coast of France, in an effort to force the Luftwaffe to withdraw its interceptors from the coastal belt, reducing their effectiveness against heavy bombers passing through on their way to strike targets deeper in occupied Europe. By early September, the squadron adopted a tactic first employed by the 386th Bombardment Group, where all bombers in a formation dropped their bombs based on the lead aircraft, rather than individually, to achieve a greater concentration of bombs on the intended target. September 1943 would prove the busiest while the squadron was part of Eighth Air Force as B-26s made heavy attacks on airfields and communications sites near Boulogne as part of Operation Starkey, an attempt to make the Germans believe an invasion of France was imminent. On 9 October 1943, the squadron flew what would prove to be the last B-26 mission flown by Eighth Air Force.

In October, Ninth Air Force moved to England to take over tactical operations operating from England, building on the core of B-26 units already there. During the winter of 1943-1944, the squadron made numerous attacks on V-1 flying bomb and V-2 rocket sites. During Big Week, the squadron attacked Leeuwarden and Venlo Airfields. In the spring of 1944, the squadron attacked coastal defenses and bridges prior to Operation Overlord, the invasion of Normandy. On D-Day, it attacked targets along the coast, and supported ground forces during June 1944 by attacking line of communication targets and fuel dumps. In late July, the squadron supported Operation Cobra, the breakout at Saint Lo. During August, it attacked German forces at Brest, France.

The squadron moved to France in September, when it began operations from Maupertuis Airfield. For the rest of the war, it operated from Advanced Landing Grounds in Europe; advancing eastward with Allied ground forces. Is operations from advanced fields permitted its first attacks directly on targets in Germany by the fall of 1944. During the Battle of the Bulge, it attacked strongly defended communications and transportation targets at Mayen and Pruem, for which it was awarded a Distinguished Unit Citation. It continued to support the Allied advance into Germany, flying its last combat mission in April 1945.

After V-E Day the squadron moved to Rosieres-en-Santerre Airfield, France, where it remained until returning to the United States for inactivation in November 1945.

=== Vietnam War ===
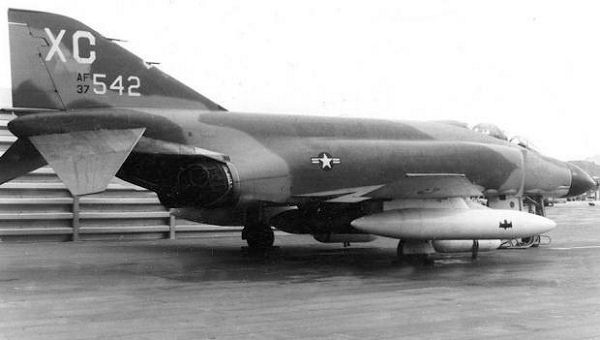
F-4C Phantom of the 557th Tactical Fighter Squadron (Note: Aircraft is McDonnell F-4C-19-MC Phantom II, serial 63-7542. This aircraft survived the war and was transferred to the Arkansas Air National Guard in 1980. It was retired to Aerospace Maintenance and Regeneration Center on 12 July 1988 and salvaged on 13 February 1997. Baugher, Joe (21 April 2023). "1963 USAF Serial Numbers". Joe Baugher.)

The second predecessor of the squadron was the 557th Tactical Fighter Squadron, which was activated at MacDill Air Force Base, Florida in April 1962 as part of the 12th Tactical Fighter Wing, the initial McDonnell F-4 Phantom II fighter unit in the Air Force. The F-4Cs designed for the Air Force were not yet in production at that time. In order to get the squadron operational, second-line Republic F-84F Thunderstreaks were transferred from the Air National Guard. The squadron received Navy F-4Bs for training and then F-4Cs in January 1964.

The 12th Wing deployed to Vietnam in November 1965, and the squadron was briefly assigned to the 836th Air Division, until it rejoined its parent wing at Cam Ranh Bay Air Base, South Vietnam in December. The squadron flew close air support, interdiction, rescue combat patrol, MiG Cap, and other missions. In March 1970, fighter operations at Cam Rahn Bay ended and the 12th Wing turned the base over to the 483d Tactical Airlift Wing. Wing headquarters moved to Phu Cat Air Base on 31 March, replacing the 37th Tactical Fighter Wing, while the 557th and the wing's other fighter squadrons were inactivated.

=== Flying training ===
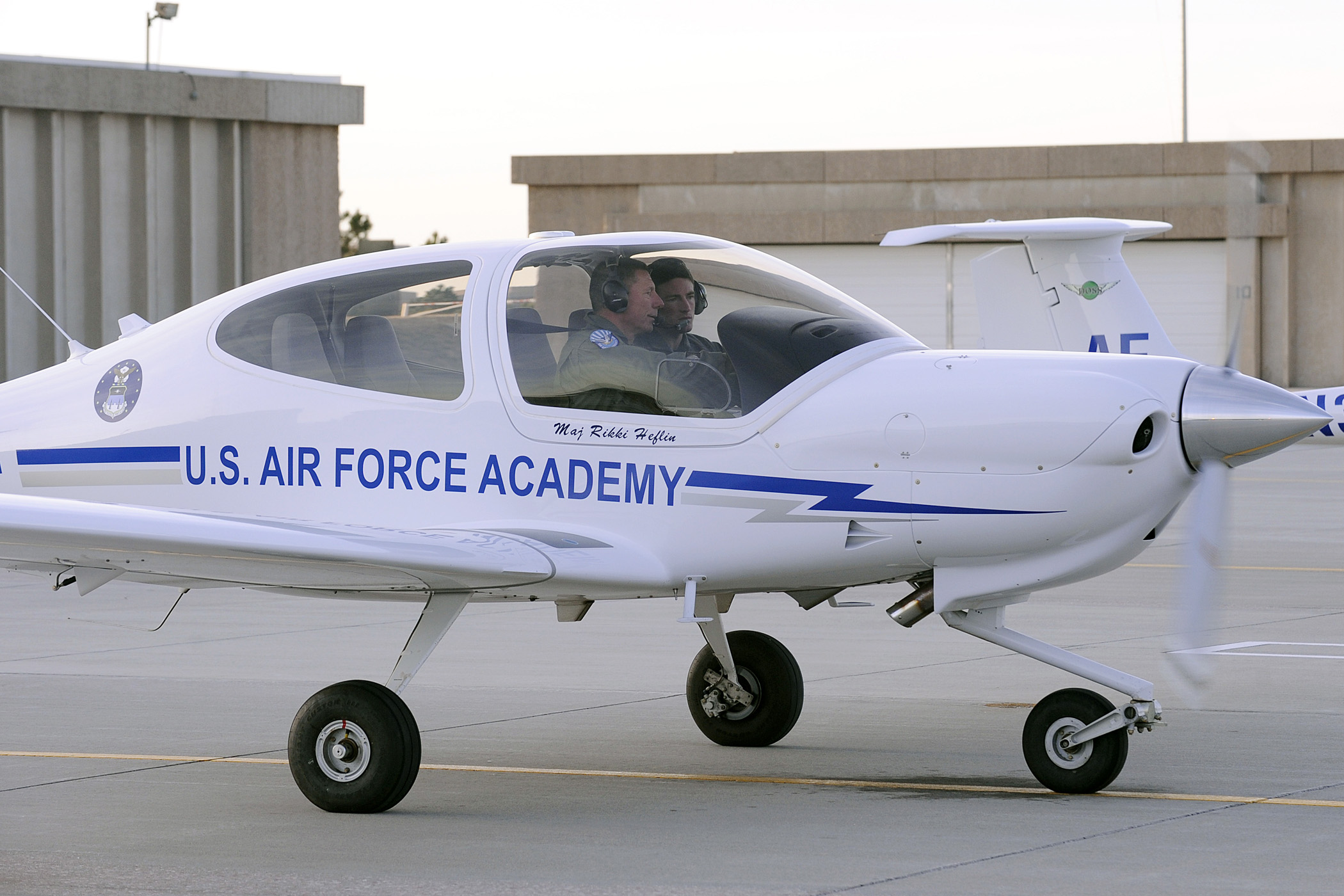
A Diamond T-52A of the 557th at the USAF Academy taxis for a training flight

The squadron was reactivated at the United States Air Force Academy (USAFA) on 31 July 1974 as the 557th Flying Training Squadron to provide basic flight training for USAFA cadets. The squadron was initially equipped with the Cessna T-41 Mescalero. Although the Mescalero, a military version of the Cessna 172, had served since 1968 as a screening aircraft for pilot training candidates, the high altitude of the Academy required models equipped with a more powerful 210 hp Continental engine. Although it was supplanted in this mission in 1995 by the Slingsby T-3 Firefly, the four remaining T-41Ds support flying team operations and are used as an aerodynamics course laboratory. In September 1985, the squadron was consolidated with the World War II bomber squadron.

In addition to providing cadets with some initial flight instruction, the 557th is also home to the USAFA Flying Team, composed of 27 cadets selected for the team. The squadron began flying its current cadet trainer, the Cirrus T-53 in 2011, and in September of the following year, the first cadet soloed in the T-53.

== Lineage ==
557th Bombardment Squadron

- Constituted as the 557th Bombardment Squadron (Medium) on 25 November 1942

Activated on 1 December 1942
Redesignated 557th Bombardment Squadron, Medium on 9 October 1944
Inactivated on 12 Nov 1945
Consolidated with the 557th Flying Training Squadron as the 557th Flying Training Squadron on 19 September 1985

557th Flying Training Squadron

- Constituted as the 557th Tactical Fighter Squadron and activated on 17 April 1962 (not organized)

Organized on 25 April 1962
Inactivated on 31 March 1970

- Redesignated 557th Flying Training Squadron on 18 June 1974

Activated on 31 July 1974

=== Assignments ===
- 387th Bombardment Group, 1 December 1942 – 12 November 1945
- Tactical Air Command, 17 April 1962 (not organized)
- 12th Tactical Fighter Wing, 25 April 1962 – 31 March 1970
- 836th Air Division, 8 November 1965
- 12th Tactical Fighter Wing, 1 December 1965 – 31 March 1970
- Air Training Command, 31 July 1974
- United States Air Force Academy, 1 October 1982
- 12th Operations Group, 1 July 1993
- 34th Training Group, 1 October 2000
- 306th Flying Training Group, 4 October 2004 – present

=== Stations ===
- MacDill Field, Florida, 1 December 1942
- Drane Field, Florida, 12 April 1943
- Godman Field, Kentucky, 12 May–10 June 1943
- RAF Chipping Ongar (AAF-162), England, 1 July 1943
- RAF Stoney Cross (AAF-452), England, c. 21 July 1944
- Maupertuis Airfield (A-15), France, c. 1 September 1944
- Chateaudun Airfield (A-39), France, c. 18 September 1944
- Clastres Airfield (A-71), France, c. 4 November 1944
- Maastricht Airfield (Y-44), Netherlands, c. 4 May 1945
- Rosieres-en-Santerre Airfield (B-87), France, 30 May–c. November 1945
- Camp Kilmer, New Jersey, 11–12 November 1945
- MacDill Air Force Base, Florida, 25 April 1962 – November 1965
- Cam Ranh Bay Air Base, South Vietnam, c. 14 November 1965 – 31 March 1970 (deployed to Kunsan Air Base, South Korea, 3 February-22 July 1968
- United States Air Force Academy, Colorado, 31 July 1974 – present

=== Aircraft ===
- Martin B-26 Marauder (1943–1945)
- Republic F-84 Thunderjet (1962–1964)
- McDonnell F-4 Phantom II (1964–1970)
- Cessna T-41 Mescalero (1974–Present)
- de Havilland Canada UV-18 Twin Otter (1979–1982)
- Cessna T-51A (1982–present)
- Slingsby T-3A Firefly (1994-1997)
- Diamond DA20 Katana (2002-2007)
- Diamond T-52 (2009–2012)
- Cirrus T-53A (2011-present)

=== Awards and campaigns ===
Award streamer	Award	Dates	Notes
	Presidential Unit Citation	Germany 23 December 1944	557th Bombardment Squadron
	Air Force Outstanding Unit Award with Combat "V" Device	1 December 1965–30 May 1966	557th Tactical Fighter Squadron
	Air Force Outstanding Unit Award with Combat "V" Device	1 June 1966–31 May 1967	557th Tactical Fighter Squadron
	Air Force Outstanding Unit Award with Combat "V" Device	1 June 1967–31 May 1968	557th Tactical Fighter Squadron
	Air Force Outstanding Unit Award with Combat "V" Device	1 June 1968–31 May 1969	557th Tactical Fighter Squadron
	Air Force Outstanding Unit Award with Combat "V" Device	1 June 1969–10 March 1970	557th Tactical Fighter Squadron
	Air Force Outstanding Unit Award	1 January 1979–30 April 1980	557th Flying Training Squadron
	Air Force Outstanding Unit Award	30 March 1981–31 October 1982	557th Flying Training Squadron
	Air Force Outstanding Unit Award	1 January 1983–18 December 1984	557th Flying Training Squadron
	Air Force Outstanding Unit Award	1 January 1987–31 December 1988	557th Flying Training Squadron
	Air Force Outstanding Unit Award	1 July 1991-30 June 1993	557th Flying Training Squadron
	Air Force Outstanding Unit Award	1 July 1993-30 June 1994	557th Flying Training Squadron
	Air Force Outstanding Unit Award	1 September 1994-31 October 1995	557th Flying Training Squadron
	Air Force Outstanding Unit Award	1 November 1995-30 June 1996	557th Flying Training Squadron
	Air Force Outstanding Unit Award	1 July 1996-30 June 1998	557th Flying Training Squadron
	Air Force Outstanding Unit Award	1 July 1998-30 June 2000	557th Flying Training Squadron
	Air Force Outstanding Unit Award	1 July 2005-30 June 2007	557th Flying Training Squadron
	Air Force Outstanding Unit Award	1 July 2007-30 June 2009	557th Flying Training Squadron
	Air Force Outstanding Unit Award	1 July 2009-30 June 2011	557th Flying Training Squadron
	Air Force Outstanding Unit Award	1 July 2011-30 June 2013	557th Flying Training Squadron
	Air Force Outstanding Unit Award	1 July 2012-30 June 2015	557th Flying Training Squadron
	Vietnamese Gallantry Cross with Palm	1 December 1965-10 March 1970	557th Tactical Fighter Squadron

Campaign Streamer	Campaign	Dates	Notes
	Air Offensive, Europe	1 July 1943–5 June 1944	557th Bombardment Squadron
	Normandy	6 June 1944–24 July 1944	557th Bombardment Squadron
	Northern France	25 July 1944–14 September 1944	557th Bombardment Squadron
	Rhineland	15 September 1944–21 March 1945	557th Bombardment Squadron
	Ardennes-Alsace	16 December 1944–25 January 1945	557th Bombardment Squadron
	Central Europe	22 March 1944–21 May 1945	557th Bombardment Squadron
	Vietnam Defensive	November 1965–30 January 1966	557th Tactical Fighter Squadron
	Vietnam Air	31 January 1966–28 June 1966	557th Tactical Fighter Squadron
	Vietnam Air Offensive	29 June 1966–8 March 1967	557th Tactical Fighter Squadron
	Vietnam Air Offensive, Phase II	9 March 1967–31 March 1968	557th Tactical Fighter Squadron
	Vietnam Air/Ground	22 January 1968–7 July 1968	557th Tactical Fighter Squadron
	Vietnam Air Offensive, Phase III	1 April 1968–31 October 1968	557th Tactical Fighter Squadron
	Vietnam Air Offensive, Phase IV	1 November 1968–22 February 1969	557th Tactical Fighter Squadron
	Tet 1969/Counteroffensive	23 February 1969–8 June 1969	557th Tactical Fighter Squadron
	Vietnam Summer-Fall 1969	9 June 1969–31 October 1969	557th Tactical Fighter Squadron
	Vietnam Winter-Spring 1970	3 November 1969–10 March 1970	557th Tactical Fighter Squadron

== See also ==
- List of Martin B-26 Marauder operators
- List of F-4 Phantom II operators
