= Ed Weichers =

American boxing trainer

Eddie Weichers was the head boxing coach at the United States Air Force Academy from 1976 to 2014, and served as an associate professor in the physical education department at the Academy. He led the academy's boxing team to 19 national collegiate boxing championships, making it the most successful collegiate program in the United States.

Originally from New Orleans, Weichers holds a Bachelor of Science degree in health and physical education from West Chester University and a master's degree in arts and sports sciences from the University of Denver. While at West Chester, Coach Weichers left football to take up boxing, and eventually won the 190-pound championship for West Chester University in 1973.

He started his coaching career as an assistant coach at his alma mater and, in 1976, was offered the coaching job at the Air Force Academy. Under Coach Weichers' leadership, the academy produced 258 All-American boxers, 96 individual national champions, and 18 national championship teams. For 27 years, from 1980 to 2007, his teams never finished lower than second in the nation.

Weichers has conducted coaching seminars throughout the world, including clinics in Australia, Guatemala, New Zealand, Jamaica, Tahiti and Grenada. While working as a boxing clinician for the Olympic Solidarity Boxing Program, he was selected to coach the Australian Olympic Boxing team, which competed in the 1984 games in Los Angeles. He also served as trainer and coach for Australia's professional world champions, Jeff Fenech and Jeff Harding. He has served as president and vice-president of the National Collegiate Boxing Association (NCBA).

Coach Weichers retired in 2014, and the Air Force Academy boxing facility was named after him in 2026.
