= Jacks Valley (United States Air Force Academy) =

Training complex in Colorado

Jacks Valley (also written as Jack's Valley) is a 3,300-acre (13 km^{2}) training complex on the grounds of the United States Air Force Academy in Colorado Springs, Colorado. It is used for military field training.

Jacks Valley is used year-round by different military units and some civilian groups. However, its primary use is during the second half of Basic Cadet Training (BCT) each summer. During BCT, the new cadets (or "basic cadets") train in a field encampment environment. The basic cadets march to and from Jacks Valley. While in Jacks Valley, they undergo one of the most physically demanding parts of their training at the Academy.

While at Jacks Valley, basic cadets complete several courses.

- The Obstacle Course
- The Leadership Reaction Course - small groups of basic cadets solve problems and cross obstacles;
- The Confidence Course - basic cadets must overcome high obstacles and particularly challenging obstacles that are not normally completed for time;
- The Assault Course - a physically and mentally strenuous course where basic cadets are put through combat like situations with simulated small arms fire, artillery explosions, and obstacles.
- Chemical, biological, radiological and nuclear defense (CBRNE) - information on CBRNE and tear gas training.
- Tactical Combat Casualty Care (TCCC) - basic first aid.
- Combat Arms Training and Maintenance (CATM) - small arms training.

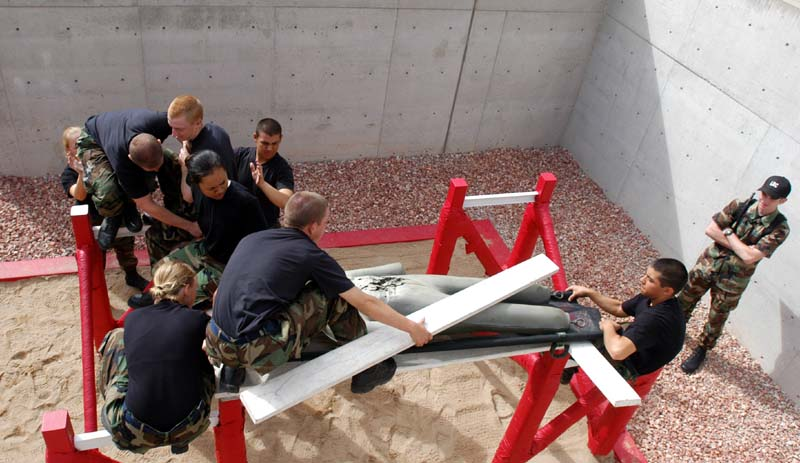
Basic cadets tackle a problem on the Leadership Reaction Course
