= Gruter =

Gruter or Grüter is a surname. It may refer to:

== Gruter ==
- Jan Gruter or Gruytère, Latinized as Janus Gruterus (1560–1627), Flemish-born philologist, scholar, and librarian

== Grüter ==
- Thomas Grüter (born 1966), Swiss footballer
- Franz Grüter (born 1963), Swiss businessman and politician

== See also ==
- Gruters, disambiguation
- Gruter Institute, California-based American institute for Law and Behavioral Research
