= Into the Mouth of the Cat =

Into the Mouth of the Cat: The Story of Lance Sijan, Hero of Vietnam
- First edition
- Author: Malcolm McConnell
- Language: English
- Subject: Biography
- Publisher: W. W. Norton
- Publication date: January 1985
- Publication place: United States
- Media type: Print (Hardcover)
- Pages: 252 pp (first edition)
- ISBN: 0-393-01899-7
- OCLC: 10996920
- Dewey Decimal: 959.704/348 B 19
- LC Class: U53.S55 M33 1985

Into the Mouth of the Cat: The Story of Lance Sijan, Hero of Vietnam is a book written by Malcolm McConnell and copyrighted in 1985 by Norton publishers.

The book is based on the story of Lance Sijan who was a United States Air Force captain in the Vietnam War. On November 9, 1967, Sijan ejected from his F-4 Phantom II at high speed and at a low altitude, which caused him to suffer massive injuries to his body. Upon waking the next morning, Sijan found that his left leg had a vertical splintering of the tibia known as a green tree fracture, his right hand was mangled with three of his fingers dislocated, and he had deep cuts and gashes in his forearms, and a severe head wound.

Sijan avoided and escaped capture for nearly six weeks while crawling through jungles eating nothing but various plants and bugs before he was captured. Even after being captured and going through harsh torture, Sijan escaped once again, only to again be captured. Sijan died two weeks later in a prisoner jail in Hanoi. He was posthumously awarded the Medal of Honor and a dormitory at his alma mater, the United States Air Force Academy, is named in his honor.
