= Gruters =

Gruters or the accented Grüters is a surname. Notable people with the surname include:

== Gruters ==
- Guy Gruters (born 1942), American Air Force officer and fighter pilot
- Joe Gruters (born 1977), American politician and businessman

== Grüters ==
- Hugo Grüters (1851–1928), German conductor

== See also ==
- Gruter (disambiguation)
