= AFCW (disambiguation) =

AFCW may refer to:

== Football clubs ==
- A.F.C. Wallingford
- AFC Wimbledon
- A.F.C. Wulfrunians

== Other uses ==
- A Fish Called Wanda, a film
- United States Air Force Academy Cadet Wing
