= Officer cadet =

Military rank

Officer cadet is a rank held by military personnel during their training to become commissioned officers. In the United Kingdom, the rank is also used by personnel of University Service Units such as the University Officers' Training Corps.

The term officer trainee is used interchangeably in some countries.

== Australia ==
The Australian Defence Force follows the same usage as the British military system, using the rank of officer cadet (for the Australian Army (OCDT) and the Royal Australian Air Force (OFFCDT)), for personnel undergoing initial officer training. Unlike midshipmen in the Royal Australian Navy and officer cadets in the Royal Australian Air Force who hold a commission, officer cadets in the Australian Army do not yet hold a permanent commission, and are not saluted or referred to as "sir" or "ma'am". They do however hold probationary commissions. Officer cadets in the Australian Army are subordinate to warrant officers and officers and address them as "sir" or "ma'am". As officer cadets are appointed to their positions, they are technically superior to some other ranks, although they will typically not have direct subordinates.

Initial officer training can occur through either single-service institutions, such as the Royal Australian Naval College, Royal Military College, Duntroon, or the Officers' Training School RAAF, or through the tri-service Australian Defence Force Academy (ADFA). The ranks of officer cadet, staff cadet, and midshipman are primarily found at these establishments. However, RAAF officer trainees are often appointed to a higher rank while undergoing their initial training course at OTS if they have prior military experience, either as officer cadets prior to their initial officer course, or at airman rank. Officer cadets are also appointed to the Australian Army Reserve where training is conducted on a part-time basis at various University Regiments around the country.

Australian Army Reserve officer cadets must pass various training courses (conducted at different barracks around Australia) throughout their training with the final module completed at the Royal Military College, Duntroon before being commissioned.

At ADFA, upon completion of all academic training through the "UNSW@ADFA", military training and subsequent training at other military establishments, officer cadets from the RAAF are promoted to a higher junior officer rank, while those from the Australian Army spend another year at the Royal Military College, Duntroon before being commissioned.

Pilots, air traffic controllers and air combat officers joining the RAAF directly through the Officers' Training School (without going to ADFA) also start their career as an officer cadet. Once they have completed their employment training (2FTS, SATC and SAW respectively), they are promoted. This will change however, as of May 2018, where all graduates from OTS will graduate with a minimum rank of PLTOFF. This will mean that the OFFCDT rank will be used only during initial military training.

A RAAF OFFCDT Rank Insignia

Australian Army OCDT Rank Insignia

A Royal Australian Navy MIDN Rank Shoulder Insignia

== Canada ==
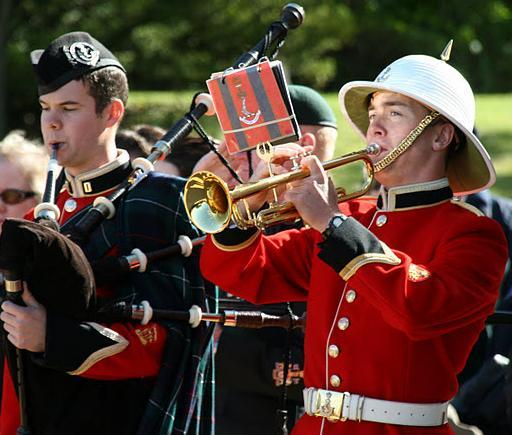
Members of the Royal Military College of Canada Bands. Students attending the college are officer cadets.

In the Canadian Armed Forces, the rank of officer cadet (OCdt), or élève-officier (élof) in French, is held by beginning officers, as well as students attending the Royal Military College of Canada in Kingston, Ontario, the Royal Military College Saint-Jean, Saint-Jean-sur-Richelieu, Quebec, or a civilian university through the Regular Officer Training Plan. Students designated to the navy environment use the equivalent rank, naval cadet (NCdt), or aspirant de marine (aspm) in French, in lieu of officer cadet.

Some officer cadets, who are going through Regular Officer Training Plan, are highly qualified in their military occupation. However, those officers are ineligible to receive a commission until holding a university degree.

Naval cadets and officer cadets in the Canadian Armed Forces are subordinate officers, but generally billet or mess with commissioned officers. They have yet to be granted the King's commission which would make them commissioned officers, and as such are not to be saluted by non-commissioned members.

The rank insignia for naval cadet is a narrow gold braid (6 mm; note difference with standard braid size). This gives rise to the somewhat derogatory term 'quarter-inch admiral'. For officer cadets of the army environment, the rank insignia is one pip on a white band. A narrow pearl grey braid (6 mm) is used by cadets of the air force environment, which is worn on the cuff of the service dress jacket, and on the slip-ons of all other uniforms. Cap insignia are limited to the Canadian Armed Forces brass badge earned through the Basic Military Officer Qualification course, the Royal Military College badge for students enrolled at one of the two colleges, or the appropriate badge representing the personnel branch or regiment for officer cadets with prior service as non-commissioned members.

Naval cadet rank insignia

Army officer cadet rank insignia

Air force officer cadet rank insignia

== France ==
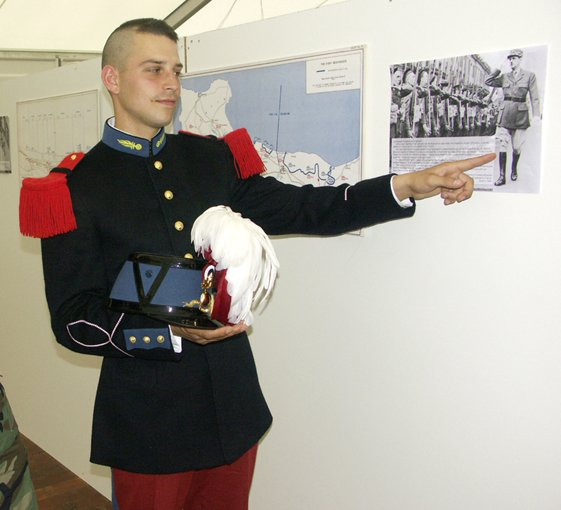
A first year officer cadet of the école spéciale militaire de Saint-Cyr

In the French Armed Forces, the posting, named « élève officier » or 'student officer' in French, is generally given to officers in training in their first months of education. They are eventually promoted to the rank of aspirant or officer candidate. While both positions are quite comparable, aspirant is an actual rank, meaning the officer-in-training can hold effective authority, if ordered, on non-commissioned members of the military.

== Indonesia ==
In the Indonesian service academies (military, naval, air force), there is a ranking system associated to the cadets training and studying in the academy. The length term is 4 years and is divided into 5 grades of the cadet's rank, starting from the lowest:

- Prajurit Taruna/Kadet/Karbol (Cadet Private), 1st year (4 months)
- Kopral Taruna/Kadet/Karbol (Cadet Corporal), 1st year (8 months)
- Sersan Taruna/Kadet/Karbol (Cadet Sergeant), 2nd year
- Sersan Mayor Dua Taruna/Kadet/Karbol (Cadet Second Sergeant Major), 3rd year
- Sersan Mayor Satu Taruna/Kadet/Karbol (Cadet First Sergeant Major), 4th year

Taruna refers to cadets in the military academy, Kadet refers to cadets in the naval academy, and Karbol refers to cadets in the air force academy, respectively.

== Pakistan ==
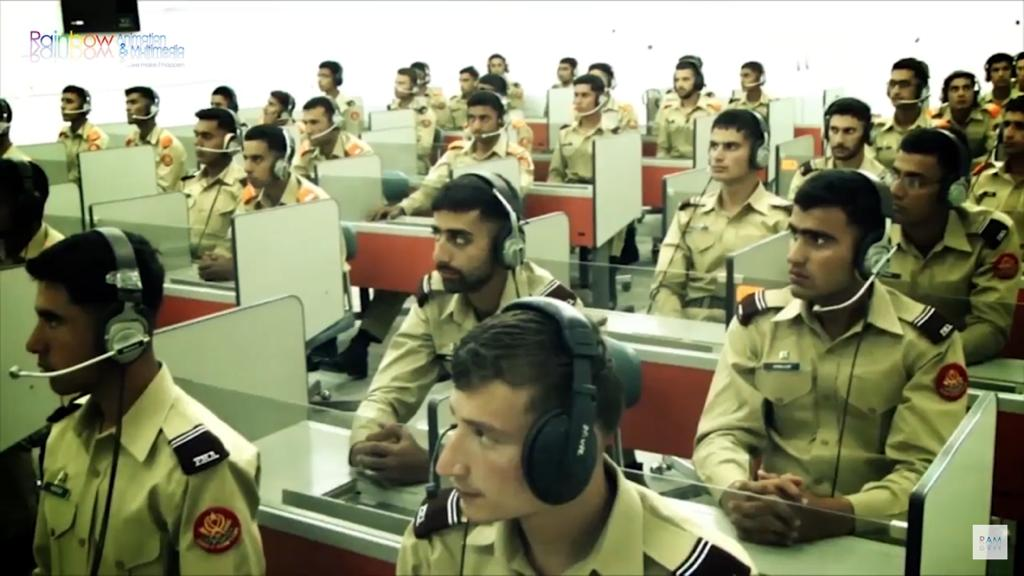
Gentlemen Cadets of the Pakistan Military Academy during a language lab

In the Pakistan Army, potential servicemen training to be officers at the Pakistan Military Academy (PMA) are known as Gentlemen Cadets. Gentlemen Cadets join PMA Kakul either as a direct entry from civilian colleges or from Military Cadet colleges after going through an InterServices Selection Board.

GCs undergo a two-year military training program at PMA Kakul, equally divided into four semesters. The Academic Degree program for Gentlemen Cadets at PMA is a 4-year BS Engineering Sciences which compromises of 8 semesters, four of which they complete at PMA and the remaining four they study as second lieutenants at Human Resource Development Centres after the Grant of Commission from PMA.

== Philippines ==
In the Armed Forces of the Philippines, officer aspirants mainly train at the Philippine Military Academy. The cadets at PMA go through a 4 year program that grants them a Bachelor of Science in Management major in Security Studies.They are divided into four classes, the lower the class, the higher their superiority. Starting from lowest to highest:

- Fourth class Cadets (Plebe) - 1st year
- Third class Cadets (Yearlings) - 2nd year
- Second class Cadets (Cows) - 3rd year
- First class Cadets (Firsties) - 4th year

The AFP also offers OCS to all their service brances: Army, Navy, Navy (Marines), Air Force. Instead of a 4 year course, they only do 1 year of leadership and management graduate course.

== Singapore ==
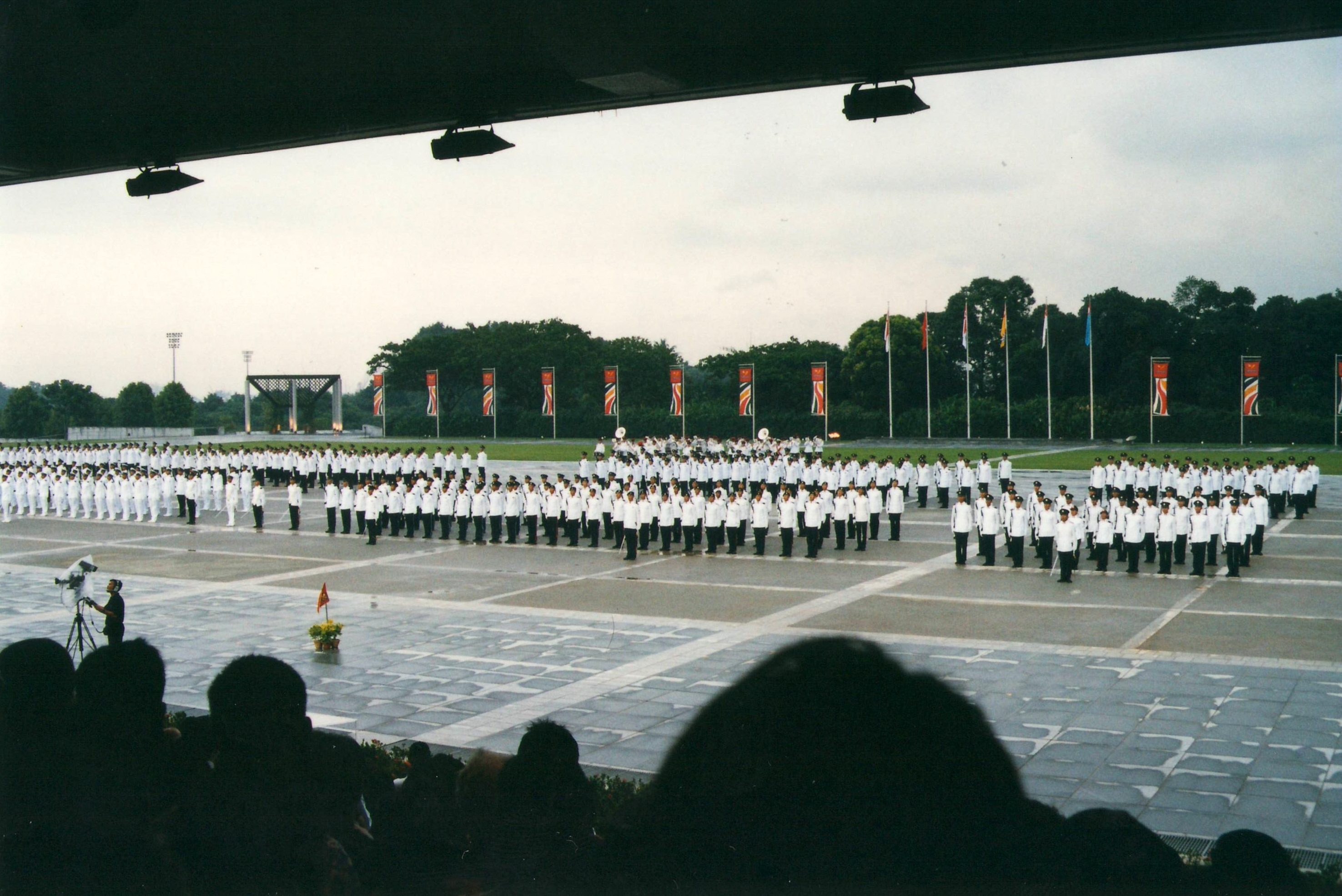
Singaporean officer cadets during their commissioning parade

In the Singapore Armed Forces, potential servicemen training to be officers are known as officer cadets in the Army and Air Force, while those in the Navy are known as midshipmen. All officer cadets and midshipmen receive tri-service initial training in Officer Cadet School before being sent to the appropriate training schools. They return to Officer Cadet School for their commissioning parade.

Officer cadets and midshipmen wear one, two, or three white stripes on their shoulderboards to denote their seniority. The graduating class of officer cadets wear peaked caps and berets depending on their vocations, and are accorded the privilege of being addressed "sir" by junior officer cadets. At this point, they are given more privileges and responsibilities commensurate with their seniority.

Officer cadets take turns to hold various administrative and exercise appointments. Administrative appointment-holders' shoulderboards have additional loops and whorls known as "fishes" in addition to their existing one, two or three stripes. Exercise appointment-holders wear yellow rank insignia appropriate to the appointment of the officer cadet. For example, an exercise platoon commander will wear two bars of a lieutenant, and his exercise platoon sergeant will wear a brassard with first sergeant's chevrons.

== United Kingdom ==
In the United Kingdom, the rank of officer cadet is held by officers in training, at the Royal Military Academy Sandhurst, at Britannia Royal Naval College in Dartmouth, and the Royal Air Force College at RAF Cranwell, as well as students who are part of the Defence Technical Undergraduate Scheme (DTUS) and is also used by personnel of University Royal Naval Units, University Officer Training Corps, and University Air Squadrons. They are referred to and addressed as, for example, "Mr Smith" or "Miss Smith", or more formally as "Officer Cadet Smith". As they do not hold the King's commission, they are not saluted.

=== Royal Navy ===
In Britannia Royal Naval College, Dartmouth, the rank is non-substantive and only used in the initial phases of training, after which officers use their substantive rank of Midshipman. Royal Navy officer cadets wear shoulder flashes with a white square after they complete the Militarisation phase of training (15 weeks). Formerly, the insignia was a navy blue patch on both sides of the coat collar, with a white buttonhole and gold button, similar to a midshipman's patch. They continue to wear these tabs until they pass out of BRNC at the end of their initial training. Students who enlist in the University Royal Naval Unit, a reserve unit under the command of BRNC, also hold this rank.

==== Royal Marines ====
In the Royal Marines, the rank is held by those undergoing the Young Officer Training Course, the 15-month training course which is undertaken in various stages at the Commando Training Centre Royal Marines, Britannia Royal Naval College and in the United States.

=== British Army ===
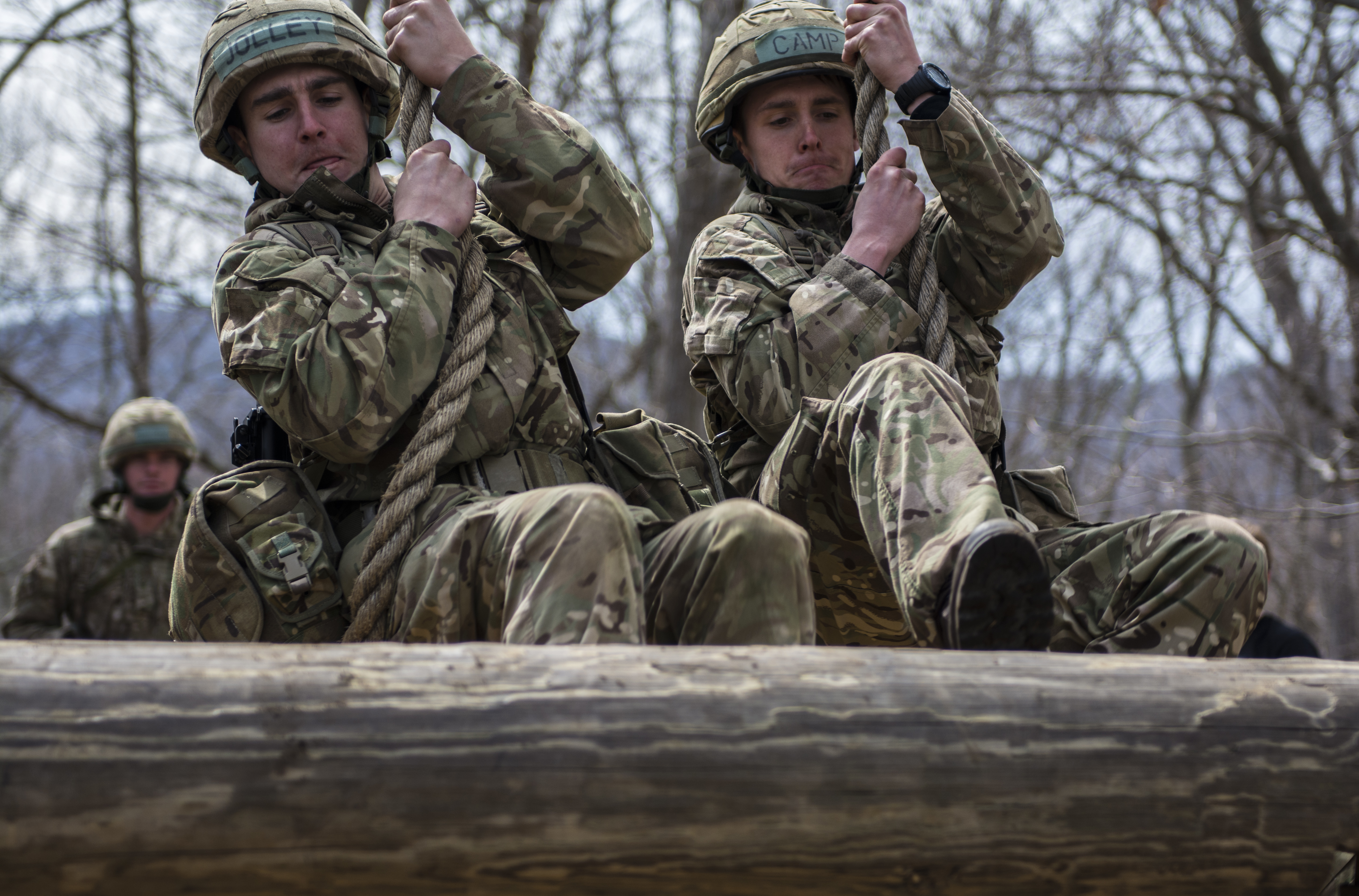
Officer cadets assigned to the Royal Military Academy Sandhurst practice manoeuvring a rope swing

The rank of officer cadet is held by those undergoing initial officer training at the Royal Military Academy Sandhurst (RMAS) or by personnel in the University Officers' Training Corps (UOTC, an Army Reserve unit for students at university).

==== Rank insignia ====
The standard rank insignia for a British Army officer cadet at both the RMAS and the UOTC is a single horizontal bar on the rank slide. Additionally officer cadets in the UOTC may also wear two to three horizontal bars on the rank slide in order to denote the stage of training and experience the officer cadet is at. The RMAS and UOTC can appoint officer cadets to underofficer appointments.

=== Royal Air Force ===
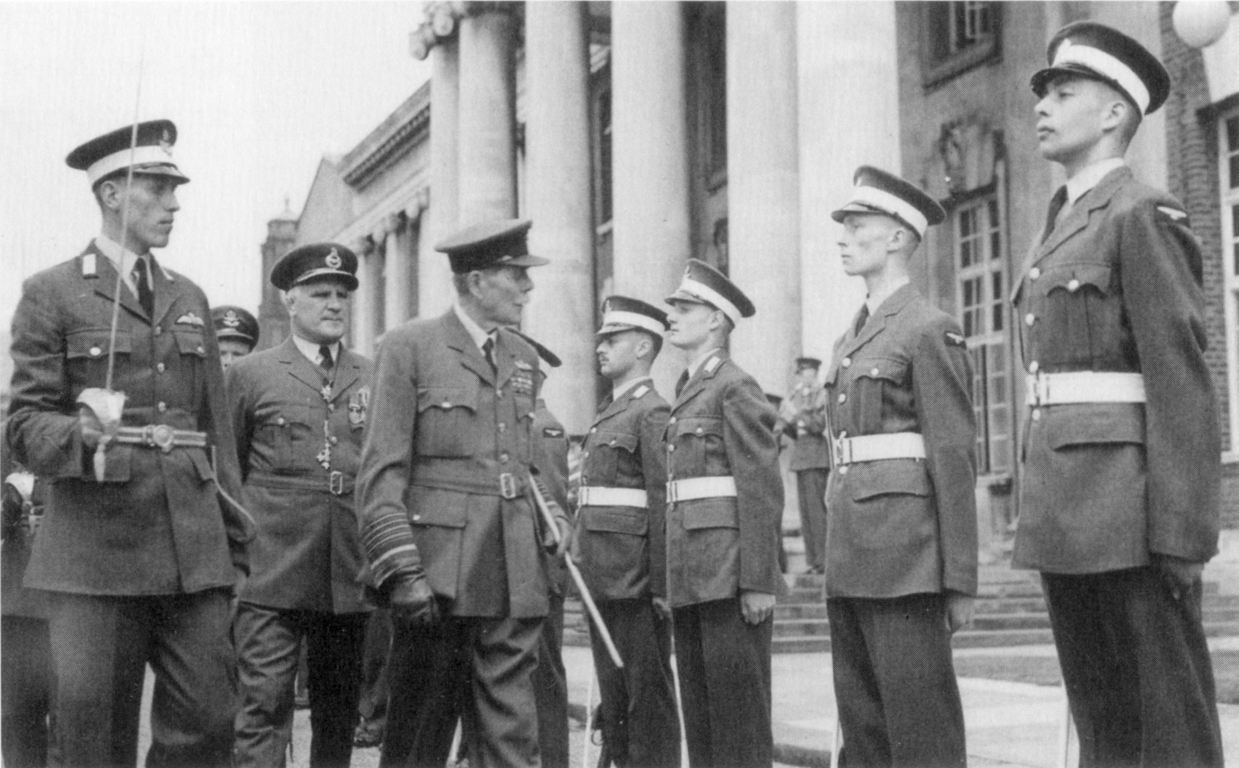
Lord Trenchard inspects officer cadets of the Royal Air Force College, c. 1930s

The rank of officer cadet is held by those undergoing initial officer training at the Royal Air Force College Cranwell. Students undergoing the Foundation Degree course at DCAE Cosford, having been selected for service as engineer officers from the ranks, hold their previous rank while wearing officer cadet rank insignia for the duration, prior to attending initial officer training. The rank is also held by members of University Air Squadrons.

==== Rank insignia ====
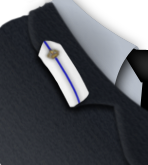
Rank insignia for Royal Air Force officer cadet (service dress)

Royal Air Force officer cadets wear differing rank tabs displaying each term. No red band is on the rank tab during the first 6-week term at RAF College Cranwell, a single red band is adopted in term two. Two red bands are worn in term three. Three red bands are worn in term four.

On the service dress and mess dress uniforms, RAF officer cadets wear the braid of the rank they will hold on graduation. However, gorget patches (rectangular white tabs with one triangular end) are worn on both lapels. The only exception to this is the female mess dress, where they are worn on the sleeve. The only other distinctive identifiers are on headdress – a white patch on the beret behind the badge. The cap badge is the same as that worn by a commissioned officer (between the ranks of pilot officer and group captain), but with a white band around the cap. This band is removed on graduation.

A blue band on the white background is also used to denote officer cadets of the University Air Squadrons (UASs) who are receiving Bursaries from the Royal Air Force. UAS cadets who are not in receipt of scholarships wear just the 1-inch (25 mm) white band with no coloured band. UAS officer cadets wear airmen's headdress with a white band.

== United States ==
The United States Army and Air Force use the rank "cadet" for officer candidates in the Army and Air Force Reserve Officer Training Corps (ROTC) programs at civilian colleges and universities and for cadets at the United States Military Academy (USMA), United States Air Force Academy (USAFA), United States Coast Guard Academy (USCGA), and Air Force Officer Training School (OTS). The United States Navy uses the rank of "midshipman" for officer candidates in the Naval Reserve Officer Training Corps at civilian colleges or universities or United States Naval Academy (USNA) who are pursuing commissions as officers in both the Navy and the Marine Corps, as well as those enrolled in the United States Merchant Marine Academy, the latter at USMMA typically being commissioned as Reserve officers for service in either the active duty Navy or in the Navy Reserve.

High school students who, with few exceptions, are under the age of 18 in the Junior Reserve Officers' Training Corps in U.S. high schools and preparatory schools, the United States Naval Sea Cadet Corps, and the Cadet Program of the Civil Air Patrol are also addressed as cadet, but have no actual military status.

The term "officer candidate" is used for others seeking a commission as an officer. The term "officer candidate" is generally used for officer candidates who are seeking their commission by means other than ROTC or a service academy, such as through Army, Navy, Marine Corps or Coast Guard Officer Candidate School (OCS). This includes civilian college and university students in the Marine Corps' Platoon Leader Class (PLC) program, the Coast Guard's Student Pre-Commissioning Initiative (CSPI) where students attend those services' respective officer candidate schools. It also previously included the Navy's since discontinued Aviation Officer Candidate School (AOCS) for civilian college and university graduates and its Aviation Reserve Officer Candidate Program (AVROC) program for college/university seniors and college graduates, the latter having been embedded in the AOCS program. Another term, "officer trainee", was previously used by the Air Force's OTS program until that term was changed to cadet in 2015.

Officers commissioned in to the Space Force are typically accessed via USAF commissioning programs such as the U.S. Air Force Academy, Air Force ROTC, and Air Force Officer Training School.

The term "cadet" may also be used generally to refer to students at a private military academy, or members of a youth group associated with the military who are receiving preliminary training with the intention of possibly joining the military, sometimes at a younger age than they would be able to do otherwise.

Officer cadets are generally paid below the standard pay rates for junior officers, but receive some of the rights and responsibilities of a junior officer during their training. Academy cadets and midshipmen are considered Geneva Conventions Category III personnel, the same as warrant officers and junior officers/company grade officers below the rank of major in the Army, Air Force, Marine Corps and Space Force and below the rank of lieutenant commander in the Navy and Coast Guard.

=== Reserve Officers' Training Corps ===
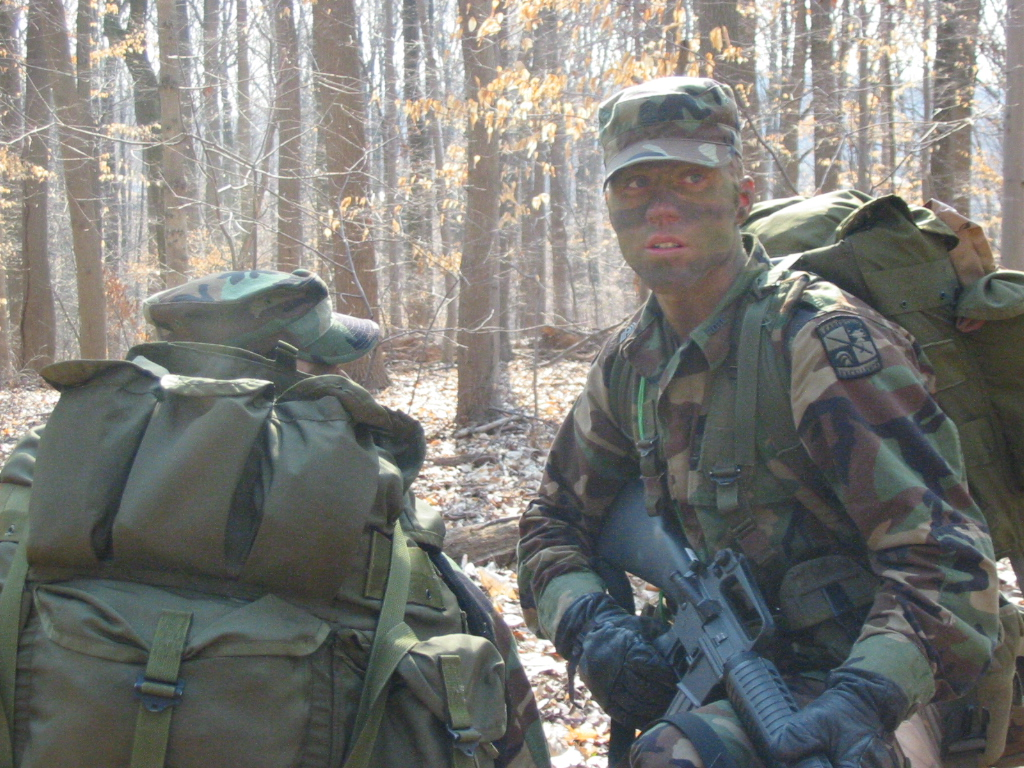
Army ROTC cadets on a field training exercise in March 2005

Cadets and midshipmen in the ROTC programs generally hold training ranks equivalent to their branch's enlisted ranks during their first three years of training and officer-equivalent ranks during their senior year, except in the Air Force where they hold officer-equivalent rank during their junior and senior years. In addition, a small amount of NROTC midshipmen 2/C may hold officer ranks, limited by the amount of available billets. Cadets or midshipmen holding cadet-enlisted rank must salute cadet or midshipman officers within their own branch of the service.

Cadet officer ranks in US Army ROTC are denoted by "pips" – one to three circular insignia denoting the company-grade equivalents, one to three diamond-shaped insignia denoting the field-grade equivalents. For midshipman ranks, both junior and senior officer equivalents wear from one to six 1/4" gold stripes or bars.

US Air Force cadets wear rank shoulder boards or lapel insignia which carry miniature insignia identical to those worn by officer trainees at USAF Officer Training School.

=== Service academies ===
Each U.S. service academy has its own set of insignia, different from their corresponding ROTC program.

==== U.S. Military Academy (West Point) ====
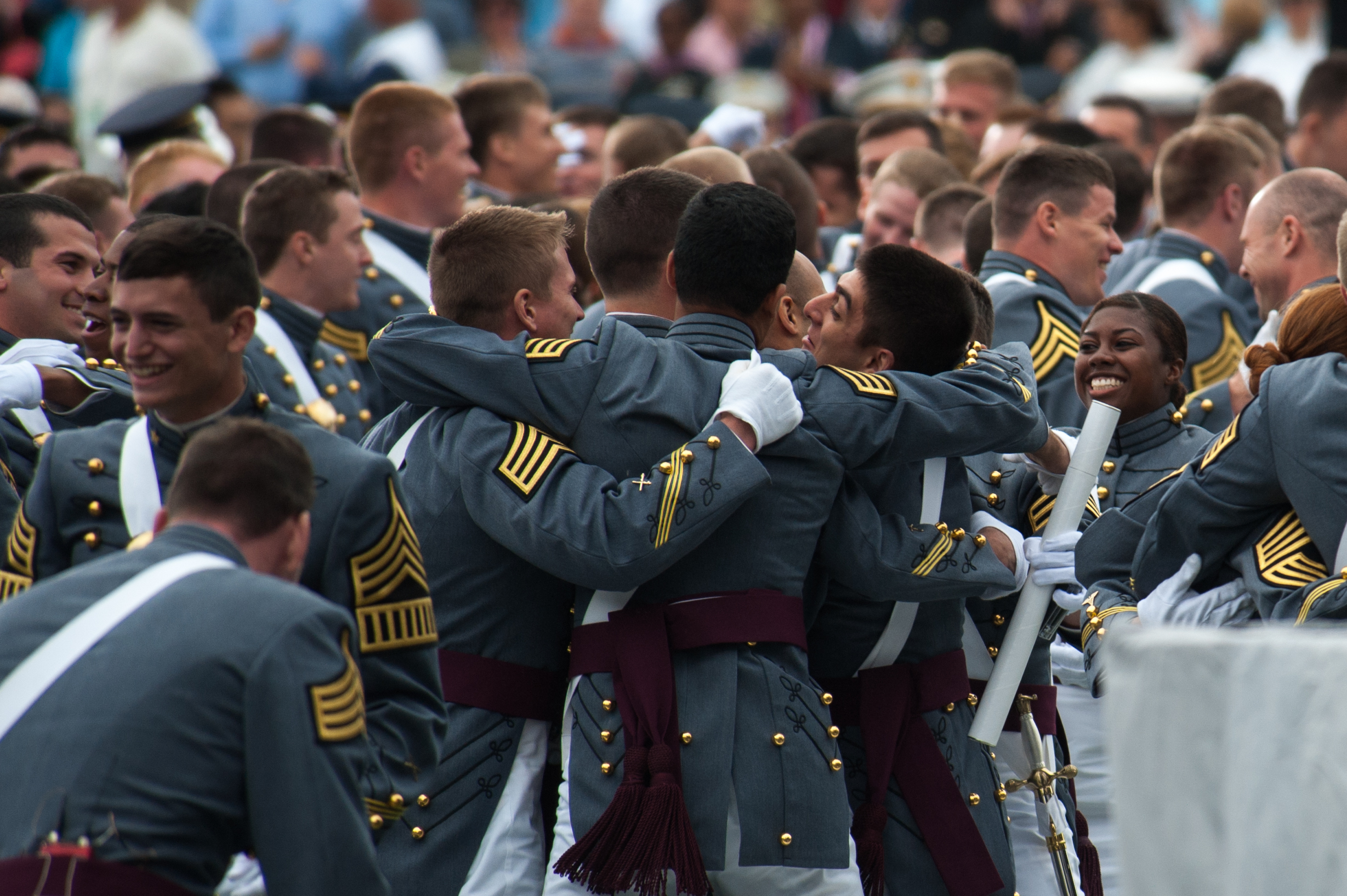
Cadets of the United States Military Academy celebrate at the completion of their graduation and commissioning ceremony

United States Military Academy "class insignia" are worn on the collar and epaulets of certain uniforms. An enameled shield bearing a Greek sword surmounted by the helmet of Pallas, worn on the left collar or above cadet rank stripes/bars on epaulets, is the standard class insignia for third-class (yellow shield), second-class (grey shield), or first-class (black shield) cadets. On traditional "dress grey" and "full dress grey" uniforms and overcoats, the class insignia is indicated by the number of service stripes (one to three) denoting completed years at the academy. These stripes are located on the lower sleeve for the under two classes and on the upper sleeve for the upper two classes. Visitors are sometimes confused to see cadets early in the academic year wearing the insignia of cadet private first class - such cadets are often reduced in rank (for any of a variety of reasons), but have already completed their first year and as such are no longer cadet privates ("plebes").

Rank within the Corps of Cadets is denoted by collar insignia "railroad tracks", a number of black enamel bars with silver outline, or epaulet stripes from one (for cadet corporal) to six (for cadet captain in certain command and staff roles) on certain uniforms. On the traditional dress-grey-based uniforms and overcoats, chevrons denote rank in the Corps. A cadet corporal wears two chevrons on the lower sleeve. A cadet sergeant wears two chevrons on the upper sleeve, a cadet lieutenant three, and a cadet captain from four to six chevrons. For cadets in the rank of cadet sergeant and up, various combinations of stars, diamonds, rockers or arcs, and other devices, are used on the sleeves to denote specific positions/jobs. The title of cadet captain is used for all cadets wearing four or more stripes/bars. The brigade commander, also called the first captain, wears six stripes/bars/sleeve chevrons with a gold star

==== U.S. Air Force Academy ====
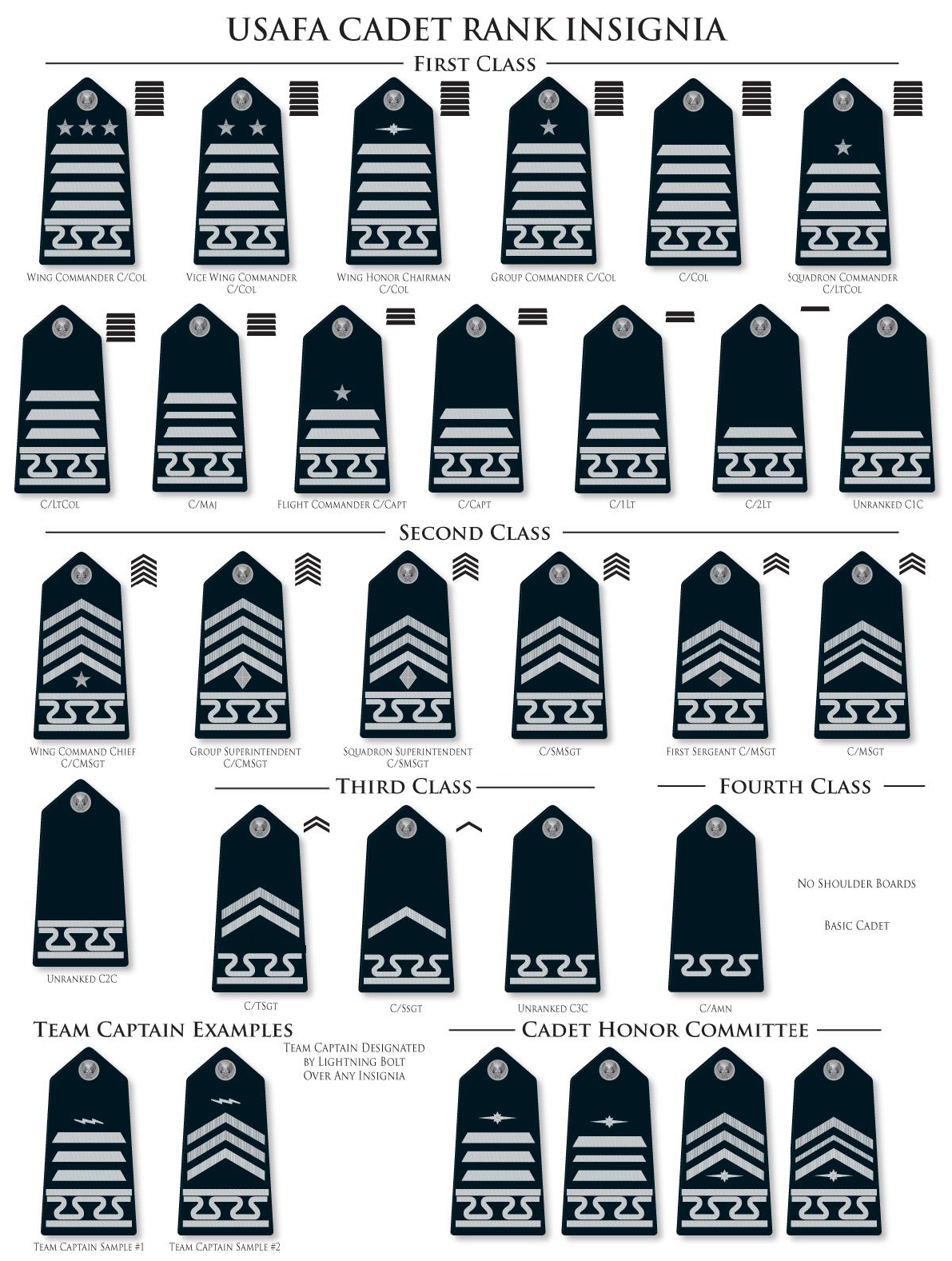
Rank insignias used by United States Air Force Academy cadets

The rank of United States Air Force Academy cadets is denoted by the insignia on their shoulderboards in all "blues" uniforms, including "blues", service dress, overcoats, mess dress and parade dress. All cadet shoulder boards carry the heraldic nebuly device, (commonly referred to as "clouds" by cadets). Third class cadets have one thin bar (ground) underneath the clouds; second and first class cadets wear two thin bars, one each above (horizon) and below the clouds. Additional chevrons denote cadet non-commissioned officer ranks, while additional bars denote cadet officer ranks. An exception to this is the unranked cadets, who are on probation of some kind (academic, athletic, military, honor, etc.). For unranked third class cadets, only ground and cloud are present; for unranked second class cadets only ground, cloud, and horizon are present; for unranked first class cadets only ground, cloud, horizon and one thin bar are present. Vertical diamonds on the boards of second class cadets indicate either squadron or group superintendent positions. Horizontal diamonds on the same indicate squadron first sergeant positions. Stars on first class cadet boards indicate either flight, squadron, or group command positions. If multiple stars are present, the cadet is either the vice wing commander (two stars), or the wing commander (three stars), the senior cadet in the Wing. The only second class cadet rank with a star present is the Wing Command Chief, the senior second class cadet.

On the current Operational Camouflage Pattern, Air Force Academy cadets wear soft spice brown rank insignia on the center of the chest. Formerly, Air Force Academy cadets wore metal blue bars or chevrons on the lapels of the (now retired) Battle Dress Uniform and Airman Battle Uniform to denote their rank. While fourth class cadets wear no insignia on combat uniforms, they are awarded a Prop and Wings after recognition, to be worn on the flight cap and on the lapels of service dress. Third class cadets wear one or two chevrons on each lapel, signifying that they are cadet/staff sergeants or cadet/technical sergeants, respectively. Second class cadets wear three to five chevrons, indicating ranks from cadet/master sergeant to cadet/chief master sergeant. First class cadets function as cadet officers and wear one to six bars on their lapels, corresponding to ranks from cadet/second lieutenant to cadet/colonel.

==== U.S. Naval Academy (Annapolis) and U.S. Merchant Marine Academy (Kings Point) ====
Insignia used by USNA/NROTC Midshipmen

The rank insignia of the United States Naval Academy and the United States Merchant Marine Academy is a combination of sleeve, shoulder and collar insignia, similar to that used by the Naval ROTC units.

==== United States Coast Guard Academy ====
There are two types of insignia used by Coast Guard Academy cadets.

The first is a metal pin-on device. It is a colored shield with a gold anchor with a silver star above it. The color of the background denotes the class. The colors are green for 4/c, red for 3/c, white for 2/c and blue for 1/c. The colors all have historic meanings: red and green represent the running lights on a vessel; white signifies the white lights used as navigation lights, signifying the role as guides for the 4/c; blue represents the blue lights of law enforcement vessels that that 1/c are about to serve aboard.

The second type of insignia is shoulder boards. All cadet shoulder boards have a slightly smaller version of the shield found on officer shoulder boards, and stripes denoting class year or 1/c leadership positions. The 4/c have no stripes, 3/c 1 diagonal stripe, 2/c 2 diagonal stripes, and 1/c 1 horizontal stripe. First class leadership positions have increasing numbers of horizontal stripes, up to six for the Regimental Commander or Summer Battalion Commander, as well as a matching number of sleeve stripes on the Service Dress Blues and Parade Dress Blue uniforms.

== See also ==
- Comparative military ranks
- UK officer ranks
- RAF officer ranks
- Cadet Corps (Russia)
