= Lance Sijan =

United States Air Force Medal of Honor recipient

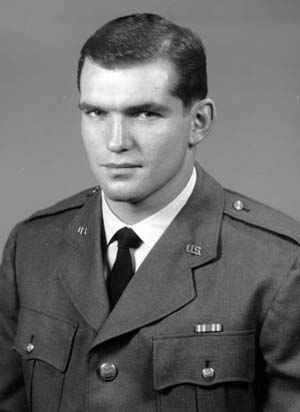
- Lance P. Sijan
- Born: April 13, 1942; Milwaukee, Wisconsin, U.S.
- Died: January 22, 1968 (aged 25); Hoa Lo Prison, Hanoi, North Vietnam
- Burial place: Arlington Park Cemetery; Milwaukee, Wisconsin
- Military career
- Allegiance: United States
- Branch: United States Air Force
- Service years: 1960–1968
- Rank: Captain (posthumous)
- Units: 480th Tactical Fighter Squadron, 366th Fighter Wing
- Conflicts: Vietnam War †
- Awards: Medal of Honor; Distinguished Flying Cross; Purple Heart; Air Medal (6)

Lance Peter Sijan (April 13, 1942 – January 22, 1968) was a United States Air Force officer and fighter pilot. On March 4, 1976, he posthumously received the Medal of Honor, the United States' highest military award, for his selflessness and courage in the face of lethal danger.

== Early life ==
Lance Peter Sijan, also known by his Serbian name Lazar Šijan (Serbian Cyrillic: Лазар Шијан), was born to Sylvester and Jane [Attridge] Sijan on April 13, 1942, in Milwaukee, Wisconsin. His father, who owned a restaurant, was an ethnic Serb, whose parents emigrated from Serbia during World War I, while his mother was an Irish-American. Lance was the eldest of three children. Sijan graduated from Bay View High School in 1960. Immediately after his graduation he attended the Naval Academy Preparatory School at the United States Naval Training Center Bainbridge, Maryland.

== Military career ==
After attending the Naval Academy Preparatory School, he gained an appointment to the United States Air Force Academy at Colorado Springs, Colorado. He played on the academy's football team for three years, but quit the team in his final year to concentrate on his studies. Graduating with a Bachelor of Science degree in Humanities in 1965, he was awarded a second lieutenant's commission and began Undergraduate Pilot Training. After its completion, he was assigned to the 480th Tactical Fighter Squadron, 366th Fighter Wing, stationed at Da Nang Air Base, South Vietnam. He flew as a pilot and systems officer in an F-4 Phantom.

=== Last mission ===
On the night of November 9, 1967, for his 52nd combat mission, Sijan and pilot Lieutenant Colonel John Armstrong were tasked with a bombing mission to Ban Laboy Ford in Laos. As they rolled in on their target to release their ordnance, their F-4C (AF Ser. No. 64-0751) was engulfed in a ball of fire due to the bomb fuses malfunctioning and causing a premature detonation on their release. Sijan managed to eject from the aircraft, and although likely rendered unconscious in the ejection, his parachute landed him on a rocky limestone karst ridge adjacent to the target.

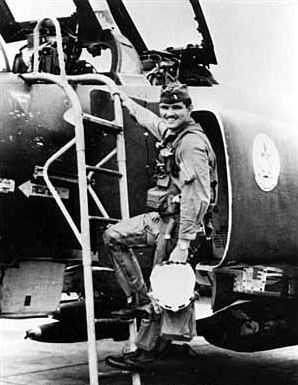
Sijan boarding an F-4 Phantom II

From the night of 9/10 November to the morning of 11 November, no electronic or radio signals were heard from either Sijan or Armstrong. However, early on the morning of 11 November, Sijan made radio contact with a Misty FAC F-100F aircraft that was flying over his crash site. For the duration of that day, the USAF launched a massive effort to locate his position, and 'soften up' the numerous enemy air defences in his area. At dusk, the SAR forces were finally able to position a CH-3 Jolly Green Giant helicopter near Sijan's position. During this overall rescue operation, over 20 aircraft were damaged by anti-aircraft fire, and many had to return to base. One A-1H aircraft was shot down, though its pilot was soon rescued by a SAR helicopter on station. Sijan, refusing to put other airmen in danger, insisted on trying to crawl to a jungle penetrator lowered by the helicopter, and he opposed the helicopter's Para-Jumper (PJ) coming down to find and rescue him. The helicopter crew could not see him in the heavy jungle, and as a result did not deploy the PJ to find and rescue Sijan. After the Jolly Green hovered for 33 minutes, and upon hearing no further radio transmissions from Sijan, the on-scene SAR commander (flying in an A-1H aircraft) suspected a trap, and thus ordered the Jolly Green and the entire SAR armada to withdraw. Search efforts continued the very next morning, but they were called off when no further radio contact was made with Sijan. He was then listed in a MIA casualty status.

During his violent ejection and very rough parachute landing on the karst ridge, Sijan had suffered a fractured skull, a mangled right hand, and a compound fracture of the left leg. He was without food, with very little water, and no survival kit; nevertheless, he evaded enemy forces for 46 days. During this entire period, Sijan was only able to move by sliding on his buttocks and back along the rocky limestone ridge and later along the jungle floor. After managing to move several thousand feet, Sijan crawled onto a truck road along the Ho Chi Minh Trail, where he was finally captured by the North Vietnamese on Christmas Day, 1967. Very emaciated and in poor health, Sijan was imprisoned in a People's Army of Vietnam camp. Soon thereafter, he managed to incapacitate a guard and escape into the jungle, but was recaptured several hours later.

Sijan was transported to a holding compound in Vinh, North Vietnam, where he was placed in the care of two other recently captured USAF POWs, Major Robert R. Craner and Captain Guy Gruters. Although in terrific pain from his severe wounds and brutal beatings and torture from his captors, Sijan had not disclosed any information other than what the Geneva Convention guidelines allowed (name, date of birth, service, rank, and service number). Suffering terribly from exhaustion, malnutrition, and disease, he was soon transported to Hanoi, under the attentive care of both Craner and Gruters. However, in his weakened state, he contracted pneumonia and died in Hỏa Lò Prison (better known as the "Hanoi Hilton") on January 22, 1968.

=== Legacy ===
Sijan was promoted posthumously to captain on June 13, 1968. His remains were repatriated on March 13, 1974, and were positively identified on April 22, 1974. He was buried with military honors in Arlington Park Cemetery in Milwaukee. His former cellmate, Craner, recommended him for the Medal of Honor, with supporting testimony provided by his other fellow cellmate, Gruters. Sijan received the Medal of Honor posthumously in 1976, with his parents (Sylvester and Jane Sijan) receiving it on his behalf on March 4, 1976, from President Gerald R. Ford.

In 1984, retired United States Army Special Forces officer Bo Gritz obtained the Air Force Academy class ring of Captain Sijan. Gritz got the ring from a Lao intermediary and attempted to convince the Sijan family to hold a Las Vegas press conference to publicize the ring's return. Implicit in this manipulation of a family's emotions was Gritz's indirect plea for money from the Sijans to cover the "expenses" he had accrued in obtaining their son's ring. After months of negotiations, long-distance communications and help from President Reagan’s administration, the ring was returned to the family in private.

== Military awards ==
Sijan's military decorations and awards include:

USAF Pilot Badge
Medal of Honor	Distinguished Flying Cross	Purple Heart w/ 1 bronze oak leaf cluster
Air Medal w/ 1 silver oak leaf cluster	Air Force Presidential Unit Citation	Air Force Outstanding Unit Award w/ "V" device and 2 bronze oak leaf clusters
Prisoner of War Medal	National Defense Service Medal	Vietnam Service Medal w/ 1 bronze campaign star
Air Force Longevity Service Award	Republic of Vietnam Gallantry Cross Unit Citation	Vietnam Campaign Medal

=== Medal of Honor citation ===
The President of the United States in the name of The Congress takes pride in presenting the MEDAL OF HONOR to SIJAN, LANCE P. Rank and organization: Captain, U.S. Air Force, 4th Allied POW Wing, Pilot of an F-4C aircraft. Place and Date: North Vietnam, 9 November 1967. Entered service at: Milwaukee, Wis. Born: 13 April 1942, Milwaukee, Wis.

Citation:

While on a flight over North Vietnam, Capt. Sijan ejected from his disabled aircraft and successfully evaded capture for more than 6 weeks. During this time, he was seriously injured and suffered from shock and extreme weight loss due to lack of food. After being captured by North Vietnamese soldiers, Capt. Sijan was taken to a holding point for subsequent transfer to a prisoner of war camp. In his emaciated and crippled condition, he overpowered 1 of his guards and crawled into the jungle, only to be recaptured after several hours. He was then transferred to another prison camp where he was kept in solitary confinement and interrogated at length. During interrogation, he was severely tortured; however, he did not divulge any information to his captors. Capt. Sijan lapsed into delirium and was placed in the care of another prisoner. During his intermittent periods of consciousness until his death, he never complained of his physical condition and, on several occasions, spoke of future escape attempts. Capt. Sijan's extraordinary heroism and intrepidity above and beyond the call of duty at the cost of his life are in keeping with the highest traditions of the U.S. Air Force and reflect great credit upon himself and the U.S. Armed Forces.
/S/GERALD R. FORD

== Other honors ==
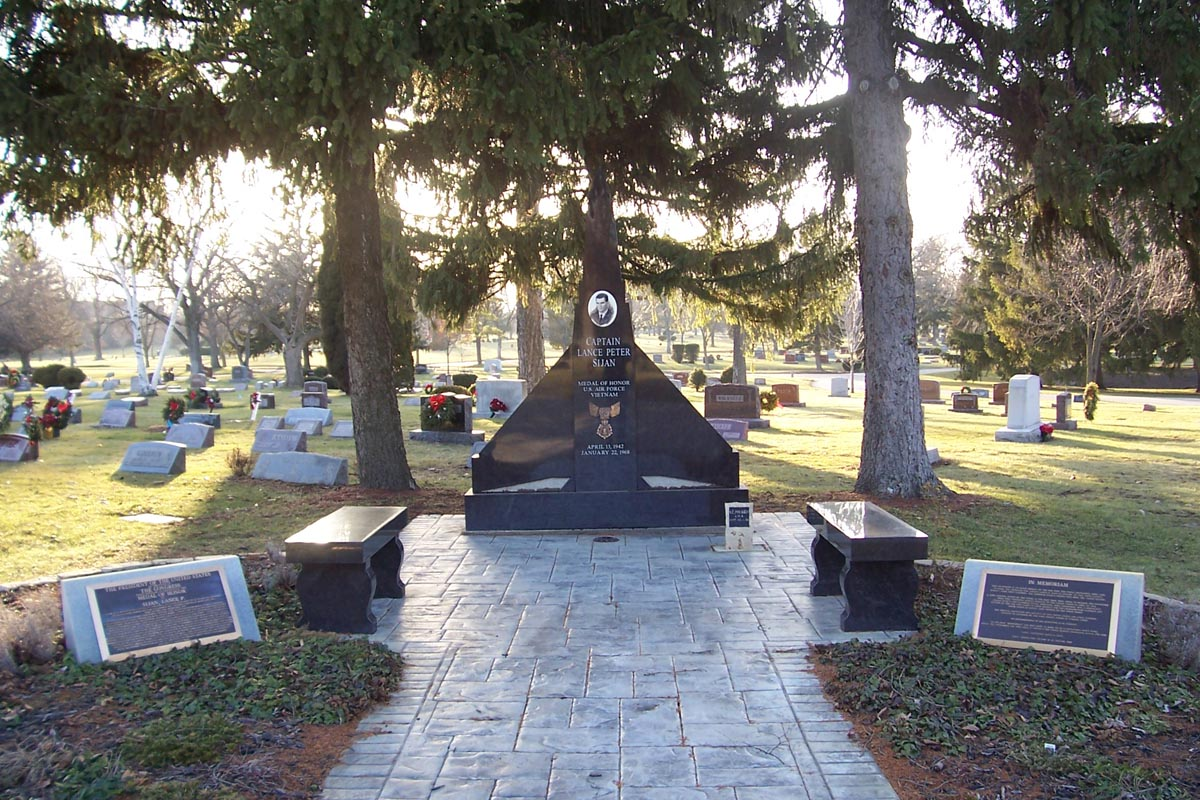
The Lance Sijan Memorial Site at Arlington Park Cemetery

Sijan's heroism and courage brought him numerous honors. The United States Air Force created the Lance P. Sijan Award, recognizing individuals who have demonstrated the highest qualities of leadership in their jobs and in their lives. It has become one of the U.S. Air Force's most prestigious awards.

Because Sijan was the first graduate of the United States Air Force Academy to receive the Medal of Honor, a cadet dormitory, Sijan Hall, was named after him. The dormitory was dedicated on Memorial Day, 1976.

Sijan's high school in Milwaukee set up a scholarship in his honor, presented each year to the student who best exemplifies Lance Sijan's examples of leadership and courage. A nearby park, Sijan Playfield, is dedicated to him, and Milwaukee's Serbian community honors him with a memorial on the grounds of St. Sava Serbian Orthodox Cathedral.

An F-4 Phantom jet fighter on display in front of the 440th Tactical Airlift Wing at Milwaukee's Mitchell Airport is painted using the color scheme of the one he flew.

Sijan was named as the class exemplar at the United States Air Force Academy for the Class of 2002.

In June 2006, before the 440th Airlift Wing was relocated to Pope AFB in North Carolina, there were calls to move the F-4 Phantom jet fighter display from Mitchell International Airport to the Vietnam Veterans Memorial on the Lake Michigan lake front. However, the display was finally moved on February 28, 2017, to another more visible location at Mitchell International Airport. It was re-dedicated at this location on May 26, 2017.

Sijan is a member of the DeMolay International Hall of Fame.

Mountain Home AFB in Idaho named Sijan St. in his honor. A major road at Elmendorf Air Force Base, Anchorage, Alaska, is also named for him.

== See also ==
- List of Medal of Honor recipients for the Vietnam War
- Lance P. Sijan Award
- Into the Mouth of the Cat
