= Air and Space Recognition Ribbon =

US military award

- Air Force Recognition Ribbon
- Type: Ribbon
- Presented by: the Department of the Air Force
- Eligibility: receive "non-portable" awards for accomplishment and excellence while serving on active duty
- Status: Current
- First award: 1980

Precedence
- Next (higher): Outstanding Airman of the Year Ribbon
- Next (lower): American Defense Service Medal

The Air and Space Recognition Ribbon (ASRR) is a military award of the United States Air Force and United States Space Force which was first created in October 1980 as the Air Force Recognition Ribbon. The ribbon is intended to recognize those who have received "non-portable" awards for accomplishment and excellence while serving on active duty in the United States Air Force or United States Space Force. On 16 November 2020, the Air Force Recognition Ribbon was renamed to the Air and Space Recognition Ribbon by the Secretary of the Air Force.

To receive the Air and Space Recognition Ribbon, a service member must receive a designated trophy, plaque, or other award (such as the Sijan Leadership Award) through an achievement as specified by Air Force regulations. The ribbon is thus intended to recognize awards which cannot otherwise be displayed on a military uniform; as such, this award is typically presented in combination with an Air Force or Space Force level annual award.

Additional awards of the Air and Space Recognition Ribbon are denoted by oak leaf clusters.
