= Lance P. Sijan Award =

US Air Force award for leadership

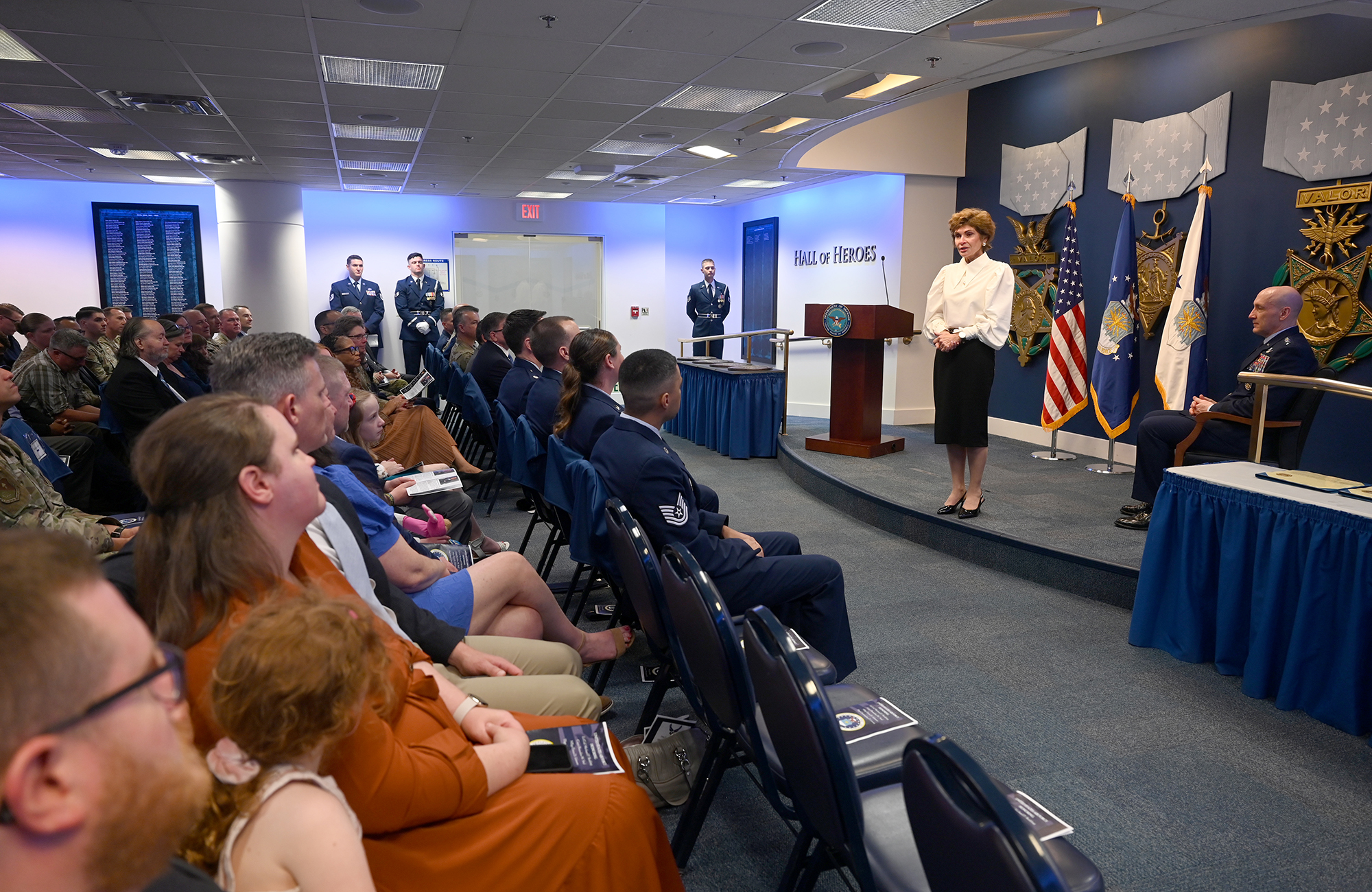
Lance P. Sijan's sister, Ms. Janine Sijan, takes part in the annual Lance P. Sijan Award for Leadership ceremony in the Hall of Heroes at the Pentagon in Arlington, Va., April 30, 2025.

The Lance P. Sijan USAF Leadership Award was created in 1981 to recognize individuals who have demonstrated the highest qualities of leadership in their jobs and in their lives. It has become one of the U.S. Air Force's most prestigious awards. Sijan, an Air Force captain and fighter pilot, died while a POW in Vietnam. Prior to his capture, the United States Air Force Academy graduate and posthumous Medal of Honor recipient evaded the North Vietnamese for six weeks after being shot down in November 1967.

Recipients of the Sijan Award are entitled to wear the Air Force Recognition Ribbon.

The award requirements and process is described in Air Force Instruction 36–2805, Special Trophies and Awards.
