= Franz Grüter =

Swiss politician (born 1963)

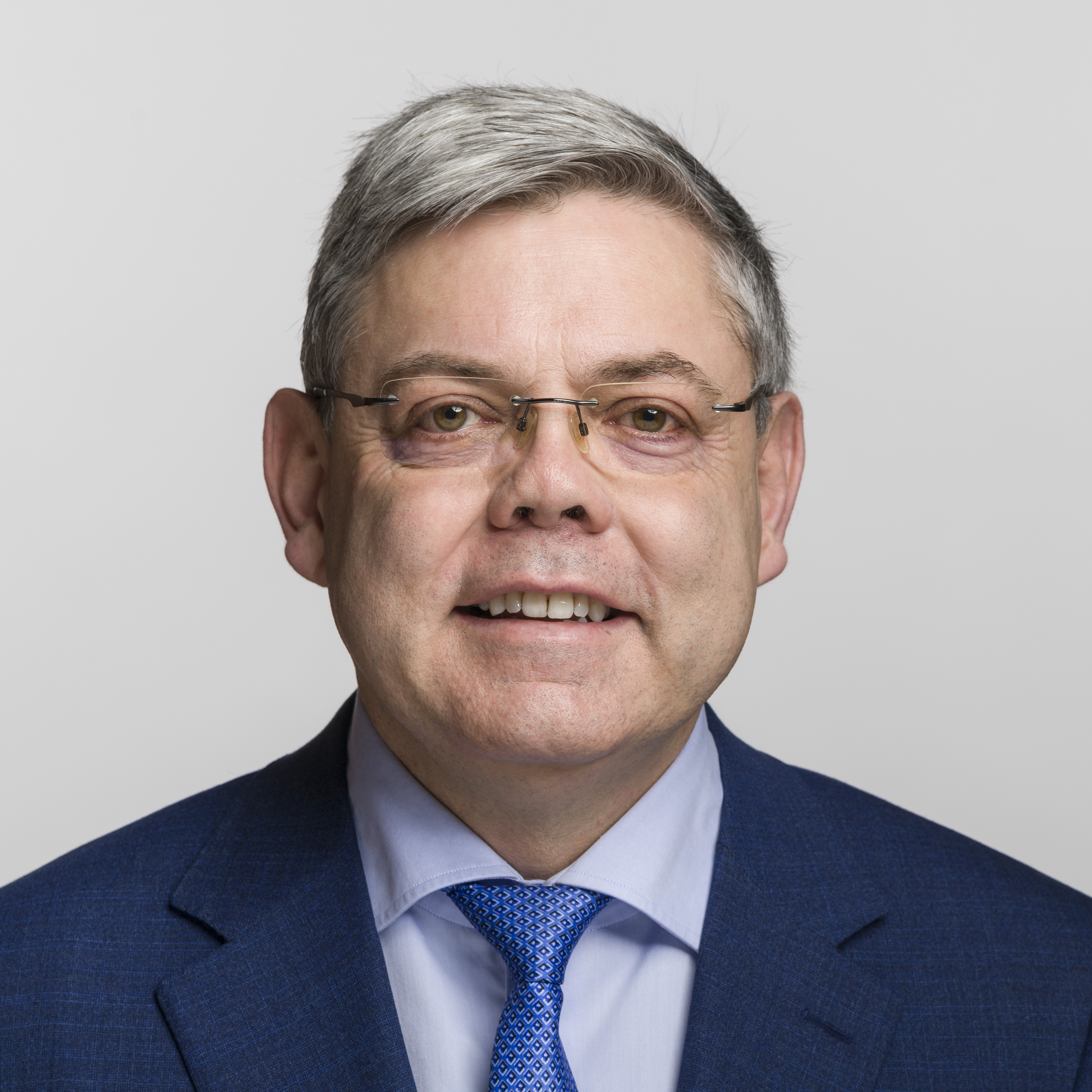
- Franz Grüter (2019)

Member of the National Council
- Incumbent
- Assumed office 30 November 2015

Personal details
- Born: Franz Josef Grüter; 29 July 1963 (age 62) Lucerne, Lucerne, Switzerland
- Party: Swiss People's Party
- Spouse: Luzia Bucher
- Children: 3
- Profession: Businessman, politician
- Website: franz-grueter.ch (in German)

Military service
- Allegiance: Switzerland
- Branch/service: Swiss Armed Forces
- Rank: Captain

Franz Josef Grüter (/ɡruːtɛr/ born 29 July 1963) is a Swiss businessman and politician. He currently serves as a member of the National Council (Switzerland) for the Swiss People's Party since 30 November 2015. Grüter is also known for founding green.ch group which he ultimately sold to the Altice concern for 214 million Swiss Francs (approximately $230m in 2023). Grüter belongs among the richest politicians in the Swiss legislative according to Handelszeitung.

== Early life and education ==
Grüter was born on 29 July 1963 in Lucerne, Switzerland. He was raised in Ruswil, a small village in the Sursee District of Lucerne. He had a modest upbringing and attended local schools. His parents were members of the Christian Democratic People's Party. Grüter attended high school in Willisau, where he completed his Matura. Ultimately he completed an apprenticeship as a truck mechanic and studied electrical engineering at a University of Applied Sciences. He also completed a professional certification as marketing planner.

== Career ==
In 1990, he participated in BICA AG, a technology start-up, in Rothenburg. He became a managing director of the company. In 1996, he founded SmartComp AG and in 1997 SmartWeb GmbH all companies active in the internet field. He was able to sell those two company to the American technology concern VIA Networks in 2000. He took-over the daily business activities as CEO. In 2003, he briefly engaged in a trading company in China.

In 2005, he re-acquired the two companies from VIA. It was ultimately owned again by 100% by the founders. In 2005, Grüter took-over the leading Swiss internet provider TIC The Internet Company AG. He ultimately founded the green.ch group in a joint-venture with Altice. This company was ultimately sold to them in 2019. Grüter currently serves on the Board of Directors of Luzerner Kantonalbank since 2018.

== Politics ==
Grüter was President of the Swiss People's Party Lucerne from May 2012 to June 2017 and sat on the Lucerne Cantonal Council from March 2015 to November 2015. In the 2015 Swiss federal election, he was elected to the National Council (Switzerland). In the 2019 Swiss federal election, he was elected vice-president of the parliamentary group of the Swiss People's Party and in 2020 he took over the post created for him as chief of staff to the party president.

Grüter has been President of the Foreign Affairs Committee of the National Council since early 2022. He was one of the few Swiss politicians to take a stand for US-President Donald Trump. He has respect for Trump's career and supports many of his ideas. Due to an illness in his family circle, Grüter campaigns for a new legal regulation of organ donations.

== Personal life ==
Grüter is married to Luzia (née Bucher) Grüter. They have three children and reside in Eich on Lake Sempach.
