= United States Air Force Academy Cadet Insignia =

Military rank

The cadet rank at the United States Air Force Academy is determined by two factors: class year and job. First year, or fourth-class, cadets (C4C) have only one rank; but as they progress through the Academy, their roles, responsibilities, and ranks increase, culminating in their senior year, where roles as an Assistant Shop Lead garner the rank of cadet first lieutenant (C/1Lt), while roles such as the Cadet Wing Commander (AFCW/CC), Cadet Vice Wing Commander (AFCW/CV), or Cadet Wing Director of Operations (AFCW/DO) are accorded the highest rank of cadet colonel.

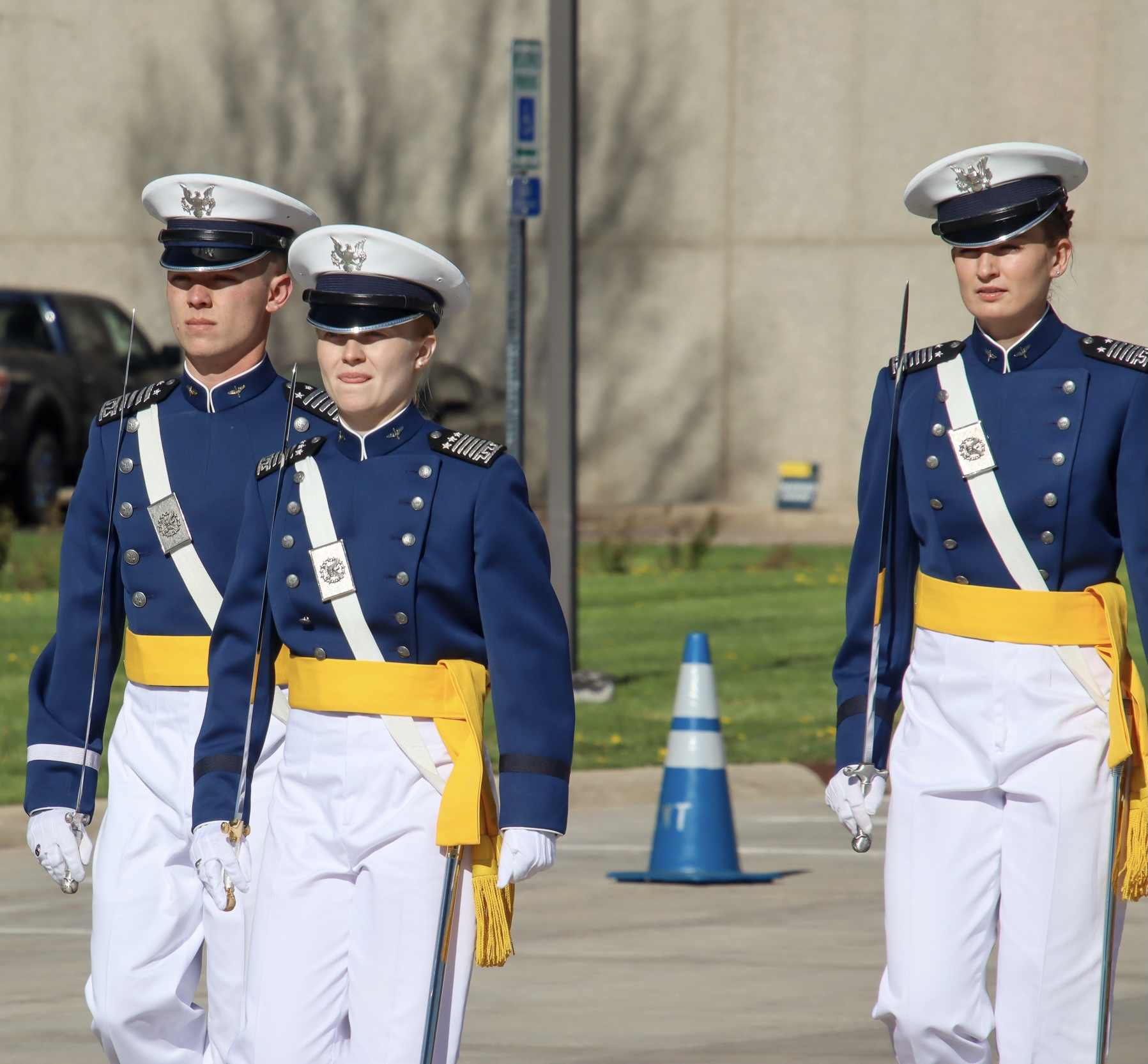
The Wing Tripod which leads the Cadet Wing in parades consists of the Wing Commander (front, middle) flanked by the Vice Wing Commander (left) and the Wing Director of Operations (right).

== Cadet Rank Insignia ==
Cadet Fourth Class - C4C (Freshman)		Cadet Third Class - C3C (Sophomore)
Cadet 4th Class	Cadet Airman	Cadet 3rd Class	Cadet Staff Sergeant
No insignia

Cadet Second Class - C2C (Junior)
Cadet 2nd Class	Cadet Technical Sergeant	Cadet Master Sergeant		Cadet Senior Master Sergeant		Cadet Chief Master Sergeant
Unranked	Group/Squadron Staff	Master Sergeant	Squadron First Sergeant	Senior Master Sergeant	Squadron Superintendent	Group Superintendent	Wing Command Chief

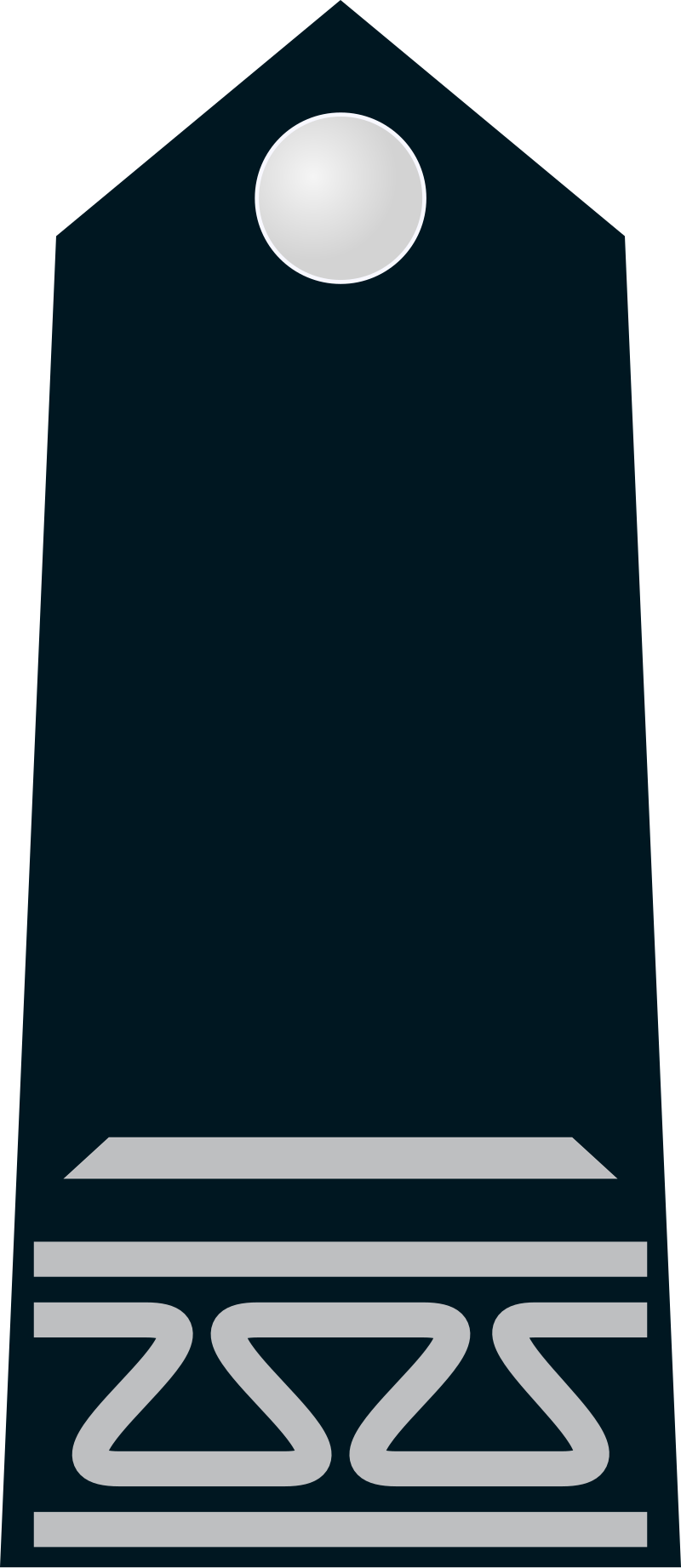
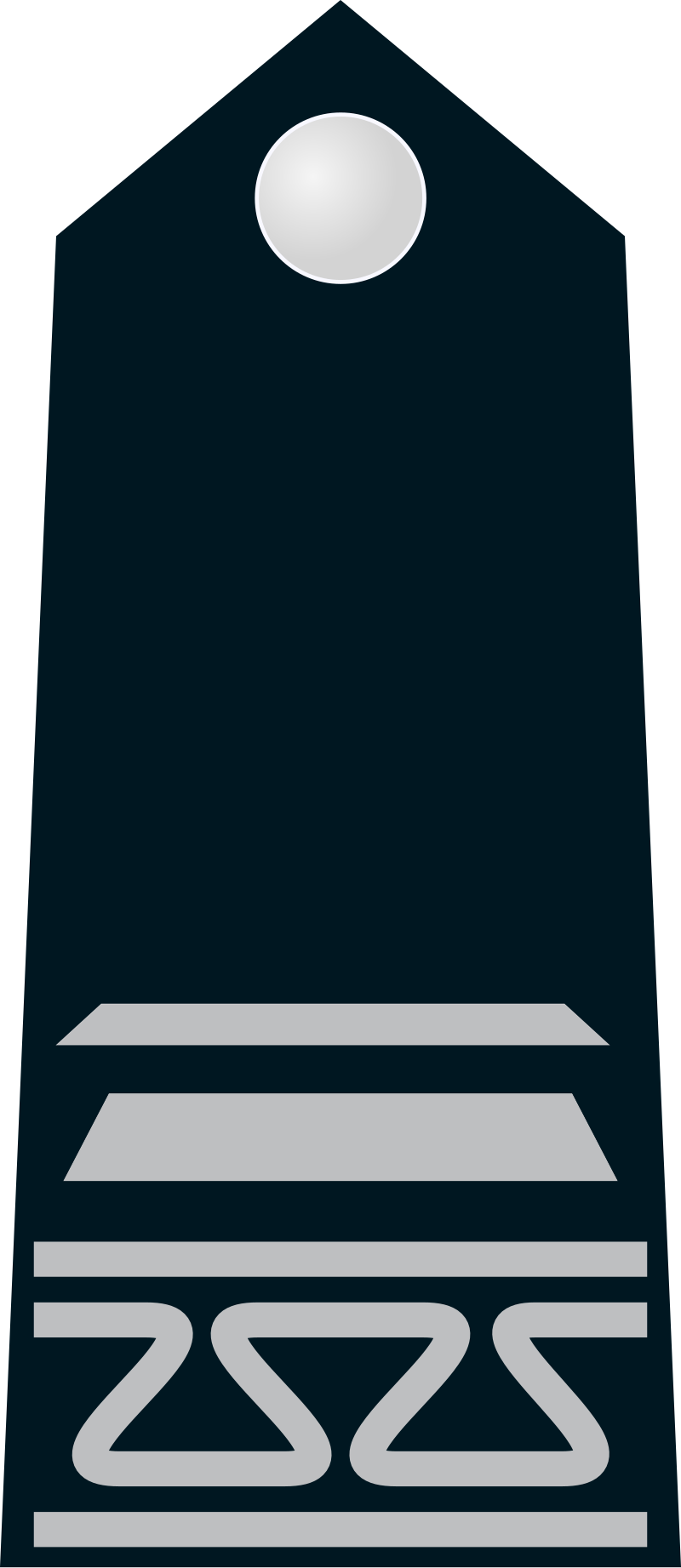
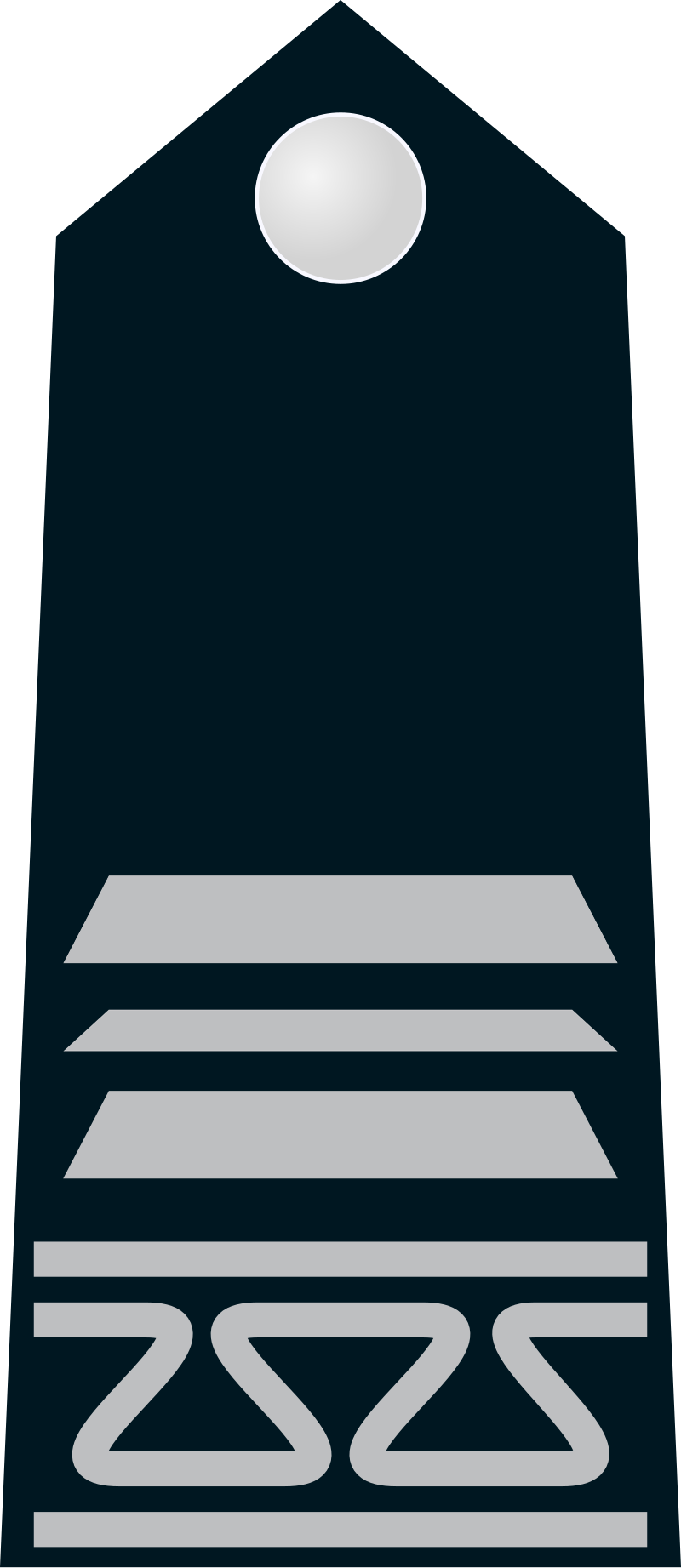
Cadet First Class - C1C (Senior)
Cadet 1st Class	Cadet 2nd Lieutenant	Cadet 1st Lieutenant	Cadet Captain
Unranked		Squadron Staff	Squadron Staff	Flight Commander
Cadet Major	Cadet Lieutenant Colonel
Group Staff	Wing Staff	Squadron Commander
Cadet Colonel
Wing Directors	Group Commander	Vice Wing Commander	Wing Commander

=== Former cadet ranks ===
Cadet Third Class - C3C (Sophomore)
Cadet Staff Sergeant
Chief Clerk

== Cadet Squadron Insignia ==
=== Current Cadet Squadrons ===
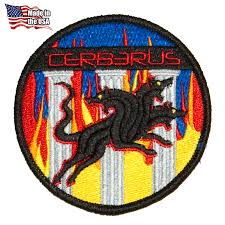
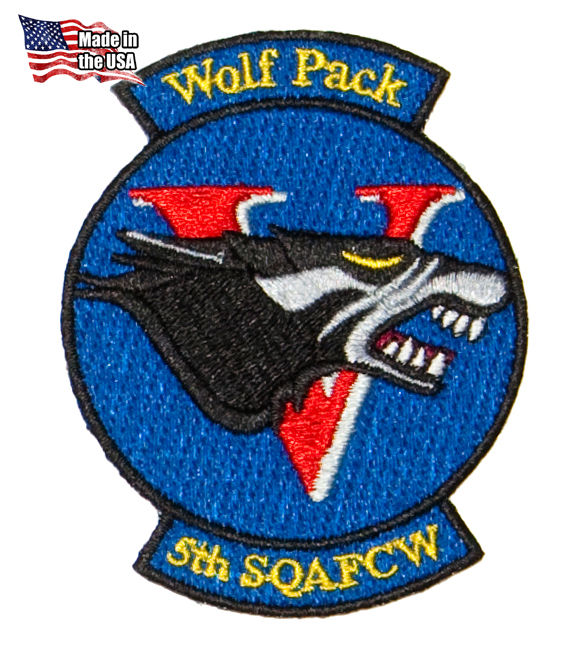
First Cadet Group
Cadet Sq. 1	Cadet Sq. 2	Cadet Sq. 3	Cadet Sq. 4	Cadet Sq. 5	Cadet Sq. 6	Cadet Sq. 7	Cadet Sq. 8	Cadet Sq. 9	Cadet Sq. 10
Mighty Mach One	Deuce	Dogs of War	Fightin' Fourth	Wolfpack	Bull Six	Shadow Seven	Eagle Eight	Viking Nine	Tiger Ten

Second Cadet Group
Cadet Sq. 11	Cadet Sq. 12	Cadet Sq. 13	Cadet Sq. 14	Cadet Sq. 15	Cadet Sq. 16	Cadet Sq. 17	Cadet Sq. 18	Cadet Sq. 19	Cadet Sq. 20
Rebeleven	Dirty Dozen	Bulldawgs	Cobras	War Eagles	Chicken Hawks	Stalag 17	Nightriders	Wolverines	Trolls

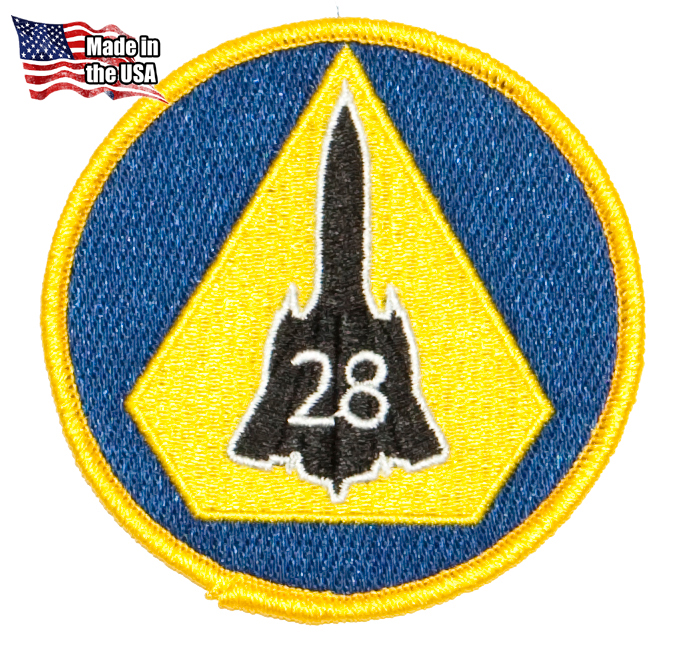
Third Cadet Group
Cadet Sq. 21	Cadet Sq. 22	Cadet Sq. 23	Cadet Sq. 24	Cadet Sq. 25	Cadet Sq. 26	Cadet Sq. 27	Cadet Sq. 28	Cadet Sq. 29	Cadet Sq. 30
Blackjack	Raptors	Barnstormers	Phantoms	Redeye	Barons	Thunderbirds	Blackbirds	Black Panthers	Knights

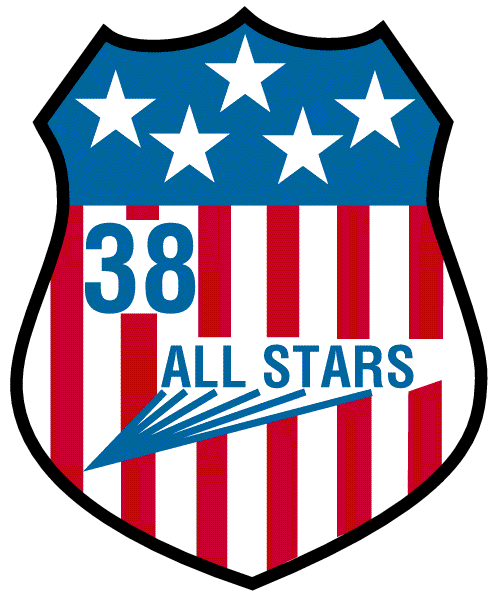
Fourth Cadet Group
Cadet Sq. 31	Cadet Sq. 32	Cadet Sq. 33	Cadet Sq. 34	Cadet Sq. 35	Cadet Sq. 36	Cadet Sq. 37	Cadet Sq. 38	Cadet Sq. 39	Cadet Sq. 40
Grim Reapers	Roadrunners	King Ratz (Cellar Ratz)	Loose Hawgs	Wild Weasels	Pink Panthers	Skyraiders	All-stars	Jedi Knights	Warhawks

=== Defunct Cadet Squadron Insignia ===
Defunct Squadron Insignia
Cadet Sq. 2	Cadet Sq. 3	Cadet Sq. 5	Cadet Sq. 8	Cadet Sq. 9
Deuce	Big 3 (Thirsty Third)	Wolfpack	Evil Eight	Viking Nine	Star Trek

Defunct Squadron Insignia (cont)
Cadet Sq. 14	Cadet Sq. 17	Cadet Sq. 19		Cadet Sq. 20	Cadet Sq. 23	Cadet Sq. 28
Cobras	Stalag 17	Playboy 19	Starship	Trolls	Barnstormers	Blackbirds

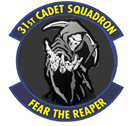
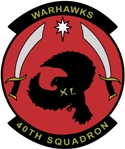
Defunct Squadron Insignia (cont)
Cadet Sq. 31	Cadet Sq. 34	Cadet Sq. 35	Cadet Sq. 37	Cadet Sq. 38	Cadet Sq. 39	Cadet Sq. 40
Grim Reapers	Thunderbolts/Razorbacks (Loose Hawgs)	Wild Weasels	Skyraiders	Bandits	Campus Rads	Ali Baba	Warhawks

== Miscellaneous Insignia ==
=== Merit lists ===
Cadet merit list insignia are worn by those cadets who excel militarily (Commandant's List), academically (Dean's List), or athletically (Athletic Director's List). Cadets who earn a place on all three lists are awarded the insignia for the Superintendent's List.

Cadet Merit List Insignia

Commandant's List

Dean's List

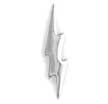
Athletic Director's List

Commandant's & Dean's Lists

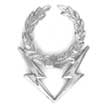
Commandant's & Athletic Director's Lists

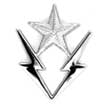
Dean's & Athletic Director's Lists

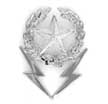
Superintendent's List

=== Aviation ===
Cadet aviation insignia are worn by cadets who achieve certain milestones in their flight training.

Cadet Aviation Insignia

Unmanned Aerial Systems

Soaring/Powered Flight - Solo

Command Soaring Instructor Pilot

Cadet Aviation Instructor

=== Other qualifications ===
While at the Air Force Academy, cadets may earn other insignia including: parachute wings, for completion of either freefall parachute training at the Academy or the U.S. Army's Airborne School at Fort Benning, Georgia; the Air Assault Badge for completion of the U.S. Army's Air Assault program at Fort Campbell, Kentucky; or the Bulldog badge for the completion of the U.S. Marine Corps' "Bulldog" program (Note: A program to commission USAF Academy cadets into the Marine Corps after they graduate.) at Marine Corps Base Quantico in Virginia.

Other Cadet Insignia

Parachute (jump) Wings

Air Assault Badge

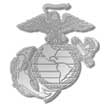
Bulldog Badge

== See also ==
- Cadet Wing Commander (AFCW/CC)
- Cadet Wing Director of Operations (AFCW/DO)
- United States Air Force Academy Cadet Wing
- United States Air Force Academy
