= United States Air Force Academy Cadet Wing =

Student body of the United States Air Force Academy

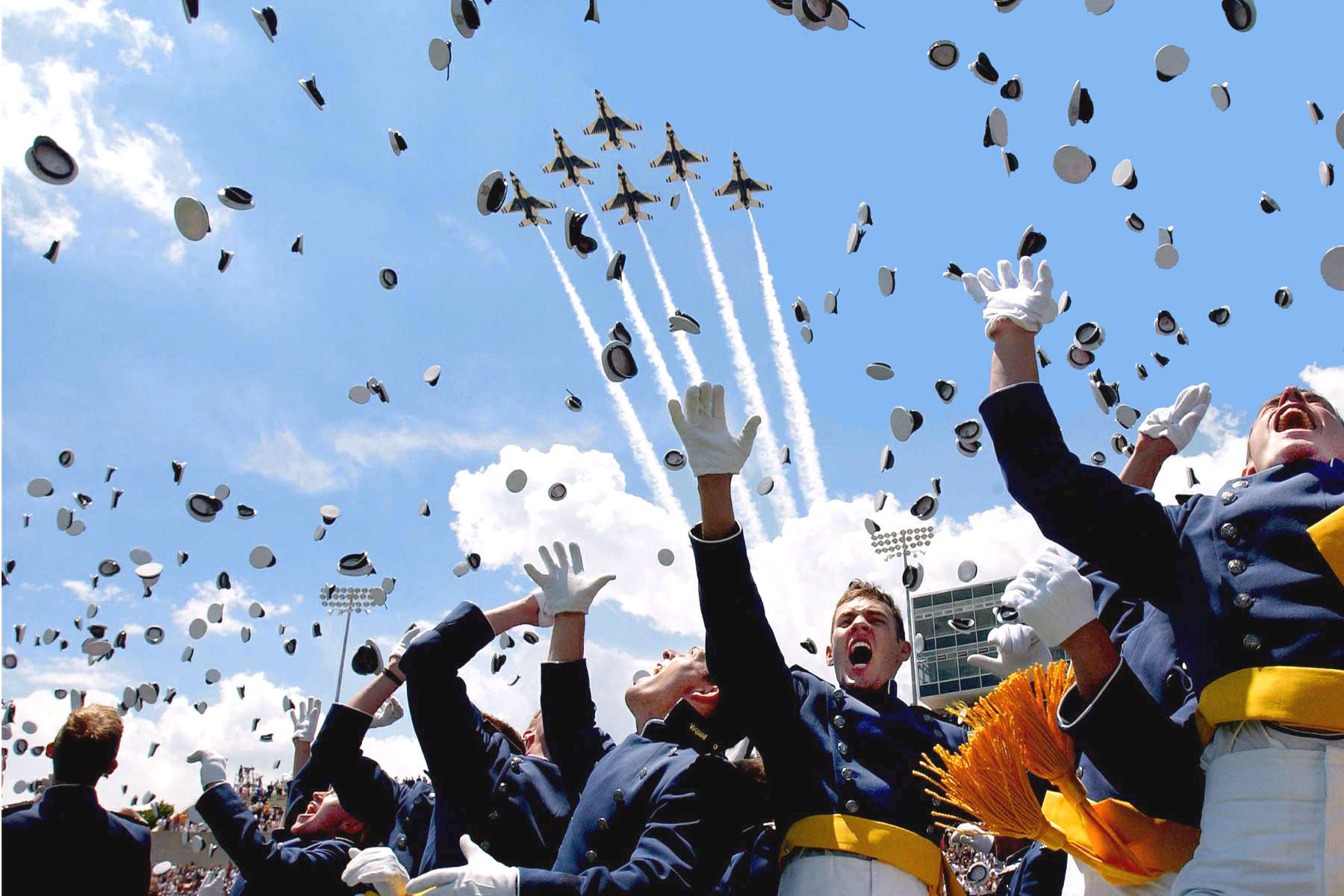
Air Force Academy cadets celebrate after graduation.

The United States Air Force Academy Cadet Wing (AFCW) is the student body of the United States Air Force Academy. The students, called "cadets", are divided into four classes, based on their year in school, much like a civilian college. They are not called freshmen, sophomores, juniors and seniors, however, but fourth-, third-, second- and first-class cadets, respectively. Fourth-class cadets (freshmen) are sometimes called "doolies,” which is a term that derives from the Greek word doulos, which means "slave" or "servant". (Note: Although the official literature from the Academy still uses the word "δοῦλος" extensively, a previously term is "SMACK" — originally a nonspecific derogatory term, but now a backronym for "Soldier Minus Ability Courage and Knowledge" or "Soldier Minus Ability Coordination and Knowledge". Other terms for fourth class cadets include "Squat," "Wad" (an acronym of 'Wise-Assed Doolie'), "Tool", and "Wedge" (the simplest tool).) Members of the three lower classes are also called "4 degrees", "3 degrees" or "2 degrees" (or "4-degs", 3-degs", and "2-degs" respectively) based on their class. (Note: The "degree" terminology comes from a generic ordinal indicator used for classes in the early years of the Academy — for example, "2°" was read as "second class". In recent years, "degree" has been further shortened to "dig", as in "4 digs", "3 digs", etc.) First-class cadets (seniors) are called "firsties". In the military structure of the Cadet Wing, first class cadets hold the positions of cadet officers, second class cadets act as the cadet non-commissioned officers and third-class cadets represent the cadet junior non-commissioned officers.

== Leadership ==
The wing is commanded by the “Wing Top 3”, led by the Cadet Wing Commander (AFCW/CC), the highest ranking first-class cadet, with the Cadet Vice Wing Commander (AFCW/CV) and the Cadet Wing Director of Operations (AFCW/DO).

The Cadet Wing Commander is responsible for the daily operations of the 4,000+ member Wing. The Wing Commander reports directly to the Commandant of Cadets and advises him/her on major command decisions. The Wing Commander supervises the Vice Wing Commander, Cadet Wing Director of Operations, and four Cadet Group Commanders, who in turn each supervise ten Cadet Squadron Commanders. The Wing Commander also commands the wing staff who assist him/her with the creation and implementation of command policy. Among cadets, the Wing Commander is called the “Wing King” or “Wing Queen”.

The Cadet Wing Director of Operations is a senior cadet responsible for the day-to-day operation, readiness, and discipline of the Wing and holds the rank of C/Col, the highest firstie rank. The Wing Director of Operations also oversees the Cadet Wing Operations Center The cadet who fills this position is often called the “Wing D.O.” among cadets. The chief administrator of the cadet discipline system, authorizing and monitoring demerit, tours, and confinement work, he or she also implements military, academic, athletic, standardization/evaluation, and training programs. Lastly, the “Wing D.O.” is in charge of approving the distribution of the daily Routine Order to the Cadet Wing.

== Squadrons ==
When the first class entered the academy in the summer of 1955, they were divided into four squadrons. The number of squadrons then gradually increased at an average of four to eight per year; and by 1970, to its peak of 40 squadrons. The number dipped from 40 to 36 in 1999 but returned to its current strength of 40 squadrons in 2006.

Cadet Groups One, Two, Three and Four consist of Squadrons 1–10, 11–20, 21–30, and 31–40 respectively.

== Class exemplar ==
During the fall semester of the third-class (sophomore) year, the AFCW cadets choose a class exemplar who becomes the class' honorary namesake. The exemplar is typically a deceased former member of the Air Force or Army Air Force, with a few notable exceptions like the Wright Brothers and Neil Armstrong. The tradition began with the Class of 2000. Class of 00-03 selected exemplars during the 99-00 school year with class of 03 receiving theirs after recognition. The selection of the class exemplar is celebrated with a class-wide dinner.

Year	Class Exemplar	Reference
2000	General James H. "Jimmy" Doolittle	
2001	Brigadier General William "Billy" Mitchell	
2002	Captain Lance P. Sijan	
2003	Major Richard I. Bong	
2004	Captain Eddie Rickenbacker	
2005	General George S. Patton Jr.	
2006	General Carl A. "Tooey" Spaatz	
2007	Lieutenant Colonel Virgil I. "Gus" Grissom	
2008	1st. Lt Karl W. Richter	
2009	Colonel Hubert "Hub" Zemke	
2010	1st Lt. Frank Luke Jr.	
2011	Brigadier General Robin Olds	
2012	General of the AF Henry H. "Hap" Arnold	
2013	General Curtis E. LeMay	
2014	Lieutenant Colonel Jay Zeamer Jr.	
2015	Wilbur and Orville Wright	
2016	Major David Brodeur	
2017	Col. George Everett "Bud" Day	
2018	Capt. Louis Zamperini	
2019	Neil Armstrong	
2020	1st Lt. Robert "Bob" Hoover	
2021	Brigadier General James Robinson "Robbie" Risner	
2022	General Daniel "Chappie" James Jr.	
2023	Colonel Leo Thorsness	
2024	Major LeRoy Homer	
2025	Colonel William "Psycho" Andrews	
2026	Master Sergeant John A. Chapman	
2028	Sergeant John L. Levitow	

== See also ==
- United States Air Force Academy
- United States Air Force Academy Cadet Insignia
