= Guy Gruters =

US Air Force officer (born 1942)

Guy D. Gruters
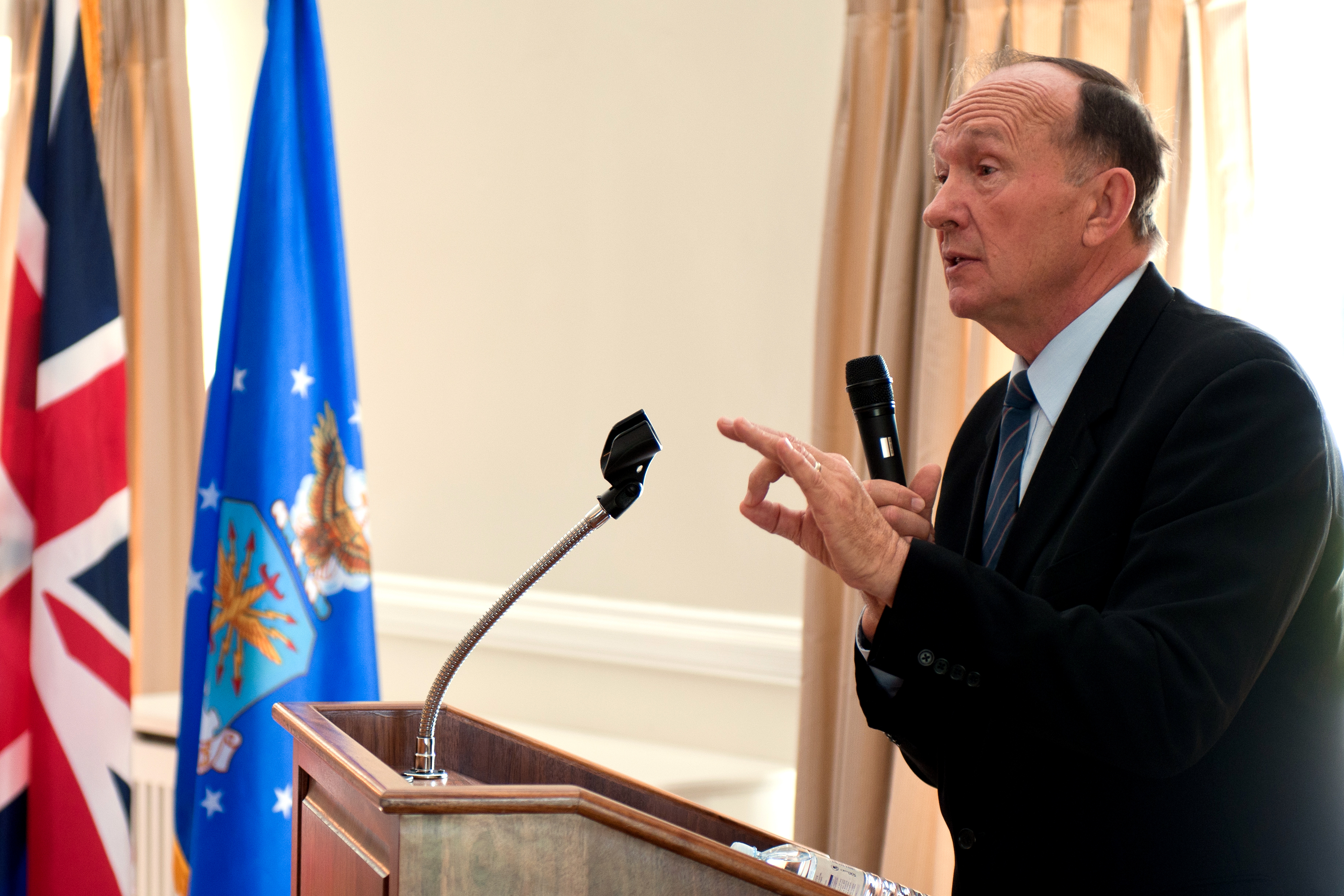
- Gruters in 2012
- Born: Guy Dennis Gruters; October 26, 1942 (age 83); Sarasota, Florida, U.S.
- Allegiance: United States of America
- Branch: United States Air Force
- Service years: 1966–1973
- Rank: Captain
- Conflicts: Vietnam War
- Awards: Distinguished Flying Cross (2); Silver Star (2); Bronze Star (Valor); Purple Heart (2); Air Medal (20); Prisoner of War Medal
- Education: USAFA, B.S. 1964; Purdue University, M.S. 1965

Captain Guy Dennis Gruters (born October 26, 1942) was a United States Air Force officer and fighter pilot best known for his survival for over five years as a prisoner of war in Vietnam. He was one of the five hundred and ninety-one surviving POWs of all military services released in 1973 for return to the United States during Operation Homecoming.

== Early life and education ==
Guy Gruters was born on October 26, 1942, in Sarasota, Florida, but raised in New Jersey, where he spent his childhood trapping muskrat, camping, hunting and Scouting (Eagle Scout rank awarded). He won acceptance to the United States Air Force Academy and graduated with a Bachelor of Science degree in engineering science (summa cum laude; ranked 7th in his graduating class overall, #1 in Engineering Science) in 1964. He then went on to Purdue University and completed a Master of Science degree in astronautical engineering in less than one year, in 1965.

== Air Force service ==
Following his graduation from Purdue, he was sent to flight school. After Undergraduate Pilot Training at Moody AFB, Georgia, he received his pilot wings in March 1966. He completed F-100 Super Sabre Combat Crew Training with the 4514th Combat Crew Training Squadron at Luke AFB, Arizona, in October 1966 and then O-1 Bird Dog Forward Air Controller Training in February 1967. Following this, he volunteered for Vietnam and served six years, more than five years of which was as a POW. During his flight operations as a Forward Air Controller in the first 10 months, Guy flew more than 400 combat missions, first for the 173rd Airborne Brigade in the O-1 Bird Dog light observation aircraft and then for the MISTY Fast FACS in the F-100F Super Sabre over North Vietnam.

As a co-pilot of the two-seat F-100F, Gruters was shot down twice. The first shoot down required a parachute water landing less than 1 mile (1.6 km) offshore near the North Vietnamese city of Đồng Hới while under fire from the North Vietnamese coastal guns in November 1967. While North Vietnamese boats were prevented from intercepting the downed pilots by strafing U.S. F-4 fighter-bombers, First Lieutenant Gruters and Captain Charles Neel were rescued under heavy fire by two USAF HH-3E Jolly Green helicopter crews based 60 miles (97 km) away.

Gruters was shot down for the second time on December 20, 1967. He and fellow pilot, Colonel Robert R. Craner ejected under 1,500 feet (460 m) inverted after losing all hydraulic control. They were captured and imprisoned in the Hỏa Lò Prison (Hanoi Hilton) among other camps for over five years. Upon their initial incarceration, Gruters and Craner cared for Lance Sijan before Sijan succumbed to wounds and torture in January 1968.

Gruters spent 5 years and 3 months as a prisoner of war before his release in 1973.

== Awards and decorations ==
Guy Gruters' decorations include more than thirty combat awards, with two Silver Stars, two DFCs, two Purple Hearts, three Bronze Star Medals for Valor, the POW Medal, a Presidential Unit Citation, over 20 Air Medals and other medals.

USAF Pilot Badge
Parachutist Badge
Silver Star with bronze oak leaf cluster
Legion of Merit	Distinguished Flying Cross with Valor device and bronze oak leaf cluster	Bronze Star Medal with Valor device
Purple Heart with bronze oak leaf cluster	Air Medal with three silver and one bronze oak leaf clusters	Air Medal with two bronze oak leaf clusters (second ribbon required for accoutrement spacing)
Air Force Presidential Unit Citation with bronze oak leaf cluster	Prisoner of War Medal	National Defense Service Medal
Vietnam Service Medal with two silver and two bronze campaign stars	Vietnam Service Medal with bronze campaign star	Air Force Longevity Service Ribbon with bronze oak leaf cluster
USAF Marksmanship Ribbon	Republic of Vietnam Gallantry Cross Unit Citation	Republic of Vietnam Campaign Medal

== Other honors ==
Guy Gruters' testimony was instrumental in Lance Sijan receiving the Medal of Honor posthumously in 1976. Guy Gruters' story was described in the book, "Bury Us Upside Down," "Into the Mouth of the Cat", and "Misty: Fast FACS."
