= Malcolm McConnell =

American author (1939–2020)

Malcolm McConnell (1939 – September 26, 2020) was an American author. He was the author or co-author of twenty-four books, many of them on military subjects. He most recently co-wrote Born to Fly with U.S. Navy pilot Shane Osborn.

== Biography ==
McConnell attended the University of Wisconsin. He enlisted in the U.S. Army as a teenager. Before beginning his writing career, McConnell served as a Foreign Service officer for the United States. He co-authored American Soldier (2004) with General Tommy Franks, a book that reached the top position on The New York Times Best Seller list. He later worked with Paul Bremer III on My Year in Iraq (2006), describing Bremer's role as head of the Coalition Provisional Authority following the Iraq War.

He lived near Queenstown, Marytland, with his wife.
